= Victoria Monét discography =

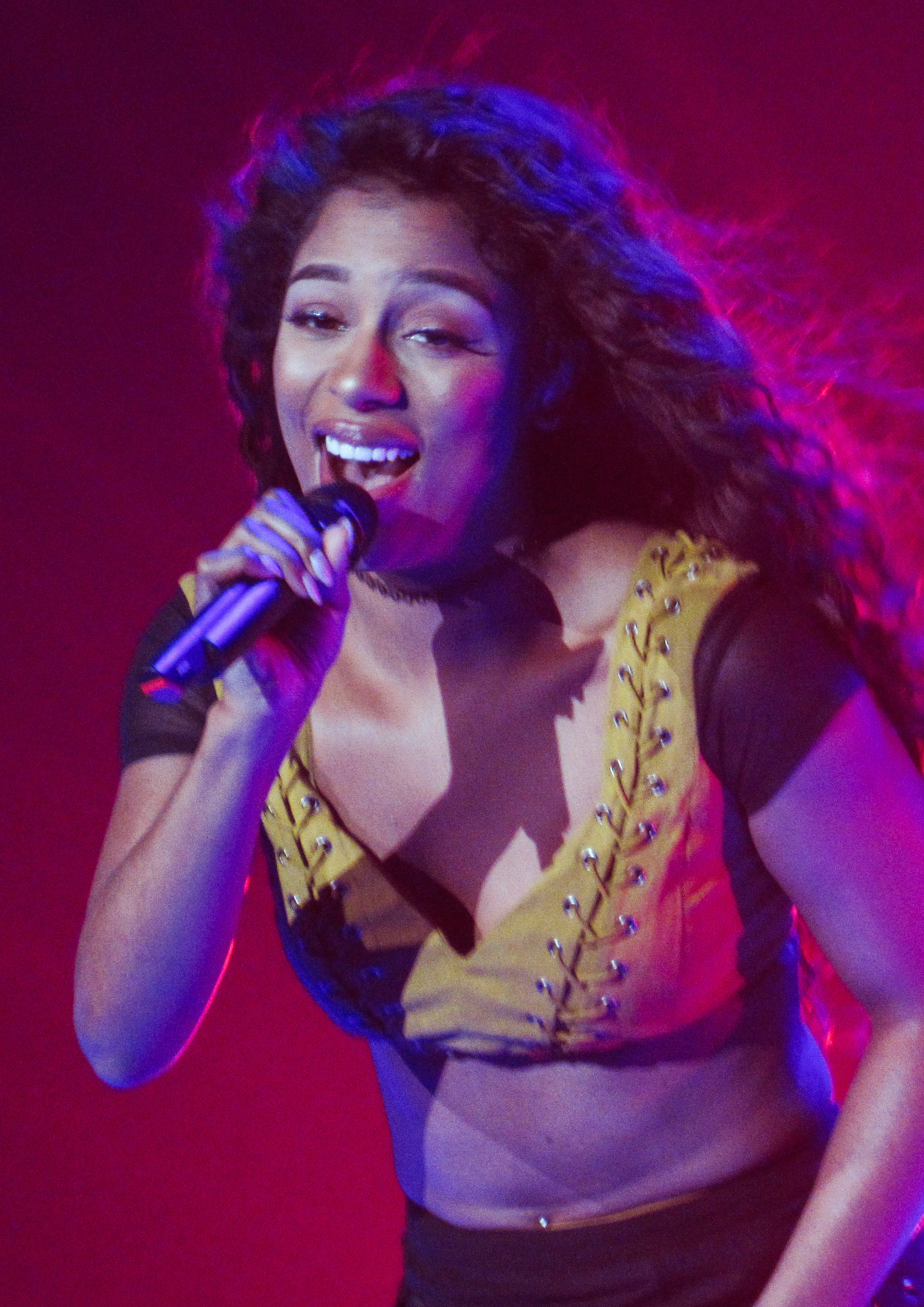
- Monét performing in 2017
- Studio albums: 2
- Remix albums: 1
- Singles: 16
- EPs: 5

American singer Victoria Monét has released two studio albums, one remix album, six extended plays and fifteen singles (including one as a featured artist).

== Albums ==
=== Studio albums ===
List of studio albums, with selected chart positions and certifications
Title	Album details	Peak chart positions					
Title	Album details	US	US R&B/HH	US R&B	UK Sales	UK DL	UK R&B
Jaguar II	Released: August 25, 2023; Label: Lovett Music, RCA; Formats: CD, digital download, streaming, LP	60	22	6	—	57	—
Frequency of Love	Released: October 2, 2026; Label: Lovett Music, RCA; Formats: CD, digital download, streaming, LP	49	13	8	77	34	5

=== Remix albums ===
List of remix albums, with selected chart positions and certifications
Title	Album details
A Jaguar Christmas: The Orchestral Arrangements	Released: December 11, 2020; Label: Tribe Records; Formats: Digital download, streaming
A Jaguar II Christmas: The Orchestral Arrangements	Released: December 11, 2024; Label: Lovett Music, RCA; Formats: Digital download, streaming

== Extended plays ==
List of extended plays, with selected details
Title	EP details	Peak chart positions				
Title	EP details	US	US R&B	US Heat	US Ind.	UK R&B
Nightmares & Lullabies: Act 1	Released: October 30, 2014; Label: Victoria Monét Music; Formats: Digital download	—	—	—	—	—
Nightmares & Lullabies: Act 2	Released: June 16, 2015; Label: Victoria Monét Music; Formats: Digital download	—	—	—	—	—
Life After Love, Pt. 1	Released: February 23, 2018; Label: Victoria Monét Music, Empire; Formats: CD, digital download, streaming	—	—	—	—	—
Life After Love, Pt. 2	Released: September 28, 2018; Label: Victoria Monét Music, Empire; Formats: CD, digital download, streaming	—	—	—	—	—
Jaguar	Released: August 7, 2020; Label: Tribe Records; Formats: CD, LP, cassette, digital download, streaming	174	20	1	26	14
"—" denotes a recording that did not chart or was not released in that territory.

== Singles ==
=== As lead artist ===
List of singles, showing year released, selected chart positions and originating album
Title	Year	Peak chart positions										Certifications	Album
Title	Year	US	US R&B /HH	US R&B	AUS	CAN	IRE	NLD	NZ	SCO	UK	Certifications	Album
"Made in China" (featuring Ty Dolla Sign)	2014	—	—	—	—	—	—	—	—	—	—		Nightmares & Lullabies: Act 1
"90's Babies"	2015	—	—	—	—	—	—	—	—	—	—		Nightmares & Lullabies: Act 2
"See the Light"	2015	—	—	—	—	—	—	—	—	—	—		Nightmares & Lullabies: Act 2
"Ready"	2017	—	—	—	—	—	—	—	—	—	—		Life After Love, Pt. 2
"Freak" (solo or remix featuring Bia) (Note: The solo version of "Freak" appears on Life After Love, Pt. 1 whilst the remix featuring Bia is a standalone single.)	2018	—	—	—	—	—	—	—	—	—	—		Life After Love, Pt. 1
"New Love"	2018	—	—	—	—	—	—	—	—	—	—		Life After Love, Pt. 2
"Monopoly" (with Ariana Grande)	2019	69	—	—	21	38	15	76	19	21	23	ARIA: Gold; BPI: Silver; MC: Gold; RMNZ: Gold	Thank U, Next (Note: "Monopoly" is only included on the Japanese deluxe edition of Thank U, Next.)
"Ass Like That"	2019	—	—	—	—	—	—	—	—	—	—		Jaguar
"Moment"	2020	—	—	—	—	—	—	—	—	—	—		Jaguar
"Experience" (with Khalid and SG Lewis)	2020	—	—	—	—	—	—	—	—	—	—		Jaguar
"F.U.C.K."	2021	—	—	—	—	—	—	—	—	—	—		Non-album singles
"Coastin'"	2021	—	— (Note: "Coastin'" did not enter the Hot R&B/Hip-Hop Songs chart, but peaked at number 18 on the Adult R&B Songs chart.)	24	—	—	—	—	—	—	—		Non-album singles
"Smoke'" (featuring Lucky Daye)	2023	—	—	—	—	—	—	—	—	—	—		Jaguar II
"Party Girls'" (featuring Buju Banton)	2023	—	—	25	—	—	—	—	—	—	—		Jaguar II
"On My Mama"	2023	33	12	4	—	—	—	—	— (Note: "On My Mama" did not enter the NZ Top 40 Singles Chart, but peaked at number 35 on the NZ Hot Singles Chart.)	—	—	RIAA: Platinum; MC: Gold; RMNZ: Gold	Jaguar II
"Alright"	2024	—	— (Note: "Alright" did not enter the Hot R&B/Hip-Hop Songs chart, but peaked at number 43 on the R&B/Hip-Hop Airplay chart.)	13	—	—	—	—	—	—	—		Jaguar II
"SOS (Sex on Sight)" (featuring Usher)	2024	—	— (Note: "SOS (Sex on Sight)" did not enter the Hot R&B/Hip-Hop Songs chart, but peaked at number 14 on the R&B/Hip-Hop Airplay chart.)	12	—	—	—	—	—	—	—		Jaguar II
"Cam Girl" (with Ludmilla)	2025	—	—	—	—	—	—	—	—	—	—		Non-album single
"Let Me"	2026	—	— (Note: "Let Me" did not enter the Hot R&B/Hip-Hop Songs chart, but peaked at number 10 on the R&B/Hip-Hop Airplay chart.)	21	—	—	—	—	—	—	—		Frequency of Love
"Reach Out"	2026	—	— (Note: "Reach Out" did not enter the Hot R&B/Hip-Hop Songs chart, but peaked at number 34 on the R&B/Hip-Hop Airplay chart.)	21	—	—	—	—	—	—	—		Frequency of Love
"Juicy"	2026	—	—	—	—	—	—	—	— (Note: "Juicy" did not enter the NZ Top 40 Singles Chart, but peaked at number 36 on the NZ Hot Singles Chart.)	—	—		Frequency of Love
"See You in My Dreams" (featuring SZA)	2026	—	40	15	—	—	—	—	— (Note: "See You in My Dreams" did not enter the NZ Top 40 Singles Chart, but peaked at number 13 on the NZ Hot Singles Chart.)	—	—		Frequency of Love
"—" denotes a recording that did not chart or was not released in that territory.

=== As featured artist ===
List of singles as featured artist, showing year released and originating album
Title	Year	Peak chart positions			Certifications	Album
Title	Year	US Bub.	CAN	UK	Certifications	Album
"A Little More" (Machine Gun Kelly featuring Victoria Monét)	2015	8	81	—	RIAA: Gold	General Admission
"Breaking Point" (Remix) (Leon Thomas featuring Victoria Monét)	2023	—	—	—		Electric Dusk
"Offa Me" (Davido featuring Victoria Monét)	2025	—	—	93		5ive
"—" denotes a recording that did not chart or was not released in that territory.

=== Promotional singles ===
List of promotional singles, showing year released and originating album
Title	Year	Album
"Backyard"	2015	Nightmares & Lullabies: Act 1
"High Luv"	2015	Nightmares & Lullabies: Act 2
"Do You Like It"	2016	Life After Love, Pt. 2
"Dive"	2020	Jaguar
"Touch Me (Remix)" (featuring Kehlani)	2020	Non-album singles
"We Wish You a Merry Christmas"	2022	Non-album singles
"Nothing Feels Better"	2022	Non-album singles

== Other charted or certified songs ==
List of songs, with selected chart positions, showing year released and album name
Title	Year	Peak chart positions			Certifications	Album
Title	Year	US R&B	NZ Hot	UK DL	Certifications	Album
"Got Her Own" (with Ariana Grande)	2019	—	34	77		Charlie's Angels
"Jaguar"	2020	— (Note: "Jaguar" did not enter the Hot R&B Songs chart, but peaked at number 12 on the R&B Digital Song Sales chart.)	—	—		Jaguar
"We Might Even Be Falling In Love" (solo or with Bryson Tiller)	2020	—	—	—	RIAA: Gold; RMNZ: Gold	Jaguar and Jaguar II
"Girls Need Love (Girls Mix)" (with Summer Walker, Tyla and Tink)	2023	15	—	—		None
"Persuasion" (Bryson Tiller featuring Victoria Monét)	2024	14	38	—		Bryson Tiller
"That's Why I Love You" (featuring Bruno Mars)	2026	—	26	—		Frequency of Love
"—" denotes a recording that did not chart or was not released in that territory.

== Guest appearances ==
List of non-single guest appearances, with other performing artists, showing year released and originating album
Title	Year	Album	Artist(s)
"You Wouldn't Understand"	2012	Life Is Good	Nas
"Live on Tonight"	2012	Trouble Man: Heavy Is the Head	T.I.
"Somewhere"	2013	Born II Sing Vol. III	Eric Bellinger
"Stay"	2014	Paperwork	T.I.
"About My Issue"	2014	Paperwork	T.I. Nipsey Hussle
"Fear Warning"	2015	Trapnati	Hardo; Stevie B
"Losing"	2016	Summer on Sunset	Wale
"Kill"	2017	Drogas Light	Lupe Fiasco; Ty Dolla $ign
"The Amazing Mr. Fuck Up"	2018	Dime Trap	T.I.
"Got Her Own"	2019	Charlie's Angels	Ariana Grande
"Girls Need Love" (Girls Mix)	2023	None	Summer Walker; Tyla; Tink
"Spin"	2024	Megan	Megan Thee Stallion

== Production and songwriting ==
Year	Song	Artist(s)	Album
2010	"Perfect Nightmare"	Shontelle	No Gravity
2010	"Take Ova"	Shontelle	No Gravity
2010	"Evacuate My Heart"	Shontelle	No Gravity
2010	"I Hate That You Love Me"	Diddy - Dirty Money	Last Train to Paris
2011	"Masquerade"	Jasmine V	S(he) Be(lie)ve(d)
2011	"Just a Friend"	Jasmine V	S(he) Be(lie)ve(d)
2011	"The Breakup Song"	Jasmine V	S(he) Be(lie)ve(d)
2012	"You Wouldn't Understand"	Nas, Victoria Monét	Life Is Good
2012	"Sin City"	GOOD Music	Cruel Summer
2012	"Introduction"	T.I.	Trouble Man: Heavy Is the Head
2012	"Live on Tonight"	T.I., Victoria Monét	Trouble Man: Heavy Is the Head
2013	"Déjà Vu"	Coco Jones	Made Of
2013	"Visual Love"	Chrisette Michele	Better
2013	"Honeymoon Avenue"	Ariana Grande	Yours Truly
2013	"Daydreamin'"	Ariana Grande	Yours Truly
2014	"Intro"	Ariana Grande	My Everything
2014	"My Everything"	Ariana Grande	My Everything
2014	"Only 1"	Ariana Grande	My Everything
2014	"Cadillac Song"	Ariana Grande	My Everything
2015	"Everlasting Love"	Fifth Harmony	Reflection
2015	"Them Girls Be Like"	Fifth Harmony	Reflection
2015	"Reflection"	Fifth Harmony	Reflection
2015	"We Know"	Fifth Harmony	Reflection
2015	"Double Tap"	Jordin Sparks, 2 Chainz	Right Here, Right Now
2015	"A Little More"	Machine Gun Kelly, Victoria Monét	General Admission
2015	"Intro"	Ariana Grande	Christmas & Chill
2015	"Wit It This Christmas"	Ariana Grande	Christmas & Chill
2015	"December"	Ariana Grande	Christmas & Chill
2015	"Not Just on Christmas"	Ariana Grande	Christmas & Chill
2015	"True Love"	Ariana Grande	Christmas & Chill
2015	"Winter Things"	Ariana Grande	Christmas & Chill
2016	"Moonlight"	Ariana Grande	Dangerous Woman
2016	"Be Alright"	Ariana Grande	Dangerous Woman
2016	"Let Me Love You"	Ariana Grande, Lil Wayne	Dangerous Woman
2016	"Leave Me Lonely"	Ariana Grande, Macy Gray	Dangerous Woman
2016	"I Don't Care"	Ariana Grande	Dangerous Woman
2016	"Knew Better / Forever Boy"	Ariana Grande	Dangerous Woman
2016	"Step on Up"	Ariana Grande	Dangerous Woman
2016	"No Way"	Fifth Harmony	7/27
2017	"I Want You"	Sara Evans	Words
2018	"Goodnight n Go"	Ariana Grande	Sweetener
2018	"Pete Davidson"	Ariana Grande	Sweetener
2018	"Thank U, Next"	Ariana Grande	Thank U, Next
2019	"7 Rings"	Ariana Grande	Thank U, Next
2019	"Needy"	Ariana Grande	Thank U, Next
2019	"NASA"	Ariana Grande	Thank U, Next
2019	"Make Up"	Ariana Grande	Thank U, Next
2019	"Ghostin"	Ariana Grande	Thank U, Next
2020	"Do It"	Chloe x Halle	Ungodly Hour
2020	"Rather Be"	Brandy	B7
2020	"Ice Cream"	Blackpink, Selena Gomez	The Album
2020	"34+35"	Ariana Grande	Positions
2020	"Motive"	Ariana Grande, Doja Cat	Positions
2020	"My Hair"	Ariana Grande	Positions
2020	"Nasty"	Ariana Grande	Positions
2020	"West Side"	Ariana Grande	Positions
2020	"Love Language"	Ariana Grande	Positions
2021	"Test Drive"	Ariana Grande	Positions
2023	"Love Me Enough"	Nicki Minaj, Monica, Keyshia Cole	Pink Friday 2
2024	"Lights On"	Normani	Dopamine
2024	"Insomnia"	Normani	Dopamine
