= The Jaguar Tour =

2023 concert tour by Victoria Monét

- Tour by Victoria Monét
- Location: Europe; North America; South America
- Associated album: Jaguar; Jaguar II
- Start date: September 15, 2023
- End date: November 18, 2023
- Legs: 1
- No. of shows: 27
- Supporting acts: Alex Vaughn; Ambré; Kendra Jae; Lavish; Leon Thomas; Tanerélle; Tone Stith

Victoria Monét concert chronology
- The Jaguar Tour (2023); Frequency of Love Tour (2026)

The Jaguar Tour was the debut concert tour by American singer-songwriter Victoria Monét in support of her debut studio album Jaguar II and her fifth EP Jaguar. The tour was scheduled to commence on September 6, 2023, in Detroit, but due to venue changes, it commenced on September 15 at Washington, D.C. and concluded on November 18, 2023, in Salvador. Alex Vaughn, Ambré, Kendra Jae, Lavish, Leon Thomas, Tanerélle and Tone Stith will be supporting acts for select North American dates.

== Background ==
Victoria Monét's debut album was released on August 25, 2023, The album was announced on June 22, 2023. The albums lead single "Smoke" featuring Lucky Daye was released on March 24, 2023. Pre-ordering for the album started on the same day of announcement. On July 17, 2023, Monét revealed the titles of the album's eleven tracks.

Furthermore, into the ep's and album's promotion—three singles were released in promotion of Jaguar II, "Smoke" featuring Lucky Daye released on March 24, 2023, "Party Girls" featuring Buju Banton released on May 10, 2023, and "On My Mama" released on June 16, 2023. On July 6, 2023. Along with four singles released in promotion of Jaguar, "Ass Like That" released on October 22, 2019, "Moment" released on February 6, 2020, "Dive" released on April 21, 2020, and "Experience" released on June 19, 2020. Monét teased an upcoming tour on her social media accounts. On July 10, 2023, she announced dates for her debut headlining concert titled The Jaguar Tour. (Note: See the tour dates section for the list of shows.) Tour tickets went on sale July 14, 2023, along with three added dates in San Francisco, Los Angeles, and Chicago. On July 14, 2023, Minutes after tickets went on sale, the entire tour had been completely sold out.

== Set list ==
This set list is obtained from the September 15, 2023, show in Washington, D.C. It does not represent all shows throughout the tour.

1. "Moment"
2. "Big Boss"
3. "Ass Like That"
4. "Some Cut"
5. "Dive"
6. "How Does It Make You Feel"
7. "Stop! In the Name of Love" (The Supremes cover)
8. "Stop (Askin' Me 4Shyt)"
9. "Smoke" / "Smoke (Reprise)"
10. "Anytime"
11. "Touch Me"
12. "F.U.C.K."
13. "New Love"
14. "Do You Like It"
15. "Freak"
16. "Monopoly"
17. "Coastin'"
18. "We Might Even Be Falling in Love"
19. "SpottieOttieDopaliscious" (Band Interlude)
20. "Cadillac (A Pimp's Anthem)"
21. "Alright"
22. "Bam Bam" / "Party Girls" / "Baby Boy" (Mash Up)
23. "Experience"
24. "Jaguar"

Encore

25. "On My Mama"

== Tour dates ==
List of 2023 concerts, showing date, city, country, and opening acts.
Date	City	Country	Venue	Supporting act
September 15, 2023	Washington, D.C.	United States	Howard Theatre	Alex Vaughn
September 16, 2023	Philadelphia	United States	Theatre of Living Arts	Alex Vaughn
September 18, 2023	Charlotte	United States	The Fillmore Charlotte	Alex Vaughn
September 19, 2023	Atlanta	United States	Buckhead Theatre	Alex Vaughn
September 21, 2023	New Orleans	United States	Joy Theater	Ambré
September 22, 2023	Houston	United States	House of Blues Houston	Ambré
September 24, 2023	Dallas	United States	House of Blues Dallas	Ambré
September 26, 2023	Denver	United States	Cervantes Masterpiece Ballroom	Ambré
September 28, 2023	Paradise	United States	24 Oxford	Ambré
September 29, 2023	Phoenix	United States	The Van Buren	Ambré
October 1, 2023	San Diego	United States	SOMA	Lavi$h
October 3, 2023	San Francisco	United States	The Regency Ballroom	Lavi$h
October 4, 2023	San Francisco	United States	The Regency Ballroom	Tanerélle
October 6, 2023	Portland	United States	Wonder Ballroom	Lavi$h
October 7, 2023	Seattle	United States	The Showbox	Lavi$h
October 9, 2023	Sacramento	United States	Ace of Spades	Kendra Jae
October 11, 2023	Hollywood	United States	The Fonda Theatre	Ambré
October 12, 2023	Hollywood	United States	The Fonda Theatre	Leon Thomas; Tanerélle
October 16, 2023	New York City	United States	Terminal 5	Tone Stith
October 22, 2023	Chicago	United States	House of Blues Chicago	Lavi$h
October 23, 2023	Chicago	United States	House of Blues Chicago	Lavi$h
October 25, 2023	Royal Oak	United States	Royal Oak Music Theatre	Lavi$h
October 26, 2023	Toronto	Canada	History	Lavi$h
October 30, 2023	Boston	United States	Royale Boston	Alex Vaughn
November 12, 2023	London	England	Roundhouse	Bellah
November 15, 2023	London	England	KOKO	Tiana Major9
November 18, 2023 (Note: The concert on November 18, 2023, was a part of AFROPUNK Festival.)	Salvador	Brazil	Parque de Exposições Agropecuárias de Salvador	—N/a
