= BET Awards 2024 =

2024 American television program

2024 BET Awards
- Date: June 30, 2024
- Location: Peacock Theater, Los Angeles, California
- Presented by: Black Entertainment Television
- Hosted by: Taraji P. Henson

Highlights
- Most awards: Tyla, Usher, and Victoria Monét (2 each)
- Most nominations: Drake (7)
- Website: www.bet.com/shows/bet-awards.html

Television/radio coverage
- Network: BET; BET Her, MTV, MTV2, Nick@Nite, VH1, Pop TV, Paramount Network, Logo TV, CMT (simulcast)
- Runtime: 4:00:00
- Produced by: Jesse Collins; Connie Orlando; Jennae Rouzan-Clay; Dionne Harmon; Jamal Nosette (executive producers); Eric Cook; Brittany Brazil (co-executive producers)
- Directed by: Marcelo Gama

The 24th BET Awards took place on June 30, 2024, at the Peacock Theater in Los Angeles, California, to celebrate achievements in entertainment and honors music, sports, television, and movies. It was hosted for the third time by actress Taraji P. Henson.

The nominations were announced on May 16. Canadian rapper Drake received the most nominations with seven, followed by Nicki Minaj with six, J. Cole, Sexyy Red, SZA and Victoria Monét with five each, and Beyoncé, 21 Savage, Doja Cat, Megan Thee Stallion, Tyla, and Usher all with four.

R&B singer Usher received the Lifetime Achievement Award during the ceremony.

== Performers ==
The first round of performers was announced along with the nominees on May 16, 2024. Normani was scheduled to perform at the ceremony, but her performance was cancelled due to a leg injury during rehearsals.

Artist(s)	Song(s)
Main show
Megan Thee Stallion	"Hiss" "Boa" "Where Them Girls At"
Victoria Monét; Kaytranada	"On My Mama" "Alright"
Sexyy Red	"U My Everything" "Get It Sexyy"
VanVan; Heiress Harris	"Be You"
Will Smith; Fridayy; Sunday Service Choir; Kirk Franklin	"You Can Make It"
GloRilla; Megan Thee Stallion	"Yeah Glo!" "Wanna Be"
Shaboozey; J-Kwon	"A Bar Song (Tipsy)" "Tipsy"
Latto	"Sunday Service" "Big Mama"
Tyla; Gunna; Skillibeng	"Jump"
Doechii	"Rocket"
Ice Spice	"Phat Butt" "Think U the Shit (Fart)"
Childish Gambino; Keke Palmer; Summer Walker; Coco Jones; Marsha Ambrosius; Chlöe; Tinashe; Teyana Taylor; Victoria Monét; Latto	Tribute to Usher "U Don't Have to Call" "You Make Me Wanna..." "Good Good" "There Goes My Baby" "Superstar" "Good Kisser" "Nice & Slow" "Bad Girl" "Yeah!"
Lauryn Hill; YG Marley; Wyclef Jean	"The Miseducation of Lauryn Hill" "Lost Ones" "Survival" "Praise Jah in the Moonlight" "Fu-Gee-La"
BET Amplified Stage
Tanner Adell	"Buckle Bunny" "Cowboy Break My Heart"

== Winners and nominees ==
Below is the list of winners and nominees. Winners are listed first and highlighted in bold.

Album of the Year	Video of the Year
**Michael – Killer Mike**; 11:11 – Chris Brown; A Gift & a Curse – Gunna; American Dream – 21 Savage; Coming Home – Usher; For All the Dogs Scary Hours Edition – Drake; Jaguar II – Victoria Monét; Pink Friday 2 – Nicki Minaj	**"On My Mama" – Victoria Monét**; "Agora Hills" – Doja Cat; "All My Life" – Lil Durk featuring J. Cole; "Barbie World" – Nicki Minaj & Ice Spice with Aqua; "Bongos" – Cardi B featuring Megan Thee Stallion; "First Person Shooter" – Drake featuring J. Cole; "Good Good" – Usher, Summer Walker & 21 Savage; "Rich Baby Daddy" – Drake featuring Sexyy Red & SZA
Viewer's Choice Award	Best Collaboration
**"Texas Hold 'Em" – Beyoncé**; "Agora Hills" – Doja Cat; "All My Life" – Lil Durk featuring J. Cole; "Fukumean" – Gunna; "Lovin on Me" – Jack Harlow; "Made for Me" – Muni Long; "On My Mama" – Victoria Monét; "Rich Baby Daddy" – Drake featuring Sexyy Red & SZA; "Sensational" – Chris Brown featuring Davido & Lojay; "Water" – Tyla	**"All My Life" – Lil Durk featuring J. Cole**; "America Has a Problem (Remix)" – Beyoncé featuring Kendrick Lamar; "Barbie World" – Nicki Minaj & Ice Spice with Aqua; "Bongos" – Cardi B featuring Megan Thee Stallion; "Carnival" – ¥$, Ye & Ty Dolla Sign featuring Rich the Kid & Playboi Carti; "Don't Play with It (Remix)" – Lola Brooke featuring Latto & Yung Miami; "Everybody" – Nicki Minaj featuring Lil Uzi Vert; "Good Good" – Usher, Summer Walker & 21 Savage; "Rich Baby Daddy" – Drake featuring Sexyy Red & SZA
Best Male R&B/Pop Artist	Best Female R&B/Pop Artist
**Usher**; Brent Faiyaz; Bryson Tiller; Burna Boy; Chris Brown; Drake; Fridayy; October London	**SZA**; Beyoncé; Coco Jones; Doja Cat; H.E.R.; Muni Long; Tyla; Victoria Monét
Best Female Hip Hop Artist	Best Male Hip Hop Artist
**Nicki Minaj**; Cardi B; Doja Cat; GloRilla; Ice Spice; Latto; Megan Thee Stallion; Sexyy Red	**Kendrick Lamar**; 21 Savage; Burna Boy; Drake; Future; Gunna; J. Cole; Lil Wayne
Best New Artist	Best Group
**Tyla**; 41; 4Batz; Ayra Starr; BossMan Dlow; Fridayy; October London; Sexyy Red	¥$; 2 Chainz & Lil Wayne; 41; Blxst & Bino Rideaux; City Girls; FLO; Maverick City Music; Wanmor
BET Her Award	Dr. Bobby Jones Best Gospel/Inspirational Award
**"On My Mama" – Victoria Monét**; "16 Carriages" – Beyoncé; "Blessings" – Nicki Minaj featuring Tasha Cobbs Leonard; "Commas" – Ayra Starr; "Fly Girl" – FLO featuring Missy Elliott; "Hiss" – Megan Thee Stallion; "Saturn" – SZA; "Yeah Glo!" – GloRilla	**"Me & U" – Tems**; "Award All of the Glory" – Shirley Caesar; "All Things" – Kirk Franklin; "Angel" – Halle; "Come Jesus Come" – CeCe Winans; "Do You Believe in Love?" – Erica Campbell; "God Problems" – Maverick City Music, Naomi Raine & Chandler Moore; "Try Love" – Kirk Franklin
Video Director of the Year	Best Movie
**Cole Bennett**; Benny Boom; Child.; Dave Meyers; Janelle Monáe & Alan Ferguson; Offset; Tems; Tyler, the Creator	**Bob Marley: One Love**; American Fiction; Renaissance; Spider-Man: Across the Spider-Verse; The Book of Clarence; The Color Purple; The Equalizer 3; The Little Mermaid
Best Actor	Best Actress
**Denzel Washington**; Anthony Mackie; Colman Domingo; Damson Idris; Donald Glover; Idris Elba; Jeffrey Wright; Lakeith Stanfield	**Regina King**; Angela Bassett; Ayo Edebiri; Coco Jones; Danielle Brooks; Fantasia Barrino; Halle Bailey; Issa Rae
Sportswoman of the Year	Sportsman of the Year
**Angel Reese**; A'ja Wilson; Coco Gauff; Flau'jae Johnson; Juju Watkins; Naomi Osaka; Sha'Carri Richardson; Simone Biles	**Jalen Brunson**; Anthony Edwards; Gervonta Davis; Jalen Hurts; Kyrie Irving; LeBron James; Patrick Mahomes; Stephen Curry
Best International Act	Best New International Act
**Tyla (South Africa)**; Asake (Nigeria); Aya Nakamura (France); Ayra Starr (Nigeria); BK' (Brazil); Cleo Sol (UK); Focalistic (South Africa); Karol Conká (Brazil); Raye (UK); Tiakola (France)	**Makhadzi (South Africa)**; Bellah (UK); Cristale (UK); Duquesa (Brazil); Holly G (France); Jungeli (France); Oruam (Brazil); Seyi Vibez (Nigeria); Tyler ICU (South Africa)
YoungStars Award	Lifetime Achievement Award
**Blue Ivy Carter**; Akira Akbar; Demi Singleton; Heiress Diana Harris; Jabria McCullum; Jalyn Hall; Leah Jeffries; Van Van	**Usher**

== In Memoriam ==
- Rico Wade
- Clarence Avant
- Maurice Hines
- Amp Fiddler
- Willie Mays
- Richard Roundtree
- Ron Cephas Jones
- Rudolph Isley
- Magoo
- Irish Grinstead
- The 45 King
- DJ Casper
- George "Funky" Brown
- Mister Cee
- Louis Gossett Jr.
- Brother Marquis
- Carl Weathers
- Dexter Scott King
- Aaron Spears
- Bo$$
- Hydeia Broadbent
- O. J. Simpson
- Joe E.M. Falcon II
- Rob Stone
- Bill Cobbs
