= 2023 Soul Train Music Awards =

Music awards ceremony in Los Angeles, US

- Date: November 26, 2023
- Location: House Party, Los Angeles, California
- Country: United States
- Hosted by: Keke Palmer
- Most awards: SZA (4)
- Most nominations: SZA; Usher; Summer Walker; (9 each)
- Website: www.bet.com/shows/soul-train-awards/

Television/radio coverage
- Network: BET, BET Her, VH1, MTV2
- Produced by: Jesse Collins Entertainment, Black Entertainment Television

The 2023 Soul Train Music Awards was held on November 26, 2023, recognizing the best in soul, R&B and hip-hop music. The ceremony aired on BET and simulcast on BET Her, VH1 and MTV2. The nominees were announced on November 1, 2023; SZA, Usher and Summer Walker led with nine nominations each, followed by 21 Savage with eight, and Coco Jones and Victoria Monét each having received six nominations.

SZA won four awards, including Album of the Year and Song of the Year, followed by Usher with three and Victoria Monét with two. American rapper, songwriter and record producer T-Pain was recognized with the Legend Award, while American singer-songwriter and actress Janelle Monáe was honored with the Spirit of Soul Award.

== Special awards ==
Honorees are as listed below:

=== Legend Award ===
- T-Pain

=== Spirit of Soul Award (presented by Carol's Daughter) ===
- Janelle Monáe

== Winners and nominees ==
Nominees are listed. The winners are listed in bold.

Album of the Year	Song of the Year
**SOS – SZA**; The Age of Pleasure – Janelle Monáe; Age/Sex/Location – Ari Lennox; Clear 2: Soft Life EP – Summer Walker; Girls Night Out (Extended) – Babyface; I Told Them... – Burna Boy; Jaguar II – Victoria Monét; What I Didn't Tell You (Deluxe) – Coco Jones	**"Snooze" – SZA**; "Back to Your Place" – October London; "Favorite Song" – Toosii; "Good Good" – Usher, Summer Walker & 21 Savage; "ICU" – Coco Jones; "Kill Bill" – SZA; "Lipstick Lover" – Janelle Monáe; "On My Mama" – Victoria Monét
Best R&B/Soul Female Artist	Best R&B/Soul Male Artist
**SZA**; Ari Lennox; Beyoncé; Coco Jones; H.E.R.; Janelle Monáe; Summer Walker; Victoria Monét	**Usher**; 6lack; Babyface; Brent Faiyaz; Burna Boy; Chris Brown; Eric Bellinger; October London
Best New Artist	Soul Train Certified Award
**Coco Jones**; Ambré; Ayra Starr; Doechii; Flo; Fridayy; Tyla; WanMor	**Usher**; Anthony Hamilton; Ashanti; Ciara; Eric Bellinger; Monica; PJ Morton; Ronald Isley & The Isley Brothers; T-Pain
Best Gospel/Inspirational Award	Video of the Year
**"All Things" – Kirk Franklin**; "All the Glory" – Shirley Caesar; "Came Too Far" – Fridayy featuring Maverick City Music & My Mom; "Cry" – Koryn Hawthorne; "Feel Alright (Blessed)" – Erica Campbell; "God Problems" – Maverick City Music, Chandler Moore & Naomi Raine; "The Journey" – H.E.R.; "Try Love" – Kirk Franklin	**"On My Mama" – Victoria Monét**; "Back to Your Place" – October London; "Boy's a Liar, Pt. 2" – PinkPantheress & Ice Spice; "Boyfriend" – Usher; "Good Good" – Usher, Summer Walker & 21 Savage; "ICU" – Coco Jones; "Kill Bill" – SZA; "Lipstick Lover" – Janelle Monáe; "Special" – Lizzo
Best Dance Performance	Best Collaboration
**"On My Mama" – Victoria Monét**; "Better Thangs" – Ciara featuring Summer Walker; "Boyfriend" – Usher; "Good Good" – Usher, Summer Walker & 21 Savage; "How We Roll" – Ciara & Chris Brown; "Snooze" – SZA; "Summer Too Hot" – Chris Brown; "Under the Influence" – Chris Brown	**"Good Good" – Usher, Summer Walker & 21 Savage**; "America Has a Problem (Remix)" – Beyoncé featuring Kendrick Lamar; "Boy's a Liar, Pt. 2" – PinkPantheress & Ice Spice; "Creepin' (Remix)" – Metro Boomin, The Weeknd, 21 Savage & Diddy; "Fly Girl" – Flo featuring Missy Elliott; "Sittin' on Top of the World" – Burna Boy featuring 21 Savage; "Special (Remix)" – Lizzo featuring SZA; "To Summer, From Cole (Audio Hug)" – Summer Walker & J. Cole
The Ashford & Simpson Songwriter's Award
**"Snooze" – Written by SZA, Babyface, Blair Ferguson, Khris Riddick-Tynes and Leon Thomas (SZA)**; "Back to Your Place" – Written and performed by October London; "Favorite Song" – Written by Toosii, Adelso Sicaju and Tatiana Manaois (Toosii); "Good Good" – Written by Usher, 21 Savage, Paul Dawson, Melvin Hough II, Caleb Ishman, Rafael Ishman, Jaylyn Denaie MacDonald, Tauren Stovall, Keith Thomas and Rivelino Wouter (Usher, Summer Walker & 21 Savage); "ICU" – Written by Coco Jones, Darhyl Camper Jr., Raymond Komba and Roy Keisha Rockette (Coco Jones); "Kill Bill" – Written by SZA, Rob Bisel and Carter Lang (SZA); "On My Mama" – Written by Victoria Monét, Dernst Emile II, Jeff Gitelman, Kyla Moscovich, Jamil Pierre and Charles Williams (Victoria Monét); "Sittin' on Top of the World" – Written by Burna Boy, 21 Savage, Fred Jerkins III, Isaac Phillips, LaShawn Daniels, Mason Betha, Matthieu Le Carpentier, Nycolia "Tye-V" Turman, Rodney Jerkins and Traci Hale (Burna Boy featuring 21 Savage)
