= Colin Leonard =

Mastering engineer and musician

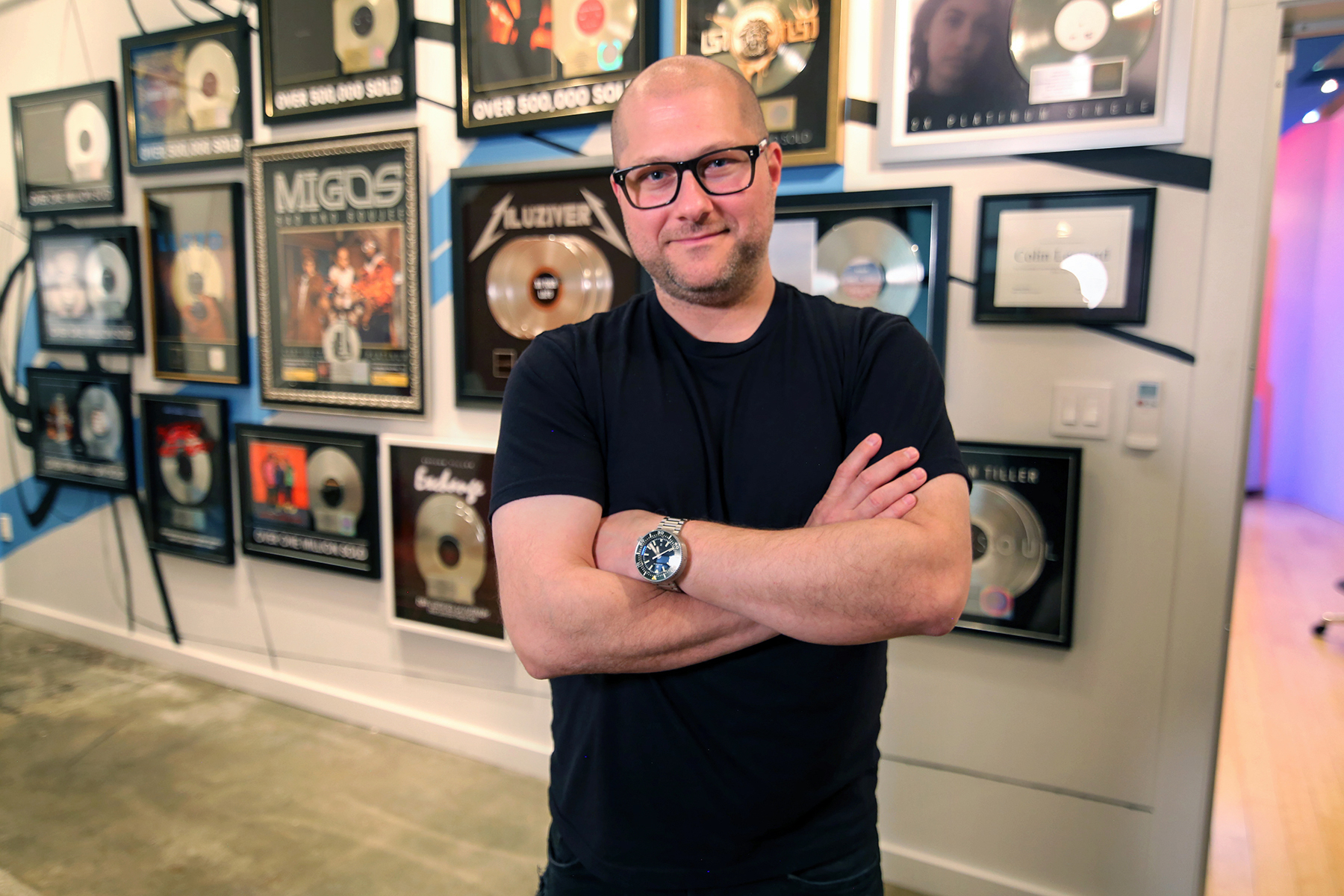
- Leonard in 2018

Background information
- Born: Colin Leonard
- Occupations: Mastering engineer; mixer
- Instrument: Guitar
- Years active: 2000–present
- Website: singmastering.com

Colin Leonard (known professionally as "the Phantom") is an American mastering engineer and founder of SING Mastering. He has won three Grammy Awards (Jaguar II, Cowboy Carter, Debí Tirar Más Fotos) and one Latin Grammy Award (Debí Tirar Más Fotos) as well as being nominated for 18 Grammy Awards and 16 Latin Grammy Awards. He has more than 9,500 credits and has worked with artists including Bad Bunny, Beyoncé, Justin Bieber, Jay-Z, Paul McCartney, and Elton John.

== Career ==
Leonard took piano lessons as a child and began playing the drums at the age of 12. In his early 20s, he began performing in bands and producing instrumentals for hip hop artists. He studied classical guitar at the University of the Pacific, and attended Full Sail University, studying recording arts, from which he graduated in 1997. Leonard then moved to Atlanta with an entourage of band members from his jazz/fusion band, for whom he began mixing audio.

Leonard is the owner of the Atlanta-based studio SING Mastering, and is the creator of Aria Mastering, the automatic analog mastering service with a robotic arm.

He won a Pensado Award for Master of Mastering in 2017, and placed number two on Jaxsta's "Top Mastering Engineers of 2022 - The world's 50 Most Successful Mastering Engineers of 2022", citing his work for Beyoncé, Cardi B, Wizkid, Charlie Puth, and Lil Uzi Vert.

Leonard has mastered music for Justin Bieber, Lil Baby, Jack Harlow, Lil Wayne, Beck, Gucci Mane, and Future, among others. He has been nominated for 16 Grammy Awards, winning two, and has received 13 Latin Grammy Award nominations.

== Grammy Awards ==
Awards and nominations received by Colin Leonard
Year	Nominated work	Artist	Category	Result	Ref.
2019	"I Like It"	Cardi B, Bad Bunny, and J Balvin	Record of the Year	Nominated	
2019	Invasion of Privacy	Cardi B	Album of the Year	Nominated	
2020	"Hard Place"	H.E.R.	Record of the Year	Nominated	
2022	"Peaches"	Justin Bieber	Record of the Year	Nominated	
2022	"Savage Remix"	Megan Thee Stallion featuring Beyoncé	Record of the Year	Nominated	
2022	"Black Parade"	Beyoncé	Record of the Year	Nominated	
2022	Justice	Justin Bieber	Album of the Year	Nominated	
2022	Back of My Mind	H.E.R.	Album of the Year	Nominated	
2023	"Break My Soul"	Beyoncé	Record of the Year	Nominated	
2023	Renaissance	Beyoncé	Album of the Year	Nominated	
2023	Un Verano Sin Ti	Bad Bunny	Album of the Year	Nominated	
2024	Jaguar II	Victoria Monét	Best Engineered Album, Non-Classical	Won	
2024	"On My Mama"	Victoria Monét	Record of the Year	Nominated	
2025	"Texas Hold 'Em"	Beyoncé	Record of the Year	Nominated	
2025	Cowboy Carter	Beyoncé	Album of the Year	Won	
2025	Algorithm	Lucky Daye	Best Engineered Album, Non-Classical	Nominated	
2026	"DTMF"	Bad Bunny	Record of the Year	Nominated	
2026	Debí Tirar Más Fotos	Bad Bunny	Album of the Year	Won	

== Latin Grammy Awards ==
Year	Nominated work	Artist	Category	Role	Award	Result
2025	Debí Tirar Más Fotos	Bad Bunny	Album of the Year	Mastering engineer	Latin Grammy Award	Won
2025	DTMF	Bad Bunny	Record of the Year	Mastering engineer	Latin Grammy Award	Nominated
2025	Baile Inolvidable	Bad Bunny	Record of the Year	Mastering engineer	Latin Grammy Award	Nominated
2024	Mi Ex Tenía Razón	Karol G	Record of the Year	Mastering engineer	Latin Grammy Award	Nominated
2024	Mónaco	Bad Bunny	Record of the Year	Mastering engineer	Latin Grammy Award	Nominated
2022	Aire (Versión Dia)	Jesse & Joy	Best Engineered Album	Mastering engineer	Latin Grammy Award	Nominated
2022	Ojitos Lindos	Bad Bunny and Bomba Estéreo	Record of the Year	Mastering engineer	Latin Grammy Award	Nominated
2022	Un Verano Sin Ti	Bad Bunny	Record of the Year	Mastering engineer	Latin Grammy Award	Nominated
2022	Envolver	Anitta	Record of the Year	Mastering engineer	Latin Grammy Award	Nominated
2021	El Último Tour Del Mundo	Bad Bunny	Album of the Year	Mastering engineer	Latin Grammy Award	Nominated
2020	Oasis	Bad Bunny and J Balvin	Album of the Year	Mastering engineer	Latin Grammy Award	Nominated
2020	Vete	Bad Bunny	Record of the Year	Mastering engineer	Latin Grammy Award	Nominated
2020	Colores	J Balvin	Album of the Year	Mastering engineer	Latin Grammy Award	Nominated
2020	YHLQMDLG	Bad Bunny	Album of the Year	Mastering engineer	Latin Grammy Award	Nominated

== Selected discography ==
Year	Album/song	Artist	Credit
2025	Debí Tirar Más Fotos	Bad Bunny	Mastering engineer
2025	Fancy That	PinkPantheress	Mastering engineer
2025	Here for It All	Mariah Carey	Mastering engineer
2025	Am I the Drama?	Cardi B	Mastering engineer
2025	Beloved	Giveon	Mastering engineer
2025	The Leaks	Lil Baby	Mastering engineer
2025	Love & Fear	Zac Brown Band	Mastering engineer
2025	Heart of Mine	PJ Morton and Darrel Walls	Mastering engineer
2025	Finally Over It	Summer Walker	Mastering engineer
2025	Haunted by Fame	Offset	Mastering engineer
2025	Cape Town to Cairo (Live)	PJ Morton and Afro Orleans	Mastering engineer
2025	30.	Queen Naija	Mastering engineer
2025	Episodes	Gucci Mane	Mastering engineer
2025	Ophanim	Voices of Fire	Mastering engineer
2025	Kiari	Offset	Mastering engineer
2025	Island Boyz	Myke Towers	Mastering engineer
2025	Margiela	Ken Carson	Mastering engineer
2025	I Aint Feeling You	EST Gee	Mastering engineer
2024	Cowboy Carter	Beyoncé	Mastering engineer
2024	Where I've Been, Isn't Where I'm Going	Shaboozey	Mastering engineer
2024	Megan: Act II	Megan Thee Stallion	Mastering engineer
2024	The Drive Home	Samara Cyn	Mastering engineer
2024	Crack Music 3	Skilla Baby	Mastering engineer
2024	Jaded	Toosii	Mastering engineer
2024	Speak Now	Moneybagg Yo	Mastering engineer
2024	Trouble in Paradise	Chlöe	Mastering engineer
2024	Algorithm	Lucky Daye	Mastering engineer
2024	Never Gets Late Here	Shenseea	Mastering engineer
2024	Genre: Sadboy	MGK	Mastering engineer
2024	Tyla	Tyla	Mastering engineer
2024	The Glorification of Sadness	Paloma Faith	Mastering engineer
2023	Formentera II	Metric	Mastering engineer
2023	"Grown Woman"	Beyoncé	Mastering engineer
2022	Renaissance	Beyoncé	Mastering engineer
2022	Traumazine	Megan Thee Stallion	Mastering engineer
2022	Un Verano Sin Ti	Bad Bunny	Mastering engineer
2022	It's Only Me	Lil Baby	Mastering engineer
2022	Hotel Lobby (Unc & Phew)	Quavo and Takeoff	Mastering engineer
2021	"Peaches"	Justin Bieber	Mastering engineer
2021	Justice	Justin Bieber	Mastering engineer
2021	Find My Way	Paul McCartney and Beck	Mastering engineer
2021	Learn to Fly	Surfaces (featuring Elton John)	Mastering engineer
2021	"Up"	Cardi B	Mastering engineer
2021	The Voice of the Heroes	Lil Baby and Lil Durk	Mastering engineer
2021	Still Over It	Summer Walker	Mastering engineer
2021	Back of My Mind	H.E.R.	Mastering engineer
2020	High Off Life	Future	Mastering engineer
2020	Thats What They All Say	Jack Harlow	Mastering engineer
2020	Changes	Justin Bieber	Mastering engineer
2020	"Mood"	24kGoldn (featuring Iann Dior)	Mastering engineer
2020	Pluto × Baby Pluto	Future and Lil Uzi Vert	Mastering engineer
2020	My Turn	Lil Baby	Mastering engineer
2020	Good Intentions	Nav	Mastering engineer
2020	Funeral	Lil Wayne	Mastering engineer
2020	Tickets to My Downfall	Machine Gun Kelly	Mastering engineer
2020	El Último Tour Del Mundo	Bad Bunny	Mastering engineer
2020	"Hawái"	Maluma	Mastering engineer
2020	"Savage Remix"	Megan Thee Stallion (featuring Beyoncé)	Mastering engineer
2020	"WAP"	Cardi B (featuring Megan Thee Stallion)	Mastering engineer
2020	"Whats Poppin"	Jack Harlow	Mastering engineer
2020	Detroit 2	Big Sean	Mastering engineer
2020	Colores	J Balvin	Mastering engineer
2019	The Lion King: The Gift	Beyoncé	Mastering engineer
2019	Death Race for Love	Juice Wrld	Mastering engineer
2019	Hyperspace	Beck	Mastering engineer
2019	"Roses"	Saint Jhn	Mastering engineer
2018	Homecoming: The Live Album	Beyoncé	Mastering engineer
2018	Quavo Huncho	Quavo	Mastering engineer
2018	I Am > I Was	21 Savage	Mastering engineer
2018	Everything Is Love	The Carters	Mastering engineer
2018	Goodbye & Good Riddance	Juice WRLD	Mastering engineer
2018	Tha Carter V	Lil Wayne	Mastering engineer
2017	"I Like It"	Cardi B, Bad Bunny, and J Balvin	Mastering engineer
2017	American Teen	Khalid	Mastering engineer
2017	"Both"	Gucci Mane (featuring Drake)	Mastering engineer
2017	Culture	Migos	Mastering engineer
2016	"Bad and Boujee"	Migos	Mastering engineer
2016	Lil Boat	Lil Yachty	Mastering engineer
2013	This Is... Icona Pop	Icona Pop	Mastering engineer
2013	Detroit	Big Sean	Mastering engineer
2012	Late Nights: The Album	Jeremih	Mastering engineer
2011	Sorry 4 the Wait	Lil Wayne	Mastering engineer
2011	Finally Famous	Big Sean	Mastering engineer
2010	Flockaveli	Waka Flocka Flame	Mastering engineer
2009	The State vs. Radric Davis	Gucci Mane	Mastering engineer
2009	No Ceilings	Lil Wayne	Mastering engineer
