= Frequency of Love Tour =

2026 concert tour by Victoria Monét

- Tour by Victoria Monét
- Location: North America
- Associated album: Frequency of Love
- Start date: October 31, 2026
- End date: December 17, 2026
- Legs: 1
- No. of shows: 25
- Producer: Live Nation

Victoria Monét concert chronology
- The Jaguar Tour (2023); Frequency of Love Tour (2026)

Frequency of Love Tour is the ongoing second concert tour by American singer Victoria Monét, in support of her second studio album, Frequency of Love (2026). The tour is scheduled to consist of 25 shows across North America, beginning on October 31, 2026, at the 713 Music Hall in Houston, Texas, and concluding on December 17, 2026, at the Bill Graham Civic Auditorium in San Francisco, California. The tour comprises a single leg and is promoted and operated by Live Nation.

== Background ==
In 2026, Monét prepared the release of her second studio album, Frequency of Love, following her previous musical releases and touring activities. The album's campaign led to plans for a new headlining concert tour, which became her second tour as a headlining artist. The tour was developed as a North American run intended to support and promote material from Frequency of Love, while also incorporating songs from Monét's wider discography.

The Frequency of Love Tour was officially announced on September 10, 2026, through Monét's Instagram account. The announcement revealed a 27-date itinerary spanning October through December 2026. Live Nation was announced as the company responsible for running the tour.

The tour is scheduled to take place exclusively in the United States, with performances in multiple major cities and concert markets. Its itinerary consists of one continuous North American leg, beginning in late October and continuing throughout November and the first half of December.

== Tour dates ==
List of 2026 concerts
Date (2026)	City	Country	Venue	Attendance	Revenue
October 31	Houston	United States	713 Music Hall	—	—
November 2	Dallas	United States	South Side Ballroom	—	—
November 4	Atlanta	United States	Fox Theatre	—	—
November 5 (Note: The November 5, 2026, concert was originally scheduled for October 28, but was postponed due to production issues.)	Charlotte	United States	Ovens Auditorium (Note: The November 5, 2026, concert was originally scheduled to take place at Skyla Credit Union Amphitheatre, but was moved to the Ovens Auditorium due to production issues.)	—	—
November 7	Fort Lauderdale	United States	War Memorial Auditorium	—	—
November 8	Tampa	United States	Yuengling Center	—	—
November 12	Philadelphia	United States	The Met	—	—
November 13	Boston	United States	MGM Music Hall at Fenway	—	—
November 15	Detroit	United States	Fox Theatre	—	—
November 16	Milwaukee	United States	Landmark Credit Union Live	—	—
November 18	Chicago	United States	Aragon Ballroom	—	—
November 21	Toronto	Canada	Coca-Cola Coliseum	—	—
November 22	Pittsburgh	United States	Citizens Live at The Wylie	—	—
November 24	New York	United States	Infosys Theater at Madison Square Garden	—	—
November 27	Washington, D.C.	United States	The Anthem	—	—
November 30	Nashville	United States	The Truth	—	—
December 2	Austin	United States	ACL Live at the Moody Theater	—	—
December 5	Phoenix	United States	Arizona Financial Theatre	—	—
December 6	San Diego	United States	Cal Coast Credit Union Open Air Theatre	—	—
December 8	Inglewood	United States	YouTube Theater	—	—
December 9	Las Vegas	United States	Fontainebleau Las Vegas	—	—
December 12	Vancouver	Canada	Doug Mitchell Thunderbird Sports Centre	—	—
December 14	Seattle	United States	WaMu Theater	—	—
December 16	Sacramento	United States	Sacramento Memorial Auditorium	—	—
December 17	San Francisco	United States	Bill Graham Civic Auditorium	—	—

=== Cancelled shows ===
List of cancelled shows
Date	City	Country	Venue	Reason
October 27, 2026	Raleigh	United States	Red Hat Amphitheater	Production issues
October 30, 2026	New Orleans	United States	The Fillmore New Orleans	Production issues
