= October London =

American singer-songwriter (born 1986)

- Also known as: Sam London
- Born: Jared Samuel Erskine; October 17, 1986 (age 39); South Bend, Indiana, U.S.
- Genres: Soul; R&B
- Occupation: Singer-songwriter
- Instruments: Vocals; piano
- Years active: 2014–present
- Labels: Mortier; Cadillacc; Doggy Style; Death Row
- Website: octoberlondon.com

Jared Samuel Erskine (born October 17, 1986), known professionally as October London, is an American singer-songwriter. He signed to Death Row Records by Snoop Dogg in 2022 and released his studio album, The Rebirth of Marvin, in 2023. Its single, "Back to Your Place", topped the Billboard Adult R&B Songs chart and was nominated for three Soul Train Music Awards.

== Early life ==
Jared Samuel Erskine was born on October 17, 1986, in South Bend, Indiana, and grew up there. His mother was a singer and his father was a guitar player; he has stated that he first wanted to be a musician as a child because of his uncles, all singers, and seeing "how music brought everybody together" during the holidays. He began playing piano while in kindergarten. He also performed in a musical group, First Fam, in 2004.

== Career ==
Erskine began performing music professionally under the name Sam London in 2014. Prior to performing as October London, he was training to become a commercial truck driver. He released his debut single, "Black Man in America", in 2016, which was written about police brutality against Black men in the United States. A music video for the song was released in September 2016. He met record producer Jazze Pha through mutual friends, and, after Pha played London's song "Color Blind" for rapper Snoop Dogg, Snoop Dogg called London days before Super Bowl 50 in February 2016. London became the first signee to Snoop Dogg and Jazze Pha's joint record label Cadillacc Music in March 2016 and was later signed to Death Row Records after the dissolution of Cadillacc. He began touring with Snoop Dogg on his Mount Kushmore Tour later that year. He also performed on the High Road Tour with Snoop Dogg and Wiz Khalifa in the summer of 2016. His debut extended play (EP), Color Blind: Love, was released in December 2016 alongside a promotional 13-minute-long film and its follow-up, Color Blind: Hate & Happiness, was released through Jazze Pha and Snoop Dogg's imprint Cadillacc Music on April 7, 2017. London also created the theme song for the VH1 television series Martha & Snoop's Potluck Dinner Party and, in 2017, played a fictionalized version of himself on the Fox television series Empire.

London released the EPs, The Love Cassette and Bell Bottom Nights, in 2020 and 2022, respectively. Also in 2022, he began collaborating with Snoop Dogg and Claude Brooks on the animated children's music web series Doggyland. His studio album, The Rebirth of Marvin, was released in February 2023 and was a tribute to Marvin Gaye. His single "Back to Your Place" from the album marked his debut on a Billboard chart when it appeared on the Adult R&B Songs chart at number 22 in June 2023, eventually reaching number one in August and topping the chart for nine consecutive weeks by October. His EP, Jackpot, was released on June 22, 2023. In November 2023, he released The Greatest Gift a Christmas album, and performed at the 2023 Soul Train Music Awards, where he was also nominated for the award for Best R&B/Soul Male Artist. He released his single "Eternity" as part of the soundtrack for the 2023 film The Color Purple in December 2023. His national Rebirth of Marvin Tour took place from January to March in 2024.

== Musical style ==
London primarily makes soul and contemporary R&B music.

== Awards and nominations ==
List of awards and nominations, with award, year, category, nominated work, result, and reference shown
Award	Year	Category	Nominee(s)	Result	Ref.
Soul Train Music Awards	2023	Song of the Year	"Back to Your Place"	Nominated	
Soul Train Music Awards	2023	Video of the Year	"Back to Your Place"	Nominated	
Soul Train Music Awards	2023	The Ashford & Simpson Songwriter's Award	"Back to Your Place"	Nominated	
Soul Train Music Awards	2023	Best R&B/Soul Male Artist	Himself	Nominated	

== Discography ==
=== Studio albums ===
Year	Title	Peak Chart Positions	Details
2022	Please Leave a Message		Released: August 24, 2022; Label: Doggy Style Records; Format: Digital download, streaming
2022	Crypto Winter (The Dubstep/House Album)		Released: October 7, 2022; Label: Death Row Records; Format: Digital download, streaming
2023	The Rebirth of Marvin		Released: February 10, 2023; Label: Death Row; Format: Digital download, streaming
2023	The Greatest Gift		Released: November 17, 2023; Label: Death Row; Format: Digital download, streaming
2024	October Nights		Released: October 11, 2024; Label: Death Row; Format: Digital download, streaming

=== Extended plays ===
List of extended plays, with release date and label shown
Title	Details
The Introduction	Released: December 10, 2013; Label: Mortier Music; Format: Digital download, streaming
Color Blind: Love	Released: October 28, 2016; Label: Cadillacc Music; Format: Digital download, streaming
Color Blind: Hate & Happiness	Released: April 7, 2017; Label: Cadillacc; Format: Digital download, streaming
Technicolor	Released: March 3, 2023; Label: Death Row; Format: Digital download, streaming

=== Singles ===
==== As lead artist ====
List of singles as lead artist, with title, year released, album, and chart positions shown
Title	Year	Peak chart positions		Album
Title	Year	US R&B/HH Air.	US Adult R&B	Album
"Baila Conmigo" (featuring Tripp Caimbridge and Walter West)	2014	–	–	The Introduction
"Black Man in America"	2016	–	–	Color Blind: Love
"Kdb (Kisses Down Below)" (with Bcanic)	2016	–	–	Non-album singles
"Delorean"	2020	–		Non-album singles
"Quarantina"	2020	–		Non-album singles
"Our Last"	2020	–		Non-album singles
"LSD"	2021	–		Non-album singles
"Lime and Squeeze" (featuring Snoop Dogg)	2021	–	–	Gangsta Grillz: I Still Got It
"Tennessee Whiskey" (featuring Dean Dillon)	2021	–	–	Non-album singles
"I Want You"	2021	–		Non-album singles
"I Dont Give a Damn"	2021	–		Non-album singles
"Back to Your Place"	2023	–	1	The Rebirth of Marvin
"Mullholland Drive"	2023	–	1	The Rebirth of Marvin
"Eternity"	2023	–	–	The Color Purple (Music from and Inspired By)
"She Keeps Calling"	2024	28	–	October Nights

==== As featured artist ====
List of singles as featured artist, with title, year released, and album
Title	Year	Album
"Go On" (Snoop Dogg featuring October London)	2017	Neva Left
"What is This?" (Snoop Dogg featuring October London)	2017	Non-album single
"Funky Christmas" (Snoop Dogg featuring October London and Cocoa Sarai)	2020	Non-album single
"Touch Away" (Snoop Dogg featuring October London)	2022	Snoop Dogg Presents Death Row Summer 2022
"The Crown" (Ideal featuring October London and Benny the Butcher)	2023	Non-album single
"All I Want Is You" (Boney James featuring October London)	2024	Slow Burn

=== Guest appearances ===
List of guest appearances, with year released, other artist(s), and album name shown
Title	Year	Other artist(s)	Album	Notes
"We the Shit"	2013	Komain, Ballhead	The Life & Times of Brian James	
"Bananas"	2013	Komain, Tripp Caimbridge	The Life & Times of Brian James	
"Shut Up or Move On"	2013	Komain, Tripp Caimbridge	The Life & Times of Brian James	
"My Life, Pt. 2"	2013	Komain, Tripp Caimbridge	The Life & Times of Brian James	
"Put It Down"	2013	Komain	The Life & Times of Brian James	
"City to City"	2014	J-Live, Tanya Morgan	Around the Sun	
"Revolution"	2016	Snoop Dogg	Coolaid	
"My Last Name"	2017	Snoop Dogg	Make America Crip Again	
"Waves"	2018	Snoop Dogg	220	
"When Life Calls"	2018	Daz Dillinger	Dazamataz	
"In the Name of Jesus"	2018	Snoop Dogg	Snoop Dogg Presents Bible of Love	
"Dissolution of Marriage"	2021	Tha Dogg Pound	Dpg 4 Life	
"It Ain't Nuthin'"	2021	Snoop Dogg	The Addams Family 2 (Original Motion Picture Soundtrack)	
"Baila Conmigo"	2022	Snoop Dogg	Snoop Dogg Presents Death Row Summer 2022	
"Coming Back"	2022	Snoop Dogg, Nefertitti Avani	BODR	
"Get This Dick"	2022	Snoop Dogg, Lil Duval	BODR	
"Snoopy Don't Go"	2022	Snoop Dogg	BODR	
"Hotline"	2022	Snoop Dogg	Metaverse: The NFT Drop, Vol. 2	
"That's On Me"	2023	Jane Handcock	World of Women	
"Wine Mackin"	2023	Tim October	October 4 Eva	
"Fake"	2023	Westcoast Stone	Thats That Drip	

== Filmography ==
=== Television ===
Year	Title	Role	Notes
2017	Empire	Himself	Episode: "Civil Hands Unclean"
2026	The Varnell Hill Show	Himself / Musical Guest	Episode: "#OHSHIT"
