= Soul Train Music Award for Best New Artist =

Annual US music award

This page lists the winners and nominees for the Soul Train Music Award for Best New Artist. The award has been given out every year since the first annual Soul Train Music Awards in 1987.

== Winners and nominees ==
Winners are listed first and highlighted in bold.

=== 1980s ===
Year	Artist	Ref
1987
1987	**Gregory Abbott**	
1987	Club Nouveau	
1987	The Jets	
1987	Shirley Murdock	
1988
1988	**Miki Howard**	
1988	Terence Trent D'Arby	
1988	Exposé	
1988	Shanice	
1989
1989	**Al B. Sure!**	
1989	Guy	
1989	Karyn White	
1989	BeBe & CeCe Winans	

=== 1990s ===
Year	Artist	Ref
1990
1990	**David Peaston**	
1990	Eric Gable	
1990	Soul II Soul	
1990	Young MC	
1991
1991	**Mariah Carey**	
1991	Oleta Adams	
1991	En Vogue	
1991	Vanilla Ice	
1992
1992	**Boyz II Men**	
1992	Color Me Badd	
1992	Jodeci	
1992	Lisa Fischer	
1993
1993	**Mary J. Blige**	
1993	Arrested Development	
1993	Kris Kross	
1993	Shai	
1994
1994	**H-Town**	
1994	Angie and Debbie	
1994	Tag Team	
1994	Xscape	
1995
1995	**Brandy**	
1995	69 Boyz	
1995	Aaliyah	
1995	Tanya Blount	
1996
1996	**D'Angelo**	
1996	Faith Evans	
1996	Junior M.A.F.I.A.	
1996	Monica	
1997
1997	**Maxwell**	
1997	112	
1997	AZ Yet	
1997	Tony Rich	
1998
1998	**Erykah Badu**	
1998	God's Property from Kirk Franklin's Nu Nation	
1998	Missy Elliott	
1998	Puff Daddy	
1999
1999	**Kelly Price**	
1999	Lord Tariq and Peter Gunz	
1999	Mýa	
1999	Trin-i-tee 5:7	

=== 2000s ===
Year	Artist	Ref
2000
2000	**Juvenile**	
2000	Eve	
2000	Ideal	
2000	Angie Stone	
2001
2001	**Nelly**	
2001	Lil' Bow Wow	
2001	Jill Scott	
2001	Carl Thomas	
2002
2002	**Alicia Keys**	
2002	Fabolous	
2002	India.Arie	
2002	Bubba Sparxxx	
2003
2003	**Amerie**	
2003	Heather Headley	
2003	Nappy Roots	
2003	Tweet	
2004
2004	**Chingy**	
2004	G-Unit	
2004	Ruben Studdard	
2004	Kanye West	
2005
2005	**Ciara**	
2005	Fantasia	
2005	J-Kwon	
2005	John Legend	
2006
2006	**Chris Brown**	
2006	LeToya	
2006	Leela James	
2006	Lyfe Jennings	
2006	Bobby Valentino	
2007
2007	**Ne-Yo**	
2007	Lupe Fiasco	
2007	Rick Ross	
2007	Yung Joc	
2008	—N/a	
2009
2009	**Keri Hilson**	
2009	Drake	
2009	Jazmine Sullivan	
2009	Ryan Leslie	
2009	Solange	

=== 2010s ===
Year	Artist	Ref
2010	**Melanie Fiona**	
2010	B.o.B	
2010	Nicki Minaj	
2010	Dondria	
2011	**Miguel**	
2011	Marsha Ambrosius	
2011	Bruno Mars	
2011	Frank Ocean	
2012	**Elle Varner**	
2012	Robert Glasper	
2012	J. Cole	
2012	Luke James	
2012	Emeli Sandé	
2013	**K. Michelle**	
2013	Tamar Braxton	
2013	Bridget Kelly	
2013	Kendrick Lamar	
2013	TGT	
2014	**Nico & Vinz**	
2014	Jhené Aiko	
2014	August Alsina	
2014	Sevyn Streeter	
2014	Liv Warfield	
2014	Mack Wilds	
2015	**Jidenna**	
2015	Alessia Cara	
2015	Dej Loaf	
2015	Jussie Smollett	
2015	Tinashe	
2016	**Chance the Rapper**	
2016	Andra Day	
2016	Ro James	
2016	Tory Lanez	
2016	Anderson .Paak	
2016	Bryson Tiller	
2017	**SZA**	
2017	H.E.R.	
2017	Kevin Ross	
2017	Khalid	
2017	6lack	
2018	**Daniel Caesar**	
2018	Jorja Smith	
2018	Kali Uchis	
2018	Leon Thomas	
2018	Normani	
2018	Queen Naija	
2019	**Summer Walker**	
2019	Lucky Daye	
2019	Mahalia	
2019	Nicole Bus	
2019	Pink Sweat$	
2019	YK Osiris	

=== 2020s ===
Year	Artist	Ref
2020	**Snoh Aalegra**	
2020	Giveon	
2020	Layton Greene	
2020	Lonr.	
2020	SAINt JHN	
2020	Victoria Monét	
2021	**Yung Bleu**	
2021	Blxst	
2021	Capella Grey	
2021	Morray	
2021	Tems	
2021	Tone Stith	
2022	**Tems**	
2022	CKay	
2022	Coco Jones	
2022	Dixson	
2022	Doechii	
2022	Fireboy DML	
2022	Muni Long	
2022	Steve Lacy	
2023	**Coco Jones**	
2023	Ambré	
2023	Ayra Starr	
2023	Doechii	
2023	Flo	
2023	Fridayy	
2023	Tyla	
2023	WanMor	
