= Soul Train Music Award for Best Album of the Year =

Annual US music award

Soul Train Music Award for Album of the Year
- Awarded for: albums
- Country: United States
- Presented by: BET
- First award: 1997
- Currently held by: SZA – SOS

Highlights
- Most awards: Beyoncé (4)

This page lists the winners and nominees for the Soul Train Music Award for Best Album of the Year. Originally entitled Best R&B/Soul or Rap Album of the Year, it was first awarded during the 1997 ceremony. It was renamed to its current title during the 2004 ceremony. During the years 2005 to 2008, the category was separated to award female, male and group albums separate awards.

Beyoncé is the biggest winner with four wins.

== Winners and nominees ==
Winners are listed first and highlighted in bold.

=== 1990s ===
Year	Artist	Album	Ref
1997
1997	**2Pac**	**All Eyez on Me**	
1997	The Fugees	The Score	
1997	R. Kelly	R. Kelly	
1997	Outkast	ATLiens	
1998
1998	**Erykah Badu**	**Baduizm**	
1998	Mary J. Blige	Share My World	
1998	The Notorious B.I.G.	Life After Death	
1998	Puff Daddy and the Family	No Way Out	
1999
1999	**Lauryn Hill**	**The Miseducation of Lauryn Hill**	
1999	Erykah Badu	Erykah Badu Live	
1999	DMX	It's Dark and Hell Is Hot	
1999	Jay Z	Vol. 2... Hard Knock Life	

=== 2000s ===
Year	Artist	Album	Ref
2000
2000	**R. Kelly**	**R.**	
2000	Mary J. Blige	Mary	
2000	DMX	Flesh of My Flesh, Blood of My Blood	
2000	TLC	FanMail	
2001
2001	**Dr. Dre**	**Dr. Dre 2001**	
2001	Eminem	The Marshall Mathers LP	
2001	Jay Z	The Dynasty: Roc La Familia	
2001	R. Kelly	TP-2.com	
2002
2002	**Jay Z**	**The Blueprint**	
2002	Aaliyah	Aaliyah	
2002	Ja Rule	Pain Is Love	
2002	Alicia Keys	Songs in A Minor	
2003
2003	**Nelly**	**Nellyville**	
2003	Ashanti	Ashanti	
2003	LL Cool J	10	
2003	Nas	Stillmatic	
2004
2004	**OutKast**	**Speakerboxxx/The Love Below**	
2004	Beyoncé	Dangerously in Love	
2004	R. Kelly	Chocolate Factory	
2004	Luther Vandross	Dance with My Father	
2005 – 2008	—N/a		
2009
2009	**Beyoncé**	**I Am... Sasha Fierce**	
2009	Jamie Foxx	Intuition	
2009	Kanye West	808s & Heartbreak	
2009	Maxwell	Blacksummers'night	
2009	Ne-Yo	Year of the Gentleman	
2009	LeToya Luckett	Lady Love (album)	
2009	Keri Hilson	In a Perfect World...	

=== 2010s ===
Year	Artist	Album	Ref
2010	**Usher**	**Raymond vs. Raymond**	
2010	Alicia Keys	The Element of Freedom	
2010	Sade	Soldier of Love	
2010	Drake	Thank Me Later	
2010	Erykah Badu	New Amerykah Part Two (Return of the Ankh)	
2011	**Chris Brown**	**F.A.M.E.**	
2011	Adele	21	
2011	Beyoncé	4	
2011	Jay Z and Kanye West	Watch the Throne	
2011	Jill Scott	The Light of the Sun	
2011	Trey Songz	Passion, Pain & Pleasure	
2012	**Frank Ocean**	**Channel Orange**	
2012	Eric Benét	The One	
2012	Nas	Life is Good	
2012	R. Kelly	Write Me Back	
2012	Usher	Looking 4 Myself	
2013	**Kendrick Lamar**	**Good Kid, M.A.A.D City**	
2013	Fantasia	Side Effects of You	
2013	Jay Z	Magna Carta Holy Grail	
2013	Miguel	Kaleidoscope Dream	
2013	Rihanna	Unapologetic	
2013	Justin Timberlake	The 20/20 Experience	
2014	**Beyoncé**	**Beyoncé**	
2014	Drake	Nothing Was the Same	
2014	Michael Jackson	Xscape	
2014	John Legend	Love in the Future	
2014	Janelle Monáe	The Electric Lady	
2014	Pharrell Williams	Girl	
2015	**The Weeknd**	**Beauty Behind the Madness**	
2015	Chris Brown	X	
2015	D'Angelo and the Vanguard	Black Messiah	
2015	Jill Scott	Woman	
2015	Tyrese	Black Rose	
2016	**Beyoncé**	**Lemonade**	
2016	DJ Khaled	Major Key	
2016	Drake	Views	
2016	Rihanna	Anti	
2016	Bryson Tiller	T R A P S O U L	
2016	Kanye West	The Life of Pablo	
2017	**Bruno Mars**	**24K Magic**	
2017	Mary J. Blige	Strength of a Woman	
2017	Solange	A Seat at the Table	
2017	SZA	Ctrl	
2017	The Weeknd	Starboy	
2018	**H.E.R.**	**H.E.R.**	
2018	Leon Bridges	Good Thing	
2018	Chris Brown	Heartbreak on a Full Moon	
2018	Chloe x Halle	The Kids Are Alright	
2018	The Internet	Hive Mind	
2018	Miguel	War & Leisure	
2019	**Lizzo**	**Cuz I Love You**	
2019	Ari Lennox	Shea Butter Baby	
2019	Chris Brown	Indigo	
2019	Ella Mai	Ella Mai	
2019	H.E.R.	I Used to Know Her	
2019	Khalid	Free Spirit	

=== 2020s ===
Year	Artist	Album	Ref
2020	**Summer Walker**	**Over It**	
2020	Brandy	B7	
2020	Chloe x Halle	Ungodly Hour	
2020	Chris Brown and Young Thug	Slime & B	
2020	Jhené Aiko	Chilombo	
2020	The Weeknd	After Hours	
2021	**Jazmine Sullivan**	**Heaux Tales**	
2021	Blxst	No Love Lost	
2021	Doja Cat	Planet Her	
2021	Giveon	When It's All Said and Done... Take Time	
2021	H.E.R.	Back of My Mind	
2021	Wizkid	Made in Lagos	
2022	**Beyoncé**	**Renaissance**	
2022	Mary J. Blige	Good Morning Gorgeous	
2022	Chris Brown	Breezy	
2022	Ari Lennox	Away Message	
2022	Lizzo	Special	
2022	Bruno Mars, Anderson .Paak, Silk Sonic	An Evening with Silk Sonic	
2022	Jazmine Sullivan	Heaux Tales, Mo' Tales: The Deluxe	
2022	Tank	R&B Money	
2023	**SZA**	**SOS**	
2023	Babyface	Girls Night Out (Extended)	
2023	Burna Boy	I Told Them...	
2023	Coco Jones	What I Didn't Tell You (Deluxe)	
2023	Ari Lennox	Age/Sex/Location	
2023	Janelle Monáe	The Age of Pleasure	
2023	Victoria Monét	Jaguar II	
2023	Summer Walker	Clear 2: Soft Life EP	

== See also ==
- Soul Train Music Award for Best R&B/Soul Album – Male
- Soul Train Music Award for Best R&B/Soul Album – Female
- Soul Train Music Award for Best R&B/Soul Album – Group, Band or Duo
