= Jaguar (EP) =

EP by Victoria Monét
- Released: August 7, 2020
- Recorded: 2018–2020
- Studios: Serenity West, Templebase Studios, Record Plant, Republic Records Studios (Los Angeles, California); Little Big Room Recording Studio, Speakeasy Studios (Burbank, California); Tailored 4U Music Studio (North Hollywood, California)
- Genres: R&B; funk; disco
- Length: 25:27
- Label: Tribe
- Producers: D'Mile; Tim Suby; xSDTRK; Deputy; SG Lewis; Bregma

Victoria Monét chronology
| Life After Love, Pt. 2 (2018) | Jaguar (2020) | Jaguar II (2023) |

Singles from Jaguar
- 1. "Ass Like That" Released: October 22, 2019; 2. "Moment" Released: February 6, 2020; 3. "Experience" Released: June 19, 2020

Jaguar is the fifth extended play (EP) by American singer-songwriter Victoria Monét, released on August 7, 2020 via Tribe Records and Platoon LTD. Stylistically an R&B project, with elements of funk and disco music, the EP was supported by three singles; "Ass Like That", "Moment", and "Experience" with Khalid and SG Lewis. A short film for the project was released on July 28, 2020.

Monét initially intended Jaguar to be a trilogy of EPs. However, as the second installment experienced a severe delay, the series was eventually reduced to only two parts, with Jaguar II now being her debut studio album.

Upon release, Jaguar received widespread acclaim from music critics, many of whom praised its musical direction and lyricism. The project was ranked in year-end lists by many publications. In support of both Jaguar and Jaguar II, Monét embarked on The Jaguar Tour in 2023.

== Background ==
After collaborating with Ariana Grande on the song "Monopoly" in April 2019, Monét revealed she had begun working on her next project. Monét was announced as Apple Music's Up Next artist in February 2020. On June 26, 2020, Monét officially announced the project on her social media simultaneously unveiling the cover art. On July 28, 2020, a short film was premiered with the album's track listing being revealed in the film, anticipating the album.

== Singles ==
On October 22, 2019, Monét released the lead single from Jaguar, "Ass Like That". The song was about loving oneself and accomplishing their personal goals. On February 6, 2020, Monét released the second single "Moment" with its music video being released on February 20. Monét would perform "Moment" and make her late night television debut on Jimmy Kimmel Live! in March 2020. This was followed by the promotional single, "Dive" on April 21, 2020. On June 19, 2020, Monét released the third official single, "Experience" with Khalid and SG Lewis, alongside the pre-order of the project.

A music video for the title track was premiered on the release date of the entire project.

== Critical reception ==
Professional ratings
Aggregate scores
| Source | Rating |
|---|---|
| Metacritic | 82/100 |
Review scores
| Source | Rating |
| Clash | 9/10 |
| The Guardian | 4/5 stars |
| The Independent | 4/5 stars |
| The Line of Best Fit | 8/10 |
| NME | 4/5 stars |
| Pitchfork | 7.1/10 |

Jaguar received widespread acclaim from music critics. At Metacritic, which assigns a normalised rating out of 100 to reviews from mainstream critics, the album has an average score of 82 based on seven reviews, indicating "universal acclaim". Nicolas-Tyrell Scott of NME gave Jaguar a 4-out-5-star-rating, and said "this record heralds [Monét] as one of the most enticing acts in R&B’s contemporary canon, near-guaranteed to become a bonafide star in her own right." Wongo Okon from Uproxx also gave the album a positive review, saying it "far exceeds her previous releases" thanks to her "sharp-as-ever pen and a sound that has been tweaked to accentuate her artistry."

Robin Murray of Clash gave the album a 9 out of 10 score and called Jaguar "a daring yet highly finessed triumph". He goes onto say "It's a wonderful experience, with Victoria Monét's stellar artistry balancing the sensuality of sound with a killer lyrical flair that aims straight for the heart." Dani Blum of Pitchfork gave Jaguar a score of 7.1 out of 10, noting that the project is "a sleek cocoon of funk-tinged R&B that excavates what it means to be in control."

=== Year-end lists ===
Jaguar on year-end lists
| Publication | List | Rank | Ref. |
|---|---|---|---|
| Associated Press | AP's Top Albums of 2020 | 9 | |
| The Line of Best Fit | The Best Albums of 2020 Ranked | 28 | |
| Noisey Music | The 100 Best Albums of 2020 | 10 | |
| NPR | The 50 Best Albums of 2020 | 20 | |
| Soul in Stereo | The 50 Best Albums of 2020 | 24 | |

== Track listing ==
Jaguar track listing
| No. | Title | Writer(s) | Producer(s) | Length |
|---|---|---|---|---|
| 1. | "Moment" | Victoria Monét; Dernst "D'Mile" Emile II; Tim Suby | D'Mile; Tim Suby | 2:59 |
| 2. | "Big Boss" (Interlude) | Monét; Emile | D'Mile | 1:31 |
| 3. | "Dive" | Monét; Emile; Yonatan "xSDTRK" Ayal; Kyla Moscovich | D'Mile; xSDTRK | 3:45 |
| 4. | "We Might Even Be Falling in Love" (Interlude) | Monét; Emile | D'Mile | 0:51 |
| 5. | "Jaguar" | Monét; Jamil M. Pierre; Emile | Deputy; D'Mile^{[a]} | 3:31 |
| 6. | "Experience" (with Khalid and SG Lewis) | Monét; Khalid Robinson; Samuel George Lewis; Moscovich | SG Lewis | 2:56 |
| 7. | "Ass Like That" | Monét; Emile; Jeremy Alexander Uribe; Dillan Beau Baillard; Donnell Stephens II; Kennedi Lykken | Bregma; D'Mile | 3:40 |
| 8. | "Go There with You" | Monét; Emile; Ayal | D'Mile; xSDTRK | 3:03 |
| 9. | "Touch Me" | Monét; Emile; Kenneth "Babyface" Edmonds | D'Mile | 3:11 |
| Total length: | | | | 25:27 |

Notes

- ^{^[a]} signifies an additional producer

== Charts ==
Chart performance for Jaguar
| Chart (2020) | Peak position |
|---|---|
| UK Album Downloads (Official Charts) | 36 |
| UK R&B Albums (Official Charts) | 14 |
| US Billboard 200 | 174 |
| US Independent Albums (Billboard) | 26 |
| US Heatseekers Albums (Billboard) | 1 |

== Release history ==
Release dates and formats for Jaguar
| Region | Date | Format(s) | Label | Ref. |
|---|---|---|---|---|
| Various | August 7, 2020 | Digital download; streaming | Tribe Records; Platoon | |
| Various | September 28, 2020 | LP | Tribe Records; Platoon | |
