= On My Mama =

2023 single by Victoria Monét

Single by Victoria Monét

from the album Jaguar II
- Released: June 16, 2023
- Genre: R&B; dance
- Length: 3:07
- Label: Lovett Music; RCA
- Songwriters: Victoria Monét; Jeff Gitelman; Dernst Emile II; Charles Williams; Kyla Moscovich; Jamil Pierre
- Producers: D'Mile; Jeff Gitelman; Deputy

Victoria Monét singles chronology
"Party Girls" (2023)	"On My Mama" (2023)	"Alright" (2024)

Music video
- "On My Mama" on YouTube

"On My Mama" is a song by American singer-songwriter Victoria Monét from her debut major label album Jaguar II. It was released on June 16, 2023, as the third single from the album via Lovett Music and RCA Records. The song samples the 2009 song "I Look Good" by American rapper Chalie Boy. The song was produced by D'Mile, Jeff Gitelman and Deputy and co-written by them alongside Monét, Kyla with additional credits to Chalie Boy. The song became Monét's first entry on the Billboard Hot 100 since her 2019 collaboration "Monopoly" with American singer Ariana Grande, entering at number 98 and peaking at number 33, becoming Monét's first top 40 hit.

The song and the music video received positive reviews. At the 66th Annual Grammy Awards, it was nominated for Record of the Year and Best R&B Song. It also won Best Dance Performance and Video of the Year at the Soul Train Music Awards.

== Background and lyrics ==
Monét performed her first headlining show on March 31, 2023 at the El Rey Theatre in Los Angeles. She included the at-the-time unreleased song in her set-list. The concert was met with much praise by critics and fans. She later confirmed the song would be included on her upcoming album in various interviews.

She officially announced the song's release in a video on June 5, on her social media platforms. The video contained an audio snippet of the song, and featured American comedian Druski dancing.

In an interview with Apple Music, Monét revealed that she wrote the song while experiencing postpartum depression. She stated in the interview, "I feel like it's a mix between something that makes you wanna dance, but also something that speaks light into you... even if you just sing the lyrics, you're talking good about yourself which I think is important for people".

The song prominently samples Chalie Boy's 2009 hit single "I Look Good" throughout its chorus, alongside the rapper appearing in the music video.

== Critical reception ==
The song received generally positive reviews. Laila Keaton of Intersect Magazine said, "This single is an unapologetic girl power track. Victoria Monét is confident and is proud to admit it... She has uniquely taken this sample and made it her own through her lyrical content while empowering her fans at the same time." Anna Gaca of Pitchfork stated the song is "extremely fun".

=== Accolades ===
Awards and nominations for Jaguar II
Organization	Year	Category	Result	Ref.
Soul Train Music Awards	2023	Song of the Year	Nominated	
Soul Train Music Awards	2023	The Ashford & Simpson Songwriter's Award	Nominated	
Soul Train Music Awards	2023	Best Dance Performance	Won	
Soul Train Music Awards	2023	Video of the Year	Won	
Grammy Awards	2024	Record of the Year	Nominated	
Grammy Awards	2024	Best R&B Song	Nominated	
NAACP Image Awards	2024	Outstanding Soul/R&B Song	Nominated	
NAACP Image Awards	2024	Outstanding Music Video/Visual Album	Nominated	
iHeartRadio Music Awards	2024	R&B Song of the Year	Nominated	

== Music video ==
The music video was directed by Child. Unlike her previous two singles, "Smoke" and "Party Girls" the video was not released simultaneously with the single. The video premiered on August 15, 2023, almost two months after the song was released and was choreographed by Sean Bankhead, who previously choreographed "Party Girls". It became Monét's fastest video to garner 1 million views.

The video was praised for its complex choreography and multiple references from the culture of the early 2000s. At the beginning of the video, Monét is dressed in a cropped, red, leather jacket with a red breast plate, baggy low-rise jeans, and a red Los Angeles Dodgers cap which paid homage to the singer & dancer Ciara. She is also seen wearing a light blue jersey dress which referenced the singer & dancer Mya. It also featured references to the fraternity Kappa Alpha Psi and sorority Delta Sigma Theta. Monét sports a plethora of Y2k inspired outfits. The video featured a cameo appearance by Chalie Boy, who is the rapper behind the song's interpolation. It also features Monét's real life mother L'Tanya Chestang-Cubit and her daughter Hazel Monét Gaines.

=== Reception ===
Kyle Denis of Billboard called the video an "absolute winner" and regarded the video "a nuanced, heartfelt tribute to 2000s Southern Black culture". Clash magazine writer Robin Murray felt that the video "is an explosive offering, highlighting Millennial R&B’s stretch and ambition". Larisha Paul of Rolling Stone called the choreography "slick". Paul also wrote, "This era is all about embracing that power unapologetically".

== Credits and personnel ==
- Victoria Monét – vocals, songwriting, composition
- Charles Williams (Chalie Boy) – vocals, songwriting
- Kyla Moscovich – instrumentation, songwriting, composition
- Dernst Emile II (D'Mile) – production, songwriting, composition
- Jeff Gitelman – production, songwriting, composition
- Jamil Pierre (Deputy) – production, songwriting, composition
- Colin Leonard – mastering
- Dale Becker – assistant mastering
- Patrizio Pigliapoco – mix engineering
- Todd Robinson – record engineering
- Katie Harvey – assistant engineering

== Charts ==
=== Weekly charts ===
Weekly chart performance for "On My Mama"
Chart (2023–2025)	Peak position
Japan Hot Overseas (Billboard Japan)	16
New Zealand Hot Singles (RMNZ)	35
US Billboard Hot 100	33
US Hot R&B/Hip-Hop Songs (Billboard)	12
US R&B/Hip-Hop Airplay (Billboard)	1
US Pop Airplay (Billboard)	16
US Rhythmic Airplay (Billboard)	2

=== Year-end charts ===
2024 year-end chart performance for "On My Mama"
Chart (2024)	Position
US Billboard Hot 100	91
US Hot R&B/Hip-Hop Songs (Billboard)	35
US Rhythmic (Billboard)	8

== Certifications ==
Certifications for "On My Mama"
Region	Certification	Certified units/sales
Canada (Music Canada)	Platinum	80,000^{‡}
New Zealand (RMNZ)	Gold	15,000^{‡}
United States (RIAA)	2× Platinum	2,000,000^{‡}
^{‡} Sales+streaming figures based on certification alone.
