= Soul Train Music Award for Best R&B/Soul Male Artist =

Annual US music award

This page lists the winners and nominees for the Soul Train Music Award for Best R&B/Soul Male Artist, which was first given in 2009. Trey Songz, Miguel, Maxwell, Bruno Mars and Chris Brown are the only artists to win the award twice.

== Winners and nominees ==
Winners are listed first and highlighted in bold.

=== 2000s ===
Year	Artist	Ref
2009
2009	**Maxwell**	
2009	Raphael Saadiq	
2009	Musiq Soulchild	
2009	Robin Thicke	
2009	Charlie Wilson	

=== 2010s ===
Year	Artist	Ref
2010	**Trey Songz**	
2010	**Usher**	
2010	Jaheim	
2010	Kem	
2010	Ne-Yo	
2011	**CeeLo Green**	
2011	Eric Benét	
2011	Chris Brown	
2011	R. Kelly	
2011	Trey Songz	
2012	**Miguel**	
2012	Trey Songz	
2012	Robin Thicke	
2012	Tyrese	
2012	Usher	
2013	**Miguel**	
2013	Chris Brown	
2013	John Legend	
2013	Bruno Mars	
2013	Robin Thicke	
2013	Charlie Wilson	
2014	**Trey Songz**	
2014	Chris Brown	
2014	Kem	
2014	John Legend	
2014	Tank	
2014	Pharrell Williams	
2015	**The Weeknd**	
2015	Chris Brown	
2015	D'Angelo and the Vanguard	
2015	Tyrese	
2015	Trey Songz	
2016	**Maxwell**	
2016	Anthony Hamilton	
2016	Bryson Tiller	
2016	The Weeknd	
2016	Usher	
2017	**Bruno Mars**	
2017	Bryson Tiller	
2017	Chris Brown	
2017	Khalid	
2017	The Weeknd	
2018	**Bruno Mars**	
2018	Childish Gambino	
2018	Daniel Caesar	
2018	John Legend	
2018	Khalid	
2018	Tank	
2019	**Khalid**	
2019	Anderson .Paak	
2019	Bruno Mars	
2019	Chris Brown	
2019	Daniel Caesar	
2019	Tank	

=== 2020s ===
Year	Artist	Ref
2020
2020	**Chris Brown**	
2020	Anderson .Paak	
2020	Charlie Wilson	
2020	PJ Morton	
2020	The Weeknd	
2020	Usher	
2021
2021	**Giveon**	
2021	Blxst	
2021	Chris Brown	
2021	Lucky Daye	
2021	Tank	
2021	Usher	
2022
2022	**Chris Brown**	
2022	Babyface	
2022	Brent Faiyaz	
2022	Burna Boy	
2022	Charlie Wilson	
2022	Giveon	
2022	Lucky Daye	
2022	PJ Morton	
2023
2023	**Usher**	
2023	6lack	
2023	Babyface	
2023	Brent Faiyaz	
2023	Burna Boy	
2023	Chris Brown	
2023	Eric Bellinger	
2023	October London	

== Multiple wins and nominations ==
=== Wins ===
2 wins

- Maxwell
- Trey Songz
- Miguel
- Bruno Mars
- Chris Brown
- Usher

=== Nominations ===
10 nominations

- Chris Brown

6 nominations

- Usher

5 nominations

- Trey Songz

4 nominations

- Charlie Wilson
- Bruno Mars
- Tank
- The Weeknd

3 nominations

- Robin Thicke
- John Legend
- Khalid

2 nominations

- Maxwell
- Kem
- Miguel
- Tyrese
- Bryson Tiller
- Daniel Caesar
- Anderson .Paak
- PJ Morton
- Giveon
- Lucky Daye
- Babyface
- Brent Faiyaz
- Burna Boy
