= Tanerélle =

American singer and model

- Born: Tanerélle Stephens; April 9, 1994 (age 31); Atlanta, Georgia, US
- Genres: R&B; Neo-soul; Afrofuturism
- Years active: 2015–present
- Labels: Republic Records (former)

Tanerélle Stephens (born April 9, 1994), known mononymously as Tanerélle, is an American singer, songwriter, and model.

== Early life ==
Stephens was born in Atlanta, Georgia. She was born to a single mother as the only child.

She grew up listening to artists like Ray Charles, Outkast, Ludacris, and Usher.

At the age of 18 she moved to Los Angeles and pursued a Bachelor of Fine Arts in acting.

== Career ==
Stephens released her first single Sirens in 2015. She went on to crowdfund her first EP called 11:11 through Kickstarter, which was released in 2017.

She supported singer Ari Lennox on an international tour in 2020. In the same year her single Nothing Without You was featured in Season 3 of the HBO television series Insecure.

In December 2020, Stephens modelled as a Playboy Playmate.

Stephens was a support act for the artist JoJo on the US leg of her tour in 2022.

Stephens co-composed the music for the film Nanny released in 2022. This received a nomination for Outstanding Original Score at the 2023 Black Reel Awards.

Stephens founded an independent record label called Mama Saturn Enterprises through which she released some of her music. In May 2024 it was announced that she had been signed by Republic Records.

== Personal life ==
Stephens is bisexual. She has a dog called Pluto.

== Discography ==
=== EPs ===
Title	Artist	Year	Label
11:11	Tanerélle	2017	Self-released
82 Moons	Tanerélle	2022	Mama Saturn Enterprises
Electric Honey	Tanerélle	2024	Republic Records
The Burnout	Tanerélle	2025	Mama Saturn Enterprises

=== Singles ===
2015:

- Siren

2017:

- Boys Like You

2018:

- In Women We Trust
- Dreamgirl
- HER
- Love from NGC 7318

2019:

- Won't
- Continuum
- Mama Saturn
- A Trip Through Space to Clear My Mind
- After the Beep

2020:

- Nothing Without You
- Star (A$AP Ferg Remix)

2021:

- Mama Saturn's Galactica
- Star (Shelley FKA DRAM Remix)
- Good Good
- No One Else

2022:

- SAMSARA
- Starseed

2023:

- Smear Campaign
- For Sport

2024:

- Better Days - A COLORS SHOW
- Better Days
- Let Me In
- I Wish
- For Her (Chemtrails) [feat. Machinedrum]

2025:

- Feels Like Love
