= Frequency of Love =

Studio album by Victoria Monét
- Released: October 2, 2026
- Genre: R&B
- Length: 63:49
- Labels: Lovett Music; RCA
- Producers: Aver Ray; BKAI; Michaël Brun; Camper; Robert Debose; D'Mile; Gitty; Kaytranada; Ben Parris; Spencer Stewart; Tricky Stewart; Tim Suby

Victoria Monét chronology
Jaguar II (2023)	Frequency of Love (2026)

Singles from Frequency of Love
- 1. "Let Me" Released: February 11, 2026; 2. "Reach Out" Released: July 22, 2026; 3. "Juicy" Released: September 10, 2026; 4. "See You in My Dreams" Released: October 5, 2026; 5. "That's Why I Love You" Released: October 15, 2026

Frequency of Love is the second studio album by the American singer-songwriter Victoria Monét. It was released through her imprint Lovett Music in contractual agreement with RCA Records on October 2, 2026.

The album was preceded by the release of the singles "Let Me," "Reach Out," and "Juicy."

== Background and composition ==
The Frequency of Love Tour was officially announced on September 10, 2026, through Monét's Instagram account. The announcement revealed a 27-date itinerary spanning October through December 2026. Live Nation was announced as tour operator.

On September 25, 2026, Monét unveiled the official track list for Frequency Of Love, with features from Leon Thomas, Lucky Daye, SZA, Bruno Mars, Bryson Tiller, Chlöe, and Monét’s daughter Hazel.

The album consists of twenty-two tracks written by the singer herself with numerous co-authors and producers, including close collaborators Camper, Tim Suby, and D'Mile, alongside Tricky Stewart, The-Dream, Jeff Gitelman, and Kaytranada, among others.

== Critical reception ==
Professional ratings
Review scores
Source	Rating
AllMusic	4/5
Euphoria Magazine	3.5/5
MusicOMH	4/5
NME	3.5/5
Paste	C+
Pitchfork	7/10
Shatter the Standards	4/5

Upon its release, Frequency of Love received generally favorable reviews. Writer Molly Mary O'Brien from Pitchfork called the album a "sprawling, meticulously polished new album [that] stretches out with swoony ballads, cinematic strings, and timeless quiet storm."

== Track listing ==
Frequency of Love track listing
No.	Title	Writer(s)	Producer(s)	Length
1.	"All I Need (Intro)"	Victoria Monét; Darhyl Camper; Billy Ray Schlag; Nickolas Ashford; Valerie Simpson	Camper; Aver Ray	2:03
2.	"Come Back to You"	Monét; Dernst Emile II; Ernie Isley; Marvin Isley; O'Kelly Isley Jr.; Ronald Isley; Rudolph Isley; Christopher Jasper	D'Mile	2:10
3.	"Care for Somebody (Interlude)"	Jack Brooks; Harry Warren	Camper; D'Mile	1:38
4.	"Say Dat"	Monét; Camper; Patrick Michaël Brun; Jahshua Brown; Terius Adamu Ya Gesteelde-Diamant; James Harris III; Terry Lewis	Camper; Michaël Brun^{[c]}; Cashmere Brown^{[c]}	3:04
5.	"Head to Toe"	Monét; Camper; Joe Thomas; Joshua Thompson; Michele Williams	Camper	4:20
6.	"Almost"	Monét; Camper; Emile; Tommy Parker; Shelly Peiken; Guy Roche	Camper; D'Mile	3:14
7.	"Juicy"	Monét; Emile; Daniel Church; Spencer Stewart; Brun; Kenneth Edmonds; Tommy Parker	D'Mile; Brun; S. Stewart; Camper^{[a]}; Ryan James Carr^{[a]}	3:06
8.	"Dark Side of the Moon (Interlude)"	Monét; Emile	D'Mile; Camper^{[a]}	0:37
9.	"You Mean the World to Me" (featuring Leon Thomas and Hazel Monét)	Monét; Robert Debose; Camper; Leon Thomas; Lazaro Camejo	Camper; Debose^{[a]}	3:24
10.	"Maybe" (featuring Lucky Daye)	Monét; David Brown; Jeff Gitelman; Debose; Sterling White Jr.	Camper; Debose^{[c]}; D'Mile^{[a]}	3:43
11.	"Money (Interlude)"	Monét; Debose; Tim Suby; Camper	Suby; Camper^{[a]}; Debose^{[a]}	1:26
12.	"You Hurt Me Too"	Monét; Camper; André Previn; Dory Previn	Camper	4:10
13.	"See You In My Dreams" (featuring SZA)	Monét; Solána Rowe; Gitelman; Branden Rowell; Suzanne Vega	Camper; Gitty; B Mack^{[c]}; Debose^{[a]}	2:38
14.	"That's Why I Love You" (featuring Bruno Mars)	Lauzi; Monét; Mars; Camper; Emile; Rowe	Camper; D'Mile; Debose	4:38
15.	"Single" (featuring Bryson Tiller)	Monét; Camper; Gitelman; Bryson Tiller; Theron Thomas	Camper; Gitty	3:09
16.	"Reach Out"	Monét; Parker; Emile; Louis Kevin Celestin; Ernest McFall; James Porter; Thomas Lumpkins	D'Mile; Kaytranada	2:39
17.	"I Want You"	Monét; Christopher Stewart; Ben Parris; Korey B. Roberson; Brian Gregory Thomas; Raphael Brown; Daryl Simmons; Ralph Stacy	Tricky Stewart; Parris; BKAI; B'nard^{[c]}; D'Mile^{[a]}	2:56
18.	"I Want You (Interlude)"	John Lennon; Paul McCartney	Camper	0:47
19.	"Lose Myself" (featuring Chlöe)	Monét; Camper; Debose; Chloe Bailey	Camper; Debose^{[c]}	3:36
20.	"Let Me"	Monét; Tiyon Mack; Rowell; J. Brown; Gitelman; Camper	Camper; Cashmere Brown^{[c]}; B Mack^{[c]}; Gitty^{[c]}	4:51
21.	"No Love Like Yours (Interlude)"	Monét; Debose; Camper	Camper; Debose^{[a]}	1:43
22.	"For You"	Kenny Lerum	Camper	3:45
Total length:				63:49

=== Notes ===
- ^{^[c]} indicates a co-producer
- ^{^[a]} indicates an additional producer

== Personnel ==
Credits are adapted from Tidal.

=== Musicians ===
- Victoria Monét – vocals (all tracks), arrangement (tracks 7, 16)
- Tommy Parker – background vocals (1, 2, 6, 7, 16), arrangement (16)
- D'Mile – bass (2, 3, 6, 17), drums (2, 3, 16), piano (2, 6, 7), programming (6, 16, 17), arrangement (7, 14, 16), keyboards (7, 16); background vocals, synth bass, synthesizer (7); electric guitar (17)
- Camper – synthesizer (2), piano (3), keyboards (6), programming (6), bass (8, 12), strings (11)
- Chris Payton – guitar (2)
- Dixson – background vocals (3, 9, 21), arrangement (9)
- Tiyon "TC" Mack – background vocals (6, 20)
- Sherie Farris – arrangement, background vocals, strings (7)
- Michaël Brun – drums, keyboards, synthesizer (7)
- Daniel Church – background vocals (7)
- Spencer Stewart – bass (7)
- Austin Brown – background vocals (8, 16)
- Robert Debose – bass (9–12, 21)
- Leon Thomas – vocals (9)
- Hazel Monét – vocals (9)
- Jeff "Gitty" Gitelman – electric guitar (10, 20), acoustic guitar (20)
- Lucky Daye – vocals (10)
- Morning Estrada – programming (11)
- SZA – vocals (13)
- Bruno Mars – vocals, arrangement (14)
- Larry Gold – arrangement (14)
- Peter Lee Johnson – arrangement (14)
- Bryson Tiller – vocals (15)
- Kaytranada – programming (16)
- B'nard – programming (17)
- Ben Parris – programming (17)
- Tricky Stewart – programming (17)
- Chlöe – vocals (19)
- Bene Johnson – background vocals (21)
- Cherise Thomas – background vocals (21)
- Fatima Johnson-Abbey – background vocals (21)
- L'Tanya Cubit – background vocals (21)
- LaMarcus Eldridge – background vocals (21)
- Taelor Murphy – background vocals (21)
- Tayler Green – background vocals (21)

=== Technical ===
- Luca Zadra – engineering
- Victoria Monét – engineering (1–14, 16–19, 21, 22), executive production
- Jenso "JP" Plymouth engineering (1–7, 12, 13, 16)
- Gary Bannister – engineering (10)
- Noe Corona – engineering (14, 19), additional engineering (7)
- Ben Parris – engineering (17)
- Richard Ledesma – engineering (17)
- Morning Estrada – engineering (19)
- Aalycia Dorsey – engineering assistance (17)
- Manny Marroquin – mixing
- Zach Pereya – mastering
- Camper – executive production

== Charts ==
Chart performance for Frequency of Love
Chart (2026)	Peak position
UK Album Downloads (Official Charts)	34
UK R&B Albums (Official Charts)	5
US Billboard 200	49
US Top R&B/Hip-Hop Albums (Billboard)	13
