= Victoria Monét =

American singer-songwriter (born 1989)

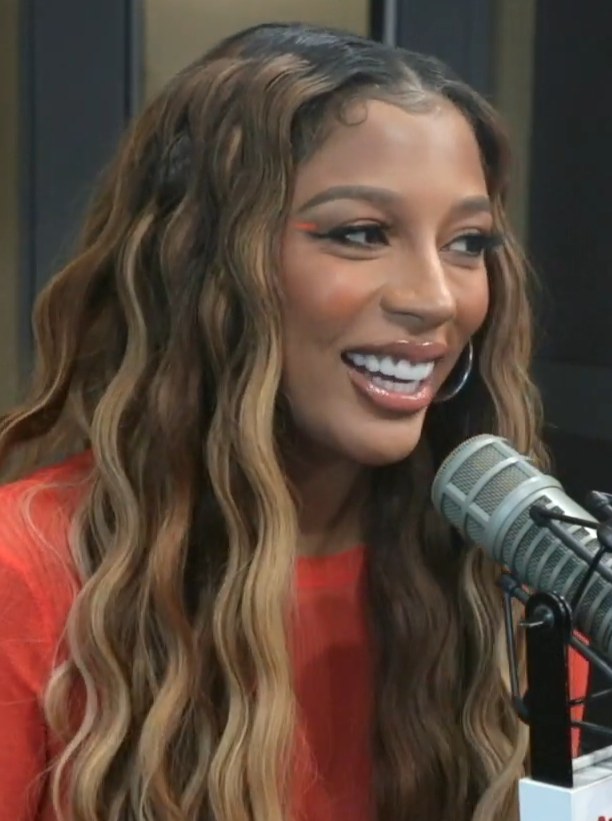
- Monét in 2023

Background information
- Born: Victoria Monét McCants; May 1, 1989 (age 37); Atlanta, Georgia, U.S.
- Origin: Sacramento, California, U.S.
- Genres: R&B; pop; soul
- Occupation: Singer-songwriter
- Years active: 2010–present
- Labels: Atlantic; RCA
- Partner: John Gaines (2020–2023)
- Children: 1
- Website: victoriamonet.co

Victoria Monét McCants (born May 1, 1989) is an American singer-songwriter. First gaining recognition for her songwriting work, Monét pursued a recording career with the release of a series of extended plays (EPs); her fifth, Jaguar (2020) was met with critical acclaim. Her debut studio album, Jaguar II (2023), became her commercial breakthrough and was supported by the hit single "On My Mama", which peaked within the top 40 of the Billboard Hot 100 and earned a Grammy Award nomination for Record of the Year. The nomination was among seven she received at the 66th Annual Grammy Awards, from which she won Best New Artist, Best R&B Album and Best Engineered Album, Non-Classical.

She became involved in the performing arts at a young age, and embarked on a musical career in 2010. After performing as part of a short-lived girl group formed by record producer Rodney Jerkins, she took to songwriting and began doing so in tandem with Jerkins and his associate, D'Mile. Monét became a frequent collaborator of singer Ariana Grande, having co-written songs for each of her studio albums from her debut Yours Truly (2013) up to her sixth, Positions (2020). In 2019, Monét received three Grammy Award nominations (including Album of the Year) for her work on Grande's Thank U, Next. That same year, Grande and Monét released the single "Monopoly", which became a top 40 hit on the UK Singles Chart.

Throughout her career, Monét has worked on songs and albums for other high-profile acts including Nas, Travis Scott, Blackpink, Fifth Harmony, T.I., Lupe Fiasco, Chrisette Michele, Brandy, Coco Jones, Chloe x Halle and Chris Brown. Her accolades include two Soul Train Music Awards, three Grammy Awards, and the Rising Star Award from Billboard Women In Music.

== Early life ==
Monét was born in Atlanta, Georgia, on May 1, 1989, and moved to Sacramento as a teen when her parents relocated for work. In Catholic elementary school, she appeared on stage in holiday plays, and in church she sang in the youth choir. In junior high school, she formed her own dance group; this led to teaching at two dance studios. She attended Sheldon High School in Sacramento after pleading with her mother to change their address so that she could participate in Sheldon's performing arts program.

== Career ==
Outside of dance rehearsals, Monét began exchanging poetry with an older cousin and found a new passion. This soon translated into her writing her own music. A Sacramento-based producer who she had been working with educated her on the production world and learning about producers while making music at a local recording studio together. Through this experience she learned about Rodney Jerkins and added him on Myspace. Shortly afterwards, he invited her to come to Los Angeles and audition for a new girl group he was forming, Purple Reign. The group landed a record deal with Motown a year later, but was dropped before releasing any music. After the group's disbandment, Monét turned to songwriting to earn money while she waited for her own music career to build up. The first song she worked on was a track for Diddy Dirty Money's 2010 album, Last Train to Paris. She continued to write song hooks and sang the demos herself before sending them out. Her hope was that the labels would like her version enough that they would keep her on the track as a feature.

Atlantic Records CEO Craig Kallman heard one of her demos in a meeting and offered her a record deal later that day. Even though she was signed, Monét acknowledged that her songwriting "took off" before her music, while she was working on both. Her songwriting remained her main form of income during the beginning of her music career.

=== 2014–2018: Nightmares & Lullabies and Life After Love ===
On October 30, 2014, Monét released her debut EP Nightmares & Lullabies: Act 1 and on June 17, 2015, she released her follow-up EP Nightmares & Lullabies – Act 2 under Atlantic Records. Monét chose the name as it represented the sound of the EPs: a dark beat mixed with soft melodies.

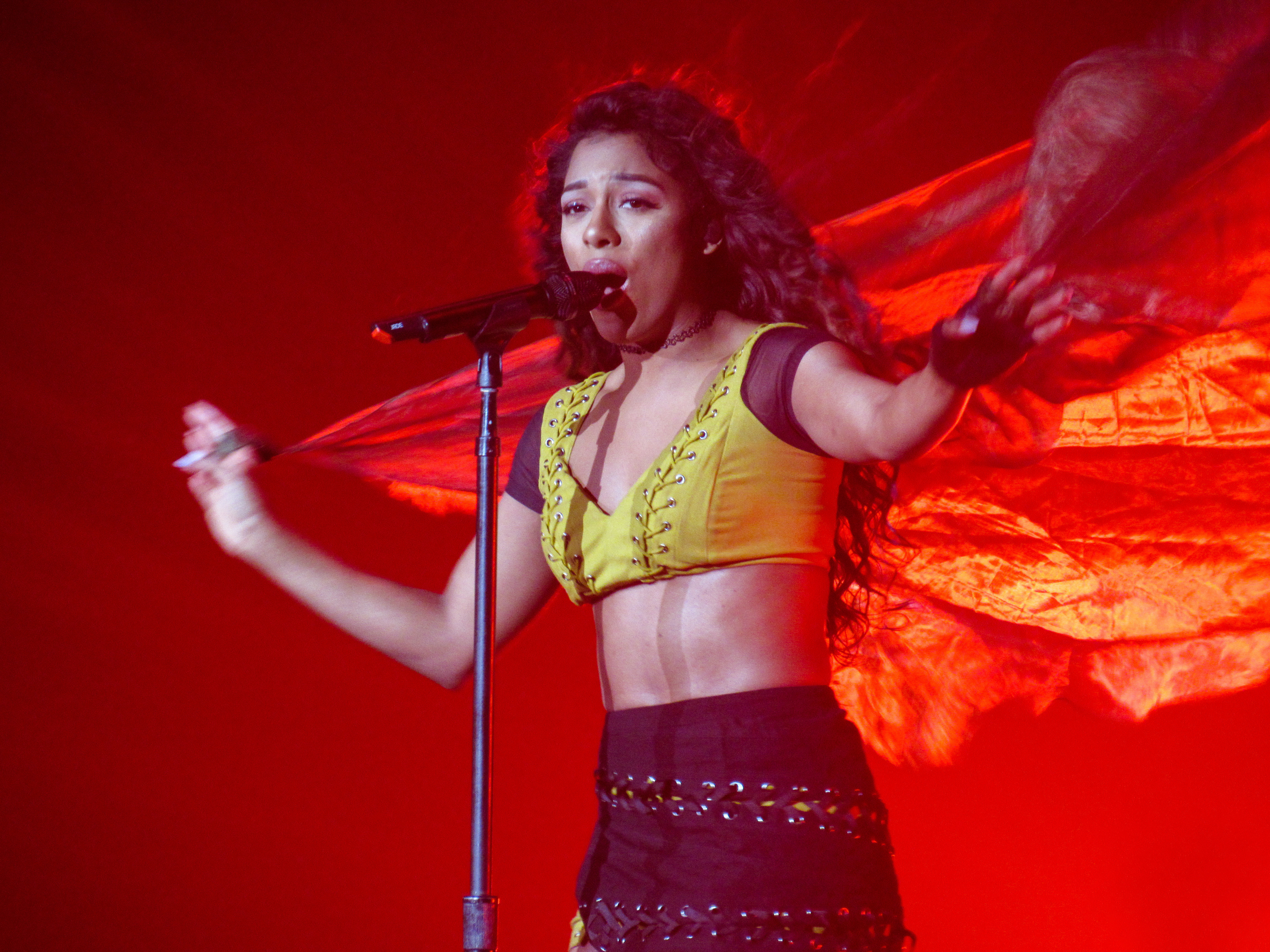
Monet performing in 2017

Following the shootings of 2016- Alton Sterling and Philando Castile, as well as the Dallas Police shooting, Monét released "Better Days" with Ariana Grande on July 10, 2016. Monét joined girl group Fifth Harmony on the North American leg of the 7/27 Tour, which began on July 25, 2016, as an opening act along with pop singer JoJo. Grande joined Monét on one of the tour dates to perform "Better Days". On September 22, 2016, Grande announced on Twitter that Monét will serve as an opening act along with British girl group Little Mix on the North American leg of the Dangerous Woman Tour. Monét also supported Grande on the European leg of the tour alongside rapper Bia.

In 2016, Monét released the promotional single "Do You Like It" which was followed by the single "Ready", which was released while on tour with Ariana Grande in April 2017. Both singles would later be included on Life After Love Pt. 2. On February 23, 2018, Monét released the first half of her "Life After Love" series, Life After Love, Pt. 1. The project features the single "Freak", which was released on February 9 with the project's pre-order. A remix of the song featuring previous tour-mate Bia, was released on July 19, 2018, alongside a music video. The latter half of the "Life After Love" series, Life After Love, Pt. 2, was released on September 28, 2018, and was preceded by the single "New Love".

=== 2019–present: Jaguar and Jaguar II ===
On April 1, 2019, Victoria Monét and Ariana Grande released the single "Monopoly" while Grande was on her Sweetener World Tour. The song debuted at No. 70 on the Billboard Hot 100 becoming Monét first entry on the chart as an artist; Monét also appeared at No. 16 on Billboard's Emerging Artists artist the same week.

In late 2019, Monét released the single "Ass Like That". The song served as the lead single to her upcoming debut project. In early 2020, Monét released the single "Moment" followed by the promotional single "Dive". Monét was announced as Apple Music's Up Next artist in February 2020. On June 19, Monét released the single "Experience" with Khalid and SG Lewis and announced her debut project, Jaguar. In an interview with Apple Music, Monét disclosed that Jaguar will be released in three separate parts which will eventually come together to form her debut studio album. Part one of Jaguar was released on August 7. On October 4, Monét released the song "Politics" exclusively on SoundCloud, leaving a portion of the song fully instrumental, so listeners could add their own feature verse to the song. On October 8, Monét released a remix of the Jaguar track "Touch Me" featuring American singer-songwriter Kehlani. In December 2020, Monét released a holiday instrumental edition of Jaguar called A Jaguar Christmas: The Orchestral Arrangements.

On February 1, 2021, Monét released the single "F.U.C.K." along with a western-themed music video. On August 5, 2021, she released another single "Coastin" and a music video was released starring Rickey Thompson. In June 2022, Monét performed "Coastin" at the 22nd BET Awards pre-show and announced she was working on a follow-up project to her previous EP titled Jaguar II.

On March 24, 2023, Monét released the track "Smoke" featuring Lucky Daye, as her first new single since 2021. "Smoke" was followed by the singles "Party Girls" (featuring Buju Banton) and "On My Mama", released on May 10 and June 16, respectively. A dancehall remix of "Party Girls" (additionally featuring Michaël Brun) was released on May 26. In July 2023, Monét was featured on the cover of the 125th edition of Clash.

In January 2024, Monét and the Black Music Action Coalition (BMAC) partnered to establish the "BMAC x Victoria Monét Music Maker Grant" that provides a $5,000 grant, as well as mentorship and career advice from Monét, to support select emerging Black artists.

== Songwriting ==
Monét has a long history of writing songs for other artists. In 2010, she helped pen "I Hate That You Love Me" by Diddy Dirty Money and went on to co-write songs such as "Be Alright", "Let Me Love You", "Thank U, Next", and "Monopoly" (featuring Monét) by Ariana Grande; "Memories Back Then" by T.I., B.o.B and Kendrick Lamar; "Drunk Texting" by Chris Brown; "Everlasting Love", "Them Girls Be Like", "Reflection", "We Know", and "No Way" by Fifth Harmony; "You Wouldn't Understand" by Nas; "Sin City" by GOOD Music; "Visual Love" by Chrisette Michele; "Live on Tonight" by T.I.; "Do It" by Chloe x Halle; "Rather Be" by Brandy; as well as "Ice Cream" by Blackpink and Selena Gomez.

For her work with Grande she was nominated for two awards at the 62nd Annual Grammy Awards, Record of the Year for "7 Rings" and Album of the Year for Thank U, Next. The following year she was nominated in the Best R&B Song category for co-writing Chloe x Halle's single "Do It".

== Artistry ==
=== Influences ===
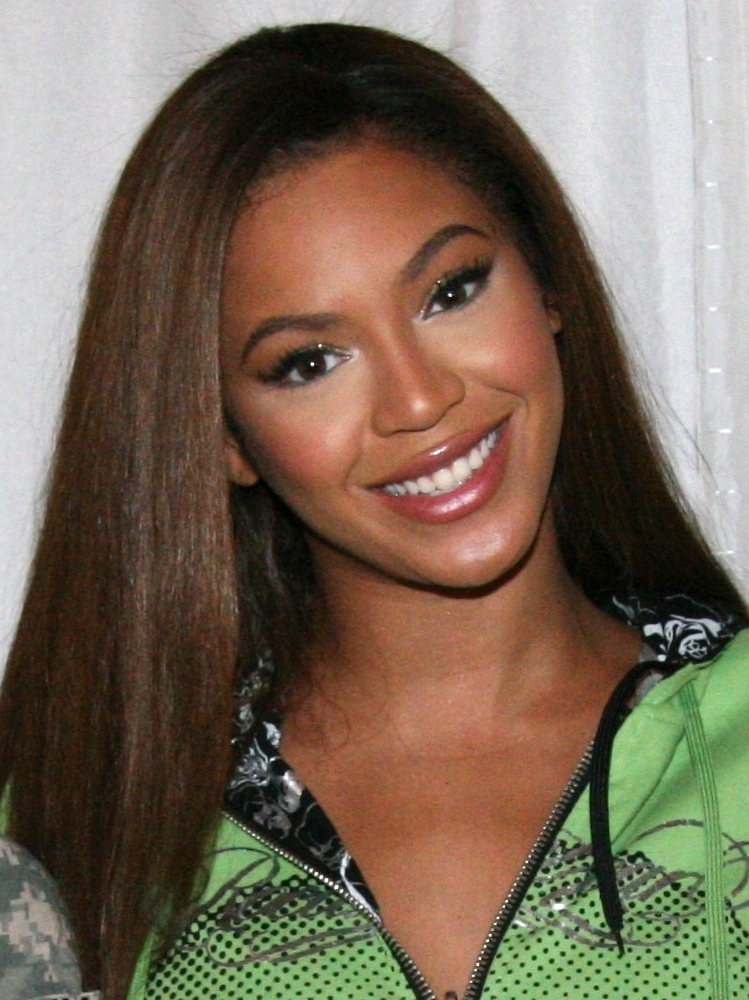
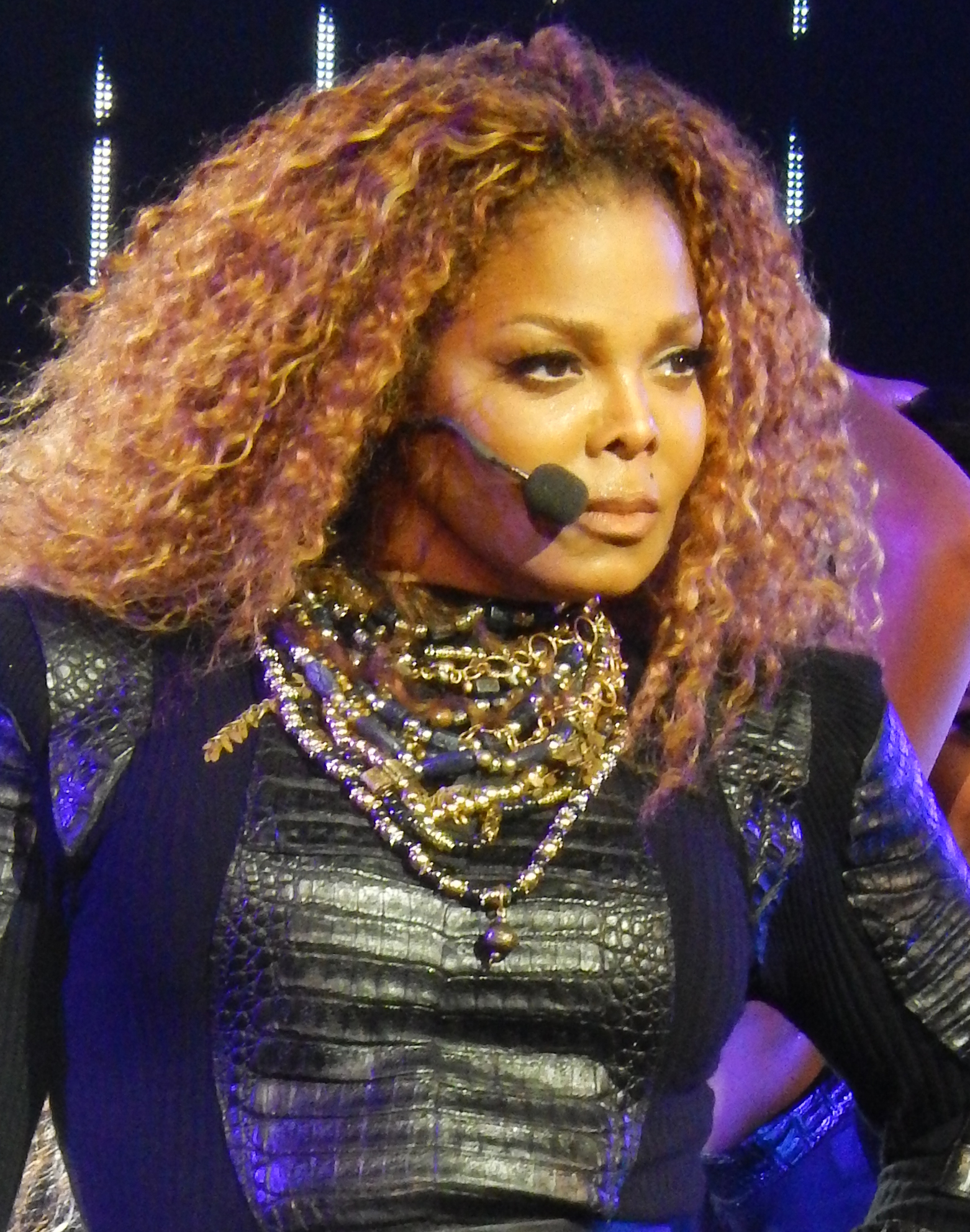
Monét's major influences include Beyoncé (left) and Janet Jackson (right).

Monet has been described mainly as an R&B and soul artist with pop influences. She has also had numerous influences of hip-hop in her music as well. Monét has frequently cited R&B/pop female artists such as Aaliyah, Janet Jackson, Destiny's Child, Beyoncé, Mariah Carey, Brandy, and Alicia Keys as major musical and vocal influences. She also cited pop influence from Michael Jackson and Coldplay, while soul and jazz from Earth, Wind & Fire and Sade. From her childhood she took influences from reggae listening to Bob Marley and Buju Banton. Monét mentioned The-Dream, Ne-Yo and Smokey Robinson as an inspiration for "having both a successful songwriting career and a successful artist career". She referred to Beyoncé's Lemonade and Kanye West's My Beautiful Dark Twisted Fantasy as inspirations for her works for visual album.

== Personal life ==
Monét came out as bisexual in 2018.

In December 2020, she announced that she and her boyfriend John Gaines were expecting their first child. On February 21, 2021, Monét gave birth to a daughter, Hazel Monét. Monét announced on social media that she and Gaines had broken up in 2023. In 2024, at the age of three, their daughter became the youngest Grammy Awards nominee in history for her laughter on Monét’s song "Hollywood", nominated for Best Traditional R&B Performance at the 66th Annual Grammy Awards.

== Discography ==
- Jaguar II (2023)
- Frequency of Love (2026)

== Tours ==
Headlining

- The Jaguar Tour (2023)
- Frequency of Love Tour (2026)

Supporting

- Fifth Harmony – 7/27 Tour (2016)
- Ariana Grande – Dangerous Woman Tour (2017)
- Bruno Mars – The Romantic Tour (2026)

== Awards and nominations ==
Year	Organization	Award	Work	Result	Ref.
2020	Soul Train Music Awards	Best New Artist	Herself	Nominated	
2020	Grammy Awards	Album of the Year	Thank U, Next	Nominated	
2020	Grammy Awards	Record of the Year	"7 Rings"	Nominated	
2021	Grammy Awards	Best R&B Song	"Do It"	Nominated	
2021	GLAAD Media Awards	Outstanding Breakthrough Music Artist	Jaguar	Nominated	
2022	Give Her FlowHERS Awards	The Visionary Award	Herself	Won	
2023	Soul Train Music Awards	Best R&B/Soul Female Artist	Herself	Nominated	
2023	Soul Train Music Awards	Album of the Year	Jaguar II	Nominated	
2023	Soul Train Music Awards	Song of the Year	"On My Mama"	Nominated	
2023	Soul Train Music Awards	The Ashford & Simpson Songwriter's Award	"On My Mama"	Nominated	
2023	Soul Train Music Awards	Best Dance Performance	"On My Mama"	Won	
2023	Soul Train Music Awards	Video of the Year	"On My Mama"	Won	
2024	Grammy Awards	Record of the Year	"On My Mama"	Nominated	
2024	Grammy Awards	Best R&B Song	"On My Mama"	Nominated	
2024	Grammy Awards	Best New Artist	Herself	Won	
2024	Grammy Awards	Best R&B Performance	"How Does It Make You Feel"	Nominated	
2024	Grammy Awards	Best Traditional R&B Performance	"Hollywood" (with Earth, Wind & Fire & Hazel Monét)	Nominated	
2024	Grammy Awards	Best R&B Album	Jaguar II	Won	
2024	Grammy Awards	Best Engineered Album, Non-Classical	Jaguar II	Won	
2024	NAACP Image Awards	Outstanding New Artist	Herself	Won	
2024	NAACP Image Awards	Outstanding Female Artist	Herself	Nominated	
2024	NAACP Image Awards	Outstanding Album	Jaguar II	Won	
2024	NAACP Image Awards	Outstanding Duo, Group or Collaboration (Contemporary)	"Smoke" (with Lucky Daye)	Nominated	
2024	NAACP Image Awards	Outstanding Soul/R&B Song	"On My Mama"	Nominated	
2024	NAACP Image Awards	Outstanding Music Video/Visual Album	"On My Mama"	Nominated	
2024	MTV Video Music Awards	Best R&B	"On My Mama"	Nominated	
2024	MTV Video Music Awards	Push Performance of The Year	"On My Mama"	Nominated	
2024	People's Choice Awards	The R&B Artist of the Year	Herself	Nominated	
2024	iHeartRadio Music Awards	Best New R&B Artist	Herself	Won	
2024	iHeartRadio Music Awards	R&B Song of the Year	"On My Mama"	Nominated	
2024	Billboard Women in Music	Rising Star Award	Herself	Honoree	
2024	BET Awards	Best Female R&B/Pop Artist	Herself	Nominated	
2024	BET Awards	Album of the Year	Jaguar II	Nominated	
2024	BET Awards	Video of the Year	"On My Mama"	Won	
2024	BET Awards	Viewer's Choice Award	"On My Mama"	Nominated	
2024	BET Awards	BET Her Award	"On My Mama"	Won	
2025	Berlin Music Video Awards	Best Cinematography	"On My Mama"	Nominated	
2027	Grammy Awards	Best R&B Solo Performance	"Let Me"	Pending	
2027	Grammy Awards	Best R&B Song	"Let Me"	Pending	
