= Jaguar II (album) =

2023 studio album by Victoria Monét

Studio album by Victoria Monét
- Released: August 25, 2023
- Recorded: 2020–2022
- Genre: R&B
- Length: 35:31
- Labels: Lovett Music; RCA
- Producers: D'Mile; Deputy; Dready; Jeff Gitelman; Kaytranada; Tim Suby; xSDTRK; Yogi

Victoria Monét chronology
Jaguar (2020)	Jaguar II (2023)	Frequency of Love (2026)

Singles from Jaguar II
- 1. "Smoke" Released: March 24, 2023; 2. "Party Girls" Released: May 10, 2023; 3. "On My Mama" Released: June 16, 2023; 4. "Alright" Released: June 14, 2024

Deluxe edition cover

Singles from Jaguar II : Deluxe
- 1. "SOS (Sex on Sight)" Released: August 27, 2024

Jaguar II is the debut studio album by American R&B singer-songwriter Victoria Monét, and her first major label release. It was released on August 25, 2023, through Lovett Music and RCA Records. The album was supported by four singles: "Smoke" with Lucky Daye, "Party Girls" with Buju Banton, "On My Mama", and "Alright".

The second and final installment of Monét's Jaguar series, she originally intended the Jaguar series to be a trilogy of EPs around the release of the first Jaguar installment. They would have eventually come together to form her debut studio album. However, due to Jaguar II being delayed further than expected, the series was eventually reduced to only two projects. In support of both Jaguar and Jaguar II, Monét embarked on The Jaguar Tour.

At the 66th Grammy Awards, the album won Best R&B Album and Best Engineered Album, Non-Classical.

== Background ==
In February 2021, after the release of the Jaguar EP, Monét released the single "F.U.C.K", along with a western-themed music video. Around the same time, she would also give birth to her daughter Hazel Monét Gaines. Later that year, the single "Coastin'" was released, along with an accompanying music video featuring Rickey Thompson. In June 2022, Monét performed "Coastin" at the 22nd BET Awards pre-show and announced she was working on the second installment to her planned Jaguar trilogy, titled Jaguar II.

== Singles ==
On March 24, 2023, Monét released the album's lead single "Smoke" (featuring Lucky Daye), which was also her first new single since 2021.

This was then followed by the album's second single, "Party Girls" (featuring Buju Banton), on May 10. A dancehall remix of "Party Girls", remixed by Michaël Brun was released on May 26.

Following the second single, the album's third, "On My Mama", was released on June 16, 2023, while its music video was released August 15, 2023.

The singer released "Alright" as the album's fourth single on June 14, 2024, almost a year after the release of "On My Mama". Its music video was released on June 11, 2024.

== Critical reception ==
Professional ratings
Aggregate scores
Source	Rating
AnyDecentMusic?	7.7/10
Metacritic	87/100
Review scores
Source	Rating
AllMusic	4.5/5 stars
Clash	8/10
Financial Times	4/5 stars
Pitchfork	8.0/10
Rolling Stone	4/5 stars
HotNewHipHop	4.5/5 stars

Jaguar II received critical acclaim from contemporary music critics. At Metacritic, a website that aggregates reviews of music albums, which assigns a normalized rating out of 100 to reviews from mainstream publications, the album received an average score of 87, based on 8 reviews, indicating "universal acclaim".

AllMusic's Andy Kellman wrote that it "nudges contemporary R&B forward as it mixes inspirations spanning continents and generations" and "Monét always comes across as an everywoman at heart, no matter how fantastical or personal she gets, followed closely by her ability to sound authoritative without increasing the volume or toughness of her dulcet voice". Shahzaib Hussain of Clash felt that Jaguar II "preserves an almost anti-algorithmic approach in sound; it draws on musical touchstones but is a poetically a modern enterprise", also calling it "a compressed listen with only 11 tracks but still packs in dimensionality and texture". Pitchfork's Anna Gaca found that its "plush R&B and live-band arrangements strike a tone that's classic, sexy, and understated", describing it as "the rare species of pop-soul that evokes a real sense of spiritual uplift". In a rave review, HotNewHipHop's Demi Phillips referred to the album as "a testament to the singer affirming her musical self-discovery," also labeling it "a glittery R&B delicacy that awakens every human sense."

== Accolades ==
Awards and nominations for Jaguar II
Organization	Year	Category	Result	Ref.
Soul Train Music Awards	2023	Album of the Year	Nominated	
Grammy Awards	2024	Best Engineered Album, Non-Classical	Won	
Grammy Awards	2024	Best R&B Album	Won	
NAACP Image Awards	2024	Outstanding Album	Won	

=== Year-end lists ===
Critics' rankings for Jaguar II
Publication	Accolade	Rank	Ref.
Rolling Stone	The 100 Best Albums of 2023	9	
Billboard	The 50 Best Albums of 2023: Staff List	5	
Los Angeles Times	The 20 best albums of 2023	11	
The Ringer	The 27 Best Albums of 2023	18	

== Track listing ==
Jaguar II track listing
No.	Title	Lyrics	Music	Producer(s)	Length
1.	"Smoke" (featuring Lucky Daye)	Victoria Monét; David Brown	Dernst Emile II; Timothy Murdock Suby; Yogesh Tulsani; Maurice White	D'Mile; Tim Suby; Yogi	3:07
2.	"Smoke (Reprise)"	Monét	Monét; Emile	D'Mile	1:37
3.	"Party Girls" (featuring Buju Banton)	Monét; Mark Myrie; Theron Thomas	Yonatan Ayal; Karl Daniel; Emile; Tommy Lumpkins; Elena Pinderhughes	D'Mile; Dready; xSDTRK	4:01
4.	"Alright"	Monét	Monét; Louis Kevin Celestin	Kaytranada	2:53
5.	"Cadillac (A Pimp's Anthem)"	Monét	Emile; Trav Simmons; Suby; Pinderhughes	D'Mile; Suby	3:02
6.	"How Does It Make You Feel"	Monét	Monét; Emile	D'Mile	3:36
7.	"On My Mama"	Monét; Charles Williams	Emile; Jeff Gitelman; Kyla Moscovich; Jamil Pierre	Deputy; Gitelman; D'Mile	3:04
8.	"I'm the One"	Monét	Monét; Emile; Suby	D'Mile; Suby	3:29
9.	"Stop (Askin' Me 4Shyt)"	Monét; James Fauntleroy	Emile; Ayal; Suby	D'Mile; Suby; xSDTRK	2:51
10.	"Hollywood" (featuring Earth, Wind & Fire and Hazel Monét)	Monét	Hazel Monét Gaines; Emile; Suby	D'Mile; Suby	3:37
11.	"Good Bye"	Monét	Monét; Emile	D'Mile	4:10
Total length:					35:31

Deluxe edition
No.	Title	Lyrics	Music	Producer(s)	Length
12.	"DickAtNight"	Monét	D'Mile; Darhyl Camper	D'Mile; DJ Camper	2:59
13.	"Don't Sleep" (featuring Thundercat)	Monét	D'Mile; Suby; Stephen Bruner	D'Mile; Suby; Bruner	3:49
14.	"SOS (Sex on Sight)" (with Usher)	Monét; Camper; Usher Raymond IV; Daniel Church; Ido Zmishlany; Anthony Clemons Jr.	Camper	Camper	4:22
15.	"2Sexy" (Interlude)	Monét	Camper; Atal	Camper; xSDTRK	1:22
16.	"1900's"	Monét; Emile; Ayal; Michael Jackson; Gary Glenn; Dianne Quander	D'Mile; xSDTRK	D'Mile; xSDTRK	2:29
17.	"Love Is Stronger than Pride"	Sade Adu; Andrew Hale	D'Mile	D'Mile	4:10
18.	"Everybody Needs Someone"	Monét	Camper; Clemons; Tommy Parker; Justus West	Camper; Clemons; Parker; West	3:23
19.	"We Might Even Be Falling in Love" (Duet; with Bryson Tiller)	Monét; Emile	D'Mile	D'Mile	1:30
20.	"The Greatest"	Monét	D'Mile	D'Mile	3:32
21.	"The Greatest" (Lovenotes Outro)	Monét	D'Mile	D'Mile	4:57
Total length:					68:04

== Personnel ==
Musicians

- Victoria Monét – vocals (all tracks)
- Lucky Daye - vocals (1)
- Buju Banton - vocals (3)
- Arnetta Johnson – trumpet (tracks 1, 11)
- Elena Pinderhughes – flute (5, 6)
- Kyla Moscovich – horns (5, 7), background vocals (10), trumpet (11)
- Marcus Reddick – bass (6)
- Carlin White – drums (6)
- Peter Lee Johnson – strings (6, 7, 10, 11)
- Verdine White – bass (10)
- Tommy Parker – background vocals (11)
- Chris Payton – guitar (11)

Technical

- Colin Leonard – mastering
- John Kercy – mixing (1–3, 6, 8–11), engineering (3)
- Neal H Pogue – mixing (4, 5)
- Patrizio "Teezio" Pigliapoco – mixing (7)
- Todd Robinson – engineering (5–11)
- Kyle Mann – engineering (1–3, 5,6, 8–11)

== Charts ==
Chart performance for Jaguar II
Chart (2023)	Peak position
UK Album Downloads (Official Charts)	57
US Billboard 200	60
US Top R&B/Hip-Hop Albums (Billboard)	22
