= Experience (Victoria Monét, Khalid and SG Lewis song) =

2020 single by Victoria Monét, Khalid and SG Lewis

Single by Victoria Monét, Khalid and SG Lewis

from the EP Jaguar
- Released: June 19, 2020
- Recorded: 2020
- Studio: Republic Records Studios (Los Angeles, California)
- Genre: Disco; house; synth-pop
- Length: 2:56
- Label: Tribe Records
- Songwriters: Victoria Monét; Khalid Robinson; Samuel George Lewis; Kyla Moscovich
- Producer: SG Lewis

Victoria Monét singles chronology
"Moment" (2020)	"Experience" (2020)	"Touch Me (Remix)" (2020)

Khalid singles chronology
"Know Your Worth" (2020)	"Experience" (2020)	"Be Like That" (2020)

SG Lewis singles chronology
"Chemicals" (2020)	"Experience" (2020)	"Impact" (2020)

"Experience" is a song recorded by American singers Victoria Monét and Khalid and British record producer SG Lewis. It was released as the third single from the former's fifth extended play Jaguar on June 19, 2020 through Tribe Records. It is a disco breakup song written by all three artists with Kyla Moscovich and produced by Moscovich and Lewis.

== Background ==
A collaboration between Monét and Khalid was first teased a week before the release of "Experience" in a tweet by Khalid which tagged Monét and read, "can't wait." On June 16, 2020, in a statement written by Monét posted to both her and Khalid's Instagram accounts, they announced that their then untitled song would be released on June 19. In the joint statement, they explained that, despite going "back and forth" about it due to the "disgusting and confusing state of the world", they were releasing the song in the midst of the George Floyd protests as a "form of escapism from troubling things", writing, "It’s important to us to highlight and celebrate Black joy and love in the middle of so much pain and trauma."

== Composition ==
"Experience"
A 22-second sample of the chorus of "Experience", featuring Monét and Khalid singing over drums, synthesizers, and horns.

"Experience" is a "retro" disco song, written as a duet, which incorporates electro-funk, pop, and R&B influences, and features drums, synthesizers, and trumpets played by Kyla Moscovich. The song begins with a verse and chorus from Monét, while the second verse is sung by Khalid, with both singing together in the song's latter half. In the song's lyrics, Monét and Khalid express their hopes that an unfaithful ex-lover has grown from experience post-breakup. The song was called a "chugging groove" by The Guardian's Alim Kheraj, who remarked that it was "indebted" to Off the Wall-era Quincy Jones, and that the production by SG Lewis was "plush". Rap-Up also noted that the song had a "pulsating groove", while Wongo Okon of Uproxx referred to the song as "upbeat and groovy".

== Critical reception ==
Robin Murray of Clash called "Experience" "a stunning party-starting favourite that blasts apart the rigours of the lockdown process" and "sheer joy from start to finish". The Independent's Brittny Pierre referred to the track as a "shiny mirrorball of a collaboration". Dani Blum of Pitchfork praised Monét's performance on the song, writing that she "makes the song a celebration" and "claim[s] the spotlight, dazzling and dancing all the way", while calling Khalid's performance on the song "palatable" and "anonymous-sounding". Blum added that "Like the rest of [Jaguar], the track functions as both a triumph and a declaration." Kheraj of The Guardian noted that the song "brush[ed] up against 2020's appetite for disco nostalgia", calling Lewis's vocal production of the song "a bold, beautiful choice".

== Music video ==
A lyric video for "Experience" was released on June 30, 2020.
