= Chalie Boy =

American recording artist

- Born: Charles Williams; October 13, 1979 (age 47)
- Origin: Robertson County, Texas, United States
- Genres: Hip hop, R&B
- Occupations: Rapper, songwriter
- Years active: 2000–present
- Labels: Battery Records, Jive Records, Dirty 3rd Records
- Website: Chalie Boy's Official Website

Charles Williams (born October 13, 1979), better known by his stage name Chalie Boy, is an American hip hop recording artist, who made his major-label debut in 2009 with the breakout hit single "I Look Good." In 2010, Chalie Boy made headlines with his 100+ lb. weight loss as he debuted the video "Deja Blu."

== Early life ==
Born in the vicinity of Calvert, Texas (the hometown of his father) and Hearne, Texas (the hometown of his mother), two small cities in Robertson County, Charles began singing in his church choir at the age of three. He was heavily influenced by artists that fused hip-hop and R&B, like UGK, Run-D.M.C., Nate Dogg, Screwed Up Click member Big Moe, Scarface, Luther Vandross, Michael Jackson, Gerald Levert and Grandmaster Flash & the Furious Five, as well as blues legends Bobby "Blue" Bland, B.B. King, and Johnnie Taylor.

== Music career ==
=== 2000–2004: The Freestyle Kingz / Chalie Boy and Tite ===
In 2000, Charles made his rapping debut, being featured on a mixtape for Texas underground group known as the Freestyle Kingz, performing under DJ Bull's independent record label Dirty 3rd Records. From this point on, Charles Williams performed under the name Chalie Boy.

The members of the Freestyle Kingz included Tite, Da Ryno, Big Redd, Big Ake, Lil' Sho, Sir Coop and Bubba Luv. The group became very popular in the Texas underground scene, including a few other southern states. The group released around 30 underground titles, including the group's only studio album in 2002 titled Off Tha Chain. The album featured production by now platinum producers Carnival Beats. This album sold over 40,000 copies independently, and featured the single Candy (featuring Slim Thug). Other popular songs from the album included 20's, Uh Oh and A King.

Chalie Boy & Tite became a popular duo. They always remained and were recognized as members of the Freestyle Kingz, but they also released 4 projects together under the same label. Promotion was seen on flyers, posters and CD artwork about an upcoming album featuring the duo titled Long Time Comin, but the title was never released.

Members of the group began to leave for different reasons. The only members that remain with the label today are Da Ryno and Chalie Boy. The group name is occasionally referenced in the recordings of the two members, but officially, the Freestyle Kingz is no longer a group.

=== 2004–2008: The Versatyle Child ===
In 2004, Chalie Boy released his first solo mixtape titled Makin’ My Way, which sold over 20,000 copies. A year later, a collection of original and mixtape records were released as Chalie Boy's Greatest Hits. The success of this release spawned three more volumes over the next four years that have become equally popular.

In 2005, Austin, TX. DJ, Rapid Ric invited Chalie Boy into a group Rapid Ric put together known as The Whut It Dew Family, a name based on Rapid Ric's popular mixtape series Whut It Dew. The group also consisted of members Magno, Mr. Blakes, Black Mike, Gerald G, and fellow Dirty 3rd Records label mate, Da Ryno. Rapid Ric featured the group in different variations throughout his mixtape releases.

In 2006, DJ Rapid Ric and Chalie Boy collaborated to release The Versatyle Child, which included his first regional hit, Bumpa Grill. This mixtape exposed Chalie Boy to an even wider audience because of Rapid Ric's popularity and success as a club and mixtape DJ. The two continued to work together, including a follow-up release titled The Return of The Versatyle Child.

During the years of 2007 and 2008, Chalie Boy began to release even more underground releases, while recording material for his debut solo studio album titled Makin' My Way 2.

=== 2009–present: Record deal ===
In January 2009, Dirty 3rd Records released Chalie Boy's newest single titled "I Look Good". This single became a big hit in the clubs and radio and was first popular on the Houston radio station KBXX and the Dallas stations KBFB and KKDA before getting nationwide airplay.

In June 2009, the label filmed a music video for I Look Good and later debuted it on ChalieBoyTV, Chalie Boy's official YouTube page.

In September 2009, Chalie Boy signed with Battery/Jive Records, a division of Sony Music. The "I Look Good" music video was premiered on BET's 106 & Park video countdown and debuted on the countdown at the number 10 position, and reaching as high as the number 4 position. A few remixes began to surface on the Internet by numerous artists. An official remix was released to radio and iTunes, which featured Southern rappers Slim Thug, Juvenile, and Bun B.

In December 2009, Chalie Boy released a street album titled I'm Here, hosted by DJ Mr. Rogers which has received over 20,000 plays on DatPiff.com. This release featured a lot of material that was scheduled to be released on Makin' My Way 2, but instead, was released as I'm Here.

On June 1, 2010, Chalie Boy released a second street album titled The Grind Pays Off for free download on his official website.

== Discography ==
=== Albums ===
- Off tha Chain (w/ The Freestyle Kingz) (2002)
- I'm Here (Hosted by DJ. Mr. Rogers) (2009)
- The Grind Pays Off (2010)

=== Mixtapes ===
- Best of Chalie Boy & Tite (2002)
- A Gentleman & a Gangsta (w/ Tite) (2002)
- Underground Hitz (w/ Tite) (2003)
- Still Standin' (w/ Tite) (2003)
- Makin' My Way (2004)
- It's Not a Game (w/ Big Ake & Big Redd) (2004)
- Greatest Hits (2005)
- The Versatyle Child (2006)
- Greatest Hits 2 (2006)
- CHALIEMIXES (2007)
- The Return of the Versatyle Child (2008)
- Greatest Hits 3 (2008)
- Chalie Boy & Friends (2009)
- Catch Me @ the Relays 2K9 (2009)
- @D3CHALIEBOY (2009)
- Chalie Boy & Friends 2 (2009)
- Greatest Hits 4: The Rapid Ric Files (2009)
- Chalie Quotes & Sticki Notes (2009)
- Life of an Entertainer (Fear Factor Music Presentation) (2010)
- Chalie Boy & Friends 3 (2010)
- Versatyle Child 3 (2011)

=== Singles ===
- "Bumpa Grill" (2007)
- "Pullin' Up (Remix)" (featuring Magno) (2008)
- "I Look Good" (2009)
- "Look Like Money (Smell Like Dollaz)" (2010)
- "Deja Blu" (2010)
- "I'm Here" (2011)
