= Monopoly (song) =

2019 single by Ariana Grande and Victoria Monét

Single by Ariana Grande and Victoria Monét
- Released: April 1, 2019
- Recorded: February 1, 2019
- Studio: SpeakEasy (Burbank)
- Genre: R&B; trap-pop
- Length: 2:38
- Label: Republic
- Songwriters: Victoria Monét; Ariana Grande; Tim Suby; Charles Anderson; Michael Foster
- Producer: Tim Suby

Ariana Grande singles chronology
"Rule the World" (2019)	"Monopoly" (2019)	"Boyfriend" (2019)

Victoria Monét singles chronology
"Freak Remix" (2018)	"Monopoly" (2019)	"Ass Like That" (2019)

Music video
- "Monopoly" on YouTube

"Monopoly" is a song by American singers Ariana Grande and Victoria Monét. It was released on April 1, 2019, by Republic Records. The song was written by Grande, Monét, Charles Anderson, Michael Foster, and producer Tim Suby. The music video, which was shot on March 30, 2019, at Mohegan Sun in the hours leading up to a concert scheduled that night, was released alongside the single, and was directed by Alfredo Flores and Ricky Alvarez.

"Monopoly" was included on the Japanese deluxe edition of Grande's fifth studio album Thank U, Next (2019) as a bonus track, along with the official remix of "7 Rings" featuring 2 Chainz. It reached the top five in Greece and Israel and the top 20 in Ireland, Japan and New Zealand. Grande and Monét performed the song on some of the shows of the Sweetener World Tour.

== Background ==
Monét and Grande decided to make a song titled "Monopoly", finding it funny since Monét dislikes the board game and declines to play whenever Grande asks. The song was recorded on February 1, 2019.

"Monopoly" was originally slated for a March 28, 2019 release but was pushed back to April 1, 2019, to celebrate "7 Rings" 8th week at number one on the Billboard Hot 100. Grande said on Twitter that "Monopoly" is about "friendship, freedom, protecting your energy and staying right in your bag." Monét made a similar tweet stating that the track was about "good vibes and celebrations of life and friendship."

== Lyrics and composition ==
"Monopoly" is a trap-pop and "feather-light" R&B song, leading Uproxx writer Chloe Gilke to call it the "spiritual successor" to Grande's single "7 Rings" which Monét also co-wrote. The song is a celebration of Grande's success, much like "7 Rings", which charted at number one on the Hot 100 for eight weeks. Monét personally believed it was important to include the line "I like women and men", along with the lyrics "Swerve both ways, Dichotomy" (a double entendre invoking the word dyke), to highlight her sexuality because of the lack of representation for bisexual black women in her industry. In response to the attention garnered by Grande for also singing the "I like women and men" line, Grande opened up about her sexuality and revealed she doesn't label herself, tweeting that "[she hasn't labelled herself] before and still [doesn't] feel the need to now".

Grande also sings "Even though we gave up that 90%", referencing the fact that she had to give up 90% of the royalties for "7 Rings" to Rodgers and Hammerstein due to interpolating the melody of The Sound of Music's "My Favorite Things".

== Reception ==
Vulture praised the song and music video for being a "meme-heavy bisexual bop". NME wrote that following the release of Thank U, Next (2019), "Monopoly" was refreshing to hear, describing the song as "flippant and fun".

The Washington Post, Broadly, and PinkNews reported that certain fans responded negatively to the song, accusing Grande of queerbaiting. Broadly writer Gabrielle Alexa criticized the accusations, stating "the act of speculating only perpetuates attitudes that contribute to the erasure of bisexual women. Grande doesn't have to date a girl in order to count as bisexual. And we shouldn't try to make her prove her sexuality anyways."

== Credits and personnel ==
Credits adapted from Tidal.

- Ariana Grande – vocals, songwriting, vocal production
- Victoria Monét – vocals, songwriting
- Tim Suby – production, songwriting, programming
- Social House – co-production, songwriting, programming
- Kyle Mann – engineering, mixing, studio personnel
- Brendan Morawski – engineering, studio personnel

== Charts ==
Chart performance for "Monopoly"
Chart (2019)	Peak position
Australia (ARIA)	21
Belgium (Ultratip Bubbling Under Flanders)	12
Belgium (Ultratip Bubbling Under Wallonia)	37
Canada Hot 100 (Billboard)	38
China Airplay/FL (Billboard)	26
Czech Republic Singles Digital (ČNS IFPI)	45
France (SNEP)	146
Germany (GfK)	98
Greece International (IFPI)	3
Hungary (Single Top 40)	28
Hungary (Stream Top 40)	25
Ireland (IRMA)	15
Israel (Media Forest TV Airplay)	4
Japan Hot Overseas (Billboard)	11
Latvia (LAIPA)	26
Lithuania (AGATA)	17
Netherlands (Single Top 100)	76
New Zealand (Recorded Music NZ)	19
Scottish Singles Sales (Official Charts)	21
Slovakia Singles Digital (ČNS IFPI)	32
Sweden (Sverigetopplistan)	53
Switzerland (Schweizer Hitparade)	85
UK Singles (Official Charts)	23
US Billboard Hot 100	69

== Certifications ==
Certifications for "Monopoly"
Region	Certification	Certified units/sales
Australia (ARIA)	Gold	35,000^{‡}
Brazil (Pro-Música Brasil)	Platinum	40,000^{‡}
Canada (Music Canada)	Gold	40,000^{‡}
New Zealand (RMNZ)	Gold	15,000^{‡}
United Kingdom (BPI)	Silver	200,000^{‡}
^{‡} Sales+streaming figures based on certification alone.

== Release history ==
Release dates and formats for "Monopoly"
Region	Date	Format	Label	Ref.
Various	April 1, 2019	Digital download; streaming	Republic	
