= List of awards and nominations received by H.E.R. =

H.E.R. awards and nominations
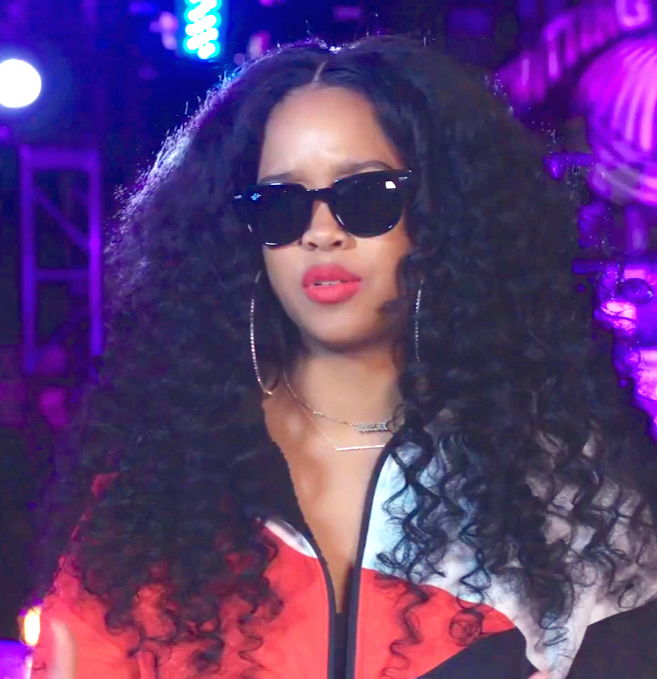
- H.E.R. in 2019
Awards and nominations
Award	Wins	Nominations
Academy Awards	1	1
Actor Awards	0	1
American Music Awards	0	3
Billboard Music Awards	0	4
Emmy Awards	1	1
Critics' Choice Awards	0	2
Golden Globe Awards	0	1
Grammy Awards	5	25
MTV Video Music Awards	1	8
NAACP Image Awards	3	25

Totals (Note: Certain award groups do not simply award one winner. They acknowledge several different recipients, have runners-up, and have third place. Since this is a specific recognition and is different from losing an award, runner-up mentions are considered wins in this award tally. For simplification and to avoid errors, each award in this list has been presumed to have had a prior nomination.)
- Wins: 31
- Nominations: 145

This is a list of awards and nominations received by H.E.R., an American singer and songwriter. An Academy, Emmy and Grammy Awards winner, H.E.R. has earned numerous awards throughout her career, being mentioned in major international award ceremonies. Since her debut, all three of her recording projects have been nominated for the Grammy Award for Album of the Year.

Her debut compilation, H.E.R., was published in 2017. It was critically acclaimed, winning the Grammy Award for Best R&B Album and the Soul Train Music Award for Album of the Year, while the lead single "Best Part" with Daniel Caesar was recognized with the Grammy Award for Best R&B Performance. Her second collection, I Used to Know Her (2019), contains the single "Hard Place", which earns the singer her first BET Awards. The same year she was recognized for Outstanding Female Artist at the NAACP Image Awards.

In 2020, H.E.R. published the single "I Can't Breathe", which won the Grammy Award for Song of the Year, the Ashford and Simpson Songwriter of the Year Award at the Soul Train Music Awards, while the related video won the Video For Good Award at both the MTV Europe Music Awards and MTV Video Music Awards. The singer first studio album, Back of My Mind, was published in 2021 and received critical support. The project, supported by the singles "Damage", "Come Through", and "Slide", earned nominations at the Grammy Award, Soul train Award and NAACP Image Awards.

In 2022, she worked on Mary J. Blige's fourteenth studio album Good Morning Gorgeous, writing and producing the eponymous track of the album, appearing vocally in the remix version. Her contribution to the record project earned her three Grammy nominations, as well as submissions for the NAACP Image Awards and Soul Train Music Awards.

In 2020, H.E.R. wrote, composed and produced "Fight for You", the soundtrack for the film Judas and the Black Messiah. The song won the Academy Award for Best Original Song, the Grammy Award for Best Traditional R&B Performance and was nominated at the Golden Globe and Critics' Choice Movie Awards. Her writing contributions on the animated series We the People earned her a Children's and Family Emmy Award for Outstanding Short Form Program.

In 2023, H.E.R. made her film debut in the second film adaptation of The Color Purple, being nominated with the cast at the Critics' Choice Movie Award and Screen Actors Guild Award.

== Awards and nominations ==
Award	Year	Category	Work	Result	Ref.
Academy Awards	2021	Best Original Song	"Fight for You"	Won	
African-American Film Critics Association Awards	2024	Best Ensemble	The Color Purple	Won	
American Music Awards	2021	Favorite Soul/R&B Female Artist	Herself	Nominated	
American Music Awards	2021	Favorite Soul/R&B Album	Back Of My Mind	Nominated	
American Music Awards	2021	Favorite Soul/R&B Song	"Damage"	Nominated	
Apple Music Awards	2021	Songwriter of the Year	Herself	Won	
Astra Film and Creative Awards	2024	Best Cast Ensemble	The Color Purple	Won	
BET Awards	2018	Best Female R&B Artist	Herself	Nominated	
BET Awards	2018	Best New Artist	Herself	Nominated	
BET Awards	2019	Best Female R&B Artist	Herself	Nominated	
BET Awards	2019	Best Collaboration	"Could've Been" (with Bryson Tiller)	Nominated	
BET Awards	2019	BET Her Awards	"Hard Place"	Won	
BET Awards	2020	Album of the Year	I Used To Know Her	Nominated	
BET Awards	2020	Best Female R&B/Pop Artist	Herself	Nominated	
BET Awards	2020	Best Collaboration	"Slide" (with YG)	Nominated	
BET Awards	2021	Best Female R&B/Pop Artist	Herself	Won	
BET Awards	2021	Dr. Bobby Jones Best Gospel/Inspirational Award	"Hold Us Together"	Nominated	
BET Awards	2022	Dr. Bobby Jones Best Gospel/Inspirational Award	"Hold Us Together (Hope Mix)" (with Tauren Wells)	Nominated	
BET Awards	2022	Best Female R&B/Pop Artist	Herself	Nominated	
BET Awards	2022	Album of the Year	Back Of My Mind	Nominated	
BET Awards	2023	Best Female R&B/Pop Artist	Herself	Nominated	
Billboard Music Awards	2019	Top R&B Artist	Herself	Nominated	
Billboard Music Awards	2019	Top R&B Female Artist	Herself	Nominated	
Billboard Music Awards	2019	Top R&B Album	H.E.R.	Nominated	
Billboard Music Awards	2021	Top R&B Song	"B.S." (with Jhene Aiko)	Nominated	
Black Reel Awards	2021	Outstanding Original Song	"Fight for You"	Nominated	
Black Reel Awards	2022	Outstanding Original Song	"Automatic Woman"	Won	
Black Reel Awards	2025	Outstanding Original Song	"The Journey"	Won	
BMI R&B/Hip-Hop Awards	2021	Most Performed Songs	"Slide"	Won	
BMI R&B/Hip-Hop Awards	2022	Most Performed Songs	"B.S."	Won	
BMI R&B/Hip-Hop Awards	2022	Most Performed Songs	"Damage"	Won	
BMI R&B/Hip-Hop Awards	2023	Most Performed Songs	"Come Through"	Won	
Celebration of Cinema and Television	2023	Ensemble Award – Film	The Color Purple	Won	
Children's and Family Emmy Awards	2022	Outstanding Short Form Program	We the People	Won	
CMT Music Awards	2022	CMT Performance of the Year	"Hold On" (with Chris Stapleton)	Nominated	
Critics' Choice Movie Awards	2021	Best Song	"Fight for You"	Nominated	
Critics' Choice Movie Awards	2024	Best Acting Ensemble	The Color Purple	Nominated	
Georgia Film Critics Association Awards	2023	Best Ensemble	The Color Purple	Nominated	
Golden Globe Awards	2021	Best Original Song	"Fight for You"	Nominated	
Grammy Awards	2019	Album of the Year	H.E.R.	Nominated	
Grammy Awards	2019	Best New Artist	Herself	Nominated	
Grammy Awards	2019	Best R&B Performance	"Best Part" (with Daniel Caesar)	Won	
Grammy Awards	2019	Best R&B Song	"Focus"	Nominated	
Grammy Awards	2019	Best R&B Album	H.E.R.	Won	
Grammy Awards	2020	Album of the Year	I Used to Know Her	Nominated	
Grammy Awards	2020	Record of the Year	"Hard Place"	Nominated	
Grammy Awards	2020	Song of the Year	"Hard Place"	Nominated	
Grammy Awards	2020	Best R&B Performance	"Could've Been" (with Bryson Tiller)	Nominated	
Grammy Awards	2020	Best R&B Song	"Could've Been" (with Bryson Tiller)	Nominated	
Grammy Awards	2021	Song of the Year	"I Can't Breathe"	Won	
Grammy Awards	2021	Best R&B Song	"Slow Down" (with Skip Marley)	Nominated	
Grammy Awards	2021	Best R&B Song	"Better Than I Imagined" (with Robert Glasper and Meshell Ndegeocello)	Won	
Grammy Awards	2022	Album of the Year	Back of My Mind	Nominated	
Grammy Awards	2022	Best R&B Album	Back of My Mind	Nominated	
Grammy Awards	2022	Song of the Year	"Fight for You"	Nominated	
Grammy Awards	2022	Best Traditional R&B Performance	"Fight for You"	Won	
Grammy Awards	2022	Best Song Written for Visual Media	"Fight for You"	Nominated	
Grammy Awards	2022	Best R&B Performance	"Damage"	Nominated	
Grammy Awards	2022	Best R&B Song	"Damage"	Nominated	
Grammy Awards	2022	Best Contemporary Christian Music Performance/Song	"Hold Us Together" (Hope Mix) (with Tauren Wells)	Nominated	
Grammy Awards	2023	Album of the Year	Good Morning Gorgeous (As featured artist, producer & songwriter)	Nominated	
Grammy Awards	2023	Record of the Year	"Good Morning Gorgeous" (As producer/songwriter)	Nominated	
Grammy Awards	2023	Best R&B Song	"Good Morning Gorgeous" (As producer/songwriter)	Nominated	
Grammy Awards	2023	Best Dance/Electronic Recording	"Intimidated" (with Kaytranada)	Nominated	
Guild of Music Supervisors Awards	2022	Best Song Written and/or Recorded for Television	"We the People"	Nominated	
Hollywood Music in Media Awards	2021	Best Original Song in a Feature Film	"Fight for You"	Nominated	
Hollywood Music in Media Awards	2021	Best Original Song in a TV Show/Limited Series	"Change"	Won	
Hollywood Music in Media Awards	2024	Best Original Song – Feature Film	"The Journey"	Won	
iHeartRadio Music Awards	2019	R&B New Artist of the Year	Herself	Nominated	
iHeartRadio Music Awards	2019	R&B Artist of the Year	Herself	Nominated	
iHeartRadio Music Awards	2020	R&B Artist of the Year	Herself	Won	
iHeartRadio Music Awards	2022	R&B Artist of the Year	Herself	Nominated	
iHeartRadio Music Awards	2022	R&B Song of the Year	"Damage"	Nominated	
Las Vegas Film Critics Society	2021	Best Song	"Fight for You"	Won	
Las Vegas Film Critics Society	2023	Best Ensemble	The Color Purple	Nominated	
MTV Europe Music Awards	2020	Video for Good	"I Can't Breathe"	Won	
MTV Europe Music Awards	2021	Video for Good	"Fight for You	Nominated	
MTV Video Music Awards	2019	Best New Artist	Herself	Nominated	
MTV Video Music Awards	2019	Push Artist of the Year	Herself	Nominated	
MTV Video Music Awards	2019	Best R&B	"Could've Been" (with Bryson Tiller)	Nominated	
MTV Video Music Awards	2020	Best R&B	"Slide" (with YG)	Nominated	
MTV Video Music Awards	2020	Video For Good	"I Can't Breathe"	Won	
MTV Video Music Awards	2021	Video For Good	"Fight for You	Nominated	
MTV Video Music Awards	2021	Best R&B	"Come Through" (featuring Chris Brown)	Nominated	
MTV Video Music Awards	2022	Best R&B	"For Anyone"	Nominated	
NAACP Image Awards	2019	Outstanding Album	I Used to Know Her: The Prelude	Nominated	
NAACP Image Awards	2019	Outstanding Female Artist	Herself	Won	
NAACP Image Awards	2019	Outstanding Song (Contemporary)	"As I Am"	Nominated	
NAACP Image Awards	2019	Outstanding Duo, Group or Collaboration	"Could've Been" (with Bryson Tiller)	Nominated	
NAACP Image Awards	2019	Outstanding Music Video	"Could've Been" (with Bryson Tiller)	Nominated	
NAACP Image Awards	2020	Outstanding Album	I Used to Know Her	Nominated	
NAACP Image Awards	2020	Outstanding Female Artist	Herself	Nominated	
NAACP Image Awards	2020	Outstanding Song (Contemporary)	"Hard Place"	Nominated	
NAACP Image Awards	2020	Outstanding Music Video/Visual Album	"Hard Place"	Nominated	
NAACP Image Awards	2021	Outstanding Female Artist	Herself	Nominated	
NAACP Image Awards	2021	Outstanding Music Video/Visual Album	"I Can't Breathe"	Nominated	
NAACP Image Awards	2021	Outstanding R&B/Soul Song	"I Can't Breathe"	Nominated	
NAACP Image Awards	2021	Outstanding R&B/Soul Song	"B.S." (with Jhene Aiko)	Nominated	
NAACP Image Awards	2021	Outstanding Duo, Group or Collaboration (Contemporary)	"B.S." (with Jhene Aiko)	Nominated	
NAACP Image Awards	2022	Outstanding Female Artist	Herself	Nominated	
NAACP Image Awards	2022	Outstanding Album	Back of My Mind	Nominated	
NAACP Image Awards	2022	Outstanding R&B/Soul Song	"Damage"	Nominated	
NAACP Image Awards	2022	Outstanding Duo, Group or Collaboration (Traditional)	"Girl like Me" (with Jazmine Sullivan)	Nominated	
NAACP Image Awards	2022	Outstanding Duo, Group or Collaboration (Contemporary)	"Come Through" (with Chris Brown)	Nominated	
NAACP Image Awards	2022	Outstanding Gospel/Christian Song	"Hold Us Together " (with Tauren Wells)	Nominated	
NAACP Image Awards	2023	Outstanding Duo, Group or Collaboration (Traditional)	"Good Morning Gorgeous" (Remix) (with Mary J. Blige)	Nominated	
NAACP Image Awards	2023	Outstanding Soul/R&B Song	"Good Morning Gorgeous" (Remix) (with Mary J. Blige)	Nominated	
NAACP Image Awards	2024	Outstanding Female Artist	Herself	Won	
NAACP Image Awards	2024	Outstanding Ensemble Cast in a Motion Picture	The Color Purple	Won	
NAACP Image Awards	2025	Outstanding Female Artist	Herself	Nominated	
Net Honours	2021	Most Played RnB Song	"Smile" (with Wizkid)	Won	
Screen Actors Guild Awards	2023	Outstanding Performance by a Cast in a Motion Picture	The Color Purple	Nominated	
Soul Train Music Awards	2017	Best New Artist	Herself	Nominated	
Soul Train Music Awards	2018	Best R&B/Soul Female Artist	Herself	Nominated	
Soul Train Music Awards	2018	Song of the Year	"Every Kind of Way"	Nominated	
Soul Train Music Awards	2018	Video of the Year	"Avenue"	Nominated	
Soul Train Music Awards	2018	Album/Mixtape of the Year	H.E.R.	Won	
Soul Train Music Awards	2018	The Ashford & Simpson Songwriter's Award	"Focus"	Nominated	
Soul Train Music Awards	2018	The Ashford & Simpson Songwriter's Award	"Best Part" (with Daniel Caesar)	Nominated	
Soul Train Music Awards	2018	Best Collaboration Performance	"Best Part" (with Daniel Caesar)	Won	
Soul Train Music Awards	2019	Best R&B/Soul Female Artist	Herself	Won	
Soul Train Music Awards	2019	Album/Mixtape of the Year	I Used to Know Her	Nominated	
Soul Train Music Awards	2019	The Ashford and Simpson Songwriter of the Year Award	"Hard Place"	Nominated	
Soul Train Music Awards	2020	Song of the Year	"Slide" (with YG)	Nominated	
Soul Train Music Awards	2020	Video of the Year	"Slide" (with YG)	Nominated	
Soul Train Music Awards	2020	Best Collaboration	"Slide" (with YG)	Nominated	
Soul Train Music Awards	2020	The Ashford and Simpson Songwriter of the Year Award	"Slide" (with YG)	Nominated	
Soul Train Music Awards	2020	Video of the Year	"Slow Down" (with Skip Marley)	Nominated	
Soul Train Music Awards	2020	Best Collaboration	"Slow Down" (with Skip Marley)	Nominated	
Soul Train Music Awards	2020	The Ashford and Simpson Songwriter of the Year Award	"I Can't Breathe"	Won	
Soul Train Music Awards	2020	Best R&B/Soul Female Artist	Herself	Won	
Soul Train Music Awards	2021	Song of the Year	"Damage"	Nominated	
Soul Train Music Awards	2021	Video of the Year	"Damage"	Nominated	
Soul Train Music Awards	2021	The Ashford and Simpson Songwriter of the Year Award	"Damage"	Nominated	
Soul Train Music Awards	2021	The Ashford and Simpson Songwriter of the Year Award	"Come Through" (with Chris Brown)	Nominated	
Soul Train Music Awards	2021	Best Collaboration	"Come Through" (with Chris Brown)	Nominated	
Soul Train Music Awards	2021	Best Collaboration	"Girl like Me" (with Jazmine Sullivan)	Nominated	
Soul Train Music Awards	2021	Best R&B/Soul Female Artist	Herself	Nominated	
Soul Train Music Awards	2021	Album of the Year	Back of My Mind	Nominated	
Soul Train Music Awards	2022	The Ashford and Simpson Songwriter of the Year Award	"Good Morning Gorgeous" (as a songwriter)	Nominated	
Soul Train Music Awards	2022	Best R&B/Soul Female Artist	Herself	Nominated	
The Headies	2020	Best Recording of the Year	"Smile" (with Wizkid)	Nominated	
The Headies	2020	Best Music Video	"Smile" (with Wizkid)	Nominated	
Urban Music Awards	2021	Best Singer/Songwriter	Back of My Mind	Nominated	
Urban Music Awards	2021	Artist of the Year (USA)	Herself	Nominated	
World Soundtrack Awards	2021	Best Original Song	"Fight for You"	Nominated	
