= H.E.R. discography =

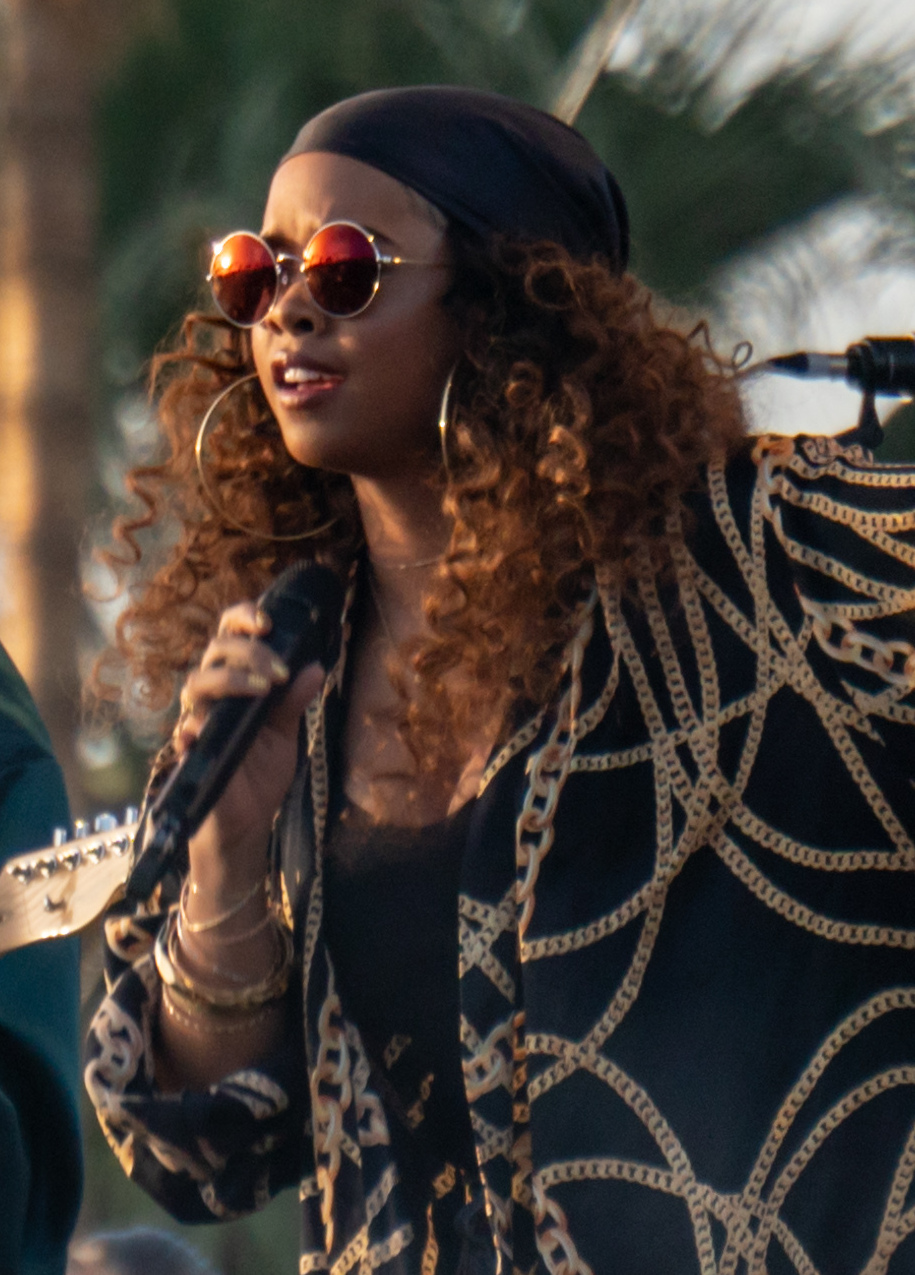
- H.E.R. performing in 2018
- Studio albums: 1
- EPs: 5
- Compilation albums: 2
- Singles: 23
- Promotional singles: 13

American R&B singer-songwriter H.E.R. has released one studio album, two compilation albums, five extended plays, twenty-three singles (including ten as a featured artist) and thirteen promotional singles.

In 2014, H.E.R. released her debut single, "Something to Prove." In 2016, "Focus" was released as her second single, from her self-titled compilation album, H.E.R., released in 2017, and her second one I Used to Know Her. H.E.R. released her first EP, H.E.R. Volume 1, in 2016; her second one, H.E.R. Volume 2, in 2017; her third one, H.E.R. Volume 2, The B Sides, in 2017; her fourth one, I Used to Know Her: The Prelude, in 2018; and her fifth one, I Used to Know Her: Part 2, in 2018. H.E.R. released her debut album, Back of My Mind, in 2021.

H.E.R. signed her first record deal with RCA records in 2011. She also wrote "Fight for You". In 2020, she published "I Can't Breathe". That single won the Grammy Award for Song of the Year. H.E.R.'s singles from Back of My Mind are "Damage", "Come Through", and "Slide". She is also the featured artist on "B.S." by Jhené Aiko.

== Albums ==
=== Studio albums ===
List of studio albums, with selected chart positions and details
Title	Album details	Peak chart positions								Certifications
Title	Album details	US	US R&B /HH	US R&B	AUS	CAN	NZ	SWI	UK	Certifications
Back of My Mind	Released: June 18, 2021; Label: RCA; Formats: Digital download, streaming	6	4	1	84	31	37	83	68	RIAA: Gold; RMNZ: Gold

=== Compilation albums ===
List of compilation albums, with selected chart positions and details
Title	Album details	Peak chart positions				Certifications
Title	Album details	US	US R&B /HH	US R&B	CAN	Certifications
H.E.R.	Released: October 20, 2017; Label: RCA; Formats: LP, CD, digital download	23	14	1	58	RIAA: Platinum; BPI: Silver; MC: Gold
I Used to Know Her	Released: August 30, 2019; Label: RCA; Formats: Digital download, streaming	86	47	7	—	RIAA: Gold; RMNZ: Gold
"—" denotes items which were not released in that country or failed to chart.

=== EPs ===
List of extended plays, with selected chart positions and details
Title	Album details	Peak chart positions			
Title	Album details	US	US R&B /HH	US R&B	CAN
H.E.R. Volume 1	Released: September 9, 2016; Label: RCA; Format: Digital download	— (Note: H.E.R. Volume 1 did not enter the Billboard 200 but peaked at number eight on the Heatseekers Albums chart.)	28	12	—
H.E.R. Volume 2	Released: June 16, 2017; Label: RCA; Format: Digital download	49	22	7	—
H.E.R. Volume 2, The B Sides	Released: October 20, 2017; Label: RCA; Format: Digital download	139	—	19	—
I Used to Know Her: The Prelude	Released: August 3, 2018; Label: RCA; Format: Digital download	20	12	1	89
I Used to Know Her: Part 2	Released: November 2, 2018; Label: RCA; Format: Digital download	87	48	10	—
"—" denotes items which were not released in that country or failed to chart.

== Singles ==
=== As lead artist ===
List of singles as lead artist with selected chart positions and certifications
Title	Year	Peak chart positions									Certifications	Album
Title	Year	US	US R&B /HH	US R&B	US Cou.	AUS	CAN	NZ Hot	UK	WW	Certifications	Album
"Something to Prove"	2014	—	—	—	—	—	—	—	—	—		Non-album single
"Focus"	2016	100	45	7	—	—	—	—	—	—	RIAA: 2× Platinum; BPI: Silver; MC: Gold; RMNZ: Platinum	H.E.R.
"Best Part" (with Daniel Caesar)	2017	75	32	4	—	—	—	—	—	—	RIAA: 7× Platinum; BPI: Platinum; MC: 4× Platinum; RMNZ: 6× Platinum	H.E.R. and Freudian
"This Way" (with Khalid)	2018	—	—	20	—	—	— (Note: "This Way" did not enter the Canadian Hot 100 but peaked at number 50 on the Canadian Digital Song Sales component chart.)	— (Note: "This Way" did not enter the NZ Top 40 Singles Chart or NZ Hot Singles Chart, but peaked at number five on the NZ Heatseeker Singles Chart.)	—	—	RIAA: Gold; RMNZ: Gold	Superfly
"Could've Been" (featuring Bryson Tiller)	2018	76	39	6	—	—	—	31	—	—	RIAA: 2× Platinum; BPI: Gold; MC: 2× Platinum; RMNZ: 2× Platinum	I Used to Know Her
"Hard Place"	2019	— (Note: "Hard Place" did not enter the Billboard Hot 100 but peaked at number 16 on the Digital Song Sales component chart.)	— (Note: "Hard Place" did not enter the Hot R&B/Hip-Hop Songs chart, but peaked at number 10 on the Bubbling Under R&B/Hip-Hop Singles chart.)	15	–	—	— (Note: "Hard Place" did not enter the Canadian Hot 100 but peaked at number 17 on the Canadian Digital Song Sales component chart.)	29	—	—	RIAA: Gold; MC: Gold; RMNZ: Gold	I Used to Know Her
"Slide" (featuring YG or Pop Smoke, A Boogie Wit da Hoodie and Chris Brown)	2019	43	16	5	–	—	—	23	—	—	RIAA: 3× Platinum; BPI: Silver (Remix); MC: 2× Platinum; RMNZ: 2× Platinum	Back of My Mind
"Slow Down" (with Skip Marley)	2019	— (Note: "Slow Down" did not enter on the Billboard Hot 100, but peaked at number five on the Bubbling Under Hot 100 chart.)	— (Note: "Slow Down" did not enter the Hot R&B/Hip-Hop Songs chart but peaked at number 16 on the R&B/Hip-Hop Digital Song Sales component chart and number six on the R&B/Hip-Hop Airplay component chart.)	9	–	—	—	—	—	—	RIAA: Gold; RMNZ: Gold	Higher Place
"I Can't Breathe"	2020	— (Note: "I Can't Breathe" did not enter the Billboard Hot 100 but peaked at number 26 on the Digital Song Sales component chart.)	— (Note: "I Can't Breathe" did not enter the Hot R&B/Hip-Hop Songs chart but peaked at number eight on the R&B/Hip-Hop Digital Song Sales component chart.)	20	—	—	—	—	—	—		Non-album single
"Damage"	2020	44	16	5	–	—	— (Note: "Damage" did not enter the Canadian Hot 100 but peaked at number 42 on the Canadian Digital Song Sales component chart.)	28	—	129	RIAA: 2× Platinum; RMNZ: Gold	Back of My Mind
"Fight for You"	2021	—	— (Note: "Fight for You" did not enter the Billboard Hot R&B/Hip-Hop Songs chart, but peaked at number 23 on the R&B/Hip-Hop Digital Song Sales chart.)	— (Note: "Fight for You" did not enter the Billboard Hot R&B Songs chart, but peaked at number 12 on the R&B Digital Songs chart.)	—	—	—	—	—	—		Judas and the Black Messiah
"Come Through" (featuring Chris Brown)	2021	64	23	6	–	96	91	3	75	74	RIAA: Gold; RMNZ: Gold	Back of My Mind
"Find a Way" (featuring Lil Baby and Lil Durk)	2021	―	― (Note: "Find a Way" did not enter the Hot R&B/Hip-Hop Songs chart but peaked at number 28 on the R&B/Hip-Hop Airplay component chart.)	15	–	―	―	37	―	—		Non-album singles
"Blessed & Free" (with Kane Brown)	2021	―	―	―	36	―	―	19	―	—	RIAA: Gold	Non-album singles
"The Glass" (with Foo Fighters)	2023	―	―	―	―	―	―	―	―	―		Non-album singles
"—" denotes items which were not released in that country or failed to chart.

=== As featured artist ===
List of singles as featured artist with selected chart positions and certifications
Title	Year	Peak chart positions									Certifications	Album
Title	Year	US	US R&B /HH	US R&B	US Rap	US World Dig.	JAM Air.	NZ Hot	UK	WW	Certifications	Album
"Right Now" (Snakehips featuring ELHAE, D.R.A.M and H.E.R.)	2017	—	—	—	—	—	*	—	—	—		Non-album singles
"Mine Luv" (BLVK JVCK featuring H.E.R.)	2017	—	—	—	—	—	*	—	—	—		Non-album singles
"Go" (Alex da Kid featuring H.E.R. and Rapsody)	2018	—	—	—	—	—	*	—	—	—		Non-album singles
"Go 2.0" (Alex da Kid featuring Jorja Smith, H.E.R. and Rapsody)	2018	—	—	—	—	—	*	—	—	—		Non-album singles
"Thursday (Remix)" (Jess Glynne featuring H.E.R.)	2019	—	—	—	—	—	*	—	—	—		Non-album singles
"Make the Most" (Lonr. featuring H.E.R.)	2020	—	— (Note: "Make the Most" did not enter the Hot R&B/Hip-Hop Songs chart but peaked at number 15 on the R&B/Hip-Hop Airplay component chart.)	—	—	—	*	—	—	—		Non-album singles
"B.S." (Jhené Aiko featuring H.E.R.)	2020	24	15	5	—	—	*	13	64	—	RIAA: 2× Platinum; BPI: Silver; RMNZ: Platinum	Chilombo
"Smile" (Wizkid featuring H.E.R.)	2020	—	—	—	—	5	*	—	—	—		Made in Lagos
"Gotta Move On" (Toni Braxton featuring H.E.R.)	2020	—	— (Note: "Gotta Move On" did not enter the Hot R&B/Hip-Hop Songs chart but peaked at number 12 on the R&B/Hip-Hop Airplay component chart.)	17	—	—	*	—	—	—		Spell My Name
"Girl like Me" (Jazmine Sullivan featuring H.E.R.)	2021	97	29	10	—	—	*	27	—	185	RIAA: Platinum	Heaux Tales
"Closer" (Saweetie featuring H.E.R.)	2022	89	30	—	24	—	*	25	—	—		Pretty Bitch Music
"Playa" (A Boogie wit da Hoodie featuring H.E.R.)	2022	— (Note: "Playa" did not enter on the Billboard Hot 100, but peaked at number 11 on the Bubbling Under Hot 100 chart.)	50	—	—	—	*	—	—	—		Me vs. Myself
"Where I Go" (NxWorries featuring H.E.R.)	2022	—	—	—	—	—	*	22	—	—		TBA
"He Loves Us Both" (Lila Iké featuring H.E.R.)	2024	—	—	—	—	—	7	—	—	—		Treasure Self Love
"—" denotes items which were not released in that country or failed to chart.

=== Promotional singles ===
List of promotional singles select chart positions and certifications
Title	Year	Peak chart positions				Certifications	Album
Title	Year	US Dig.	US R&B/HH Dig.	US Christ.	US Gospel	Certifications	Album
"Pigment"	2016	—	—	—	—		H.E.R.
"2"	2017	—	—	—	—		H.E.R.
"My Song"	2018	—	—	—	—		Non-album single
"Racks" (featuring Cordae)	2019	—	—	—	—		I Used to Know Her
"21"	2019	—	—	—	—		I Used to Know Her
"Sometimes"	2020	—	—	—	—		Non-album single
"Comfortable"	2020	—	—	—	—	RIAA: Gold	The Photograph (Original Motion Picture Soundtrack)
"Wrong Places"	2020	21	10	—	—		Non-album singles
"Do to Me"	2020	—	20	—	—		Non-album singles
"Hold On"	2020	38	7	—	—		Back of My Mind
"Hold Us Together" (with Tauren Wells)	2020	—	—	20	7		Safety
"Change"	2021	—	—	—	—		We the People
"We Made It"	2021	—	—	—	—		Back of My Mind
"–" denotes items which were not released in that country or failed to chart.

== Other charted and certified songs ==
List of other charted songs with selected chart positions and certifications
Title	Year	Peak chart positions									Certifications	Album
Title	Year	US Bub.	US R&B /HH	US R&B	US Dance	AUS	CAN	NZ Hot	SWE Heat.	WW	Certifications	Album
"Losing"	2017	—	—	—	—	—	—	—	—	—	RIAA: Gold; MC: Gold	H.E.R.
"Avenue"	2017	—	—	—	—	—	—	—	—	—	RIAA: Gold	H.E.R.
"Lights On"	2017	—	—	—	—	—	—	—	—	—	RIAA: Gold	H.E.R.
"U"	2017	—	—	—	—	—	—	—	—	—	RIAA: Gold	H.E.R.
"Every Kind of Way"	2017	—	—	—	—	—	—	—	—	—	RIAA: Platinum; RMNZ: Platinum	H.E.R.
"Changes"	2017	—	—	—	—	—	—	—	—	—	RIAA: Gold	H.E.R.
"Jungle"	2017	—	—	—	—	—	—	—	—	—	RIAA: Gold	H.E.R.
"Against Me"	2018	—	— (Note: "Against Me" did not enter the Hot R&B/Hip-Hop Songs chart, but peaked at number eight on the Bubbling Under R&B/Hip-Hop Singles chart.)	18	—	—	—	—	—	—		I Used to Know Her: The Prelude
"Feel a Way"	2018	—	—	20	—	—	—	—	—	—		I Used to Know Her: The Prelude
"As I Am"	2018	—	—	21	—	—	—	—	—	—	RIAA: Gold	I Used to Know Her: The Prelude
"Be On My Way (Interlude)"	2018	—	—	24	—	—	—	—	—	—		I Used to Know Her: The Prelude
"Gut Feeling" (Ella Mai featuring H.E.R.)	2018	21	— (Note: "Gut Feeling" did not enter the Hot R&B/Hip-Hop Songs chart, but peaked at number nine on the Bubbling Under R&B/Hip-Hop Singles chart.)	11	—	—	—	31	—	—	RIAA: Gold	Ella Mai
"Carried Away"	2018	—	—	22	—	—	—	—	—	—		I Used to Know Her: Part 2
"Come Together" (Chris Brown featuring H.E.R.)	2019	—	— (Note: "Come Together" did not enter the Hot R&B/Hip-Hop Songs chart, but peaked at number three on the Bubbling Under R&B/Hip-Hop Singles chart.)	15	—	—	—	6	—	—	RIAA: Gold; RMNZ: Gold	Indigo
"I Don't Want Your Money" (Ed Sheeran featuring H.E.R.)	2019	—	—	—	—	64	100	—	14	—		No.6 Collaborations Project
"One Second" (Stormzy featuring H.E.R.)	2019	—	—	—	—	—	—	—	—	—	BPI: Silver; RMNZ: Gold	Heavy Is the Head
"Christmas Time Is Here"	2020	—	—	23	—	—	—	—	—	—		Non-album single
"We Going Crazy" (DJ Khaled featuring H.E.R. and Migos)	2021	3	47	—	—	—	—	—	—	177		Khaled Khaled
"I Can Have It All" (Note: "I Can Have It All" solo version in album Back of My Mind without Meek Mill.) (DJ Khaled featuring Bryson Tiller, H.E.R., and Meek Mill)	2021	18	—	—	—	—	—	—	—	—		Khaled Khaled
"Intimidated" (Kaytranada featuring H.E.R.)	2021	—	—	—	9	—	—	13	—	—	RIAA: Gold; ARIA: Gold; BPI: Gold; RMNZ: Platinum	Intimidated
"Chronicles" (Cordae featuring H.E.R. and Lil Durk)	2022	7	47	—	—	—	—	—	14	—	RIAA: Gold	From a Birds Eye View
"Closure" (Chris Brown featuring H.E.R.)	2022	24	—	—	—	—	—	—	—	—		Breezy
"—" denotes items which were not released in that country or failed to chart.

== Guest appearances ==
Title	Year	Other artist(s)	Album
"Don't Cry"	2018	Jesper Jenset	Waves, Vol. 1 EP
"Still Down"	2018	None	Dear White People, Season 2 (A Netflix Original Series Soundtrack)
"I Can Feel It"	2018	GoldLink	Uncle Drew (Original Motion Picture Soundtrack)
"This Way"	2018	Khalid	Superfly (Original Motion Picture Soundtrack)
"Gut Feeling"	2018	Ella Mai	Ella Mai
"Feelings"	2019	Deante' Hitchcock	Just a Sample 2
"Come Together"	2019	Chris Brown	Indigo
"I Don't Want Your Money"	2019	Ed Sheeran	No.6 Collaborations Project
"B.S."	2020	Jhené Aiko	Chilombo
"Gotta Move On"	2020	Toni Braxton	Spell My Name
"Girl Like Me"	2021	Jazmine Sullivan	Heaux Tales
"We Going Crazy"	2021	DJ Khaled, Migos	Khaled Khaled
"I Can Have It All"	2021	DJ Khaled, Bryson Tiller, Meek Mill	Khaled Khaled
"Convince Me Otherwise"	2021	Maroon 5	Jordi
"When You Love Someone"	2021	Tone Stith	FWM
"Tired Of You"	2021	Yung Bleu	Moon Boy
"Chronicles"	2022	Cordae, Lil Durk	From a Birds Eye View
"Overthinking"	2022	Coi Leray	Trendsetter
"Closure"	2022	Chris Brown	Breezy
"Space"	2023	Diddy	The Love Album: Off the Grid
"Risk It All"	2024	Usher	Coming Home
"Love the Way (Down for You Part 2)"	2025	Mobb Deep, Nas, Kool G Rap	Infinite
