= Soul Train Music Award for The Ashford & Simpson Songwriter's Award =

Annual US music award

This page lists the winners and nominees for the Soul Train Music Ashford & Simpson Songwriter's Award. Also referred to as Record of the Year, this award was first given in 2009. John Legend currently holds the most awards in this category, with three, and Beyoncé holds the most nominations with nine.

== Winners and nominees ==
Winners are listed first and highlighted in bold.

=== 2000s ===
Year	Artist	Song	Writers	Ref
2009
2009	**Jamie Foxx (featuring T-Pain)**	**"Blame It"**	List: Christopher Henderson; Nate Walker; James T. Brown; John Conte Jr.; David Ballard; Brandon Melanchon	
2009	Beyoncé	"Single Ladies (Put a Ring on It)"	List: Christopher Stewart; Terius Nash; Thaddis Harrell; Beyoncé Knowles	
2009	Drake	"Best I Ever Had"	List: Aubrey Graham; Danny Hamilton; Dwayne Carter; Matthew Samuels; Nakia Coleman	
2009	Keri Hilson (featuring Kanye West and Ne-Yo)	"Knock You Down"	List: Nate Hills; Keri Hilson; Kevin Cossom; Shaffer Smith; Marcella Araica; Kanye West	
2009	Maxwell	"Pretty Wings"	List: Gerald Rivera; Hod David	

=== 2010s ===
Year	Artist	Song	Writers	Ref
2010
2010	**Alicia Keys**	**"Un-Thinkable (I'm Ready)"**	List: Alicia Cook; Aubrey Graham; Kerry Brothers, Jr.; Noah Shebib	
2010	El DeBarge	"Second Chance"	List: Eldra DeBarge; Mischke Butler	
2010	Drake	"Find Your Love"	List: Aubrey Graham; Patrick Reynolds; Jeff Bhasker; Kanye West	
2010	Fantasia	"Bittersweet"	List: Claude Kelly; Charles Harmon	
2010	R. Kelly	"When a Woman Loves"	Robert Kelly	
2011
2011	**Marsha Ambrosius**	**"Far Away"**	List: Marsha Ambrosius; Sterling Simms	
2011	Adele	"Rolling in the Deep"	List: Adele; Paul Epworth	
2011	Beyoncé	"Best Thing I Never Had"	List: Antonio Dixon; Kenneth Edmonds; Larry Griffin, Jr.; Beyoncé Knowles; Caleb McCampbell; Patrick "J. Que" Smith; Shea Taylor	
2011	Michael Jackson (featuring Akon)	"Hold My Hand"	List: Aliaune Thiam; Giorgio Tuinfort; Claude Kelly	
2011	Raphael Saadiq	"Good Man"	List: Raphael Saadiq; Taura Stinson	
2012
2012	**John Legend (featuring Ludacris)**	**"Tonight (Best You Ever Had)"**	List: Allen Arthur; Christopher Bridges; Keith Justice; Miguel Pimentel; Clayton Reilly; John Stephens	
2012	Estelle	"Thank You"	List: Arden Altino; Akene Dunkley; Jerry Duplessis; Doug F. Edwards; Thomas D. Richardson; Aliaune Thiam	
2012	R. Kelly	"Share My Love"	Robert Kelly	
2012	Nas	"Daughters"	List: Nasir Jones; Ernest D. Wilson; Patrick Adams; Gary DeCarlo; Dale Frashuer; Paul Leka	
2012	Usher	"Climax"	List: Usher Raymond IV; Sean Fenton; Thomas Pentz; Ariel Rechtshaid	
2013
2013	**Tamar Braxton**	**"Love and War"**	List: Tamar Braxton; Darhyl Camper Jr.; LaShawn Daniels; Makeba Riddick	
2013	Fantasia	"Lose to Win"	List: Franne Golde; Dennis Lambert; Andrea Martin; Walter Orange; Harmony Samuels	
2013	J. Cole	"Crooked Smile"	List: Jermaine Cole; Meleni Smith	
2013	Alicia Keys (featuring Maxwell)	"Fire We Make"	List: Gary Clark Jr.; Warren Felder; Alicia Keys; Andrew Wansel	
2013	Janelle Monáe (featuring Erykah Badu)	"Q.U.E.E.N."	List: Roman GianArthur Irvin; Dr. Nathaniel Irvin III; Charles Joseph II; Janelle Monáe Robinson; Kellis Parker Jr.	
2013	Justin Timberlake	"Mirrors"	List: James Fauntleroy; Jerome Harmon; Timothy Mosley; Justin Timberlake	
2014
2014	**John Legend**	**"All of Me"**	List: John Stephens; Toby Gad	
2014	Jhené Aiko	"The Worst"	List: Jhené Aiko Chilombo; Mac Robinson; Brian Warfield	
2014	Aloe Blacc	"The Man"	List: Egbert Dawkins III; Elton John; Bernie Taupin; Sam Barsh; Daniel Seeff; Khalil Abdul Rahman	
2014	Beyoncé	"Pretty Hurts"	List: Joshua Coleman; Sia Furler; Beyoncé Knowles	
2014	Sam Smith	"Stay with Me"	List: James Napier; William Phillips; Sam Smith	
2014	Pharrell Williams	"Happy"	Pharrell Williams	
2015
2015	**Common and John Legend**	**"Glory"**	List: Lonnie Lynn; John Stephens; Che Smith	
2015	J. Cole	"Apparently"	List: Jermaine Cole; Damon Coleman; Filippo Trecca	
2015	Mark Ronson (featuring Bruno Mars)	"Uptown Funk"	List: Mark Ronson; Rudolph Taylor; Lonnie Simmons; Philip Lawrence; Peter Hernandez; Jeff Bhasker; Nicholas Williams; Devon Gallaspy; Robert Wilson; Charles Wilson; Ronnie Wilson	
2015	The Weeknd	"Earned It (Fifty Shades of Grey)"	List: Abel Tesfaye; Ahmad Balshe; Jason Quenneville; Stephan Moccio	
2015	Tyrese	"Shame"	List: Tyrese Gibson; Warryn Campbell; Sam Dees; Ron Kersey; DJ Rogers, Jr.	
2016
2016	**Andra Day**	**"Rise Up"**	List: Andra Day; Jennifer Decilveo	
2016	Adele	"Hello"	List: Adele; Greg Kurstin	
2016	Beyoncé	"Formation"	List: Michael Len Williams II; Beyoncé; Khalif Brown; Jordan Frost; Asheton Hogan	
2016	Rihanna	"Needed Me"	List: Nick Audino; Rachel Derrus; Adam Feeney; Rihanna; Brittany Hazzard; Charles Hinshaw; Lewis Hughes; Dijon McFarlane; Khaled Rohaim; Te Whiti Warbrick	
2016	Bryson Tiller	"Don't"	List: Johntá Austin; Mariah Carey; Bryan-Michael Cox; Jermaine Dupri; Tavoris Hollins, Jr.; Isom Brandon Stewart; Bryson Tiller	
2017
2017	**Solange**	**"Cranes in the Sky"**	List: Troy L. John; Solange Knowles; Raphael Saadiq	
2017	Khalid	"Location"	List: Khalid Robinson; Alfredo Gonzalez; Olatunji Olutomiwa; Samuel Jimenez; Joshua Scruggs	
2017	John Legend	"Love Me Now"	List: John Legend; Blake Mills; John Ryan	
2017	Childish Gambino	"Redbone"	List: Donald Glover; George Clinton; William Earl "Bootsy" Collins; Gary "Mudbone" Cooper; Ludwig Göransson	
2017	Bruno Mars	"Versace on the Floor"	List: Bruno Mars; Philip Lawrence; Christopher Brody Brown; James Fauntleroy	
2018
2018	**Ella Mai**	**"Boo'd Up"**	List: Ella Howell; Dijon McFarlane; Joelle James; Larrance Dopson	
2018	Bruno Mars (featuring Cardi B)	"Finesse (Remix)"	List: Peter Hernandez; Belcalis Almanzar; Christopher Brody Brown; James Fauntleroy; Philip Lawrence; Ray McCullough; Klenord Raphael; Jeremy Reeves; James Yip & Ray Romulus	
2018	Childish Gambino	"Summertime Magic"	List: Donald Glover; Ludwig Göransson	
2018	Daniel Caesar (featuring H.E.R.)	"Best Part"	List: Ashton Simmonds; Gabi Wilson; Riley Bell; Matthew Burnett; Jordan Evans	
2018	H.E.R.	"Focus"	List: Gabi Wilson; Darhyl Camper; Justin Love	
2018	SZA	"Broken Clocks"	List: Solána Rowe; Cody Fayne; Adam Feeney; Ashton Simmonds; Thomas Paxton-Beesley	
2019
2019	**Beyoncé, Saint Jhn, & Wizkid (featuring Blue Ivy Carter)**	**"Brown Skin Girl"**	List: Beyoncé; Carlos St. John; Adio Marchant; Shawn Carter; Stacy Barthe; Anathi Mnyango; Michael Uzowuru; Wizkid; Richard Isong	
2019	H.E.R.	"Hard Place"	List: H.E.R.; David Harris; Sam Ashworth; James Fauntleroy; Ruby Amanfu	
2019	Lizzo	"Juice"	List: Melissa Jefferson; Theron Thomas; Eric Frederic; Sam Sumser; Sean Small	
2019	Anderson .Paak (featuring Smokey Robinson)	"Make It Better"	List: Brandon Anderson; William Robinson; Alana Chenervert; Miguel Atwood-Ferguson; Daniel Maman; Farid Nassar	
2019	Chris Brown (featuring Drake)	"No Guidance"	List: Christopher Brown; Aubrey Graham; Anderson Hernandez; Joshua Louis Huizar; Teddy Walton; Noah Shebib; Nija Charles; Tyler Bryant; Michee Lebrun	
2019	Khalid	"Talk"	List: Khalid Robinson; Guy Lawrence; Howard Lawrence	

=== 2020s ===
Year	Artist	Song	Writer(s)	Ref
2020
2020	**H.E.R.**	**"I Can't Breathe"**	H.E.R.	
2020	Beyoncé	"Black Parade"	List: Akil King; Beyoncé Knowles-Carter; Brittany Coney; Denisia Andrews; Derek James Dixie; Kim Krysiuk; Rickie Tice; Shawn Carter; Stephen Bray	
2020	Chloe x Halle	"Do It"	List: Chloe Bailey; Halle Bailey; Scott Storch; Victoria Monét; Vincent van den Ende; Anton Kuhl	
2020	Chris Brown and Young Thug	"Go Crazy"	List: Cameron Devaun Murphy; Christopher Brown; Dounia Aznou; Jeffrey Williams; Johnny Kelvin; Kaniel Castaneda; Omari Akinlolu; Orville Hall; Patrizio Pigliapoco; Phillip Price; Said Aznou; Soraya Benjelloun; Tre Samuels; Turrell Sims; Wayne Samuels; Zakaria Kharbouch	
2020	Summer Walker and Bryson Tiller	"Playing Games"	List: Summer Walker; Bryson Tiller; London Holmes; Kendall Roark Bailey; Cameron Griffin; Aubrey Robinson; Beyoncé Knowles; Kelendria Rowland; LeToya Luckett; LaTavia Roberson; LaShawn Daniels; Fred Jerkins III; Rodney Jerkins	
2020	H.E.R. (featuring YG)	"Slide"	List: Charles Carter; Elijah Dias; H.E.R.; Jermaine Dupri; Keenon Daequan Ray Jackson; Roger Parker; Ron Latour; Shawn Carter; Steve Arrington; Tiara Thomas; Waung Hankerson	
2021
2021	**Bruno Mars, Anderson Paak, Silk Sonic**	**"Leave the Door Open"**	List: Bruno Mars; Brandon Anderson; Dernst Emile II; Christopher Brody Brown	
2021	H.E.R. (featuring Chris Brown)	"Come Through"	List: Carl McCormick; Chris Brown; H.E.R.; Kelvin Wooten; Michael L. Williams II; Tiara Thomas	
2021	H.E.R.	"Damage"	List: Anthony Clemons Jr.; Carl McCormick; H.E.R.; James Harris; Jeff Gitelman; Terry Lewis; Tiara Thomas	
2021	Jazmine Sullivan	"Pick Up Your Feelings"	List: Blue June; Chi; Audra Mae Butts; Jazmine Sullivan; Kyle Coleman; Michael Holmes	
2021	Tank	"Can't Let It Show"	List: Kate Bush; Durrell Babbs	
2021	Wizkid (featuring Tems)	"Essence"	List: Ayodeji Ibrahim Balogun; Uzezi Oniko; Okiemute Oniko; Richard Isong; Temilade Openiyi	
2022
2022	**Muni Long**	**"Hrs and Hrs"**	List: Muni Long	
2022	Steve Lacy	"Bad Habit"	List: Steve Lacy; Diana Gordon; John Kirby; Britanny Fousheé; Matthew Castellanos	
2022	Beyoncé	"Break My Soul"	List: Beyoncé; Terius Nash; Christopher Stewart; Jens Christian Isaken; Shawn Carter; Freddie Ross; Adam Pigott; Allen George; Fred McFarlane	
2022	Beyoncé	"Church Girl"	List: Beyoncé; Terius Nash; Ernest Wilson; Elbernita Clark; Jimi Payton; Dion Norman; Derrick Ordogne; James Brown; Orville Hall; Phillip Price; Ralph MacDonald; William Salter	
2022	Mary J. Blige	"Good Morning Gorgeous"	List: Mary J. Blige; D'Mile; H.E.R.; David D. Brown; Tiara Thomas	
2022	SZA	"I Hate U"	List: SZA; Robert Bisel; Cody Fayne; Carter Lang; Dylan Patrice	
2022	Burna Boy	"Last Last"	List: Burna Boy; LaShawn Daniels; Harvey Mason Jr.; Fred Jerkins III; Rodney Jerkins; Mikael Haataja; Samuel Haataja; James Olagundoye; Santeri Kauppinen; Robert Laukkanen	
2022	Ari Lennox	"Pressure"	List: Ari Lennox; Anthony Parrino; Jai'Len Josey; Bryan-Michael Cox; Jermaine Dupri; Johntá Austin	
2023
2023	**SZA**	**"Snooze"**	List: SZA; Babyface; Blair Ferguson; Khris Riddick-Tynes; Leon Thomas	
2023	October London	"Back to Your Place"	List: October London	
2023	Toosii	"Favorite Song"	List: Toosii; Adelso Sicaju; Tatiana Manaois	
2023	Usher, Summer Walker and 21 Savage	"Good Good"	List: Usher; 21 Savage; Paul Dawson; Melvin Hough II; Caleb Ishman; Rafael Ishman; Jaylyn Denaie MacDonald; Tauren Stovall; Keith Thomas; Rivelino Wouter	
2023	Coco Jones	"ICU"	List: Coco Jones; Darhyl Camper Jr.; Raymond Komba; Roy Keisha Rockette	
2023	SZA	"Kill Bill"	List: SZA; Rob Bisel; Carter Lang	
2023	Victoria Monét	"On My Mama"	List: Victoria Monét; Dernst Emile II; Jeff Gitelman; Kyla Moscovich; Jamil Pierre; Charles Williams	
2023	Burna Boy (featuring 21 Savage)	"Sittin' on Top of the World"	List: Burna Boy; 21 Savage; Fred Jerkins III; Isaac Phillips; LaShawn Daniels; Mason Betha; Matthieu Le Carpentier; Nycolia "Tye-V" Turman; Rodney Jerkins; Traci Hale	

== See also ==
- Soul Train Music Award for Stevie Wonder Award – Outstanding Achievement in Songwriting
