= 2021 Soul Train Music Awards =

Music awards ceremony in New York City

Soul Train Music Awards
- Date: November 28, 2021
- Location: Apollo Theater, New York City, New York
- Country: United States
- Hosted by: Tisha Campbell & Tichina Arnold
- Most awards: Silk Sonic (Bruno Mars & Anderson .Paak) (3)
- Most nominations: H.E.R. (8)
- Website: www.bet.com/shows/soul-train-awards/

Television/radio coverage
- Network: BET, BET Her, VH1, MTV2

The 2021 Soul Train Music Awards took place on November 28, 2021, to recognize the best in soul, R&B and Hip-Hop music. The ceremony aired on BET, BET Her, VH1 and MTV2, with actors Tisha Campbell & Tichina Arnold hosting the ceremony for the fourth time. The nominations were announced on November 2, 2021, with H.E.R. leading with eight nominations, followed by Chris Brown with seven. Maxwell was honored with the Legend Award and Ashanti was honored with the Lady of Soul Award for her contributions to the music industry.

== Performances ==
2021 Soul Train Music Awards performers
Artist(s)	Song(s)	Ref.
Silk Sonic	“Fly as Me” "Smokin Out the Window"	
Ari Lennox	"Pressure"	
Lucky Daye	"Over"	
Fred Hammond	"Yahweh" "Let the Praise Begin"	
Marzz (Amplified)	"Countless Times"	
D-Nice Elle Varner Jac Ross Koryn Hawthorne Musiq Soulchild Tone Stith	"Rock the Boat" (Soul Cypher)	
Ashanti (Honoree)	"Happy" "Rain on Me" "The Way That I Love You" "Baby" "What's Luv?" (with Fat Joe) "Always on Time" (with Ja Rule) "Foolish"	
Leon Bridges	"Details"	
ELHAE (Amplified)	"FOMO"	
Summer Walker	"Unloyal" (with Ari Lennox)	
Maxwell (Honoree)	"...Til the Cops Come Knockin'" "Bad Habits" "Lifetime" "Sumthin' Sumthin'" "OFF'" "Ascension (Don't Ever Wonder)"	

== Special awards ==
Honorees are as listed below:

=== Legend Award ===
Maxwell

=== Lady of Soul Award ===
Ashanti

== Winners and nominees ==
Winners are listed below.

=== Best New Artist ===
- Yung Bleu
  - Blxst
  - Capella Grey
  - Morray
  - Tems
  - Tone Stith

=== Soul Train Certified Award ===
- Charlie Wilson
  - Anthony Hamilton
  - Ashanti
  - Isley Brothers
  - Jimmy Jam and Terry Lewis
  - T-Pain

=== Best R&B/Soul Female Artist ===
- Jazmine Sullivan
  - Alicia Keys
  - Doja Cat
  - H.E.R.
  - Jhené Aiko
  - SZA

=== Best R&B/Soul Male Artist ===
- Giveon
  - Blxst
  - Chris Brown
  - Lucky Daye
  - Tank
  - Usher

=== Best Gospel/Inspirational Award ===
- Kirk Franklin
  - Brian Courtney Wilson
  - James Fortune
  - Kelly Price
  - Maverick City Music
  - Tasha Cobbs Leonard

=== Song of the Year ===
- Silk Sonic (Bruno Mars & Anderson .Paak) – "Leave the Door Open"
  - Blxst (featuring Ty Dolla Sign and Tyga) – "Chosen"
  - H.E.R. – "Damage"
  - Jazmine Sullivan – "Pick Up Your Feelings"
  - Wizkid (featuring Tems) – "Essence"
  - Yung Bleu (featuring Drake) – "You're Mines Still"

=== Album of the Year ===
- Jazmine Sullivan – Heaux Tales
  - Blxst – No Love Lost
  - Doja Cat – Planet Her
  - Giveon – When It's All Said and Done... Take Time
  - H.E.R. – Back of My Mind
  - Wizkid – Made in Lagos

=== The Ashford & Simpson Songwriter's Award ===
- Silk Sonic (Bruno Mars & Anderson .Paak) – "Leave the Door Open"
  - Written by Bruno Mars, Brandon Anderson, Dernst Emile II, Christopher Brody Brown
- H.E.R. (featuring Chris Brown) – "Come Through"
  - Written by Carl McCormick, Chris Brown, H.E.R., Kelvin Wooten, Michael L. Williams II, Tiara Thomas
- H.E.R. – "Damage"
  - Written by Anthony Clemons Jr., Carl McCormick, H.E.R., James Harris, Jeff Gitelman, Terry Lewis, Tiara Thomas
- Jazmine Sullivan – "Pick Up Your Feelings"
  - Written by Blue June, Chi, Audra Mae Butts, Jazmine Sullivan, Kyle Coleman, Michael Holmes
- Tank – "Can't Let It Show"
  - Written by Kate Bush, Durrell Babbs
- Wizkid (featuring Tems) – "Essence"
  - Written by Ayodeji Ibrahim Balogun, Uzezi Oniko, Okiemute Oniko, Richard Isong, Temilade Openiyi

=== Best Dance Performance ===
- Normani (featuring Cardi B) – "Wild Side"
  - Chloe x Halle – "Ungodly Hour"
  - Chris Brown & Young Thug – "City Girls"
  - Lizzo (featuring Cardi B) – "Rumors"
  - Usher – "Bad Habits"

=== Best Collaboration ===
- Wizkid (featuring Tems) – "Essence"
  - Chris Brown & Young Thug (featuring Future, Lil Durk & Latto) – "Go Crazy"
  - Doja Cat (featuring SZA) – "Kiss Me More"
  - H.E.R. (featuring Chris Brown) – "Come Through"
  - Jazmine Sullivan (featuring H.E.R.) – "Girl Like Me"
  - Yung Bleu (featuring Drake) – "You're Mines Still"

=== Video of the Year ===
- Silk Sonic (Bruno Mars & Anderson .Paak) – "Leave the Door Open"
  - Chris Brown & Young Thug (featuring Future, Lil Durk & Latto) – "Go Crazy"
  - H.E.R. – "Damage"
  - Jazmine Sullivan – "Pick Up Your Feelings"
  - Normani (featuring Cardi B) – "Wild Side"
  - Wizkid (featuring Tems) – "Essence"
