= Soul Train Music Award for Best Song of the Year =

Annual US music award

This page lists the winners and nominees for the Soul Train Music Award for Best Song of the Year. The award was originally entitled Best R&B/Urban Contemporary Song of the Year and first awarded during the 1989 ceremony. It was later retitled to its current title in 1993, before being renamed again to R&B/Soul or Rap Song of the Year in 1995. The award was retired following the 1996 ceremony, seeing the separated categories for male, female and group artists returning in its place. The award returned in 2009, along with its current title.

== Winners and nominees ==
Winners are listed first and highlighted in bold.

=== 1980s ===
Year	Artist	Song	Ref
1989
1989	**Anita Baker**	**"Giving You the Best That I Got"**	
1989		" Winners l"	
1989	Michael Jackson	"Man in the Mirror"	
1989	Keith Sweat	"I Want Her"	

=== 1990s ===
Year	Artist	Song	Ref
1990
1990	**Soul II Soul (featuring Caron Wheeler)**	**"Keep On Movin'"**	
1990	Paula Abdul	"Straight Up"	
1990	Bobby Brown	"Every Little Step"	
1990	Luther Vandross	"Here and Now"	
1991
1991	**MC Hammer**	**"U Can't Touch This"**	
1991	Mariah Carey	"Vision of Love"	
1991	En Vogue	"Hold On"	
1991	Johnny Gill	"My, My, My"	
1992
1992	**Color Me Badd**	**"I Wanna Sex You Up"**	
1992	Boyz II Men	"It's So Hard to Say Goodbye to Yesterday"	
1992	Jodeci	"Forever My Lady"	
1992	BeBe & CeCe Winans	"Addictive Love"	
1993
1993	**Boyz II Men**	**"End of the Road"**	
1993	Arrested Development	"Tennessee"	
1993	En Vogue	"My Lovin' (You're Never Gonna Get It)"	
1993	Vanessa Williams	"Save the Best for Last"	
1994
1994	**Whitney Houston**	**"I Will Always Love You"**	
1994	Toni Braxton	Breathe Again	
1994	Janet Jackson	That's the Way Love Goes	
1994	Tony! Toni! Toné!	Anniversary	
1995
1995	**Barry White**	**"Practice What You Preach"**	
1995	69 Boyz	"Tootsee Roll"	
1995	Boyz II Men	"I'll Make Love to You"	
1995	R. Kelly	"Bump n' Grind"	
1996
1996	**The Notorious B.I.G. (featuring Faith Evans and Mary J. Blige)**	**"One More Chance"**	
1996	Whitney Houston	"Exhale (Shoop Shoop)"	
1996	Method Man (featuring Mary J. Blige)	"I'll Be There for You/You're All I Need to Get By"	
1996	TLC	"Waterfalls"	
1997 – 1999	—N/a		

=== 2000s ===
Year	Artist	Song	Ref
2009
2009	**Beyoncé**	**"Single Ladies (Put a Ring on It)"**	
2009	Keri Hilson (featuring Lil Wayne)	"Turnin Me On"	
2009	Jennifer Hudson	"Spotlight"	
2009	Mary Mary	"God in Me"	
2009	Maxwell	"Pretty Wings"	

=== 2010s ===
Year	Artist	Song	Ref
2010	**B.o.B (featuring Bruno Mars)**	**"Nothin' on You"**	
2010	Alicia Keys	"Un-Thinkable (I'm Ready)"	
2010	Monica	"Everything to Me"	
2010	Sade	"Soldier of Love"	
2010	Usher	"There Goes My Baby"	
2011	**Kelly Rowland (featuring Lil Wayne)**	**"Motivation"**	
2011	Adele	"Rolling in the Deep"	
2011	Chris Brown	"She Ain't You"	
2011	Miguel	"Sure Thing"	
2011	Jill Scott (featuring Anthony Hamilton)	"So in Love"	
2011	Kanye West (featuring Rihanna)	"All of the Lights"	
2012	**Tyrese**	**"Stay"**	
2012	Estelle	"Thank You"	
2012	John Legend (featuring Ludacris)	"Tonight (Best You Ever Had)"	
2012	Trey Songz	"Heart Attack"	
2012	Usher	"Climax"	
2012	Wale (featuring Miguel)	"Lotus Flower Bomb"	
2013	**Robin Thicke (featuring T.I. and Pharrell Williams)**	**"Blurred Lines"**	
2013	Tamar Braxton	"Love and War"	
2013	Chris Brown	"Fine China"	
2013	Kendrick Lamar (featuring Drake)	"Poetic Justice"	
2013	Rihanna	"Diamonds"	
2013	Justin Timberlake (featuring Jay Z)	"Suit & Tie"	
2014	**Pharrell Williams**	**"Happy"**	
2014	Beyoncé (featuring Jay Z)	"Drunk in Love"	
2014	Chris Brown (featuring Lil Wayne and Tyga)	"Loyal"	
2014	Drake (featuring Majid Jordan)	"Hold On, We're Going Home"	
2014	Michael Jackson and Justin Timberlake	"Love Never Felt So Good"	
2014	John Legend	"All of Me"	
2015	**Mark Ronson (featuring Bruno Mars)**	**"Uptown Funk"**	
2015	Common and John Legend	"Glory"	
2015	Jidenna and Roman GianArthur	"Classic Man"	
2015	Rihanna	"B**** Better Have My Money"	
2015	The Weeknd	"Earned It"	
2016	**Beyoncé**	**"Formation"**	
2016	Adele	"Hello"	
2016	Drake	"Controlla"	
2016	Rihanna (featuring Drake)	"Work"	
2016	Bryson Tiller	"Don't"	
2017	**Bruno Mars**	**"That's What I Like"**	
2017	Childish Gambino	"Redbone"	
2017	DJ Khaled (featuring Rihanna and Bryson Tiller)	"Wild Thoughts"	
2017	Khalid	"Location"	
2017	Solange	"Cranes in the Sky"	
2018	**Ella Mai**	**"Boo'd Up"**	
2018	Bruno Mars (featuring Cardi B)	"Finesse (Remix)"	
2018	H.E.R.	"Every Kind of Way"	
2018	SZA	"The Weekend"	
2018	The Internet	"Come Over"	
2019	**Chris Brown (featuring Drake)**	**"No Guidance"**	
2019	Beyoncé	"Before I Let Go"	
2019	Ella Mai	"Shot Clock"	
2019	Khalid	"Talk"	
2019	Lizzo	"Juice"	
2019	Summer Walker (featuring Drake)	"Girls Need Love (Remix)"	

=== 2020s ===
Year	Artist	Song	Ref
2020	**Chris Brown and Young Thug**	'**"Go Crazy"'**	
2020	Beyoncé	"Black Parade"	
2020	Chloe x Halle	"Do It"	
2020	H.E.R. (featuring YG)	"Slide"	
2020	Summer Walker and Usher	"Come Thru"	
2020	Usher (featuring Ella Mai)	"Don't Waste My Time"	
2021	**Bruno Mars, Anderson Paak, Silk Sonic**	**"Leave the Door Open"**	
2021	Blxst (featuring Ty Dolla Sign and Tyga)	"Chosen"	
2021	H.E.R.	"Damage"	
2021	Jazmine Sullivan	"Pick Up Your Feelings"	
2021	Wizkid (featuring Tems)	"Essence"	
2021	Yung Bleu (featuring Drake)	"You're Mines Still"	
2022	**Beyoncé**	**"Break My Soul"**	
2022	Mary J. Blige	"Good Morning Gorgeous"	
2022	Burna Boy	"Last Last"	
2022	Steve Lacy	"Bad Habit"	
2022	Ari Lennox	"Pressure"	
2022	Lizzo	"About Damn Time"	
2022	Muni Long	"Hrs and Hrs"	
2023	**SZA**	**"Snooze"**	
2023	Coco Jones	"ICU"	
2023	October London	"Back to Your Place"	
2023	Janelle Monáe	"Lipstick Lover"	
2023	Victoria Monét	"On My Mama"	
2023	SZA	"Kill Bill"	
2023	Toosii	"Favorite Song"	
2023	Usher, Summer Walker and 21 Savage	"Good Good"	

== See also ==
- Soul Train Music Award for Best R&B/Soul Single – Male
- Soul Train Music Award for Best R&B/Soul Single – Female
- Soul Train Music Award for Best R&B/Soul Single – Group, Band or Duo
