= Soul Train Music Award for Best Video of the Year =

Annual US music award

This page lists the winners and nominees for the Soul Train Music Award for Video of the Year. Originally entitled Best Music Video, the award has been retitled a further two times, including to The Michael Jackson Award for Best R&B/Soul or Rap Music Video before being retitled again to its current title in 2013. Janet Jackson has won this award a record six times and Beyoncé is the only artist with multiple nominations in one year.

== Winners and nominees ==
Winners are listed first and highlighted in bold.

=== 1980s ===
Year	Artist	Video	Ref
1987
1987	**Janet Jackson**	**"What Have You Done for Me Lately"**	
1987	Anita Baker	"Sweet Love"	
1987	Cameo	"Word Up"	
1987	Peter Gabriel	"Sledgehammer"	
1988
1988	**Janet Jackson**	**"Control"**	
1988	Whitney Houston	"I Wanna Dance with Somebody (Who Loves Me)"	
1988	Michael Jackson	"The Way You Make Me Feel"	
1988	Jody Watley	"Looking for a New Love"	
1989
1989	**Michael Jackson**	**"Man in the Mirror"**	
1989	DJ Jazzy Jeff & the Fresh Prince	"Parents Just Don't Understand"	
1989	Kool Moe Dee	"Wild Wild West"	
1989	Stevie Wonder	"Skeletons"	

=== 1990s ===
Year	Artist	Video	Ref
1990
1990	**Janet Jackson**	**"Rhythm Nation"**	
1990	Eric Gable	"Remember (The First Time)"	
1990	Quincy Jones	"I'll Be Good to You"	
1990	Prince	"Batdance"	
1991
1991	**Janet Jackson**	**"Alright"**	
1991	En Vogue	"Hold On"	
1991	MC Hammer	"U Can't Touch This"	
1991	Public Enemy	"911 Is a Joke"	
1992
1992	**MC Hammer**	**"Too Legit to Quit"**	
1992	Boyz II Men	"It's So Hard to Say Goodbye to Yesterday"	
1992	Natalie Cole	"Unforgettable"	
1992	Michael Jackson	"Black or White"	
1993
1993	**Boyz II Men**	**"End of the Road"**	
1993	Arrested Development	"People Everyday"	
1993	En Vogue	"Giving Him Something He Can Feel"	
1993	Michael Jackson	"Remember the Time"	
1994
1994	**Janet Jackson**	**"If"**	
1994	Arrested Development	"Mr. Wendal"	
1994	Toni Braxton	"Breathe Again"	
1994	Dr. Dre	"Nuthin' but a 'G' Thang"	
1995
1995	**Aaron Hall**	**"I Miss You"**	
1995	Anita Baker	"Body & Soul"	
1995	Boyz II Men	"Let It Snow"	
1995	Coolio	"Fantastic Voyage"	
1996
1996	**TLC**	**"Waterfalls"**	
1996	Coolio (featuring L.V.)	"Gangsta's Paradise"	
1996	Dr. Dre	"Keep Their Heads Ringin'"	
1996	Michael Jackson and Janet Jackson	"Scream"	
1997
1997	**Bone Thugs-N-Harmony**	**"Tha Crossroads"**	
1997	2Pac (featuring K-Ci & JoJo)	"How Do U Want It" / "California Love"	
1997	LL Cool J	"Doin' It"	
1997	Busta Rhymes	"Woo Hah!! Got You All in Check"	
1998
1998	**Puff Daddy and Faith Evans (featuring 112)**	**"I'll Be Missing You"**	
1998	Busta Rhymes	"Put Your Hands Where My Eyes Can See"	
1998	Missy Elliott	"The Rain (Supa Dupa Fly)"	
1998	The Notorious B.I.G. (featuring Puff Daddy and Mase)	"Mo' Money, Mo' Problems"	
1999
1999	**Lauryn Hill**	**"Doo Wop (That Thing)"**	
1999	Busta Rhymes	"Dangerous"	
1999	Big Punisher (featuring Fat Joe)	"Still Not a Player"	
1999	Will Smith	"Gettin' Jiggy With It"	

=== 2000s ===
Year	Artist	Video	Ref
2000
2000	**Busta Rhymes (featuring Janet Jackson)**	**"What's It Gonna Be?!"**	
2000	Missy "Misdemeanor" Elliott (featuring Nas, Eve and Q-Tip)	"Hot Boyz"	
2000	Q-Tip	"Vivrant Thing"	
2000	Will Smith	"Will 2K"	
2001
2001	**Mystikal**	**"Shake Ya Ass"**	
2001	D'Angelo	"Untitled (How Does It Feel)"	
2001	Eminem	"Stan"	
2001	OutKast	"Ms. Jackson"	
2002
2002	**Missy "Misdemeanor" Elliott**	**"Get Ur Freak On"**	
2002	Isley Brothers Featuring Ron Isley	"Contagious"	
2002	Jay Z	" Girls, Girls, Girls"	
2002	Busta Rhymes	"Break Ya Neck"	
2003
2003	**Missy Elliott**	**"Work It"**	
2003	50 Cent	"Wanksta"	
2003	Nelly (featuring Kelly Rowland)	"Dilemma"	
2003	Busta Rhymes (featuring P. Diddy and Pharrell)	"Pass the Courvoisier, Part II"	
2004
2004	**OutKast**	**"Hey Ya!"**	
2004	Beyoncé (featuring Jay Z)	"Crazy in Love"	
2004	Missy Elliott (featuring Ludacris)	"Gossip Folks"	
2004	Lil' Jon & The Eastside Boyz (featuring Ying Yang Twins)	"Get Low"	
2005
2005	**Jay Z**	**"99 Problems"**	
2005	OutKast	"Roses"	
2005	Usher (featuring Ludacris and Lil' Jon)	"Yeah!"	
2005	Kanye West	"Jesus Walks"	
2006
2006	**Kanye West (featuring Jamie Foxx)**	**"Gold Digger"**	
2006	Common	"Testify"	
2006	Missy Elliott (featuring Ciara and Fat Man Scoop)	"Lose Control"	
2006	R. Kelly	"Trapped in the Closet"	
2006	LeToya	"Torn"	
2007
2007	**Jay Z**	**"Show Me What You Got"**	
2007	Beyoncé	"Irreplaceable"	
2007	Busta Rhymes (featuring will.i.am and Kelis)	"I Love My Chick"	
2007	Jim Jones	"We Fly High"	
2007	LeToya	"She Don't"	
2008 – 2009	—		

=== 2010s ===
Year	Artist	Video	Ref
2010 – 2012	—		
2013	**Janelle Monáe (featuring Erykah Badu)**	**"Q.U.E.E.N."**	
2013	Tamar Braxton	"Love and War"	
2013	Chris Brown	"Fine China"	
2013	Drake	"Started from the Bottom"	
2013	Kendrick Lamar (featuring Drake)	"Poetic Justice"	
2013	Robin Thicke (featuring T.I. and Pharrell Williams)	"Blurred Lines"	
2014	**Pharrell Williams**	**"Happy"**	
2014	Jhené Aiko	"The Worst"	
2014	Aloe Blacc	"The Man"	
2014	Beyoncé (featuring Jay Z)	"Drunk in Love"	
2014	Chris Brown (featuring Usher and Rick Ross)	"New Flame"	
2014	Usher	"Good Kisser"	
2015	**Mark Ronson (featuring Bruno Mars)**	**"Uptown Funk"**	
2015	Beyoncé	"7/11"	
2015	Jidenna and Roman GianArthur	"Classic Man"	
2015	Kendrick Lamar	"Alright"	
2015	The Weeknd	"Earned It (Fifty Shades of Grey)"	
2016	**Beyoncé**	**"Formation"**	
2016	Beyoncé	"Sorry"	
2016	Drake	"Hotline Bling"	
2016	Rihanna (featuring Drake)	"Work"	
2016	Kanye West	"Fade"	
2017	**Bruno Mars**	**"24K Magic"**	
2017	Beyoncé	"All Night"	
2017	Chris Brown (featuring Usher and Gucci Mane)	"Party"	
2017	DJ Khaled (featuring Rihanna and Bryson Tiller)	"Wild Thoughts"	
2017	Solange	"Cranes in the Sky"	
2018	**Bruno Mars (featuring Cardi B)**	**"Finesse (Remix)"**	
2018	Ella Mai	"Boo'd Up"	
2018	H.E.R.	"Avenue"	
2018	SZA	"Broken Clocks"	
2018	The Internet	"Come Over"	
2019	**Lizzo**	**"Juice"**	
2019	Alicia Keys	"Raise a Man"	
2019	Beyoncé	"Spirit"	
2019	Childish Gambino	"Feels Like Summer"	
2019	Chris Brown (featuring Drake)	"No Guidance"	
2019	Khalid	"Better"	

=== 2020s ===
Year	Artist	Video	Ref
2020	**Beyoncé, Blue Ivy, Saint Jhn and Wizkid**	**"Brown Skin Girl"**	
2020	Chloe x Halle	"Do It"	
2020	Chris Brown and Young Thug	"Go Crazy"	
2020	H.E.R. (featuring YG)	"Slide"	
2020	Lizzo	"Good as Hell"	
2020	Skip Marley and H.E.R.	"Slow Down"	
2021	**Bruno Mars, Anderson .Paak, Silk Sonic**	**"Leave the Door Open"**	
2021	Chris Brown and Young Thug (featuring Future, Lil Durk, and Latto)	"Go Crazy"	
2021	H.E.R.	"Damage"	
2021	Jazmine Sullivan	"Pick Up Your Feelings"	
2021	Normani (featuring Cardi B)	"Wild Side"	
2021	Wizkid (featuring Tems)	"Essence"	
2022	**Bruno Mars, Anderson .Paak, Silk Sonic**	**"Smokin out the Window"**	
2022	Ari Lennox	"Pressure"	
2022	Burna Boy	"Last Last"	
2022	Chlöe	"Have Mercy"	
2022	Lizzo	"About Damn Time"	
2022	Mary J. Blige	"Good Morning Gorgeous"	
2022	Muni Long	"Hrs and Hrs"	
2022	Steve Lacy	"Bad Habit"	
2023	**Victoria Monét**	**"On My Mama"**	
2023	Coco Jones	"ICU"	
2023	Janelle Monáe	"Lipstick Lover"	
2023	Lizzo	"Special"	
2023	October London	"Back to Your Place"	
2023	PinkPantheress & Ice Spice	"Boy's a Liar, Pt. 2"	
2023	SZA	"Kill Bill"	
2023	Usher	"Boyfriend"	
2023	Usher, Summer Walker & 21 Savage	"Good Good"	
