= Soul Train Music Award for Best Collaboration =

Annual US music award

This page lists the winners and nominees for the Soul Train Music Award for Best Collaboration. This category was created in the 2009 ceremony and since its creation, Chris Brown is the only artist to win the award four times.

== Winners and nominees ==
Winners are listed first and highlighted in bold.

=== 2000s ===
Year	Artist	Song	Ref
2009
2009	**Keri Hilson (featuring Kanye West and Ne-Yo)**	**"Knock You Down"**	
2009	Keyshia Cole (featuring Monica)	"Trust"	
2009	Mario (featuring Gucci Mane and Sean Garrett)	"Break Up"	
2009	Mary Mary (featuring Kierra "Kiki" Sheard)	"God in Me"	
2009	Trey Songz (featuring Drake)	"Successful"	

=== 2010s ===
Year	Artist	Song	Ref
2010 – 2012	—		
2013
2013	**Robin Thicke (featuring T.I. and Pharrell Williams)**	**"Blurred Lines"**	
2013	Brandy (featuring Chris Brown)	"Put It Down"	
2013	J. Cole (featuring Miguel)	"Power Trip"	
2013	Alicia Keys (featuring Maxwell)	"Fire We Make"	
2013	Miguel (featuring Kendrick Lamar)	"How Many Drinks?"	
2013	Janelle Monáe (featuring Erykah Badu)	"Q.U.E.E.N."	
2013	Wale (featuring Sam Dew)	"LoveHate Thing"	
2014
2014	**Chris Brown (featuring Lil Wayne and Tyga)**	**"Loyal"**	
2014	Toni Braxton and Babyface	"Hurt You"	
2014	Chris Brown (featuring Usher and Rick Ross)	"New Flame"	
2014	Robert Glasper (featuring Jill Scott)	"Calls"	
2014	Michael Jackson and Justin Timberlake	"Love Never Felt So Good"	
2014	Janelle Monáe (featuring Miguel)	"PrimeTime"	
2015
2015	**Omarion (featuring Jhené Aiko and Chris Brown)**	**"Post to Be"**	
2015	Big Sean (featuring Drake and Kanye West)	"Blessing"	
2015	Common and John Legend	"Glory"	
2015	Mark Ronson (featuring Bruno Mars)	"Uptown Funk"	
2015	Nicki Minaj (featuring Beyoncé)	"Feeling Myself"	
2016
2016	**Fat Joe and Remy Ma (featuring French Montana and Infared)**	**"All the Way Up"**	
2016	Beyoncé (featuring Kendrick Lamar)	"Freedom"	
2016	Chance the Rapper (featuring Lil Wayne and 2 Chainz)	"No Problem"	
2016	DJ Khaled (featuring Drake)	"For Free"	
2016	Rihanna (featuring Drake)	"Work"	
2017
2017	**DJ Khaled (featuring Rihanna and Bryson Tiller)**	**"Wild Thoughts"**	
2017	Jazmine Sullivan and Bryson Tiller	"Insecure"	
2017	Mary J. Blige (featuring Kanye West)	"Love Yourself"	
2017	Solange (featuring Sampha)	"Don't Touch My Hair"	
2017	SZA (featuring Travis Scott)	"Love Galore"	
2018
2018	**Daniel Caesar (featuring H.E.R.)**	**"Best Part"**	
2018	Bruno Mars (featuring Cardi B)	"Finesse (Remix)"	
2018	John Legend (featuring BloodPop)	"A Good Night"	
2018	Khalid, Ty Dolla $ign & 6lack	"OTW"	
2018	SZA (featuring Kendrick Lamar)	"Doves in the Wind"	
2019
2019	**Chris Brown (featuring Drake)**	**"No Guidance"**	
2019	Ari Lennox & J. Cole	"Shea Butter Baby"	
2019	Beyoncé, Saint Jhn & Wizkid (featuring Blue Ivy Carter)	"Brown Skin Girl"	
2019	Cardi B & Bruno Mars	"Please Me"	
2019	PJ Morton (featuring JoJo)	"Say So"	
2019	Ty Dolla $ign (featuring J. Cole)	"Purple Emoji"	

=== 2020s ===
Year	Artist	Song	Ref
2020
2020	**Chris Brown and Young Thug**	**"Go Crazy"**	
2020	H.E.R. (featuring YG)	"Slide"	
2020	Ne-Yo (featuring Jeremih)	"U 2 Luv"	
2020	Skip Marley and H.E.R.	"Slow Down"	
2020	Summer Walker and Usher	"Come Thru"	
2020	Usher (featuring Ella Mai)	"Don't Waste My Time"	
2021
2021	**Wizkid (featuring Tems)**	**"Essence"**	
2021	Chris Brown and Young Thug (featuring Future, Lil Durk and Latto)	"Go Crazy"	
2021	Doja Cat (featuring SZA)	"Kiss Me More"	
2021	H.E.R. (featuring Chris Brown)	"Come Through"	
2021	Jazmine Sullivan (featuring H.E.R.)	"Girl Like Me"	
2021	Yung Bleu (featuring Drake)	"You're Mines Still"	
2022
2022	**Ronald Isley and The Isley Brothers (featuring Beyoncé)**	**"Make Me Say It Again, Girl"**	
2022	Beyoncé (featuring Grace Jones and Tems)	"Move"	
2022	Chris Brown (featuring Wizkid)	"Call Me Every Day"	
2022	Diddy (featuring Bryson Tiller)	"Gotta Move On"	
2022	Mary J. Blige (featuring DJ Khaled)	"Amazing"	
2022	PJ Morton (featuring Stevie Wonder and Nas)	"Be Like Water"	
2022	Queen Naija and Big Sean	"Hate Our Love"	
2022	Tank (featuring J. Valentine)	"Slow"	
2023
2023	**Usher, Summer Walker and 21 Savage**	**"Good Good"**	
2023	Beyoncé (featuring Kendrick Lamar)	"America Has a Problem (Remix)"	
2023	Burna Boy (featuring 21 Savage)	"Sittin' on Top of the World"	
2023	Flo (featuring Missy Elliott)	"Fly Girl"	
2023	Lizzo (featuring SZA)	"Special (Remix)"	
2023	Metro Boomin, The Weeknd, 21 Savage and Diddy	"Creepin' (Remix)"	
2023	PinkPantheress and Ice Spice	"Boy's a Liar, Pt. 2"	
2023	Summer Walker and J. Cole	"To Summer, From Cole (Audio Hug)"	

== See also ==
- Soul Train Music Award for Best R&B/Soul Single – Group, Band or Duo
