= Girl like Me (Jazmine Sullivan song) =

2021 single by Jazmine Sullivan featuring H.E.R.

Single by Jazmine Sullivan featuring H.E.R.

from the album Heaux Tales
- Released: January 6, 2021
- Length: 3:45
- Label: RCA
- Songwriters: Gabriella Wilson; Jazmine Sullivan; Tarron Crayton; Ufuro Ebong
- Producer: BongoByTheWay

Jazmine Sullivan singles chronology
"Pick Up Your Feelings" (2020)	"Girl like Me" (2021)	"Hurt Me So Good" (2022)

H.E.R. singles chronology
"Damage" (2020)	"Girl like Me" (2021)	"Fight for You" (2021)

"Girl like Me" is a song by American singer Jazmine Sullivan featuring American singer H.E.R. It was released on January 6, 2021, as the third single from Sullivan's fourth studio album, Heaux Tales (2021). The song was written by Sullivan, H.E.R., and Tarron Crayton, along with its producer, BongoByTheWay.

== Composition ==
"Girl like Me" is a guitar-driven ballad that lasts three minutes and 43 seconds.

== Critical reception ==
"Girl like Me" received generally positive reviews from music critics. Daniel Kreps of Rolling Stone wrote that Sullivan showcased her "acrobatic" vocals on the song. Justin Curto of Vulture also complimented her vocals on the song and felt that the song was a "stronger indictment" than her 2008 single "Bust Your Windows" ever was. Mankaprr Conteh of Pitchfork interpreted that Sullivan and Wilson "sing of the hos in Fashion Nova dresses who steal their love interests away from them". A writer from BET identified it as a standout track on the album. Cahleb Derry of CED Radio named the song the best song of 2021, citing it as the album's "most personal and perhaps controversial" track that describes "the realization that the rulebook that men wrote should not and cannot be followed because the rules are rooted in misogyny and controlling woman anyway." Chris Deville of Stereogum called it a "minimal" acoustic ballad "that gives both vocalists plenty of space to show off".

== Awards and nominations ==
Organization	Year	Category	Result	Ref.
Suol Train Music Awards	2021	Best Collaboration	Nominated	
NAACP Image Awards	2022	Outstanding Duo, Group or Collaboration (Traditional)	Nominated	

== Charts ==
Chart performance for "Girl like Me"
Chart (2021)	Peak position
Global 200 (Billboard)	185
New Zealand Hot Singles (RMNZ)	27
US Billboard Hot 100	97
US Hot R&B/Hip-Hop Songs (Billboard)	29
US Hot R&B Songs (Billboard)	10

== Certifications ==
Certifications for "Girl like Me"
Region	Certification	Certified units/sales
United States (RIAA)	Platinum	1,000,000^{‡}
^{‡} Sales+streaming figures based on certification alone.
