= Soul Train Music Award for Best R&B/Soul Female Artist =

Annual US music award

- Country: United States
- Presented by: BET
- First award: 2009
- Currently held by: SZA

Highlights
- Most awards: Beyoncé (4)

This page lists the winners and nominees for the Soul Train Music Award for Best R&B/Soul Female Artist, which was first given in 2009. Beyoncé holds the record of most wins in this category, with four.

== Winners and nominees ==
Winners are listed first and highlighted in bold.

=== 2000s ===
Year	Artist	Ref
2009
2009	**Beyoncé**	
2009	Whitney Houston	
2009	Jennifer Hudson	
2009	Ledisi	
2009	Chrisette Michele	

=== 2010s ===
Year	Artist	Ref
2010	**Alicia Keys**	
2010	**Erykah Badu**	
2010	Mary J. Blige	
2010	Fantasia	
2010	Monica	
2011	**Jill Scott**	
2011	Marsha Ambrosius	
2011	Beyoncé	
2011	Mary J. Blige	
2011	Jennifer Hudson	
2011	Kelly Rowland	
2012	**Beyoncé**	
2012	Mary J. Blige	
2012	Keyshia Cole	
2012	Estelle	
2012	Fantasia	
2013	**Tamar Braxton**	
2013	Fantasia	
2013	Alicia Keys	
2013	Chrisette Michele	
2013	Janelle Monáe	
2013	Kelly Rowland	
2014	**Beyoncé**	
2014	Jhené Aiko	
2014	Marsha Ambrosius	
2014	Jennifer Hudson	
2014	Ledisi	
2014	Janelle Monáe	
2015	**Jill Scott**	
2015	Beyoncé	
2015	Tamar Braxton	
2015	Janet Jackson	
2015	Janelle Monáe	
2016	**Beyoncé**	
2016	Fantasia	
2016	Alicia Keys	
2016	Rihanna	
2016	Jill Scott	
2017	**SZA**	
2017	Lalah Hathaway	
2017	Ledisi	
2017	Mary J. Blige	
2017	Solange	
2017	Kehlani	
2018	**Ella Mai**	
2018	Mariah Carey	
2018	Beyoncé	
2018	H.E.R.	
2018	SZA	
2019	**H.E.R.**	
2019	Ari Lennox	
2019	Beyoncé	
2019	Lizzo	
2019	Mary J. Blige	
2019	Summer Walker	

=== 2020s ===
Year	Artist	Ref
2020	**H.E.R.**	
2020	Beyoncé	
2020	Alicia Keys	
2020	Jhené Aiko	
2020	Brandy	
2020	Summer Walker	
2021	**Jazmine Sullivan**	
2021	Alicia Keys	
2021	Doja Cat	
2021	H.E.R.	
2021	Jhené Aiko	
2021	SZA	
2022	**Jazmine Sullivan**	
2022	Ari Lennox	
2022	Beyoncé	
2022	H.E.R.	
2022	Lizzo	
2022	Mary J. Blige	
2022	SZA	
2022	Tems	
2023	**SZA**	
2023	Ari Lennox	
2023	Beyoncé	
2023	Coco Jones	
2023	H.E.R.	
2023	Janelle Monáe	
2023	Summer Walker	
2023	Victoria Monét	

== See also ==
- List of music awards honoring women
