= Back of My Mind (H.E.R. album) =

Studio album by H.E.R.
- Released: June 18, 2021
- Recorded: September 2019–April 2021
- Genres: R&B; soul
- Length: 79:18
- Label: RCA
- Producers: Asa Taccone; Bordeaux; Cardiak; Cardo; Chi Chi; Darkchild; DJ Camper; DJ Khaled; Flippa; Grades; H.E.R.; Hit-Boy; Hue Strother; Jeff "Gitty" Gitelman; Kaytranada; Mario Luciano; Mike Will Made It; Non Native; Nova Wav; Scribz Riley; StreetRunner; Tarik Azzouz; Thundercat; Thurdi; Wu10

H.E.R. chronology
I Used to Know Her (2019)	Back of My Mind (2021)

Singles from Back of My Mind
- 1. "Slide" Released: September 27, 2019; 2. "Damage" Released: October 21, 2020; 3. "Come Through" Released: April 23, 2021

Back of My Mind is the debut studio album by American singer and songwriter H.E.R. It was released through RCA Records on June 18, 2021. The album features guest performances from YG, Lil Baby, Cordae, Ty Dolla Sign, Yung Bleu, Bryson Tiller, Chris Brown, and DJ Khaled. The music on the album was written and produced with a host of musicians, including a variety of American record producers such as Mike Will Made-It, Hit-Boy, Kaytranada, Thundercat, and Darkchild, among others.

Back of My Mind was met with positive reactions, with critics praising the singer's musical showcase to a greater, matured extent, and the album's cohesion within various R&B sounds. The album was preceded by three singles: "Slide" (featuring YG), "Damage", and "Come Through" (featuring Chris Brown). The album contains an alternative version of the song, "I Can Have It All", which also appears on Khaled's Khaled Khaled (2021). The album debuted at number six on the Billboard 200, after moving over 36,000 album-equivalent units, becoming her highest-charting album and first top 10 entry on the chart.

The album received two nominations for Album of the Year and Best R&B Album at the 64th Annual Grammy Awards, it marks her third and second nominations in the categories respectively. "Damage" also received nominations for Best R&B Performance and Best R&B Song.

== Background ==
Gabriella Wilson, professionally known as H.E.R., rose to prominence between towards the end of 2016 and at the beginning of 2017, following a series of EP's, named H.E.R. Vol.1 and H.E.R. Vol.2, respectively. Following this, she released her first compilation album, known as her eponymous debut project, H.E.R., which is a combination of both formerly released EP's and a handful of additional songs, including "Best Part", a duet with R&B singer Daniel Caesar. The album was nominated for Album of the Year at the 61st Annual Grammy Awards with H.E.R. earning two Grammy awards the same year. Following the release of H.E.R., she released a new compilation album in 2019, also a combination of formerly released EP's, titled I Used to Know Her. In 2020, following the George Floyd protests, she released the song, "I Can't Breathe". The song was awarded with Song of the Year at the 63rd Annual Grammy Awards. On June 10, 2021, H.E.R announced the album release date and a trailer on her social media accounts. The following day, she announced the album pre-order, alongside the album's fifth single, "We Made It". The following week, H.E.R continues teasing the album by posting photos from its photoshoot and revealed the tracklist the day before its release.

== Singles ==
The album's lead single, called "Slide", was released on September 27, 2019. The song debuted at number 85 on the US Billboard Hot 100 in January 2020, later peaking at number 43, becoming H.E.R.'s highest entry on the chart. "Damage" was released as the second single on October 21, 2020. It reached number one on Urban Radio and peaked at number 44 on the Hot 100 chart, and was certified platinum by the RIAA on May 21, 2021. "Hold On" was then released as the first promotional single on October 25, 2020.

On April 23, 2021, H.E.R. released a track, called "Come Through", a duet with American singer Chris Brown, as the third single off the album with a music video for the song premiered on May 13. The song was certified gold by RIAA in September 2021. "We Made It" was released as the second promotional single off the album on June 11, 2021.

== Critical reception ==
Professional ratings
Aggregate scores
Source	Rating
Metacritic	75/100
Review scores
Source	Rating
Allmusic	3/5 stars
Pitchfork	6.8/10
HipHopDX	3.5/5 stars
Exclaim!	9/10
Clash	8/10

On review aggregator Metacritic, the album has a score of 75, indicating it received mainly positive reviews, based on seven critic reviews. Andy Kellman of AllMusic in a mixed review said that on the album "H.E.R. is often too accommodating". Reed Jackson of Pitchfork said that "Ballads were a staple of H.E.R.’s initial five EPs, and she again uses them frequently on Back of My Mind, for better or worse. Nearly all of them are simple and pretty". Writing for Exclaim!, Antoine-Samuel Mauffette Alavo reviewed the album positively, proclaiming H.E.R. is "in total control of her sound, with masterful command of her artistic direction" and complimenting the ease of adapting her "signature sounds" to fit the featured artists on the project. HipHopDX's Riley Wallace stated that "H.E.R. doesn’t push the genre or her artistry forward with this debut, but she more than proves herself a worthy torchbearer for the art of R&B balladry".

=== Accolades ===
Award	Year	Category	Result	Ref.
American Music Awards	2021	Favorite Soul/R&B Album	Nominated	
BET Awards	2022	Album of the Year	Nominated	
Grammy Awards	2022	Album of the Year	Nominated	
Grammy Awards	2022	Best R&B Album	Nominated	
NAACP Image Awards	2022	Outstanding Album	Nominated	
Soul Train Music Awards	2021	Album of the Year	Nominated	

== Commercial performance ==
Back of My Mind debuted at number six on the Billboard 200 chart dated July 3, 2021, with 36,000 album-equivalent units, marking H.E.R.’s best weekly performance. 29,500 of the album-equivalent units stemmed from the album's 43.56 million on-demand streams, while 5,500 were pure album sales, and 1,000 were from track-equivalent units.

The album debuted at number one on the Billboard Top R&B Albums Chart, and number four on the Billboard Top R&B/Hip-Hop Albums chart. In addition, six of the album’s tracks landed on the Hot R&B Songs chart.

H.E.R. jumped 84-32 on Billboard's Artist 100, which ranks artist popularity, giving her best showing on the chart in over two years, since she climbed to her number 26 career peak in February 2019.

== Track listing ==
Back of My Mind track listing
No.	Title	Writer(s)	Producer(s)	Length
1.	"We Made It"	Gabriella Wilson; Tiara Thomas; Elijah Dias; Darhyl Camper; Ronald Colson; David Foster; Carole Bayer Sager	DJ Camper; Flippa	5:14
2.	"Back of My Mind" (featuring Ty Dolla Sign)	Wilson; Tyrone Griffin, Jr.; Camper; Colson; Michael Simpson; Patrick Hill; Daniel Steele; Corney C. Mims	DJ Camper; Flippa	3:41
3.	"Trauma" (with Hit-Boy featuring Cordae)	Wilson; Cordae Dunston; Thomas; Chauncey Hollis	Hit-Boy	4:31
4.	"Damage"	Wilson; Thomas; Anthony Clemons; Carl McCormick; Jeff Gitelman; James Harris; Terry Lewis	Cardiak; Jeff "Gitty" Gitelman	3:47
5.	"Find a Way" (featuring Lil Baby)	Wilson; Dominique Jones; Thomas; Seandrea Sledge; Chidi Osondu	Chi Chi	3:17
6.	"Bloody Waters"	Wilson; Stephen Bruner; Latisha Hyman; Louis Celestin; Gitelman	Kaytranada; Thundercat; Gitelman	4:20
7.	"Closer to Me"	Wilson; McCormick; Brittany Coney; Denisia Andrews; Goapele Mohlabane; Anthony Anderson; Michael Aaberg	Cardiak; Nova Wav	4:06
8.	"Come Through" (featuring Chris Brown)	Wilson; Chris Brown	Cardiak; Mike Will Made It; Wu10	3:34
9.	"My Own"	Wilson; Thomas; Daniel Traynor; Michael Orabiyi	Grades; Scribz Riley	3:39
10.	"Lucky"	Wilson; Stacy Barthe; Camper	DJ Camper	3:03
11.	"Cheat Code"	Wilson; Julia Michaels; Camper; Asa Taccone	DJ Camper; Asa Taccone	3:11
12.	"Mean It"	Wilson; Charles Hinshaw; Gitelman	Gitelman	3:17
13.	"Paradise" (featuring Yung Bleu)	Wilson; Jeremy Biddle; Luis Campozano; Brendan Walsh	Bordeaux; Non Native	2:37
14.	"Process"	Wilson; Priscilla Hamilton; Gamal Lewis; Gitelman; Camper; Colson	DJ Camper; Flippa	3:54
15.	"Hold On"	Wilson; Thomas; Maxx Moore; Campozano; Walsh	Bordeaux; Non Native	3:22
16.	"Don't"	Wilson; Thomas; Camper	DJ Camper	4:01
17.	"Exhausted"	Wilson; Nelson Bridges; Steven J. Collins; Vurdell Muller; Rodney Jerkins	Darkchild	3:29
18.	"Hard to Love"	Wilson; Nasri Atweh; Gitelman	H.E.R.; Gitelman	4:02
19.	"For Anyone"	Wilson; Camper; Hue Strother	H.E.R.; DJ Camper; Hue Strother	3:54
20.	"I Can Have It All" (featuring DJ Khaled and Bryson Tiller)	Wilson; Khaled Khaled; Bryson Tiller; Robert Williams; Thomas; Coney; Andrews; Nicholas Warwar; Tarik Azzouz; Gene Page; Billy Page; Dave Lewis	DJ Khaled; StreetRunner; Tarik Azzouz	4:23
21.	"Slide" (featuring YG)	Wilson; Keenon Jackson; Thomas; Dias; Ronald LaTour; Steve Arrington; Charles Carter; Shawn Carter; Jermaine Mauldin; Waung Hankerson; Roger Parker	Cardo; Mario Luciano; Thurdi	3:56
Total length:				79:18

Apple Music edition bonus video
No.	Title	Length
22.	"Behind H.E.R's 'Back of My Mind'"	8:21

Notes

- The Apple Music version of the album credits Hit-Boy as a lead artist on "Trauma"
- "Damage" features additional vocals by Ant Clemons
- "I Can Have It All" is a solo version from the album Khaled Khaled without Meek Mill

Sample credits

- “We Made It” contains samples of “It’s the Falling in Love”, written by David Foster and Carole Bayer Sager, as performed by Bayer Sager.
- "Damage" contains samples of "Making Love in the Rain", written by James Harris and Terry Lewis, as performed by Herb Alpert featuring Lisa Keith and Janet Jackson.
- "Closer to Me" contains samples of "Closer", written by Goapele Mohlabane, Amp Live, and Mike Tiger, as performed by Goapele.
- "Cheat Code" contains samples of "The Sweetest Thing", written by Lauryn Hill as performed by Refugee Camp All-Stars featuring Hill from the Love Jones soundtrack.
- "Slide" contains an interpolation of "Money Ain't a Thang", written by Jermaine Dupri, Shawn Carter, Steve Arrington, Charles Carter, Buddy Hank, and Roger Parker, as performed by Dupri featuring Jay-Z.

== Charts ==
=== Weekly charts ===
Weekly chart performance for Back of My Mind
Chart (2021)	Peak position
Australian Albums (ARIA)	84
Canadian Albums (Billboard)	31
Japanese Download Albums (Billboard Japan)	83
New Zealand Albums (RMNZ)	37
Swiss Albums (Schweizer Hitparade)	83
UK Albums (Official Charts)	68
UK R&B Albums (Official Charts)	5
US Billboard 200	6
US Top R&B/Hip-Hop Albums (Billboard)	4

=== Year-end charts ===
Year-end chart performance for Back of My Mind
Chart (2021)	Position
US Billboard 200	175
US Top R&B/Hip-Hop Albums (Billboard)	73

== Certifications ==
Certifications for Back of My Mind
Region	Certification	Certified units/sales
New Zealand (RMNZ)	Gold	7,500^{‡}
United States (RIAA)	Gold	500,000^{‡}
^{‡} Sales+streaming figures based on certification alone.
