= Soul Train Music Award for Stevie Wonder Award – Outstanding Achievement in Songwriting =

Annual US music award

This page lists the winners for the Soul Train Music Stevie Wonder Award for Outstanding Achievement in Songwriting. The award was only given from 2006 to 2007.

== Winners ==
=== 2000s ===
Year	Artist	Ref
2006	R. Kelly	
2007	Babyface	
