= B.S. (song) =

2020 single by Jhené Aiko featuring H.E.R.

Single by Jhené Aiko featuring H.E.R.

from the album Chilombo
- Released: March 6, 2020
- Genre: R&B
- Length: 3:33
- Label: Def Jam
- Songwriters: Jhené Aiko Chilombo; Sean Anderson; Brian Warfield; Gabriella Wilson; Mac Robinson
- Producer: Fisticuffs

Jhene Aiko singles chronology
"Happiness Over Everything (H.O.E.)" (2020)	"B.S." (2020)	"Back to the Streets" (2020)

H.E.R. singles chronology
"Slow Down" (2019)	"B.S." (2020)	"I Can't Breathe" (2020)

"B.S." is a song recorded by American singer Jhené Aiko featuring fellow American singer H.E.R., released on March 6, 2020 as a single from the former's third studio album Chilombo (2020). The song was written by the artists alongside Big Sean and the producers Fisticuffs (Brian Warfield and Mac Robinson). An animated music video for the song premiered in May 2020. A remix of the song featuring Kehlani was included on the deluxe edition of Chilombo, which was released on July 17, 2020. The vinyl version of the remix features an originally intended verse by Kehlani.

The song became Aiko's second top-forty entry on the US Billboard Hot 100 and her highest-charting song in New Zealand and the UK, following the album's release. "B.S." became the fourth consecutive release from Chilombo to receive gold certification by RIAA in May 2020, for selling 500,000 units. It was certified platinum in September 2020. "B.S." went on to top rhythmic radio in December 2020.

== Commercial performance ==
"B.S." attained commercial success for both Aiko and Wilson. By entering and peaking at number twenty-four on Billboard Hot 100 for the week of March 21, 2020, the song is to date the highest charting release for both singers, with Aiko earning her second top-forty entry as a lead artist on the chart, additionally. Moreover, the song was the fifth consecutive top-ten entry from Chilombo on the component Billboard R&B Songs chart, peaking at number five. The song was eventually certified gold by RIAA on May 13, 2020, almost two months after its release. It was also Aiko's highest charting song on the New Zealand Hot Singles and UK Singles Chart, peaking at number fifteen and sixty-four, respectively.

== Charts ==
=== Weekly charts ===
Chart (2020)	Peak position
New Zealand Hot Singles (RMNZ)	15
UK Singles (Official Charts)	64
US Billboard Hot 100	24
US Hot R&B/Hip-Hop Songs (Billboard)	15
US Rhythmic Airplay (Billboard)	1

=== Year-end charts ===
Chart (2020)	Position
US Hot R&B/Hip-Hop Songs (Billboard)	66
Chart (2021)	Position
US Hot R&B/Hip-Hop Songs (Billboard)	83
US Rhythmic (Billboard)	40

== Certifications ==
Region	Certification	Certified units/sales
Brazil (Pro-Música Brasil)	Gold	20,000^{‡}
New Zealand (RMNZ)	Platinum	30,000^{‡}
United Kingdom (BPI)	Silver	200,000^{‡}
United States (RIAA)	2× Platinum	2,000,000^{‡}
^{‡} Sales+streaming figures based on certification alone.
