= Fight for You (H.E.R. song) =

2020 song by H.E.R.

Single by H.E.R.

from the album Judas and the Black Messiah: The Inspired Album
- Released: February 4, 2021
- Length: 4:30
- Label: RCA
- Composers: Gabriella Wilson; Dernst Emile II
- Lyricists: Gabriella Wilson; Tiara Thomas
- Producers: H.E.R.; D'Mile

H.E.R. singles chronology
"Girl like Me" (2021)	"Fight for You" (2021)	"Come Through" (2021)

Music video
- "Fight for You" on YouTube

"Fight for You" is a song by H.E.R. written for the 2021 film Judas and the Black Messiah. H.E.R. co-wrote it with Tiara Thomas and co-composed and co-produced it with D'Mile. RCA Records released it as a digital single on February 4, 2021.

The song received multiple film award-related nominations, including the Golden Globe Award for Best Original Song and the Critics' Choice Movie Award for Best Song, and won the Academy Award for Best Original Song at the 93rd ceremony. It also received three nominations at the 64th Annual Grammy Awards, including Song of the Year, winning for Best Traditional R&B Performance. The song reached the number 43 on Flanders' Ultratip chart.

== Composition ==
H.E.R. co-wrote "Fight for You" with Tiara Thomas, and co-composed and co-produced it with D'Mile. The song was written for the 2020 film Judas and the Black Messiah, a biographical film about how William O'Neal betrayed Fred Hampton, the chairman of the Illinois chapter of the Black Panther Party in the late 1960s. Film director Shaka King told H.E.R. he wanted to listen to "something contemporary with echoes of 1968". After he heard elements inspired by Curtis Mayfield, he approved the song. H.E.R. said that "[t]here's not much that separates that time and that story from what's going on right now with the Black Lives Matter movement in the Black community". The lyrics discuss racism, police brutality and equality.

Musically, music critics said "Fight for You" was influenced by funk-soul, 1960s rhythm and blues, and 1960s-and-1970s soul music. It has an uptempo sound and starts with "aggressive" drums.

== Promotion ==
"Fight for You" was released as the lead single from Judas and the Black Messiah: The Inspired Album on February 4, 2021. H.E.R. performed the song live at The Late Show With Stephen Colbert in February 2021 and a pre-recorded performance was broadcast at the 93rd Academy Awards pre-show, Oscars: Into the Spotlight.

== Critical reception ==
Kyle Eustice said H.E.R. conveys singer Marvin Gaye on "Fight for You". Andy Kellman commented that the singer shadows "You're the Man" by Gaye.

=== Accolades ===
At the 93rd Academy Awards, "Fight for You" won the Best Original Song award, which was called a surprise as "Io sì (Seen)", "Husavik" and "Speak Now" were seen as the favorites.

Year	Organization	Award	Result	Ref.
2020/21	Academy Awards	Best Original Song	Won	
2020	Black Reel Awards	Outstanding Original Song	Nominated	
2020	Critics' Choice Awards	Best Song	Nominated	
2020/21	Golden Globe Awards	Best Original Song	Nominated	
2022	Grammy Awards	Song of the Year	Nominated	
2022	Grammy Awards	Best Traditional R&B Performance	Won	
2022	Grammy Awards	Best Song Written for Visual Media	Nominated	
2020	Hollywood Music in Media Awards	Best Original Song in a Feature Film	Nominated	
2021	MTV Europe Music Awards	Video for Good	Nominated	

== Charts ==
Chart performance for "Fight for You"
Chart (2021)	Peak position
Belgium (Ultratip Bubbling Under Flanders)	43
US R&B/Hip-Hop Digital Songs (Billboard)	23
