= Cardiak =

American record producer (born 1988)

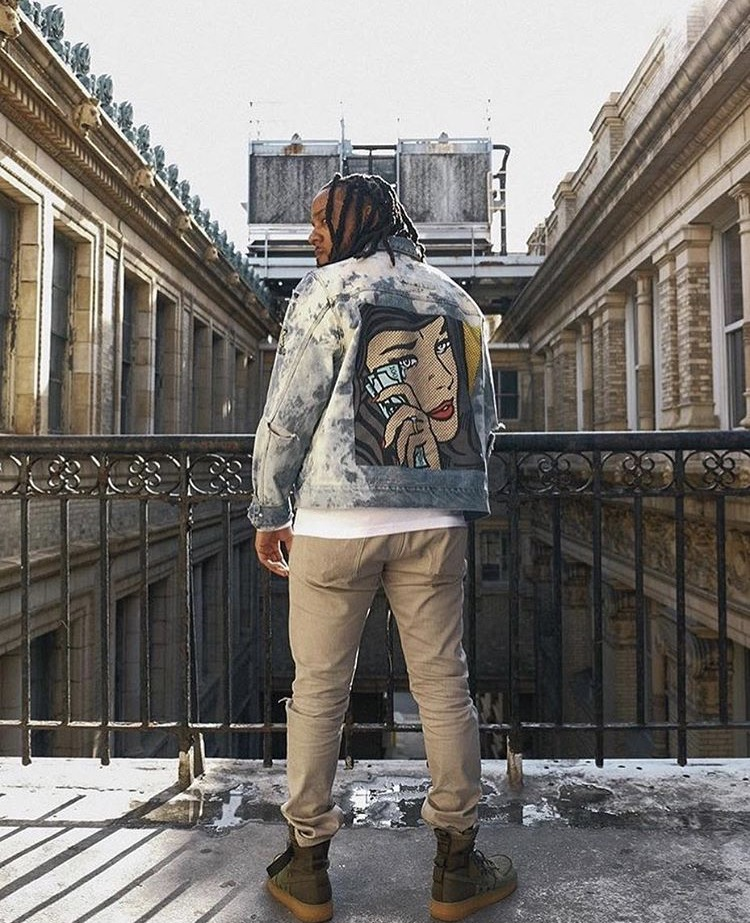
- Cardiak in 2017

Background information
- Also known as: Cardiak; Cardiak Flatline
- Born: Carl McCormick; June 26, 1988 (age 38); Willingboro Township, New Jersey, U.S.
- Genres: Hip hop; trap; R&B; pop
- Occupation: Record producer
- Years active: 2008–present
- Label: Universal

Carl McCormick (born June 26, 1988), professionally known as Cardiak, is an American record producer. He began producing music in 2008.

He has produced music for numerous artists, including Eminem, 50 Cent, Lloyd Banks, Ryan Leslie, Rick Ross, Wale, Jeezy, Meek Mill, J. Cole, Dr. Dre, Fabolous, Ace Hood, Chris Brown and Trey Songz. He has been nominated for two Grammys, both for his credit as a co-songwriter on the H.E.R. song "Damage".

== Early life ==
Carl "Cardiak" McCormick was born on June 26, 1988, in Willingboro Township, New Jersey.

In 2006, McCormick graduated from Rancocas Valley Regional High School.

== Career ==
McCormick initially began his music career in 2008 as a rapper, but wanted to produce his own music, when a close friend introduced him to FL Studio. The first track he produced landed in the hands of then-rapper Joe Budden, who released a studio album called Halfway House, with the track being titled "The Soul".

Throughout 2009, he produced tracks for former G-Unit rapper Lloyd Banks, as well as Lil Twist, LoLa Monroe, Ace Hood, and Freeway. McCormick received notoriety for his first major placement in late 2010, when he produced Lloyd Banks' single, "Start It Up," featuring Kanye West, Ryan Leslie, Swizz Beatz, and Fabolous, featured on Banks' third studio album, H.F.M. 2 (The Hunger for More 2), which released that November. The single was accompanied by McCormick's two following contributions as a producer, "Take Em to War" (featuring fellow G-Unit cohort Tony Yayo) and "Unexplainable" (featuring The Lox member Styles P). "Start It Up" peaked at number 52 on the Billboard Hot R&B/Hip-Hop Songs chart. In 2011, he produced songs for Fabolous ("Y'all Don't Really Hear Me Tho'"), Wale ("600 Benz"), Meek Mill ("Sparkle"), and Kid Ink ("My City," "Here We Go," and "Sick 'Em"). He produced 50 Cent's comeback single, "Outlaw". The track was released through 50 Cent's website. Rapper Young Chris released a mixtape, The Revival, which was entirely produced by McCormick.

In 2012, McCormick produced Meek Mill's "Lean Wit It" and "Polo & Shell Tops"; Lloyd Banks' "Show and Prove"; Ryan Leslie's "Black Flag"; Joe Budden's "Cut from a Different Cloth"; and Trae tha Truth's "Tell Me That I Can't." He also produced two tracks ("Amsterdam" and "Diced Pineapples") on Rick Ross' fifth studio album, God Forgives, I Don't, which was nominated for a Grammy Award for Best Rap Album in 2013. In 2013, McCormick's notoriety continued to soar. He later produced for Vado ("God Hour"), Ace Hood ("The Trailer" and "Have Mercy"), French Montana ("Ballin' Out"), Wale ("Bricks"), and Ryan Leslie ("Black Mozart"). Leslie's behind-the-scene process of the making of "Black Mozart" was later detailed in a YouTube mini-documentary, which featured McCormick discussing how he produced the title track and "History" with Leslie.

That November, McCormick and Frank Dukes produced the track "Groundhog Day" for rapper Eminem. The track was later included on a deluxe edition bonus disc of Eminem's eighth studio album, The Marshall Mathers LP 2, which was released on November 5, 2013. The album won a Grammy Award in 2015 for Best Rap Album.

Throughout 2014, McCormick only produced four tracks: Kid Ink's "I Don't Care," Slaughterhouse's "Party," Rick Ross' "Family Ties," and J. Cole's "Love Yourz" (the latter third he co-produced with CritaCal and Illmind, another New Jersey native). He also participated in a YouTube challenge called "Rhythm Roulette," maintained by webzine Mass Appeal (co-owned by rapper Nas), in which a record producer has to select three records blindfolded to sample while producing an instrumental using it; he created a beat using a sample from Allure's 2001 single, "Cool With Me."

In 2015, McCormick was involved in the production of two tracks, "Deep Water" and "For the Love of Money," for rapper-producer Dr. Dre. The latter beat, which developed in early 2014, was solely produced by McCormick and later sent to Dre by his A&R manager, Tyheim Cannon, and Interscope Records vice chairman, Steve Berman, for the musician's third studio album, Compton, which was released on August 7, 2015. He continued producing for Fabolous ("Doin' It Well"), Scarface ("Exit Plan"), Trey Songz ("Do It Now"), and Jeremih ("Worthy").

In early 2016, J. Cole's 2014 Forest Hills Drive (2014) and Dr. Dre's Compton (2016) were nominated for the Best Rap Album Grammy; McCormick contributed tracks as a producer on both. McCormick later received a co-composer credit after contributing to work for Drake's fourth studio album, Views, released on April 29 that year. He was credited as composer but uncredited as co-producer on the album's eighth track, "With You", which featured PartyNextDoor and instead credits Murda Beatz and Nineteen85 as co-producers. Murda Beatz later confirmed that he used a sample pack given to him by McCormick for the production of "With You." The album would end up being the most-streamed Spotify album of the year with 2.45 billion streams and debuting at number one on the Billboard 200, despite lukewarm critical reviews. He and affiliating producer Calvin "CritaCal" Price co-produced Macklemore & Ryan Lewis' "Need to Know" for their album, This Unruly Mess I've Made. Later in December, J. Cole released his fourth studio album, 4 Your Eyez Only, featuring the track "Immortal," which credits McCormick and Frank Dukes as its co-producers.

He has also collaborated with other record producers such as Hitmaka, Focus..., Symbolyc One and others. Within 2017, he expanded outside of hip hop production, working with R&B artists including Chris Brown ("Confidence"), Tank ("When We") and PartyNextDoor ("Never Played Me"). However, he still produced for rappers G-Eazy ("Crash & Burn"), Meek Mill ("Issues"), Gucci Mane ("Tone It Down"; co-produced with Hitmaka), Dave East and ASAP Ferg ("Paper Chasin'"). He also produced a bulk of singer Asiahn's extended play, Love Train, which was released earlier that year. For the 2018-19 period, McCormick continued his success at music production, producing for RL Grime ("Undo"), Cozz ("Demons N Distractions"), Dave East ("Corey"), T.I. ("Laugh at 'Em"), Zoey Dollaz ("Find a Way"), 6lack ("Loaded Gun"), YoungBoy Never Broke Again ("Permanent Scars"), Yuna ("Likes"), 2 Chainz ("Rule the World"), Cordae ("Wintertime"), Chris Brown ("Come Together"), Rick Ross ("Rich N***a Lifestyle"), Teyana Taylor ("How You Want It?") and co-produced (alongside Hitmaka) the Quality Control Music single, "Leave 'Em Alone", featuring Layton Greene, Lil Baby, City Girls and PnB Rock, which itself was a remake of singer Ciara's 2006 single, "Can't Leave 'em Alone".

In mid-2020, he, Hitmaka and Paul Cabbin produced Trey Songz and Summer Walker's "Back Home", a title track from the former's eighth studio album, Back Home, which charted at number twelve on the Billboard Hot R&B/Hip-Hop Airplay chart. He also produced two tracks for PartyNextDoor's third studio album, Partymobile ("Nothing Less" and "Believe It"). On the deluxe edition of Conway the Machine's debut album, From King to a God, McCormick and Hitmaka co-produced the bonus track, "Ameenah's Van". A successful placement that year was McCormick's production of the H.E.R. single, "Damage", which was the former's idea after listening to a freestyle, recorded by Lox members Jadakiss and Styles P, for a 2008 DJ Clue mixtape, which they were rapping over the instrumental to Herb Alpert, Lisa Keith and Janet Jackson's 1987 single, "Making Love in the Rain" (which itself was previously sampled by Queen Latifah's 1993 single, "Just Another Day..." and Bone Thugs-n-Harmony's 1996 ballad, "Days of Our Livez"). Using the same sample and having co-produced it with Jeff "Gitty" Gitelman, "Damage" debuted at number five on the Billboard Hot R&B/Hip-Hop Singles chart in late 2020, number one on R&B radio in June 2021 and was certified two-times platinum by the Recording Industry Association of America (RIAA) on March 4, 2022. "Damage" was also nominated for a Grammy for Best R&B Song in February 2022.

Throughout 2021, he continued producing tracks for Conway the Machine ("Spoon's House" and "Blood Roses"), Anthony Hamilton ("Love is the New Black"), JoJo ("Worst (I Assume)"), H.E.R. ("Come Through") and Rick Ross ("Revelations"). McCormick continued into 2022 with Tank's "No Limit", Ari Lennox's "Leak It" and 2023 with Tink's "Goofy", Chloe Bailey's "How Does It Feel" and Kiana Ledé's "Too Far". He, Elite, Pluss and Mario Luciano produced "Culture", a track performed by Mez, Reason, Symba and 8AE, which was included on the soundtrack for the boxing drama sequel film, Creed III.

On April 26, 2024, PartyNextDoor released his fourth studio album, PartyNextDoor 4, which included the track, "Control", produced by McCormick and Drake's engineer, 40.

== Production equipment and style ==
McCormick uses third-party music plugins and MIDI keyboards by M-Audio and Native Instruments to create and produce music through FL Studio through a laptop, currently optimized by Windows 11.

His production style consists of trap music, sample-based hip hop laced with live instrumentation, contemporary R&B and hip hop soul.

== Production discography ==
=== 2008 ===
==== Joe Budden – Halfway House ====
- 08. "The Soul"

==== Freeway – Month of Madness ====
- 07. "Mindstate Takeover"
- 12. "Straight Madness"
- 28. "NP Finest"
- 30. "Back for More"

=== 2009 ===
==== Lloyd Banks – The Cold Corner ====
- 05. "On My Way" (co-produced with Dilemma)

==== Havoc – From Now On ====
- 02. "Whats That Smell"
- 04. "Thats How You Feel"
- 15. "Sex Tape"

==== Lil Twist – The Yearbook ====
- 12. "I'ma Do Me"
- 15. "King"

==== Lola Monroe – Art Of Motivation ====
- 12. "Make A Way"
- 15. "Art Of Motivation"
- 23. "Divas Gettin' Money" (featuring Rasheeda)
- 35. "Bout Me"

==== Ace Hood – Street Certified ====
- 11. "Takeover"

==== Ace Hood – Ruthless ====
- 11. "Bout Me" (featuring Ballgreezy)

==== Lil Twist – Class President ====
- 07. "Forever"

==== Lola Monroe – The Untouchables ====
- 06. "Crazy World" (featuring Lil Boosie)
- 13. "Love Me"

=== 2010 ===
==== Mike Knox – Money Machine ====
- 04. "They Say I Got Issues"
- 07. "Let It Rock" (remix; featuring Red Cafe and Beanie Sigel)

==== Meek Mill – Mr. Philadelphia ====
- 04. "Hate Is My Motivator"
- 09. "This Is How We Do It" (featuring Beanie Sigel, Mel Love, and Mike Knox)
- 12. "Ain't Gonna Sleep"
- 15. "Hardbody" (featuring Peedi Crakk and Shizz Nitti)

==== Lloyd Banks – The Hunger for More 2 ====
- 01. "Take Em To War" (featuring Tony Yayo)
- 02. "Unexplainable" (featuring Styles P)
- 08. "Start It Up" (featuring Kanye West, Swizz Beatz, Fabolous and Ryan Leslie)

=== 2011 ===
==== USDA – CTE Or Nothing ====
- 03. "Off Safety"

==== Red Cafe – Above The Clouds ====
- 07. "The Realest" (featuring Lloyd Banks and Fabolous)
- 08. "Big In The Hood"
- 12. "We Get It On" (featuring Omarion)

==== Maybach Music Group – Self Made Vol. 1 ====
- 03. "600 Benz" (Wale and Rick Ross featuring Jadakiss)
- 07. "Rise" (Pill, Wale & Teedra Moses featuring Cyhi Da Prynce and Currensy)

==== Fabolous – 'The S.O.U.L. Tape (Mixtape) ====
- 08. "Y'all Don't Hear Me Tho" (featuring Red Cafe)

==== Ace Hood – Body Bag Vol.1 ====
- 10. "Just Living"
- 11. "Real Big"

==== Tory Lanez – Swavey (Mixtape) ====
- "Slept On You" (featuring Bun B)

==== Kid Ink – Daydreamer ====
- 00."My City" (featuring.Killa Kyleon, Red Cafe & Machine Gun Kelly)

==== Cory Gunz – Son Of A Gun (Mixtape) ====
- 13.Sh*t Ain't A Game (featuring Pop Dolla$)
- 17.Bedtime
- 22.Sick 'Em (Feat. Kid Ink & Gudda Gudda)

==== Ace Hood – Blood, Sweat & Tears ====
- 07."Letter to My Ex's"
- 11."Spoke to My Momma"
- 16."Real Big"

==== Triple C's – Money Burning Mother****er (Mixtape) ====
- 00."Fly ****"

==== P.L. – The Turning Lane ====
- "U Mad"

==== Meek Mill – Dreamchasers (Mixtape) ====
- 15. "Sparkle" (featuring Young Pooh)
- 17. "Y'all Don't Really Hear Me Tho Freestyle"

==== DJ Drama – Third Power ====
- 3. "Lay Low" (feat. (Young Chris, Meek Mill and Freeway)

==== Young Chris & Cardiak – The Revival (Mixtape) ====
- All tracks

==== Ace Hood – The Statement 2 (Mixtape) ====
- 11. "Pay Her Bills"

=== 2012 ===
==== French Montana & Coke Boys – Coke Boys 3 (Mixtape) ====
- 05. "Headquarters" (featuring Red Cafe)

==== Meek Mill – Dreamchasers 2 (Mixtape) ====
- 09. "Everyday"
- 11. "Lean Wit It"

==== Maybach Music Group – Self Made Vol. 2 ====
- 06. "Fountain of Youth" Stalley & Rick Ross featuring Nipsey Hussle
- 13. "Fluorescent Ink" Wale, Stalley & Rick Ross

==== Bow Wow – Underrated ====
- 02. "Where My Dogs At"
- 05. "We Going Hard" (feat. Ace Hood)

==== Lloyd Banks – V.6: The Gift ====
- 11. "Live It Up"
- 14. "Show And Prove"

==== Rick Ross – God Forgives, I Don't ====
- 07. "Amsterdam"
- 14. "Diced Pineapples" (feat. Wale and Drake)

==== DJ Drama – Quality Street Music ====
- 02. "Never Die" (feat. Jadakiss, Cee Lo Green, Nipsey Hussle and Young Jeezy)

==== Ryan Leslie – Les Is More ====
- 12. "The Black Flag"

==== Meek Mill – Dreams & Nightmares ====
- 12. "Polo & Shell Tops"

==== T.I – Trouble Man: Heavy is the Head ====
- 02. "G Season" (feat. Meek Mill; co-produced with Chinky P.)

==== Joe Budden – A Loose Quarter ====
- 4. "Cut From a Different Cloth" (feat. Ab-Soul; co-produced by CritaCal)
- 13. "All In My Head" (feat. Royce Da 5'9" and Kobe Honeycutt)
- 14. "More Of Me" (feat. Emanny)

=== 2013 ===
==== Casey Veggies – Life Changes ====
- 6. "Life$tyle"

==== Wale – The Gifted ====
- 08. "Bricks" (feat. Yo Gotti & Lyfe Jennings)

==== Ace Hood – Trials & Tribulations ====
- 03. "Another Statistic"
- 14. "Mama" (featuring Betty Wright; produced with CritaCal)
- 17. "Have Mercy" (Deluxe edition bonus track)

==== Ryan Leslie – Black Mozart ====
- 02. "Black Mozart"
- 04. "History"
- 09. "Green" (feat. Fabolous)
- 12. "Coke Cans" (co-produced by Ryan Leslie; additional production by Gabe Lambirth)

==== Joe Budden – No Love Lost ====
- 05. "You & I" featuring Emanny
- 07. "All In My Head" featuring Royce da 5'9" and Kobe
- 09. "Switch Positions" featuring Omarion
- 12. "No Love Lost Outro"

==== The Game – OKE: Operation Kill Everything ====
- 01. "Kill Everything" (feat. Diddy; co-produced by CritaCal)

==== Eminem – The Marshall Mathers LP 2 ====
- 03. "Groundhog Day" (Deluxe edition bonus track; co-produced by Frank Dukes and Eminem; additional keyboards by Luis Resto)

=== 2014 ===
==== Kid Ink – My Own Lane ====
- 12. "I Don't Care" ft Maejor Ali (co-produced by Larance Dopson of 1500 or Nothin')

==== Rick Ross – Hood Billionaire ====
- 15. "Family Ties" (co-produced by CritaCal)

==== J. Cole – 2014 Forest Hills Drive ====
- 12. "Love Yourz" (produced with Illmind and CritaCal)

=== 2015 ===
==== Trey Songz – Intermission I & II ====
- 04. "Do It Now" (produced with Hitmaka and Young 'N Fly)

==== Dr. Dre – Compton ====
- 09. "Deep Water" (feat. Kendrick Lamar, Justus and Anderson .Paak; co-produced with Dr. Dre, Focus..., Dem Jointz and DJ Dahi)
- 12. "For the Love of Money" (feat. Jon Connor, Jill Scott and Anderson .Paak)

==== Scarface – Deeply Rooted ====
- 16. "Exit Plan" (feat. Akon; Deluxe edition bonus track)

==== Fabolous – Summertime Shootout ====
- 03. "Doin' It Well" (feat. Trey Songz and Nicki Minaj; co-produced by CritaCal)

==== Jeremih – Late Nights ====
- 14. "Worthy" (feat. Jhené Aiko; co-produced by Hitmaka)

=== 2016 ===
==== Macklemore & Ryan Lewis – This Unruly Mess I've Made ====
- 08. "Need to Know" (featuring Chance the Rapper; co-produced by CritiCal)

==== Drake – Views ====
- 08. "With You" (featuring PartyNextDoor; produced by Murda Beatz; co-produced by Nineteen85; additional production by Cardiak)

==== J. Cole – 4 Your Eyez Only ====
- 02. "Immortal" (produced with Frank Dukes; additional production by J. Cole)

=== 2017 ===
==== Trey Songz – Tremaine: The Album ====
- 14. "Picture Perfect"

=== Phora – Yours Truly Forever ===
- 07. "Forever" (produced with Eskupe & Anthro Beats)

=== 2020 ===
==== T.I. – The L.I.B.R.A. ====
- 06. "Moon Juice" (with Snoop Dogg featuring Jeremih)

=== 2021 ===
==== Jazmine Sullivan – Heaux Tales ====
- 06. "On It" (featuring Ari Lennox; produced with Wu10)

== Unsorted ==
=== Mike Knox (2009) ===
- "Let it Rock" (featuring Beanie Sigel)

=== Audio Push (2010) ===
- "Got it Goin' on"

=== Havoc (2010) ===
- "Thats How You Feel (Remix)" (featuring Nyce Da Future & Cory Gunz)

=== Lola Monroe (2010) ===
- "Overtime" (featuring Trina)

=== Reed Dollaz (2010) ===
- "I Be On That Money" (featuring Peedi Crakk & Eness)

=== Meek Mill (2010) ===
- "Let's Get It" (featuring Kre Forch)

=== Mistah F.A.B. (2010) ===
- "She Don't Belong To Me" (featuring London)

=== 50 Cent (2011) ===
"Outlaw"

=== Kid Ink (2011) ===
- "Insane"
- "Tats On My Face"
- "Here We Go"

=== Young Jeezy (2011) ===
- "Off Safety" (featuring USDA)

=== Young Chris (2011) ===
- "Flatline" (featuring Lloyd Banks)

=== Mike Knox (2011) ===
- "Get Gully" (featuring 50 Cent & Freeway)

=== Ace Hood (2012) ===
- "The Trailer" (produced with Frank Dukes)

=== Slaughterhouse (2013) ===
- "Party" (co-produced by Just Blaze)

=== Dave East (2017) ===
- "Paper Chasin'" (featuring ASAP Ferg)

=== Chris Brown (2019) ===
- "Come Together" (featuring H.E.R.)

=== H.E.R. (2021) ===
- "Damage"
- "Come Through" (featuring Chris Brown)

== Singles ==
=== Lloyd Banks – The Hunger for More 2 (2010) ===
- 08. "Start It Up" (feat. Kanye West, Fabolous, Swizz Beatz and Ryan Leslie)

=== Maybach Music Group – Self Made Vol. 1 (2011) ===
- 03. "600 Benz" (Wale and Rick Ross featuring Jadakiss)

=== Lloyd Banks – TBA (2011) ===
- 00. "Check Me Out"

=== P.L. – The Turning Lane (2011) ===
- "U Mad"

=== Paypa – Feel Good Music (Unreleased) ===
- "Time Zone" feat. French Montana

== Awards and nominations ==
Year	Award	Category	Nominee(s)	Result	Ref.
2022	Grammy Awards	Album of the Year	Back of My Mind (H.E.R.)	Nominated	
2022	Grammy Awards	Best R&B Song	"Damage" (H.E.R.)	Nominated	
2025	Grammy Awards	Best R&B Song	"Here We Go (Uh Oh)" (Coco Jones)	Nominated	
