= Smile (Wizkid song) =

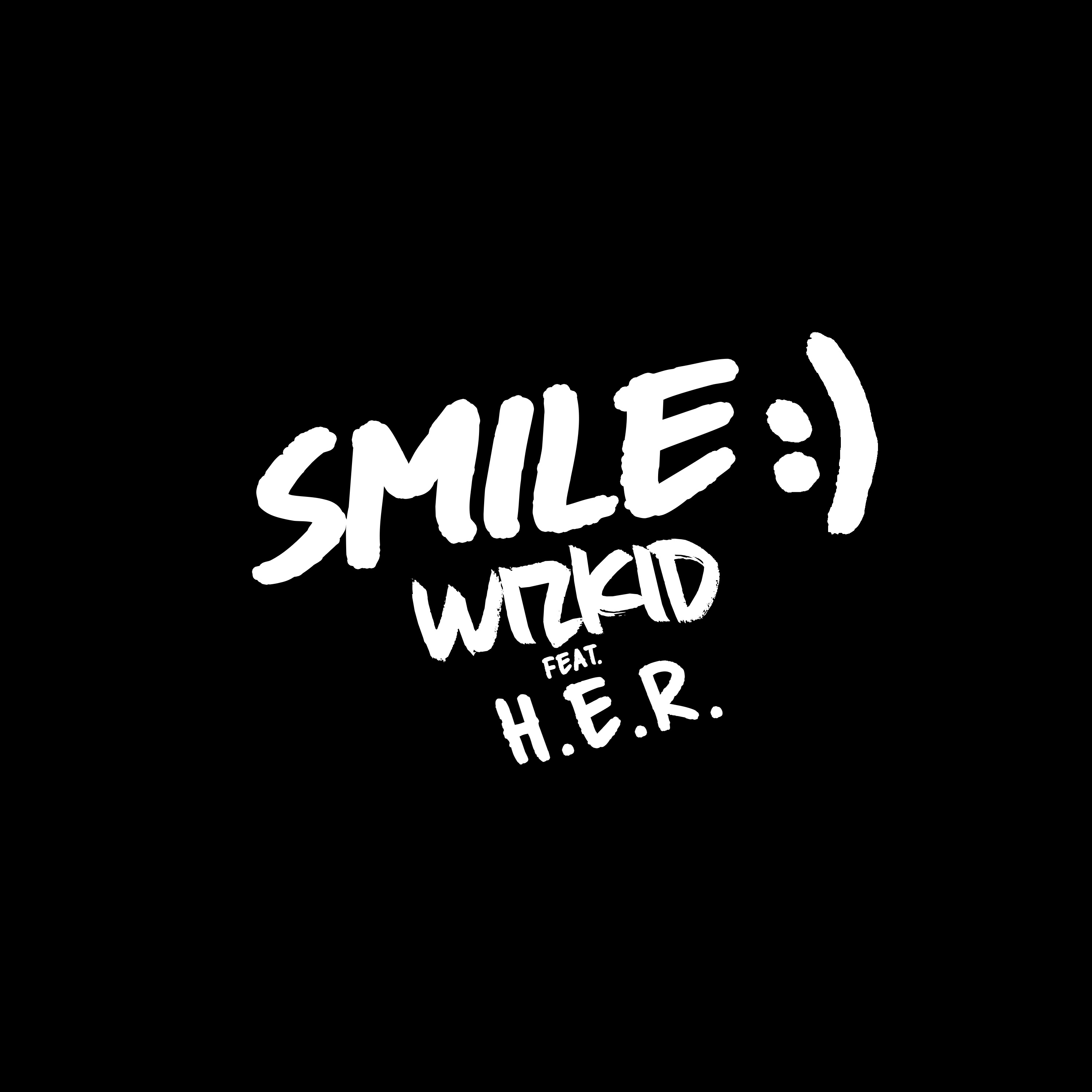

Single by Wizkid featuring H.E.R.

from the album Made in Lagos
- Released: 16 July 2020
- Genre: Reggae
- Length: 4:11
- Label: Starboy; RCA
- Songwriters: Ayodeji Balogun; Gabriella Wilson; Emmanuel Isong
- Producer: P2J

Wizkid singles chronology
"Gbese 2.0" (2020)	"Smile" (2020)	"No Stress" (2020)

H.E.R singles chronology
"Do to Me" (2020)	"Smile" (2020)	"Damage" (2020)

Music video
- "Smile" on YouTube

"Smile" is a song by Nigerian singer Wizkid featuring American R&B singer H.E.R.. It was released as the lead single off Wizkid's fourth studio album Made in Lagos on 16 July 2020. The song blends with the genre of R&B and Reggae. The song made its debut at No. 3 in the first week of launch of the UK Afrobeats Singles Chart, and was featured on Barack Obama's 2020 summer playlist.

== Background ==
Wizkid had been very active on social media, sending tweets to generate hype (for more than two years) about his fourth studio album, Made in Lagos. Prior to the release of "Smile", Wizkid released a cryptic message on his Instagram story praising several artists and producers that worked with him on the album. He wrapped up by posting his birth date, giving fans the impression that would be his album's release date. Instead, he released the song as a celebration of life, dedicating it to his three children.

== Accolades ==
MTV Africa Music Awards 2021

Year	Ceremony	Nominee/work	Award	Result	Ref
2021	MTV Africa Music Awards	"Smile"	Best Collaboration	Nominated	

Net Honours

Year	Ceremony	Nominee/work	Award	Result	Ref
2021	Net Honours	"Smile"	Most Played RnB Song	Won	

The Headies 2020

Year	Ceremony	Nominee/work	Award	Result	Ref
2020	The Headies	"Smile"	Best Recording of the Year	Nominated	
2020	The Headies	"Smile"	Best Music Video	Nominated	

== Charts ==
Chart performance for "Smile"
Chart (2020)	Peak position
US Digital R&B Songs (Billboard)	13
UK Afrobeats Singles (Official Charts Company)	3
World Digital Songs(Billboard)	5

== Certifications ==
Region	Certification	Certified units/sales
Nigeria (RCN)	Gold	2,500
South Africa (RISA)	Platinum	20,000^{‡}
^{‡} Sales+streaming figures based on certification alone.
