= I Can't Breathe (H.E.R. song) =

2020 single

Single by H.E.R.
- Released: June 19, 2020
- Genre: R&B
- Length: 4:47
- Label: RCA
- Songwriters: Dernst "D'Mile" Emile II; Gabriella Wilson; Tiara Thomas
- Producer: Dernst "D'Mile" Emile II

H.E.R. singles chronology
"B.S." (2020)	"I Can't Breathe" (2020)	"Do to Me" (2020)

Music video
- "H.E.R. - I Can't Breathe" on YouTube

"I Can't Breathe" is a song by H.E.R. released on June 19, 2020. It was written by H.E.R., D'Mile and Tiara Thomas and produced by D'Mile. It reached number 20 on Billboard's Hot R&B Songs. The song won Song of the Year at the 63rd Annual Grammy Awards, serving as H.E.R.'s first ever win in this category.

== Critical reception ==
Patricia Sanchez of Grimy Goods wrote: "While it may be hard for some to put into words the anger, frustration or pain felt after witnessing the death of George Floyd, yet another innocent, black individual lost to a deep and systemic issue in our society, H.E.R. finds the strength and wherewithal to transcend her anger into a meaningful and eloquent piece of protest art." Elizabeth Aubrey of NME called the song "powerful", while Billboard described the single as "moving".

== Accolades ==
At the 63rd Annual Grammy Awards, "I Can't Breathe" won the Song of the Year; it marks H.E.R's first win and second song to be nominated in this category after "Hard Place" (2020).

Year	Organization	Award	Result	Ref.
2020	MTV Video Music Awards	Video For Good	Won	
2020	MTV Europe Music Awards	Video for Good	Won	
2020	Soul Train Music Awards	The Ashford and Simpson Songwriter of the Year Award	Won	
2021	Grammy Awards	Song of the Year	Won	

== Music video ==
The music video for H.E.R.'s "I Can't Breathe" was released on June 26, 2020, on YouTube, and directed by Shane Adams. As of 2021, the video has received over 1.9 million views on YouTube. The music video has the song accompanying footage of different marches around the world protesting police brutality and systemic racism. The video pays tribute to victims of police brutality by displaying their names throughout the music video, some of those include George Floyd, Ahmaud Arbery, and Philando Castile.

The music video was nominated for and won both MTV's 2020 Video For Good Award and MTV Europe's 2020 award of the same name.

== Live performances ==
H.E.R. performed "I Can't Breathe" live in 2020 as a part of iHeartRadio's Living Room Concert Series Presented by State Farm. The artist also performed the song live for Apple Music on June 26, 2020, as a part of their Black Music Month.

== Charts ==
Chart (2020)	Peak position
US Hot R&B Songs (Billboard)	20

== See also ==
- Institutional racism
- Murder of George Floyd
