= Come Through (H.E.R. song) =

2021 single by H.E.R

Single by H.E.R. featuring Chris Brown

from the album Back of My Mind
- Released: April 23, 2021
- Recorded: 2021
- Genre: R&B
- Length: 3:34
- Label: RCA
- Songwriters: Gabriella Wilson; Christopher Brown
- Producers: Cardiak; Mike Will Made It; Mr. Wu10

H.E.R. singles chronology
| "Fight for You" (2021) | "Come Through" (2021) | "Find a Way" (2021) |

Chris Brown singles chronology
| "Already Best Friends" (2021) | "Come Through" (2021) | "Rain Down" (2021) |

Music video
- "Come Through" on YouTube

"Come Through" is a song written and performed by American singer H.E.R. featuring fellow American singer Chris Brown, released on April 23, 2021 through RCA Records as the third single from her debut studio album Back of My Mind (2021). The R&B duet was produced by Cardiak, Mike Will Made It and Mr. Wu10.

== Composition ==
"Come Through" is an R&B slow jam where the singers trade lines about wanting the other to cancel their plans for a possible late-night sneaky link with a close circle of friends who are looking to "get faded".

== Live performances ==
On September 20, 2021, H.E.R. and Brown performed the song live together for the first time, marking Brown's first live performance following the beginning of COVID-19 restrictions

== Music video ==
The music video was released on May 13, 2021. Throughout the music video, H.E.R. and Chris Brown are seen dancing with their respective partners who appear to be apprehensive about what's going on, ending up dancing together flirtatiously in a cabin setting.

== Charts ==
=== Weekly charts ===
| Chart (2021) | Peak position |
|---|---|
| Australia (ARIA) | 96 |
| Canada Hot 100 (Billboard) | 91 |
| Global 200 (Billboard) | 74 |
| Netherlands (Single Tip) | 8 |
| New Zealand Hot Singles (RMNZ) | 3 |
| UK Singles (Official Charts) | 75 |
| US Billboard Hot 100 | 64 |
| US Adult R&B Songs (Billboard) | 1 |
| US Hot R&B/Hip-Hop Songs (Billboard) | 23 |
| US R&B/Hip-Hop Airplay (Billboard) | 7 |
| US Rhythmic Airplay (Billboard) | 16 |

=== Year-end charts ===
| Chart (2021) | Position |
|---|---|
| US Hot R&B/Hip-Hop Songs (Billboard) | 60 |

== Certifications ==
| Region | Certification | Certified units/sales |
|---|---|---|
| Brazil (Pro-Música Brasil) | Platinum | 40,000^{‡} |
| New Zealand (RMNZ) | Gold | 15,000^{‡} |
| United States (RIAA) | Platinum | 1,000,000^{‡} |
^{‡} Sales+streaming figures based on certification alone.
