= Damage (H.E.R. song) =

2020 single by H.E.R.

Single by H.E.R.

from the album Back of My Mind
- Released: October 21, 2020
- Genre: R&B
- Length: 3:43
- Label: RCA
- Songwriters: Gabriella Wilson; Tiara Thomas; Ant Clemons; Carl McCormick; Jeff Gitelman; James Harris; Terry Lewis
- Producers: Cardiak; Jeff "Gitty" Gitelman

H.E.R. singles chronology
"Smile" (2020)	"Damage" (2020)	"Girl like Me" (2021)

Music video
- "Damage" on YouTube

"Damage" is a song by American singer H.E.R., released on October 21, 2020, through RCA Records as the second single from her debut studio album Back of My Mind (2021). It was written alongside Ant Clemons, Tiara Thomas, and producers Cardiak & Jeffy "Gitty" Gitelman, with Jimmy Jam and Terry Lewis receiving writing credits for the sampling of Herb Alpert's 1987 song "Making Love in the Rain".

== Music video ==
The music video, directed by choreographer Galen Hooks, was released on October 21, 2020. It was filmed at the Roxie Theatre in Los Angeles, H.E.R. performed at this with her band.

== Live performance ==
On October 24, 2020, H.E.R. debuted "Damage" as guest on the Adele-hosted episode of Saturday Night Live.

== Accolades ==
Year	Year	Category	Result	Ref.
2021	American Music Awards	Favorite Soul/R&B Song	Nominated	
2022	Grammy Awards	Best R&B Performance	Nominated	
2022	Grammy Awards	Best R&B Song	Nominated	
2022	iHeartRadio Music Awards	R&B Song of the Year	Nominated	
2022	NAACP Image Awards	Outstanding R&B/Soul Song	Nominated	

== Commercial performance ==
On May 13, 2021, "Damage" was certified platinum by the RIAA with more than 1 million equivalent units sold. On June 17, 2021, it was announced that it reached number one on R&B radio.

== Charts ==
=== Weekly charts ===
Weekly chart performance for "Damage"
Chart (2020–2021)	Peak position
New Zealand Hot Singles (RMNZ)	28
US Billboard Hot 100	44
US Hot R&B/Hip-Hop Songs (Billboard)	16
US Rhythmic Airplay (Billboard)	9

=== Year-end charts ===
Year-end chart performance for "Damage"
Chart (2021)	Position
US Hot R&B/Hip-Hop Songs (Billboard)	45
US R&B/Hip-Hop Airplay (Billboard)	1
US Rhythmic (Billboard)	41

== Certifications ==
Region	Certification	Certified units/sales
New Zealand (RMNZ)	Gold	15,000^{‡}
United States (RIAA)	2× Platinum	2,000,000^{‡}
^{‡} Sales+streaming figures based on certification alone.
