= Slide (H.E.R. song) =

2019 single by H.E.R. featuring YG

Single by H.E.R. featuring YG

from the album Back of My Mind
- Released: September 27, 2019
- Genre: R&B; hip hop
- Length: 3:58
- Label: RCA
- Songwriters: Gabriella Wilson; Keenon Daequan Ray Jackson; Tiara Thomas; Elijah Dias; Ron Latour; Jermaine Dupri; Shawn Carter; Steve Arrington; Charles Carter; Roger Parker; Waung Hankerson
- Producers: Cardo; Mario Luciano; Thurdi

H.E.R. singles chronology
"Hard Place" (2019)	"Slide" (2019)	"Slow Down" (2019)

YG singles chronology
"Feel Up" (2019)	"Slide" (2019)	"Mamacita" (2019)

Music video
- "Slide" on YouTube

"Slide" is a song by American singer H.E.R. featuring American rapper YG. It was released on September 27, 2019, through RCA Records as the lead single from H.E.R.'s debut studio album, Back of My Mind (2021). An official remix featuring fellow American rappers and singers Pop Smoke, A Boogie wit da Hoodie, and Chris Brown was released in January 2020.

== Background ==
H.E.R. debuted the song "Slide" during her set at the Lights On Festival. It was released as a single on September 27, 2019.

== Music video ==
The music video for "Slide" was premiered by Complex on October 17, 2019 before its official release the following day. It was directed by Mike Ho and filmed in different locations in California, including the Grand Lake Theatre and the West Oakland station. The video opens with a recording of H.E.R.'s performance at the Concord Pavilion for the inaugural Lights On Festival. Other scenes feature dance numbers, bikers, graffiti and ghost riding.

== Commercial performance ==
"Slide" debuted at 85 on the Billboard Hot 100 in January 2020. It peaked at #43, becoming H.E.R.'s highest entry on the chart. Despite never making the top-40, it managed to garner enough points to scrape the bottom of the Hot 100 year-end, at number 99. It particularly did will on hip-hop and r&b radio, reaching number 17 on the R&B/Hip-Hop Airplay and number three on the Rhythmic chart.

== Live performances ==
H.E.R. recorded a live version of "Slide" at Vevo's New York City studios. She performed the song alongside a keyboardist, a bassist and a percussionist. It was published on December 17, 2019.

She performed "Slide" while playing the guitar during an episode of Late Night with Seth Meyers aired in January 2020. YG's verse was replaced by an instrumental intro played by H.E.R.'s drummer and bassist.

== Remix ==
"Slide (Remix)"

Single by H.E.R. featuring Pop Smoke, A Boogie wit da Hoodie and Chris Brown
- Released: January 15, 2020
- Genre: R&B; hip hop
- Length: 4:56
- Label: RCA
- Songwriters: Charles Carter; Elijah Dias; Gabriella Wilson; Chris Brown; Jermaine Dupri; Keenon Daequan Ray Jackson; Roger Parker; Ron Latour; Shawn Carter; Steven Arrington; Tiara Thomas; Waung Hankerson
- Producer: Cardo

The official remix featuring Pop Smoke, A Boogie wit da Hoodie and Chris Brown instead of YG was released on January 15, 2020. It features the same base instrumental as the original version with three additional verses performed by Pop Smoke, A Boogie wit da Hoodie and Chris Brown.

The remix peaked at 32 on New Zealand's Hot 40 Singles chart.

== Personnel ==
Credits adapted from Tidal.

- H.E.R. – associated performer, composer, lyricist
- YG – associated performer, composer, lyricist
- Cardo – producer, composer, lyricist
- Charles Carter – composer, lyricist
- Elijah Dias – composer, lyricist
- Jermaine Dupri – composer, lyricist
- Roger Parker – composer, lyricist
- Shawn Carter – composer, lyricist
- Steven Arrington – composer, lyricist
- Tiara Thomas – composer, lyricist
- Waung Hankerson – composer, lyricist
- Dave Kutch – mastering engineer
- Jaycen Joshua – mixing engineer
- Dee Brown – recording engineer
- Miki Tsutsumi – engineer
- Alex Pyle – assistant engineer
- Ayana Depas – assistant engineer
- DJ Riggins – assistant engineer
- Jacob Richards – assistant engineer
- Lou Carrao – assistant engineer
- Mike Seaberg – assistant engineer

== Charts ==
=== Weekly charts ===
Weekly chart performance for "Slide"
Chart (2019–20)	Peak position
New Zealand Hot Singles (RMNZ)	23
New Zealand Hot Singles (RMNZ) Pop Smoke, A Boogie wit da Hoodie and Chris Brown remix	32
US Billboard Hot 100	43
US Hot R&B/Hip-Hop Songs (Billboard)	16
US Rhythmic Airplay (Billboard)	3
US Rolling Stone Top 100	77

=== Year-end charts ===
2020 year-end chart performance for "Slide"
Chart (2020)	Position
US Billboard Hot 100	99
US Hot R&B/Hip-Hop Songs (Billboard)	43
US Rhythmic (Billboard)	15

== Certifications ==
Sales and certifications for "Slide"
Region	Certification	Certified units/sales
Brazil (Pro-Música Brasil)	Platinum	40,000^{‡}
Canada (Music Canada)	2× Platinum	160,000^{‡}
New Zealand (RMNZ)	2× Platinum	60,000^{‡}
United Kingdom (BPI) Remix version	Silver	200,000^{‡}
United States (RIAA)	3× Platinum	3,000,000^{‡}
^{‡} Sales+streaming figures based on certification alone.
