= Lucky Daye discography =

Discography

- Studio albums: 3
- EPs: 1
- Singles: 11
- Guest appearances: 46

Lucky Daye is a Grammy winning R&B singer-songwriter from New Orleans, Louisiana.

In 2019 Lucky Daye, born David Debrandon Brown, released his first studio album Painted, followed by his Grammy winning EP Table for Two in 2021 and his critically acclaimed second album Candydrip in 2022. Most recently, Lucky released his third studio album, Algorithm, on June 28th, 2024. He has written songs for many artists, most notably Boyz II Men, Joe, August Alsina, Mary J. Blige, Keith Sweat, Ingrid Andress, Beyonce, Ne-Yo, Zayn, and Ella Mai.

== Albums ==
Title	Album details	Peak chart positions	
Title	Album details	US	US Heat.
Painted	Released: May 24, 2019; Label: Keep Cool, RCA; Format: Streaming, digital download, CD, LP	—	15
Candydrip	Released: March 10, 2022; Label: Keep Cool, RCA; Format: Streaming, digital download, CD, LP	69	—
Algorithm	Released: June 28, 2024; Label: Keep Cool, RCA; Format: Streaming, digital download, CD, LP	—	—
ALOUD!	Released: October 16, 2026; Label: Warner Records; Format: Streaming, digital download, CD, LP	—	—

== Extended plays ==
Title	EP details	Peak chart positions	
Title	EP details	US	US Heat.
Table for Two	Released: February 12, 2021; Label: Keep Cool / RCA; Format: Digital download	96	6

== Singles ==
Title	Year	Peak chart positions						Album
Title	Year	US	CAN	JAM Air.	NZ Hot	ZAF Stream.	WW	Album
"Roll Some Mo"	2018	—	—	8	—	—	—	Painted
"Karma"	2019	—	—	*	—	—	—	Painted
"Love You Too Much"	2019	—	—	*	—	—	—	Painted
"Buying Time"	2019	—	—	*	—	—	—	Non-album singles
"Fly"	2019	—	—	*	—	—	—	Non-album singles
"All About You" (with Leon Bridges)	2020	—	—	*	—	—	—	Non-album singles
"Feed the Fire" (with SG Lewis)	2020	—	—	*	—	—	—	Times
"On Read" (with Tiana Major9)	2021	—	—	*	—	—	—	Table for Two
"How Much Can a Heart Take" (with Yebba)	2021	—	—	*	—	—	—	Table for Two
"Running Blind"	2021	—	—	*	—	—	—	Liberated / Music for the Movement Vol. 3
"Over"	2021	77	80	*	17	58	109	Candydrip
"Candy Drip"	2022	—	—	*	—	—	—	Candydrip
"NWA"	2022	—	—	*	—	—	—	Candydrip
"Fuckin' Sound"	2022	—	—	*	—	—	—	Candydrip
"That's You"	2023	—	—	*	27	—	—	Algorithm
"Hericane"	2024	—	—	*	—	—	—	Algorithm
"Soft"	2024	—	—	*	—	—	—	Algorithm
"—" denotes a recording that did not chart or was not released in that territory. "*" denotes that the chart did not exist at that time.

== Guest appearances ==
List of non-single guest appearances, with other performing artists, showing year released and album name
Title	Year	Other artist(s)	Album
"Little More Time"	2018	Victoria Monét	Painted (Deluxe Edition)
"Regular People"	2019	Mahalia, Hamzaa	Love and Compromise
"Fly"	2019	—N/a	Mark Ronson Presents the Music of Spies in Disguise
"Can You Blame Me"	2020	Kehlani	It Was Good Until It Wasn't
"Faces"	2020	Buddy	—N/a
"All About You"	2020	Leon Bridges	—N/a
"Dream"	2020	Queen Naija	Table For Two
"Feed The Fire"	2020	SG Lewis	Times
"Velvet (Remix)"	2020	KIRBY	Insecure: Music from the HBO Original Series, Season 4
"Forfeit."	2020	Kiana Ledé	Kiki
"Cupid"	2020	Spillage Village, EarthGang, 6lack	Spilligion
"Fade Away"	2020	—N/a	The Photograph (Original Motion Picture Soundtrack)
"I Just Wanna Live"	2020	Keedron Bryant, Andra Day, IDK	
"Look Easy"	2020	Kaytranada	—N/a
"Be Thankful for What You've Got"	2020	Big Freedia, BJRNCK	Stand Up
"Anymore"	2021	Sinéad Harnett	Ready Is Always Too Late
"You Want My Love"	2021	Earth, Wind & Fire	
"Sinner"	2021	Adekunle Gold	Catch Me If You Can
"Good Luck"	2021	Nao	And Then Life Was Beautiful
"Come for Me (Unlocked)"	2021	Alicia Keys, Khalid	KEYS
"Puerto Rico"	2021	IDK	USee4Yourself
"Feelz"	2021	Sevyn Streeter	Drunken Wordz Sober Thoughts
"Retrograde"	2021	Khalid, 6lack	Scenic Drive
"Good and Plenty (Remix)"	2021	Alex Isley, Masego	—N/a
"Make You Feel Good"	2021	BJ The Chicago Kid	—N/a
Slow Down (Remix)	2021	VanJess	Homegrown (Deluxe)
Running Blind	2021	—N/a	Liberated / Music for the Movement Vol. 3
"Star"	2022	Megan Thee Stallion	Traumazine
CYBAH	2022	Syd	Broken Hearts Club
"Too Much"	2022	Mark Ronson	—N/a
"Bag"	2022	Col3trane	Lush Life
"Next To Me"	2022	Jim-E Stack	N/A
"A Mess"	2022	Ella Mai	Heart on My Sleeve
"Modennaminute"	2022	Smino, Phoelix	Luv 4 Rent
"Boy Bye"	2022	Ari Lennox	Age/Sex/Location
"Vibe Like This"	2022	SG Lewis, Ty Dolla Sign	AudioLust & Higher Love
"Stay"	2022	Alicia Keys	KEYS II
"Solitude"	2022	Snakehips, Bia	Never Worry
"Your Love Is Dangerous"	2022	Yung Bleu	Tantra
"Worth the Wait"	2022	Lakeyah	No Pressure (Pt. 2)
"Heartbreak Hotel"	2022	Whitney Houston	I Wanna Dance with Somebody
"Smoke"	2023	Victoria Monét	Jaguar II
"Good for Now"	2023	Chiiild	Better Luck in the Next Life
"Is This Real Love" (remix)	2023	Debbie	—N/a
"Careful"	2023	—N/a	Magic Mike's Last Dance
"Clarity"	2023	MAETA	When I Hear Your Name
"When He's Not There"	2024	Kehlani	While We Wait 2
"Cotton Candy Blvd"	2025	India Shawn	—N/a
"Frequency"	2025	D Smoke	—N/a
"Make A Baby"	2025	Tori Kelly	—N/a
"Hard Part"	2025	Teyana Taylor	Escape Room
"Isn't It Obvious (Remix)"	2025	Alessia Cara	Love & Hyperbole
"Tonight"	2026	Darhyl Camper	"Campilation"
"Move"	2026	Tank and the Bangas	The Last Balloon
"Slow Jamz"	2026	Chris Brown	Brown
"Still Be Mine"	2026	Rory, Blk Odyssy	--

== Songwriting discography ==
List of songwriting credits (excluding guest appearances, interpolations, and samples)
Track(s)	Year	Credit	Artist(s)	Album
"She's Got Her Own"	2008	Songwriter	Ne-Yo (with Jamie Foxx)	Year of the Gentleman
"Girl of My Dreams"	2008	Songwriter	Keith Sweat	Just Me
"Me and My Girl"	2008	Songwriter	Keith Sweat	Just Me
"Love You Better (with Keyshia Cole)	2008	Songwriter	Keith Sweat	Just Me
"Make that Sound"	2009	Songwriter	J. Holiday	Round 2
"Lights Out"	2009	Songwriter	J. Holiday	Round 2
"Goner"	2009	Songwriter	Ghostface Killah (with Lloyd)	Ghostdini: Wizard of Poetry in Emerald City
“Test Drive”	2010	Songwriter	Keith Sweat (with Joe (singer))	Ridin' Solo
"All Around The World"	2010	Songwriter	Loick Essien	N/A
"Impossible"	2012	Songwriter	Joe	The Good, The Bad, The Sexy
"Say Yes"	2013	Songwriter	B5	N/A
"Believe Us"	2014	Songwriter	Boyz II Men	Collide
"Yes"	2014	Songwriter	Michelle Williams	Journey to Freedom
"Free"	2014	Songwriter	Michelle Williams	Journey to Freedom
"Everything"	2014	Songwriter	Michelle Williams	Journey to Freedom
“No Love”	2014	Songwriter	August Alsina	Testimony
"Ah Yeah"	2014	Songwriter	August Alsina	Testimony
“Mama”	2014	Songwriter	August Alsina	Testimony
"Bad Mothafucka"	2014	Songwriter	August Alsina	The Product III: State of Emergency
"What I've Waited For"	2014	Songwriter	Vicetone (with D. Brown)	N/A
“The Truth”	2015	Songwriter	Mya	Love Elevation Suite (EP)
"Enemiez"	2016	Songwriter	Keke Palmer	N/A
"10,000 Hours"	2016	Songwriter	Ella Mai	Change (EP)
"Down"	2016	Songwriter	Ella Mai	Change (EP)
"Don't Want You"	2016	Songwriter	Ella Mai	Time (EP)
"No Rush"	2016	Songwriter	Ella Mai	N/A
"Song Goes Off"	2017	Songwriter	Trey Songz	Tremaine the Album
"Love Yourself"	2017	Songwriter	Mary J. Blige	Strength of a Woman
"U + Me (Love Session)"	2017	Songwriter	Mary J. Blige	Strength of a Woman
"Thick of It"	2017	Songwriter (background vocals)	Mary J. Blige	Strength of a Woman
"Own It"	2018	Songwriter	Ella Mai	Ella Mai
"Dirty Mind"	2018	Songwriter	Albert Stanaj (with Ty Dolla Sign)	N/A
"Real Friends"	2018	Songwriter	PRETTYMUCH	N/A
“Only Love”	2018	Songwriter	Mary J. Blige	N/A
"Bounce Back 2.0"	2018	Songwriter	Mary J. Blige	N/A
“Paradise”	2018	Songwriter	Hotshot (band)	Early Flowering- EP
“LaLaLa”	2019	Songwriter	Black Coffee (DJ) (with Usher)	N/A
"Tell Your Friends"	2019	Songwriter	Liam Payne	LP1
"Pretend"	2019	Songwriter	CNCO	N/A
"Fool"	2019	Songwriter	NCT 127	We Are Superhuman
“Ya Ya Ya”	2019	Songwriter	Exo	Obsession
"Purpose (Stripped)"	2019	Songwriter	Etham	N/A
"Who Your Are"	2020	Songwriter	Luke James	to feel lov/d
"Traveling"	2020	Songwriter	Luke James	to feel lov/d
“Better”	2020	Songwriter	Zayn Malik	N/A
"Better Days"	2020	Songwriter (Background vocals)	Ant Clemons and Justin Timberlake	N/A
“Wishful Drinking”	2021	Songwriter	Ingrid Andress (with Sam Hunt)	Good Person
"Que Wea"	2021	Songwriter	Paloma Mami	Sueños de Dalí
"Fire & Ice"	2021	Songwriter (Background vocals)	Wale	Folarin II
“Alien Superstar”	2022	Songwriter	Beyoncé	Renaissance
“Good Morning Gorgeous”	2022	Songwriter	Mary J. Blige	Good Morning Gorgeous
"Tables"	2022	Songwriter	Natalie La Rose	N/A
"Defibrillator"	2022	Songwriter (Background Vocals)	Smino	Luv 4 Rent
"Who Cares Anyways"	2023	Songwriter	Masego	Masego
"Through the Night"	2023	Songwriter	Maeta (with Free Nationals)	When I Hear Your Name (EP)
"Regret It"	2023	Songwriter	Exo	Exist
"Please U"	2024	Songwriter	Usher (musician)	Coming Home
"Guitar Lady"	2024	Songwriter	Brittney Spencer	My Stupid Life (Deluxe)
"Forty One Winks"	2024	Songwriter	Tomorrow X Together	The Star Chapter: Sanctuary
"Preach"	2025	Songwriter	TA Thomas	–
"Letting You Run"	2025	Songwriter	Jack Dine, Tone Stith	–
"Baccarat"	2025	Songwriter	Leon Thomas	PHOLKS (EP)

== See also ==
- List of hip hop musicians
- List of R&B musicians
- List of awards and nominations for American Idol contestants
