= List of awards and nominations for American Idol contestants =

This is a list of major award wins and nominations given to American Idol contestants.

== Season 1 ==
=== Kelly Clarkson ===
(Note: Kelly Clarkson is the only winner to halfway complete the EGOT with Grammy and Emmy wins.)

- ASCAP Pop Music Awards
  - 2004: Song Writer Award – "Miss Independent": won
  - 2007: Song of The Year Award – "Because of You": won
    - Most Performed Songs of The Year: won
  - 2010: Most Performed Songs of The Year: won
- ACM Awards
  - 2008: Vocal Event of the Year – "Because of You" (with Reba McEntire): nominated
  - 2012: Single of the Year – "Don't You Wanna Stay" (with Jason Aldean): won
    - Vocal Event of the Year – "Don't You Wanna Stay" (with Jason Aldean): won
  - 2013: Vocal Event of the Year – "Don't Rush" (with Vince Gill): nominated
  - 2019: Music Event of the Year – "Keeping Score" (with Dan + Shay): nominated
- American Country Awards
  - 2011: Single of the Year: Vocal Collaboration – "Don't You Wanna Stay" (with Jason Aldean): won
    - Music Video: Duo, Group, or Collaboration – "Don't You Wanna Stay": won
- American Music Awards
  - 2003: Favorite Pop/Rock New Artist: nominated
  - 2005: Favorite Pop/Rock Album – Breakaway: nominated
    - Favorite Pop/Rock Female Artist: nominated
    - T-Mobile Text-In Award (Artist of the Year): won
    - Favorite Adult Contemporary Artist: won
  - 2006: Favorite Adult Contemporary Artist: won
    - Favorite Pop/Rock Female Artist: won
  - 2012: Favorite Pop/Rock Female Artist: nominated
    - Favorite Adult Contemporary Artist: nominated
- Billboard Awards
  - 2005: Hot 100 Artist of the Year: nominated
    - Female Billboard 200 Female: nominated
    - Hot 100 Song of the Year – "Since U Been Gone": nominated
  - Hot 100 Airplay of the Year – "Since U Been Gone": nominated
    - Hot Digital Song – "Since U Been Gone": nominated
- BRIT Awards
  - 2006: Best Pop Act: nominated
    - Best International Female Artist: nominated
- Country Music Association Awards
  - 2007: Musical Event of the Year – "Because of You" (with Reba McEntire): nominated
  - 2011: Single of the Year – "Don't You Wanna Stay" (with Jason Aldean): nominated
    - Musical Event of the Year – "Don't You Wanna Stay" (with Jason Aldean): won
  - 2012: Female Vocalist of the Year: nominated
  - 2013: Female Vocalist of the Year: nominated
    - Musical Event of the Year – "Don't Rush": nominated
- CMT Music Awards
  - 2008: Collaborative Video of the Year – "Because of You" (with Reba McEntire): nominated
  - 2011: Collaborative Video of the Year – "Don't You Wanna Stay" (with Jason Aldean): nominated
  - 2012: Collaborative Video of the Year – "Don't Rush" (with Vince Gill): nominated
- Critics' Choice Real TV Awards
  - 2022: Female Star of the Year: nominated
- Critics' Choice Television Award
  - 2020: Best Talk Show – The Kelly Clarkson Show: nominated
  - 2021: Best Talk Show – The Kelly Clarkson Show: nominated
  - 2022: Best Talk Show – The Kelly Clarkson Show: nominated
  - 2023: Best Talk Show – The Kelly Clarkson Show: nominated
  - 2024: Best Talk Show – The Kelly Clarkson Show: nominated
  - 2025: Best Talk Show – The Kelly Clarkson Show: nominated
- Daytime Emmy Awards
  - 2020: Outstanding Talk Show Entertainment – The Kelly Clarkson Show: nominated
    - Outstanding Entertainment Talk Show Host: won
  - 2021: Outstanding Talk Show Entertainment – The Kelly Clarkson Show: won
    - Outstanding Entertainment Talk Show Host: won
    - Outstanding Original Song – "Cabana Boy Troy": nominated
  - 2022: Outstanding Talk Show Entertainment – The Kelly Clarkson Show: won
    - Outstanding Entertainment Talk Show Host: won
  - 2023: Outstanding Daytime Talk Series – The Kelly Clarkson Show: won
    - Outstanding Daytime Talk Series Host: won
  - 2024: Outstanding Daytime Talk Series – The Kelly Clarkson Show: won
    - Outstanding Daytime Talk Series Host: nom
  - 2025: Outstanding Daytime Talk Series – The Kelly Clarkson Show: nominated
    - Outstanding Daytime Talk Series Host: nominated
  - 2026: Outstanding Daytime Talk Series – The Kelly Clarkson Show: won
    - Outstanding Daytime Talk Series Host: nominated
- Dorian Awards
  - 2016: TV Musical Performance of the Year – "Piece By Piece": nominated
- Echo Awards
  - 2007: Best International Pop/Rock Female Artist:
- GLAAD Media Award
  - 2023: Outstanding Variety or Talk Show Episode – The Kelly Clarkson Show: nominated
  - 2024: Outstanding Variety or Talk Show Episode – The Kelly Clarkson Show: nominated
- Golden Raspberry Awards
  - 2003: Worst Actress – From Justin to Kelly: nominated
    - Worst Screen Couple – From Justin to Kelly (with Justin Guarini): nominated
- Gracie Awards
  - 2021: Best Talk Show: Entertainment – The Kelly Clarkson Show: won
  - 2024: Best Talk Show: Entertainment – The Kelly Clarkson Show: won
- Grammy Awards
  - 2004: Best Female Pop Vocal Performance – "Miss Independent": nominated
  - 2006: Best Pop Album -Breakaway: won
    - Best Female Pop Vocal Performance – "Since U Been Gone": won
  - 2008: Best Country Collaboration – "Because of You" (with Reba McEntire): nominated
  - 2010: Best Pop Album – All I Ever Wanted: nominated
  - 2012: Best Country Duo/Group Performance – "Don't You Wanna Stay" (with Jason Aldean): nominated
  - 2013: Record of the Year – "Stronger (What Doesn't Kill You)": nominated
    - Best Pop Solo Vocal Performance – "Stronger (What Doesn't Kill You)": nominated
    - Best Pop Vocal Album – Stronger: won
  - 2014: Best Country Duo or Group Performance – "Don't Rush" (with Vince Gill): nominated
  - 2016: Best Pop Solo Vocal Performance – "Heartbeat Song": nominated
    - Best Pop Vocal Album – Piece by Piece: nominated
  - 2017: Best Pop Solo Performance – "Piece by Piece (Idol Version)": nominated
  - 2018: Best Pop Solo Performance – "Love So Soft": nominated
  - 2019: Best Pop Vocal Album – Meaning of Life: nominated
  - 2023: Best Traditional Pop Vocal Album – When Christmas Comes Around...: nominated
  - 2024: Best Pop Vocal Album – Chemistry: nominated
- iHeartRadio Music Awards
  - 2016: Best Cover Song – "Bitch Better Have My Money": nominated
  - 2017: Best Cover Song – "Love on the Brain": nominated
- International Dance Music Awards
  - 2006: Best Pop Dance Track – "Since U Been Gone": nominated
- Juno Awards
  - 2006: International Album of the Year: "Breakaway": nominated
- LOS40 Music Awards
  - 2006: Best International New Artist: nominated
- Los Premios MTV Latinoamérica
  - 2005: Best International Pop Artist: nominated
    - Best New International Artist: nominated
  - 2006: Best International Pop Artist: nominated
- Meteor Ireland Music Awards
  - 2006: Best International Female: nominated
- MTV Asia Awards
  - 2006: Favorite Female Artist: won
- MTV Australian Video Music Awards
  - 2006: Best Female Artist: nominated
    - Best Pop Video – "Because of You": nominated
- MTV Movie & TV Awards
  - 2022: Best Talk/Topical Show – The Kelly Clarkson Show: nominated
    - Best Host: won
  - 2023: Best Host: nominated
- MTV Video Music Awards
  - 2003: Best Pop Video – "Miss Independent": nominated
    - Best New Artist – "Miss Independent": nominated
    - Viewer's Choice Award – "Miss Independent": nominated
  - 2005: Best Female Video – "Since U Been Gone": won
    - Best Pop Video – "Since U Been Gone": won
    - Viewer's Choice Award – "Since U Been Gone": nominated
  - 2006: Best Female Video – "Because of You": won
    - Viewer's Choice Award – "Because of You": nominated
  - 2009: Best Female Video – "My Life Would Suck Without You": nominated
  - 2012: Best Video with a Message – "Dark Side": nominated
  - 2013: Best Video with a Social Message – "People Like Us": nominated
- MTV Video Music Awards Latin America
  - 2005: Best New International Artist: nominated
    - Best International Pop Artist: nominated
  - 2006: Best International Artist: nominated
- MuchMusic Video Awards
  - 2006: Best International Video – "Behind These Hazel Eyes": nominated
  - 2009: Best International Video – "My Life Would Suck Without You": nominated
  - 2011: International Video of the Year – "Stronger (What Doesn't Kill You)": nominated
    - Most streamed Video of the Year – "Mr. Know It All": nominated
    - People's Choice: Favorite International Artist – "Because of You": won
- Nickelodeon Kids' Choice Awards
  - 2006: Favorite Female Singer: won
  - 2019: Favorite TV Judges – The Voice: nominated
- Nickelodeon HALO Awards
  - 2017: HALO Hall of Fame: won
- OFM Awards
  - 2016: International Song of the Year: – "Second Hand Heart" (with Ben Haenow): won
- People's Choice Awards
  - 2006: Favorite Female Performer: won
  - 2006: Best Smile: won
  - 2016: Favorite Pop Artist: nominated
  - 2020: The Daytime Talk Show of 2020 – The Kelly Clarkson Show: nominated
  - 2021: The Daytime Talk Show of 2021 – The Kelly Clarkson Show: nominated
  - 2022: The Daytime Talk Show of 2022 – The Kelly Clarkson Show: won
  - 2024: The Daytime Talk Show – The Kelly Clarkson Show: won
- Pollstar Awards
  - 2008: Most Creative Tour Package – 2 Worlds 2 Voices Tour: nominated
- Premios Oye!
  - 2006: English Song of the Year – "Because of You": nominated
- Queerty Awards
  - 2013: Anthem of the Year - "People Like Us": nominated
- Radio Disney Music Awards
  - 2003: Best Song That Makes You Turn Up the Radio – "Miss Independent": nominated
    - Best Video That Rocks – "Miss Independent": nominated
    - Best Song to Sing Hairbrush Karaoke – "Miss Independent": won
  - 2004: Best Homework Song: – "Breakaway": nominated
    - Best Song to Air Guitars – "Breakaway": nominated
    - Best Video That Rocks – "Breakaway": nominated
  - 2006: Best Female Artist: nominated
    - Best Song You've Heard a Million Times and Still Love – "Since U Been Gone": won
  - 2007: Best Female Artist: nominated
    - Best Top 40 Artist: nominated
    - Best Song to Dance to – "Never Again": nominated
    - Best Song to Wake Up to – "Never Again": nominated
    - Best Song to Sing to an Ex – "Never Again": nominated
  - 2018: Icon Award: won
- Radio Music Awards
  - 2003: Song Of The Year / Top 40 Radio – "Miss Independent": nominated
    - Best Driving Song – "Miss Independent": nominated
  - 2005: Song Of The Year / Adult Hit Radio – "Breakaway": nominated
    - Song Of The Year / Mainstream Hit Radio – "Since U Been Gone": nominated
    - Song Of The Year / Mainstream Hit Radio – "Behind These Hazel Eyes": nominated
    - Artist Of The Year / Mainstream Hit Radio: won
- The Record of the Year
  - 2005: Choice Love Song: "Since U Been Gone": : nominated
- Teen Choice Awards
  - 2003: Choice Love Song: "A Moment Like This": nominated
    - Choice Breakout Artist: nominated
    - Choice Female Music Artist: won
    - Choice Music Crossover: nominated
    - Choice Movie Chemistry for From Justin to Kelly: nominated
    - Choice Breakout Female Actress for From Justin to Kelly: nominated
  - 2005: Choice Album – Breakaway: won
    - Choice Female Artist: won
    - Choice Single -"Since U Been Gone": won
    - Choice Summer Song – "Behind These Hazel Eyes": won
  - 2006: Choice Female Artist: won
    - Choice Music Single – "Walk Away": nominated
  - 2007: Choice Payback Song – "Never Again": nominated
  - 2009: Choice Music Single – "My Life Would Suck Without You": nominated
  - 2010: Choice Idol Alum: nominated
  - 2012: Choice Music Single: Female – "Stronger (What Doesn't Kill You)": nominated
    - Choice Break Up Song – "Stronger (What Doesn't Kill You)": nominated
  - 2015: Choice Music Single: Female – "Heartbeat Song: nominated
  - 2018: Choice TV Personality – The Voice: nominated
  - 2019: Choice Movie Song – "Broken & Beautiful": nominated
- TMF Awards (Belgium)
  - 2006: Best Pop International: won
    - Best Female Pop International: won
- TRL Awards
  - 2006: TRL's 1st Lady: nominated
    - Countdown Killer: won
- XM Nation Music Awards
  - 2005: Dashboard Anthem Best Pop Sing-Along – "Since U Been Gone": nominated
    - Pop Artist of the Year: nominated
- World Music Awards
  - 2003: Best New Female Artist: nominated
  - 2005: World's Best-Selling Pop Female Artist: nominated
  - 2013: World's Best Female Artist: nominated
    - World's Best Entertainer of the Year: nominated
- Women's World Award
  - 2009: World Entertainment Award: won

=== Tamyra Gray ===
- Teen Choice Awards
  - 2003: Tamyra Gray: Choice Female Television Breakout Star for Boston Public: nominated

== Season 2 ==
=== Ruben Studdard ===
- American Music Awards
  - 2004: Favorite Male R&B Artist: nominated
- BET Awards
  - 2004:
    - Best Male R&B Artist: nominated
    - Best New Artist: nominated
  - 2005: Best Gospel Artist: nominated
- Billboard Music Awards
  - 2003:
    - Top R&B/Hip-Hop Sales Single – "Superstar/Flying Without Wings"
    - Top Gospel Artist
    - Top Gospel Album – I Need an Angel
- Grammy Awards
  - 2004: Best Male R&B Vocal Performance – "Superstar": nominated
- Image Awards
  - 2004:
    - Outstanding Male Artist: nominated
    - Outstanding New Artist: won
- Soul Train Awards
  - 2004: Best New R&B/Soul or Rap New Artist: "Superstar": nominated
- Teen Choice Awards
  - 2003: Choice Male Reality/Variety Star for American Idol: won

=== Clay Aiken ===
- American Music Awards
  - 2004:
    - Favorite Pop/Rock Male Artist: nominated
    - Fan Choice Award: won
- American Christian Music Awards
  - 2005: Outstanding Yule CD – Merry Christmas with Love: won
- Billboard Awards
  - 2003: Best Selling Single of 2003 – "Bridge over Troubled Water/This Is the Night"
  - 2004: Best Selling Christmas Album – Merry Christmas with Love
  - 2005: Best Selling Christian Album – Merry Christmas with Love
- Teen Choice Awards
  - 2003: Choice Male Reality/Variety Star for American Idol: nominated

=== Kimberley Locke ===
- Teen Choice Awards
  - 2003: Choice Female Reality/Variety Star for American Idol: nominated

=== Josh Gracin ===
- Academy of Country Music
  - 2005: Top New Vocalist: nominated
- CMT Music Awards
  - 2005: Breakthrough Video of the Year – "I Want to Live": nominated

=== Carmen Rasmussen ===
- New Music Weekly Awards
  - 2005: Carmen Rasmusen: New Country Artist of the Year: won

=== Kimberly Caldwell ===
- Teen Choice Awards
  - 2003: Choice Female Reality/Variety Star for American Idol: nominated

== Season 3 ==
=== Fantasia Barrino ===
- American Music Awards
  - 2005: Favorite Female R&B Artist: nominated
    - Favorite R&B/Soul Album – Free Yourself: nominated
  - 2007: Favorite Female R&B Artist: nominated
- Astra Film and Creative Awards
- 2024: Best Actress – The Color Purple: pending
  - Best Cast Ensemble – The Color Purple: pending
- Barbados Music Awards
  - 2010: International Award of Excellence: won
- BAFTA Film Award
  - 2024: Best Actress in a Leading Role – The Color Purple: nominated
- BET Awards
  - 2005: Best New Artist: nominated
    - Best Female R&B Artist: nominated
  - 2013: Centric Award – "Lose to Win"
  - 2017: Centric Award – "Sleeping with the One I Love"
    - Best Gospel/Inspirational Award – "I Made It" with Tye Tribbett)
- Billboard Awards
  - 2004: Top Hot 100 Single Sales – "I Believe": won
    - Top R&B/Hip-Hop Sales Single – "I Believe": won
  - 2005: Top New R&B/Hip-Hop Artist
    - Top Hot Adult R&B Artist
- Billboard American Urban Radio Networks
  - 2005: Top R&B/Hip-Hop Single – "I Believe": won
- Broadway.com Awards
  - 2007: Favorite Female Replacement – The Color Purple: won
- Celebration of Cinema and Television
- 2023: Ensemble Award-Film – The Color Purple: won
- Critics' Choice Movie Awards
- 2024: Best Acting Ensemble – The Color Purple: pending
- Elle Women in Hollywood Award
  - 2023: Women in Hollywood Award – The Color Purple: won
- Emmis Communications/Hot-97 "KISS-FM"
  - 2005: Phenomenal Woman Award: won
- Greensboro sit-ins Organization
  - 2008: Founder's Appreciation Award: won
- Golden Globe Awards
- 2024: Best Actress in a Motion Picture – Comedy or Musical – The Color Purple: nominated
- Grammy Awards
  - 2006: Best Female R&B Vocal Performance – "Free Yourself": nominated
    - Best R&B Album – Free Yourself: Nominated
    - Best Traditional R&B Vocal Performance – "Summertime": nominated
  - 2008: Best Female R&B Vocal Performance – "When I See U": nominated
    - Best Contemporary R&B Album – Fantasia: nominated
  - 2009: Best R&B Performance By A Duo Or Group With Vocals – "I'm His Only Woman" (with Jennifer Hudson): nominated
  - 2011: Best R&B Album –Back to Me: nominated
    - Best R&B Vocal Performance – "Bittersweet": won
  - 2014: Best Urban Contemporary Album – Side Effects Of You nominated
    - Best R&B Song – "Without Me" (featuring Kelly Rowland and Missy Elliott)": nominated
    - Best Traditional R&B Performance – "Get It Right": nominated
  - 2017: Best Traditional R&B Performance – "Sleeping with the One I Love": nominated
- Grammy Producers Brunch
  - 2013: BOE Global Artist Award: Honoree
- NAACP Image Awards
  - 2005: Outstanding Female Artist: won
  - 2007: Outstanding Female Artist: nominated
    - Outstanding Actress in a Mini-Series/T.V. Movie – The Fantasia Barrino Story: Life Is Not a Fairytale: nominated
    - Outstanding Duo, Group or Collaboration – "Put You Up On Game": nominated
  - 2009: Outstanding Duo, Group or Collaboration – "I'm His Only Woman" (with Jennifer Hudson): nominated
  - 2011: Best R&B Song – "Bittersweet": won
  - 2024: Outstanding Ensemble Cast in a Motion Picture - The Color Purple: pending
    - Outstanding Actress in a Motion Picture – The Color Purple: pending
    - Entertainer of the Year – The Color Purple: pending
- NAACP Theatre Award
  - 2011: Distinguished Honoree: won
  - 2017: Outstanding Female Artist: nominated
  - 2020: Outstanding Female Artist: nominated
    - Outstanding Album – Sketchbook: nominated
- Las Vegas Film Critics Society
  - 2024: Best Ensemble – The Color Purple: pending
- People's Choice Awards
  - 2024: The Drama Movie Star – The Color Purple: nominated
- Satellite Awards
  - 2024: Best Actress in Motion Picture, Comedy or Musical – The Color Purple: pending
- Screen Actors Guild Awards
  - 2024: Outstanding Performance by a Cast in a Motion Picture – The Color Purple: nominated
- Soul Train Awards
  - 2005: Best New R&B/Soul or Rap Artist – "I Believe": nominated
  - 2006: Best Female R&B/Soul Album – Free Yourself: nominated
  - 2010: Record of the Year – "Bittersweet": nominated
    - Best Female R&B Soul Artist": nominated
  - 2013: Best R&B/Soul Female Artist: nominated
    - Album of the Year – Side Effects of You: nominated
    - Songwriter's Award - "Lose To Win": nominated
  - 2016: Best Female R&B/Soul Singer: nominated
  - 2020: Soul Train Certified Award: nominated
- Teen Choice Awards
  - 2004: Choice Female Reality/Variety Star for American Idol: nominated
  - 2005: Choice Female Breakout Artist:: nominated
    - Choice R&B Artist: nominated
- Theatre World Award
  - 2007: Outstanding Broadway Debut Performance – "The Color Purple": won
- Variety's Power of Women Awards
  - 2023: Power of Women Award - "The Color Purple": Honoree
- Vibe Music Awards
  - 2005: R&B Voice of the Year: nominated

=== Jasmine Trias ===
- MTV Pilipinas
  - 2006: Favorite Hip-Hop/R&B Video – "Lose Control": nominated

=== LaToya London ===
- NAACP Theater Awards
  - 2008: Best Supporting Female – Equity, The Color Purple: nominated

=== Jennifer Hudson ===
(Note: Jennifer Hudson is the first Idol alum to complete the EGOT)

- Academy Awards
  - 2007: Best Supporting Actress – Dreamgirls: won
- BAFTA
  - 2007: Actress in a Supporting Role – Dreamgirls: won
- BET Awards
  - 2007:
    - Best New Artist: won
    - Best Actress: won
    - Best Female R&B Artist: nominated
  - 2009:
    - Best Actress: nominated
    - Best Female R&B Artist: nominated
  - 2011: Best Female R&B Artist: nominated
- Billboard Awards
  - 2012: Top R&B Album – I Remember Me: nominated
- Black Reel Awards
  - 2006: Best Supporting Actress: Dreamgirls: won
    - Best Breakthrough Performance: Dreamgirls: won
  - 2008: Best Ensemble – The Secret Life of Bees: nominated
    - Best Actress – The Secret Life of Bees: nominated
  - 2024: Outstanding Variety, Sketch, or Talk – Series or Special – The Jennifer Hudson Show: nominated
- Daytime Emmy Awards
  - 2021: Outstanding Interactive Media for a Daytime Program - Baby Yoga: won
  - 2023: Outstanding Daytime Talk Series – The Jennifer Hudson Show: nominated
  - 2024: Outstanding Daytime Talk Series – The Jennifer Hudson Show: nominated
  - 2025: Outstanding Daytime Talk Series – The Jennifer Hudson Show: nominated
    - Outstanding Daytime Talk Series Host: nominated
  - 2026: Outstanding Daytime Talk Series Host: nominated
- GLAAD Media Awards
  - 2023: Outstanding Variety or Talk Show Episode – The Jennifer Hudson Show: nominated
  - 2024: Outstanding Variety or Talk Show Episode – The Jennifer Hudson Show: won
- Golden Globes
  - 2007:
    - Best Supporting Actress in a Motion Picture – Dreamgirls: won
    - Best Motion Picture (starring role) – Dreamgirls: won
- Grammy Awards
  - 2008: Best Original Soundtrack – Dreamgirls: nominated
  - 2009:
    - Best Female R&B Vocal Performance – "Spotlight": nominated
    - Best R&B Album – Jennifer Hudson: won
    - Best R&B Performance By A Duo Or Group With Vocals – "I'm His Only Woman" (with Fantasia): nominated
  - 2015: Best R&B Performance – "It's Your World": nominated
  - 2017: Best Musical Theater Album – The Color Purple: won
  - 2026: Best Traditional Pop Album – The Gift of Love: nominated
- Grio Awards
  - 2022:Trailblazer Icon Award: pending
- NAACP Image Awards
  - 2007: Best Supporting Actress in a Movie – Dreamgirls: won
  - 2009:
    - Outstanding New Artist: won
    - Outstanding Supporting Actress in a Movie – "The Secret Life of Bees": nominated
    - Outstanding Female Artist: nominated
    - Outstanding Duo, Group or Collaboration – "I'm His Only Woman" (with Fantasia Barrino): nominated
    - Outstanding Music Video – "Spotlight": nominated
    - Outstanding Song – "Spotlight": nominated
    - Outstanding Album: Jennifer Hudson: won
  - 2012:
    - Outstanding Female Artist: nominated
    - Outstanding Album – I Remember Me: won
    - Outstanding Music Video – "Where You At": won
  - 2014: Outstanding Actress in a Motion Picture – Winnie Mandela: nominated
  - 2015: Outstanding Female Artist: nominated
  - 2015: Outstanding Album – J-Hud: nominated
  - 2016: Outstanding Supporting Actress in a Motion Picture – "Chi-Raq": nominated
  - 2022: Entertainer of the Year: won
    - Outstanding Actress in a Motion Picture – Respect: won
  - 2023: Outstanding Host in a Talk or News / Information (Series or Special) – The Jennifer Hudson Show: won
  - 2024: Outstanding Talk Series – The Jennifer Hudson Show: won
  - 2025: Outstanding Talk Series – The Jennifer Hudson Show: won
    - Outstanding Host in a Talk or News / Information (Series or Special) – The Jennifer Hudson Show: won
- MTV Movie Awards
  - 2007: Best Performance – Dreamgirls: nominated
- Nickelodeon Kids' Choice Awards
  - 2019: Favorite TV Judges – The Voice: nominated
- People's Choice Awards
  - 2010: Choice R&B Artist: nominated
  - 2014: Favorite Humanitarian: won
  - 2015: Choice R&B Artist: nominated
  - 2022: The Daytime Talk Show of 2022 – The Jennifer Hudson Show: nominated
  - 2024: The Daytime Talk Show – The Jennifer Hudson Show: nominated
- Satellite Awards
  - 2007: Best Actress in a Supporting Role – Dreamgirls: won
- Screen Actors Guild Awards
  - 2007:
    - Outstanding Ensemble in a Motion Picture – Dreamgirls: nominated
    - Outstanding Supporting Actress in a Motion Picture – Dreamgirls: won
- Soul Train Awards
  - 2009:
    - Best R&B/Soul Female: nominated
    - Song of the Year – "Spotlight": nominated
- Teen Choice Awards
  - 2007: Choice Breakout Film Actress -Dreamgirls: nominated
    - Choice Film Actress Drama/Adventure – Dreamgirls: won
  - 2009: Choice Music R&B Artist: nominated
    - Choice Music R&B Single – "If It Isn't Love": nominated
  - 2010: Choice American Idol Alum: nominated
- Tony Awards
  - 2022: Best Musical – A Strange Loop: won

== Season 4 ==
=== Carrie Underwood ===
- ACM Awards
  - 2006: Top Female Vocalist: nominated
    - Top New Female Vocalist: won
    - Single Record of the Year – "Jesus, Take the Wheel": won
  - 2007: Single Record of the Year – "Before He Cheats": nominated
    - Song of the Year – "Before He Cheats": nominated
    - Album of the Year – Some Hearts: won
    - Top Female Vocalist: won
    - Video of the Year – "Before He Cheats": won
  - 2008: Top Female Vocalist: won
  - 2009: Entertainer of the Year: won
    - Top Female Vocalist: won
    - Video of the Year – "Just a Dream": nominated
    - Album of the Year – Carnival Ride: nominated
  - 2010: Entertainer of the Year: won
    - Triple Crown Award: won
    - Top Female Vocalist: nominated
    - Song of the Year (as artist and composer) – "Cowboy Casanova": nominated
    - Album of the Year – Play On, nominated
    - Vocal Event of the Year – "I Told You So (feat. Randy Travis): nominated
  - 2012: Top Female Vocalist: nominated
    - Vocal Event of the Year – "Remind Me" (with Brad Paisley): nominated
  - 2013: Top Female Vocalist: nominated
    - Album of the Year: Blown Away: nominated
  - 2014: Female Vocalist of the Year: nominated
    - Gene Weed Special Achievement Award: won
    - Video of the Year – "Two Black Cadillacs": nominated
  - 2015: Female Vocalist of the Year: nominated
    - Vocal Event of the Year – "Somethin' Bad" (with Miranda Lambert): nominated
    - Video of the Year – "Somethin' Bad" (with Miranda Lambert): nominated
  - 2016: Female Vocalist of the Year: nominated
  - 2017: Entertainer of the Year: nominated
    - Female Vocalist of the Year: nominated
  - 2018: Female Vocalist of the Year: nominated
    - Vocal Event of the Year – "The Fighter" (with Keith Urban): won
  - 2019: Female Vocalist of the Year: nominated
  - 2020: Entertainer of the Year: won (tied with Thomas Rhett)
    - Female Vocalist of the Year: nominated
  - 2021: Musical Event of the Year – "Hallelujah" (with John Legend): nominated
  - 2022: Entertainer of the Year: pending
    - Single of the Year – "If I Didn't Love You" — (with Jason Aldean): won
    - Video of the Year – "If I Didn't Love You" — (with Jason Aldean): nominated
    - Music Event of the Year – "If I Didn't Love You" — (with Jason Aldean): nominated
  - 2023:Entertainer of the Year – nominated
  - 2025: Visual Media – "I'm Gonna Love You" — (with Cody Johnson): pending
    - Music Event of the Year in "I'm Gonna Love You" — (with Cody Johnson): pending
- American Country Awards
  - 2010: Artist of the Year: won
    - Female Artist of the Year: won
    - Touring Artist of the Year – Play On Tour: won
    - Female Single of the Year – "Cowboy Casanova": won
    - Female Video of the Year – "Cowboy Casanova": won
    - Album of the Year – Play On: won
  - 2011: Female Artist of the Year: won
    - Touring Artist of the Year: nominated
    - Female Single of the Year – "Mama's Song": won
    - Female Music Video of the Year – "Mama's Song": won
  - 2012: Female Artist of the Year: won
    - Single by a Female Artist – "Good Girl": nominated
    - Single by a Vocal Collaboration – "Remind Me" (with Brad Paisley): won
    - Music Video by a Female Artist – "Good Girl": nominated
  - 2013: Female Artist of the Year: nominated
    - Touring Artist of the Year – Blown Away Tour: nominated
    - Female Single of the Year – "Two Black Cadillacs: nominated
    - Female Music Video of the Year – "Blown Away": won
- American Music Awards
  - 2006: Favorite Female Country Artist: nominated
    - Breakthrough Artist Award: won
  - 2007: Artist of the Year: won
    - Favorite Female Country Artist: won
    - Favorite Country Album – Some Hearts: won
  - 2008: Favorite Female Country Artist: nominated
    - Favorite Country Album – Carnival Ride: won
  - 2009: Favorite Female Country Artist: nominated
    - Favorite Female Country Artist: nominated
    - Favorite Country Album – Play On: won
  - 2012: Favorite Female Country Artist: nominated
    - Favorite Country Album – Blown Away: won
  - 2013: Favorite Female Country Artist: nominated
  - 2014: Favorite Female Country Artist: won
  - 2015: Favorite Female Country Artist: won
  - 2016: Artist of the Year: nominated
    - Favorite Female Country Artist: won
    - Favorite Country Album – Storyteller: won
  - 2017: Favorite Female Country Artist: won
  - 2018: Favorite Female Country Artist: won
  - 2019: Favorite Female Country Artist: won
    - Favorite Country Album – Cry Pretty: won
  - 2021: Favorite Female Country Artist: won
    - Favorite Inspirational Artist: won
  - 2022: Favorite Female Country Artist: nominated
    - Favorite Country Album – Denim & Rhinestones: nominated
- Billboard Music Awards
  - 2005: Top Hot 100 Single Sales – "Independence Day/Inside Your Heaven": won
  - 2006: Top Billboard 200 Album – Some Hearts: won
    - Top Country Album – Some Hearts: won
    - Top Country Album Artist (Female): won
    - Top New Country Artist: won
    - Top Hot Country Sales Artist: won
    - Top Country Artist – Female (Singles & Albums): won
    - Top Billboard 200 Album Artist: won
  - 2007: Top Billboard 200 Artist- Female: won
    - Top Country Album – Some Hearts: won
    - Top Country Album Artist (Female): won
    - Top Country Artist- Female (Singles & Albums): won'
    - Top Country Artist: won
  - 2008: Top Hot Country Songs Artist: won
  - 2013: Top Country Artist: nominated
    - Top Country Album – Blown Away: nominated
  - 2014: Milestone Award": won
  - 2015: Top Christian Song – "Something in the Water": won
  - 2016: Top Country Artist: nominated
  - 2016: Top Country Album - Storyteller: nominated
  - 2021: Top Female Country Artist nominated
    - Top Country Album - My Gift: nominated
    - Top Christian Album - My Gift: won
    - Top Christian Artist — nominated
  - 2022: Top Female Country Artist: pending
    - Top Country Song – "If I Didn't Love You" (with Jason Aldean)
    - Top Christian Artist: pending
    - Top Christian Album – My Gift: pending
- CMT Music Awards
  - 2006: Breakthrough Video of the Year – "Jesus Take the Wheel": won
    - Female Video of the Year -"Jesus Take the Wheel": won
    - Most Inspiring Video – "Jesus Take the Wheel": nominated
  - 2007: Video of the Year – "Before He Cheats": won
    - Female Video of the Year – "Before He Cheats": won
  - 2008: Video of the Year – "Wasted": nominated
    - Female Video of the Year – "Wasted": nominated
  - 2009: Video of the Year – "Just A Dream": nominated
  - 2010: Video of the Year – "Cowboy Casanova": won
    - CMT Performance of the Year – "Temporary Home" from CMT: Invitational Only: won
    - Female Video of the Year – "Cowboy Casanova": nominated
  - 2011: Video of the Year – "Undo It" nominated
    - Female Video of the Year – "Undo It": nominated
  - 2012: Video of the Year – "Good Girl": won
    - Video of the Year – "Remind Me" (with Brad Paisley): nominated
    - Female Video of the Year – "Good Girl": nominated
    - Collaborative Video of the Year – "Remind Me" (with Brad Paisley): won
    - CMT Performance of the Year – "Just a Dream"/"Dream On" (with Steven Tyler): nominated
  - 2013: Video of the Year: – "Blown Away": won
    - Female Video of the Year – "Two Black Cadillacs": nominated
  - 2014: Video of the Year – "See You Again": won
    - Female Video of the Year – "See You Again": nominated
  - 2015: Video of the Year – "Something' in the Water": won
    - Video of the Year – "Somethin' Bad" (with Miranda Lambert): nominated
    - Female Video of the Year – "Something in the Water": won
    - Female Video of the Year – "Little Toy Guns": nominated
    - Collaborative Video of the Year – "Somethin' Bad" (with Miranda Lambert): won
  - 2016: Video of the Year – "Smoke Break": nominated
    - Female Video of the Year: – "Smoke Break": won
  - 2017: Video of the Year – "Church Bells": nominated
    - Female Video of the Year – "Church Bells": won
    - Collaborative Video of the Year – "The Fighter" (with Keith Urban): won
  - 2018: Video of the Year – "The Champion" (with Ludacris): nominated
    - Female Video of the Year – "The Champion" (with Ludacris): won
    - Collaborative Video of the Year – "The Champion" (with Ludacris): nominated
    - CMT Performance of the Year – "The Fighter" (with Keith from the 2017 CMT Music Awards): nominated
  - 2019: Video of the Year – "Cry Pretty": won
    - Female Video of the Year – "Love Wins": won
  - 2020: Video of the Year – "Drinking Alone": won
    - Female Video of the Year – "Drinking Alone": won
  - 2021: Video of the Year – "Hallelujah" (with John Legend): won
    - Collaborative Video of the Year – "Hallelujah" (with John Legend): nominated
  - 2022: Video of the Year – "If I Didn't Love You" (with Jason Aldean): won
    - Collaborative of the Year – "If I Didn't Love You" (with Jason Aldean): won
  - 2023: Video of the Year – "Hate My Heart": nominated
    - Female Video of the Year – "Hate My Heart": nominated
  - 2024:CMT Performance of the Year – "Hate My Heart": nominated
- Canadian Country Music Awards
  - 2006: SOCAN Song of the Year – "Jesus Take The Wheel" won
- Country Music Association Awards
  - 2006: Horizon Award: won
    - Female Vocalist of the Year: won
  - 2007: Female Vocalist of the Year: won
    - Single of the Year – "Before He Cheats": won
    - Music Video of the Year – "Before He Cheats": nominated
    - Song Of The Year – "Before He Cheats": nominated
  - 2008: Female Vocalist of the Year: won
    - Album of the Year – Carnival Ride: nominated
  - 2009: Female Vocalist of the Year: nominated
    - Musical Event of the Year for – "I Told You So" (feat. Randy Travis): nominated
  - 2011: Female Vocalist of the Year: nominated
  - 2012: Female Vocalist of the Year: nominated
  - 2013: Female Vocalist of the Year: nominated
    - Album of the Year – Blown Away: nominated
    - Music Video of the Year – "Blown Away": nominated
  - 2014: Female Vocalist of the Year: nominated
    - Vocal Event of the Year – "Somethin' Bad" (with Miranda Lambert): nominated
    - Music Video of the Year – "Somethin' Bad" (with Miranda Lambert): nominated
  - 2015: Female Vocalist of the Year: nominated
  - 2016: Entertainer of the Year: nominated
    - Female Vocaliat of the Year: won
    - Album of the Year – Storyteller: nominated
  - 2017: Female Vocalist of the Year: nominated
  - 2018: Female Vocalist of the Year: won
    - Music Video of the a Year: "Cry Pretty": nominated
  - 2019: Entertainer of the Year: nominated
    - Female Vocalist of the Year: nominated
    - Album of the Year – Cry Pretty: nominated
  - 2020: Entertainer of the Year: nominated
    - Female Vocalist of the Year: nominated
  - 2021: Entertainer of the Year: nominated
  - 2022: Entertainer of the Year: nominated
    - Female Vocalist of the Year: nominated
    - Musical Event of the Year – "If I Didn't Love You" (with Jason Aldean): nominated
  - 2023: Entertainer of the Year: pending
- GMA Dove Awards
  - 2006: Country Recorded Song of the Year – "Jesus, Take the Wheel": won
  - 2021: Bluegrass/Country/Roots Albums – My Savior: nominated
    - Inspirational Record Song of the Year – "Great is Thy Faithfulness" (with CeCe Winans): won
- Golden Globes
  - 2011: Best Original Song – "There's a Place for Us" (with David Hodges & Hillary Lindsey): nominated
- Grammy Awards
  - 2007: Best New Artist: won
    - Best Female Country Vocal Performance – "Jesus, Take the Wheel": won
  - 2008: Best Female Country Vocal Performance – "Before He Cheats": won
    - Best Country Collaboration – "Oh Love": nominated
  - 2009: Best Female Country Vocal Performance – "Last Name": won
  - 2010: Best Female Country Vocal Performance – "Just A Dream": nominated
    - Best Country Collaboration with Vocals – "I Told You So" (with Randy Travis): won
  - 2011: Best Female Country Vocal Performance – "Temporary Home": nominated
  - 2012: Best Country Solo Performance – "Mama's Song": nominated
  - 2013: Best Country Solo Performance – "Blown Away": won
  - 2015: Best Country Solo Performance – "Something in the Water": won
    - Best Country Duo/Group Performance – "Somethin' Bad" (with Miranda Lambert): nominated
  - 2016: Best Country Solo Performance – "Little Toy Guns": nominated
  - 2017: Best Country Solo Performance – "Church Bells": nominated
  - 2022: Best Roots Gospel Album – My Savior: won
    - Best Country Duo or Group Performance – "If I Didn't Love You" (with Jason Aldean): nominated
- iHeartRadio Music Awards
  - 2016: Country Artist of the Year: nominated
  - 2017: Country Artist of the Year: nominated
    - Country Song of the Year – "Church Bells": nominated
  - 2019: Country Artist of the Year: nominated
  - 2022: Country Song of the Year – "If I Didn't Love You" (with Jason Aldean): won
    - Best Collaboration – "If I Didn't Love You" (with Jason Aldean): nominated
  - 2023: Country Artist of the Year: pending
    - Best Tour Style: pending
    - Best Residency: Reflection: The Las Vegas Residency: pending
- MTV Movie & TV Awards
  - 2022: Best Musical Moment – "The Moment of Truth" from Cobra Kai: nominated
- MTV Video Music Awards
  - 2007: Best New Artist – "Before He Cheats": nominated
  - 2025: Best Country Video – "I'm Gonna Love You" (with Cody Johnson): pending
- People's Choice Awards
  - 2007: Favorite Female Performer: won
    - Favorite Country Song – "Before He Cheats", won
  - 2009: Favorite Female Artist: nominated
    - Favorite Country Artist: won
    - Favorite Star – 35 Under: won
    - Favorite Female Performer: won
    - Favorite Country Song – "Last Name": won
  - 2010: Favorite Female Artist: nominated
    - Favorite Country Artist: won
  - 2013: Favorite Country Artist: nominated
    - Favorite Album – Blown Away: nominated
    - Favorite Female Artist: nominated
  - 2014: Favorite Female Country Artist: nominated
  - 2015: Favorite Female Country Artist: won
  - 2016: Favorite Female Country Artist: won
  - 2017: Favorite Female Country Artist: won
  - 2018: Female Artist: nominated
  - 2018: Country Artist: nominated
  - 2019: Country Artist: nominated
  - 2021: Country Artist: nominated
  - 2022: Country Artist: won
  - 2024: The Female Country Artist: nominated
- Teen Choice Awards
  - 2005: Choice Summer Song – "Inside Your Heaven": nominated
    - Choice Female Reality/Variety Star for American Idol: won
  - 2006: Choice Female Breakout Artist: nominated
    - Choice Female Artist: nominated
  - 2007: Choice Music Payback – "Before He Cheats": nominated
    - Choice Female Artist: nominated
  - 2008: Choice Red Carpet Female Icon: won
  - 2009: Choice Female Artist Album – Carnival Ride: nominated
  - 2010: Choice American Idol Alum: nominated
    - Choice Music: Country Song – "Undo It": nominated
    - Choice Music: Country Album – Play On: nominated
    - Choice Female Country Artist: nominated
  - 2012: Choice Female Country Artist: nominated
  - 2013: Choice Female Country Artist: nominated
  - 2014: Choice Female Country Artist: nominated
    - Choice Music: Country Song – "Somethin' Bad" (with/Miranda Lambert): nominated
  - 2015: Choice Music: Country Artist: won
    - Choice Music: Country Song – "Little Toy Guns": won'
  - 2016: Choice Music: Country Artist: won
  - 2017: Choice Music: Country Artist: won
  - 2017: Choice Music: Country Song – "The Fighter" (with/Keith Urban): nominated
  - 2018: Choice Music: Country Artist: won
  - 2018: Choice Music: Country Song – "Cry Pretty": nominated
- World Music Awards
  - 2006: World's Best-Selling New Artist: nominated

=== Constantine Maroulis ===
- Tony Awards
  - 2009: Best Performance by a Leading Actor in a Musical: Rock of Ages: nominated

=== David Brown / Lucky Daye ===
- Grammy Awards
  - 2020:
    - Best R&B Song - "Roll Some Mo"; nominated
    - Best R&B Performance - "Roll Some Mo": nominated
    - Best R&B Album - Painted: nominated
    - Best Traditional R&B Performance - "Real Games": nominated
  - 2022:
    - Best Traditional R&B Performance - "How Much Can A Heart Take" (with Yebba): nominated
    - Best Progressive R&B Album - Table for Two: won
  - 2023:
    - Best R&B Album - Candydrip: nominated
    - Best R&B Performance - "Over": nominated
    - Best R&B Song - "Good Morning Gorgeous" (as a songwriter): nominated
    - Album of the Year - Good Morning Gorgeous (as a songwriter): nominated
    - Album of the Year - Renaissance (as a songwriter): nominated
  - 2025:
    - Best R&B Album - "Algorithm": nominated
    - Best Traditional R&B Performance - "That's You": won
- American Music Awards
  - 2022:
    - Best Male R&B Artist: nominated
- BET Awards
  - 2022
    - Best Male R&B/Pop Artist: nominated
- NAACP Image Awards
  - 2020
    - Best New Artist: nominated
- Soul Train Music Awards
  - 2019
    - Best New Artist: nominated
  - 2021
    - Best Male R&B/Soul Artist: nominated
  - 2022
    - Best Male R&B/Soul Artist: nominated
- MTV Video Music Awards
  - 2023
    - Best R&B (with Alicia Keys): nominated

== Season 5 ==
=== Taylor Hicks ===
- Billboard Awards
  - 2006: Top Hot 100 Single Sales ("Do I Make You Proud/Takin It to the Streets")
- Teen Choice Awards
  - 2006: Choice Male Breakout Artist": nominated

=== Katharine McPhee ===
- Teen Choice Awards
  - 2006: Choice Breakout Female Artist: nominated
  - 2007: Choice Breakout Female Artist: nominated
  - 2012: Choice Breakout TV Star – Smash: nominated
- Young Hollywood Awards
  - 2007: Exciting New Vocalist: won

=== Chris Daughtry/Daughtry ===
- American Music Awards
  - 2007: Favorite Adult Contemporary Artist: won
    - Favorite Pop/Rock Album – Daughtry: Won
    - Favorite Breakthrough Artist: won
    - Fan Choice Award: nominated
  - 2008: Favorite Pop/Rock Duo or Group: Winner
    - Favorite Adult Contemporary Artist: nominated
  - 2009: Favorite Adult Contemporary Artist: nominated
- Billboard Awards
  - 2007: Top Pop Duo or Group: won
    - Top Pop New Artist: won
    - Hot 100 Duo or Group: won
    - Top Billboard 200 Album – Daughtry (album): won
    - Top Billboard 200 Artist: won
    - Top Billboard 200 Duo or Group: won
- Kids Choice Awards
  - 2009: Favorite Band: nominated
- Grammy Awards
  - 2008: Best Rock Album – Daughtry: nominated
    - Best Rock Song – "It's Not Over": nominated
    - Best Rock Performance by a Duo or Group – "It's Not Over": nominated
    - Best Pop Performance by a Duo or Group – "Home": nominated
- MTV Video Music Awards
  - 2007: Monster Single of the Year – "Home": nominated
- People's Choice Awards
  - 2007: Best Rock Song – "Home": won
  - 2010: Best Rock Group: nominated
- Teen Choice Awards
  - 2007: Choice Breakout Group: nominated
    - Choice Rock Track – "It's Not Over": nominated
- World Music Awards
  - 2007, Worlds Best Selling Rock Group Of 2007: won
    - Worlds Best Selling New Artist Of 2007: won

=== Kellie Pickler ===
- Academy of Country Music
  - 2007: New Female Vocalist: nominated
  - 2008: New Female Vocalist: nominated
- American Country Awards
  - 2013: Female Video of the Year – "Someone Somewhere Tonight": nominated
- ASCAP Awards
  - 2007: Songwriter Award – "Red High Heels": won
  - 2008: Songwriter Award – "I Wonder": won
- CMT Music Awards
  - 2007: Breakthrough Video of the Year – "Red High Heels": nominated
  - 2008: Best Performance – "I Wonder" CMT Music Awards USA Weekend Breakthrough Video of the Year: won
    - Best Tearjerker Video – "I Wonder": won
    - Best Performance – "I Wonder" @ CMA Awards: won
  - 2009: Female Video of the Year – "Don't You Know You're Beautiful": nominated
- Country Music Association Awards
  - 2007: Horizon Award: nominated
  - 2008: New Artist of the Year: nominated
- ASCAP Awards
  - 2007: Songwriter Award – "Red High Heels": won
  - 2008: Songwriter Award – "I Wonder": won
- Daytime Emmy Award
  - 2018: Outstanding Informative Talk Show Host – Picker & Ben: nominated
- Teen Choice Awards
  - 2011: Choice Female Country Artist: nominated
  - 2012: Choice Female Country Artist: nominated

=== Ace Young ===
- Grammy Awards
  - 2008: Best Rock Song – "It's Not Over" (as a songwriter): nominated

=== Mandisa ===
- Grammy Awards
  - 2008: Best Pop/Contemporary Gospel Album – True Beauty: nominated
  - 2010: Best Pop/Contemporary Gospel Album – Freedom: nominated
  - 2012: Best Contemporary Christian Music Album – What If We Were Real: nominated
  - 2014:
    - Best Gospel/Contemporary Christian Music Performance – Overcomer: nominated
    - Best Contemporary Christian Music Album – Overcomer: won

== Season 6 ==
=== Jordin Sparks ===
- American Music Awards
  - 2008: Favorite Adult Contemporary Artist: won
- BET Awards
  - 2008: Viewer's Choice – "No Air": nominated
    - Best Heartbreak Video – "No Air" (with Chris Brown): Won
- Grammy Awards
  - 2009: Best Pop Collaboration With Vocals – "No Air" (with Chris Brown): nominated
  - 2024: Best Contemporary Christian Music Performance/Song – "Love Me Like I Am" (with for KING & COUNTRY) – nominated
- MTV Video Music Awards
  - 2008: Best Female Video – "No Air": nominated
    - Best New Artist – "No Air": nominated
- MTV Australia Awards
  - 2009: Best Collaboration for "No Air": nominated
- NAACP Image Awards
  - 2008: Outstanding New Artist: won
  - 2009: Outstanding Duo or Group/ Collaboration: nominated
  - 2026: Outstanding Gospel/Christian Song – "Constant (Live)" (with Maverick City Music, Chandler Moore & Anthony Gargiulo) – pending
- People's Choice Awards
  - 2008: Favorite Combined Forces for "No Air" (with Chris Brown): won
    - Favorite Pop Song for "No Air": nominated
- Teen Choice Awards
  - 2007: Choice Female Reality/Variety Star for American Idol: nominated
  - 2008: Choice Hook Up Song – "No Air": won
    - Choice Breakthrough Artist: nominated
    - Choice Love Song – "No Air": nominated

=== Sanjaya Malakar ===
- Teen Choice Awards
  - 2007: Choice Male Reality/Variety Star for American Idol: won

== Season 7 ==
=== David Cook ===
- ASCAP Pop Awards
  - 2010: Most Performed Songs of The Year Award: "Light On": won
- Teen Choice Awards
  - 2008: Choice Male Reality/Variety Star for American Idol: won
  - 2009: Choice Male Artist Album – David Cook: nominated
    - Choice Breakout Artist: nominated
- The New Music Awards
  - 2008: Top 40 Male Artist of the Year: won
- Nashville Music Awards
  - 2009: Song of the Year – "Time of My Life": won

=== David Archuleta ===
- Alma Awards
  - 2009: Music Rising Star: won
- Teen Choice Awards
  - 2008: Choice Summer Most Fanatic Fan: won
    - Choice Best Smile: won
  - 2009: Choice Music Tour: won
    - Choice Breakout Artist: won
    - Choice Love Song – "Crush": won
  - 2010: Choice American Idol Alum: won
    - Choice Most Fanatic Fan: nominated

== Season 8 ==
=== Kris Allen ===
- Teen Choice Awards
  - 2009: Choice Male Reality TV Star: nominated
    - Choice Summer Tour (shared with American Idol Top 10) :nominated
- BMI London Music Awards
  - 2010: Award-Winning Songs – "Live Like We're Dying": won
- Billboard Music Award
  - 2011: Top Christian Song – "Live Like We're Dying": nominated
- BMI Pop Music Award
  - 2011: Award-Winning Songs – "Live Like We're Dying": won
- ASCAP Pop Music Award
  - 2011: Award-Winning Songs – "Live Like We're Dying": won

=== Adam Lambert ===
- All Headline News
  - 2010: Top Live Act of 2010, 7th on list
- Attitude Awards
  - 2015: The Music Award: won
- Barbara Walters' 10 Most Fascinating People
  - 2009: Barbara Walters 10 Most Fascinating People of 2009, 7th on list
- Billboard Year-End Chart Awards
  - 2009: Top Artist: nominated
    - Top 200 Album – For Your Entertainment: nominated
    - Top Hot 100 Song – "Whataya Want From Me": nominated
    - Top Radio Song – "Whataya Want From Me": nominated
    - Top Digital Song – "Whataya Want From Me": nominated
    - Top Adult Contemporary Song – "Whataya Want From Me": nominated
    - Top Canadian Hot 100 Song – "Whataya Want From Me": nominated
- Billboard.com Mid-Year Music Awards
  - 2012: Best Style: nominated
    - Best Music Video — "Never Close Our Eyes": nominated
    - Favorite Billboard 200 No.1 Album – Trespassing: nominated
- Billboard Japan Music Awards
  - 2009: Top Pop Artist: nominated
- British LGBT Awards
  - 2015: Music Icon Award: won
    - Music Artist: nominated
  - 2021: Celebrity: nominated
- BMI Pop Music Award
  - 2011: Award-Winning Songs – "Whataya Want From Me": won
- Bravo Otto Awards Germany
  - 2011: Best International Artist: nominated
- BT Digital Music Awards
  - 2011" People's Choice Award for Best Fan Site for an Artist: nominated
- Chinese Music Awards
  - 2013: Favorite International Artist : won
- Classic Rock Roll of Honour Awards
  - 2014: Band of the Year (with Queen): won
  - 2017: Tour of the Year (with Queen): won
- CMA Wild and Young Awards Germany
  - 2010: Best International Male Singer: won
  - 2010: Best International Single – "Whataya Want From Me": won
- CMT Music Awards
  - 2016: CMT Peforamnce of the Year – "Girl Crush" (with Leona Lewis): nominated
- Do Something Awards
  - 2011: Do Something Music Artist : nominated
  - 2012: Do Something Music Artist: nominated
- Dorian Awards
  - 2010: TV or Musical Comedy Performance of the Year: nominated
  - 2019: TV Musical Performance of the Year: nominated
- EQCA Equality Awards
  - 2011: Equality Idol Award: won
- Flecking Records, UK
  - 2010: Entertainer of the Year: won
    - Sexiest Male Celebrity: won
  - 2011: Male Style Icon Of The Year: won
    - Male Twitterer Of The Year, won
    - Male Musician Of The Year, won
    - Male Star Of The Year, won
    - Good News Of The Year ("Whataya Want from Me" Grammy nomination): won
- Fonogram Hungarian Music Awards
  - 2011: International Modern Pop-Rock Album of the Year – For Your Entertainment: won
- GLAAD Media Awards
  - 2010: Outstanding Music Artist: nominated
- Grammy Awards
  - 2011: Best Male Pop Vocal Performance – "Whataya Want From Me": nominated
- Hungarian Music Awards
  - 2011: International Modern Pop/Rock Album of the Year – For Your Entertainment: won
  - 2013: International Modern Pop/Rock Album of the Year – Trespassing: nominated
  - 2016: International Modern Pop/Rock Album of the Year – The Original High: nominated
- International Dance Music Awards
  - 2010: Best Breakthrough Artist (solo) : nominated
- iHeartRadio Music Awards
  - 2016: Best Fan Army — Glamberts: nominated
- Mashable Awards (Social Media)
  - 2011: Must-Follow Musician on Social Media: nominated
- MTV Video Music Awards Japan
  - 2019: Best Male Video – "Whataya Want From Me": nominated
- MTV O Music Awards
  - 2011: Must Follow Artist on Twitter: won
    - Fan Army FTW: nominated
  - 2012: Must Follow Artist on Twitter: nominated
    - Fan Army FTW: nominated
- MuchMusic Video Awards
  - 2010: UR Fave International Video – "Whataya Want From Me": won
    - International Video Of The Year – Artist: nominated
- NewNowNext Awards
  - 2012: Super Fan Site www.adam-lambert.org: nominated
- NRJ Radio Germany
  - 2010: Best Song of 2010 – "Whataya Want from Me": won
- O Music Awards
  - 2011:Favorite F**k Yeah Tumblr : nominated
    - 2011: Must Follow Artist on Twitter: nominated
    - 2011: Fan Army FTW: nominated
  - 2012: Fan Army FTW: nominated
    - 2012: Must Follow Artist on Twitter: nominated
  - 2013: Fan Army FTW: nominated
- People's Choice Awards
  - 2009: Breakthrough Artist: nominated
- Teen Choice Awards
  - 2009: Choice Reality Male Contestant for American Idol: won
    - Choice Red Carpet Male Icon: nominated
    - Choice Summer Tour (shared with American Idol Top 10): nominated
  - 2010: Choice Music: Male Artist: nominated
- Time Top 100 Poll of Most Influential People in the World
  - 2009: Time Top 100 Poll, 90th on list
- VH1 Do Something Awards
  - 2011: Do Something Music Artist: nominated
- Young Hollywood Awards
  - 2009: Artist of the Year: won

=== Danny Gokey ===
- Teen Choice Awards
  - 2009; Choice Summer Tour (shared with American Idol Top 10): nominated
- American Country Awards
  - 2010: Breakthrough Artist of the Year: nominated
- Grammy Awards
  - 2018: Best Contemporary Christian Album – Rise: nom
  - 2020: Best Contemporary Christian Album – Haven't Seen It Yet: pending

=== Allison Iraheta ===
- Teen Choice Awards
  - 2009: Choice Summer Tour (shared with American Idol Top 10): nominated

=== Matt Giraud ===
- Teen Choice Awards
  - 2009: Choice Summer Tour (shared with American Idol Top 10): nominated

=== Anoop Desai ===
- Teen Choice Awards
  - 2009: Choice Summer Tour (shared with American Idol Top 10): nominated

=== Lil Rounds ===
- Teen Choice Awards
  - 2009: Choice Summer Tour (shared with American Idol Top 10): *Nominated)

=== Scott MacIntyre ===
- Teen Choice Awards
  - 2009: Choice Summer Tour (shared with American Idol Top 10): nominated

=== Megan Joy ===
- Teen Choice Awards
  - 2009: Choice Summer Tour (shared with American Idol Top 10): nominated

=== Michael Sarver ===
- Teen Choice Awards
  - 2009: Choice Summer Tour (shared with American Idol Top 10): nominated

== Season 9 ==
=== Lee DeWyze ===
- Teen Choice Awards
  - 2010: Choice Male Reality TV Star for American Idol: won
- Malibu Music Awards
  - 2012: Best Album Award: won
    - Rock Alternative Award: won

=== Crystal Bowersox ===
- Teen Choice Awards
  - 2010: Choice TV: Female Reality/Variety Star for American Idol: nominated

== Season 10 ==
=== Scotty McCreery ===
- ACM Awards
  - 2012: Top New Solo Artist: won
- American Country Awards
  - 2011: Artist of the Year: New Artist: won
- Billboard Music Awards
  - 2012: Top New Artist: nominated
    - Top Country Album – Clear as Day: nominated
- CMT Music Awards
  - 2012: USA Weekend Breakthrough Video of the Year – "The Trouble With Girls": won
  - 2023: CMT Digital–First Performance of the Year – "Damn Strait": nominated
  - 2024: CMT Digital–First Performance of the Year – "It Matters to Her": won
- Music Row Awards
  - 2012: Breakthrough Artist: nominated
- Teen Choice Awards
  - 2011: Choice Music Breakout Artist: nominated
  - 2012: Choice Male Country Artist: nominated
    - Choice Male Reality TV Star for American Idol: nominated

=== Lauren Alaina ===
- ACM Awards
  - 2018:
    - New Female Vocalist of the Year: won
    - Vocal Event of the Year – "What If’s" (with Kane Brown): nom
- American Country Awards
  - 2012: New Artist of the Year: won
- Billboard Music Award
  - 2018: Top Country Song – "What If’s" (with Kane Brown): nominated
- CMT Music Awards
  - 2012: USA Weekend Breakthrough Video of the Year – "Like My Mother Does": nominated
  - 2017: Breakthrough Video of the Year – "Road Less Traveled": won
  - 2018:
    - Video of the Year – "What If’s" (with Kane Brown): Nominated
    - Female Video of the Year – "Doin’ Fine": nominated
    - Collaborative Video of the Year – "What If’s" (with Kane Brown): won
- Country Music Association Awards
  - 2017: New Artist of the Year: nominated
  - 2018: New Artist of the Year: nominated
- Golden Mic Awards
  - 2018: Best Club Act: nominated
- Music Row Awards
  - 2017: Breakthrough Artist Writ of the Year: won
- Teen Choice Awards
  - 2012:
    - Choice Female Country Artist: nominated
    - Choice Female Reality TV Star: nominated
- Inspirational Country Music Awards
  - 2011: Inspirational Video – "Like My Mother Does": nominated
- Radio Disney Music Awards
  - 2017: Country Best New Artist: nominated

== Season 11 ==
=== Phillip Phillips ===
- American Music Awards
  - 2013: New Artist of the Year: nominated
- Billboard Music Awards
  - 2013: Top Rock Album – "The World From the Side of the Moon": nominated
    - Top Rock Song – "Home": nominated
- World Music Awards
  - 2012: World's Best Song "Home": nominated
  - 2012: World's Best Male Artist: nominated
- Teen Choice Awards
  - 2012: Choice Love Song – "Home": nominated
    - Choice Breakout Artist: nominated
  - 2013: Choice Male Artist: nominated
- BMI Pop Music Award
  - 2014: Award-Winning Songs – "Raging Fire": won

=== Colton Dixon ===
- GMA Dove Awards
  - 2013: New Artist of the Year: nominated
    - Best Rock/Contemporary Album of the Year – "A Messenger" : won
    - Best Rock/Contemporary Song of the Year – "You Are": nominated
  - 2015: Best Rock/Contemporary Album of the Year – "Anchor": nominated

== Season 14 ==
=== Clark Beckham ===
- Teen Choice Awards
  - 2015: Choice Music: Next Big Thing: nominated

== Season 16 ==
=== Maddie Poppe ===
- People's Choice Awards
  - 2018: Competition Contestant of 2018: won

=== Gabby Barrett ===
- Academy of Country Music Awards
  - 2020: New Female Artist of the Year: nominated
  - 2021: New Female Artist of the Year: won
    - Single of the Year – "I Hope": nominated
  - 2022: Female Artist of the Year: pending
- American Music Awards
  - 2021: Favorite Female Artist: nominated
    - Favorite Country Album – Goldmine: won
    - Favorite Country Song – "The Good Ones": won
- Billboard Music Awards
  - 2021: Top New Artist: nominated
    - Top Country Artist: nominated
    - Top Female Country Artist: won
    - Top Hot 100 Song – "I Hope" (w/Charlie Puth): nominated
    - Top Radio Song – "I Hope" (w/Charlie Puth): nominated
    - Top Selling Song – "I Hope" (w/Charlie Puth): nominated
    - Top Collaboration – "I Hope" (w/Charlie Puth): won
    - Top Country Song – "I Hope" (w/Charlie Puth): won
    - Top Country Album – Goldmine: nominated
- CMT Music Awards
  - 2020: Breakthrough Video of the Year – "I Hope": won
  - 2021: Female Video of the Year – "The Good Ones": won
  - 2022: Female Video of the Year – "Footprints on the Moon": nominated
  - 2024: Female Video of the Year – "Glory Days": nominated
- CMA Awards
  - 2020: New Artist of the Year: nominated
    - Single of the Year – "I Hope": nominated
  - 2021: New Artist of the Year: nominated
    - Female Vocalist of the Year: nominated
    - Single of the Year – "The Good Ones": nominated
    - Song of the Year – "The Good Ones": nominated
- iHeartRadio Music Awards
  - 2021: Country Song of the Year – "I Hope": nominated
    - Best New Country Artist – won
    - Best Collaboration – "I Hope" (w/Charlie Puth): nominated
  - 2022: Country Song of the Year – "The Good Ones": nominated
- People's Choice Awards
  - 2024: The Female Country Artist: nominated

== Season 19 ==
=== Chayce Beckham ===
- CMT Music Awards
  - 2024: Male Breakthrough Video of the Year – "23": nominated

=== Benson Boone ===
- American Music Awards
  - 2025: New Artist of the Year: pending
    - Favorite Male Artist: pending
    - Song of the Year - "Beautiful Things": pending
    - Favorite Music Video – "Beautiful Things": pending
    - Favorite Pop Song – "Beautiful Things": pending
- APRA Awards (Australia)
  - 2025: Most Performed International Work - "Beautiful Things": nominated
- Billboard Music Awards
  - 2024: Top New Artist: nominated
    - Top Hot 100 Song – "Beautiful Things": nominated
    - Top Radio Song – "Beautiful Things": nominated
    - Top Selling Song – "Beautiful Things": nominated
    - Top Billboard Global 200 Song – "Beautiful Things": won
    - Top Billboard Global 200 (Excl. U.S. Song) – "Beautiful Things": won
- Brit Awards
  - 2025: International Artist of the Year: nominated
    - Best International Song: "Beautiful Things": nominated
- Grammy Awards
  - 2025: Best New Artist: nominated
- Los 40 Music Awards
  - 2024: Best Artist: nominated
    - Best New Artist: won
    - Best Album – Fireworks & Rollerblades: nominated
    - Best Song – "Beautiful Things": won
    - Best Live: nominated
- Melon Music Awards
  - 2024: Best Pop Artist : won
- MTV Europe Music Awards
  - 2024: Best Song – "Beautiful Things": nominated
    - Best New Act: won
- MTV Video Music Awards
  - 2024: Best New Artist: won
    - Best Alternative – "Beautiful Things": won
    - Song of the Summer - "Beautiful Thing's": nominated
    - PUSH Performance of the Year – "In the Stars": nominated
- MTV Video Music Awards Japan
  - 2025: Best International New Artist Video – "Beautiful Things": won
- Nickelodeon Kids' Choice Awards
  - 2024: Favorite Viral Song – "Beautiful Thing's": nominated
  - 2025: Favorite Male Breakout Artist: pending
- NRJ Music Awards
  - 2024: International Revelation for Beautiful Things: won
  - 2024: International Revelation for Beautiful Things: won
- Premios Odeón
  - 2025: International New Artist: won

== Season 20 ==
=== Noah Thompson ===
- People's Choice Awards
  - 2022: Competition Contestant of 2022: nominated

== Season 23 ==
=== Jamal Roberts ===
- Grammy Awards
  - 2026: Best Gospel Performance/Song – "Still (Live)" (with Jonathan McReynolds): nominated

== By major awards ==
=== Grammy Awards ===
Grammy Award notes:

- Kelly Clarkson became the first Idol winner and alum to win a Grammy.
- Clarkson & Ruben Studdard became the first Idol winners and alums to be nominated for a Grammy.
- Most Grammy nominations: Kelly Clarkson with 17.
- Most Grammy wins: Carrie Underwood with 8.
- Most Grammy-nominated season: season 5 (Chris Daughtry, Mandisa & Ace Young).
- Clarkson, Studdard, Fantasia Barrino, Underwood, Jordin Sparks, and Jamal Roberts are the only winners to be nominated for a Grammy.
- Adam Lambert is the only runner-up to be nominated for a Grammy.
- Clarkson, Hudson, and Mandisa are the only contestants to win a Grammy for an album
- Clarkson was the first to have an album nominated for a Grammy and to win it.
- Clarkson is the first to win a Grammy for an album more than once.
- Clarkson is the first and only to have a song nominated for Record of the Year.
- Underwood, Kelly & Boone are the only contestants to be nominated for Best New Artist.
- Underwood is the only contestant to win Best New Artist.
- Underwood is the first and only alum to win a Big Four Grammy category – Best New Artist in 2007.
- Underwood became the first alum to have a song nominated for Song of the Year.
- Clarkson and Underwood are the only alums to have a song nominated for Song of the Year, though they themselves were not nominated, not being the songwriters.
- Underwood is the fastest alum to win a Grammy, 1 year and 4 months since the release of her debut album, Some Hearts.
- Roberts is the fastest alum to be nominated for a Grammy, six months since winning the show.
- Six of Clarkson's ten albums have been nominated for Best Pop Vocal Album. One of her albums was nominated for Best Traditional Pop Vocal album.
- Clarkson, Hudson, and Underwood are the only Idol contestants to win more than one Grammy.
- Barrino, Hudson, Daughtry, and Mandisa, earned Grammy nominations for their debut albums.
- Studdard, Daughtry, Sparks, Young, Danny Gokey, and Lambert are the only ones who have been nominated and not win.
- 15 Idol alums have been nominated for Grammys.
- Total Grammy nominations earned by Idol contestants: 85 nominations, 15 wins.

Fantasia Barrino (1 win, 12 nominations)
Year	Category	Track / Album	Result
2006	Best Traditional R&B Vocal Performance	"Summertime"	Nominated
2006	Best Female R&B Vocal Performance	"Free Yourself"	Nominated
2006	Best R&B Album	Free Yourself	Nominated
2008	Best Contemporary R&B Album	Fantasia	Nominated
2008	Best Female R&B Vocal Performance	"When I See U"	Nominated
2009	Best R&B Performance By A Duo Or Group With Vocals	"I'm His Only Woman" (with Jennifer Hudson)	Nominated
2011	Best Female R&B Vocal Performance	"Bittersweet"	Won
2011	Best R&B Album	Back to Me	Nominated
2014	Best Traditional R&B Vocal Performance	"Get It Right"	Nominated
2014	Best R&B Song	"Without Me"	Nominated
2014	Best Urban Contemporary Album	Side Effects of You	Nominated
2017	Best Traditional R&B Performance	"Sleeping with the One I Love"	Nominated
Benson Boone (1 nomination)
2025	Best New Artist	Himself	Nominated
Kelly Clarkson (3 wins, 17 nominations)
2004	Best Female Pop Vocal Performance	"Miss Independent"	Nominated
2006	Best Female Pop Vocal Performance	"Since U Been Gone"	Won
2006	Best Pop Vocal Album	Breakaway	Won
2008	Best Country Collaboration	"Because of You" (with Reba McEntire)	Nominated
2010	Best Pop Vocal Album	All I Ever Wanted	Nominated
2012	Best Country Duo or Group Performance	"Don't You Wanna Stay" (with Jason Aldean)	Nominated
2013	Best Pop Solo Performance	"Stronger (What Doesn't Kill You)"	Nominated
2013	Record of the Year	"Stronger (What Doesn't Kill You)"	Nominated
2013	Best Pop Vocal Album	Stronger	Won
2014	Best Country Duo or Group Performance	"Don't Rush" (with Vince Gill)	Nominated
2016	Best Pop Solo Performance	"Heartbeat Song"	Nominated
2016	Best Pop Vocal Album	Piece by Piece	Nominated
2017	Best Pop Solo Performance	"Piece by Piece (Idol Version)"	Nominated
2018	Best Pop Solo Performance	"Love So Soft"	Nominated
2019	Best Pop Vocal Album	Meaning of Life	Nominated
2023	Best Traditional Pop Vocal Album	When Christmas Comes Around...	Nominated
2024	Best Pop Vocal Album	Chemistry	Nominated
Chris Daughtry/Daughtry (4 nominations)
2008	Best Pop Performance by a Duo or Group with Vocals	"Home"	Nominated
2008	Best Rock Album	Daughtry	Nominated
2008	Best Rock Performance by a Duo or Group with Vocals	"It's Not Over"	Nominated
2008	Best Rock Song	"It's Not Over"	Nominated
Lucky Daye (David Brown) (2 wins, 13 nominations)
2020	Best R&B Song	"Roll Some Mo"	Nominated
2020	Best R&B Performance	"Roll Some Mo"	Nominated
2020	Best R&B Album	Painted	Nominated
2020	Best Traditional R&B Performance	"Real Games"	Nominated
2022	Best Traditional R&B Performance	"How Much Can A Heart Take" (with Yebba)	Nominated
2022	Best Progressive R&B Album	Table for Two	Won
2023	Album of the Year	Renaissance (as songwriter)	Nominated
2023	Album of the Year	Good Morning Gorgeous (Deluxe) (as songwriter)	Nominated
2023	Best R&B Album	Candydrip	Nominated
2023	Best R&B Performance	"Over"	Nominated
2023	Best R&B Song	"Good Morning Gorgeous" (as songwriter)	Nominated
2025	Best R&B Album	Algorithm	Nominated
2025	Best Traditional R&B Performance	"That's You"	Won
Danny Gokey (2 nominations)
2018	Best Contemporary Christian Album	Rise	Nominated
2020	Best Contemporary Christian Album	Haven't Seen It Yet	Nominated
Jennifer Hudson (2 wins, 8 nominations)
2008	Best Motion Picture Soundtrack or Compilation	Dreamgirls Soundtrack	Nominated
2009	Best Female R&B Vocal Performance	"Spotlight"	Nominated
2009	Best R&B Album	Jennifer Hudson	Won
2009	Best R&B Performance By A Duo Or Group With Vocals	"I'm His Only Woman" (with Fantasia)	Nominated
2015	Best R&B Performance	"It's Your World" (feat. R. Kelly)	Nominated
2017	Best Music Theater Album	The Color Purple	Won
2022	Best Soundtrack Compilation for Visual Media	Respect	Nominated
2026	Best Traditional Pop album	The Gift of Love	Nominated
Tori Kelly (1 nomination)
2016	Best New Artist	Herself	Nominated
Adam Lambert (1 nomination)
2011	Best Male Pop Vocal Performance	"Whataya Want From Me"	Nominated
Mandisa (1 win, 5 nominations)
2008	Best Contemporary Pop Gospel Album	True Beauty	Nominated
2010	Best Contemporary Pop Gospel Album	Freedom	Nominated
2012	Best Contemporary Christian Music Album	What If We Were Real	Nominated
2014	Best Christian/Gospel Performance	"Overcomer"	Nominated
2014	Best Contemporary Christian Music Album	Overcomer	Won
Jamal Roberts (1 nomination)
2026	Best Gospel Performance/Song	"Still (Live)" with Jonathan McReynolds	Nominated
Jordin Sparks (2 nominations)
2009	Best Pop Collaboration With Vocals	"No Air" (with Chris Brown)	Nominated
2024	Best Contemporary Christian Music Performance/Song	"Love Me Like I Am" by (with for KING & COUNTRY)	Nominated
Ruben Studdard (1 nomination)
2004	Best Male R&B Vocal Performance	"Superstar"	Nominated
Carrie Underwood (8 wins, 16 nominations)
2007	Best New Artist	N/A	Won
2007	Best Female Country Vocal Performance	"Jesus, Take the Wheel"	Won
2008	Best Country Collaboration with Vocals	"Oh Love"	Nominated
2008	Best Female Country Vocal Performance	"Before He Cheats"	Won
2009	Best Female Country Vocal Performance	"Last Name"	Won
2010	Best Female Country Vocal Performance	"Just a Dream"	Nominated
2010	Best Country Collaboration with Vocals	"I Told You So"	Won
2011	Best Female Country Vocal Performance	"Temporary Home"	Nominated
2012	Best Country Solo Performance	"Mama's Song"	Nominated
2013	Best Country Solo Performance	"Blown Away"	Won
2015	Best Country Solo Performance	"Something in the Water"	Won
2015	Best Country Duo or Group Performance	"Somethin' Bad" (with Miranda Lambert)	Nominated
2016	Best Country Solo Performance	"Little Toy Guns"	Nominated
2017	Best Country Solo Performance	"Church Bells"	Nominated
2022	Best Roots Gospel Album	My Savior	Won
2022	Best Country Duo or Group Performance	"If I Didn't Love You" (with Jason Aldean)	Nominated
Ace Young (1 nomination)
2008	Best Rock Song	"It's Not Over" (Daughtry) as songwriter	Nominated

=== American Music Awards ===
Notes:

- Clarkson was the first Idol alumni to be nominated for and win an AMA.
- Carrie Underwood has won the most AMA's with fifteen.
- Underwood has been nominated the most with twenty-five.
- Clarkson and Underwood are the only alums who have been nominated for and win Artist of the Year.
- Clarkson, Underwood, Daughtry, and Barrett are the only ones who have had albums nominated.
- Underwood's first six albums have won Favorite Country Album.

Clay Aiken
Year	Category	Work	Result
2003	Favorite Male Pop/Rock Artist	Himself	Nominated
2003	Fan's Choice Award	Himself	Nominated
Gabby Barrett
2021	Favorite Female Country Artist	Herself	Nominated
2021	Favorite Country Album	Goldmine	Won
2021	Favorite Country Song	"The Good Ones"	Won
Fantasia Barrino
2005	Favorite Female R&B Soul Artist	Herself	Nominated
2007	Favorite Female R&B Soul Artist	Herself	Nominated
Benson Boone
2025	New Artist of the Year	Himself	Pending
2025	Favorite Male Pop Artist	Himself	Pending
2025	Song of the Year	"Beautiful Things"	Pending
2025	Favorite Music Video	"Beautiful Things"	Pending
2025	Favorite Pop Song	"Beautiful Things"	Pending
Kelly Clarkson
2003	Favorite New Pop/Rock Artist	Herself	Nominated
2005	Artist of the Year	Herself	Won
2005	Favorite Female Pop Rock Artist	Herself	Nominated
2005	Favorite Adult Contemporary Artist	Herself	Won
2005	Favorite Pop/Rock Album	Breakaway	Nominated
2006	Favorite Female Pop/Rock Artist	Herself	Won
2006	Favorite Adult Contemporary Artist	Herself	Won
2012	Favorite Female Pop/Rock Artist	Herself	Nominated
2012	Favorite Adult Contemporary Artist	Herself	Nominated
Chris Daughtry / Daughtry
2007	Breakthrough Artist of the Year	Daughtry	Won
2007	Favorite Adult Contemporary Artist	Daughtry	Won
2007	Favorite Pop/Rock Album	Daughtry	Won
2008	Favorite Pop Rock Duo or Group	Daughtry	Won
2008	Favorite Adult Contemporary Artist	Daughtry	Nominated
2009	Favorite Adult Contemporary Artist	Daughtry	Nominated
Phillip Phillips
2013	New Artist of the Year	Himself	Nominated
Jordin Sparks
2008	Favorite Adult Contemporary Artist	Herself	Won
Ruben Studdard
2003	Favorite Male R&B/Soul Artist	Himseflf	Nominated
Carrie Underwood
2006	Breakthrough Artist of the Year	Herself	Won
2006	Favorite Female Country Artist	Herself	Nominated
2007	Artist of the Year	Herself	Won
2007	Favorite Female Country Artist	Herself	Won
2007	Favorite Country Album	Some Hearts	Won
2008	Favorite Female Country Artist	Herself	Nominated
2008	Favorite Country Album	Carnival Ride	Won
2009	Favorite Female Country Artist	Herself	Nominated
2010	Favorite Female Country Artist	Herself	Nominated
2010	Favorite Country Album	Play On	Won
2012	Favorite Female Country Artist	Herself	Nominated
2012	Favorite Country Album	Blown Away	Won
2013	Favorite Female Country Artist	Herself	Nominated
2014	Favorite Female Country Artist	Herself	Won
2015	Favorite Female Country Artist	Herself	Won
2016	Favorite Female Country Artist	Herself	Won
2016	Favorite Country Album	Storyteller	Won
2017	Favorite Female Country Artist	Herself	Won
2018	Favorite Female Country Artist	Herself	Won
2019	Favorite Female Country Artist	Herself	Won
2019	Favorite Country Album	Cry Pretty	Won
2021	Favorite Country Artist	Herself	Won
2021	Favorite Inspirational Artist	Herself	Won
2022	Favorite Country Artist	Herself	Nominated
2022	Favorite Country Album	Denim & Rhinestones	Nominated

=== Academy Awards ===
- Jennifer Hudson is the only alum to be nominated for and win an Oscar.

Jennifer Hudson
Year	Category	Work	Result
2007	Best Supporting Actress	Dreamgirls	Won

=== BAFTA ===
- Fantasia Barrino and Jennifer Hudson are the only alums to be nominated for a BAFTA.
- Hudson was the first alum to be nominated for BAFTA.
- Hudson is the only alum to win a BAFTA.
- Barrino is the only winner to be nominated for a BAFTA.

Fantasia Barrino
Year	Category	Work	Result
2024	Best Actress in a Leading Role	The Color Purple	Nominated
Jennifer Hudson
2007	Best Supporting Actress	Dreamgirls	Won

=== Billboard Music Awards ===
- Ruben Studdard and Clay Aiken were the first Idol alums to be nominated for a Billboard Music Award.
- Studdard is the first winner to be nominated for a BMA.
- Kelly Clarkson, Ruben Studdard, Fantasia Barrino, Carrie Underwood, Taylor Hicks, Kris Allen, Scotty McCreery and Phillip Phillips are the only winners to be nominated for a BMA.
- Most nominations: Carrie Underwood with twenty-four.
- Most wins: Carrie Underwood with eleven.
- McCreery, Barrett and Boone the only alums to be nominated for Top New Artist.
- Barrett and Boone are the only alums from the ABC era to be nominated for a BMA.
- Clarkson is the only alum to be nominated for Artist of the Year.
- Sixteen Idol alums have been nominated for a BMA.

Clay Aiken
Year	Category	Work	Result
2003	Best Selling Single of 2003	"Bridge over Troubled Water/This Is the Night"	Nominated
2004	Best Selling Christmas Album	My Christmas With Love	Nominated
2005	Best Selling Christmas Album	My Christmas With Love	Nominated
Lauren Alaina
2018	Top Country Song	"What If's" (with Kane Brown)	Nominated
Kris Allen
2011	Top Christian Song	"Live Like We're Dying"	Nominated
Gabby Barrett
2021	Top New Artist	Herself	Nominated
2021	Top Country Artist	Herself	Nominated
2021	Top Female Country Artist	Herself	Won
2021	Top Hot 100 Song	"I Hope" (w/Charlie Puth)	Nominated
2021	Top Radio Song	"I Hope" (w/Charlie Puth)	Nominated
2021	Top Selling Song	"I Hope" (w/Charlie Puth)	Nominated
2021	Top Collaboration	"I Hope" (w/Charlie Puth)	Won
2021	Top Country Song	"I Hope" (w/Charlie Puth)	Won
2021	Top Country Album	Goldmine	Nominated
Fantasia Barrino
2004	Top 100 Hot Sales Single	"I Believe"	Nominated
2004	Top R&B/Hip-Hop Single Sales	"I Believe"	Nominated
2005	Top New R&B/Hip-Hop Artist	Herself	Nominated
2005	Top Hot Adult R&B Artist	Herself	Nominated
Benson Boone
2025	Top New Artist	Himself	Nominated
2025	Top Hot 100 Song	"Beautiful Things"	Nominated
2025	Top Radio Song	"Beautiful Things"	Nominated
2025	Top Selling Song	"Beautiful Things"	Nominated
2025	Top Billboard Global 200 Song	"Beautiful Things"	Won
2025	Top Billboard Global 200 (Excl. U.S.) Song	"Beautiful Things"	Won
Kelly Clarkson
2005	Artist of the Year	Herself	Nominated
2005	Female Billboard 200 Album Artist of the Year	Herself	Nominated
2005	Hot 100 Song of the Year	"Since U Been Gone"	Nominated
2005	Hot 100 Airplay of the Year	"Since U Been Gone"	Nominated
2005	Digital Song of the Year	"Since U Been Gone"	Nominated
Chris Daughtry / Daughtry
2007	Top Pop Duo or Group	Daughtry	Won
2007	Top Pop New Artist	Daughtry	Won
2007	Top 100 Duo or Group	Daughtry	Won
2007	Top Billboard 200 Artist	Daughtry	Won
2007	Top Billboard Duo or Group	Daughtry	Won
2007	Top Billboard 200 Album	Daughtry	Won
Taylor Hicks
2006	Top Hot 100 Single Sales	"Do I Make You Proud/Takin It to the Streets"	Nominated
Jennifer Hudson
2012	Top R&B Album	I Remember Me	Nominated
Scotty McCreery
2012	Top New Artist	Himself	Nominated
2012	Top Country Album	Clear as Day	Nominated
Phillip Phillips
2013	Top Rock Album	The World From the Side of the Moon	Nominated
2013	Top Rock Song	"Home"	Nominated
Ruben Studdard
2003	Top R&B/Hip-Hop Singles Sales	"Superstar/Flying Without Wings"	Nominated
2005	Top Gospel Artist	Himself	Nominated
2005	Top Gospel Album	I Need An Angel	Nominated
Carrie Underwood
2005	Top Hot 100 Single Sales	"Independence Day/Inside Your Heaven"	Won
2006	Top Billboard 200 Album	Inside Hearts	Won
2006	Top Country Album	Inside Hearts	Won
2006	Top Country Album Artist (Female)	Herself	Won
2006	Top New Country Artist	Herself	Won
2006	Top Country Sales Artist	Herself	Won
2006	Top Country Artist	Herself	Won
2006	Top Billboard 200 Album Artist	Herself	Won
2013	Top Country Artist	Herself	Nominated
2013	Top Country Album	Blown Away	Nominated
2014	Milestone Award	Herself	Won
2015	Top Christian Song	"Something in the Water"	Won
2016	Top Country Album	"Storyteller"	Nominated
2016	Top Country Artist	Herself	Nominated
2019	Top Female Country Artist	Herself	Nominated
2019	Top Country Album	Cry Pretty	Nominated
2021	Top Christian Artist	Herself	Nominated
2021	Top Female Country Artist	Herself	Nominated
2021	Top Country Album	My Gift	Nominated
2021	Top Christian Album	My Gift	Won
2022	Top Female Country Artist	Herself	Pending
2022	Top Country Song	"If I Didn't Love You" (with Jason Aldean)	Pending
2022	Top Christian Artist	Herself	Pending
2022	Top Christian Album	My Gift	Pending

=== Brit Awards ===
- Kelly Clarkson is the only alum to be nominated for a Brit Award.

Kelly Clarkson
Year	Category	Work	Result
2006	Best Pop Act	Herself	Nominated
2006	Best International Female Artist	Herself	Nominated

=== Emmy Awards ===
Emmy Awards notes:

- Kelly Clarkson, Jennifer Hudson, Kellie Pickler are the only alums to be nominated for an Emmy.
- Kellie Pickler was the first to be nominated for an Emmy.
- Kelly Clarkson is the first and only winner to be nominated for an Emmy.
- Clarkson is the first winner and alum to win an Emmy.
- Clarkson and Hudson are the only alums to win an Emmy.
- Clarkson has the most nominations with fifteen, and wins with nine.

==== Daytime Emmy Award ====
Kelly Clarkson
Year	Category	Work	Result
2020	Outstanding Talk Show Entertainment	The Kelly Clarkson Show	Nominated
2020	Outstanding Entertainment Talk Show Host	Herself	Won
2021	Outstanding Talk Show Entertainment	The Kelly Clarkson Show	Won
2021	Outstanding Entertainment Talk Show Host	Herself	Won
2021	Outstanding Original Song	"Cabana Boy Troy"	Nominated
2022	Outstanding Talk Show Entertainment	The Kelly Clarkson Show	Won
2022	Outstanding Entertainment Talk Show Host	Herself	Won
2023	Outstanding Daytime Talk Series	The Kelly Clarkson Show	Won
2023	Outstanding Daytime Talk Series Host	Herself	Won
2024	Outstanding Daytime Talk Series	The Kelly Clarkson Show	Won
2024	Outstanding Daytime Talk Series Host	Herself	Nominated
2025	Outstanding Daytime Talk Series	The Kelly Clarkson Show	Nominated
2025	Outstanding Daytime Talk Series Host	Herself	Nominated
2026	Outstanding Daytime Talk Series	The Kelly Clarkson Show	Won
2026	Outstanding Daytime Talk Series Host	Herself	Nominated
Jennifer Hudson
2021	Outstanding Interactive Media for a Daytime Program	"Baby Yoga"	Won
2023	Outstanding Daytime Talk Series	The Jennifer Hudson Show	Nominated
2024	Outstanding Daytime Talk Series	The Jennifer Hudson Show	Nominated
2025	Outstanding Daytime Talk Series	The Jennifer Hudson Show	Nominated
2025	Outstanding Daytime Talk Series Host	Herself	Nominated
2026	Outstanding Daytime Talk Series Host	Herself	Nominated
2026	Kellie Pickler		
2018	Outstanding Informative Talk Show Host	Pickler & Ben	Nominated

=== Golden Globe Awards ===
- Jennifer Hudson is the first alum to be nominated for a Golden Globe
- Hudson, Fantasia Barrino, and Carrie Underwood are the only alums to be nominated for a Golden Globe.
- Barrino and Underwood are the only winners to be nominated for a Golden Globe.
- Hudson is the only alum to win a Golden Globe.

Year	Category	Work	Result
Fantasia Barrino
2024	Best Actress in a Motion Picture – Comedy or Musical	The Color Purple	Nominated
Jennifer Hudson
2007	Best Supporting Actress – Motion Picture	Dreamgirls	Won
2022	Best Original Song	"Here I Am (Singing My Way Home)"	Nominated
Carrie Underwood
2011	Best Original Song	"There's a Place for Us"	Nominated

=== NAACP Image Awards ===
- Ruben Studdard is the first winner and alum to be nominated for and win an Image Award.
- Studdard, Barrino and Sparks are the only winners to win an Image Award.
- Jennifer Hudson has won the most Image Awards with twelve.
- Hudson has the most nominations with twenty-two.

Fantasia Barrino
Year	Category	Work	Result
2005	Outstanding Female Artist	Herself	Won
2007	Outstanding Female Artist	Herself	Nominated
2007	Outstanding Actress in a Mini-Series/TV Movie	Life Is Not a Fairy Tale: The Fantasia Barrino Story	Nominated
2007	Outstanding Duo, Group or Collaboration	"Put You Up on Game"	Won
2009	Outstanding Duo, Group or Collaboration	"I'm His Only Woman" (w/Jennifer Hudson)	Nominated
2011	Best R&B Song	"Bittersweet"	Won
2024	Outstanding Ensemble in a Motion Picture	The Color Purple	Won
2024	Outstanding Actress in a Motion Picture	The Color Purple	Won
2024	Entertainer of the Year	The Color Purple	Nominated
Jennifer Hudson
Year	Category	Work	Result
2007	Outstanding Supporting Actress in a Movie	Dreamgirls	Won
2009	Outstanding New Artist	Herself	Won
2009	Outstanding Supporting Actress in a Movie	The Secret Life of Bees	Nominated
2009	Outstanding Female Artist	Herself	Nominated
2009	Outstanding Duo or Group Collaboration	"I'm His Only Woman" (with Fantasia Barrino)	Won
2009	Outstanding Music Video	"Spotlight"	Nominated
2009	Outstanding Song	"Spotlight"	Nominated
2009	Outstanding Album	Jennifer Hudson	Won
2012	Outstanding Female Artist	Herself	Nominated
2012	Outstanding Album	I Remember Me	Won
2012	Outstanding Music Video	"Where You At"	Won
2014	Outstanding Actress in a Motion Picture	Winnie Mandela	Nominated
2015	Outstanding Female Artist	Herself	Nominated
2015	Outstanding Album	J-Hud	Nominated
2016	Outstanding Supporting Actress in a Motion Picture	Chi-Raq	Nominated
2022	Entertainer of the Year	Herself	Won
2022	Outstanding Actress in a Motion Picture	Respect	Won
2022	Outstanding Motion Picture (Note: As the executive producer of the film)	Respect	Nominated
2022	Outstanding Ensemble Cast in a Motion Picture	Respect	Nominated
2022	Outstanding Duo, Group or Collaboration	"Superstar"	Nominated
2023	Outstanding Host in a Talk or News / Information (Series or Special)	The Jennifer Hudson Show	Won
2024	Outstanding Talk Series	The Jennifer Hudson Show	Won
2025	Outstanding Talk Series	The Jennifer Hudson Show	Won
2025	Outstanding Host in a Talk or News / Information (Series or Special)	Herself	Won
Jordan Sparks
Year	Category	Work	Result
2008	Outstanding New Artist	Herself	Won
2009	Outstanding Duo, Group or Collaboration	Herself, Chris Brown	Nominated
2026	Outstanding Gospel/Christian Song –	"Constant (Live)" (with Maverick City Music, Chandler Moore & Anthony Gargiulo)	Pending
Ruben Studdard
Year	Category	Work	Result
2004	Outstanding Male Artist	Himself	Nominated
2004	Outstanding New Artist	Himself	Won

=== Screen Actors Guild Award ===
- Fantasia Barrino and Jennifer Hudson are the only alums to be nominated for a SAG Award.
- Hudson was the first alum to be nominated for and win a SAG Award.
- Barrino is the only winner to be nominated for a SAG Award.
- Hudson has the most nominations and wins with two and one.

Fantasia Barrino
Year	Category	Work	Result
2024	Outstanding Performance by a Cast in a Motion Picture	The Color Purple	Nominated
Jennifer Hudson
2007	Outstanding Performance by a Cast in a Motion Picture	Dream Girls	Nominated
2007	Outstanding Supporting Actress in a Motion Picture	Dream Girls	Won

=== Tony Awards ===
- Jennifer Hudson is the first and only Idol alum to be nominated for and win a Tony Award.

Jennifer Hudson
Year	Category	Work	Result
2022	A Strange Loop	Best Musical	Won
