= Over (Lucky Daye song) =

Single by Lucky Daye

from the album Candydrip
- Released: September 22, 2021
- Genre: R&B; trap-soul
- Length: 3:25
- Label: Keep Cool; RCA
- Songwriters: Ivan Barias; David Brown; Carl Devonish Jr.; Dernst Emile II; Carvin Haggins; Taalib Johnson; Francis Lai; Mike "Hunnid" McGregor
- Producer: D'Mile

Lucky Daye singles chronology
"Running Blind" (2021)	"Over" (2021)	"Candy Drip" (2022)

Music video
- "Over" on YouTube

"Over" is a song by American singer Lucky Daye. It was released as the lead single from his second studio album Candydrip (2022) on September 22, 2021 via Keep Cool Records and RCA Records. Utilizing a sample of "Halfcrazy", a 2002 song by Musiq Soulchild, the R&B and trap-soul song's lyrics chronicle Daye's anxieties over a toxic and on-again, off-again relationship. Its music video, released concurrently with the single, stars Jordyn Woods.

"Over" received praise from critics and a nomination for the Grammy Award for Best R&B Performance in 2023. It became Daye's biggest commercial hit, peaking at number 77 on the Billboard Hot 100—his first entry on the chart—and earning him his first platinum certification from the Recording Industry of America (RIAA). He later performed the song live as the closing song on his Candydrip Tour in 2022, as well as at the 2021 Soul Train Music Awards, on an episode of the webcast series Verzuz, and on The Tonight Show Starring Jimmy Fallon.

== Release, recording, and composition ==
"Over" was the last song Daye recorded for Candydrip. After a friend suggested that Daye record a "fastball" radio hit for Candydrip, Daye deliberately wrote the melody of "Over" to be "simple". It was produced by D'Mile, who also executive produced Candydrip. Daye was inspired to write the song by a relationship he had during the COVID-19 pandemic which he said taught him "not [to] think everybody can love [him] as much as [he] can love". He has stated that the song was not written from a personal perspective, and instead based on his experiences people-watching, writing the song for "other people [who] don't ... know better than to go back to a relationship".

"Over" was released via Keep Cool Records and RCA Records on September 22, 2021 as the lead single on Lucky Daye's second studio album, Candydrip, which was released in March following year as the follow-up to his debut studio album, Painted (2019). It was released to urban radio on April 11, 2022. It became popular on TikTok and other social media platforms following its initial release.

"Over" heavily samples the acoustic guitar-based instrumental of the 2002 Musiq Soulchild song "Halfcrazy" from his album Juslisen; it also has "moody" bass and a trap drum beat. In the chorus, Daye sings, "'Cause I thought it was over/Got me thinking my feelings over/You keep doing it over and over/You keep calling me back". For Clash, Hollie Geraghty described "Over" as a "slow-burning heartbreaker" and wrote that Daye "sounds like [he] might actually burst into tears" when singing the line "Just want it when it's convenient". Cydney Lee and Neena Rouhani of Billboard wrote that the song has "a bossa nova undertone".

== Commercial performance and critical reception ==
"Over" was Daye's commercial breakthrough and his first song to chart on the Billboard Hot 100, where it debuted at number 92 in March 2022 and peaked at number 77 the following month. It also peaked at number 11 on Billboard's Hot R&B Songs chart. It also became his first and, as of 2024, only entry on the UK Singles Chart, where it peaked at number 80. The song was also certified platinum by the Recording Industry Association of America (RIAA) in March 2023, making it his first song to receive that certification and his second RIAA-certified song after his debut single, "Roll Some Mo", was certified gold in May 2021. By 2023, it was his most-streamed song on Spotify at over 124 million streams. Bobby Carter, for NPR, called "Over" Daye's "biggest song yet" in 2022. Mic's Shanté Cosme also called "Over" Daye's "biggest hit to date" in 2022. In June of 2025, the song was certified Silver by the British Phonographic Industry.

Ana Lamond of Clash called "Over" a "stand-out single" from Candydrip and wrote that it was "where Daye's song-writing and vocal abilities are most striking". Alexis Reese of BET praised the "charisma and charm" that Daye, who she wrote "glided on his track 'Over' with ease", showcased. Andy Kellman, for AllMusic, identified "Over" as an early sign "that the LP would be special", with Kellman likening it to "Babyface gone convincingly trap-soul" and writing that it showed Daye at his "most impassioned", while praising his wordplay for lyrics such as "Know you're a ten, but that attitude ain't fine". Billboard's Neena Rouhani praised "Over" as a "standout track" from Candydrip, which the magazine listed as one of the best R&B albums of 2022, while Pitchfork's Tarisai Ngangura called the song "unforgettable". "Over" was nominated for the Grammy Award for Best R&B Performance at the 65th Annual Grammy Awards, but lost to "Hrs and Hrs" by Muni Long.

== Music video and live performances ==
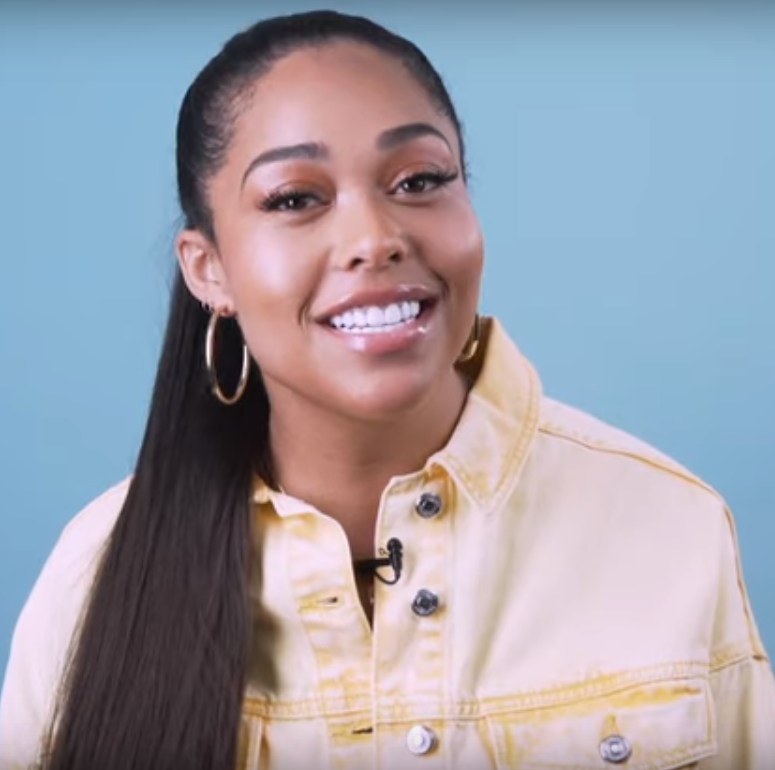
The music video for "Over" stars influencer Jordyn Woods (pictured) as Daye's lover.

The music video for "Over" was filmed in Mexico and released on the same day as the single. It stars influencer Jordyn Woods, whom he met during a dinner hosted by Spotify, where she told him he was a fan of his music and agreed to be in the video at his request. In the video, Woods, wearing a white dress, walks into Daye's dressing room as he walks through a concert hall, overwhelmed by paparazzi and fans grabbing at him before getting ready to appear on stage. As the curtain opens, he is back in his dressing room and caught in a loop of a recurring nightmare of the moment before the curtain opens until he brings Woods with him to the stage. Before he gets on, she leaves him in the wings while holding a watch as he stands in front of a cheering crowd in only a pair of silk boxers. An a cappella performance of the song by Daye was also uploaded to his YouTube channel in November 2021.

Before releasing "Over", Daye premiered it at the Bay Area's Lights On Festival in September 2021. Daye performed it at the Soul Train Music Awards in November 2021, where he opened with a brief cover of "Halfcrazy" and later performed shirtless with two background dancers while flexing his pecs. During a Verzuz battle at the Avalon Hollywood in February 2022, held between Musiq Soulchild and singer Anthony Hamilton, Musiq Soulchild performed "Halfcrazy" before bringing out Daye to perform "Over". Vibe's Mya Abraham complimented the transition between songs as "flawless", calling it a "standout moment" from the battle that caused "grown women" in the audience to "[turn] into screaming teens". Daye also performed it as the closing song of his Candydrip Tour from March to April 2022, on The Tonight Show Starring Jimmy Fallon in April 2022, and at Mary J. Blige's Strength of a Woman Festival at State Farm Arena in May 2023.

== Charts ==
=== Weekly charts ===
Weekly chart performance for "Over"
Chart (2022)	Peak position
Canada (Canadian Hot 100)	80
Global 200 (Billboard)	109
New Zealand Hot Singles (RMNZ)	17
South Africa Streaming (TOSAC)	58
UK Singles (Official Charts)	80
US Billboard Hot 100	77
US Hot R&B/Hip-Hop Songs (Billboard)	22

=== Year-end charts ===
2022 year-end chart performance for "Over"
Chart (2022)	Position
US Hot R&B/Hip-Hop Songs (Billboard)	99

== Certifications ==
Region	Certification	Certified units/sales
United States (RIAA)	Platinum	1,000,000^{‡}
United Kingdom (BPI)	Silver	200,000^{‡}
^{‡} Sales+streaming figures based on certification alone.

== Release history ==
Release dates and formats for "Over"
Region	Date	Format(s)	Label	Ref.
Various	September 22, 2021	Digital download; streaming	Keep Cool; RCA	
United States	April 11, 2022	Urban contemporary radio	Keep Cool; RCA	
