= Tunji Balogun =

American record label executive

- Education: Pomona College
- Occupations: CEO, Def Jam Recordings
- Website: defjam.com

Tunji Balogun is a Nigerian American record label executive. He is the CEO of Def Jam Recordings.

== Education ==
Balogun attended Deerfield Academy in Massachusetts and graduated from Pomona College in 2004.

== Career ==
Balogun began his career as a marketing intern at Warner Bros. Records and was later hired as an assistant at the label after graduating from college. He was also active as a rapper during his college years and into the late 2000s. Most notably, he frequently collaborated with the American hip-hop group CunninLynguists and was part of a duo called Inverse with Toby Ganger.

He later held a position in A&R at Interscope, where he worked with artists signed through Bad Boy Entertainment and Shady Records, in addition to Kendrick Lamar, ScHoolboy Q, Keyshia Cole, OneRepublic, and others. He joined RCA in 2015 as senior vice president of A&R, and was promoted to executive vice president in 2018. At the time of his promotion, RCA announced that it had entered into a joint venture with Balogun, Courtney Stewart, Jon Tanners, and Jared Sherman to establish Keep Cool. The first artist signed to Keep Cool was Normani.

A co-founder of Keep Cool, he was the executive vice president of A&R for RCA Records. Balogun signed or participated in the signing of artists including Brockhampton, Childish Gambino, Goldlink, H.E.R., Khalid, SZA, Bryson Tiller, and Cozz.

He was named CEO of Def Jam in August 2021, and assumed the position in January 2022.
