= Umi (singer) =

American singer (born 1999)

UMI
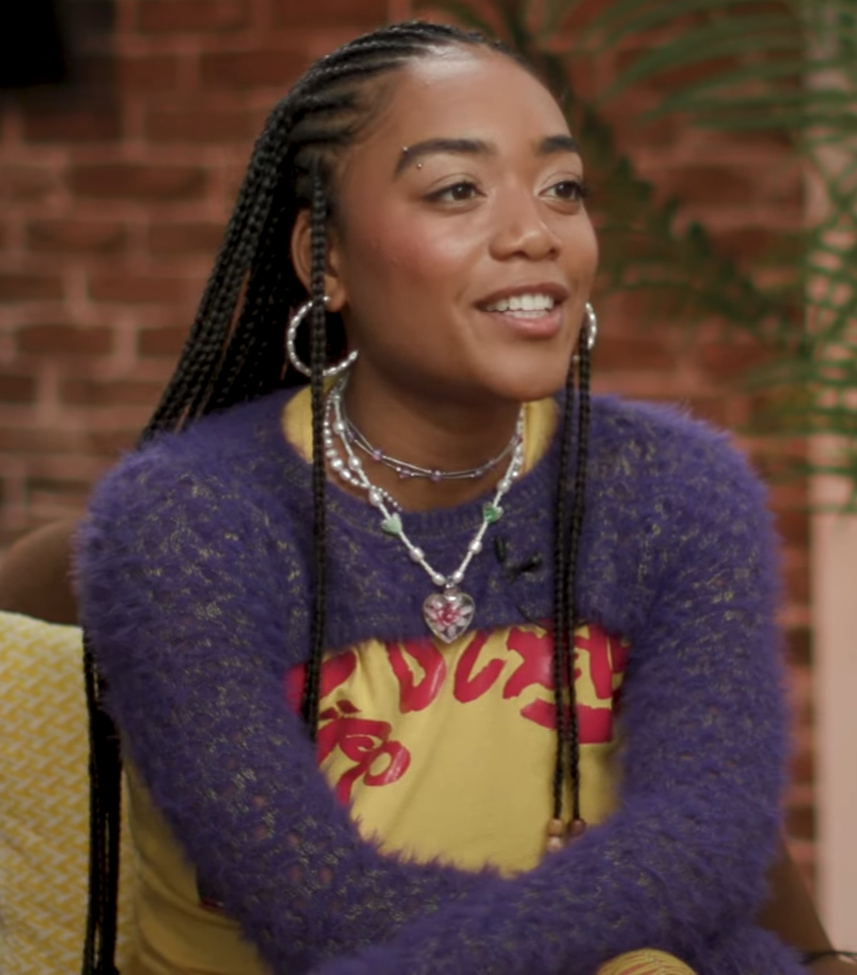
- Wilson in 2024

Background information
- Born: Tierra Umi Wilson; February 9, 1999 (age 27); Seattle, Washington, U.S.
- Genres: Neo soul; R&B
- Years active: 2017–present
- Labels: Keep Cool; RCA
- Website: whoisumi.com

Tierra Umi Wilson (born February 9, 1999), known professionally as UMI, is an American singer and songwriter blending elements of R&B, neo-soul, and alternative pop. Originally from Seattle, Washington, she (Note: Wilson uses both she/her and they/them pronouns. This article uses she/her pronouns for consistency.) attended the University of Southern California, but dropped out in 2019 to pursue music. UMI began gaining attention with her single "Remember Me" in 2018. Since then, UMI has released a string of projects, including the Love Language and Introspection EPs, her debut studio album Forest in the City (2022), and her 2024 EP Talking to the Wind. She has toured with artists like Conan Gray and Jhené Aiko, and collaborated with global figures such as BTS’s V.

== Early life ==
Wilson was born in Seattle in 1999 to an African-American father and a Japanese mother. Her mother taught her how to read, write, and speak Japanese. Wilson's mother plays piano and her father plays the drums. UMI started writing music when she was 4 or 5, with a songwriting journal. Throughout high school, she was involved in DECA (Distributive Education Clubs of America) and her track team at Tahoma High School in Maple Valley. In high school, she discovered YouTube beats and started writing to tracks. She would record the songs with a USB mic and upload them to SoundCloud and YouTube. Her cover versions of songs were determined by SoundCloud to be copyright infringement. This made her start writing and posting her own originals.

== Career ==
=== 2017–2018: Happy Again and debut EP ===
In 2017, UMI released five singles before her four-track debut EP, Interlude. This led to making it onto Spotify's Fresh Finds Best of 2017 playlist. She opened for rapper ODIE in Los Angeles.

UMI's most popular release to date is "Remember Me". UMI debuted "Remember Me" through a music video with focus on universalism by portraying couples of different race, class, and sexual orientation. She said, "the message in the video, for me, is that no matter who you love or how you love, we all hurt the same in the end."

=== 2019–2021: Balance, Love Language, Introspection EP, and Introspection Reimagined ===
UMI released the Balance EP on May 17, 2019, which included the songs "Ordinary" and "Down To Earth." On October 30, 2019, she released their EP, Love Language On June 21, 2020, she released her EP, Introspection. Following the release of her EP, Introspection, UMI released a follow-up EP entitled Introspection Reimagined on March 26, 2021, featuring new versions of the songs on the Introspection EP as well as two new interludes.

=== 2022–2024: Forest in the City debut album, Leaving RCA, Talking to the Wind ===
On May 26, 2022, UMI released her debut album, Forest in the City, which featured the singles "moonlit room", "whatever u like", and "sorry", and was the focus of her first headlining tour.

In January 2023, UMI left RCA to go independent. Two singles that were part of her 2024 EP Talking to the Wind, "happy im" and "why dont we go", were released in mid-2023 before the EP was published in January 2024. In December 2023, she collaborated with V from BTS on "wherever u r", a non-album single that topped multiple charts and spawned two remixes.

=== 2025-present: Signing with Epic, People Stories ===
In 2024, UMI signed with Epic Records. Her first project with Epic and her second album, People Stories, was released on August 22, 2025.

== Artistry ==
UMI has cited her biggest musical influences as Frank Ocean, D'Angelo, Jhené Aiko, Erykah Badu, Sade Adu and SZA. She grew up listening to R&B, soul, gospel and Japanese pop/rock. UMI has been described by Vogue as having a "lo-fi, alternative, laid back, R&B style."

== Discography ==
=== Studio albums ===
| Title | Details |
|---|---|
| Forest in the City | Released: May 26, 2022; Label: RCA, Keep Cool; Formats: Streaming, digital download |
| People Stories | Released: August 22, 2025; Label: Epic; Formats: Streaming, digital download |

=== Extended plays ===
List of extended plays
| Title | Details |
|---|---|
| Interlude | Released: January 25, 2018; Label: 408; Format: Streaming, digital download |
| Balance | Released: May 17, 2019; Label: UMI; Format: Streaming, digital download |
| Love Language | Released: October 30, 2019; Label: UMI; Format: Streaming, digital download |
| Introspection | Released: June 21, 2020; Label: RCA, Keep Cool; Format: Streaming, digital download |
| Introspection Reimagined | Released: March 26, 2021; Label: RCA, Keep Cool; Format: Streaming, digital download |
| Talking to the Wind | Released: January 19, 2024; Label: UMI; Format: Streaming, digital download |

=== Singles ===
==== As a lead artist ====
| Title | Year | Peak chart positions | | | | | | Album |
| Title | Year | US Dig. | US R&B | CAN Dig. | NZ Hot | UK Dig. | WW | Album |
|---|---|---|---|---|---|---|---|---|
| "Friendzone" | 2017 | – | – | – | – | – | — | Non-album single |
| "Midnight Blues" | 2018 | – | – | – | – | – | — | Interlude |
| "River" | 2018 | – | – | – | – | – | — | Non-album singles |
| "Remember Me" | 2018 | – | – | – | – | – | — | Non-album singles |
| "Lullaby" (featuring Yeek) | 2018 | – | – | – | – | – | — | Non-album singles |
| "High School" | 2019 | – | – | – | – | – | — | Non-album singles |
| "Down to Earth" | 2019 | – | – | – | – | – | — | Balance |
| "Sonshine" (with Deaton Chris Anthony) | 2019 | – | – | – | – | – | — | BO Y |
| "Love Affair" | 2019 | – | – | – | – | – | — | Love Language |
| "Mother" | 2020 | – | – | – | – | – | — | Non-album single |
| "Introspection" | 2020 | – | – | – | – | – | — | Introspection |
| "Open Up" | 2020 | – | – | – | – | – | — | Introspection |
| "sorry" | 2022 | – | – | – | – | – | — | Forest in the City |
| "whatever u like" | 2022 | – | – | – | – | – | — | Forest in the City |
| "say im ur luv" | 2022 | – | – | – | – | – | — | Forest in the City |
| "wish that i could" | 2022 | – | – | – | – | – | — | Forest in the City |
| "happy im" | 2023 | – | – | – | – | – | — | Talking to the Wind |
| "why dont we go" | 2023 | – | – | – | – | – | — | Talking to the Wind |
| "wherever u r" (featuring V) | 2023 | 5 | 20 | 10 | 3 | 6 | 99 | Non-album single |
| "Hard Truths" (with 6lack) | 2025 | – | – | – | – | – | — | People Stories |
| "10AM" | 2025 | – | – | – | – | – | — | People Stories |
| "Somewhere New" / "What Now" | 2025 | – | – | – | – | – | — | People Stories |
"—" denotes a recording that did not chart or was not released in that territory.

==== As a featured artist ====
| Title | Year | Album |
|---|---|---|
| "Play Too Much" (Kyle Dion featuring UMI & Duckwrth) | 2020 | Suga |
| "That's On You (Japanese Remix)" (Joyce Wrice featuring UMI) | 2020 | |
| "JULIETTE!" (pH-1 featuring UMI) | 2022 | But For Now Leave Me Alone |
| "Lose My Focus" (Raveena featuring UMI) | 2025 | Where the Butterflies Go in the Rain (Deluxe) |
| "Do What You Want" (BAEKHYUN featuring UMI & Jang-Yi-jeong) | 2025 | Non-album single |

=== Promotional singles ===
| Title | Year | Album |
|---|---|---|
| "Happy Again" | 2017 | Non-album single |
| "Butterfly" | 2018 | Non-album single |
| "Sukidakara" | 2019 | Love Language |
| "Runnin'" (featuring Yeek) | 2019 | Love Language |
| "Picture Perfect" | 2020 | Non-album single |
| "Pretty Girl hi!" | 2020 | Introspection |
| "Moonlit Room" | 2022 | Forest in the City |
| "Butterfly II" | 2024 | Non-album single |
