= Algorithm (Lucky Daye album) =

2024 album by Lucky Daye

Studio album by Lucky Daye
- Released: June 28, 2024
- Recorded: 2023–2024
- Genres: R&B; soul; funk; rock
- Length: 61:16
- Labels: Keep Cool; RCA
- Producers: D'Mile; Michael B. Hunter; Livvy Bennett; Jeff Gitelman; Jamil Pierre; Bruno Mars; The Monsters & Strangerz

Lucky Daye chronology
| Candydrip (2022) | Algorithm (2024) | Aloud! (2026) |

Singles from Algorithm
- 1. "That's You" Released: November 1, 2023; 2. "Hericane" Released: April 19, 2024; 3. "Soft" Released: May 31, 2024

Professional ratings
Review scores
| Source | Rating |
|---|---|
| Clash | 8/10 |
| Pitchfork | 7.3/10 |

Algorithm is the third studio album by American singer-songwriter Lucky Daye, released by Keep Cool Records and RCA Records on June 28, 2024. It was produced by D'Mile and features collaborations with singer-songwriters Teddy Swims and Raye. The album was nominated for Best R&B Album and Best Engineered Album, Non-Classical at the 67th Annual Grammy Awards. The lead single, "That's You", won the Grammy Award for Best Traditional R&B Performance.

== Track listing ==
Algorithm track listing
| No. | Title | Writer(s) | Producer(s) | Length |
|---|---|---|---|---|
| 1. | "Never Leavin' U Lonely" | David Brown; Austin Brown; Dernst Emile II; Michael B. Hunter; Mike McGregor | D'Mile | 4:40 |
| 2. | "Hericane" | D. Brown; Emile II; McGregor; Frank Brim; Dustin Bowie | D'Mile | 3:47 |
| 3. | "Soft" | D. Brown; A. Brown; Emile II; Hunter; McGregor; Bowie; Livvy Bennett | D'Mile; Hunter; Bennett | 5:18 |
| 4. | "Pin" | D. Brown; Emile II; McGregor; Bowie | D'Mile | 4:24 |
| 5. | "Top" | D. Brown; Emile II; McGregor; David Wade | D'Mile | 2:57 |
| 6. | "Algorithm" | D. Brown; McGregor; Carolyn Dodd | D'Mile | 3:20 |
| 7. | "Blame" (featuring Teddy Swims) | D. Brown; Jaten Dimsdale; Jeff Gitelman; Mikky Ekko; Jamil Pierre; Kevin Theodore | Gitelman; Pierre | 3:44 |
| 8. | "Think Different" | D. Brown; Hunter; Bowie | Hunter | 4:07 |
| 9. | "Breakin' the Bank" | D. Brown; Emile II; McGregor; Bowie | D'Mile | 4:58 |
| 10. | "That's You" | D. Brown; Emile II; A. Brown; McGregor; Bruno Mars | D'Mile; Mars | 5:19 |
| 11. | "Mary" | D. Brown; Emile II; A. Brown; McGregor | D'Mile | 4:42 |
| 12. | "Paralyzed" (featuring Raye) | D. Brown; Emile II; A. Brown; McGregor; Rachel Keen | D'Mile | 4:38 |
| 13. | "Lemonade" | D. Brown; Emile II; A. Brown; McGregor | D'Mile; The Monsters & Strangerz | 3:26 |
| 14. | "Diamonds in Teal" | D. Brown; Emile II; McGregor; Brim; Bowie | D'mile | 5:56 |
| Total length: | | | | 61:16 |
