= Lucky Daye =

American singer-songwriter (born 1985)

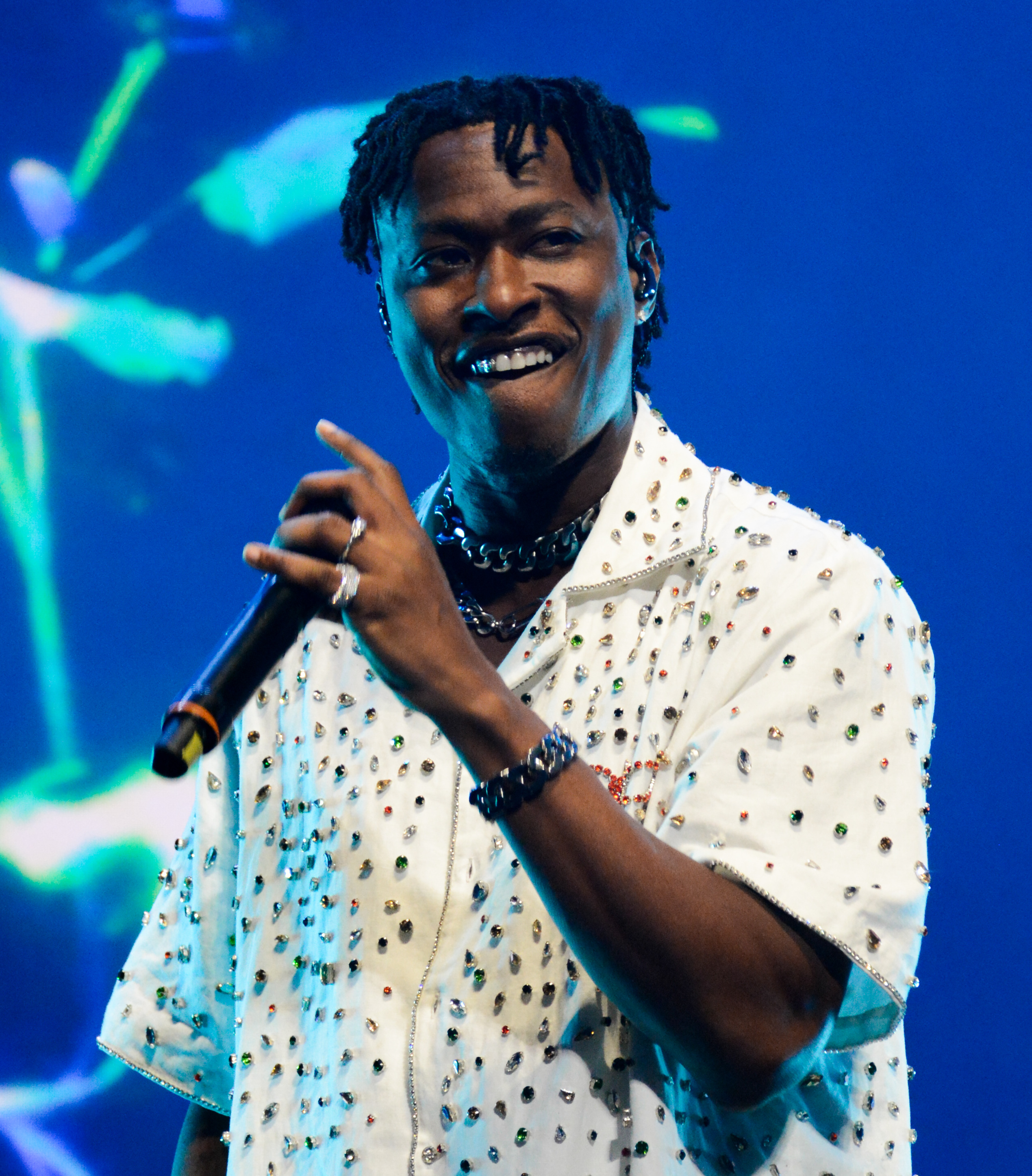

Background information
- Born: David Debrandon Brown; September 25, 1985 (age 41); New Orleans, Louisiana, U.S.
- Genres: R&B; neo soul
- Occupations: Singer; songwriter
- Years active: 2005–present
- Labels: Keep Cool; RCA; Warner Records
- Producer(s): D'Mile; Hey DJ
- Website: luckydaye.com

David Debrandon Brown (born September 25, 1985), professionally known as Lucky Daye, is an American singer-songwriter who works in the R&B genre. He signed with Keep Cool Records and RCA Records and released his first two extended plays entitled I (2018) and II (2019), leading to the release of his first studio album, Painted (2019). His third extended play, Table for Two (2021), won the Best Progressive R&B Album at the 64th Annual Grammy Awards.

His second studio album, Candydrip, was released in 2022. Brown earned his first Billboard Hot 100 chart with the song "Over" and released his third album, Algorithm, in 2024, which got nominated for Best R&B Album at the 67th Annual Grammy Awards, and its lead single "That’s You" won Best Traditional R&B Performance. In June 2026, Lucky signed a new record deal with Warner Records.

== Early life ==
David Debrandon Brown was born on September 25, 1985, in New Orleans, Louisiana. Brown was raised in a Christian background where non-religious music was forbidden. He therefore learned music by singing hymns. After leaving the church he had attended since his youth, Brown developed an interest in R&B, soul, and funk music. In an interview with W magazine, Brown said he derived his stage name from Marvin Gaye, adding an extra "e" to "Daye" after taking notice of the spelling of Gaye’s surname. He recalled listening repeatedly to Gaye’s "Let’s Get It On" before exploring his body of work. Following Hurricane Katrina, he moved to Tyler, Texas.

== Career ==
In 2005, when he was 19, Daye competed on season 4 of American Idol. He auditioned with a cover of "A Change Is Gonna Come" by Sam Cooke and received four "yes" votes. Soon after reaching the Top 20 he was eliminated from the competition.

Daye established himself, with his pseudonym, as a songwriter and background vocalist and landed credits in 2008 on songs by Keith Sweat on his album Just Me and Ne-Yo on "She Got Her Own". In 2014, he wrote for Boyz II Men on the song "Believe Us". During 2016 and 2017, he co-wrote songs released by Keke Palmer ("Enemiez"), Ella Mai ("10,000 Hours", "Down"), Trey Songz ("Song Goes Off"), and two tracks from the album Strength of a Woman by Mary J. Blige. In 2017 he worked with Ariana Grande on the song "More" which was scrapped from the latter's fourth studio album Sweetener.

In October 2018, Daye signed to Keep Cool Records and RCA Records, releasing his first single, "Roll Some Mo". On November 9, 2018, he released his first EP, I, which was part of a series leading up to his debut studio album Painted.

On January 17, 2019, Daye released the first single from his second EP, called "Karma". On February 6, 2019, he released the second installment of the EP series, II. He went on tour with Ella Mai beginning in February 2019. In November 2019, Daye received four nominations at the 62nd Grammy Awards including one for Best R&B Album for Painted. On November 21, 2019, Daye opened for R&B singer Khalid on his Free Spirit tour in New Zealand.

On September 25, 2020, he co-wrote "Better", English singer Zayn's single.

On February 12, 2021, Daye released his third EP, Table for Two. It charted at number ninety-six on the US Billboard 200 and would go on to win the 2022 Grammy Award for Best Progressive R&B Album.

On May 21, 2021, Daye released a cover of Marvin Gaye’s "Mercy Mercy Me (The Ecology)" to celebrate the 50th anniversary of Gaye's album What's Going On.

On March 10, 2022, Daye released his second studio album, Candydrip. The album received acclaim from critics and became his first album to chart on the US Billboard 200 album chart, debuting at number sixty-nine. Candydrip received a nomination for Best R&B Album while its lead single "Over" received a nod in the Best R&B Performance category for the 2023 edition of the Grammy Awards. In addition, he received two nominations for Album of the Year for both Beyoncé's Renaissance and Mary J. Blige's Good Morning Gorgeous albums as a co-writer, as well as a Best R&B Song nod for co-writing title track "Good Morning Gorgeous".

== Discography ==
=== Studio albums ===
- Painted (2019)
- Candydrip (2022)
- Algorithm (2024)
- ALOUD! (2026)

=== Extended plays ===
- Table for Two (2021)

== Tours ==
=== Headlining ===
- The Painted Tour (2019)
- The Candydrip World Tour (2022)
- The Algorithm Tour (2024)

=== Opening act ===
- Ella Mai – The Debut Tour (2019)
- Khalid – Free Spirit World Tour (Leg 3 - Oceania) (2019)
- Maxwell – The Serenade Tour (2025)

== Awards and nominations ==
Lucky Daye has been nominated for numerous awards including Grammy Awards, American Music Awards and Soul Train Awards. He currently holds two wins.

On September 8, 2024, Lucky received the Inaugural "Torchbearer Award" from Billboard Charts No.1s Party for being the "new age blueprint" in R&B after receiving his first No.1 hit as a lead artist with his single "That's You" on Adult R&B Songs chart.

Award	Year	Category	Work	Result	Ref.
American Music Award	2022	Favorite Soul/R&B Male Artist	Himself	Nominated	
BET Award	2022	Best Male R&B/Pop Artist	Himself	Nominated	
Grammy Award	2020	Best R&B Song	"Roll Some Mo"	Nominated	
Grammy Award	2020	Best R&B Performance	"Roll Some Mo"	Nominated	
Grammy Award	2020	Best R&B Album	Painted	Nominated	
Grammy Award	2020	Best Traditional R&B Performance	"Real Games"	Nominated	
Grammy Award	2022	Best Traditional R&B Performance	"How Much Can A Heart Take" (with Yebba)	Nominated	
Grammy Award	2022	Best Progressive R&B Album	Table for Two	Won	
Grammy Award	2023	Album of the Year	Renaissance (as songwriter)	Nominated	
Grammy Award	2023	Album of the Year	Good Morning Gorgeous (Deluxe) (as songwriter)	Nominated	
Grammy Award	2023	Best R&B Album	Candydrip	Nominated	
Grammy Award	2023	Best R&B Performance	"Over"	Nominated	
Grammy Award	2023	Best R&B Song	"Good Morning Gorgeous" (as songwriter)	Nominated	
Grammy Award	2025	Best R&B Album	Algorithm	Nominated	
Grammy Award	2025	Best Traditional R&B Performance	"That's You"	Won	
MTV Video Music Award	2023	Best R&B	"Stay" (with Alicia Keys)	Nominated	
MTV Video Music Award	2026	MTV Video Music Award for Best Collaboration	"Hard Part" (with Teyana Taylor)	Nominated	
NAACP Image Award	2020	Outstanding New Artist	Himself	Nominated	
NAACP Image Award	2024	Outstanding Duo, Group or Collaboration (Contemporary)	"Smoke" (with Victoria Monet)	Nominated	
Soul Train Music Award	2019	Best New Artist	Himself	Nominated	
Soul Train Music Award	2021	Best R&B/Soul Male Artist	Himself	Nominated	
Soul Train Music Award	2022	Best R&B/Soul Male Artist	Himself	Nominated	
