= Keep Cool Records =

Keep Cool
- Parent company: Sony Music Entertainment
- Founded: 2018
- Founder: Tunji Balogun; Courtney Stewart; Jon Tanners; Jared Sherman
- Distributor: RCA Records
- Genre: R&B; hip hop
- Country of origin: United States
- Location: Los Angeles, California
- Official website: keepcool.net

Keep Cool Records is an American record label founded by Tunji Balogun, alongside Right Hand Music Group founder Courtney Stewart, A&R Jon Tanners and marketing executive Jared Sherman. The label is a joint venture with RCA Records, a subsidiary of Sony Corporation of America.

== History ==
Tunji Balogun began working with RCA Records as an A&R representative, where he signed and developed artists Bryson Tiller, GoldLink, Khalid, Wizkid, and H.E.R. He was also involved in the partnership with RCA and Top Dawg Entertainment that signed SZA, bringing Cozz to Dreamville Records, as well as contributing in signing Childish Gambino to RCA. On April 9, 2018, RCA and Keep Cool announced the joint venture record label to sign and develop artists, promoting Tunji Balogun to executive vice president of A&R. Balogun spoke with Billboard about the deal saying: "I’m honored to be able to continue that legacy with the launch of Keep Cool. My passion is discovering and working with artists that are slightly left-of-center, and finding meaningful ways to organically build culture around them. Keep Cool will be a safe-haven for artists and creatives who want to do things differently." The same day, they announced the signing of Normani. In November 2018, they revealed the signings of Lucky Daye and duo VanJess. On February 20, 2019, Keep Cool announced a deal with hip hop duo Freddie Gibbs & Madlib for their second album Bandana. In May 2020, Keep Cool announced the signing of UMI to the label. In February 2021, Keep Cool announced the addition of Louisville-singer Marzz to the roster.

== Roster ==
=== Former artists ===
Act	Year signed	Releases under the label
Normani	2018	6
Lucky Daye	2018	5
VanJess	2018	2
Freddie Gibbs & Madlib	2019	1
UMI	2020	3
Marzz	2021	1

== Discography ==
=== Studio albums ===
Artist	Album	Details
Lucky Daye	Painted	Released: May 24, 2019; Label: Keep Cool / RCA Records; Formats: Digital download
Freddie Gibbs & Madlib	Bandana	Released: June 28, 2019; Label: Keep Cool, RCA Records, Madlib Invazion, ESGN; Formats: Digital download
VanJess	Silk Canvas (Remixes)	Released: November 8, 2019; Label: Keep Cool / RCA Records; Formats: Digital download
Lucky Daye	Candydrip	Released: March 10, 2022; Label: Keep Cool / RCA Records; Format: Digital download

=== Extended plays ===
Extended plays

Artist	Extended play	Details
Lucky Daye	I	Released: November 9, 2018; Label: Keep Cool / RCA Records; Formats: Digital download
Lucky Daye	II	Released: February 6, 2019; Label: Keep Cool / RCA Records; Formats: Digital download
UMI	Introspection	Released: June 21, 2020; Label: Keep Cool / RCA Records; Formats: Digital download
VanJess	Homegrown	Released: 5 February 2021; Label: Keep Cool, RCA; Format: Digital download, streaming
Lucky Daye	Table For Two	Released: February 12, 2021; Label: Keep Cool / RCA; Format: Digital download
Marzz	Love Letterz	Released: June 19, 2021; Label: Keep Cool / RCA; Format: Digital download
