= Painted (Lucky Daye album) =

Studio album by Lucky Daye
- Released: May 24, 2019
- Recorded: 2016–2017
- Genre: R&B; soul; funk
- Length: 57:59
- Label: Keep Cool; RCA
- Producer: D'Mile; DJ Camper

Lucky Daye chronology
II (2019)	Painted (2019)	Candydrip (2022)

Singles from Painted
- 1. "Roll Some Mo" Released: October 24, 2018; 2. "Karma" Released: January 17, 2019; 3. "Love You Too Much" Released: April 25, 2019

Painted is the debut studio album by American singer Lucky Daye. It was released on May 24, 2019, by Keep Cool Records and RCA Records. The album was broken up into two EP's, a part of a series to lead up to his debut album.

The album received a nomination for Best R&B Album at the 62nd Grammy Awards, while the album's lead single "Roll Some Mo" received nominations for Best R&B Song and Best R&B Performance. Album cut "Real Games" received a nomination in the Best Traditional R&B Performance category. In honor of the album's first anniversary, a deluxe edition of Painted was released in May 2020 including new mixes and alternative versions of previously released songs as well as four new tracks.

== Background ==
After he previously competed on American Idol during Season 4 in 2005, at age 19, Daye established himself as a songwriter and background vocalist between 2008- 2018. During this time he wrote for many artists, most notably Ne-Yo, Keith Sweat, Boyz II Men, Joe (singer), August Alsina, Mary J. Blige and Ella Mai, among other contemporary R&B artists.

In October 2018, Daye signed to Keep Cool Records and RCA Records, releasing his first single, "Roll Some Mo", which is now certified Gold by the RIAA. On November 9, 2018, he released his first EP, I, which was part of a series leading up to his debut studio album Painted.

On January 17, 2019, Daye released the first single from his second EP, called "Karma". On February 6, 2019, he released the second installment of the EP series, II. He went on tour with Ella Mai beginning in February 2019.

On May 24, 2019, Lucky Daye released his debut album, which consisted of all of the songs from his EPs I and II plus the final four additional tracks. All of the songs were written by Lucky Daye, and were executive produced by D'Mile, recorded between 2016- 2017. Of the 15 they finished, 13 appear on the album. Painted was made over a nine month period. In a 2020 interview with “Nation of Billions”, Lucky states, “It was interesting because it was 9 months but 14 sessions, so at every session I had to hit it out the park. There was no room for error.”

In September 2019, he went on his first headlining tour, The Painted Tour, to support the album.

In November 2019, Daye received four nominations at the 62nd Grammy Awards off his debut, including one for Best R&B Album for Painted.

== Singles ==
In October 2018, Lucky Daye announced that he was signed to the RCA joint venture Keep Cool, and released his first single called "Roll Some Mo". On January 17, 2019, Lucky Daye released the second single called "Karma". "Love You Too Much" was released as the third and final single on April 25, 2019.

== Song meaning ==
Daye has opened up about the meaning of a couple of his songs from the album in previous interviews.

In a 2019 interview with 2DopeBoyz, Lucky reveals that the song single "Karma" from his debut album is dedicated to a friend of his that committed suicide. Lucky stated, "People think it’s like “Oh it’s karma, she keeps coming around,” but it’s like she left me like literally, left me on Earth."

His song "Concentrate" is a double entendre. In a 2020 interview with "Nation of Billions", he states, "...on ‘Concentrate’ I had a friend who I would spend time with and we started getting creative cos he did music too. And over time, he fell in love with me. So it was like “oh damn” I don’t wanna stop working *laughs* like damn. So for me it was like let’s just concentrate, I respect that and appreciate it but *laughs*.”

== Track listing ==
No.	Title	Writer(s)	Producer(s)	Length
1.	"Roll Some Mo"	David Brown; Dernst Emile II; Peter Lee Johnson	D'Mile	4:52
2.	"Late Night"	Brown; Emile	D'Mile	3:57
3.	"Extra"	Brown; Emile; Dustin Bowie	D'Mile; DJ Camper	5:53
4.	"Concentrate"	Brown; Emile; Johnson	D'Mile	3:36
5.	"Ready for Love (Interlude)"	Brown; Emile; Johnson	D'Mile	1:49
6.	"Karma"	Brown; Emile; Bowie; Stephen Garrett; Elgin Lumpkin; Timothy Mosley	D'Mile	3:04
7.	"Paint It"	Brown; Bowie; Emile	D'Mile	4:12
8.	"Real Games"	Brown; Emile	D'Mile	5:31
9.	"Misunderstood"	Brown; Emile; Darhyl Camper; Donnell Shawn Butler	D'Mile	4:07
10.	"Floods"	Brown; Emile; Johnson	D'Mile	5:25
11.	"Call"	Brown; Emile; Camper	D'Mile; DJ Camper	3:31
12.	"Try Your Fire"	Brown; Emile	D'Mile	4:17
13.	"Love You Too Much"	Brown; Camper; Butler	D'Mile; DJ Camper	7:45
Total length:				57:59

2020 Deluxe edition
No.	Title	Writer(s)	Producers (s)	Length
14.	"Roll Some Mo" (featuring Chronixx & MediSun)	Brown; Emile; Johnson; Jamar McNaughton; Glenford Lee Prospere	D'Mile	3:35
15.	"Fade Away"	Brown; Emile; Bowie; Michael L. McGregor; Johnson; Carlin White	D'Mile	3:40
16.	"Buying Time"	Brown; Emile	D'Mile	3:57
17.	"Little More Time" (featuring Victoria Monet)	Brown; Emile; Victoria McCants	D'Mile	4:08
18.	"Shoulda" (featuring Babyface)	Brown; Emile; Kenneth Edmonds; Daryl Simmons; Bo Watson	D'Mile	3:37
19.	"Misunderstood (Live in New Orleans)"	Brown; Emile; Camper; Butler	D'Mile	4:13
Total length:				90:00
