= Candydrip =

2022 album by Lucky Daye

Studio album by Lucky Daye
- Released: March 10, 2022
- Genre: R&B
- Length: 57:37
- Label: Keep Cool; RCA
- Producer: D'Mile

Lucky Daye chronology
Painted (2019)	Candydrip (2022)	Algorithm (2024)

Singles from Candydrip
- 1. "Over" Released: September 22, 2021; 2. "Candy Drip" Released: December 7, 2021; 3. "NWA" Released: February 18, 2022

Professional ratings
Review scores
Source	Rating
AllMusic	4.5/5 stars
Pitchfork	7.2/10
Soul in Stereo	4/5 stars
Clash	7/10

Candydrip is the second studio album by American singer-songwriter Lucky Daye, released on Keep Cool Records and RCA Records on March 10, 2022. The album reached number 69 on the Billboard 200 chart. It features collaborations with Smino, Lil Durk, Chiiild and Alex Isley, and is produced by D'Mile. The song "Guess" samples "U Don't Have to Call" by Usher.

== Release ==
Lucky Daye announced the deluxe version of the album on November 16, along with the release of a music video for the original album track "Fuckin' Sound" directed by Kanya Iwana. The deluxe album released December 9, featuring four additional songs including the "original version" of "NWA" as well as "These Signs" and "Apply Pressure".

== Style ==
The album, like Lucky Daye's previous work, is considered contemporary R&B. It is said to expand on his sound "only slightly", with the typical laidback vibe and "tasteful" instrumentation infused with "gently plucked acoustic guitar and cinematic strings alongside textural pitch-shifted vocals and rhythmic backbeats" by producer D'Mile. The album takes influence from Soundcloud rap's lo-fi qualities, with some tracks such as "NWA" incorporating elements of trap.

== Track listing ==
No.	Title	Length
1.	"Intro"	1:53
2.	"God Body" (featuring Smino)	3:21
3.	"Feels Like"	3:29
4.	"NWA" (featuring Lil Durk)	3:51
5.	"Guess"	3:13
6.	"Candy Drip (Interlude)"	1:55
7.	"Candy Drip"	4:40
8.	"Deserve"	4:39
9.	"Interlude"	0:31
10.	"Over"	3:27
11.	"Fuckin' Sound"	2:44
12.	"Compassion" (featuring Chiiild)	4:22
13.	"Touch Somebody (Interlude)"	1:37
14.	"Used To Be"	4:01
15.	"Fever"	4:00
16.	"Cherry Forest"	4:00
17.	"Ego"	5:50
Total length:		57:37

Candydrip (Deluxe) additional tracks
No.	Title	Writer(s)	Producers	Length
18.	"These Signs"	Brown; Dustin Bowie; McGregor; D'Mile	D'Mile	3:50
19.	"Apply Pressure"	Brown; Dustin Bowie; Jon Wienner; McGregor; Sam Homaee	D'Mile; Wienner; Homaee	3:14
20.	"Magic"	Brown; Aidan Rodriguez; Mark Landon; Tim Suby	M-Phazes; Suby	4:45
21.	"NWA (Original Version)"	Brown; Emile	Brown; D'Mile	3:39
Total length:				73:03

== Charts ==
Chart performance for Candydrip
Chart (2023)	Peak position
US Billboard 200	69
US Top R&B/Hip-Hop Albums (Billboard)	39
