= Unaired =

EP by Hozier
- Released: 16 August 2024
- Genre: Pop
- Label: Rubyworks

Hozier chronology
Unheard (2024)	Unaired (2024)

Singles from Unaired
- 1. "Nobody's Soldier" Released: 16 August 2024

Unaired is the eighth extended play by Irish musician Hozier.

== Background ==
As with Hozier's previous EP Unheard, Unaired was recorded during the sessions for Hozier's 2023 album Unreal Unearth, but didn't make the final track listing.

== Songs ==
"Nobody's Soldier" is a song about not wanting to be in "destructive systems", as Hozier described it himself during an interview at Osheaga Festival. "July" was written by Hozier while he was waiting for the pandemic to end.

== Artwork ==
The album artwork for Unaired is similar to that of Unheard, in that it shows Hozier laying in dirt, but instead of Hozier laying on his side, he is laying on his back.

== Release and promotion ==
None of the tracks on the EP were made available prior to its release except for "Nobody's Soldier", but American magazine Variety was able to determine that "July" and "That You Are" were the other tracks on the EP a week before it was released. Hozier filmed a music video for the EP's only single "Nobody's Soldier".

== Reception ==
Professional ratings
Review scores
Source	Rating
The Irish Times	4/5 stars

In a 4 star review of Unaired, Ed Power of the Irish Times wrote that "Nobody's Soldier" "has an irresistible tectonic quality" and praising how it "searingly captures the dread bound up in so much of modern existence – a sense of trepidation rising through the music before he reaches the chorus".

== Track listing ==
All tracks are written by Andrew Hozier-Byrne, additional songwriters listed with Hozier-Byrne on tracks 1 and 3.

No.	Title	Writer(s)	Producer	Length
1.	"Nobody's Soldier"	Hozier-Byrne; Tannenbaum; Chakra; Johnson; Gherman; Pete G	Tannenbaum; Pete G; Chakra; Gherman	3:57
2.	"July"	Hozier-Byrne	Jeff Gitelman	3:55
3.	"That You Are" (feat. Bedouine)	Hozier-Byrne; Bedouine	Gus Seyffert	4:16

== Credits and personnel ==
Songs credits are adapted from Apple Music.

=== Nobody's Soldier ===
==== Musicians ====
- Andrew Hozier-Byrne – vocals, songwriter
- Daniel Tannenbaum – strings, background vocals, organ, programming, songwriter
- Stuart Johnson – drums, percussion, background vocals, songwriter
- Peter Gonzales – drums, percussion, programming, background vocals, songwriter, vocal recording engineer
- Daniel Krieger – guitar, bass, songwriter, songwriter, vocal recording engineer
- Budapest Symphony Orchestra – strings, horn
- Danielle Withers, Aretha Scruggs, Nayanna Holley, Toni Scruggs, Fletcher Sheridan, Charles Jones, Kadeem Nichols, David Simmonds, Gregory Fletcher – choir

==== Production ====
- Sergiu Gherman – programming, songwriter, producer
- Bekon – producer
- Pete G – producer
- Matt Anthony – recording engineer
- Andrew Scheps – mixing engineer
- Greg Calbi – mastering engineer
- Steve Fallone – mastering engineer
- Chakra – producer

=== July ===
==== Musicians ====
- Andrew Hozier-Byrne – vocals, songwriter, producer
- Jeff "Gitty" Gitelman – bass, synthesizer, acoustic guitar, piano, synthesizer programming, baritone guitar, songwriter, producer, recording engineer
- Stanley Randolph – drums
- Lisa McCormick – French horn
- Roland Garcia – percussion

==== Production ====
- R.J. Cardenas – recording engineer
- Andrew Scheps – mixing engineer
- Greg Calbi – mastering engineer
- Steve Fallone – mastering engineer

=== That You Are ===
==== Musicians/songwriters ====
- Andrew Hozier-Byrne – vocals, songwriter
- Bedouine – vocals, guitar
- Gus Seyffert – bass, keyboards, percussion
- Azniv Korkejian – songwriter

==== Production ====
- Gus Seyffert – producer, recording engineer, mixing engineer
- Chris Szczech – recording engineer
- Greg Calbi – mastering engineer
- Steve Fallone – mastering engineer
