= Troubadour (disambiguation) =

A troubadour was a composer and performer of Old Occitan, mainly spoken in [Southern France, lyric poetry during the High Middle Ages, from the 8th to the 14th centuries.

Troubadour, or variants, may also refer to:

== Music ==
- The Troubadours, an English rock band
- The Troubadors, a 1950s American band that backed Jane Morgan on her 1957 recording of "Fascination."
- Troubadour (George Strait album), 2008
  - "Troubadour" (song)
- Troubadour (J. J. Cale album), 1976
- Troubadour (K'naan album), 2009
- Troubadour (The Stepkids album), 2013
- Troubadour: The Definitive Collection 1964–1976, a 1992 compilation album by Donovan
- "Troubadours", a song by Van Morrison from the 1979 album Into the Music
- "The Troubadour", a song by A. C. Newman from the 2012 album Shut Down the Streets
- Troubadour Music Inc., Raffi's music label
- "De troubadour", one of the four winners of the Eurovision Song Contest 1969

== Venues ==
- Troubadour (London nightclub), a coffee house and music venue
- Troubadour (West Hollywood, California), a night club and music venue
- Bristol Troubadour Club, a former British music venue

== Other uses ==
- Troubadour (horse) (1882–1906), an American Thoroughbred racehorse
- Troubador, a fictional character in the Oh My Goddess anime/manga series
- Troubador, a poet of the Galician-Portuguese lyric movement
- Troubador Press, a San Francisco book publishing company founded by Malcolm Whyte
- Il trovatore ('The Troubador'), an opera by Giuseppe Verdi

== See also ==
- Live at the Troubadour (disambiguation)
- Trobairitz, a female troubadour
- Twoubadou, a Haitian folk music genre
- Troubadour, TX, an American documentary television series
