= NAACP Image Award for Outstanding Album =

American music award

This article lists the winners and nominees for the NAACP Image Award for Outstanding Album. This award has been given since the 1988 ceremony and since its conception, Beyoncé holds the record for most wins in this category with five, including winning for the soundtracks to Dreamgirls: Music from the Motion Picture. Whitney Houston holds the record for most consecutive wins with three, winning for the soundtracks to The Bodyguard, Waiting to Exhale and The Preacher's Wife back to back to back.

== Winners and nominees ==
Winners are listed first and highlighted in bold.

=== 1980s ===
Year	Artist	Album	Ref
1988
1988	**Michael Jackson**	**Bad**	
1988	Pebbles	Pebbles	
1988	Kool Moe Dee	How Ya Like Me Now	
1988	Keith Sweat	Make It Last Forever	
1988	Stevie Wonder	Characters	
1989
1989	**Anita Baker**	**Giving You the Best That I Got**	
1989	Gerald Albright	Bermuda Nights	
1989	Maze Featuring Frankie Beverly	Silky Soul	
1989	Soul II Soul	Keep On Movin'	
1989	Various Artists	Do the Right Thing	

=== 1990s ===
Year	Artist	Album	Ref
1990
1990	**Quincy Jones**	**Back on the Block**	
1991	—N/a		
1992
1992	**Luther Vandross**	**Power of Love**	
1992	Boyz II Men	Cooleyhighharmony	
1992	Stevie Wonder	Jungle Fever	
1992	Natalie Cole	Unforgettable... with Love	
1992	Various Artists	New Jack City	
1993
1993	**Various Artists**	**Boomerang**	
1994
1994	**Whitney Houston**	**The Bodyguard: Original Soundtrack Album**	
1995	—N/a		
1996
1996	**Whitney Houston**	**Waiting to Exhale: Original Soundtrack Album**	
1996	Brandy	Brandy	
1996	TLC	CrazySexyCool	
1996	Boyz II Men	II	
1996	Quincy Jones	Q's Jook Joint	
1997
1997	**Whitney Houston**	**The Preacher's Wife: Original Soundtrack Album**	
1997	Prince	Emancipation	
1997	Maxwell	Maxwell's Urban Hang Suite	
1997	Curtis Mayfield	New World Order	
1997	Fugees	The Score	
1998
1998	**Various Artists**	**Soul Food**	
1999
1999	**Lauryn Hill**	**The Miseducation of Lauryn Hill**	
1999	Mariah Carey	#1's	
1999	Whitney Houston	My Love is Your Love	
1999	Brandy	Never Say Never	
1999	Kirk Franklin	The Nu Nation Project	

=== 2000s ===
Year	Artist	Album	Ref
2000
2000	**Various Artists**	**The Best Man**	
2000	Eric Benét	A Day in the Life	
2000	Mary J. Blige	Mary	
2000	Quincy Jones	From Q with Love	
2000	TLC	FanMail	
2001
2001	**Stevie Wonder**	**At the Close of a Century**	
2001	Toni Braxton	The Heat	
2001	Natalie Cole	Greatest Hits, Vol. 1	
2001	Joe	My Name is Joe	
2001	Jill Scott	Who Is Jill Scott? Words and Sounds Vol. 1	
2002
2002	**Alicia Keys**	**Songs in A Minor**	
2002	Aaliyah	Aaliyah	
2002	India Arie	Acoustic Soul	
2002	Michael Jackson	Invincible	
2002	Jill Scott	Experience: Jill Scott 826+	
2003
2003	**Kirk Franklin**	**The Rebirth of Kirk Franklin**	
2003	India Arie	Voyage to India	
2003	Nelly	Nellyville	
2003	Musiq Soulchild	Juslisen	
2003	Various Artists	Brown Sugar	
2004
2004	**Luther Vandross**	**Dance with My Father**	
2004	Mary J. Blige	Love & Life	
2004	R. Kelly	Chocolate Factory	
2004	Alicia Keys	The Diary of Alicia Keys	
2004	OutKast	Speakerboxxx/The Love Below	
2005
2005	**Prince**	**Musicology**	
2005	Destiny's Child	Destiny Fulfilled	
2005	Queen Latifah	The Dana Owens Album	
2005	Usher	Confessions	
2006
2006	**Mariah Carey**	**The Emancipation of Mimi**	
2006	Mary J. Blige	The Breakthrough	
2006	Alicia Keys	Unplugged	
2006	Various Artists	So Amazing: An All-Star Tribute to Luther Vandross	
2006	Kanye West	Late Registration	
2007
2007	**Various Artists**	**Dreamgirls: Music from the Motion Picture**	
2007	Beyoncé	B'Day	
2007	Mary J. Blige	Reflections: A Retrospective	
2007	John Legend	Once Again	
2007	Corinne Bailey Rae	Corinne Bailey Rae	
2008
2008	**Alicia Keys**	**As I Am**	
2008	Mary J. Blige	Growing Pains	
2008	Chris Brown	Exclusive	
2008	Seal	System	
2008	Kanye West	Graduation	
2009
2009	**Jennifer Hudson**	**Jennifer Hudson**	
2009	Beyoncé	I Am... Sasha Fierce	
2009	Ne-Yo	Year of the Gentleman	
2009	Seal	Soul	
2009	Kanye West	808 & Heartbreak	

=== 2010s ===
Year	Artist	Album	Ref
2010
2010	**Mary J. Blige**	**Stronger with Each Tear**	
2010	Mariah Carey	Memoirs of an Imperfect Angel	
2010	Jay Z	The Blueprint 3	
2010	Alicia Keys	The Element of Freedom	
2010	Maxwell	BLACKsummers'night	
2011
2011	**John Legend and The Roots**	**Wake Up!**	
2011	Smokey Robinson	Now and Then	
2011	Sade	Soldier of Love	
2011	Usher	Raymond vs. Raymond	
2011	Kanye West	My Beautiful Dark Twisted Fantasy	
2012
2012	**Jennifer Hudson**	**I Remember Me**	
2012	Beyoncé	4	
2012	Chris Brown	F.A.M.E.	
2012	Lupe Fiasco	Lasers	
2012	Jill Scott	The Light of the Sun	
2013
2013	**Whitney Houston**	**I Will Always Love You: The Best of Whitney Houston**	
2013	Chuck D, Herbie Hancock, will.i.am and Nikki Yanofsky	On the Shoulders of Giants	
2013	Michael Jackson	Bad 25	
2013	Alicia Keys	Girl on Fire	
2013	Elle Varner	Perfectly Imperfect	
2014
2014	**Charlie Wilson**	**Love, Charlie**	
2014	John Legend	Love in the Future	
2014	Janelle Monáe	The Electric Lady	
2014	Robin Thicke	Blurred Lines	
2014	Justin Timberlake	The 20/20 Experience – The Complete Experience	
2015
2015	**Aretha Franklin**	**Aretha Franklin Sings the Great Diva Classics**	
2015	Beyoncé	Beyoncé: Platinum Edition	
2015	Toni Braxton and Babyface	Love, Marriage & Divorce	
2015	Jennifer Hudson	JHUD	
2015	Pharrell Williams	GIRL	
2016
2016	**Jill Scott**	**Woman**	
2016	Empire Cast	Empire: Original Soundtrack from Season 1	
2016	Janet Jackson	Unbreakable	
2016	The Weeknd	Beauty Behind the Madness	
2016	Charlie Wilson	Forever Charlie	
2017
2017	**Beyoncé**	**Lemonade**	
2017	Chance the Rapper	Coloring Book	
2017	Anthony Hamilton	What I'm Feelin'	
2017	Kendrick Lamar	Untitled Unmastered	
2017	Solange	A Seat at the Table	
2018
2018	**Kendrick Lamar**	**Damn**	
2018	Mary J. Blige	Strength of a Woman	
2018	JAY-Z	4:44	
2018	Brian McKnight	Genesis	
2018	Charlie Wilson	In It to Win It	
2019
2019	**Ella Mai**	**Ella Mai**	
2019	Janelle Monáe	Dirty Computer	
2019	MAJOR.	Even More	
2019	The Carters	Everything Is Love	
2019	H.E.R.	I Used to Know Her: The Prelude	

=== 2020s ===
Year	Artist	Album	Ref
2020
2020	**Beyoncé**	**Homecoming: The Live Album**	
2020	Lizzo	Cuz I Love You	
2020	H.E.R.	I Used to Know Her	
2020	Fantasia	Sketchbook	
2020	India Arie	Worthy	
2021
2021	**Jhené Aiko**	**Chilombo**	
2021	Alicia Keys	Alicia	
2021	Brandy	B7	
2021	John Legend	Bigger Love	
2021	Ledisi	The Wild Card	
2022
2022	**Jazmine Sullivan**	**Heaux Tales**	
2022	Silk Sonic	An Evening with Silk Sonic	
2022	H.E.R.	Back of My Mind	
2022	Drake	Certified Lover Boy	
2022	Giveon	When It's All Said and Done... Take Time	
2023
2023	**Beyoncé**	**Renaissance**	
2023	Ari Lennox	Age/Sex/Location	
2023	Chris Brown	Breezy (Deluxe)	
2023	Kendrick Lamar	Mr. Morale & the Big Steppers	
2023	PJ Morton	Watch the Sun	
2024
2024	**Victoria Monét**	**Jaguar II**	
2024	Summer Walker	Clear 2: Soft Life EP	
2024	Drake	For All the Dogs	
2024	Burna Boy	I Told Them...	
2024	Janelle Monáe	The Age of Pleasure	
2025
2025	**Beyoncé**	**Cowboy Carter**	
2025	Doechii	Alligator Bites Never Heal	
2025	PJ Morton	Cape Town to Cairo	
2025	Usher	Coming Home	
2025	GloRilla	Glorious	
2026
2026	**Cardi B**	**Am I the Drama?**	
2026	Giveon	Beloved	
2026	Clipse, Pusha T, Malice	Let God Sort Em Out	
2026	Leon Thomas	Mutt Deluxe: Heel	
2026	SZA	SOS Deluxe: Lana	

== Multiple wins and nominations ==
=== Wins ===
5 wins

- Beyoncé (Includes Dreamgirls Soundtrack winning in 2007)

4 wins

- Whitney Houston

2 wins

- Jennifer Hudson
- Alicia Keys

=== Nominations ===
8 nominations

- Beyoncé

7 nominations

- Alicia Keys

6 nominations

- Mary J. Blige

5 nominations

- Whitney Houston

4 nominations

- John Legend
- Jill Scott
- Kanye West

3 nominations

- Brandy
- Chris Brown
- H.E.R.
- Jennifer Hudson
- India Arie
- Michael Jackson
- Kendrick Lamar
- Janelle Monáe
- Usher

2 nominations

- Toni Braxton
- Mariah Carey
- Drake
- Giveon
- PJ Morton
- Seal
- Luther Vandross
- Charlie Wilson
