= I Used to Know Her: Part 2 =

EP by H.E.R.
- Released: November 2, 2018
- Length: 28:46
- Label: RCA
- Producer: T-Minus; Dernst "D'Mile" Emile II; Rodney Jerkins; Flippa; Gitty; David "Swagg R'Celious" Harris; Craig Balmoris; Bēkon; Rappy

H.E.R. chronology
I Used to Know Her: The Prelude (2018)	I Used to Know Her: Part 2 (2018)	I Used to Know Her (2019)

Singles from I Used to Know Her: Part 2
- 1. "Hard Place" Released: April 4, 2019

I Used to Know Her: Part 2 is the fifth EP by American singer H.E.R., released on November 2, 2018, by RCA Records. It is the sequel to her previous EP, I Used to Know Her: The Prelude, also released in 2018.

== Singles and promotion ==
On April 4, 2019, she released the music video for "Hard Place". She also performed the song live on The Late Show with Stephen Colbert, and the 2019 Grammy Awards.

== Critical reception ==
Jackson Howard of Pitchfork gave a mixed review of the EP saying "Questionable sequencing otherwise plagues I Used to Know Her. The 15 collected songs of Volume 1 and Volume 2 bled into one another, a collage of intimate snapshots inside the H.E.R. orbit," and "The growing pains are evident. But at least H.E.R. is venturing into new subject matter."

== Track listing ==
No.	Title	Writer(s)	Producer(s)	Length
1.	"Carried Away"	Gabi Wilson; Dernst Emile II; Keithen Foster; Sam Ashworth	T-Minus	3:41
2.	"Can’t Help Me"	Wilson; Ronald Colson; Jeff Gitelman; Sam Ashworth	Gitty; Flippa	2:53
3.	"I'm Not OK"	Wilson; Sam Ashworth	Swagg R’Celious; D'Mile	3:26
4.	"Take You There"	Wilson; Ali P; Modesty Lycan; Edwin Elijah Diaz	Flippa; Gitty	4:02
5.	"Going (Interlude)"	Wilson; Harris; SoundzFire	D'Mile	1:16
6.	"Hard Place"	Wilson; Harris; Ruby Amanfu	Rodney Jerkins	4:32
7.	"Fate"	Wilson; Ashworth; Harris; Ruby Amanfu	Craig Balmoris; Bēkon; Rappy	3:13
8.	"Lord Is Coming"	Wilson; Alanna Boudreau	Craig Balmoris; Bēkon; Rappy	5:43

== Charts ==
Chart (2018)	Peak position
US Billboard 200	87
US Top R&B/Hip-Hop Albums (Billboard)	48
