= Unheard (EP) =

EP by Hozier
- Released: 22 March 2024
- Genre: Folk blues
- Length: 13:59
- Label: Rubyworks; Columbia
- Producer: Andrew Hozier-Byrne; Bekon; Chakra; Pete G; Jeff Gitelman; Craig Balmoris; Sergiu Gherman; Tyler Mehlenbacher; Jennifer Decilveo

Hozier chronology
Unreal Unearth (2023)	Unheard (2024)	Unaired (2024)

Singles from Unheard
- 1. "Too Sweet" Released: 22 March 2024

Unheard is the seventh extended play (EP) by Irish musician Hozier. It was released on 22 March 2024 by Rubyworks Records and Columbia Records. It consists of four previously unreleased songs that were recorded for Hozier's third studio album Unreal Unearth (2023), but did not make the final track listing. Of the unreleased material, Hozier said in a statement that the four songs "might've made it to the circles of gluttony, limbo, violence and the outward 'ascent'", referring to Dante's Inferno, which was the inspiration for Unreal Unearth, but they did not appear on the album "for different reasons".

== Critical reception ==
Professional ratings
Review scores
Source	Rating
AllMusic	3/5 stars
Racket Magazine	Positive

AllMusic rated the EP three out of five stars, with Timothy Monger naming "Wildflower and Barley" as the best track and regarding the EP as "alternate, but familiar takes on the signature bluesy folk vamps that have built his career." Racket Magazine praised the musical composition as "lyrics that make you think...surrounded by tremendously interesting musical arrangements".

== Track listing ==
Unheard track listing
No.	Title	Writer(s)	Producer(s)	Length
1.	"Too Sweet"	Andrew Hozier-Byrne; Daniel Krieger; Daniel Tannenbaum; Peter Gonzales; Sergiu Gherman; Stuart Johnson; Tyler Mehlenbacher	Hozier-Byrne; Bekon; Chakra; Pete G; Gherman^{[a]}	4:11
2.	"Wildflower and Barley" (with Allison Russell)	Hozier-Byrne; Allison Russell; Jeff Gitelman	Hozier-Byrne; Gitelman	3:42
3.	"Empire Now"	Hozier-Byrne; Craig Balmoris; Krieger; Tannenbaum; Marius Felder; Gonzales; Gherman; Johnson; Mehlenbacher	Bekon; Chakra; Balmoris; Pete G; Gherman; Mehlenbacher	2:58
4.	"Fare Well"	Hozier-Byrne	Hozier-Byrne; Jennifer Decilveo	3:08
Total length:				13:59

== Personnel ==
Musicians

- Andrew Hozier-Byrne – vocals (all tracks), acoustic guitar (track 2), guitar (4)
- Daniel Tannenbaum – backing vocals, strings (tracks 1, 3); keyboards, drum programming, Farfisa, Mellotron (1); synthesizer (3)
- Daniel Krieger – bass, guitar (tracks 1, 3)
- Peter Gonzales – chimes, drums, Farfisa, percussion (track 1); synthesizer (2)
- Stuart Johnson – drums, percussion (track 1)
- Jeff Gitelman – acoustic guitar, bass, organ, synthesizer (track 2)
- Stanley Randolph – drums (track 2)
- Lisa McCormick – French horn (track 2)
- Roland Garcia – percussion (2)
- Allison Russell – vocals (track 2)
- Tyler Mehlenbacher – bass (track 3)
- Jordan Seigel – conductor (track 3)
- Budapest Strings Chamber Orchestra – strings (track 3)
- Jennifer Decilveo – drum machine, piano, synthesizer (track 4)
- Sam KS – drums (track 4)
- David Levita – guitar (track 4)

Technical

- Greg Calbi – mastering
- Steve Fallone – mastering
- Andrew Scheps – mixing (tracks 1, 2, 4)
- Peter Gonzales – mixing (track 3), vocal engineering (1), programming (3)
- Daniel Krieger – engineering (track 1), programming (1), vocal engineering (3)
- Tyler Mehlenbacher – engineering (track 1)
- Jeff Gitelman – engineering (track 2)
- RJ Cardenas – engineering (track 2)
- Matt Anthony – engineering (track 3)
- Jennifer Decilveo – engineering, programming (track 4)
- Sean Cook – vocal engineering (track 3)
- Sergiu Gherman – programming (track 3)
- Logan Taylor – engineering assistance (track 3)

== Charts ==
=== Weekly charts ===
Weekly chart performance for Unheard
Chart (2024)	Peak position
Canadian Albums (Billboard)	8
Portuguese Albums (AFP)	86
Swiss Albums (Schweizer Hitparade)	57
US Billboard 200	10
US Americana/Folk Albums (Billboard)	3
US Top Rock & Alternative Albums (Billboard)	4

=== Year-end charts ===
Year-end chart performance for Unheard
Chart (2024)	Position
US Billboard 200	127
US Top Rock & Alternative Albums (Billboard)	27
