= Sweet Salvation =

Sweet Salvation may refer to:

- "Sweet Salvation", a song by the Cult from the album Ceremony, 1991
- "Sweet Salvation", a song by Stephanie Mills from the album Movin' in the Right Direction, 1974
- "Sweet Salvation", a song by the Stepkids from the album Troubadour, 2013
- Sweet Salvation, a 2014 album by The Last Vegas
- "Sweet Salvation", an audio play in the Big Finish Doctor Who series
