= Eat Your Young =

EP by Hozier
- Released: 17 March 2023
- Genre: Soul; blues rock; folk
- Length: 11:23
- Label: Rubyworks; Columbia
- Producer: Hozier; Bekon; Chakra; Pete G; Sergiu Gherman; Jeff Gitelman

Hozier chronology
Wasteland, Baby! (2019)	Eat Your Young (2023)	Unreal Unearth (2023)

Singles from Eat Your Young
- 1. "Eat Your Young" Released: 17 March 2023

Eat Your Young is the sixth extended play (EP) by Irish singer-songwriter Hozier. The three-track collection was released on 17 March 2023 through Rubyworks Records, to celebrate the singer's birthday, St. Patrick's Day, the ten-year anniversary of his debut, and to tease his then-upcoming third studio album Unreal Unearth. At the time of the EP's release, all three of its songs were slated to appear on Unreal Unearth, though "Through Me (The Flood)" ultimately was absent from the album. Hozier performed the EP in full in a set on NPR's World Cafe on 18 March 2023.

The title track was released as a single the same day and debuted at number seven on the Irish Singles Chart and number 67 on the Billboard Hot 100. For the latter, it became Hozier's second entry on the chart, with the first being the breakout single "Take Me to Church" in 2014. "Eat Your Young" also became Hozier's third song to top the US Adult Alternative Airplay charts. The title track's music video, directed by Jason Lester and starring Ivanna Sakhno was released on 5 April 2023, followed by a video for "All Things End" on 27 April 2023.

== Reception ==
In a review for Mxdwn, Blake Michelle praised the songwriting of the EP, writing "The title track falls into the same category of 'Take Me to Church,' in using a mix of religious and sexual imagery to create social commentary—in this case, consumption and prioritizing war profits over alleviating poverty. It turns the need to produce and consume into an almost demonic urge, fitting for a song based on the Gluttony level of hell. The following two songs stare into the abyss, and yet find comfort in the knowledge that everything is temporary."

== Track listing ==
Eat Your Young track listing
No.	Title	Writer(s)	Producer(s)	Length
1.	"Eat Your Young"	Andrew Hozier-Byrne; Daniel Tannenbaum; Craig Balmoris; Daniel Krieger; Marius Fedor; Peter Gonzales; Sergiu Gherman; Stuart Johnson; Tyler Mehlenbacher	Gherman; Bekon; Pete G; Chakra; Hozier-Byrne	4:02
2.	"All Things End"	Tannenbaum; Hozier-Byrne; Krieger; Gonzales; Gherman; Johnson	Gherman; Bekon; Pete G; Chakra	3:33
3.	"Through Me (The Flood)"	Hozier-Byrne	Jeff "Gitty" Gitelman	3:47
Total length:				11:23

== Personnel ==
=== Musicians ===
- Hozier – lead vocals (all tracks)
- Craig Balmoris – drum programming (track 1)
- Bekon – background vocals (track 1), organ (track 1,) piano (tracks 1–2), strings (tracks 1–2), synthesizer (tracks 1–2)
- Amanda Brown – background vocals (track 3)
- Darien Dorsey – organ (track 3)
- Marius Feder – synthesizer (track 1)
- Gregory Fletcher – background vocals (tracks 1–2)
- Drew Forde – viola
- Roland Garcia – percussion (track 3)
- Peter Gonzales – drums (track 2), programming (track 2)
- Sergiu "Rappy" Gherman – programming (tracks 1–2)
- Jeff "Gitty" Gitelman – bass (track 3), electric guitar (track 3), synthesizer (track 3)
- Peter Gonzales – drums (track 2), programming (track 2)
- Nayanna Holley – background vocals (tracks 1–2)
- Stuart Johnson – drums (tracks 1–2), synthesizer (track 2)
- Charles Jones – background vocals (tracks 1–2)
- Daniel Krieger – guitar (tracks 1–2), bass (tracks 1–2)
- Andrew Kwon – violin (track 2)
- Haesol Lee – violin (track 2)
- Daniel Lim – cello (track 2)
- Ginny Luke – violin (track 3)
- Lisa McCormick – French horn (track 3)
- Kadeem Nichols – background vocals (tracks 1–2)
- Stanley Randolph – drums (track 3)
- Aretha Scruggs – background vocals (tracks 1–2)
- Toni Scruggs – background vocals (tracks 1–2)
- Jordan Seigel – string arrangement (tracks 1–2)
- Fletcher Sheridan – background vocals (tracks 1–2)
- David Simmonds – background vocals (tracks 1–2)
- SORA – cello (track 3)
- The Whole Soul Strings – strings (tracks 1–2)
- Danielle Withers – background vocals (tracks 1–2)

=== Technical ===
- Hozier – vocal engineer (track 2)
- Wil Anspach – engineer (track 2)
- Matt Anthony – engineer (tracks 1–2)
- Tom Elmhirst – mixing engineer (track 1)
- Greg Calbi – mastering engineer (all tracks)
- Sean Cook – vocal engineer (tracks 1–2)
- Steve Fallone – mastering engineer (track 2)
- Jeff "Gitty" Gitelman – engineer (track 3)
- Peter Gonzales – recording engineer (track 1), mixing engineer (track 2)
- Adam Hong – mixing engineer (track 1)
- Peter Katis – mixing engineer (track 3)
- Daniel Krieger – vocal engineer (tracks 1–2)
- Logan Taylor – assistant recording engineer (track 1), engineer (track 2)
- Jordan Siegel – recording engineer (track 2)

== Chart performance ==
While the EP as a whole did not chart in any territory, all three songs charted individually.

=== "Eat Your Young" ===
==== Weekly charts ====
Weekly chart performance for "Eat Your Young"
Chart (2023)	Peak position
Austria (Ö3 Austria Top 40)	45
Canada Hot 100 (Billboard)	40
Canada Rock (Billboard)	6
German Download Singles (Official German Charts)	7
Global 200 (Billboard)	73
Ireland (IRMA)	7
Latvia (LAIPA)	6
Netherlands (Single Top 100)	94
New Zealand Top 40 Singles (RMNZ)	38
Switzerland (Schweizer Hitparade)	73
UK Singles (OCC)	22
US Billboard Hot 100	67
US Adult Pop Airplay (Billboard)	32
US Hot Rock & Alternative Songs (Billboard)	6
US Rock & Alternative Airplay (Billboard)	7

==== Year-end charts ====
Year-end chart performance for "Eat Your Young"
Chart (2023)	Position
US Hot Rock & Alternative Songs (Billboard)	41
US Rock Airplay (Billboard)	38

==== Certifications ====
Certifications for "Eat Your Young"
Region	Certification	Certified units/sales
Poland (ZPAV)	Gold	25,000^{‡}
United States (RIAA)	Platinum	1,000,000^{‡}
^{‡} Sales+streaming figures based on certification alone.

=== "All Things End" ===
Chart performance for "All Things End"
Chart (2023)	Peak position
Canadian Digital Song Sales (Billboard)	36
Ireland (IRMA)	30
New Zealand Hot Singles (RMNZ)	13
US Digital Song Sales (Billboard)	35
US Hot Rock & Alternative Songs (Billboard)	19

=== "Through Me (The Flood)" ===
Chart performance for "Through Me (The Flood)"
Chart (2023)	Peak position
Canadian Digital Song Sales (Billboard)	33
Ireland (IRMA)	40
New Zealand Hot Singles (RMNZ)	18
US Digital Song Sales (Billboard)	36
US Hot Rock & Alternative Songs (Billboard)	25
