= I Used to Know Her =

Compilation album by H.E.R.
- Released: August 30, 2019
- Recorded: 2018–2019
- Genre: R&B
- Label: RCA
- Producers: Cardiak; Dernst "D'Mile" Emile II; Flippa; Gitty; David "Swagg R'celious" Harris; T-Minus; Rodney Jerkins; Craig Balmoris; Jeffrey Rashad; Bēkon; Rappy

H.E.R. chronology
I Used to Know Her: Part 2 (2018)	I Used to Know Her (2019)	Back of My Mind (2021)

Singles from I Used to Know Her
- 1. "Could've Been" Released: September 25, 2018; 2. "Hard Place" Released: April 4, 2019

I Used to Know Her is the second compilation album by American R&B singer H.E.R., released on August 30, 2019 through RCA Records. The album comprises songs from the singer's EPs I Used to Know Her: The Prelude (2018) and I Used to Know Her: Part 2 (2018), and includes five additional songs, as well as extended editions of the songs "Going", "Be on My Way", and "Lord Is Coming".

The compilation received an Album of the Year nomination at the 62nd Grammy Awards, marking H.E.R.'s second consecutive nomination in that category. The Bryson Tiller-featured single "Could've Been" received nominations for Best R&B Song and Best R&B Performance, and "Hard Place" received nominations for Song of the Year and Record of the Year.

== Singles and promotion ==
On April 4, 2019, she released the music video for "Hard Place". She also performed the song live on The Late Show with Stephen Colbert, and the 2019 Grammy Awards. On June 25, the first promotional single "Racks" was released featuring YBN Cordae. The next promotional single was released on July 26, titled "21".

== Accolades ==
Year	Award	Category	Result	R
2019	Soul Train Music Awards	Album/Mixtape of the Year	Nominated	
2020	BET Awards	Album of the Year	Nominated	
2020	Grammy Awards	Album of the Year	Nominated	
2020	NAACP Image Awards	Outstanding Album	Nominated	

== Track listing ==
No.	Title	Writer(s)	Producer(s)	Length
1.	"Lost Souls" (featuring DJ Scratch)	Gabriella Wilson; Tiara Thomas; D. Arcelious Harris; Frederick Hibbert; Jeffrey Gitelman; Keithen Foster; Lauryn Hill	Swagg R'Celious; Gitty; Bassman Foster	2:33
2.	"Fate"	Wilson; Samuel Ashworth; Harris; Ruby Amanfu	Craig Balmoris; Bēkon; The Donuts	3:13
3.	"Carried Away"	Wilson; Dernst Emile II; Foster; Ashworth	T-Minus (additional production); Swagg R'Celious	3:41
4.	"Going (Full)"	Wilson; Harris; Hue "SoundzFire" Strother	D'Mile	2:53
5.	"Be on My Way (Full)"	Harris; Emile II; Wilson; Ashworth	Swagg R'Celious; D'Mile	2:37
6.	"Can't Help Me"	Wilson; Ronald Colson; Gitelman; Ashworth	Gitty; Flippa	2:53
7.	"Something Keeps Pulling Me Back"		D'Mile	3:05
8.	"Feel a Way"	Elijah Dias; Wilson; Strother; Gitelman; Ronald "Flippa" Colson	Gitty; Flippa	3:27
9.	"21"	Wilson; Walter Jones; Gitelman; King Michael Coy	H.E.R.; King Karnov; Jones	3:15
10.	"Racks" (featuring Cordae)	Wilson; Cordae Dunston; Colson; Gitelman; Bozeman	Flippa; Gitty; Jaron Bozeman	3:41
11.	"I'm Not OK"	Wilson; Ashworth	Swagg R'Celious; D'Mile	3:26
12.	"Against Me"	Carl McCormick; Wilson; Strother; Jeffrey Rashad Williams; Nima Jahanbin; Paimon Jahanbin	Cardiak; Wallis Lane; Williams	4:30
13.	"Could've Been" (featuring Bryson Tiller)	Harris; Emile; Wilson; Strother	D'Mile	4:08
14.	"Good to Me"		H.E.R.; Swagg R'Celious	7:12
15.	"Take You There"	Wilson; Ali P; Modesty Lycan; Edwin Elijah Diaz	Flippa; Gitty	4:02
16.	"As I Am"	Dias; Wilson; Strother; Gitelman; Colson	Flippa; Gitty	4:00
17.	"Hard Place (Single Version)"	Wilson; Harris; Amanfu	Darkchild	3:32
18.	"Uninvited (Live)"			3:43
19.	"Lord Is Coming" (featuring Cordae)	Wilson; Alanna Boudreau	Craig Balmoris; Bēkon; The Donuts	6:09

== Personnel ==
Credits adapted from Tidal.

Musicians

- David "Swagg R'celious" Harris – programming (2), drums (14), keyboards (14)
- Dernst "D'Mile" Emile II – bass, guitar (3)
- Keith "Bassman" Foster – bass (3, 14)
- Sam Ashworth – guitar (3, 6)
- H.E.R. – acoustic guitar (14)
- Jack Rochon – electric guitar (14)
- Alonzo "Zo" Harris – organ (14), piano (18), strings (18, 19)
- Karina Pasian – background vocals (17)
- Phillip Lewis – keyboards (17)
- Rodney "Darkchild" Jerkins – keyboards (17)
- Ajanee Hambrick – background vocals (18)
- Malik Spence – background vocals (18)
- Melody Giron – cello (18)
- Carrington Brown – drums (18)
- Ervin Dede – viola (18)
- Marissa Licata – violin (18)
- Sarah Koenig-Plonskier – violin (18)
- Scott Mulvahill – bass (19)

Technical

- Dave Kutch – mastering engineer (1–16, 18, 19)
- Colin Leonard – mastering engineer (17)
- Miki Tsutsumi – mixing engineer (1, 4, 6, 7, 9–12, 14, 15, 19), recording engineer (1, 3–5, 7, 8, 10–19)
- Jaycen Joshua – mixing engineer (2, 17, 19)
- Phil Tan – mixing engineer (3, 5, 8, 13, 16)
- Dernst "D'Mile" Emile II – recording engineer (1, 4, 5, 7, 11)
- Omar Loya – recording engineer (9, 12)
- Victor Pereyra – recording engineer (15)
- Derek Keota – recording engineer (17)
- Joseph Hurtado – recording engineer (17)
- Carl Barc – recording engineer (18)
- Ciel Eckard-Lee – recording engineer (19)
- Bill Zimmerman – engineer (3)
- Ayana Depas – assistant engineer (1, 4, 6, 9–12, 14, 15, 17)
- Jaron Bozeman – assistant engineer (1, 4, 5, 7, 11, 13)
- Jacob Richards – assistant engineer (2, 17)
- Michael Seaberg – assistant engineer (2, 17)
- Rashawn Mclean – assistant engineer (2, 17)
- Phillip Martelly – assistant engineer (15)
- Ben Fusel – assistant engineer (17)
- Sean Klein – assistant engineer (18)
- DJ Riggins – assistant engineer (19)

== Charts ==
Chart (2019)	Peak position
US Billboard 200	86

== Certifications ==
Region	Certification	Certified units/sales
New Zealand (RMNZ)	Gold	7,500^{‡}
United States (RIAA)	Gold	500,000^{‡}
^{‡} Sales+streaming figures based on certification alone.
