= Unreal Unearth =

Studio album by Hozier
- Released: 18 August 2023
- Recorded: March 2021 – February 2023
- Length: 62:22
- Labels: Rubyworks; Island; Columbia
- Producers: Andrew Hozier-Byrne; Jennifer Decilveo; Bekon; Chakra; Craig Balmoris; Jeff "Gitty" Gitelman; Pete G; Sergiu Gherman; Tyler Mehlenbacher

Hozier chronology
Eat Your Young (2023)	Unreal Unearth (2023)	Unheard (2024)

Singles from Unreal Unearth
- 1. "All Things End" Released: 27 April 2023; 2. "Francesca" Released: 19 May 2023; 3. "Unknown / Nth" Released: 23 June 2023; 4. "De Selby (Part 2)" Released: 21 July 2023

Unreal Unearth is the third studio album by Irish musician Hozier, released on 18 August 2023. A loose concept album inspired by and drawing on themes from Dante's Inferno, it contains the singles "Eat Your Young" and "Francesca", along with the song "All Things End". Hozier toured Ireland, the UK, North America, Australia, and New Zealand in support of the record from June 2023 to October 2025. The album received generally positive reviews from critics and debuted at number one on the Irish and UK charts.

== Background ==
Hozier wrote the album during the COVID-19 pandemic and stated it was his way of "mak[ing] sense of the experience of the last two years". It was inspired by Dante's Inferno, which he began reading at the time; he framed the album around Dante's concept of the nine circles of Hell. He called the album "quite eclectic" and stated that there is "something of a retrospective in what the sounds lean into". He also said that the three tracks on the preceding Eat Your Young EP were "not representative of the entire album". Hozier also draws from characters and logic seen in Flann O'Brien's novel The Third Policeman. Unreal Unearth as a whole signifies a journey through Dante's nine circles of Hell and coming out at the other side, with each song referring to a specific "universal theme" or feeling.

The album features Hozier writing and singing lyrics in the Irish language for the first time. In an interview with The Irish Times, he said that "there's so much that cannot be expressed outside of that language, that language can express that we're unaware of". The track "Butchered Tongue" refers to attempts by the British administration to destroy the Irish language through colonialism.

On 15 March 2024, in honor of one year since the Eat Your Young EP, Hozier released the Unheard EP. It includes four songs originally recorded for Unreal Unearth: "Too Sweet", "Wildflower and Barley" featuring Allison Russell, "Empire Now", and "Fare Well". The tracks represent the stages of gluttony, limbo, violence, and ascent, respectively, from Dante's Inferno, but did not make the final cut for the album.

On 16 August 2024, in honor of one year since the album's release, Hozier released the Unaired EP. It includes three more songs originally recorded for Unreal Unearth: "Nobody's Soldier", "July", and "That You Are" featuring Bedouine.

On 6 December 2024, Hozier released Unreal Unearth: Unending, a super deluxe version of the album. It includes the original 16 tracks, the seven tracks from Unheard and Unaired, "Through Me (The Flood)" from Eat Your Young, "Swan Upon Leda", and a brand new song titled "Hymn to Virgil".

== Critical reception ==
Professional ratings
Aggregate scores
Source	Rating
AnyDecentMusic?	7.6/10
Metacritic	76/100
Review scores
Source	Rating
Exclaim!	8/10
The Line of Best Fit	9/10
Mojo	4/5 stars
NME	4/5 stars
Paste	8.2/10
Pitchfork	5.0/10
The Skinny	4/5 stars
Uncut	7/10

Unreal Unearth received a score of 76 out of 100 on review aggregator Metacritic based on 14 critics' reviews, indicating "generally favorable" reception. Caitlin Chatterton of The Line of Best Fit found that "as well as uplifting Irish culture, the album is keen to demonstrate that Hozier is well versed in the classics" and concluded that "from the folk twang of 'First Time' to the torrential clapping on 'Anything But', this is a Hozier album to the hilt: considered, earnest, and moving". Rho Chung of The Skinny remarked that "Hozier's far-reaching vocal range is on full display" on the album, which Chung called "an eclectic and meandering meditation on love at a time in which our continued existence often feels at odds with the planet's".

CT Jones of Rolling Stone stated that "Hozier doesn't just succeed in exploring that dark emotional world; his painful ascent makes the listener immediately want to climb with him. Even harder, he successfully delivers a third album that doesn't shy away from any topic, even when he doesn't have the answers." Maddison Ryan of Exclaim! described the album as "a journey" that "even without prior knowledge of the album's roots in classic literature, it feels part of a greater mythology", ultimately calling it "the kind of music that people can escape into; the soundtrack to feelings not even Heaven can hold".

Aliya Chaudhry of NME remarked that Unreal Unearth "traverses a variety of styles from softer piano ballads like 'Butchered Tongue' to up-tempo folk-pop 'Anything But' and fuzzy-guitar rock stomp 'Francesca'", making the album "a product of going where the song takes you". Uncut complimented tracks as well, writing that "'De Selby Part 2' shows he can stylishly bring funk and R&B influences to bear. But most distinctive are the Afrobeat touches that lace 'Damage Gets Done' and 'Anything But'".

Sam Eeckhout of Paste stated that the album is "packed full of poetic lyricism, heavyhearted remorse, hopeful anticipation and an honest expression of the joys and sorrow of being a human" and has "a sharp balance" that makes it "never top-heavy" nor "ever stagnant". Mojo wrote that "Hozier's audacity can feel outsized and overbearing, but his tandem of earnestness and eccentricity here is more winning than not". Pitchfork's Peyton Thomas described the album as a "mishmash of mythology and past-date pop that leaves [Hozier] sounding like an interloper".

=== Year-end lists ===
Select year-end rankings of Unreal Unearth
Publication	Accolade	Rank	Ref.
The A.V. Club	The 27 Best Albums of 2023	22	
American Songwriter	American Songwriter's Top 17 Albums of 2023	—N/a	
Billboard	The 50 Best Albums of 2023: Staff List	27	
The Daily Telegraph	The 10 Best Albums of 2023	9	
HuffPost	The Best Albums of 2023	—N/a	
Esquire	The 20 Best Albums of 2023	3	

== Unreal Unearth Tour ==
Unreal Unearth Tour stage during "Work Song"

Hozier announced the Unreal Unearth tour on 17 March 2023, alongside the release of the Eat Your Young EP. The initial leg of the tour spanned across North America and Europe from June through December 2023. On 9 November 2023, Hozier announced a second leg of the United States tour, adding 37 new dates between April and September 2024; 14 new shows were later added on 29 January 2024 followed by an additional 6 dates announced on 29 February 2024. The Teskey Brothers, Victoria Canal, Madison Cunningham, Brittany Howard, Lord Huron, and The Last Dinner Party joined Hozier as openers during the initial leg of the tour. Hozier also brought his father, John Byrne, on stage to perform in the encore during the September 30, 2023 performance at Madison Square Garden in New York City. Allison Russell opened for the second US leg of the tour. An Australian and New Zealand leg of the tour was announced on 11 March 2024, with Joy Oladokun as the opening act. A third leg for the US was announced on 30 January 2025, with Gigi Perez and Amble joining as special guest performers.

The Unreal Unearth Tour setlist included songs from the Unreal Unearth, Wasteland, Baby!, and Hozier albums. The main set openers included songs "De Selby (Part 1)" and "De Selby (Part 2)". "Take Me to Church" and "First Light" closed the set. "Work Song" functioned as the show's encore.

Hozier worked with Production Designer Steven Douglass and Tour Director Duchess Iredale to create the Unreal Unearth tour visuals. The show focuses heavily on the use of projections and lighting. The main stage background features animated projections on a piece of metal mesh; the projections follow the album's journey underground and into Hell.

== Track listing ==
Unreal Unearth track listing
No.	Title	Writer(s)	Producer(s)	Length
1.	"De Selby (Part 1)"	Andrew Hozier-Byrne	Jeff "Gitty" Gitelman; Hozier-Byrne; Bekon^{[a]}; Pete G^{[a]}	3:39
2.	"De Selby (Part 2)"	Hozier-Byrne; Gitelman; Daniel Tannenbaum; Sergiu Gherman; Daniel Krieger; Peter Gonzales	Bekon; Chakra; Pete G; Gitelman; Gherman; Hozier-Byrne; Marius Feder^{[a]}	3:47
3.	"First Time"	Hozier-Byrne; Alex Ryan; Gitelman	Gitelman; Hozier-Byrne	3:53
4.	"Francesca"	Hozier-Byrne; Jennifer Decilveo	Decilveo; Hozier-Byrne	4:30
5.	"I, Carrion (Icarian)"	Hozier-Byrne; Decilveo	Decilveo; Hozier-Byrne	3:16
6.	"Eat Your Young"	Hozier-Byrne; Tannenbaum; Gonzales; Krieger; Gherman; Stuart Johnson; Tyler Mehlenbacher; Craig Balmoris; Feder	Bekon; Pete G; Chakra; Gherman; Hozier-Byrne	4:02
7.	"Damage Gets Done" (with Brandi Carlile)	Hozier-Byrne; Tannenbaum; Gonzales; Krieger; Gherman; Johnson; Mehlenbacher	Bekon; Pete G; Chakra; Gherman; Feder^{[a]}; Sariah Mae^{[a]}	4:28
8.	"Who We Are"	Hozier-Byrne; Tannenbaum; Krieger; Gonzales; Gherman	Bekon; Pete G; Chakra; Gherman	4:05
9.	"Son of Nyx"	Ryan; Hozier-Byrne; Tannenbaum	Bekon; Pete G	3:19
10.	"All Things End"	Hozier-Byrne; Tannenbaum; Krieger; Gonzales; Gherman; Johnson	Bekon; Pete G; Chakra; Gherman; Feder^{[a]}	3:33
11.	"To Someone from a Warm Climate (Uiscefhuaraithe)"	Hozier-Byrne; Gitelman	Gitelman; Hozier-Byrne	4:00
12.	"Butchered Tongue"	Hozier-Byrne	Decilveo; Hozier-Byrne	2:29
13.	"Anything But"	Hozier-Byrne; Tannenbaum; Krieger; Gonzales; Gherman; Johnson; Feder	Bekon; Pete G; Chakra; Gherman	3:45
14.	"Abstract (Psychopomp)"	Hozier-Byrne; Tannenbaum; Gonzales; Krieger; Gherman; Johnson; Mehlenbacher; Balmoris	Bekon; Pete G; Chakra; Gherman; Balmoris; Mehlenbacher	4:04
15.	"Unknown / Nth"	Hozier-Byrne	Hozier-Byrne	4:40
16.	"First Light"	Hozier-Byrne; Tannenbaum; Gonzales; Krieger; Gherman; Johnson; Mehlenbacher; Balmoris	Bekon; Pete G; Chakra; Gherman; Balmoris; Mehlenbacher; Hozier-Byrne	4:52
Total length:				62:22

Unreal Unearth: Unending additional track listing
No.	Title	Writer(s)	Producer(s)	Length
1.	"Nobody's Soldier"	Hozier-Byrne; Tannenbaum; Chakra; Johnson; Gherman; Pete G	Tannenbaum; Pete G; Chakra; Gherman	3:57
2.	"July"	Hozier-Byrne	Jeff Gitelman	3:34
3.	"That You Are" (with Bedouine)	Hozier-Byrne; Bedouine	Gus Seyffert	4:16
4.	"Swan Upon Leda"	Hozier-Byrne	Decilveo; Hozier-Byrne	3:42
5.	"Hymn to Virgil"	Hozier-Byrne; Bekon; Chakra; Gherman; Gitelman; Gonzales	Hozier-Byrne; Bekon; Gitelman	3:22
6.	"Too Sweet"	Hozier-Byrne; Krieger; Tannenbaum; Gonzales; Gherman; Johnson; Mehlenbacher	Hozier-Byrne; Bekon; Chakra; Pete G; Gherman	4:11
7.	"Wildflower and Barley" (with Allison Russell)	Hozier-Byrne; Russell; Gitelman	Hozier-Byrne; Gitelman	3:42
8.	"Empire Now"	Hozier-Byrne; Balmoris; Krieger; Tannenbaum; Marius Felder; Gonzales; Gherman; Johnson; Mehlenbacher	Bekon; Chakra; Balmoris; Pete G; Gherman; Mehlenbacher	2:58
9.	"Fare Well"	Hozier-Byrne	Hozier-Byrne; Decilveo	3:08
10.	"Through Me (The Flood)"	Hozier-Byrne	Gitelman	3:47
Total length:				95:12

Note

- ^{^[a]} signifies an additional producer

== Personnel ==
Musicians

- Andrew Hozier-Byrne – vocals (all tracks), Mellotron (track 3), guitar (4, 5), all instruments (15)
- Brandi Carlile – vocals (7)
- Jeff Gitelman – electric guitar, synthesizer, bass guitar, piano (1–3, 11)
- Alex Ryan – bass guitar (tracks 1, 2, 4, 5), Wurlitzer, backing vocals (3), organ (4), piano (5, 12)
- Stanley Randolph – drums (1–3)
- Ginny Luke – violin (1–3, 11)
- Sora – cello (1–3, 11)
- Lisa McCormick – French horn (1, 2)
- Dominique Sanders – upright bass (3, 11)
- Jennifer Decilveo – piano, synthesizer (4, 5, 12), drum programming (4)
- Sam KS – drums (4, 5, 12)
- David Levita – guitar (4, 5, 12)
- Peter Gonzales – Mellotron, tape effects (1), synthesizer (2, 7, 14), arrangements (2, 6), backing vocals (7), drums (8, 10, 16), percussion (8, 10), sampling (9), programming (8, 10), drum programming (7, 13, 14), guitar (16)
- Huang Ming Xiang 黄民翔 – pipa (1)
- Daniel Tannenbaum – strings (2, 6–10, 13, 14, 16), keyboards (2, 7), synthesizer (2, 6–8, 10, 13, 14, 16), arrangements (2, 8), background vocals (6, 13), organ (6), piano (8, 10, 14, 16), clapping (13), additional vocals (16)
- Daniel Krieger – bass, guitar (2, 6–8, 10, 13, 14, 16)
- Stuart Johnson – percussion (2), drums (6–8, 10, 14, 16), programming (8, 14), synthesizer (10)
- Sergiu Gherman – sampling, programming (2, 7, 8, 10, 14, 16), Rhodes (8), clapping (13)
- Craig Balmoris – drum sampling (6), drum programming (16)
- Marius Feder – synthesizer (6), clapping (13)
- Fletcher Sheridan, Danielle Withers, Aretha Scruggs, Nayanna Holley, Toni Scruggs, Charles Jones, Kadeem Nichols, David Simmonds, Gregory Fletcher – choir (6, 10)
- Budapest Scoring Orchestra (Conductor: Péter Illényi) (1, 9, 16)
- The Whole Soul Strings (2, 6, 10)
  - Haesol Lee – violin
  - Andrew Kwon – violin
  - Drew Alexander Forde – viola
  - Daniel Lim – cello
- Jordan Seigel – orchestrations (1, 2, 6, 9, 10, 16)

Technical

- Greg Calbi – mastering
- Steve Fallone – mastering (1–3, 5–16)
- David Levita – mastering (4)
- Zach Szydlo – Atmos mastering
- Pete G – mixing (1, 9, 10, 13)
- Mark "Spike" Stent – mixing (2, 7, 16)
- Kieran Beardmore – mix engineering (2, 7, 16)
- Liam O'Dowd – mix engineering (2, 7, 16)
- Matt Wolach – mix engineering (2, 7, 16)
- Shawn Everett – mixing (3)
- Andrew Scheps – mixing (4, 5, 11, 12, 15)
- Tom Elmhirst – mixing, programming (6, 8, 14)
- Adam Hong – mix engineering (6, 8, 14)
- Jeff Gitelman – engineering (1–3, 11)
- RJ Cardenas – engineering (1–3, 11)
- Viktor Szabó – engineering (1), engineering (orchestra) (1, 9, 16)
- Jennifer Decilveo – engineering (4, 5, 12)
- Nick Squillante – engineering (4, 5, 12)
- Sean Cook – engineering (4, 5–8, 10, 12–16)
- Daniel Krieger – engineering (6–8, 10, 13, 14, 16)
- Logan Taylor – engineering (6, 8, 10, 13, 14, 16)
- Matt Anthony – engineering (6, 10, 14, 16)
- Greg Truitt – engineering (8, 10, 13)
- Wil Anspach – engineering (10)

== Charts ==
=== Weekly charts ===
Weekly chart performance for Unreal Unearth
Chart (2023–2025)	Peak position
Australian Albums (ARIA)	13
Austrian Albums (Ö3 Austria)	7
Belgian Albums (Ultratop Flanders)	7
Belgian Albums (Ultratop Wallonia)	17
Canadian Albums (Billboard)	7
Dutch Albums (Album Top 100)	2
Finnish Albums (Suomen virallinen lista)	31
French Albums (SNEP)	172
German Albums (Offizielle Top 100)	4
Greek Albums (IFPI)	55
Icelandic Albums (Tónlistinn)	14
Irish Albums (Official Charts)	1
Lithuanian Albums (AGATA)	49
New Zealand Albums (RMNZ)	2
Norwegian Albums (VG-lista)	26
Polish Albums (ZPAV)	12
Scottish Albums (Official Charts)	2
Spanish Albums (Promusicae)	49
Swedish Albums (Sverigetopplistan)	45
Swiss Albums (Schweizer Hitparade)	5
UK Albums (Official Charts)	1
US Billboard 200	3
US Americana/Folk Albums (Billboard)	1
US Top Alternative Albums (Billboard)	1
US Top Rock Albums (Billboard)	1

Weekly chart performance for Unreal Unearth: Unheard
Chart (2024)	Peak position
Croatian International Albums (HDU)	37
Hungarian Albums (MAHASZ)	18

Weekly chart performance for Unreal Unearth: Unending
Chart (2024)	Peak position
Croatian International Albums (HDU)	25

=== Year-end charts ===
Year-end chart performance for Unreal Unearth
Chart (2023)	Position
UK Cassette Albums (OCC)	7

2024 year-end chart performance for Unreal Unearth
Chart (2024)	Position
Hungarian Albums (MAHASZ)	69
New Zealand Albums (RMNZ)	50

== Certifications ==
Certifications for Unreal Unearth
Region	Certification	Certified units/sales
Denmark (IFPI Danmark)	Gold	10,000^{‡}
New Zealand (RMNZ) for Unreal Unearth: Unheard	Platinum	15,000^{‡}
Poland (ZPAV)	Platinum	20,000^{‡}
United Kingdom (BPI)	Gold	100,000^{‡}
United States (RIAA)	Platinum	1,000,000^{‡}
^{‡} Sales+streaming figures based on certification alone.
