= Too Sweet =

Single by Hozier

from the EP Unheard
- Released: 22 March 2024
- Genre: Retro-soul; pop rock; funk rock
- Length: 4:11 (album version); 3:19 (radio edit)
- Label: Rubyworks; Island
- Songwriters: Andrew Hozier-Byrne; Bekon; Peter Gonzales; Sergiu Gherman; Stuart Johnson; Tyler Mehlenbacher; Daniel Krieger
- Producers: Hozier; Bekon; Chakra; Sergiu Gherman; Peter Gonzales

Hozier singles chronology
"Northern Attitude" (2023)	"Too Sweet" (2024)	"Nobody's Soldier" (2024)

Music video
- "Too Sweet" on YouTube

"Too Sweet" is a song by Irish singer-songwriter Hozier. It was released on 22 March 2024, through Rubyworks and Island Records in the UK, and Columbia Records in the US, as the first track from his seventh EP, Unheard, and was released as a single on 29 March 2024. The song has topped charts in 14 countries including Australia, Croatia, Czech Republic, Ecuador, Iceland, Ireland, New Zealand, Norway, Poland, Slovakia, Suriname, the United Kingdom, the United States, and Venezuela. The track ranked as the fifth best-selling single of 2024 in the United Kingdom.

== Background ==
On 14 March 2024, Hozier announced his fifth EP, Unheard, that features four previously unreleased tracks taken from sessions for his third studio album, Unreal Unearth (2023). The singer clarified that the songs "could not make the original release" for various reasons, but still fit the themes of "gluttony, limbo, violence and the outward 'ascent'". He first teased the song the same day on TikTok in a clip that features him drawing a sketch of a skeleton. "Too Sweet" was surprise-released as the opening track to the project on 22 March.

== Composition ==
"Too Sweet" sees Hozier meeting the "rhythm of a true night owl", sipping whiskey and drinking black coffee. Additionally, it shows the facets and multitudes of a relationship, as the singer talks to his significant other. While she prefers to lead a healthy lifestyle, he makes use of the various "pleasures" of life. The singer favours the rawness because his partner is "already too sweet". The song further explores the theme of how differences can evolve during a relationship. Musically, Rolling Stone writer John Lonsdale described the song as "tough, catchy retro-R&B groove."

== Critical reception ==
"Too Sweet" received positive reviews from music critics. Rolling Stone named it among the best songs of 2024. The Guardian also praised the song as among the best of summer 2024: "It's fired by a sly funk beat primed to pack a sweaty dance floor or beach party..."

== Commercial performance ==
"Too Sweet" debuted at number 8 on the UK Singles Chart on 29 March 2024, earning Hozier his first top-ten single in the United Kingdom since "Take Me to Church" in 2014 and second overall. It rose to number 4 on 5 April 2024. On 12 April 2024, it reached number 1 with 61,000 chart units and 6.7 million streams, becoming Hozier's first UK number one single.

In the United States, "Too Sweet" debuted at number five on the Billboard Hot 100 the week of 6 April 2024, marking Hozier's first top 10 debut and second top 10 after "Take Me to Church". Three weeks later, the song reached number one, surpassing the number two peak of "Take Me to Church" and becoming Hozier's first number-one in the United States. With this, Hozier became the first Irish act to top the Billboard Hot 100 since Sinéad O'Connor in 1990 with "Nothing Compares 2 U", and fourth overall along with O'Connor, Gilbert O'Sullivan and U2.

In October 2025, "Too Sweet" broke the record for most weeks on American Top 40 in its 76th week, which was previously held by Rema's "Calm Down", which spent 75 weeks on that chart from November 2022 until April 2024.

== Personnel ==
Taken from Unreal Unearth Unending liner notes.

- Andrew Hozier-Byrne – vocals
- Peter Gonzales – drums, percussion, chimes, Farfisa
- Daniel Tannenbaum – strings, keys, drum programming, backing vocals, Farfisa, Mellotron
- Daniel Krieger – bass, guitar
- Stuart Johnson – percussion, drums

== Charts ==
=== Weekly charts ===
Weekly chart performance for "Too Sweet"
Chart (2024–2026)	Peak position
Argentina Anglo Airplay (Monitor Latino)	7
Australia (ARIA)	1
Austria (Ö3 Austria Top 40)	4
Belarus Airplay (TopHit)	124
Belgium (Ultratop 50 Flanders)	15
Belgium (Ultratop 50 Wallonia)	3
Bolivia Airplay (Monitor Latino)	16
Brazil Hot 100 (Billboard)	41
Brazil Airplay (Top 100 Brasil)	82
Bulgaria Airplay (National Top 40)	28
Canada Hot 100 (Billboard)	2
Canada AC (Billboard)	2
Canada CHR/Top 40 (Billboard)	1
Canada Hot AC (Billboard)	1
Canada Rock (Billboard)	1
Central America Anglo Airplay (Monitor Latino)	10
Colombia Anglo Airplay (Monitor Latino)	2
CIS Airplay (TopHit)	19
Costa Rica Anglo Airplay (Monitor Latino)	2
Croatia Streaming (Billboard)	12
Croatia International Airplay (Top lista)	1
Czech Republic Airplay (ČNS IFPI)	1
Czech Republic Singles Digital (ČNS IFPI)	4
Denmark (Tracklisten)	5
Dominican Republic Anglo Airplay (Monitor Latino)	9
Ecuador Airplay (Monitor Latino)	15
El Salvador Anglo Airplay (Monitor Latino)	8
Estonia Airplay (TopHit)	9
Finland (Suomen virallinen lista)	23
France (SNEP)	38
Germany (GfK)	10
Global 200 (Billboard)	1
Greece International Streaming (IFPI)	4
Guatemala Anglo Airplay (Monitor Latino)	10
Hungary (Editors' Choice Top 40)	13
Hungary (Single Top 40)	14
Iceland (Tónlistinn)	1
India International Streaming (IMI)	13
Ireland (IRMA)	1
Israel (Mako Hitlist)	33
Italy (FIMI)	82
Latin America Anglo Airplay (Monitor Latino)	2
Latvia Airplay (LaIPA)	2
Latvia Streaming (LaIPA)	3
Lebanon (Lebanese Top 20)	9
Lithuania (AGATA)	2
Luxembourg (Billboard)	6
Malaysia (Billboard)	13
Malaysia International Streaming (RIM)	11
Middle East and North Africa (IFPI)	15
Mexico Anglo Airplay (Monitor Latino)	2
Moldova Airplay (TopHit)	14
Netherlands (Dutch Top 40)	17
Netherlands (Single Top 100)	9
New Zealand (Recorded Music NZ)	1
Nigeria (TurnTable Top 100)	52
Norway (VG-lista)	1
Panama Anglo Airplay (Monitor Latino)	8
Paraguay Airplay (Monitor Latino)	10
Peru Anglo Airplay (Monitor Latino)	8
Philippines (Philippines Hot 100)	33
Poland (Polish Airplay Top 100)	1
Poland (Polish Streaming Top 100)	15
Portugal (AFP)	11
Puerto Rico Anglo Airplay (Monitor Latino)	2
Romania Airplay (Media Forest)	2
Romania TV Airplay (Media Forest)	7
Russia Airplay (TopHit)	89
San Marino Airplay (SMRTV Top 50)	40
Serbia Airplay (Radiomonitor)	1
Singapore (RIAS)	5
Slovakia Airplay (ČNS IFPI)	1
Slovakia Singles Digital (ČNS IFPI)	9
Slovenia Airplay (Radiomonitor)	12
South Africa Airplay (TOSAC)	2
South Africa Streaming (TOSAC)	6
Suriname (Nationale Top 40)	1
Sweden (Sverigetopplistan)	5
Switzerland (Schweizer Hitparade)	5
Turkey International Airplay (Radiomonitor Türkiye)	4
Ukraine Airplay (TopHit)	119
United Arab Emirates (IFPI)	7
UK Singles (Official Charts)	1
US Billboard Hot 100	1
US Adult Contemporary (Billboard)	3
US Adult Pop Airplay (Billboard)	1
US Dance Airplay (Billboard)	17
US Hot Rock & Alternative Songs (Billboard)	1
US Pop Airplay (Billboard)	1
Venezuela Anglo Airplay (Monitor Latino)	1

=== Monthly charts ===
Monthly chart performance for "Too Sweet"
Chart (2024–2025)	Position
CIS Airplay (TopHit)	20
Czech Republic (Rádio Top 100)	1
Czech Republic (Singles Digitál Top 100)	6
Estonia Airplay (TopHit)	11
Lithuania Airplay (TopHit)	12
Moldova Airplay (TopHit)	16
Romania Airplay (TopHit)	12
Russia Airplay (TopHit)	99
Slovakia (Rádio Top 100)	5
Slovakia (Singles Digitál Top 100)	10

=== Year-end charts ===
2024 year-end chart performance for "Too Sweet"
Chart (2024)	Position
Australia (ARIA)	8
Austria (Ö3 Austria Top 40)	7
Belgium (Ultratop 50 Flanders)	38
Belgium (Ultratop 50 Wallonia)	12
Canada (Canadian Hot 100)	8
CIS Airplay (TopHit)	38
Denmark (Tracklisten)	32
Estonia Airplay (TopHit)	20
France (SNEP)	77
Germany (GfK)	24
Global 200 (Billboard)	8
Global Singles (IFPI)	6
Hungary (Single Top 40)	76
Iceland (Tónlistinn)	4
Lithuania Airplay (TopHit)	22
Netherlands (Dutch Top 40)	99
Netherlands (Single Top 100)	33
New Zealand (Recorded Music NZ)	4
Philippines (Philippines Hot 100)	77
Poland (Polish Airplay Top 100)	16
Poland (Polish Streaming Top 100)	35
Portugal (AFP)	20
Romania Airplay (TopHit)	23
Sweden (Sverigetopplistan)	20
Switzerland (Schweizer Hitparade)	13
UK Singles (OCC)	5
US Billboard Hot 100	10
US Adult Contemporary (Billboard)	12
US Adult Top 40 (Billboard)	4
US Hot Rock & Alternative Songs (Billboard)	2
US Mainstream Top 40 (Billboard)	7
US Rock Airplay (Billboard)	4

2025 year-end chart performance for "Too Sweet"
Chart (2025)	Position
Australia (ARIA)	30
Belgium (Ultratop 50 Flanders)	153
Belgium (Ultratop 50 Wallonia)	121
Canada (Canadian Hot 100)	15
Canada AC (Billboard)	4
Canada CHR/Top 40 (Billboard)	85
Canada Hot AC (Billboard)	14
Canada Modern Rock (Billboard)	64
CIS Airplay (TopHit)	104
Estonia Airplay (TopHit)	42
Global 200 (Billboard)	24
Lithuania Airplay (TopHit)	184
Moldova Airplay (TopHit)	81
New Zealand (Recorded Music NZ)	30
Poland (Polish Airplay Top 100)	86
Romania Airplay (TopHit)	102
Switzerland (Schweizer Hitparade)	93
UK Singles (OCC)	34
US Billboard Hot 100	34
US Adult Contemporary (Billboard)	5
US Adult Pop Airplay (Billboard)	12
US Hot Rock & Alternative Songs (Billboard)	2
US Pop Airplay (Billboard)	11
US Rock & Alternative Airplay (Billboard)	3

== Certifications ==
Certifications for "Too Sweet"
Region	Certification	Certified units/sales
Australia (ARIA)	8× Platinum	560,000^{‡}
Austria (IFPI Austria)	Platinum	30,000^{‡}
Belgium (BRMA)	Platinum	40,000^{‡}
Brazil (Pro-Música Brasil)	4× Diamond	640,000^{‡}
Denmark (IFPI Danmark)	Platinum	90,000^{‡}
France (SNEP)	Diamond	333,333^{‡}
Germany (BVMI)	Gold	300,000^{‡}
Italy (FIMI)	Gold	50,000^{‡}
Netherlands (NVPI)	Gold	46,500^{‡}
New Zealand (RMNZ)	7× Platinum	210,000^{‡}
Poland (ZPAV)	3× Platinum	150,000^{‡}
Portugal (AFP)	4× Platinum	40,000^{‡}
Spain (Promusicae)	Platinum	60,000^{‡}
Switzerland (IFPI Switzerland)	Platinum	30,000^{‡}
United Kingdom (BPI)	4× Platinum	2,400,000^{‡}
United States (RIAA)	6× Platinum	6,000,000^{‡}
Streaming
Central America (CFC)	Platinum	7,000,000^{†}
Greece (IFPI Greece)	3× Platinum	6,000,000^{†}
Sweden (GLF)	Platinum	12,000,000^{†}
^{‡} Sales+streaming figures based on certification alone.^{†} Streaming-only figures based on certification alone.

== Inclusion in media ==
"Too Sweet" was used in High Potential season 1, episode 8 titled "Obsessed" in a scene where Morgan and Adam are reviewing evidence for a murder in Adam's apartment. It was also featured in the first episode of the fifth and final season of Netflix show You during the opening of the episode. It was also used by the first formed musical group in the Netflix musical talent show, Building the Band. The song was also featured in the video game, Fortnite Festival.

== Release history ==
Release dates and format(s) for "Too Sweet"
Region	Date	Format(s)	Label	Ref.
Italy	29 March 2024	Radio airplay	Universal	
United States	8 April 2024	Hot adult contemporary radio; Adult contemporary radio	Columbia	
United States	9 April 2024	Contemporary hit radio	Columbia	
