= Could've Been (H.E.R. song) =

2018 single by H.E.R.

Single by H.E.R. featuring Bryson Tiller

from the album I Used to Know Her and I Used to Know Her: The Prelude
- Released: September 25, 2018
- Genre: R&B
- Length: 4:08
- Songwriters: David "Swagg R'celious" Harris; Dernst Emile II; Gabriella Wilson; Hue "SoundzFire" Strother
- Producer: D'Mile

H.E.R. singles chronology
"This Way" (2018)	"Could've Been" (2018)	"Hard Place" (2019)

"Could've Been" is a song by American singer H.E.R. featuring Bryson Tiller. It impacted urban adult contemporary radio on September 25, 2018 as the first and only single from her EP I Used to Know Her: The Prelude. It was later included on the singer's second compilation album I Used to Know Her published in 2019.

The song was written by the singer herself with David "Swagg R'celious" Harris, Hue "SoundzFire" Strother and D'Mile, who also produced it.

== Music video ==
The music video for "Could've Been", directed by Lacey Duke, was published in November 2018.

== Accolades ==
"Could've Been" was nominated for the BET Award for Best Collaboration at the BET Awards 2019 but lost to "Sicko Mode" by Travis Scott featuring Drake. It was also nominated for the MTV Video Music Award for Best R&B Video at the 2019 MTV Video Music Awards but lost to "Waves" by Normani featuring 6lack.

"Could've Been" received additional nominations at the 62nd Grammy Awards including Best R&B Song and Best R&B Performance.

== Controversy ==
Wilson and her co-writers paid an undisclosed amount in a March 2023 settlement, concerning their unauthorized sampling of the award-winning Take 6 song "Come Unto Me" in the making of "Could've Been".

== Charts ==
Chart (2018)	Peak position
New Zealand Hot Singles (RMNZ)	31
US Billboard Hot 100	76
US Hot R&B/Hip-Hop Songs (Billboard)	39
US Adult R&B Songs (Billboard)	2

== Certifications ==
Region	Certification	Certified units/sales
Brazil (Pro-Música Brasil)	2× Platinum	80,000^{‡}
Canada (Music Canada)	2× Platinum	160,000^{‡}
New Zealand (RMNZ)	2× Platinum	60,000^{‡}
United Kingdom (BPI)	Gold	400,000^{‡}
United States (RIAA)	2× Platinum	2,000,000^{‡}
^{‡} Sales+streaming figures based on certification alone.
