= Hard Place =

Single by H.E.R.

from the album I Used to Know Her and I Used to Know Her: Part 2
- Released: April 4, 2019
- Genre: R&B
- Length: 3:32 (single version); 4:32 (EP version)
- Label: RCA
- Songwriters: Gabriella Wilson; Sam Ashworth; David “Swagg R’Celious” Harris; Ruby Amanfu
- Producer: Rodney Jerkins

H.E.R. singles chronology
"Could've Been" (2018)	"Hard Place" (2019)	"Slide" (2019)

Music video
- "Hard Place" on YouTube

"Hard Place" is a song by American singer H.E.R. released on April 4, 2019 as the first single from her fifth EP I Used to Know Her: Part 2 and the second single from her second compilation album I Used to Know Her. It was written by H.E.R., Sam Ashworth, David “Swagg R’Celious” Harris, and Ruby Amanfu and produced by Rodney Jerkins.

== Music video ==
The music video for "Hard Place" was released on April 26, 2019. It features H.E.R. and a love interest who make music together until a promoter wants to recruit H.E.R. without her partner. The rest of the music video shows their relationship and the difficulties that they face as the singer's career rises.

== Accolades ==
Year	Ceremony	Category	Result	Ref.
2019	BET Awards	BET Her Award	Won	
2019	Soul Train Music Awards	The Ashford and Simpson Songwriter of the Year Award	Nominated	
2020	Grammy Awards	Record of the Year	Nominated	
2020	Grammy Awards	Song of the Year	Nominated	
2020	NAACP Image Awards	Outstanding Song - Contemporary	Nominated	
2020	NAACP Image Awards	Outstanding Music Video	Nominated	

== Live performances ==
H.E.R. first performed "Hard Place" on NPR's Tiny Desk, in an episode released on YouTube on December 13, 2018. She also performed it at the 61st Annual Grammy Awards. She performed it again the following month on The Late Show with Stephen Colbert. She also performed it on Nickelodeon sketch comedy series All That on September 28, 2019.

== Charts ==
Chart (2019)	Peak position
Canada Hot Digital Songs (Billboard)	17
Mexico Ingles Airplay (Billboard)	12
New Zealand Hot Singles (RMNZ)	29
US Bubbling Under R&B/Hip-Hop Song (Billboard)	10
US Digital Songs (Billboard)	16
US Hot R&B Songs (Billboard)	15
US Mainstream Top 40 (Billboard)	39
US R&B Digital Songs (Billboard)	2
US R&B/Hip-Hop Digital Songs (Billboard)	5
US Rhythmic (Billboard)	34

== Certifications ==
Region	Certification	Certified units/sales
Brazil (Pro-Música Brasil)	Gold	20,000^{‡}
Canada (Music Canada)	Gold	40,000^{‡}
New Zealand (RMNZ)	Gold	15,000^{‡}
United States (RIAA)	Gold	500,000^{‡}
^{‡} Sales+streaming figures based on certification alone.
