= The Stepkids =

- Origin: Bridgeport, Connecticut, United States
- Genres: Psychedelic soul; funk; jazz
- Years active: 2009–2015
- Label: Stones Throw
- Members: Tim Walsh; Jeff Gitelman; Dan Edinberg; David Pond
- Website: www.stonesthrow.com/thestepkids/

The Stepkids were an American psychedelic soul band composed of Tim Walsh, Jeff Gitelman, and Dan Edinberg. Their early live performances were characterized by kaleidoscopic projections by experimental video artists David Pond and Jesse Mann, consuming the stage with light for a multi-sensory experience while the band plays.

The Stepkids at the San Diego House of Blues 10.5.12 opening for Kimbra

== Music ==
The Stepkids' music is a fusion of jazz, 1960s folk, neo and classic soul, classic funk, psychedelia and 20th century classical.

In October 2010, the band was signed to Stones Throw Records.

In Fall 2011, the band went on tour with The Horrors.

On September 27, 2011, the band released their debut album, The Stepkids. Mojo placed the album at number 25 on its list of "Top 50 albums of 2011". SPIN also placed the album at number 19 on the list "20 Best R&B albums of 2011”.

On October 4, 2011, the band released a music video for "Legend in My Own Mind", starring Wyatt Cenac, and Kurt Braunholer and directed by Tom Scharpling.

In 2011, the band performed at the South by Southwest festival in Austin, Texas, CMJ Music Marathon in New York City, and the Big Chill Festival in Ledbury, England. In 2012, the band performed at the Sydney Festival in Sydney, Australia.

Bassist/Vocalist Dan Edinberg was formerly the bassist of ZOX. Guitarist/Vocalist Jeff Gitelman was formerly the touring guitarist for Alicia Keys.

Having spent most of 2012 touring with Kimbra, Mayer Hawthorne & The County, Grace Potter & the Nocturnals, and Mates of State, along with tours of Australia and Europe, the Connecticut trio was busy finalizing the details for their second album, Troubadour released September 10, 2013. This follow up to their critically praised self-titled 2011 debut included both "Sweet Salvation" and "Bitter Bug", which were released on the "Sweet Salvation EP" in October 2012.

== Discography ==
- The Stepkids (2011)
- Direct to Disc #2 (vinyl-only live album for Stones Throw) (2012)
- In Living Cover (EP; also known as Live Covers) (2013)
- Troubadour (2013)
- Wanderers (EP) (2014)
