= Sam Ashworth (songwriter) =

American songwriter and producer

- Origin: Sacramento, California, U.S.
- Genres: Pop, R&B, Americana
- Occupations: Songwriter; producer; singer
- Years active: 1997–present
- Website: samashworthmusic.com

Samuel Brinsley Ashworth is an American songwriter, producer, and recording artist. Based out of Nashville, Tennessee, he is best known for songs he composed for H.E.R., Leslie Odom Jr., and Sixpence None the Richer.

== Early life ==
Originally from Sacramento, California, Sam Ashworth is the son of musician and producer Charlie Peacock. Growing up, Sam was steeped in the recording process and surrounded by artists, songwriters, and creative professionals setting the stage for his own career as a songwriter, producer, and recording artist. At age nine, Sam moved from Sacramento to Nashville.

While still in high school, Ashworth wrote "I Won't Stay Long", recorded on Sixpence None the Richer's 1997 self-titled album. At age 23, he produced parts of Michael W. Smith's Healing Rain, which received a Grammy nomination and Gold Record.

== Career ==
Since 2005, Ashworth has released three solo projects as a recording artist including Gonna Get It Wrong Before I Get It Right.

His songwriting and production credits span R&B, Americana, folk, pop and EDM, including collaborations with H.E.R., Leslie Odom Jr., his wife Ruby Amanfu, Dierks Bentley, the Civil Wars, the Lone Bellow, Beth Nielsen Chapman, Brett Dennen, and Laidback Luke.

In 2016, he co-wrote and sang the song "Million Times" with Rui.

Ashworth co-wrote nine songs on H.E.R.'s album I Used to Know Her, including "Hard Place". The album and received nominations for Album of the Year and Song of the Year respectively.

Ashworth co-wrote four songs on Leslie Odom Jr.'s 2019 album Mr.. The following year, Odom's song "Cold", co-written by Ashworth, was re-released featuring Sia. Odom and Ashworth's song "Speak Now" from the Amazon Original Film One Night in Miami... is nominated in the 2021 Golden Globe Awards for Best Original Song as well as the 2021 Critics' Choice Award for Best Song.

== Personal life ==
In 2017, Ashworth married longtime collaborator and recording artist, Ruby Amanfu. The two reside in Nashville, Tennessee. They attended the 58th Annual Grammy Awards with their three children.
