= The Plight Before Christmas =

- Bob's Burgers episode
- Episode no.: Season 13; Episode 10
- Directed by: Chris Song
- Story by: Kelvin Yu
- Teleplay by: Loren Bouchard
- Production code: CASA10
- Original air date: December 11, 2022

Guest appearances
- Ashley Nicole Black as Harley; Brooke Dillman as Ginny; Rachel Dratch as Jodi; Tina Fey as Ms. Bisselbender; Melissa Galsky as Molly; John Grady as Guy with Headlamp; David Herman as Taxi Driver and Mr. Frond; John Michael Higgins as Doug; Hrishikesh Hirway as Rishi; Brian Huskey as Ms. Merkin; Saeed Jones as Librarian; David Wain as Courtney; Gabriella Wilson as Aliah

Episode chronology
← Previous "Show Mama from the Grave"	Next → "Cheaty Cheaty Bang Bang"
- Bob's Burgers season 13

"The Plight Before Christmas" is the 10th episode of the thirteenth season of the American animated comedy series Bob's Burgers and the 248th episode overall. It had a teleplay by Loren Bouchard, a story by Kelvin Yu, and was directed by Chris Song. It originally aired in the U.S. on Fox on December 11, 2022. In this episode, Bob and Linda try to attend all three kids' holiday performances at the same time.

== Plot ==
In the restaurant, Gene is practicing for his xylophone concert later that night. Linda is distraught that she is going to miss it, as she is taking Tina to her Thundergirl's holiday play at city hall. In a brief flashback, Bob and Linda flip a coin to see which one of their children they're taking to their respective performances. Louise enters the restaurant and asks which one of her parents is taking her to her poetry contest. Bob and Linda are shocked to learn that Louise's performance is that same night, thinking it was the following day. Louise comes up with an idea that her mother could drop her off at the library while on her way towards Tina's play.

In the car, Tina reassures Louise that she should've submitted an actual poem from the heart that year, as Louise would sneak in the word "poop" in her previous poems years prior. Before Louise gets dropped off at the Library, Tina tells her sister that she recalled Louise saying that she wrote a serious poem that year, in which Louise gets defensive about it. At the school, Bob and Gene notice a lot of worried looks among the other parents. A young woman walks up to them and introduces herself as Ms. Bisselbender, the substitute music teacher. Much to Gene's dismay, his music teacher couldn't make it due to her appendix bursting.

At city hall, Linda helps Thundergirl leader Ginny with dressing up the scouts. Linda compliments Tina's star costume, in which fellow scout Harley states that she wanted to be the star. As Linda and Ginny talk, Tina figures out that Louise submitted her real poem based on her actions in the car, which causes Linda to scream in shock. Linda calls Bob and tells him about Louise's real poem, in which Bob thinks he can make it to the library in time to hear it. Bob uses a taxi to get there quickly, but notices that he's heading down the wrong street, due to the driver being hard of hearing. Bob decides to run the rest of the way there and gets help from a guy wearing a headlamp with climbing over a fence. Bob realizes he ran to the wrong library, so he accepts defeat and hurries back to the school.

Back at Gene's concert, the first song goes horribly wrong, as the song was constructed without proper instructions. Backstage, Gene comes up with a plan that he thinks will save the concert. As Ms. Bisselbender talks to the audience, Gene quickly removes keys from each xylophone. Bob makes it back in time as the second song is about to begin. The class plays a xylophone rendition of Philip Glass' "Mishima / Closing", which plays over the next scene of Louise reading her poem. Louise sees Tina emerge from the crowd of people, as it was revealed that she let Harley become the star in Tina's place. Louise finishes her poem and gets applauded by everyone, including Linda, who had just walked into the crowd.

In the car on the way back home, Tina teases Louise for submitting an actual poem about her family. Gene's class finishes the song and receives a standing ovation by everyone in the audience. Mr. Frond gives Ms. Bisselbender a paycheck for substituting the concert, which he states only counts for a "half-day". The non-xylophone version of "Mishima / Closing" plays as she leaves the school. The song plays for the rest of the episode as it briefly shows Bob reading Louise's genuine poem, Gene showing Ms. Merkin the school concert, and the Belcher children opening up their Christmas presents.

== Reception ==
The episode has received critical acclaim from fans and critics, with some saying it is the best episode of the series. Coleman Spilde from The Daily Beast praised the episode's emotional attributes, stating, "By the episode's end, even the most icy-hearted of viewers will get choked up. Seeing how each Belcher selflessly helps one another through their dilemma is the perfect medicine for merry malaise. And it all peaks in one big, suspenseful climax with a huge emotional payoff, all in just 20 minutes. As Louise reads her poem—which turns out to be a sweet (well, for Louise) observation of what she loves about Christmas with her family—it's hard to shake the feeling that you're watching a new annual holiday classic."

Brittney Bender of Bleeding Cool gave the episode a 10/10, she explained her rating by saying, "Bob's Burgers makes a small yet vital message crystal clear to audiences…there's a lot of love in simply showing up for those we care about. It doesn't have to be in person to make the same impact. That's why this episode mattered so much. It wasn't Louise's parents brushing anything of hers off to the side; it was the often torturous results of scheduling conflicts and the realistic troubles of how truly present a parent can be with multiple children."

"The Plight Before Christmas" was submitted for the Outstanding Animated Program at the 75th Primetime Creative Arts Emmy Awards, and was one of the five nominees.
