= The Stepkids (album) =

Studio album by The Stepkids
- Released: September 27, 2011
- Genre: Psychedelic soul; indie rock; funk
- Length: 30:59
- Label: Stones Throw
- Producer: Dan Edinberg; Jeff Gitelman; Tim Walsh

The Stepkids chronology
The Stepkids (2011)	Troubadour (2013)

Singles from The Stepkids
- 1. "Shadows On Behalf" Released: 2011; 2. "Legend In My Own Mind" Released: 2011

Professional ratings
Aggregate scores
Source	Rating
Metacritic	74/100
Review scores
Source	Rating
AllMusic	4/5 stars
CLASH	7/10
Pitchfork	6.5/10

The Stepkids is the debut album by American band The Stepkids from Connecticut. It was released on September 27, 2011, through Stones Throw Records. Production was handled by Dan Edinberg, Jeff Gitelman and Tim Walsh.

Mojo placed the album at number 25 on its list of "Top 50 albums of 2011". SPIN also placed the album at number 19 on the list "20 Best R&B albums of 2011".

Music videos were released for "Suburban Dream" directed by Chris King, "Shadows on Behalf" directed by Mac Smullen, "Legend In My Own Mind" directed by Tom Scharpling, and "Wonderfox" directed by Henry DeMaio.

== Track listing ==
All tracks are written by Dan Edinberg, Jeff Gitelman and Tim Walsh.

No.	Title	Length
1.	"Intro"	1:02
2.	"Brain Ninja"	2:07
3.	"Suburban Dream"	3:14
4.	"Shadows on Behalf"	3:48
5.	"Legend in My Own Mind"	3:56
6.	"Santos and Ken"	3:33
7.	"La La"	5:39
8.	"Wonderfox"	3:23
9.	"Cup Half Full"	3:07
10.	"Outro"	1:10
Total length:		30:59

iTunes bonus track
No.	Title	Length
1.	"Old Gold"	4:13

== Personnel ==
- Dan Edinberg – vocals, bass, double bass (tracks: 6, 7), percussion (track 3), piano (tracks: 4, 9), synthesizer, violin (tracks: 5–9), recording, mixing, producer
- Jeff Gitelman – vocals, acoustic guitar (tracks: 1, 7), piano (track 8), synthesizer (track 9), recording, mixing, producer
- Tim Walsh – vocals, drums, percussion (tracks: 1–4, 7–10), recording, mixing, producer
- Meredith DiMenna – vocals (track 5)
- Clara Inés Schuhmacher – vocals (track 7)
- Fred DiLeone – clavinet (track 6), Wurlitzer electric piano (track 9)
- James Moss – congas (track 8)
- Jon Blanck – tenor saxophone (track 6)
- Kristian Henson – artwork
