= Amelia (Bob's Burgers) =

- Bob's Burgers episode
- Episode no.: Season 13; Episode 22
- Directed by: Matthew Long & Brian LoSchiavo
- Written by: Loren Bouchard
- Production code: CASA21
- Original air date: May 21, 2023

Guest appearances
- Brian Huskey as Regular-Sized Rudy; Andy Kindler as Mort; Paul Reubens as Pat; Andy Richter as Wayne; Jackie Quinn as Benj

Episode chronology
← Previous "Mother Author Laser Pointer"	Next → "Fight at the Not Okay Chore-ral"
- Bob's Burgers season 13

"Amelia" is the 22nd episode and the season finale of the thirteenth season of the American animated comedy series Bob's Burgers and is the 260th episode overall. It was written by Loren Bouchard and was directed by Matthew Long and Brian LoSchiavo. It originally aired in the US on Fox Broadcasting Company on May 21, 2023. The episode was dedicated to Paul Reubens in a re-airing on August 13, 2023.

== Plot ==
In a cold open, Louise begins her school project on Amelia Earhart using shadow puppets. The presentation is cut short and has to restart, as the flow was disrupted by classmate Wayne. A week prior, Ms. LaBonz assigns her class with a "My Hero" project, giving them a week to make a multimedia presentation of a historical figure. At the library, Louise notices a book on aviation pioneer Amelia Earhart that had fallen on the floor. Wayne looks over Louise's shoulder and disregards her choice of a hero, saying that it was a "publicity stunt". Wayne then gives Louise alternate choices for her hero project, but Louise just walks away.

At dinner, the Belcher family watches as Louise thoroughly reads her book on Earhart. After a few comments, Linda mentions that Mother's Day is coming up, but that she doesn't want anything fancy. In bed, Louise learns of the disappearance of Amelia Earhart. In school the next day, Louise asks Ms. LaBonz if she could switch her hero, but is declined as she would be too far behind. At home, Bob walks in on Louise looking at pictures of Earhart and her plane. While there, Bob tells his children about his plan for a Mother's Day gift for Linda: a massage from a masseur-in-training. Later that night, Louise has a nightmare of Wayne that she wakes up from with a newfound goal to get a better grade than Wayne.

On the way to school, Gene inadvertently gives Louise the idea to use puppets for her project. In school, Louise goes to the "puppet kid", Benj, for assistance on her project. Benj declines, stating that there wouldn't be enough time to do so. At the restaurant, Louise gets the idea to use shadow puppets after playing with napkins. Louise, with Tina, asks Benj if shadow puppets could work with the remaining time that is left. Benj seems to like the idea, so he agrees with helping Louise. Later that day, Louise works on making the paper cutouts in her room with her siblings. Tina asks Louise why she even decided to pick Amelia Earhart as her hero, which causes Louise to stress about the project even more.

On Mother's Day, Linda overhears Bob and Louise talking about Louise's project and how she doesn't want it to ruin Mother's Day. Suddenly, Pat, the masseur-in-training, rings the doorbell and Bob runs to the door in a panic, saying that it wasn't supposed to be rung. Bob helps Pat with lifting the massage table up the stairs, but Pat loses his grip and causes the table to slide back down and slam on the door, alerting everyone in the house. As Pat begins giving Linda the massage, Louise audibly gives up on her project as she starts ranting about Wayne. Linda asks Bob to get Louise so that she can talk to her. Linda talks to Louise about Earhart's mother, considering it was Mother's Day. She states that she helped grow up a confident woman that inspired many younger girls to be as confident as her. With Linda's speech, Louise regains confidence to finish her project.

In the ending scene, we see the final product of Louise's project. Louise states that people may think of Earhart only because of her failure, as she didn't complete her mission, but says people should also know how successful she was as well, noting her at-the-time advanced plane and her solo voyage across the Atlantic. Louise finishes her project saying that the story of Amelia Earhart helped grow many other confident women with their own respective stories. Ms. LaBonz and the rest of class applaud Louise. Ms. LaBonz notes that Wayne is next to present, who groans regretfully based on what he had said previously.

The end credits depict Louise and Linda working together on the former's project.

== Reception ==
Brittney Bender of Bleeding Cool gave the episode a 10/10 by stating, "Amelia Earhart's story was told with such profound respect and in a way that spoke to more experiences than simply hers. The speech from Louise, broken up throughout the episode, was phenomenal. Bob's Burgers gave Louise's character an amazing opportunity with this presentation and how they depicted the hero's story she told. When Linda confirmed with Louise that she never really had to convince her daughter that she could do anything, that struck a chord with me. Linda is an excellent mother and hilarious at every turn in this episode. I'm beyond impressed with the writing, directing, animation, and everything else from this season's finale."

Rebecca Mills of Hidden Remote praised the dynamic between Louise and Linda, saying, "Aside from the emphasis on Amelia, I really do feel like this episode showed the two strong personalities of Louise and Linda. Louise was so determined and she didn’t let anything deter her which is admirable. It was clear she wasn’t overly happy with her topic yet she made it work. That was in part to Linda who used their connection on Mother’s Day to help Louise out and make her feel valued."
