= I Used to Know Her: The Prelude =

EP by H.E.R.
- Released: August 3, 2018
- Length: 19:58
- Label: RCA
- Producer: Cardiak; Dernst "D'Mile" Emile II; Jeffrey Rashad; Flippa; Gitty; David "Swagg R'celious" Harris

H.E.R. chronology
H.E.R. (2017)	I Used to Know Her: The Prelude (2018)	I Used to Know Her: Part 2 (2018)

Singles from I Used to Know Her: The Prelude
- 1. "Could've Been" Released: September 25, 2018

I Used to Know Her: The Prelude is the fourth extended play (EP) by American singer and songwriter H.E.R. It was released on August 3, 2018, by RCA Records.

== Track listing ==
Credits adapted from Spotify.

No.	Title	Writer(s)	Producer(s)	Length
1.	"Lost Souls" (featuring DJ Scratch)	David "Swagg R'celious" Harris; Frederick Hibberts; Gabriella Wilson; Jeff "Gitty" Gitelman; Keithen Foster; Ms. Lauryn Hill; Tiara Thomas	Swagg R'celious; Gitty; Bassman Foster	2:33
2.	"Against Me"	Carl McCormick; Wilson; Hue "SoundzFire" Strother; Jeffrey Rashad Williams; Nima Jahanbin; Paimon Jahanbin	Cardiak; Wallis Lane; Jeffrey Rashad	4:30
3.	"Be on My Way (Interlude)"	Harris; Dernst "D'Mile" Emile II; Wilson; Sam Ashworth	Swagg R'celious; D'Mile	1:23
4.	"Could've Been" (featuring Bryson Tiller)	Harris; Emile; Wilson; Strother	D'Mile	4:08
5.	"Feel a Way"	Elijah Dias; Wilson; Strother; Gitelman; Ronald "Flippa" Colson	Gitty; Flippa	3:27
6.	"As I Am"	Dias; Wilson; Strother; Gitelman; Colson	Flippa; Gitty	4:00

== Charts ==
Chart performance for I Used to Know Her: The Prelude
Chart (2018)	Peak position
Canadian Albums (Billboard)	89
US Billboard 200	20
US Top R&B/Hip-Hop Albums (Billboard)	12

== Certifications ==
Certifications for I Used to Know Her: The Prelude
Region	Certification	Certified units/sales
Brazil (Pro-Música Brasil)	Gold	20,000^{‡}
^{‡} Sales+streaming figures based on certification alone.
