= Live at the Troubadour =

Live at the Troubadour may refer to:

- Gold: Recorded Live at the Troubadour, by Neil Diamond (1970)
- In Concert at the Troubadour, 1969, by Rick Nelson (1970)
- Live at the L.A. Troubadour, by Fairport Convention (1977)
- House Full: Live at the L.A. Troubadour, by Fairport Convention (1986)
- Live at the Troubadour 1969, by Tim Buckley (1994)
- Live at the Troubadour, by Glenn Yarbrough (1994)
- Live at the Troubadour (Kevin Gilbert & Thud album), (1999)
- Live at the Troubadour, by Phantom Planet (2004)
- Live at the Troubadour, by The Naked Trucker and T-Bones Show (2007)
- Live at the Troubadour, by Hall & Oates (2008)
- Live at the Troubadour (Carole King and James Taylor album), (2010)
- Live at the Troubadour, by Sarah Jarosz (2013)
