= Troubadour (The Stepkids album) =

Studio album by the Stepkids
- Released: September 10, 2013
- Genre: Alternative R&B; indie rock
- Length: 41:39
- Label: Stones Throw
- Producer: Dan Edinberg; Jeff Gitelman; Tim Walsh

The Stepkids chronology
The Stepkids (2011)	Troubadour (2013)

Singles from Troubadour
- 1. "Sweet Salvation" Released: October 19, 2012; 2. "The Lottery" Released: 2013

Professional ratings
Aggregate scores
Source	Rating
Metacritic	76/100
Review scores
Source	Rating
AllMusic	3/5 stars
Exclaim!	6/10
Pitchfork	7.3/10

Troubadour is the second studio album by American band the Stepkids from Connecticut. It was released on September 10, 2013, through Stones Throw Records. It was produced by Dan Edinberg, Jeff Gitelman, and Tim Walsh.

There were four music videos released from the album: "Sweet Salvation" directed by Jesse Mann, "The Lottery" directed by Nicki Chavoya and Lisa Amadeo, "The Art of Forgetting" directed by Georgia, and "Moving Pictures" directed by Henry Demaio.

== Track listing ==
All tracks are written by Dan Edinberg, Jeff Gitelman and Tim Walsh, except for track 3 written with Matthew Martin and Sydney Bennett.

No.	Title	Length
1.	"Memoirs of Grey"	2:35
2.	"The Lottery"	3:50
3.	"Desert in the Dark"	4:35
4.	"Insecure Troubadour"	4:08
5.	"Sweet Salvation"	5:00
6.	"Symmetry"	4:46
7.	"Moving Pictures"	4:50
8.	"Bitter Bug"	4:30
9.	"Brutal Honesty"	2:31
10.	"The Art of Forgetting"	4:54
Total length:		41:39

== Personnel ==
- Dan Edinberg – vocals, bass, double bass (upright bass), synthesizer, keyboards, recording, mixing, producer
- Jeff Gitelman – vocals, guitar, guitar synthesizer, keyboards, recording, mixing, producer
- Tim Walsh – vocals, drums, percussion, timpani, recording, mixing, producer
- Michael Faust – voice (track 1)
- Christyn Martino – voice (track 2)
- Jessica Erzen – voice (track 2)
- Erik Elligers – tenor saxophone (track 2)
- John Panos – trumpet (track 2)
- David Pond – turntables (track 2)
- Matthew Martin – keyboards (track 3)
- Jon Blanck – flute (track 7)
- Ben Dean – violin (track 7)
- Fred DiLeone – clavinet (track 8)
- Joel Edinberg – alto and baritone saxophone (track 8)
- Matt Oestreicher – organ (track 9)
- Dave Cooley – mastering
- Jeff Jank – art direction
- Thomas Brendan – artwork, design
