= Jeff Gitelman =

Moldovan record producer (born 1982)

Jeff "Gitty" Gitelman
- Also known as: Gitty
- Born: February 5, 1982 (age 44)
- Origin: Kishinev, Moldavian SSR, Soviet Union
- Genres: R&B; soul; funk; jazz
- Occupations: Record producer; singer; songwriter
- Years active: 1996–present
- Formerly of: The Stepkids

Jeff "Gitty" Gitelman (born February 5, 1982) is a record producer, musician, and songwriter from Chișinău, Moldova. He is known for his work with the band the Stepkids, which formed in 2010 and for his composition, production, and providing instrumentation for J. Cole, H.E.R., Jennifer Lopez, Mac Miller and Anderson .Paak. Gitelman was nominated for a Grammy Award for Album of the Year for his work on H.E.R.'s 2019 album, I Used to Know Her.

== Early life ==
Jeff Gitelman was born on February 5, 1982, to a Jewish family in Soviet-ruled Moldavia. He and his family emigrated from Chișinău in 1991 and moved to New Haven, Connecticut. His interest in music developed in his early childhood when he found a guitar in a trash can and his father refurbished it. He then learned to speak English through playing and listening to Western music, notably the Beatles.

== Career ==
=== Performing ===
Gitelman's music career began while attending Amity Regional High School in Woodbridge, Connecticut. After graduating from there he attended Berklee College of Music in Boston. His first professional job was recording and touring with Lauryn Hill, leading to being hired as a touring guitarist for Alicia Keys and performances with Stevie Wonder, David Bowie, Chance the Rapper, and others.

=== The Stepkids ===
In 2010, Gitelman, along with Tim Walsh and Dan Edinberg formed the Stepkids, a psychedelic soul band. They released their debut self-titled album The Stepkids in 2011 under Stones Throw Records. The band toured and collaborated with Kimbra, Mayer Hawthorne, and Aloe Blacc.

=== Independent work and production ===
After working with the Stepkids, Gitelman moved to Los Angeles to focus on production. His guitar, production, composition, and writing is featured on J. Cole's 2014 Forest Hills Drive, H.E.R.'s I Used to Know Her, Anderson .Paak's Oxnard, Donnie Trumpet's Surf, Mac Miller's Swimming and The Divine Feminine, and ASAP Ferg's Always Strive and Prosper. He has worked with Camila Cabello, Ty Dolla $ign, Jeremih, Kid Ink, Trey Songz, Rick Ross, and others.

== Education ==
Gitelman has worked in music education, serving on the panel of Music Industry Advisors at the 2015 Grammy Camp in Los Angeles, and conducting lectures and seminars on composition, production, music business, and performance. The camp works with young musicians throughout the U.S. In 2005, he co-founded the American Roots Music program, an initiative to teach young adults grades 1-12 the history of American music through performance and lecture. In 2015, he was inducted into his alma mater Amity High School's hall of fame. In 2016, Gitelman founded the Duality School of Music which began programming during the Fall 2017 semester at Amity High School.

== Discography ==
=== With The Stepkids ===
- The Stepkids (2011)
- Direct To Disc – Stones Throw Records Live Album (2012)
- Troubadour (2013)
- Wanderers EP (2011)

=== Solo work ===
- "Karaoke" ft. Trinidad James (2018)
- "Stranger Than Fiction" (2017)

== Production, composition, and writing discography ==
=== 2023 ===
Hozier - Eat Your Young

- 3. "Through Me (The Flood)"

=== 2022 ===
The Weeknd - Dawn FM

- 6. "A Tale By Quincy"

=== 2021 ===
Jorja Smith - Be Right Back

- 3. "Bussdown" (feat. Shaybo)
- 6. "Burn"

=== 2020 ===
Alina Baraz - It Was Divine

- 8. "Night And Morning"
- 14. "Be Good"
- 15. "Until I Met You (feat. Nas)"

Kelly Clarkson

- 1. "I Dare You"

KSI – Dissimulation

- 1. "What You Been On"

Mac Miller – Circles

- 13. "Right"

Chloe x Halle – Ungodly Hour

- 7. "Busy Boy"
- 11. "Don't Make It Harder on Me"

Usher

- 1. "I Cry"

=== 2019 ===
Allen Stone

- "Sweaters"

Boogie – Everythings for Sale

- 01. "Tired/Reflections"

Brandy

- "Freedom Rings"

Childish Major – Dirt Road Diamond

- 01. "Necessary Pressure"
- 02. "To My Little Homies"
- 04. "For You"

Dinah Jane

- "SZNS" ft. A Boogie wit da Hoodie

Gallant – Sweet Insomnia

- 11. "Sleep On It"

H.E.R. – I Used to Know Her

- 01. "Lost Souls" ft. DJ Scratch
- 06. "Can't Help Me"
- 08. "Feel A Way"
- 09. "21"
- 10. "Racks" ft. YBN Cordae
- 15. "Take You There"
- 16. "As I Am"

JoJo

- "Joanna"

SiR – Chasing Summer

- 02. "John Redcorn"

Terrace Martin

- "Intimidated"

=== 2018 ===
Anderson .Paak – Oxnard

- 03. "Tints" ft. Kendrick Lamar

Camila Cabello – Camila

- 02. "All These Years"

Chic – It's About Time

- TBA. "Till the World Falls" (ft. Mura Masa, Cosha and Vic Mensa)

Jacob Banks – Village

- 04. "Prosecco"

Mac Miller – Swimming

- 01. "Come Back to Earth"
- 07. "Ladders"

Nao – Saturn

- 10. "Drive and Disconnect"

=== 2017 ===
Trey Songz – Tremaine the Album

- 08. "She Lovin It"

Jeremih

- "Think of You" (ft. Chris Brown & Big Sean)

Rick Ross – Rather You Than Me

- 10. "Scientology" (composition)

=== 2016 ===
Mac Miller – The Divine Feminine

- 05. "Cinderella" (ft. Ty Dolla Sign)

A$AP Ferg – Always Strive and Prosper

- 01. "Rebirth"
- 05. "Psycho"

=== 2015 ===
Donnie Trumpet & The Social Experiment – Surf

- 01. "Miracle"
- 02. "Slip Slide"
- 03. "Warm Enough"
- 05. "Wanna Be Cool"
- 10. "SmthnthtIwnt"
- 11. "Go"

Karmin – Leo Rising

- 07. "Along the Road"

Logic – The Incredible True Story

- 18. "The Incredible True Story"

Outasight – Big Trouble

=== 2014 ===
Pharoahe Monch – PTSD

- 16. "Eht Dnarg Noisulli"

=== 2011 ===
Jennifer Hudson – I Remember Me

- guitar

=== 2009 ===
Alicia Keys – The Element of Freedom

- guitar

== Awards and nominations ==
Year	Nominee / work	Award	Result	Ref.
2020	I Used to Know Her	Grammy Award for Album of the Year	Nominated	
2024	"On My Mama"	Record of the Year	Nominated	
2024	"On My Mama"	Best R&B Song	Nominated	
