= Bekon =

American record producer and songwriter

- Also known as: Danny Keyz
- Born: Daniel Tannenbaum
- Genres: Hip hop; West Coast hip hop; trap; R&B
- Occupations: Songwriter; record producer; singer
- Instruments: Vocals; keyboards
- Years active: 2010–present

Daniel "Danny" Tannenbaum, known professionally as Bekon (sometimes stylized as Bēkon), previously known as Danny Keyz, is an American record producer, songwriter and musician.

== Career ==
As Danny Keyz, he collaborated closely with his mentor DJ Khalil, contributing music to Eminem's album Recovery including working on the tracks "25 to Life" and "Almost Famous", Dr. Dre's song "Kush" and Drake's single "Fear". He also collaborated with the producer Emile Haynie on Emeli Sandé's "My Kind of Love".

Bekon provided composition and instrumentation for the Lecrae album Gravity, which won the Grammy Award for Best Gospel Album in 2012. He also provided production and vocals for at least eight tracks on Kendrick Lamar's album DAMN., which went on to win a Grammy Award and Pulitzer Prize in 2018, and production and composition for H.E.R.'s album I Used to Know Her- nominated for a Grammy Award in 2020. His own album, Get with the Times, was released in 2018.

In 2017, after being credited with providing production and additional vocals for Kendrick Lamar's Damn, Bekon's identity was revealed to be Daniel Tannenbaum.

== Discography ==
=== Solo albums ===
Title	Album details
Get With The Times	Released: January 24, 2018

=== Songs produced, written, or performed on by Bekon ===
Artist – Title	Year	Certifications	Album
Dahi – "Stand for Something"	2026		Black Boy (Alternative)
Big L - "Stretch & Bobbito Freestyle ('98)"	2025		Harlem's Finest: Return of the King
Joji – 1AM Freestyle	2022		Smithereens
Kendrick Lamar – Father Time	2022		Mr. Morale & the Big Steppers
Kendrick Lamar – We Cry Together	2022		Mr. Morale & the Big Steppers
Kendrick Lamar – Auntie Diaries	2022		Mr. Morale & the Big Steppers
Kendrick Lamar – Mirror	2022		Mr. Morale & the Big Steppers
88rising & Simu Liu – Hot Soup	2021		Shang Chi and the Legend of the Ten Rings
DPR LIVE, DPR IAN & peace – Diamonds + And Pearls	2021		Shang Chi and the Legend of the Ten Rings
Warren Hue & Seori – Warriors	2021		Shang Chi and the Legend of the Ten Rings
Rich Brian, Warren Hue & Guapdad 4000 – Foolish	2021		Shang Chi and the Legend of the Ten Rings
JJ Lin – Lose Control	2021		Shang Chi and the Legend of the Ten Rings
Rich Brian & EARTHGANG – Act Up	2021		Shang Chi and the Legend of the Ten Rings
NIKI, Rich Brian & Warren Hue – Always Rising	2021		Shang Chi and the Legend of the Ten Rings
Yung Bae – Wonder	2021		
easy life – a message to myself	2021		life's a beach
Joji – Ew	2020		Nectar
Joji – Gimme Love	2020	RIAA: Gold (US)	Nectar
Joji – Gimme Love (Live Band Version)	2020		
NIKI – Drive On	2020		MOONCHILD
NIKI – If There's Nothing Left...	2020		MOONCHILD
NIKI – Wide Open (Foreword)	2020		MOONCHILD
NIKI – Nightcrawlers	2020		MOONCHILD
NIKI – Pandemonium	2020		MOONCHILD
NIKI – Lose	2020		MOONCHILD
Rich Brian – Love in My Pocket (Remix)	2020		
Rich Brian – Love in My Pocket	2020		1999
Joji – Gimme Love (Channel Tres Remix)	2020		
Rich Brian & Guapdad 4000 – BALI	2020		NBA 2K21 Next Gen Soundtrack
Rich Brian – Drive Safe (A COLORS SHOW)	2019		
Scarlxrd – PRXSPER	2019		IMMXRTALISATIXN
H.E.R. - Lord Is Coming (Remix)	2019		I Used to Know Her
Kid Bloom – Circles	2019		Lemonhead
Rich Brian – The Sailor (Album)	2019		The Sailor
Baby Keem – HONEST	2019		DIE FOR MY BITCH
Baby Keem – MOSHPIT	2019		DIE FOR MY BITCH
ScHoolboy Q – Drunk	2019		CrasH Talk
ScHoolboy Q – Lies	2019		CrasH Talk
Higher Brothers – Do It Like Me	2019		Five Stars
Big K.R.I.T. - Learned from Texas	2018		TDT
H.E.R. - Lord Is Coming	2018		I Used to Know Her: Part 2 – EP
H.E.R. - Fate	2018		I Used to Know Her: Part 2 – EP
Grassu XXL & Guess Who – Pentru un gram de atenție	2018		În labirint
Jorja Smith – I Am	2018		Black Panther: The Album (Music from and Inspired By)
Kendrick Lamar, U2 and Dave Chappelle – 2018 Grammys Performance	2018		
Bekon – America	2018		Get With The Times
Bekon – 17	2018		Get With The Times
Bekon – Catch Me If You Can	2018		Get With The Times
Bekon – Mama Olivia	2018		Get With The Times
Bekon – Oxygen	2018		Get With The Times
Bekon – In Your Honor	2018		Get With The Times
Bekon – 30	2018		Get With The Times
Bekon – Candy and Promises	2018		Get With The Times
Bekon – 10pm Soda Break	2018		Get With The Times
Bekon – Get With The Times	2018		Get With The Times
Matoma – Slow (CID Remix)	2018		Slow (Remixes)
Matoma – Slow (Devault Remix)	2018		Slow (Remixes)
Matoma – Slow (R3HAB Remix)	2018		Slow (Remixes)
Bekon – Cold as Ice	2017		Get With The Times
LOLAWOLF – Baby I'm Dyin'	2017		
Matoma – Slow	2017		One in a Million
Big K.R.I.T. - Big K.R.I.T.	2017		4eva Is a Mighty Long Time
Big K.R.I.T. - Miss Georgia Fornia	2017		4eva Is a Mighty Long Time
Big K.R.I.T. - Justin Scott	2017		4eva Is a Mighty Long Time
SZA – Garden (Say It Like Dat)	2017	RIAA: Platinum (US)	Ctrl
Guess Who – Aha!	2017		Un Anonim Celebru
Guess Who – Un Anonim Celebru	2017		Un Anonim Celebru
Kendrick Lamar – BLOOD.	2017	RIAA: Gold (US, CAN)	Damn
Kendrick Lamar – ELEMENT.	2017	RIAA: Gold (US, CAN)	Damn
Kendrick Lamar – DUCKWORTH.	2017	RIAA: Gold (US, CAN)	Damn
Kendrick Lamar – GOD.	2017	RIAA: Platinum (US), 2× Platinum (CAN)	Damn
Kendrick Lamar – FEAR.	2017	RIAA: Gold (US, CAN)	Damn
Kendrick Lamar – XXX.	2017	RIAA: Gold (US), Platinum (CAN)	Damn
Kendrick Lamar – PRIDE.	2017	RIAA: Gold (US), Platinum (CAN)	Damn
Kendrick Lamar – YAH.	2017	RIAA: Gold (CAN, US)	Damn
Big Sean – Voices In My Head / Stick to the Plan	2017		I Decided.
A$AP Ferg – Grandma	2016		Always Strive and Prosper
A$AP Ferg – Beautiful People	2016		Always Strive and Prosper
A$AP Ferg – Rebirth	2016		Always Strive and Prosper
A$AP Ferg – Psycho	2016		Always Strive and Prosper
Dr. Dre – All in a Day's Work	2015		Compton
Eminem – Kings Never Die	2015	RIAA: Gold (US)	Southpaw (Music From And Inspired by the Motion Picture)
Gin Wigmore – This Old Heart	2015		Blood to Bone
Emile Haynie – Fool Me Too	2015		We Fall
BJ the Chicago Kid – Man Down	2015		In My Mind
Big K.R.I.T. - Cadillactica	2014		Cadillactica
Aloe Blacc – Can You Do This	2013		Lift Your Spirit
Emeli Sandé – My Kind of Love (Remix)	2013		Cadillactica
DOM KENNEDY – Erica Part 2	2013		Get Home Safely
Aloe Blacc – The Man	2013	RIAA: Platinum (US, UK AUS), 2× Platinum (SE, DEN), Gold (IT, NZ)	Wake Me Up (EP)
Lecrae – Fallin' Down (Remix by Black Knight)	2012		Gravity: The Remix EP
Lecrae – Mayday (Remix by Big Juice)	2012		Gravity: The Remix EP
P!nk – Here Comes the Weekend	2012		The Truth About Love
Lecrae – Mayday	2012		Gravity
Emeli Sandé – My Kind of Love (RedOne and Alex P Remix)	2012		Our Version of Events (Deluxe Edition)
Emeli Sandé – My Kind of Love	2012	BPI: Silver ARIA: Gold	Our Version of Events
Evidence – It Wasn't Me	2011		Cats & Dogs
The Game – Ricky	2011		The R.E.D. Album
The Game – Drug Test	2011		Hoodmorning (No Typo): Candy Coronas
Professor Green – Nightmares	2011		At Your Inconvenience
Bad Meets Evil – Echo	2011		Hell: The Sequel
Snoop Dogg – I Don't Need No Bitch	2011		Doggumentary
Dr. Dre – Kush	2010		Detox
Eminem – Almost Famous	2010		Recovery
Eminem – 25 to Life	2010	RIAA: Gold (US)	Recovery
Cypress Hill – Take My Pain	2010		Rise Up
Clipse – Footsteps	2009		Til the Casket Drops
Drake – Fear	2009		So Far Gone
Lisa "Left Eye" Lopes – Listen	2009		Eye Legacy
RZA – Long Time Coming	2008		Digi Snacks
