= H.E.R. =

American singer (born 1997)

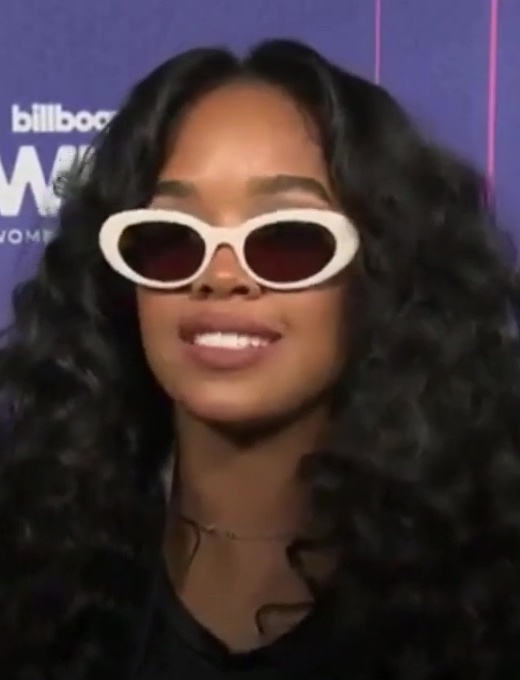
- H.E.R. in 2022

Background information
- Also known as: Gabi Wilson
- Born: Gabriella Sarmiento Wilson; June 27, 1997 (age 29); Vallejo, California, U.S.
- Genre: R&B
- Occupations: Singer-songwriter, actress
- Instruments: Vocals; guitar
- Years active: 2011–present
- Labels: RCA; MBK
- Website: her-official.com

Gabriella Sarmiento Wilson (born June 27, 1997), known professionally as H.E.R. (pronounced as "her"; standing for "Having Everything Revealed"), is an American R&B singer, songwriter, and actress. She has received an Academy Award, a Children's and Family Emmy Award, and five Grammy Awards, as well as nominations for a Golden Globe Award, three American Music Awards, and four Billboard Music Awards.

After initially recording under her birth name, Wilson adopted the stage name H.E.R. in 2016 and signed with RCA Records. She released her debut extended play (EP), H.E.R. Volume 1, in September of that year. Her first compilation album, H.E.R. (2017), peaked at number 23 on the Billboard 200 and earned five Grammy Award nominations, winning Best R&B Album and Best R&B Performance for "Best Part", a collaboration with Daniel Caesar. Her second compilation album, I Used to Know Her (2019), also received five Grammy Award nominations, including Album of the Year and Song of the Year for "Hard Place".

In 2021, H.E.R. won the Academy Award for Best Original Song for "Fight for You", from Judas and the Black Messiah, and the Grammy Award for Song of the Year for "I Can't Breathe". Her debut studio album, Back of My Mind (2021), peaked at number six on the Billboard 200. In 2022, she won the Children's and Family Emmy Award for her contributions to the animated children's series We the People (2021).

Through her career H.E.R. acted in film and television specials, including in the second film adaptation of The Color Purple (2023), being nominated with the cast at the Critics' Choice Movie Award and Screen Actors Guild Award. She also voiced animated series and films, including DreamWorks' Forgotten Island (2026).

== Early life and family ==
Gabriella Sarmiento Wilson was born on June 27, 1997, in Vallejo, California, to an African-American father and a Filipina mother from Cabanatuan City, Nueva Ecija, and raised in California's San Francisco Bay Area. According to an interview with Guitar Center, Wilson's father was a musician in a cover band, and hosted their practice sessions in the family's living room. She appeared in the 2023 edition of the Crossroads Guitar Festival performing with her father.

Additionally, members of her mother's extended family were guitarists, drummers and bassists, as well as vocalists, often playing for karaoke events. Wilson states that these were some of her earliest influences, musically.

== Career ==
=== 2007–2011: Career beginnings ===
At age ten, performing as Gabi Wilson, she played an Alicia Keys song on the piano for the Today Show and at the famed Apollo Theater (Harlem, New York City) on September 23, 2007, covering Aretha Franklin's "Freeway of Love". She made her acting debut in the Nickelodeon television film School Gyrls, written and directed by Nick Cannon, which premiered in February 2010. She also performed on Maury (2007), and Good Morning America and The View (both in 2008). At this time, she was managed by Will Smith's Overbrook Entertainment. She performed at age 12 at the 2010 BET Awards, covering Keys' 2001 hit "Fallin'", sang a tribute to Keys at the ASCAP Awards, and competed on Radio Disney's The Next BIG Thing at age 12, with her song "My Music", featured on Radio Disney.

=== 2011–2016: Signing with RCA ===
Wilson signed a record deal with Sony's RCA Records via J Records in a deal arranged by her manager Jeff Robinson's MBK Entertainment in 2011 when she was 14. In 2014, her debut single, "Something to Prove", was released under her real name.

=== 2016–2019: Breakthrough and I Used to Know Her ===
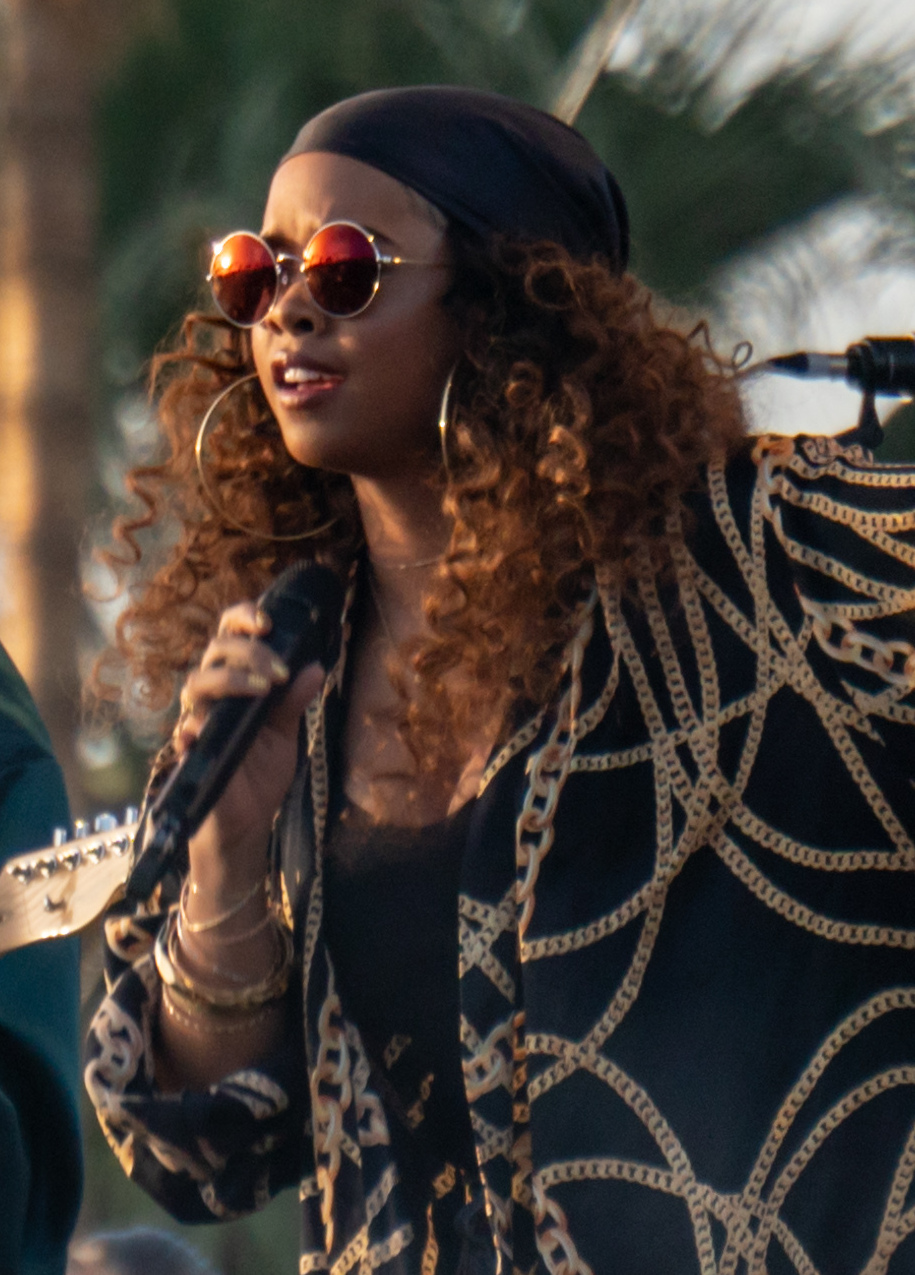
H.E.R. performing in 2018

Rebranding in 2016 with the new H.E.R. persona, Wilson released her debut EP, H.E.R. Vol. 1, on September 9, 2016, produced by songwriter David "Swagg R'Celious" Harris. She received support from Usher, Tyrese, Pusha T, and Wyclef Jean; labelmates Alicia Keys and Bryson Tiller helped get the word out through Twitter co-signs, shoutouts, and re-posts. In April 2017, Barbadian singer Rihanna posted an Instagram clip with H.E.R.'s track "Focus" playing in the background. The clip has been viewed over five million times. Additional industry support came from Issa Rae of HBO's Insecure, Taraji P. Henson of Empire, Kylie Jenner, and Kendall Jenner.

NPR listed H.E.R. Vol. 1 as the first selection in its "5 Essential R&B Albums You Slept On". Calling the music "Slow-burning R&B that zooms in on emotional highs and lows," Rolling Stone included H.E.R. in its March 2017 "10 Artists You Need To Know" roundup. Forbes named her one of "5 Alternative R&B Artists to Look Out for in 2017", reporting: "In the same vein as The Weeknd's enigmatic introduction to the world, H.E.R.'s image remains a mystery. The irony, though, is that her moniker is an acronym for Having Everything Revealed."

Wilson's follow-up EP, H.E.R. Vol. 2 (2017), also produced by Harris, was released on June 16, 2017, and includes the single "Say It Again". She went on tour with Bryson Tiller for the Set It Off tour, and concluded her first headlining tour, the Lights On Tour, in support of H.E.R. Vol. 2. She released H.E.R. Vol. 2, The B Sides (2017), produced by Harris, on October 20, 2017, and the single "2" on October 13, 2017. The compilation album H.E.R. was released on October 20, 2017, comprising the songs from each of the three EPs in this series. The album won Best R&B Album and received four other nominations at the 61st Grammy Awards, including Album of the Year and Best New Artist.

In 2018, she opened for Chris Brown's "Heartbreak on a Full Moon Tour". Wilson announced in September 2018 the I Used to Know H.E.R. Tour in support of her EP series I Used to Know Her: The Prelude and I Used to Know Her: Part 2. Her second compilation album I Used to Know Her was released on August 30, 2019. She performed as one of the headliners of the 2019 Global Citizen Festival in Central Park, New York on September 28. On October 5, she participated in the 2019 edition of the Rock in Rio festival located in Rio de Janeiro, Brazil. Among the headliners were Drake, Foo Fighters, Bon Jovi, Red Hot Chili Peppers, Iron Maiden, Pink and Muse.

=== 2020–present: Back of My Mind and acting debut ===
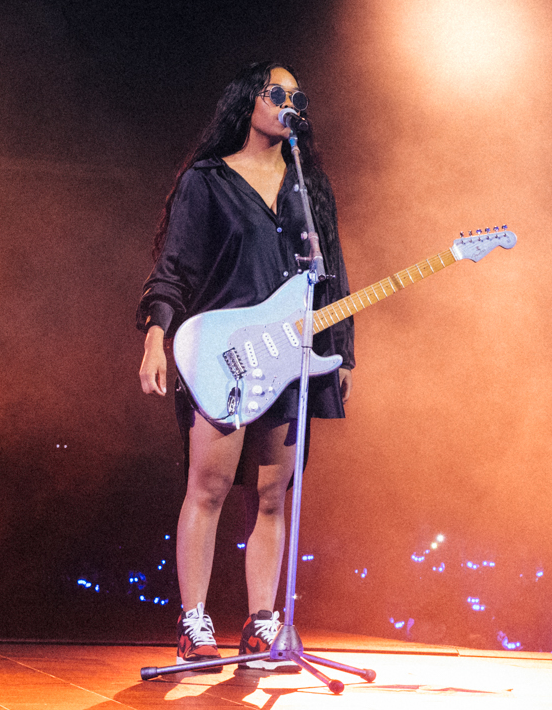
H.E.R. performing as opening act for Coldplay's Music of the Spheres World Tour in 2022

On September 20, 2020, she sang Prince's song "Nothing Compares 2 U" for the In Memoriam segment of the 72nd Primetime Emmy Awards. In February 2021, during the pregame festivities for Super Bowl LV, she performed "America the Beautiful", singing and playing guitar. On June 17, 2021, her single "Damage" topped the US R&B radio chart. The song is from her debut full-length album, Back of My Mind, which was released on June 18, 2021, receiving two nominations for Album of the Year and Best R&B Album at the 64th Annual Grammy Awards.

In 2021 she dueted with Tauren Wells on the song "Hold Us Together". In July 2021 she performed a song about citizenship on Netflix TV series We the People, making her winner of the Children's and Family Emmy Award for Outstanding Short Form Program.

H.E.R. made her acting debut as Belle on the Disney musical television special Beauty and the Beast: A 30th Celebration, while she starred as Mary "Squeak" Agnes in the 2023 film adaptation of The Color Purple, directed by Blitz Bazawule, being nominated with the cast at the Screen Actors Guild Awards and winning an NAACP Image Award.

In 2023 she performed at Eric Clapton's Crossroads Guitar Festival with her father and John Mayer both guesting on guitar.

H.E.R. joined Usher's performance at Super Bowl LVIII on February 11, 2024, playing electric guitar during "U Got It Bad" and "Bad Girl." On February 13, 2024, H.E.R. announced a new management deal with Lighthouse Management + Media, whose founder Aleen Keshishian also represents singers Olivia Rodrigo and Selena Gomez. The move came after legal disputes with Wilson's previous management, MBK Entertainment, which included Wilson filing a lawsuit to be released from the MBK label.

On October 29, 2025, The Hollywood Reporter announced that H.E.R. would voice Jo, one of the main characters in the DreamWorks animated film Forgotten Island, which was released on September 25, 2026.

== Musical style ==
Consisting mostly of R&B ballads, H.E.R.'s songs have been described as "downcast post-breakup material that sounded vulnerable and assured at once". In an interview, H.E.R. mentioned that she grew up listening to Filipino ballad singers such as Sharon Cuneta and Jay R. H.E.R. has also credited the singer Prince as one of her biggest influences. She has also cited artists such as Lenny Kravitz, Lauryn Hill, Stevie Wonder, Alicia Keys, Jimi Hendrix, John Mayer, and B.B. King as influences.

Addressing the secrecy over her identity, she has said: "The mystery is a metaphor for who I am, or who I was at the time of creating the project... I feel like oftentimes we don't like to be open as people about our emotions or things that we are going through. At the time [of recording], I was very closed off except for when I was writing or when I was in the studio."

She explained further: "I am a voice for women who feel like they're alone in these situations. This project came from emotion, and that's what I want it to be about – not what I look like or who I'm with, but the raw emotion and support for women." To NPR she said, "I feel like this is the era of the anti-star. I really just wanted it to be about the music, and get away from, 'Who is she with?' and 'What is she wearing?'"

== Media appearances ==
H.E.R. appeared as herself in the movie Yes Day (2021). She performed her original song "Change" on the episode "Active Citizenship" of the 2021 Netflix educational animated series We the People. On July 20, 2022, it was announced H.E.R. would be singing the role of Belle for ABC's Beauty and the Beast: A 30th Celebration. The television special aired on December 15, 2022. She sang "The Star-Spangled Banner" at Game 1 of the 2023 World Series between the Texas Rangers and Arizona Diamondbacks. On October 28, 2023, she made a surprise appearance on Saturday Night Live, performing “The Glass” with Foo Fighters. She made her big-screen acting debut in The Color Purple, which was released in theaters on December 25, 2023.

On August 11, 2024, she sang "The Star-Spangled Banner" during the closing ceremony of the 2024 Summer Olympics in Paris, France as part of the handover ceremony from Paris to Los Angeles, host of the 2028 Summer Olympics.

== Discography ==
=== Studio albums ===
- Back of My Mind (2021)

== Filmography ==
=== Film ===
Year	Title	Role	Notes	Ref
2017	Erma	Erma	Short film	
2021	Yes Day	Herself		
2023	The Color Purple	Mary "Squeak" Agnes	Film debut	
2026	Earth, Wind & Fire (To Be Celestial vs That's the Weight of the World)	Herself	Documentary	
2026	Forgotten Island	Jo	Voice role	

=== Television ===
Year	Title	Role	Notes
2009	School Gyrls	Gabi	Television film
2020	Saturday Night Live	Herself	Episode: "Adele/H.E.R."
2021	We the People	Performer	Episode: "Active Citizenship"
2022	Beauty and the Beast: A 30th Celebration	Belle	Special
2022	Blue's Clues & You!	T.Rex (voice)	Episode: "Blue's Dino Clues"
2022	Bob's Burgers	Aliah (voice)	Episode: "The Plight Before Christmas"

== Tours ==
=== Headlining tours ===
- Lights on Tour (2017)
- I Used to Know Her Tour (2018)
- Back of My Mind Tour (2021)

=== Supporting ===
- Bryson Tiller – Set It Off Tour (2017)
- Chris Brown – Heartbreak on a Full Moon Tour (2018)
- Childish Gambino – This Is America Tour (2019)
- Coldplay – Music of the Spheres World Tour (2022)
- Jhené Aiko – Ark to Agartha (2027)
