= Summer Walker discography =

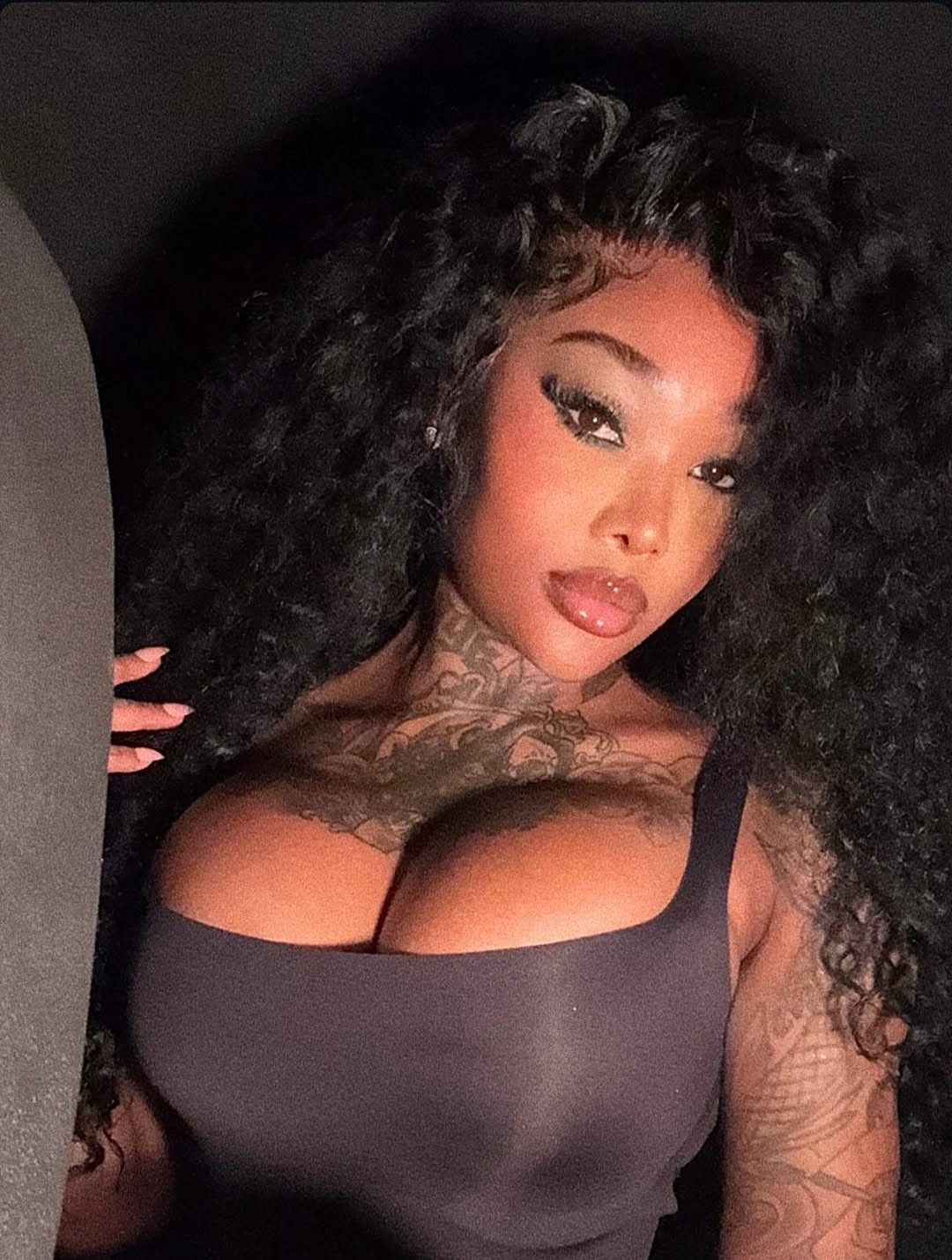
- Walker in 2025
- Studio albums: 3
- Singles: 30
- Mixtapes: 1
- EPs: 3
- Compilations: 2

American singer Summer Walker has released three studio albums, three extended plays, one mixtape, thirty singles, and multiple music videos.

== Albums ==
=== Studio albums ===
List of albums, with selected chart positions
Title	Details	Peak chart position										Certifications
Title	Details	US	US R&B /HH	US R&B	AUS	CAN	IRE	NLD	NZ	UK	UK R&B	Certifications
Over It	Released: October 4, 2019; Labels: LVRN, Interscope; Formats: CD, LP, digital download, streaming	2	1	1	17	4	32	14	16	7	7	RIAA: 3× Platinum; ARIA: Gold; BPI: Platinum; MC: Platinum; RMNZ: Platinum
Still Over It	Released: November 5, 2021; Labels: LVRN, Interscope; Formats: CD, LP, digital download, streaming	1	1	1	18	3	22	8	13	5	3	RIAA: Platinum; BPI: Gold; RMNZ: Gold
Finally Over It	Released: November 14, 2025; Labels: LVRN, Interscope; Formats: CD, LP, digital download, streaming	2	1	1	19	12	90	20	16	13	4	

=== Mixtapes ===
List of mixtapes, with selected chart positions
Title	Details	Peak chart position				Certifications
Title	Details	US	US R&B /HH	US R&B	CAN	Certifications
Last Day of Summer	Released: October 19, 2018; Labels: LVRN, Interscope; Formats: LP, digital download, streaming	44	25	6	72	RIAA: Platinum; BPI: Gold; RMNZ: Platinum

=== Compilation albums ===
List of mixtapes, with selected chart positions
Title	Details	Peak chart position
Title	Details	US Sales
Last Day of Summer + Clear	Released: September 26, 2020; Labels: LVRN, Interscope; Formats: LP	79
Clear: The Series	Released: June 23, 2023; Labels: LVRN, Interscope; Formats: CD, LP, cassette	—
"—" denotes items which were not released in that country or failed to chart.

== Extended plays ==
List of extended plays, with selected chart positions
Title	Details	Peak chart position			
Title	Details	US	US R&B /HH	US R&B	CAN
Clear	Released: January 25, 2019; Label: LVRN, Interscope; Format: Digital download, streaming	—	—	23	—
Life on Earth	Released: July 10, 2020; Label: LVRN, Interscope; Format: Digital download, streaming	8	6	1	57
Clear 2: Soft Life	Released: May 19, 2023; Label: LVRN, Interscope; Format: Digital download, streaming	26	7	4	—
"—" denotes items which were not released in that country or failed to chart.

== Singles ==
=== As lead artist ===
List of singles as lead artist, with selected chart positions, showing year released and album name
Title	Year	Peak chart positions										Certifications	Album
Title	Year	US	US R&B /HH	US R&B	AUS	CAN	IRE	NZ Hot	UK	UK R&B	WW	Certifications	Album
"Session 32" (Note: "Session 32" Re-release Live Version in Over It – Complete Set and Finally Over It (Cocktail Hour))	2018	—	—	—	—	—	—	—	—	—	—	RIAA: 2× Platinum; ARIA: Platinum; BPI: Gold; MC: Gold; RMNZ: Platinum	Non-album single
"CPR"	2018	—	—	—	—	—	—	—	—	—	—	RIAA: Platinum; RMNZ: Gold	Last Day of Summer
"Girls Need Love"	2018	— (Note: "Girls Need Love" did not enter the Billboard Hot 100 chart, but peaked at number six on the Bubbling Under Hot 100 chart.)	— (Note: "Girls Need Love" did not enter the Hot R&B/Hip-Hop Songs chart, but peaked at number one on the Bubbling Under R&B/Hip-Hop Singles chart.)	8	—	—	—	25	—	—	—	RIAA: 9× Platinum; RMNZ: 4× Platinum	Last Day of Summer
"Girls Need Love (Remix)" (with Drake)	2019	37	16	2	78	45	70	8	41	18	—	ARIA: 3× Platinum; BPI: 2× Platinum; MC: 3× Platinum	Last Day of Summer & Over It
"Playing Games" (solo or featuring Bryson Tiller)	2019	16	9	2	83	43	76	15	24	16	—	RIAA: 6× Platinum; ARIA: 2× Platinum; BPI: Platinum; MC: 2× Platinum; RMNZ: 3× Platinum	Over It
"Stretch You Out" (featuring A Boogie wit da Hoodie)	2019	68	33	8	—	—	—	—	70	—	—	RIAA: Platinum; MC: Gold	Over It
"Come Thru" (with Usher)	2019	42	23	5	—	65	—	12	42	28	—	RIAA: 2× Platinum; ARIA: Platinum; BPI: Gold; MC: Platinum; RMNZ: Platinum	Over It
"Something Real" (with Chris Brown and London on da Track)	2019	— (Note: "Something Real" did not enter the Billboard Hot 100 chart, but peaked at number 20 on the Bubbling Under Hot 100 chart.)	— (Note: "Something Real" did not enter the Hot R&B/Hip-Hop Songs chart, but peaked at number 23 on the R&B/Hip-Hop Digital Song Sales chart.)	19	—	—	—	17	99	—	—	RIAA: Gold; RMNZ: Gold	Non-album single
"Love Cycle" (with Toosii)	2020	— (Note: "Love Cycle" did not enter the Billboard Hot 100 chart, but peaked at number seven on the Bubbling Under Hot 100 chart.)	44	—	—	—	—	—	—	—	—	RIAA: Platinum	Poetic Pain
"Bullshit" (with Young Rog)	2021	—	—	—	—	—	—	—	—	—	—		Boy Next Door
"Ex for a Reason" (with JT of City Girls)	2021	33	12	6	—	75	—	18	42	20	51	RIAA: Gold; RMNZ: Gold	Still Over It
"I Want to Come Home for Christmas"	2021	—	—	—	—	—	—	—	94	25	—		Non-album single
"No Love" (original with SZA or extended version also with Cardi B)	2022	13	5	2	—	37	—	5	24	5	17	RIAA: 2× Platinum; ARIA: Gold; BPI: Silver; MC: Gold; RMNZ: Platinum	Still Over It
"Good Good" (with Usher and 21 Savage)	2023	25	7	3	—	—	—	7	—	—	—	RMNZ: Gold	Coming Home
"Songs About U" (with Tink)	2024	—	— (Note: "Songs About U" did not enter the Billboard Hot R&B/Hip-Hop Songs chart, but peaked at number 15 on the Mainstream R&B/Hip-Hop Airplay chart.)	11	—	—	—	28	—	—	—		Winter's Diary 5
"Prove It" (with 21 Savage)	2024	43	19	—	—	41	—	19	—	—	65	RIAA: Platinum; BPI: Silver; MC: Gold; RMNZ: Platinum	American Dream
"Heart of a Woman"	2024	57	14	8	—	—	—	11	83	—	150	RIAA: Platinum; RMNZ: Gold	Finally Over It
"Spend It" (Note: "Spend It" was included on physical editions of Finally Over It.)	2025	—	30	12	—	—	—	32	—	—	—		Non-album single
"FMT"	2025	79	—	—	—	—	—	9	93	—	—		Finally Over It
"Go Girl" (with Latto and Doja Cat)	2026	60	11	7	—	—	—	—	—	—	—		Finally Over It
"—" denotes a recording that did not chart or was not released in that territory.

=== As featured artist ===
List of singles as lead artist, with selected chart positions, showing year released and album name
Title	Year	Peak chart positions							Certifications	Album
Title	Year	US	US R&B	US R&B/HH Air.	CAN	NZ Hot	UK	WW	Certifications	Album
"No Lames" (Kash Doll featuring Summer Walker)	2019	—	—	—	—	16	—	—		Stacked
"Secret" (21 Savage featuring Summer Walker)	2020	—	—	—	—	16	—	—	RIAA: Gold	Non-album singles
"Eleven" (Remix) (Khalid featuring Summer Walker)	2020	—	—	—	—	10	—	—		Non-album singles
"Mood Swings" (Remix) (Pop Smoke featuring Lil Tjay and Summer Walker)	2020	—	—	—	—	—	—	—		Mood Swings – EP
"Back Home" (Trey Songz featuring Summer Walker)	2020	—	8	12	—	22	—	—		Back Home
"Ready" (Fredo featuring Summer Walker)	2021	—	—	—	—	—	21	—	BPI: Silver	Money Can't Buy Happiness
"You Will Be Found" (Sam Smith featuring Summer Walker)	2021	—	—	—	—	—	—	—		Dear Evan Hansen: Original Motion Picture Soundtrack
"Better Thangs" (Ciara featuring Summer Walker)	2022	—	—	35	—	—	—	—		Non-album single
"Hell n Back" (Remix) (Bakar featuring Summer Walker)	2023	53	—	—	47	—	—	54		Halo
"Your Friends" (Remix) (Hunxho featuring Summer Walker)	2024	—	—	—	—	—	—	—		Non-album single
"You're Stuck" (Odeal featuring Summer Walker)	2024	—	—	—	—	—	—	—		Lustropolis
"Pookie's Requiem" (Sailorr featuring Summer Walker)	2025	—	—	—	—	24	—	—		From Florida's Finest: Delu/xxx For My Delusional Ex
"Slick" (Remix) (Victony featuring Don Toliver and Summer Walker)	2026	—	—	—	—	—	—	—		Non-album single
"Face Card" (Remix) (Skilla Baby featuring Bryson Tiller, Chris Brown and Summer Walker)	2026	—	—	—	—	—	—	—		Non-album single
"—" denotes a recording that did not chart or was not released in that territory.

=== Promotional singles ===
List of promotional singles, showing year released and album name
Title	Year	Album
"Queen Space" (with Ari Lennox)	2022	Away Message and Age/Sex/Location

== Other charted and certified songs ==
List of other charted and certified songs, with selected chart positions
Title	Year	Peak chart positions							Certifications	Album
Title	Year	US	US R&B /HH	US R&B	CAN	NZ Hot	UK	WW	Certifications	Album
"Deep"	2018	—	—	—	—	—	—	—	RIAA: Platinum; ARIA: Gold; BPI: Silver; RMNZ: Platinum	Last Day of Summer
"Baby"	2018	—	—	—	—	—	—	—	RIAA: Gold	Last Day of Summer
"Karma"	2018	— (Note: "Karma" did not enter the Billboard Hot 100 chart, but peaked at number five on the Bubbling Under Hot 100 chart.)	31	—	—	—	—	—	RIAA: 2× Platinum; ARIA: Gold; BPI: Silver; RMNZ: Gold	Last Day of Summer
"Riot"	2019	—	—	23	—	—	—	—	RIAA: Gold	Clear
"Summer Reign" (Rick Ross featuring Summer Walker)	2019	— (Note: "Summer Reign" did not enter the Billboard Hot 100, but peaked at number six on the Bubbling Under Hot 100 chart.)	—	—	—	—	—	—		Port of Miami 2
"Over It"	2019	80	40	11	—	—	—	—	RIAA: Gold	Over It
"Body"	2019	73	36	9	—	35	—	—	RIAA: 3× Platinum; ARIA: Gold; BPI: Silver; MC: Gold; RMNZ: Platinum	Over It
"Drunk Dialing...LODT"	2019	79	39	10	—	—	—	—	RIAA: Platinum	Over It
"Potential"	2019	92	46	13	—	—	—	—	RIAA: Platinum	Over It
"Fun Girl"	2019	— (Note: "Fun Girl" did not enter the Billboard Hot 100, but peaked at number three on the Bubbling Under Hot 100 chart.)	— (Note: "Fun Girl" did not enter the Hot R&B/Hip-Hop Songs chart, but peaked at number three on the Bubbling Under R&B/Hip-Hop Singles chart.)	18	—	—	—	—	RIAA: Gold	Over It
"Tonight"	2019	— (Note: "Tonight" did not enter the Billboard Hot 100, but peaked at number two on the Bubbling Under Hot 100 chart.)	— (Note: "Tonight" did not enter the Hot R&B/Hip-Hop Songs chart, but peaked at number two on the Bubbling Under R&B/Hip-Hop Singles chart.)	17	—	—	—	—	RIAA: Platinum; BPI: Silver; RMNZ: Gold	Over It
"Me"	2019	— (Note: "Me" did not enter the Billboard Hot 100, but peaked at number 11 on the Bubbling Under Hot 100 chart.)	— (Note: "Me" did not enter the Hot R&B/Hip-Hop Songs chart, but peaked at number seven on the Bubbling Under R&B/Hip-Hop Singles chart.)	23	—	—	—	—	RIAA: Gold	Over It
"Like It" (with 6lack)	2019	— (Note: "Like It" did not enter the Billboard Hot 100, but peaked at number four on the Bubbling Under Hot 100 chart.)	— (Note: "Like It" did not enter the Hot R&B/Hip-Hop Songs chart, but peaked at number four on the Bubbling Under R&B/Hip-Hop Singles chart.)	19	—	—	—	—	RIAA: Gold	Over It
"Just Might" (featuring PartyNextDoor)	2019	— (Note: "Just Might" did not enter the Billboard Hot 100, but peaked at number one on the Bubbling Under Hot 100 chart.)	— (Note: "Just Might" did not enter the Hot R&B/Hip-Hop Songs chart, but peaked at number one on the Bubbling Under R&B/Hip-Hop Singles chart.)	16	—	—	—	—	RIAA: Platinum; BPI: Silver; RMNZ: Gold	Over It
"Off of You"	2019	— (Note: "Off of You" did not enter the Billboard Hot 100, but peaked at number six on the Bubbling Under Hot 100 chart.)	— (Note: "Off of You" did not enter the Hot R&B/Hip-Hop Songs chart, but peaked at number eight on the Bubbling Under R&B/Hip-Hop Singles chart.)	—	—	—	—	—	RIAA: Gold	Over It
"Anna Mae"	2019	— (Note: "Anna Mae" did not enter the Billboard Hot 100, but peaked at number 18 on the Bubbling Under Hot 100 chart.)	— (Note: "Anna Mae" did not enter the Hot R&B/Hip-Hop Songs chart, but peaked at number ten on the Bubbling Under R&B/Hip-Hop Singles chart.)	—	—	—	—	—	RIAA: Gold	Over It
"I'll Kill You" (featuring Jhené Aiko)	2019	61	29	7	—	27	—	—	RIAA: 2× Platinum; ARIA: Gold; BPI: Silver; MC: Gold; RMNZ: Gold	Over It
"Nobody Else"	2019	— (Note: "Nobody Else" did not enter the Billboard Hot 100, but peaked at number 10 on the Bubbling Under Hot 100 chart.)	— (Note: "Nobody Else" did not enter the Hot R&B/Hip-Hop Songs chart, but peaked at number six on the Bubbling Under R&B/Hip-Hop Singles chart.)	22	—	—	—	—	RIAA: Gold	Over It
"Let It Go"	2020	84	44	5	—	36	88	—	RIAA: Gold	Life on Earth
"SWV" (with No1-Noah)	2020	— (Note: "SWV" did not enter the Billboard Hot 100, but peaked at number one on the Bubbling Under Hot 100 chart.)	—	8	—	—	—	—		Life on Earth
"My Affection" (with PartyNextDoor)	2020	86	45	6	—	17	77	—	RIAA: Platinum	Life on Earth
"White Tee" (with No1-Noah)	2020	— (Note: "White Tee" did not enter the Billboard Hot 100, but peaked at number three on the Bubbling Under Hot 100 chart.)	—	9	—	—	—	—	RIAA: Platinum; ARIA: Gold; BPI: Silver; RMNZ: Gold	Life on Earth
"Deeper"	2020	— (Note: "Deeper" did not enter the Billboard Hot 100, but peaked at number eight on the Bubbling Under Hot 100 chart.)	—	10	—	—	—	—		Life on Earth
"Bitter" (with Cardi B)	2021	25	9	5	76	20	48	36	RIAA: Gold	Still Over It
"Throw It Away"	2021	41	14	7	82	26	—	48	RIAA: Gold	Still Over It
"Reciprocate"	2021	44	15	8	93	—	—	54	RIAA: Gold	Still Over It
"You Don't Know Me"	2021	50	19	12	—	—	—	68		Still Over It
"Circus"	2021	54	22	15	—	—	—	87		Still Over It
"Insane"	2021	52	20	13	—	—	—	75	RIAA: Gold	Still Over It
"Constant Bullshit"	2021	49	18	11	—	—	—	69	RIAA: Gold	Still Over It
"Switch a Nigga Out"	2021	59	27	19	—	—	—	92		Still Over It
"Unloyal" (with Ari Lennox)	2021	48	17	10	—	—	—	59	RIAA: Gold	Still Over It
"Closure"	2021	60	28	20	—	—	—	95		Still Over It
"Toxic" (featuring Lil Durk)	2021	45	16	9	—	—	—	58	RIAA: Gold	Still Over It
"Dat Right There" (with Pharrell Williams)	2021	77	36	24	—	—	—	144		Still Over It
"Screwin" (with Omarion)	2021	73	33	22	—	—	—	150		Still Over It
"Broken Promises"	2021	50	35	23	—	—	—	156		Still Over It
"Session 33"	2021	68	32	21	—	—	—	123		Still Over It
"4th Baby Mama (Prelude)"	2021	— (Note: "4th Baby Mama (Prelude)" did not enter the Billboard Hot 100 chart, but peaked at number five on the Bubbling Under Hot 100 chart.)	—	—	—	—	—	—		Still Over It
"4th Baby Mama"	2021	56	24	17	94	—	—	94	RIAA: Gold	Still Over It
"Ciara's Prayer" (with Ciara)	2021	— (Note: "Ciara's Prayer" did not enter the Billboard Hot 100 chart, but peaked at number one on the Bubbling Under Hot 100 chart.)	49	—	—	—	—	—		Still Over It
"Difference Is" (Lil Durk featuring Summer Walker)	2022	73	27	—	—	—	—	—	RIAA: Gold	7220
"Purple Hearts" (with Kendrick Lamar and Ghostface Killah)	2022	22	14	—	27	—	—	24		Mr. Morale & the Big Steppers
"To Summer, from Cole (Audio Hug)" (with J. Cole)	2023	63	17	—	—	8	—	—	RIAA: Gold; RMNZ: Gold	Clear 2: Soft Life
"Hardlife"	2023	—	44	16	—	—	—	—		Clear 2: Soft Life
"How Does It Feel"	2023	—	—	20	—	—	—	—		Clear 2: Soft Life
"Mind Yo Mouth"	2023	—	—	22	—	—	—	—		Clear 2: Soft Life
"Pull Up"	2023	—	—	21	—	—	—	—		Clear 2: Soft Life
"New Type" (featuring Childish Gambino)	2023	— (Note: "New Type" did not enter the Billboard Hot 100 chart, but peaked at number 24 on the Bubbling Under Hot 100 chart.)	41	14	—	40	—	—		Clear 2: Soft Life
"Finding Peace"	2023	—	—	25	—	—	—	—		Clear 2: Soft Life
"Stressed" (Lil Tjay featuring Summer Walker)	2023	—	—	—	—	21	—	—		222
"Stay Long" (with Diddy)	2023	—	—	13	—	—	—	—		The Love Album: Off the Grid
"Dead" (Cardi B featuring Summer Walker)	2025	47	12	—	—	19	—	—		Am I the Drama?
"Shower Tears" (Cardi B featuring Summer Walker)	2025	81	22	—	—	—	—	—		Am I the Drama?
"Scars"	2025	— (Note: "Scars" did not enter the Billboard Hot 100 chart, but peaked at number 4 on the Bubbling Under Hot 100 chart.)	26	13	—	—	—	—		Finally Over It
"Robbed You" (with Mariah the Scientist)	2025	58	10	7	—	16	—	—		Finally Over It
"No"	2025	69	16	10	—	22	—	—		Finally Over It
"Baby" (with Chris Brown)	2025	68	15	9	—	11	—	—		Finally Over It
"1-800-Heartbreak" (with Anderson .Paak)	2025	80	19	11	—	—	—	—		Finally Over It
"Situationship"	2025	— (Note: "Situationship" did not enter the Billboard Hot 100 chart, but peaked at number 8 on the Bubbling Under Hot 100 chart.)	29	16	—	—	—	—		Finally Over It
"Give Me a Reason" (with Bryson Tiller)	2025	— (Note: "Give Me a Reason" did not enter the Billboard Hot 100 chart, but peaked at number 2 on the Bubbling Under Hot 100 chart.)	25	12	—	—	—	—		Finally Over It
"How Sway" (with Sailorr)	2025	— (Note: "How Sway" did not enter the Billboard Hot 100 chart, but peaked at number 10 on the Bubbling Under Hot 100 chart.)	33	17	—	—	—	—		Finally Over It
"Baller" (with GloRilla, Sexyy Red and Monaleo)	2025	96	23	—	—	—	—	—		Finally Over It
"Don't Make Me Do It/Tempted"	2025	— (Note: "Don't Make Me Do It/Tempted" did not enter the Billboard Hot 100 chart, but peaked at number 11 on the Bubbling Under Hot 100 chart.)	34	18	—	—	—	—		Finally Over It
"Get Yo Boy" (with 21 Savage)	2025	— (Note: "Get Yo Boy" did not enter the Billboard Hot 100 chart, but peaked at number 5 on the Bubbling Under Hot 100 chart.)	27	14	—	—	—	—		Finally Over It
"Number One" (with Brent Faiyaz)	2025	— (Note: "Number One" did not enter the Billboard Hot 100 chart, but peaked at number 13 on the Bubbling Under Hot 100 chart.)	35	19	—	—	—	—		Finally Over It
"Stitch Me Up"	2025	— (Note: "Stitch Me Up" did not enter the Billboard Hot 100 chart, but peaked at number 16 on the Bubbling Under Hot 100 chart.)	37	20	—	—	—	—		Finally Over It
"Allegedly" (featuring Teddy Swims)	2025	— (Note: "Allegedly" did not enter the Billboard Hot 100 chart, but peaked at number 17 on the Bubbling Under Hot 100 chart.)	40	22	—	—	—	—		Finally Over It
"Finally Over It"	2025	— (Note: "Finally Over It" did not enter the Billboard Hot 100 chart, but peaked at number 6 on the Bubbling Under Hot 100 chart.)	28	15	—	—	—	—		Finally Over It
"—" denotes a recording that did not chart or was not released in that territory.

== Guest appearances ==
List of guest appearances, with other artists
Title	Year	Other artist(s)	Album
"Summer Reign"	2019	Rick Ross	Port of Miami 2
"Superstar"	2019	Jacquees	King of R&B
"D&G"	2019	Davido	A Good Time
"Triggered" (remix)	2019	Jhené Aiko, 21 Savage	—N/a
"Real Luv"	2020	Moneybagg Yo	Time Served
"I'm Gonna Love You Just a Little More Baby"	2020	—N/a	Birds of Prey: The Album
"Calm Down (Bittersweet)"	2020	A Boogie wit da Hoodie	Artist 2.0
"Falling" (remix)	2020	Trevor Daniel	—N/a
"Yummy" (remix)	2020	Justin Bieber	Changes
"'Flawless' Do It Well, Pt. 3"	2020	dvsn	A Muse in Her Feelings
"Easy"	2020	Aminé	Limbo
"All Pride Aside"	2021	Shelley FKA DRAM	Shelley FKA DRAM
"Difference Is"	2022	Lil Durk	7220
"Purple Hearts"	2022	Kendrick Lamar, Ghostface Killah	Mr. Morale & the Big Steppers
"Queen Space"	2022	Ari Lennox	Away Message and Age/Sex/Location
"Stressed"	2023	Lil Tjay	222
"Stay Long"	2023	Diddy	The Love Album: Off the Grid
"I Might"	2023	Sexyy Red	Hood Hottest Princess (Deluxe)
"Deserve Me"	2023	Kali Uchis	Red Moon in Venus
"Dead"	2025	Cardi B	Am I the Drama?
"Shower Tears"	2025	Cardi B	Am I the Drama?
"Last night at ATL"	2026	Gucci Mane	Against All Odds
"Bonnet"	2026	Belly Gang Kushington, Wale	Good Dope Sell Itself
"Face Card (Remix)"	2026	Skilla Baby, Chris Brown, Bryson Tiller	The Price of Fame
