= Heart of a Woman (song) =

2024 single by Summer Walker

Single by Summer Walker

from the album Finally Over It
- Released: October 25, 2024
- Genre: R&B
- Length: 2:51
- Label: LVRN; Interscope
- Songwriters: Summer Walker; David Bishop
- Producer: Tavaras Jordan

Summer Walker singles chronology
"Prove It" (2024)	"Heart of a Woman" (2024)	"You're Stuck" (2024)

Music video
- "Heart of a Woman" on YouTube

"Heart of a Woman" is a song by American singer Summer Walker, released on October 25, 2024, as the lead single from her third studio album, Finally Over It. It was written by Walker and David "Dos Dias" Bishop and produced by Tavaras Jordan.

"Heart of a Woman" was nominated at the 68th Annual Grammy Awards for Best R&B Performance and Best R&B Song.

== Background ==
Summer Walker first previewed the track in August 2024 in a since-deleted Instagram post featuring a snippet of the song. On October 11, 2024, Summer Walker announced the single in promotion of Finally Over It, with a teaser video in which the song plays in the background.

== Composition ==
"Heart of a Woman" is an R&B ballad that depicts Summer Walker's conflicted feelings of thinking of leaving a toxic relationship but choosing to stay with her partner and endure his ill-treatment because her deep love for him. She warns him that the "only thing that's saving you is the heart of a woman". The song has been considered reminiscent of 1990s R&B and incorporates elements of the neo soul approach from her EP Clear 2: Soft Life.

== Critical reception ==
Zachary Horvath of HotNewHipHop gave a positive review, writing "It's a painful but beautiful listen, as her vocals gingerly glide over the lowkey instrumental."

== Music video ==
An official lyric video was released alongside the single. It stars Serena Page and Kordell Beckham, the winners of season 6 of the reality show Love Island. The clip sees them constantly arguing, with Beckham always ranting at Page, who always endures his behavior and forgives him. At the end of the video, she has become more confident and leaves a key on a table. The official music video was released on December 23, 2024.

== Charts ==
=== Weekly charts ===
Weekly chart performance for "Heart of a Woman"
Chart (2024–2025)	Peak position
Netherlands (Single Tip)	15
New Zealand Hot Singles (RMNZ)	11
UK Singles (Official Charts)	83
US Billboard Hot 100	57
US Hot R&B/Hip-Hop Songs (Billboard)	14
US Rhythmic Airplay (Billboard)	20

=== Year-end charts ===
Year-end chart performance for "Heart of a Woman"
Chart (2025)	Position
US Billboard Hot 100	94
US Hot R&B/Hip-Hop Songs (Billboard)	20
US R&B/Hip-Hop Airplay (Billboard)	5

== Certifications ==
Certifications for "Heart of a Woman"
Region	Certification	Certified units/sales
Brazil (Pro-Música Brasil)	Gold	20,000^{‡}
New Zealand (RMNZ)	Gold	15,000^{‡}
United States (RIAA)	Platinum	1,000,000^{‡}
^{‡} Sales+streaming figures based on certification alone.

== Release history ==
Release history for "Heart of a Woman"
Region	Date	Format	Label	Ref.
Various	October 25, 2024	Digital download; streaming	LVRN; Interscope	
United States	18 February 2025	Rhythmic crossover	Interscope	
