= Finally Over It =

- Standard cover

Studio album by Summer Walker
- Released: November 14, 2025
- Genre: R&B
- Length: 55:18
- Labels: LVRN; Interscope
- Producers: 1stfrom92; 300it; A. Archer; Mike Baretz; Chris Beach; Ben10k; Ryan Buendia; Nija Charles; Ant Clemons; Bryan-Michael Cox; Rami Dawod; Anoop D'Souza; Fallen; Jeremih Felton; Montell Fish; Flippa; Fresh Ayr; Dave Hamelin; Hossy; Ibmixing; J2M; Jean Baptiste; Tavaras Jordan; Kavi; Adam Krevlin; Lil Yachty; Lou Xtwo; Terrace Martin; Mikaili; Nineteen85; Ojikae; Ryan Press; Karl Rubin; Sadpony; Slimwav; Spiff Sinatra; Troy Taylor U the Goat; The-Dream; Zach Ezzy; Zach & Roger

Summer Walker chronology
Still Over It (2021)	Finally Over It (2025)

Singles from Finally Over It
- 1. "Heart of a Woman" Released: October 25, 2024; 2. "FMT" Released: November 14, 2025; 3. "Go Girl" Released: March 10, 2026

Finally Over It is the third studio album by American singer and songwriter Summer Walker. It was released through Love Renaissance (LVRN) and Interscope on November 14, 2025. The album marks the third and final installment of its series, called Over It, with Over It (2019) and Still Over It (2021). The album features guest appearances from Mariah the Scientist, Latto, Doja Cat, Chris Brown, Anderson .Paak, Bryson Tiller, Sailorr, GloRilla, Sexyy Red, Monaleo, 21 Savage, Brent Faiyaz, Teddy Swims and Foggieraw. The lead single "Heart of a Woman" was released on October 25, 2024.

Finally Over It debuted at number 2 on the US Billboard 200, becoming her third consecutive album to debut within the top two of the chart. Upon its release, the album received generally positive reviews. Critics praised Walker's emotional maturity, introspective lyricism, and polished transition into a more classic '90s/early-2000s R&B sound, though some noted that the album felt overly long and criticized a lack of rawness compared to her earlier work.

== Background and recording ==
Following the release of her second studio album, Still Over It, on November 5, 2021, the singer would collaborate with a number of different artists in the next two years, including Usher, Ari Lennox and Ciara, amongst others. In May 2023, Walker released her EP titled Clear 2: Soft Life. Over a year later, on July 7, 2024, it was reported that the singer was working on her third studio album when she shared photos of herself in the recording studio alongside a potential tracklist of 19 songs.

On October 4, 2024, the fifth anniversary of the release of her debut studio album, Over It, Walker confirmed that there was a third part of the Over It series by sharing an azure-colored Spotify canvas depicting the three album titles with the third being partly blanked as well as an interactive title generator. A week later, on October 11, Walker announced the title of the album as well as the release of the lead single "Heart of a Woman" alongside the news. An accompanying teaser video shows Walker in her bedroom dressed in a night robe listening to voicemails, including one of a man that begs to talk to her. The voicemail in question was inspired by a message from her ex-boyfriend Lil Meech after their split-up in 2023.

== Concept ==
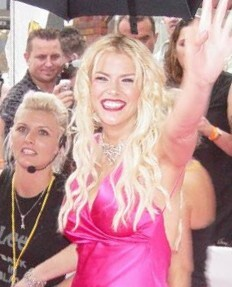
Walker's album and artwork draws inspiration from American model Anna Nicole Smith, who married then 89-year old businessman J. Howard Marshall in 1994.

Finally Over It is the third and final installment in Walker's trilogy, following her first two albums Over It (2019) and Still Over It (2021). In May 2024, on her Instagram live, Walker described the album as a journey to self-love, happiness, and femininity, and described it as a shift from the introspective concepts surrounding heartbreak and toxic relationships on her previous projects. Prior to the album's announcement, Walker revealed the 18-track album is split in two parts: For Better and For Worse.

"For Better is about choosing me, fully and finally," Walker described on her Instagram account. "I've made choices that didn't always make sense to anyone else, but I don't regret any of them. They all taught me something." Walker also described For Worse as her giving up on unconditional love. "For Worse isn't bitter, but honest. I've loved too hard, ignored red flags, and tried to fix things that were beyond repair. The difference now is I love myself that deeply, I've grown, I've healed, and I refuse to accept anything less than princess treatment."

=== Cover artworks and aesthetics ===
Walker revealed a variety of album covers solely for vinyl on her official website before revealing the official album cover on November 5. The official artwork across all platforms and physical releases depicts Walker in a wedding dress and an older man in a wheelchair, presumably a billionaire, with white rose petals falling above them. The artwork draws inspiration from photos of model Anna Nicole Smith's publicized wedding to businessman J. Howard Marshall II in 1994.

In a YouTube Q&A describing each track of the album, Walker revealed the album's overall aesthetic and concept takes inspiration from Smith, Pamela Anderson, who inspired her wardrobe and album marketing strategy at the 2025 MTV Video Music Awards, and Playboy models.

== Release and promotion ==
During the week of the sixth anniversary of Over It, Walker blurred the artworks of her debut album and Still Over It across all streaming platforms, teasing Finally Over It. On October 10, Walker shared an infomercial inspired video on Instagram releasing a "Finally Over It" compensation hotline for her fans eager for the album. The hotline's voicemail included a brief message from Walker teasing the official release date and a teaser of a track on the album. On October 15, Walker premiered a YouTube video revealing the album's official release date while taking a polygraph test, answering questions about the album, its potential collaborators, love, relationships, and more. At the end of the video, she announced the album would be available for pre-order.

The album was released on November 14, 2025, available in both digital and physical formats, including box sets and three online-exclusive vinyl variants with different artworks. Walker announced, through Spotify, that the album would be 18 tracks and split into two parts: For Better and For Worse.

On October 31, Walker released a promotional video inspired by horror film Scream (1996) and its parody film Scary Movie (2000), announcing a "Finally Over It Escape Room" event in Atlanta, Georgia on November 8. On the same day, Walker furthered the album's promotion with a pop-up dump truck service and meet-and-greet event at Morehouse College, and open to all students at Spelman College and Clark Atlanta University. The dump truck service encouraged fans to get rid of their former lovers' items, throwing it into the dump truck.

On November 10, Walker announced the album's collaborators in a 2-minute wedding-themed skit with Spotify, with artists mentioned such as GloRilla, Chris Brown, Latto, Bryson Tiller, Sexyy Red, and more. Walker released a Pac-Man inspired video game on her official website to further promote the album. On November 13, Walker appeared as a guest on The Jennifer Hudson Show to discuss Finally Over It and her commercial success.

== Critical reception ==
Professional ratings
Aggregate scores
Source	Rating
Metacritic	75/100
Review scores
Source	Rating
AllMusic	4/5 stars
Clash	7/10
NME	4/5 stars
Pitchfork	6.0/10
Rolling Stone	3.5/5 stars

Finally Over It received generally positive reviews from music critics. According to the review aggregator Metacritic, Finally Over It received "generally favorable reviews" based on a weighted average score of 75 out of 100 from 6 critic scores.

Shahzaib Hussain of Clash gave a 7 out of 10 rating for the album and wrote, "Finally Over It is a cumulative rendering, moving between the softness and scorn that characterised Walker's first two efforts. It's framed as a resolution, a clean break. But just as all that's preceded it, we're betting on Summer Walker, in a year or two, to offer up another raw parable on love as the ultimate intoxicant. For better or worse." NME's Kyann-Sian Williams gave the album four stars rating out of five and wrote, "Love has never been easy for Walker: every breakup has been a public spectacle plastered across social media, so she's been forced to break and rebuild repeatedly under a microscope in front of the world. But now, she's found her autonomy."

Pitchfork's Rawiya Kameir gave a more mixed review and wrote, "No amount of emotional clarity can substitute for the barbed specificity and desperate rhythmic phrasing of Walker's strongest writing, largely abandoned on Finally Over It in the name of self-restraint. Instead, she disappears, along with guests Anderson .Paak and Bryson Tiller, into a tedious stretch that brings to mind a certain subgenre of YouTube tutorial: How to Make a '90s Slow Jam Type Beat in FL Studio."

== Commercial performance ==
Finally Over It debuted at number 2 on the Billboard 200 with over 77,000 album-equivalent units. Of that total, approximately 69,000 units came from streaming (about 92 million on-demand streams), and 8,000 units were pure album sales. This marked the biggest R&B debut by a female artist in 2025.

In the United Kingdom, the album reached number 13 on the Official Charts Company. On the ARIA Albums Chart in Australia, it peaked at number 19.

== Track listing ==
Disc 1 – For Better
No.	Title	Writer(s)	Producer(s)	Length
1.	"Scars"	Summer Walker; David Bishop; Rami Dawod; Matthew Cicero; Max Theodore	Dos Dias^{[p]}; Dawod; Ojikae; Theodore^{[a]}	0:51
2.	"Robbed You" (with Mariah the Scientist)	Walker; Mariah Buckles; Nija Charles; Bishop; Anthony Jefferies; Dawod; Arsenio Archer; Curtis Jackson; David Brown; Rondell Turner; Tre'Von Waters	Dos Dias; Nineteen85; Dawod; A. Archer	3:18
3.	"No"	Walker; Waters; Jabreh Shaw; Terrace Martin; Troy Taylor; Jerome Monroe Jr.; Bishop; Tim Maxey; Beyoncé Knowles; Shawn Carter; Bernard Edwards Jr.	T. Martin; Troy Taylor U the Goat; Slimwav; Dos Dias^{[a]}^{[v]}; Maxey^{[a]}	2:26
4.	"Go Girl" (with Latto and Doja Cat)	Walker; Alyssa Stephens; Amala Dlamini; Bishop; Jefferies; T. Martin; Ronald Colson; Zachary Seman; Roger Kleinman; Glenn Bolton; Shahid Wright; Leonardo Roman; Paul Huston; Martin Nemley; Arnold Hamilton; Christopher Smith; Jeremy Felton; Sonyae Elise	Dos Dias; Nineteen85; T. Martin; Flippa; Zach & Roger; Kleinman	3:48
5.	"Baby" (with Chris Brown)	Walker; Christopher Brown; Ant Clemons; Elliott Trent; Genia Simone; Jean-Baptiste Kouame; Ryan Buendia; Karl Rubin; Ryan Press; Bishop; Mariah Carey; Jermaine Dupri; Manuel Seal	Jean Baptiste; Buendia; Rubin; Press; Dos Dias^{[a]}	2:28
6.	"1-800-Heartbreak" (with Anderson .Paak)	Walker; Brandon Anderson; Bryan-Michael Cox; Bishop; Sterling White Jr.; Isaiah Brown; James Owens	Cox; Dos Dias; Spiff Sinatra; Ibmixing; J2M	5:24
7.	"Heart of a Woman"	Walker; Bishop	Tavaras Jordan	2:51
8.	"Situationship"	Walker; Montell Frazier; Bishop; Cicero	Montell Fish; Dos Dias^{[p]}; Ojikae	2:20
9.	"Give Me a Reason" (with Bryson Tiller)	Walker; Bryson Tiller; Fashxn; Jefferies; Felton; James Ho	Nineteen85; Felton; Malay^{[a]}	2:48

Disc 2 – For Worse
No.	Title	Writer(s)	Producer(s)	Length
10.	"FMT"	Walker; Lee Stashenko; Stavros Tsarouhas	Fallen; Tsarouhas^{[a]}; T. Martin^{[a]}	3:28
11.	"How Sway" (with Sailorr)	Walker; Sailorr; Zachary Ezickson; Adam Krevlin; Anoop D'Souza	Zach Ezzy; Krevlin; D'Souza	2:13
12.	"Baller" (with GloRilla, Sexyy Red, and Monaleo)	Walker; Gloria Woods; Janae Wherry; Leondra Gay; Gabrielle Rodgers; Jeffries; Miles McCollum; Bishop; Jeremiah Raisen; Kavian Salehi; Benjamin Wilson; Mike Baretz; James Mtume; Reggie Lucas	Nineteen85; Lil Yachty; Dos Dias; Sadpony; Kavi; Ben10k; Baretz	3:24
13.	"Don't Make Me Do It/Tempted"	Walker; Clemons; Monroe; Kouame; Buendia; Rubin; Press	Slimwav; Jean Baptiste; Buendia; Rubin; Press; Dos Dias^{[a]}^{[v]}	4:56
14.	"Get Yo Boy" (with 21 Savage)	Walker; Shéyaa Bin Abraham-Joseph; Jefferies; T. Martin; Bishop; Archer; Harold Payne; Peter Luboff; James Eubanks	Nineteen85; T. Martin; Dos Dias; A. Archer	3:09
15.	"Number One" (with Brent Faiyaz)	Walker; Christopher Wood; Elliot Davy; Mikaili Ector; Chris Beach; David Patino; Chidozie Arah; Anthony Rampias	1stfrom92; Mikaili; Beach; Dpat^{[a]}; Spizzledoe^{[a]}; AR^{[a]}	2:47
16.	"Stitch Me Up"	Walker; Jeffery Robinson; Kristian Hossy; Lasse Qvist; Bishop; Daystar Peterson	Fresh Ayr; Hossy; Lou Xtwo; Dos Dias^{[a]}^{[v]}	3:04
17.	"Allegedly" (with Teddy Swims)	Walker; Jaten Dimsdale; Terius Gesteelde-Diamant; Dave Hamelin	The-Dream; Hamelin; Kuk Harrell^{[v]}	3:36
18.	"Finally Over It"	Walker; Rodgers; Dawod; Christopher Martin; Theodore	Dawod; 300it; Theodore^{[a]}; T. Martin^{[a]}	2:23
Total length:				55:18

The Afterparty deluxe edition additional tracks
No.	Title	Writer(s)	Producer(s)	Length
19.	"Take Me Out This Club"	Walker; Jocelyn Donald; Uforo Ebong; Ernest Osei-Bonsu	BongoByTheWay; Bonxu; Dos Dias; Jaycen Joshua	2:45
20.	"1-800 Heartbreak" (solo version)	Walker; Anderson; Cox; Bishop; White; Brown; Owens	Cox; Dos Dias; Spiff Sinatra; Ibmixing; J2M	3:35
21.	"Drown in My Love" (featuring Foggieraw)	Walker; Joseph Davinci; Bishop; Jesse Owusu; Luke Johansson; Lee Morris; Bernie Wayne	Yogic; Davinci; Dos Dias; Joe Visciano; Joe LaPorta	4:34
Total length:				66:12

Finally Over It – Cocktail Hour deluxe edition additional tracks
No.	Title	Length
19.	"Session 34 (Mona Lisa)"
20.	"Session 32" (Live from Vegas)
21.	"Session 33"	2:07
22.	"Session 32"	1:38
23.	"Sessions Explained"
24.	"Go Girl" ((behind-the-scenes) (with Latto and Doja Cat)
25.	"Heart of a Woman" (music video)

Finally Over It – Physical edition additional tracks
No.	Title	Writer(s)	Producer(s)	Length
13.	"Don't Stop/Tempted"	Walker; Clemons; Monroe; Kouame; Buendia; Rubin; Press	Slimwav; Jean Baptiste; Buendia; Rubin; Press; Dos Dias	3:32
16.	"Spend It"	Walker	Rami Dawood; Dos Dias; Slimwav	2:45

=== Notes ===
- ^{^[p]} indicates a primary and vocal producer.
- ^{^[a]} indicates an additional producer.
- ^{^[v]} indicates a vocal producer.
- "Spend It" and "Don't Stop/Tempted" are only included on physical versions of the album.
- "Go Girl" does not include Doja Cat on physical releases.
- "Baller" does not include Monaleo on physical releases.
- "Stitch Me Up", "Baby", "Don't Make Me Do It/Tempted" and "Allegedly" are not available on physical releases.
- "Give Me a Reason" does not include Bryson Tiller on physical releases.
- The Afterparty deluxe edition includes physical tracks "Drown in My Love" and "Take Me Out This Club", but does not include "Spend It".

=== Sample credits ===
- "Robbed You" samples "I'll Whip Ya Head Boy", written by Curtis Jackson, David Darnell Brown and Rondell Edwin Turner, as performed by 50 Cent.
- "No" samples "Yes", written by Beyoncé Knowles, Bernard Edwards Jr. and Shawn Carter, as performed by Beyoncé.
- "Baby" samples "Always Be My Baby", written by Jermaine Dupri, Mariah Carey and Manuel Seal, and performed by Mariah Carey.
- "Situationship" samples "Destroy Myself Just For You", written by Montell Frazier, and performed by Montell Fish.
- "Baller" samples "The Closer I Get to You", written by Reggie Lucas and James Mtume, and performed by Roberta Flack and Donny Hathaway.
- "Don't Make Me Do It/Tempted" contains an uncredited sample of "Get It Together", written by Donell Jones and performed by 702; and an uncredited interpolation of "Real Talk", written and performed by R. Kelly.
- "Get Yo Boy" contains a sample of "I Wish He Didn't Trust Me So Much", written by Pete Luboff, and James Eubanks, and performed by Bobby Womack.

== Personnel ==
Credits adapted from Tidal.

=== Musicians ===
- Summer Walker – vocals
- Dos Dias – additional vocals (tracks 1, 8, 9, 13, 16)
- Max Theodore – strings (1, 18)
- Stockholm Studio Orchestra – strings (2)
- Mariah the Scientist – vocals (2)
- Latto – vocals (4)
- Doja Cat – vocals (4)
- Chris Brown – vocals (5)
- Larry "Laj" Smith II – saxophone (6)
- Jared "JB" Brown – trombone (6)
- Spiff Sinatra – trumpet (6)
- Anderson .Paak – vocals (6)
- Montell Fish – additional vocals (8)
- Bryson Tiller – vocals (9)
- Jah Whittingham – guitar (10)
- Trevor Lawrence Jr. – shaker (10)
- Johnny May – strings (10)
- Stavros Tsarouhas – strings (10)
- Sailorr – vocals (11)
- GloRilla – vocals (12)
- Sexyy Red – vocals (12)
- Monaleo – vocals (12)
- 21 Savage – vocals (14)
- Brent Faiyaz – vocals (15)
- Dave Hamelin – drums, guitar, percussion, synthesizer (17)
- Patrick Krief – guitar (17)
- Tomi Martin – guitar (17)
- Lily Honigberg – strings (17)
- Marza Wilks – strings (17)
- Yasmeen Al-Mazeedi – strings (17)
- Johan Lenox – strings conductor (17)
- Teddy Swims – vocals (17)
- Stixx – drums (18)

=== Technical ===
- Dos Dias – engineering
- Max Stephens – engineering (1)
- Natalie D'Orlando – engineering (2)
- Jenso "JP" Plymouth – engineering (5)
- Jhair "Jha" Lazo – engineering (6)
- Thank Aaron – engineering (12)
- Sunny – engineering (12)
- Ibmixing – engineering (14)
- Itai Schwartz – engineering (15)
- Brandon Harding – engineering (17)
- Fermin Suero Jr. – engineering (17)
- Kuk Harrell – engineering (17)
- Joe Visciano – mixing (1, 4, 7, 8, 11, 12, 15, 18)
- Jaycen Joshua – mixing (2, 3, 5, 6, 9, 10, 13, 14, 16, 17), immersive mixing (1–6, 8–18)
- Alan JS Han – immersive mixing (7)
- Matt Boerum – immersive mixing (7)
- Colin Leonard – mastering
- Studio Bae – additional engineering (1)
- Jeremiah "Jeir" Snow – additional engineering (3)
- Synematik – additional engineering (10)
- Emiliano Olocco – additional mixing (5)
- Teezio – additional mixing (5)
- Dillon Brophy – additional mixing (12)
- Jess Jackson – additional mixing (12)

== Charts ==
Chart performance for Finally Over It
Chart (2025)	Peak position
Australian Albums (ARIA)	19
Australian Hip Hop/R&B Albums (ARIA)	2
Belgian Albums (Ultratop Flanders)	63
Belgian Albums (Ultratop Wallonia)	114
Canadian Albums (Billboard)	12
Dutch Albums (Album Top 100)	20
French Albums (SNEP)	95
Irish Albums (IRMA)	90
New Zealand Albums (RMNZ)	16
Nigerian Albums (TurnTable) The Afterparty	82
Norwegian Albums (IFPI Norge)	96
Portuguese Albums (AFP)	32
Swiss Albums (Schweizer Hitparade)	28
UK Albums (Official Charts)	13
UK R&B Albums (Official Charts)	4
US Billboard 200	2
US Top R&B/Hip-Hop Albums (Billboard)	1

== Release history ==
Release dates and formats for Finally Over It
Region	Date	Format(s)	Label	Ref.
Various	November 14, 2025	CD; LP; digital download; streaming	LVRN; Interscope	
