= Montell Fish =

American singer-songwriter (born 1997)

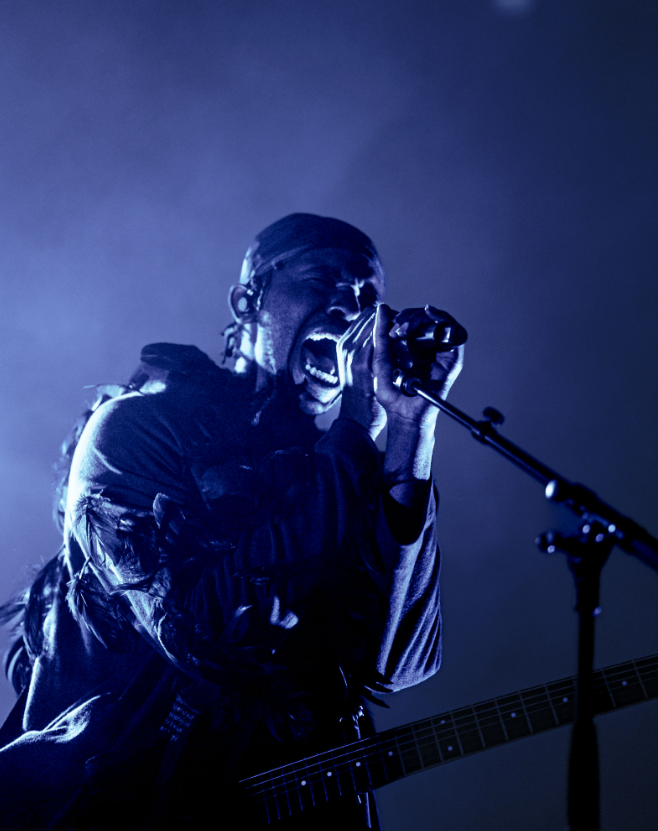
- Montell Fish performing in 2024

Background information
- Also known as: dj gummy bear
- Born: Montell James Frazier; October 19, 1997 (age 28); Pittsburgh, Pennsylvania
- Education: City Charter High School
- Genres: Alternative R&B; bedroom pop; neo soul
- Years active: 2016–present
- Labels: Virgin; Jamie Charlotte Marshall
- Website: www.jamiecharlottemarshall.com

Montell James Frazier (born October 19, 1997), also known as Montell Fish, is an American singer-songwriter. Formerly making music under the CCM genre, he switched to alternative R&B and neo soul. He has since signed to Virgin Music Group for distribution and released two albums under the deal: Jamie in 2022 and Charlotte in 2024.

== Early life ==
Montell James Frazier was born on October 19, 1997, in the Beechview neighborhood of Pittsburgh, Pennsylvania. His mother was a devout Christian, but his father was not. They split when Fish was six months old. He attended City Charter High School. He began recording music at the age of thirteen and was inspired by his father, who is also a musician.

== Career ==
Fish released his third project, Somewhere in the Forest/Reading the Bible, in 2015, in the summer of his senior year of high school. He had previously released a mixtape entitled My Friend's Couch and an EP called King David EP. My Friend's Couch detailed his experiences with weed and drugs, something that he veered away from following his conversion to Christianity and the release of his second and third projects. Fish released his first studio album, As We Walk into Forever, on August 17, 2016.

In 2021, Fish began to gain popularity from secular songs he was releasing, with the songs "Talk 2 Me" and "Fall in Love with You" especially going viral on TikTok. In July 2022, he and his record label, Lord's Child, signed to Virgin Music Label and Artist Services. He released his second studio album, Jamie, on July 22, 2022, pivoting away from Christian rap and entering alternative R&B and neo soul. It was conceived after a breakup when Fish did not want to continue making gospel or CCM anymore and wanted to experiment. The album is the first in a trilogy with the theme of grief, with Charlotte being released on September 27, 2024 and Marshall yet to be released. In August 2022, Fish performed "Darling", from Jamie, on The Tonight Show Starring Jimmy Fallon. On October 28, 2022, he released the EP Her Love Still Haunts Me Like a Ghost, which he described as a transitional project between his trilogy. It released on the opening night of his A Night With A Ghost Tour in North America. His third studio album, Charlotte, was released on September 27, 2024, under his new label, JCM. It detailed the mid-stages of grief.

== Personal life ==
Fish converted to Christianity in 2015, and it was a central theme in his early music. Prior to his conversion, he was a constant weed smoker and behaved poorly at home. In 2014, he came home one night stoned and his stepdad took him to a Wednesday-night prayer service, which led him to convert and stop smoking. Despite moving away from making Christian music in 2021, Fish is still very religious.

== Influences and artistry ==
Fish's early music was Christian hip-hop and CCM, following his conversion to Christianity. His second studio album was described by Hits to have a "unique fusion of soul, gospel and electronic vibes." Fish has stated that he is influenced by Kanye West, Tyler, the Creator, and Prince, among others. World Religion News has compared him to Bon Iver, James Blake, and Tom Misch. Fish also releases music under the alias dj gummy bear, with more electronic-oriented sounds. Fish likes to create characters to represent parts of his past when making music; Ghost Boy, for example, is the persona on Her Love Still Haunts Me Like a Ghost.

== Discography ==
=== Studio albums ===
Title	Details
As We Walk into Forever	Released: August 17, 2016; Label: Lord's Child; Formats: Digital download
Jamie	Released: July 22, 2022; Label: Lord's Child; Formats: Digital download, LP
Charlotte	Released: September 27, 2024; Label: JCM; Formats: Digital download, LP

=== Extended plays ===
Title	Details
Bedroom Gospel	Released: April 4, 2017; Label: Lord's Child; Formats: Digital download
It's Beautiful.	Released: August 10, 2018; Label: Lord's Child; Formats: Digital download
Her Love Still Haunts Me Like a Ghost	Released: October 28, 2022; Label: Lord's Child; Formats: Digital download

=== Singles ===
Title	Year	Album
"Destroy Hell."	2017	Non-album single
"Healer"	2017	Non-album single
"Clear Pictures"	2018	Non-album single
"Stay Patient."	2018	Non-album single
"Mercy"	2018	Non-album single
"Heavenly Father"	2018	It's Beautiful.
"Don't Be Afraid to Fly"	2018	Non-album single
"Idea #273 / Need U."	2019	Non-album single
"You Love Has Called Me Back."	2019	Non-album single
"Stay (With Me)."	2019	Non-album single
"Eyes Only for You"	2019	Non-album single
"Orion"	2020	Non-album single
"Imagination"	2020	Non-album single
"Getting Stronger"	2020	Non-album single
"Talk 2 Me"	2021	Jamie
"Can't Get Enough"	2021	Non-album single
"Wings"	2021	Non-album single
"Call U Tomorrow"	2021	Non-album single
"Fall in Love with You."	2021	Jamie
"Destroy Myself Just For You"	2021	Jamie
"And i'd go a thousand miles"	2022	Jamie
"Hollow Lover"	2022	Non-album single
"love you more than me"	2022	Non-album single
"Hotel"	2022	Her Love Still Haunts Me Like a Ghost
"Exscape"	2022	Her Love Still Haunts Me Like a Ghost
"Bathroom"	2022	Her Love Still Haunts Me Like a Ghost
"I Just Wanna Feel Your Love Again"	2023	Non-album single
"Who Did You Touch?"	2024	Charlotte
"Is it a Crime?"	2024	Charlotte
"Distraction / Scream My Name"	2024	Non-album single
"Aeon"	2024	Non-album single
"What's It Take to Be a Star"	2024	Charlotte
"i cant tell (love my money)"	2024	Non-album single
"Days Are Getting Shorter"	2025	Non-album single
"Love You Right" (with Clara La San)	2026	Non-album single
