= Go Girl (Summer Walker, Latto and Doja Cat song) =

2025 song by Summer Walker, Latto and Doja Cat

Single by Summer Walker, Latto and Doja Cat

from the album Finally Over It
- Released: March 10, 2026
- Genre: Hip-hop soul; R&B
- Length: 3:50
- Label: LVRN; Interscope
- Songwriters: Summer Walker; Alyssa Stephens; Amala Dlamini; David Bishop; Anthony Jefferies; Terrace Martin; Ronald Colson; Zachary Seman; Roger Kleinman; Glenn Bolton; Shahid Wright; Leonardo Roman; Paul Huston; Martin Nemley; Arnold Hamilton; Christopher Smith; Jeremy Felton; Sonyae Elise
- Producers: Dos Dias; Nineteen85; Martin; Flippa; Zach & Roger; Kleinman

Summer Walker singles chronology
"FMT" (2025)	"Go Girl" (2026)	"Slick (Remix)" (2026)

Latto singles chronology
"Gyatt" (2025)	"Go Girl" (2026)	"Business and Personal (Intro)" (2026)

Doja Cat singles chronology
"Gorgeous" (2025)	"Go Girl" (2026)	"Okayyy" (2026)

Lyric video
- "Go Girl" on YouTube

"Go Girl" is a song by American singer Summer Walker and American rappers Latto and Doja Cat. It was released to US rhythmic radio on March 10, 2026 as the third single from Walker's third studio album, Finally Over It. The song was produced by Dos Dias, Nineteen85, Terrace Martin, Flippa, Zach & Roger and Roger Kleinman. It contains a sample of "Go Stetsa I" by Stetsasonic and "Go Girl" by Baby Bash.

== Composition ==
"Go Girl" is a hip-hop soul song. Summer Walker raps on the song, praising herself in the lyrics.

== Critical reception ==
In his review of Finally Over It, Jon Caramanica of The New York Times wrote that "Walker has a knack for bringing in like-minded comic cynics", citing Doja Cat on "Go Girl" as an example. Kyann-Sian Williams of NME criticized the song, stating "We are also robbed of a girl anthem on 'Go Girl': Walker's rap is lethargic, Latto fumbles in this languid world and Doja Cat is too late to save the dreary song." Rawiya Kameir of Pitchfork responded more favorably, remarking that Walker "proffers a clipped self-appraisal that lands more like statement of fact than affirmation, finding natural rhythm with Latto's boastful drawl; true beauty seeks to convince no one. Both handily outrap Doja Cat, who trails with the overworked affect of someone shooting for latter day-Eminem but landing closer to Qveen Herby."

== Charts ==
Chart performance for "Go Girl"
Chart (2025–2026)	Peak position
US Billboard Hot 100	60
US Hot R&B/Hip-Hop Songs (Billboard)	11
US Rhythmic Airplay (Billboard)	26
