= OMB Bloodbath =

American rapper

- Born: Alexandra Elizabeth Nicks; December 2, 1993 (age 32)
- Genres: Hip hop
- Occupation: Musician
- Years active: 2015–present
- Labels: Love Renaissance, Interscope Records

Alexandra Elizabeth Nicks(born December 2, 1993), better known as OMB Bloodbath is an American rapper from Houston. She is currently signed to Love Renaissance (LVRN) and Interscope Records.

== Career ==
OMB Bloodbath started making music in the vibrant Houston underground scene with the release of scathing freestyle videos. This helped her build a loyal fanbase. She went viral when she partook in the #SogoneChallenge, a challenge where people rapped over Monica's "So Gone" instrumental, a song from Monica's fourth studio album "After The Storm". On the 4th of May 2020, OMB Bloodbath got her big break when she signed a record deal with Interscope Records in partnership with 10:22PM and Love Renaissance (LVRN). Days after her record deal, she released the Maxo Kream assisted "Dropout".

== Discography ==
=== Albums ===
- Nothing but the Moon (2017)
- Nothing but the Moon 2 (2018)
- Nothing but the Moon 3 (2019)
- A few forevers (2019)

=== Singles and EPs ===
- Remedies To Infinity EP (2022)
- Blood Sample (2021)
- Aye BB (2020)
- Dropout (2020)
- For Me (2020)
- My Body (2019)
- Peanut Butter (2019)
- Could've Been (2019)
- All I Know (2018)
- Let Go (2018)
