= Robbed You =

2025 song by Summer Walker and Mariah the Scientist

Song by Summer Walker and Mariah the Scientist

from the album Finally Over It
- Released: November 14, 2025
- Genre: R&B
- Length: 3:18
- Label: LVRN; Interscope
- Songwriters: Summer Walker; Mariah Buckles; Nija Charles; David Bishop; Anthony Jefferies; Rami Dawod; Arsenio Archer; Curtis Jackson; David Brown; Rondell Turner; Tre'Von Waters
- Producers: Dos Dias; Nineteen85; Dawod; Archer

"Robbed You" is a song by American singers Summer Walker and Mariah the Scientist, released on November 14, 2025, from the former's third studio album, Finally Over It. It was produced by Dos Dias, Nineteen85, Rami Dawod and Arsenio Archer. The song contains a sample of "I'll Whip Ya Head Boy" by 50 Cent.

== Content ==
The song finds Summer Walker addressing a feckless ex-boyfriend with frustration. She centers on his foolishness, noting how she could have easily taken advantage of his trust and it would have been beneficial if she robbed and "popped" him.

== Critical reception ==
Andy Kellman of AllMusic wrote that the artists "gracefully upbraid a chump" in the song. Kyann-Sian Williams of NME compared the song to her song "I'll Kill You" in regard to the "sugarcoated violence", but commented "Though, where Jhene Aiko slipped in perfectly on 'I'll Kill You', Mariah The Scientist's stoic energy dulls what could have been a thrilling highlight." Rawiya Kameir of Pitchfork cited the song as an instance showing that Summer Walker "fares better when her costars are women". She described it to be "more esprit d'escalier regret than warning" and Walker as "crafting a hook from imperfect anaphora."

== Charts ==
Chart performance for "Robbed You"
Chart (2025)	Peak position
New Zealand Hot Singles (RMNZ)	16
US Billboard Hot 100	58
US Hot R&B/Hip-Hop Songs (Billboard)	10
