= Baby (Summer Walker and Chris Brown song) =

2025 song by Summer Walker and Chris Brown

Song by Summer Walker and Chris Brown

from the album Finally Over It
- Released: November 14, 2025
- Genre: R&B
- Length: 2:28
- Label: LVRN; Interscope
- Songwriters: Summer Walker; Christopher Brown; Ant Clemons; Elliott Trent; Genia Simone; Jean-Baptiste Kouame; Ryan Buendia; Karl Rubin; Ryan Press; Bishop; Mariah Carey; Jermaine Dupri; Manuel Seal
- Producers: Jean Baptiste; Buendia; Rubin; Press; Dos Dias

Audio video
- "Baby" on YouTube

"Baby" is a song by American singers Summer Walker and Chris Brown from the former's third studio album, Finally Over It (2025). It contains a vocal sample of "Always Be My Baby" by Mariah Carey. The song was produced by Jean Baptiste, Ryan Buendia, Karl Rubin, Ryan Press and Dos Dias.

== Critical reception ==
Kyann-Sian Williams of NME considered "Baby" the "most polarising moment" on Finally Over It, because Chris Brown "is flat when doubling the chorus with Walker – wasting the sample of Mariah Carey's 'Always Be My Baby' – but the melody is so hypnotic, you'll sway and roll your shoulders in an unexpected Uno reverse moment that (kinda) works." Rawiya Kameir of Pitchfork described the sample and interpolation of "Always Be My Baby" as "sullying the promise of an everlasting duet with a dispassionate performance from Chris Brown, who continues to patronize major-label releases with the enforced ubiquity of a mafia racket."

== Charts ==
Chart performance for "Baby"
Chart (2025)	Peak position
New Zealand Hot Singles (RMNZ)	11
US Billboard Hot 100	68
US Hot R&B/Hip-Hop Songs (Billboard)	15
