= No (Summer Walker song) =

2025 song by Summer Walker

Song by Summer Walker

from the album Finally Over It
- Released: November 14, 2025
- Genre: R&B
- Length: 2:26
- Label: LVRN; Interscope
- Songwriters: Summer Walker; Tre'Von Waters; Jabreh Shaw; Terrace Martin; Troy Taylor; Jerome Monroe Jr.; Bishop; Tim Maxey; Beyoncé Knowles; Shawn Carter; Bernard Edwards Jr.
- Producers: Martin; Troy Taylor U the Goat; Slimwav; Dos Dias; Maxey

"No" is a song by American singer Summer Walker from her third studio album, Finally Over It (2025). It contains a vocal sample of "Yes" by Beyoncé. The song was produced by Terrace Martin, Troy Taylor U the Goat, Slimwav, Dos Dias and Tim Maxey.

== Composition ==
"No" is a midtempo song about setting boundaries in a relationship. It begins with a sample of "Yes". Rawiya Kameir of Pitchfork noted the song "firmly rejects the gendered domesticity famously pledged on Destiny's Child's 'Cater 2 U.'"

== Critical reception ==
In his review of Finally Over It, Andy Kellman of AllMusic wrote that "Walker and company skillfully reference '90s and 2000s R&B, most cleverly so on 'No,' a ne'er-do-well rebuke that upends Beyoncé's "Yes" while retaining that song's seductive sonics."

== Charts ==
Chart performance for "No"
Chart (2025)	Peak position
New Zealand Hot Singles (RMNZ)	22
US Billboard Hot 100	69
US Hot R&B/Hip-Hop Songs (Billboard)	16
