= Nondi (musician) =

Electronic musician

Tatiana Triplin, known professionally as Nondi_ and formerly known as Yakui, is an electronic music producer based in Johnstown, Pennsylvania. She has released music under various aliases, and runs her own netlabel HRR Recordings. Her music has been described as "dreamlike" and a fusion of footwork, breakcore, and Detroit techno.

== Early life ==
Triplin grew up in Johnstown, Pennsylvania, a town that had suffered through many catastrophic floods through its history, with her family surviving the 1977 flooding. Her interest in electronic dance music sparked from rhythm games like StepMania, and she regularly listened to and was influenced by the works of Aphex Twin, DJ Rashad, and Moodymann.

Her brother, Eem Triplin, is a rapper.

== Career ==
In 2023, Triplin would release her debut album under the Nondi_ alias, Flood City Trax, a concept album about her hometown, Johnstown, on the UK-based Planet Mu label.

On February 27, 2026, Triplin's second album, Nondi... was released.

== Discography ==
=== As Nondi_ ===
==== Studio albums ====
- Flood City Trax (2023)
- Trax From Across the River (2025)
- Centre Blanky (2025)
- Nondi... (2026)

==== Mixtapes ====
- Shadow (2023)
- Mixtape (2024)
- July Mixtape (2024)
- My Charming Mixtape (2025)
- My Gloomy Mixtape (2026)

=== As Yakui ===
==== Studio albums ====
- Sketches and Thoughts (2013)
- Yakui (2014)
- Pure Data Decay (2015)
- Creeper (2015)
- Pillars / Other Heart Tracks (2016)
- No Title / The Second Evergristle (2016)
- Imni (2019)
- Soultek (2020)
- Oppression Nodes (2020)
- Low Pressure (2020)
