= Awkward Freestyle =

2022 single by Eem Triplin

Single by Eem Triplin
- Released: March 31, 2022
- Genre: Hip-hop; sample drill
- Length: 2:07
- Songwriter: Naeem Triplin
- Producer: Eem Triplin

Eem Triplin singles chronology
"Mr Clean" (2022)	"Awkward Freestyle" (2022)	"Louie V" (2022)

Music video
- "Awkward Freestyle" on YouTube

"Awkward Freestyle" is a single by American rapper Eem Triplin, released on March 31, 2022. It contains a sample of "Awkward" by Tyler, the Creator and went viral on the video-sharing app TikTok, becoming his breakout song,

== Background ==
Eem Triplin experimented with sampling "Awkward" by Tyler, the Creator years before the release of "Awkward Freestyle". The song is about a breakup, with Triplin using a fast-paced flow over "syrupy, slow-paced samples" and rapping in a melancholic, bitter tone. In the following several weeks, the song achieved popularity on TikTok and garnered over two million streams on Spotify. It eventually attracted the attention of Tyler, the Creator himself, who endorsed the song.

== Critical reception ==
The Fader wrote of the song, "It's become an underground hit through TikTok, planting Eem on Rolling Loud bills and even receiving a blessing from Tyler himself. And for good reason: On the track, Eem effortlessly threads the needle between the chilly fuzz of sample drill and the warm snaps of L.A. street rap, creating something entirely his own. The real sauce, though, is Eem's soft pitched-up and layered vocals, a cool, bedroom pop-esque mutation of X and Kodak that imbues every word with soul."

== Certifications ==
Region	Certification	Certified units/sales
United States (RIAA)	Gold	500,000^{‡}
^{‡} Sales+streaming figures based on certification alone.
