= FMT (song) =

2025 single by Summer Walker

Single by Summer Walker

from the album Finally Over It
- Released: November 14, 2025
- Genre: Country pop
- Length: 3:28
- Label: LVRN; Interscope
- Songwriters: Summer Walker; Lee Stashenko; Stavros Tsarouhas
- Producers: Fallen; Tsarouhas; Terrace Martin

Summer Walker singles chronology
"Spend It" (2025)	"FMT" (2025)	"Go Girl" (2026)

Music video
- "FMT" on YouTube

"FMT" (acronym for "Fuck My Type") is a song by American singer Summer Walker, released on November 14, 2025, as the second single from her third studio album, Finally Over It, which was released on the same day. It was produced by Fallen, Stavros Tsarouhas and Terrace Martin.

== Composition ==
"FMT" is a country pop ballad, described as similar to "Nobody Gets Me" by SZA. Backed by acoustic guitars, Summer Walker croons about being unable to find a suitable boyfriend among the men she is attracted to, and repeatedly falling for these types of men. She longs for genuine love and "passionate touches", and is disappointed that she must forgo them for transactional relationships.

== Music video ==
The music video was directed by Child and released alongside the single. In it, Summer Walker engages in a ritual bath, assisted by elders.

== Charts ==
Chart performance for "FMT"
Chart (2025)	Peak position
New Zealand Hot Singles (RMNZ)	9
UK Singles (OCC)	93
US Billboard Hot 100	79
