= Eem Triplin =

American rapper (born 2001)

- Born: Naeem Muhammad Triplin; February 13, 2001 (age 25); Johnstown, Pennsylvania, U.S.
- Education: Greater Johnstown High School
- Genre: Plugg
- Years active: 2018–present
- Label: RCA
- Website: www.eemtriplin.com

Naeem Muhammad Triplin (born February 13, 2001), known professionally as Eem Triplin, is an American rapper and record producer from Johnstown, Pennsylvania. He began his career producing beats for underground hip hop artists, most prominently $not, before drawing wider attention in 2022 with the single "Awkward Freestyle," which circulated widely on TikTok. After signing with RCA Records, Triplin released his debut studio album, Melody of a Memory, on February 17, 2025, and was named to XXL's 2025 "Freshman Class" later that year.

== Early life ==
Naeem Muhammad Triplin was born on February 13, 2001, in Johnstown, Pennsylvania. His sister, Tatiana Triplin, is an electronic musician who has worked under the name Nondi_. Triplin attended Greater Johnstown High School and played percussion for the school's band.

== Career ==
=== 2015–2025: Origin and initial virality ===
Triplin created a YouTube channel on May 16, 2015, and began posting original beats there shortly afterward. By 2018, Triplin was producing professionally, selling beats through YouTube and BeatStars and supplying instrumentals to underground rappers. His most frequent collaborator during this period was the Florida rapper $not, for whom he produced tracks including "Revenge," "Benzo" and "Davanti."

On March 31, 2022, Triplin released "Awkward Freestyle," a single built around a sample of "Awkward" from Tyler, the Creator's 2013 album Wolf. The song circulated on TikTok and became Triplin's first widely heard recording. Tyler, the Creator publicly endorsed the track on social media, which Triplin has cited as a turning point in his solo career. In 2022, Triplin made his first appearance at the Rolling Loud festival in New York; as a consolation prize for the small audience of thirteen people at that performance, the festival sent him a custom-painted Xbox console. He returned to perform at Rolling Loud California and Rolling Loud Miami in 2023.

In early 2023, Pigeons & Planes, the music vertical of Complex, included Triplin on its annual list "23 Artists to Watch in 2023." From May to June 2023, he served as a supporting act on $Not's 35-date Get Busy Or Die North American tour, alongside Night Lovell and DC the Don. That year he also opened on some dates of Lucki's Flawless Like Me Tour. On July 9, 2023, Triplin released his debut extended play, Still Pretty, supported by the singles "Walked In" and "Tell Me I'm Right". Later that year, he headlined his own thirteen-date Still Pretty Tour, which ran from mid-November through December 10, 2023, opening in Toronto and concluding in Sacramento.

=== 2025–present: Melody of a Memory and continued growth ===
After signing with RCA Records, Triplin released a series of singles in 2024 and early 2025 leading up to his debut album. These included "Crazy H*es," "FIJI" featuring Cruza, "Stephanie," "Yeah Yeah!", and "Miss Me?." In October 2024, he opened for multiple dates of Bryson Tiller's The Bryson Tiller Tour. Triplin's debut studio album, Melody of a Memory, was released on February 17, 2025, through RCA Records. The 13-track project was executive produced by Dahi, with additional production from Matthew Castellanos, Charlie Myles and Triplin himself. Guest artists included Cruza on "FIJI" and Ty Dolla $ign on "Out Miami." To support the album, Triplin embarked on the 27-date Melody of a Memory Tour across North America, which began on May 1, 2025, in Pittsburgh and concluded on June 13, 2025, in New York City.

On October 24, 2025, Triplin released the standalone single "Coming Undone." On February 13, 2026, his 25th birthday, Triplin released his second extended play, a love song for u, through RCA Records. It featured production from Charlie Myles, Steven Shaeffer and Triplin himself.

== Influences and artistry ==
Triplin's music has been categorized as plugg and he has been compared to Florida rapper 454 in his style, with them both having a "hyperactive sound" and "hypnotic flows". The Fader categorizes Triplin as "a descendant of Duwap Kaine" with his "loose melodicism and unapologetic hedonism." He uses a unique voice in his music that sets him apart from others in the genre.

== Discography ==
=== Studio albums ===
Title	Details
Melody of a Memory	Released: February 17, 2025; Label: RCA; Formats: Digital download, LP

=== Extended plays ===
Title	Details
Nowh3r3	Released: February 13, 2019; Label: Topside The Lable; Formats: Digital download
No More Tears	Released: December 5, 2019; Label: Topside The Lable; Formats: Digital download
Still Pretty	Released: July 9, 2023; Label: Self-released; Formats: Digital download
Coming Undone	Released: October 24, 2025; Label: RCA; Formats: Digital download
a love song for u	Released: February 13, 2026; Label: RCA; Formats: Digital download

=== Singles ===
==== As lead artist ====
Title	Year	Album
"Cut Ties"	2018	Non-album single
"Watch Ya Step (Freestyle)"	2019	Non-album single
"Bounce Back"	2020	Non-album single
"Bout It"	2020	Non-album single
"Bitch Mob"	2020	Non-album single
"New Jack City"	2022	Non-album single
"Mr Clean"	2022	Non-album single
"Awkward Freestyle"	2022	Non-album single
"Louie V"	2022	Non-album single
"London Tipton"	2022	Non-album single
"If You Go"	2022	Non-album single
"Tribulations"	2022	Non-album single
"Around the World"	2022	Non-album single
"Heartbeat"	2022	Non-album single
"Chain Hang Low"	2022	Non-album single
"Just Friends ?"	2022	Non-album single
"Let You Know" (with $not)	2022	Non-album single
"Walked In"	2023	Still Pretty
"Tell Me Im Right"	2023	Still Pretty
"Yeah Yeah!"	2023	Non-album single
"stephanie"	2024	Non-album single
"Fiji" (with Cruza)	2024	Melody of a Memory
"Crazy H*es"	2024	Melody of a Memory
"Miss Me?"	2025	Melody of a Memory
"Duya"	2025	Melody of a Memory
"Coming Undone"	2025	Non-album single

==== As featured artist ====
List of singles, showing year released, chart positions, and name of the album
Title	Year	Peak chart positions		Album
Title	Year	US R&B/HH	US R&B	Album
"Coconut" (Sailorr featuring Eem Triplin)	2025	43	8	From Florida's Finest Delu/xxx (For My Delusional Ex)
"New Friends" ( Malcolm Todd (feat. Eem Triplin)	2024			Sweet Boy
"baby pink" (Camila Cabello feat. Eem Triplin)	2024			C,XOXO (Magic City Edition)

== Tours ==
=== Headlining ===
- Still Pretty Tour (2023)
- Melody of a Memory Tour (2025)

=== Supporting ===
- Flawless Like Me Tour (Lucki) (2023)
- Get Busy or Die Tour ($not) (2023)
- Bryson Tiller East Coast Headline Shows (Bryson Tiller) (2024)
