= TxC =

South African DJs and record production duo

- Origin: Gqeberha, Eastern Cape, South Africa
- Genres: Amapiano
- Years active: 2019–present
- Labels: TxC Enterprises; LVRN
- Members: Tarryn Reid; Clairise Hefke

TxC is a South African DJ and record production duo composed of Tarryn Reid and Clairise Hefke. They gained popularity after going viral on social media. They performed at the 2022 FIFA World Cup and the Fan Festival in Qatar. TxC won the BET Award for Best New International Act at the 2025 BET Awards.

== History ==
=== Background ===
TxC is a South African DJ and record production duo originating in Gqeberha, Eastern Cape. They are both of Coloured ancestry. Composed of childhood friends, Tarryn Reid and Clairise Hefke, the TxC brand was inspired by their ex-boyfriends who were also DJs. They graduated from Kue DJ Academy, a DJ-ing school, gained popularity after uploading their content on social media, and later scored their first gig on 28 October 2019 in Johannesburg. Tarryn and Clairise are also fashion models, their performance outfits are designed by Tarryn. They look up to Alessandro Michele, creative director for Gucci and Rihanna amongst others.

=== Career ===
In 2022, they embarked on a world tour in support of their debut extended play (EP), A Fierce Piano (2022). TxC performed at the 2022 FIFA World Cup and the FIFA Fan Festival in Qatar from 30 November to 3 December. During an interview with GQ (South Africa) in November 2022, TxC said that they sold out shows in 22 countries including Dubai in the United Arab Emirates and the United Kingdom.

In 2024, TxC signed a recording contract with Love Renaissance (LVRN), a United States-based record label distributed through The Orchard (Sony Music), it houses the likes of 6lack and Summer Walker just to mention a few. Led by a single, "Turn Off the Lights" (2023), the duo self released their second EP of the same name under exclusive license to LVRN on 7 June 2024.

== Discography ==
=== Extended plays ===
- A Fierce Piano (2022)
- Turn Off the Lights (2024)
- Straata (2026)

=== Singles ===
List of singles as lead artist, with selected chart positions and certifications, showing year released and album name
Title	Year	Peak chart positions	Certifications	Album
Title	Year	SA	Certifications	Album
"Too Deep" (featuring Dinky Kunene and TNK MusiQ)	2022	—		Non-album single
"Turn Off the Lights" (with Tony Duardo)	2023	— (Note: "Turn Off the Lights" did not enter the Official South African Streaming Charts, but peaked at number 7 on the Radio Charts.)		Turn Off the Lights
"Yebo" (with Davido, featuring Leemckrazy, Djy Biza and Tony Duardo)	2024	—	RiSA: Gold	Turn Off the Lights
"As'jike" (featuring W4DE, Buddy Kay, Chley, Pcee and Danny Shades)	2024	—		Non-album single
"Bom Bom (Shoni Kompo)" (with Pheelz and Scotts Maphuma, featuring Al Xapo)	2025	—		Non-album single
"Welele"		-		Non-album single
"Nakupenda"		-		Non-album single
"—" denotes items which were not released in that country or failed to chart.

== Tours ==
- Fierce Piano World Tour (2022)

== Accolades ==
List of awards and nominations received by TxCAwards and nominations received by TxC
Award	Year (Note: Indicates the year of ceremony. Each year is linked to the article about the awards held that year, wherever possible.)	Category	Recipient(s) or nominee(s)	Result	Ref.
Basadi in Music Awards	2023	Duo/Collaboration of the Year	"Vuka Mawulele" (with Khanyisa)	Nominated	
Urban Music Awards	2025	Best Music Video	"Yebo" (with Davido featuring Tony Duardo, LeeMckrazy and DJ Biza)	Nominated	
BET Awards	2025	Best New International Act	TxC	Won	
