= Odeal =

German-Nigerian singer and songwriter

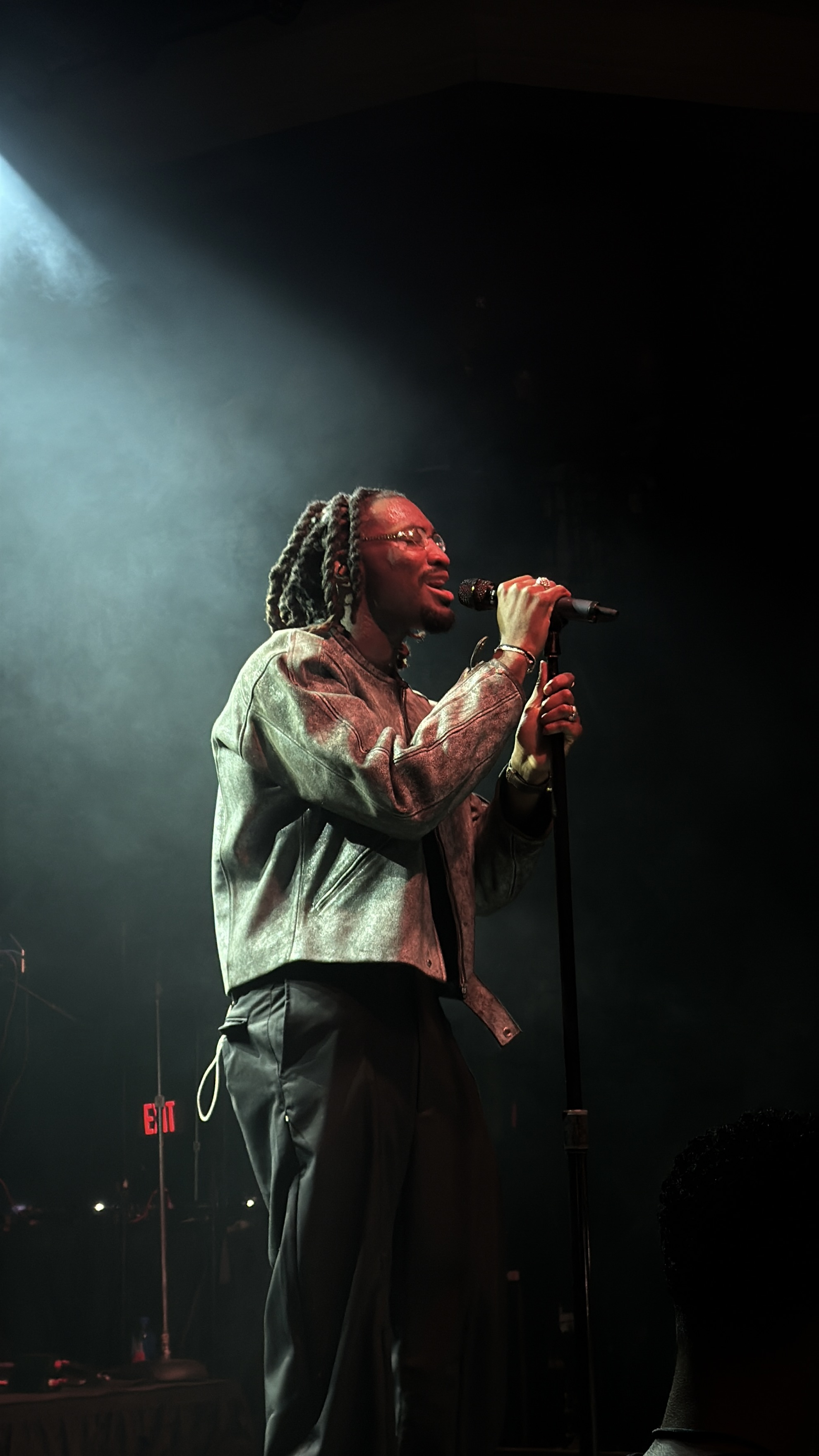
- Odeal performing on tour in Oct 2025

Background information
- Born: Hillary Dennis Udanoh; December 13, 1999 (age 26); Germany
- Genres: R&B; Afro-fusion; Afropop; alternative pop; Alté; Afroswing
- Occupations: Singer; songwriter
- Instrument: Vocals
- Years active: 2014–present
- Labels: OVMBR; LVRN

Hillary Dennis Udanoh (born 13 December 1999), known professionally as Odeal, is a British singer-songwriter of Nigerian origin. He rose to prominence with the release of the song "Soh-Soh" which peaked at 3 on the UK Afrobeats Singles Chart, peaked at 12 on the Billboard U.S. Afrobeats Songs, and peaked at 42 on the Nigeria Official Top 100 Songs. On 2 September 2025, Billboard named Odeal as its African Rookie of the Year.

== Early life ==
Hillary Dennis Udanoh was born in Germany to Igbo Nigerian parents. His early childhood was marked by movement across Europe and Africa: at the age of three, he relocated to Spain, and around age six, his family settled in the United Kingdom. He recalls that, even as a toddler, he preferred singing along to his mother's CDs over watching cartoons, and she encouraged his passion by gifting him a toy microphone that became an early creative tool.

At age fourteen, Odeal moved to Awka in Anambra State, Nigeria, to attend boarding school and live with his father. There, he discovered a local youth club recording studio and spent his free time crafting his earliest original songs, inspired by R&B rather than the mainstream African pop around him. Despite initial cultural differences in musical style, he remained dedicated, learning by observation and immersing himself in studio sessions.

During his school years, Odeal continued exploring music production, even installing FruityLoops on a school computer and secretly composing beats late at night—an experiment that was eventually discovered, but revealed his deep commitment to craft. After returning to London at seventeen, he witnessed the rise of Afroswing in the UK. Initially collaborating with the group TMG, he soon embarked on a solo path, releasing his debut EP Need Time in 2017. Earlier that year, he also experienced a serious illness that required hospitalization, which intensified his determination to leave a meaningful mark through music.

== Career ==
In 2014, Hillary Dennis Udanoh began his music career by releasing covers on YouTube. In 2017, he made his official debut with the independently Love Renaissance distributed the extended play New Time. In the same year, Odeal launched OVMBR, a music collective and record label, in November. In 2018, he released the Pragma EP. In 2020, he signed with Warner Music UK and released OVMBR: Roses. In 2021, he released OVMBR:Hits No Mrs, through Warner Music UK. In 2022, he went solo, and released "Coffee (Don't Read Signs)", independently through OVMBR. On 21 May 2022, "Coffee (Don't Read Signs)" debut at number 11 on the UK Afrobeats Singles Chart.

On 2 December 2022, Odeal released OVMBR: Maybe I’m Best Alone. In 2023, Odeal released "Be Easy", and it debuted at number 10 on the UK Afrobeats chart. On 24 November 2023, he released Thoughts I Never Said, through OVMBR. In 2024, Odeal signed up for Ditto label services, and released "Onome" on 14 June 2024, and it peaked at number 10 on the UK official Afrobeats chart. On 5 July 2024, he released the extended play Sunday at Zuri. From the extended play, "Soh-Soh" became his major hit record, and went viral on TikTok. On 29 July 2024, Odeal made his first chart entry on the Official Nigeria Top 100 songs at number 83, and reached number 42 .

On 21 September 2024, "Soh-Soh" peaked at number 3 on the UK Afrobeat chart. On 5 October 2024, "Soh-Soh" peaked at number 12 on Billboard U.S. Afrobeats Songs, and debuted at number 29, on 20 July. On 11 October 2024, Odeal released "Temptress". On 26 October 2024, "Temptress" debut at number 16 on the UK Afrobeat chart. On 31 October 2024, Billboard listed "Temptress" as one of its Afrobeats Fresh Picks of the week. On 14 November 2024, Odeal released "You’re Stuck", featuring Summer Walker, and signed with Love Renaissance. 30 November 2024, "You’re Stuck" peaked at number 2 on the UK Afrobeats chart.

On 15 November 2024, Odeal release his extended play Lustropolis, through OVMBR, and Love Renaissance (LVRN). On 20 November 2024, released the official music video of "You’re Stuck", featuring Summer Walker, and produced by Blank Square Productions. On 24 January 2025, he released Lustropolis: Melody Avenue, a no-drum version of his debut album Lustropolis. On 30 January 2025, Billboard named Odeal, African Rookie of the Month. On 11 April 2025, he featured on Lojay's "Mwah!", and debuted at number 16 on the UK Afrobeats chart. On 30 May 2025, he released "London Summers", accompanied by a music video.

On 11 July 2025, he released his extended play The Summer That Saved Me.

== Discography ==
=== Extended plays ===
- New Time (2017)
- Pragma EP (2018)
- OVMBR: Maybe I’m Best Alone (2022)
- Sunday at Zuri's (2024)
- The Summer That Saved Me (2025)
- The Fall That Saved Us (2025)
- For a Good Time... (2026)

=== Mixtapes ===
- OVMBR: Roses (2020)
- Thoughts I Never Said (2023)
- Lustropolis (2024)
- Lustropolis: Melody Avenue (2025)

=== Selected singles ===
As lead artist
Year	Title	Album
2022	"Coffee (Don't Read Signs)"	Non-album single
2023	"Be Easy"	Non-album single
2024	"Onome"	Sunday At Zuri's
2024	"Temptress"	Lustropolis
2024	"You’re Stuck" (featuring Summer Walker)	Lustropolis
2025	"London Summers"	The Summer That Saved Me
2025	"Miami" (featuring Leon Thomas)	The Summer That Saved Me
2026	"24 Hours" (with Stormzy)	TBA
As featured artist
Year	Title	Album
2025	"Mwah!" (Lojay featuring Odeal)	TBA

== Awards and nominations ==
Award	Year	Recipient(s) and nominees(s)	Category	Result	Ref.
MOBO Awards	2025	"Soh-Soh"	Song of the Year	Nominated	
MOBO Awards	2025	Himself	Best R&B/Soul Act	Won	
MOBO Awards	2025	Himself	Best Newcomer	Won	
BET Awards	2025	Himself	Best New International Act	Nominated	
Billboard R&B/Hip-Hop Power Players	2025	Himself	R&B, Hip-Hop and African Rookies of the Year	Won	
