= The Summer that Saved Me =

EP by Odeal
- Released: July 11, 2025
- Recorded: 2025
- Genre: Alternative R&B; Afrobeats
- Length: 20:34
- Label: OVMBR, LVRN
- Producer: Shae Jacobs; Harry Westlake; Ezra Skys; Finn Wigan; Billy Blunt; Chris Kurisu; Jack Dine; P2J; GuiltyBeatz; Cameron Griffin; Tyrell Evans; Monster Boys

Odeal chronology
Lustropolis (2024)	The Summer that Saved Me (2025)

Singles from The Summer That Saved Me
- 1. "Miami" Released: 9 July 2025

The Summer that Saved Me is an extended play by British‑Nigerian singer-songwriter Odeal, released on 11 July 2025 through his own imprint OVMBR in partnership with LVRN. The EP is a mixture of R&B, Afrobeats, Soul, and Alté. Odeal describes EP as an expression of liberation, emotional renewal, and artistic revival. The title captures the sense of freedom he experienced after finally receiving his British passport, which gave him the ability to rediscover and reconnect with different aspects of himself.

The EP was exclusively produced by Odeal. Songs from the EP were produced by Shae Jacobs, Harry Westlake, Ezra Skys, Finn Wigan, Billy Blunt, Chris Kurisu, Jack Dine, P2J, GuiltyBeatz, Cameron Griffin, Tyrell Evans, and Monster Boys (collective members: Genio Bambino, and GMK).

== Background ==
Following the success of previous releases under OVMBR and LVRN, including Sunday at Zuri's and Lustropolis, Odeal delivered The Summer That Saved Me amid a particularly liberating period in his life highlighted by obtaining British citizenship after years of mobility restrictions which served as a creative and personal catalyst. On 18 July 2025, in an interview with Shayna Marie and Robert Bruce, Odeal discussed the project on 1Xtra's Breakfast Show. On 5 September 2025, he spoke to Billboard.

== Release and promotion ==
On 9 July 2025, the lead single "Miami", which features American singer Leon Thomas. Promoting the EP, Odeal headlined "The Show That Save Me" at Village Underground on August 13, 2025.

== Composition ==
The EP weaves R&B, Afrobeats, soul, and alté into a cohesive summer atmosphere. It showcases introspection, romance, and the newfound freedom Odeal expresses through the following tracks: "Miami", featuring Leon Thomas, opens the EP with sun-kissed acoustic R&B, capturing infatuation and emotional clarity. "London Summers" is an Amapiano-inflected ode to the joy of warm seasons in London and nods to Odeal's Nigerian roots intertwined with U.K. living. "My Heart" delivers an intimate, emotionally vulnerable scene of falling deeply in love. "Obi’s Interlude" is raw and soulful, named after a term of endearment from his mother (meaning “heart” in Igbo), representing openness and emotional exposure. "Monster Boys" offers playful, confident energy, acting as a mood lightener after the vulnerability of the interlude. "Patience" reflects on appreciating someone's intentional pace, drawing from the Delilah metaphor to convey slowed but meaningful connection. "In the Chair" closes the EP with a smooth, nostalgic R&B feel, invoking intimacy and reflection.

== Critical reception ==
Critics praised its emotional honesty and sonic diversity. The Native noted its “eclectic” quality and dynamic production.

== Track listing ==
Standard edition
No.	Title	Writer(s)	Producer(s)	Length
1.	"Miami" (featuring Leon Thomas)	Hillary Dennis Udanoh; Leon Thomas III	Harry Westlake	3:36
2.	"London Summers"	Udanoh; Jack Dine; Shae Jacobs	Jacobs; Dine	3:37
3.	"My Heart"	Udanoh	GuiltyBeatz; Harry Westlake; Cameron Griffin; Ezra Skys; Billy Blunt; Tyrell Evans	2:52
4.	"Obi’s Interlude"	Udanoh	Ezra Skys; Billy Blunt	2:56
5.	"Monster Boys"	Udanoh	Monster Boys (Genio Bambino & GMK)	1:53
6.	"Patience"	Udanoh; Richard Olowaranti Mbu Isong	P2J	3:20
7.	"In the Chair"	Udanoh	Finn Wigan; Chris Kurisu	2:17
Total length:				20:34

== Personnel ==
- Odeal – Vocals, executive production
- Leon Thomas – Featured artist (track 1)
- Harry Westlake - production (tracks 1, 3)
- Shae Jacobs - production (tracks 2)
- Jack Dine - production (tracks 2)
- GuiltyBeatz - production (tracks 3)
- Cameron Griffin - production (tracks 3)
- Tyrell Evans - production (tracks 3)
- Ezra Skys - production (tracks 3, 4)
- Billy Blunt - production (tracks 3, 4)
- Monster Boys (M: Genio Bambino, and GMK) - production (tracks 5)
- P2J - production (tracks 6)
- Finn Wigan - production (tracks 7)
- Chris Kurisu - production (tracks 7)
