= BET Award for Best New International Act =

American entertainment award category

BET Awards for Best New International Act
- Awarded for: Prominence international new act in the year under review
- Country: United States
- Presented by: BET Awards
- First award: 2019
- Currently held by: TxC (2025)

The Best New International Act (also known as Viewer's Choice Best New International Act), is an award presented by BET Awards, to honor prominence international artists from around the world yearly. It was first presented to Sho Madjozi in 2019.

== Winners and nominees ==
Winners are listed first and highlighted in bold.

=== 2010s ===
| Year | Artist | Country | Ref |
|---|---|---|---|
2019
| 2019 | **Sho Madjozi** | **South Africa** | |
| 2019 | Teni | Nigeria | |
| 2019 | Octavian | United Kingdom | |
| 2019 | Nesly | France | |
| 2019 | Headie One | United Kingdom | |
| 2019 | Jok'Air | France | |

=== 2020s ===
| Year | Artist | Country | Ref |
|---|---|---|---|
2020
| 2020 | **Sha Sha** | **South Africa** | |
| 2020 | Rema | Nigeria | |
| 2020 | Hatik | France | |
| 2020 | Celeste | United Kingdom | |
| 2020 | Young T & Bugsey | United Kingdom | |
| 2020 | Stacy | France | |
2021
| 2021 | **Bree Runway** | **United Kingdom** | |
| 2021 | Arlo Parks | United Kingdom | |
| 2021 | Bramsito | France | |
| 2021 | Elaine | South Africa | |
| 2021 | MC Dricka | Brazil | |
| 2021 | Ronisia | France | |
| 2021 | Tems | Nigeria | |
2022
| 2022 | **MD Chefe** | **Brazil** | |
| 2022 | Ayra Starr | Nigeria | |
| 2022 | Pheelz | Nigeria | |
| 2022 | Cleo Sol | United Kingdom | |
| 2022 | SDM | France | |
| 2022 | Digga D | United Kingdom | |
| 2022 | Guy2Bezbar | France | |
| 2022 | Young Stunna | South Africa | |
2023
| 2023 | **Libianca** | **Cameroon** | |
| 2023 | Asake | Nigeria | |
| 2023 | Camidoh | Ghana | |
| 2023 | FLO | United Kingdom | |
| 2023 | Maureen | France | |
| 2023 | MC Ryan SP | Brazil | |
| 2023 | Pabi Cooper | South Africa | |
| 2023 | Raye | United Kingdom | |
| 2023 | Werenoi | France | |
2024
| 2024 | **Makhadzi** | **South Africa** | |
| 2024 | Bellah | United Kingdom | |
| 2024 | Cristale | United Kingdom | |
| 2024 | Duquesa | Brazil | |
| 2024 | Holly G | France | |
| 2024 | Jungeli | France | |
| 2024 | Oruam | Brazil | |
| 2024 | Seyi Vibez | Nigeria | |
| 2024 | Tyler ICU | South Africa | |
2025
| 2025 | **TxC** | **South Africa** | |
| 2025 | Ajuliacosta | Brazil | |
| 2025 | Abigail Chams | Tanzania | |
| 2025 | Amabbi | Brazil | |
| 2025 | Dlala Thukzin | South Africa | |
| 2025 | Dr. Yaro | France | |
| 2025 | kwn | United Kingdom | |
| 2025 | Maglera Doe Boy | South Africa | |
| 2025 | Merveille | France | |
| 2025 | Odeal | United Kingdom | |
| 2025 | Shallipopi | Nigeria | |
