= Spend It (Summer Walker song) =

Single by Summer Walker
- Released: May 2, 2025
- Genre: R&B
- Length: 2:45
- Label: LVRN; Interscope
- Songwriter: Summer Walker
- Producers: Rami Dawood; Dos Dias; Slimway

Summer Walker singles chronology
"Pookie's Requiem" (2025)	"Spend It" (2025)	"FMT" (2025)

Music video
- "Spend It" on YouTube

"Spend It" is a song recorded by American singer Summer Walker, released by LVRN and Interscope on May 2, 2025, The song was included on the physical version of her third studio album, Finally Over It.

== Critical reception ==
Devin Morton of HotNewHipHop reviewed the song. Keithan Samuels of Rated R&B reviewed the song.

== Music video ==
The official music video was released on May 5, 2025, starring Blac Chyna, Eric Roberts, Gail Bean, Miracle Watts and Brandee Evans.

== Track listing ==
- Digital download and streaming
1. "Spend It" – 2:45
2. "Spend It" (Diamond and Pearls) – 2:45
3. "Spend It" (Rent is Due Version) – 2:27

== Charts ==
Chart performance for "Spend It"
Chart (2025)	Peak position
Estonia Airplay (TopHit)	89
New Zealand Hot Singles (RMNZ)	32
US Hot R&B/Hip-Hop Songs (Billboard)	30

== Release history ==
Release dates and formats for "Spend It"
Region	Date	Format(s)	Label	Ref.
Various	May 2, 2025	Digital download; streaming	LVRN; Interscope	
