= Face Card =

2026 song by Skilla Baby featuring Chris Brown and Bryson Tiller

Single by Skilla Baby featuring Chris Brown and Bryson Tiller

from the album The Price of Fame
- Released: June 19, 2026
- Recorded: 2026
- Genre: R&B; trap
- Length: 2:38
- Label: Geffen Records
- Songwriters: Trevon Gardner; Christopher Brown; Bryson Tiller; Christian Ward; Malachi Haden; Christopher Dotson; Keyon Maximilian McFarlin; Kayden Davis
- Producers: Hitmaka; Aye YB; MacShooter

Skilla Baby singles chronology
"GYSM" (2026)	"Face Card" (2026)	"Show Me Love" (2026)

Chris Brown singles chronology
"Fallin'" (2026)	"Face Card" (2026)

Bryson Tiller singles chronology
"Drop the Lo" (2026)	"Face Card" (2026)	"Temptation" (2026)

Audio video
- "Face Card" on YouTube

"Face Card" is a song by American rapper Skilla Baby, featuring American R&B singers Chris Brown and Bryson Tiller. It was released on June 19, 2026, through Geffen Records. The song was later included on Skilla Baby's debut studio album The Price of Fame, released on August 21, 2026.

== Remix ==
On November 11, 2026, Skilla Baby released an official remix of "Face Card" featuring additional vocals from American singer Summer Walker, alongside newly recorded vocals by Skilla Baby and the original vocals by Chris Brown and Bryson Tiller.

== Charts ==
Chart performance for "Face Card"
Chart (2026)	Peak position
New Zealand Hot Singles (RMNZ)	28
US Bubbling Under Hot 100 (Billboard)	1
US Hot R&B/Hip-Hop Songs (Billboard)	25
US R&B/Hip-Hop Airplay (Billboard)	20
US Rhythmic Airplay (Billboard)	18
