= Sailorr =

American singer and songwriter

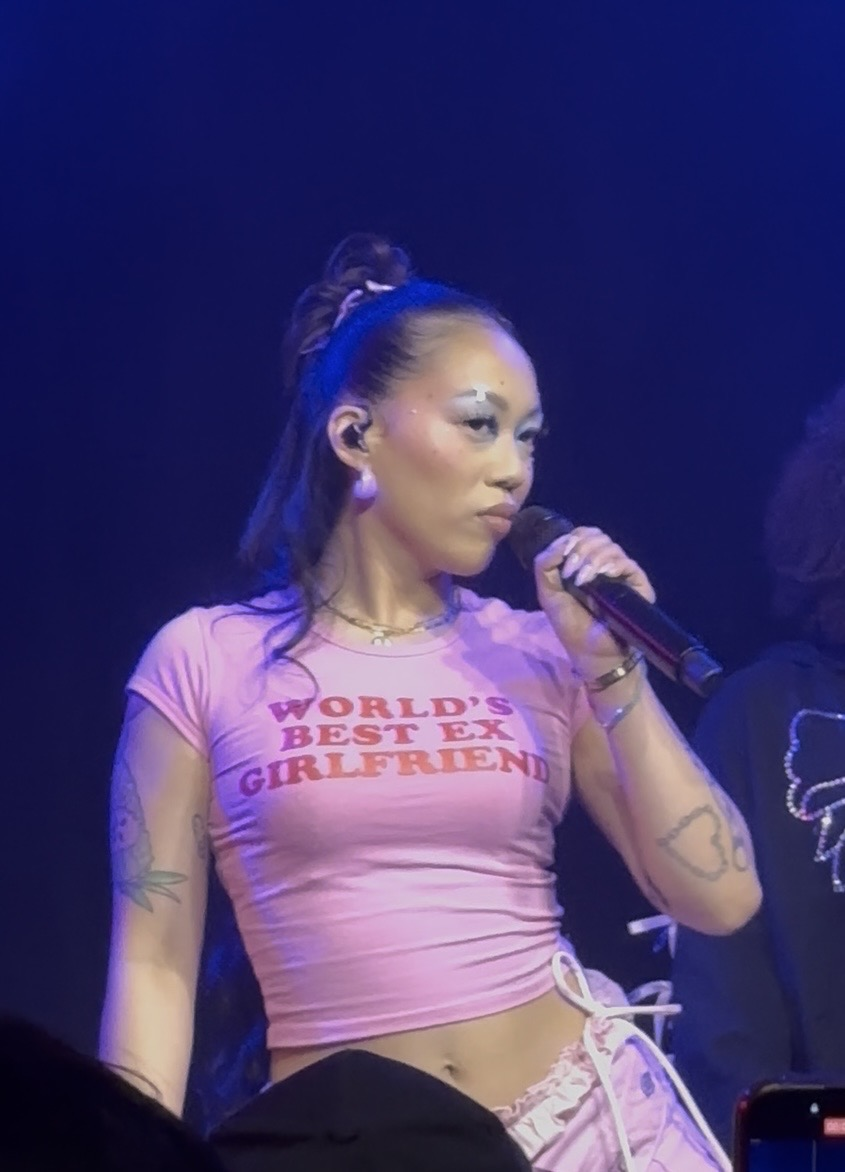
- Sailorr performing in June 2025

Background information
- Also known as: Sailor Goon
- Born: December 7, 1998 (age 27); Jacksonville, Florida, U.S.
- Genres: Alternative R&B
- Occupation: Singer
- Years active: 2019–present
- Labels: BuVision; Atlantic; 10K Projects

Kayla Le (born December 7, 1998) known professionally as Sailorr (stylized in all caps), is an American singer and songwriter. She is known for her major-label debut single, "Pookie's Requiem", which peaked at number 8 on the Bubbling Under Hot 100. Her debut mixtape From Florida's Finest was released on May 9, 2025. Grammy named her one of the "10 rising artists making R&B more diverse and experimental than ever."

== Early life ==
Kayla Le was born and raised in Jacksonville, Florida. Her parents are immigrants of Vietnam, and she has one sister. While in high school, she performed musical theater, originally aiming to become a Broadway performer. Later in high school, she decided to produce her own music, using tools including the Roland SP-404, Fruity Loops, and Ableton. Prior to musical career, she worked as a florist and eyelash technician to support herself after declining admission into The Theatre School at DePaul University.

== Name ==
Sailorr first released music under the stage name "Sailor Goon," inspired by the Sailor Moon franchise, later shortening the name. Her stage name "Sailorr" is a reference to her family and other Vietnamese refugees fleeing from the Vietnam War by boat.

== Musical career ==
Sailorr began releasing music through SoundCloud. She released the track "Persian Rugs" in 2021 at age 21. She released her first single, "Weathered", in December 2023.

In 2024, Sailorr signed to record executive Bu Thiam's record label BuVision after Thiam heard a snippet of "Will U Lie?" on TikTok. In April, Sailorr made two appearances on producer Nascent's second album Don't Grow Up Too Soon, featuring on the songs "Run Me Back My Bread" and "Mangosteen". Seven months later, in November, she released "Pookie's Requiem", her first single under the stage name Sailorr and first single under BuVision. The single was later was remixed with an appearance from Summer Walker. The single "Will U Lie?" was released officially in December, followed by the single "Cut Up" in February, 2025. Sailorr released two more singles, "Down Bad" and "Sincerity", before releasing her debut mixtape From Florida's Finest on May 9, 2025. The mixtape was included in Billboard's The 50 Best Albums of 2025 So Far. She embarked on her first headlining tour in June 2025, with a final stop on video game platform Roblox.

In October 2025, Sailorr featured on Jordan Ward's single "Smokin Potna", towards his album Backwards. She featured on Summer Walker's album Finally Over It on the song "How Sway", released on November 14, 2025. On November 21, 2025, she released the single "Locked In" towards the deluxe version of her debut mixtape. The deluxe version, titled From Florida's Finest Delu/xxx [For My Delusional Ex] was released on December 5, 2025.

== Artistry and image ==
Lauryn Hill, Erykah Badu, André 3000, Frank Ocean, Homeshake, and Chief Keef are musical influences on Sailorr.

Sailorr is known for featuring her Vietnamese heritage in her public appearances. She often wears black grills as a reference to nhuộm răng đen, a Vietnamese teeth blackening tradition. She wore an ao dai during a 2025 Genius performance.

Her “On The Block” video attracted criticism from some viewers who questioned her use of black grills and AAVE as potentially appropriative. Sailorr responded to the criticism by describing her approach to R&B and hip-hop as a way of paying homage to the artists who influenced her.

== Personal life ==
In January 2025, Sailorr moved to Los Angeles to pursue her music career. Sailorr identifies as queer.

== Discography ==
=== Mixtapes ===
| Title | Details | Peak chart positions |
| Title | Details | AUS Hip Hop/R&B |
|---|---|---|
| From Florida's Finest | Released: May 9, 2025; Label: BuVision; Formats: CD, vinyl, digital download, streaming | 20 |

=== Singles ===
==== As lead artist ====
List of singles, showing year released, chart positions, and name of the album
| Title | Year | Peak chart positions | | | | Album |
| Title | Year | US Bub. | US R&B/HH | US R&B | NZ Hot | Album |
|---|---|---|---|---|---|---|
| "Weathered" | 2023 | — | — | — | — | Non-album single |
| "Pookie's Requiem" (solo or remix with Summer Walker) | 2024 | 8 | 33 | 10 | 30 | From Florida's Finest |
| "Will U Lie?" | 2024 | — | — | — | — | From Florida's Finest |
| "Cut Up" | 2025 | — | — | — | — | From Florida's Finest |
| "Down Bad" | 2025 | — | — | — | — | From Florida's Finest |
| "Sincerity" | 2025 | — | — | — | — | From Florida's Finest |
| "Locked In" | 2025 | — | — | — | 38 | From Florida's Finest Delu/xxx (For My Delusional Ex) |
| "Coconut" (featuring Eem Triplin) | 2026 | — | 41 | 8 | — | From Florida's Finest Delu/xxx (For My Delusional Ex) |

==== As featured artist ====
List of singles as featured artist, showing year released and name of the album
| Title | Year | Album |
|---|---|---|
| "Smokin Potna" Jordan Ward featuring Sailorr | 2025 | Backward |

=== Guest appearances ===
List of singles as a guest appearance, showing year released and name of the album
| Title | Year | Peak chart positions | | Album |
| Title | Year | US Bub. | US R&B | Album |
|---|---|---|---|---|
| "Run Me Back My Bread" Nascent featuring Childish Major and Sailorr | 2024 | — | — | Don't Grow Up Too Soon |
| "Mangosteen" Nascent featuring Sailorr and Biako | 2024 | — | — | Don't Grow Up Too Soon |
| "How Sway" Summer Walker with Sailorr | 2025 | 10 | 17 | Finally Over It |

=== Other charted songs ===
List of other charted songs, showing year released, chart positions, and name of the album
| Title | Year | Peak chart positions | Album |
| Title | Year | NZ Hot | Album |
|---|---|---|---|
| "Duvet" | 2025 | 30 | From Florida's Finest Delu/xxx (For My Delusional Ex) |

== Accolades ==
Sailorr was listed as one of 10 Jacksonville artists to watch in 2022 by the Jacksonville Music Experience.

Sailorr was named Billboard's R&B Rookie of the Month for February 2025.

=== Awards and nominations ===
| Award Ceremony | Year | Category | Result | Ref. |
|---|---|---|---|---|
| iHeartRadio Music Awards | 2026 | Best New R&B | Nominated | |

=== Listicles ===
Name of publisher, year listed, name of listicle, and placement
| Publisher | Year | Listicle | Placement | Ref. |
|---|---|---|---|---|
| Billboard | 2025 | 15 Hip-Hop, African & R&B Artists to Watch in 2025 | Placed | |
| Clash | 2025 | 15 R&B Artists To Watch In 2025 | Placed | |
| NME | 2025 | 100 Essential Emerging Artists for 2025 | Placed | |
