= Pookie's Requiem =

2024 single by Sailorr

Single by Sailorr

from the album From Florida's Finest
- Released: November 7, 2024
- Genre: R&B; hip-hop
- Label: BuVision
- Songwriters: Sailorr; Adam Krevlin; Jack Dine; Zachary Ezickson; Mino Drerup
- Producers: Ezzy; Adam Krevlin; Jack Dine; Saint Mino

Sailorr singles chronology
| "Weathered" (2023) | "Pookie's Requiem" (2024) | "W1LL U L13?" (2024) |

Music video
- "Pookie's Requiem" on YouTube

"Pookie's Requiem" is the major label debut song by American singer Sailorr, released on November 7, 2024, as the first single from her debut mixtape From Florida's Finest. A remix of the song featuring Summer Walker was released on January 24, 2025.

The single peaked at number eight on the US Billboard Bubbling Under Hot 100 chart and number ten on the Billboard Hot R&B Songs chart.

== Background and composition ==
In 2024, after posting snippets of her then unreleased music on TikTok, record executive Bu Thiam signed Sailorr to his label BuVision, which was merged with Atlantic Music Group in March 2025. In November, Sailorr released "Pookie's Requiem", her first song under the major label and the first song using the stage name Sailorr.

Called both a "breakup anthem" and "crash-out anthem", "Pookie's Requiem" is an R&B song with elements of hip-hop and musical theatre. Sailorr originally wrote the song as a diss track about her ex she "didn't think anybody was going to hear". She stated recording the song was "an opportunity to say my last piece to my ex after we went fully no contact" and that the song was both a "cry for help" and her reclaiming her time and energy from the relationship. Sailorr noted the movie Requiem for a Dream as inspiration for the song, stating the film "represents addiction" and that she felt she was addicted to her previous relationship even while she believed it was going nowhere.

After meeting Summer Walker in a studio in Los Angeles, Sailorr decided to invite Walker on a remix of the track. The remix, titled "Pookie's Requiem [Hehe Look Y'all I Made It Longer]", was released on January 24, 2025.

== Promotion ==
In April 2025, Sailorr performed "Pookie's Requiem" as a guest appearance during 4Batz's set at Coachella.

== Critical reception ==
Jessica Rogers of Clash magazine called "Pookie's Requiem" a standout track of her debut mixtape From Florida's Finest. Solomon Pace-McCarrick of Dazed praised Sailorr's storytelling ability and referred to the song as "incredibly addictive" and "a glorious crash out". Ivan Guzman of Paper magazine called the song a "refreshing sprout of relatable bitterness" and commended the remix featuring Summer Walker, stating the two singers "mix well together".

== Commercial performance ==
The song debuted and peaked at number eight on the Billboard Bubbling Under Hot 100 chart on the week of February 8, 2025, Sailorr's first song on the chart.

The song also entered the Billboard Hot R&B Songs chart at number 21 on the week of November 30, 2024 and peaked at number ten on the week of February 8, 2025.

== Music video ==
A music video was released for the remix of the song featuring Summer Walker. The video depicts Sailorr trashing her ex's house while Walker acts as a lookout. Sailorr stated working with Walker for the music video was the "biggest pinch me moment of her career so far".

== Charts ==
Weekly chart performance for "Pookie's Requiem"
| Chart (2024–2025) | Peak position |
|---|---|
| US Bubbling Under Hot 100 (Billboard) | 8 |
| US Hot R&B/Hip-Hop Songs (Billboard) | 33 |
