= City Charter High School =

- 201 Stanwix St. Suite 100, Pittsburgh, PA 15222

Information
- Type: Charter
- Motto: High School at Life Speed
- Established: 2002
- Grades: 9–12
- Colors: Red and Gray
- Mascot: Gargoyle
- Founders: Mario Zinga, Richard Wertheimer
- Chief Executive Officer: Dara Ware Allen
- Education Manager: Angela Welch
- Website: High

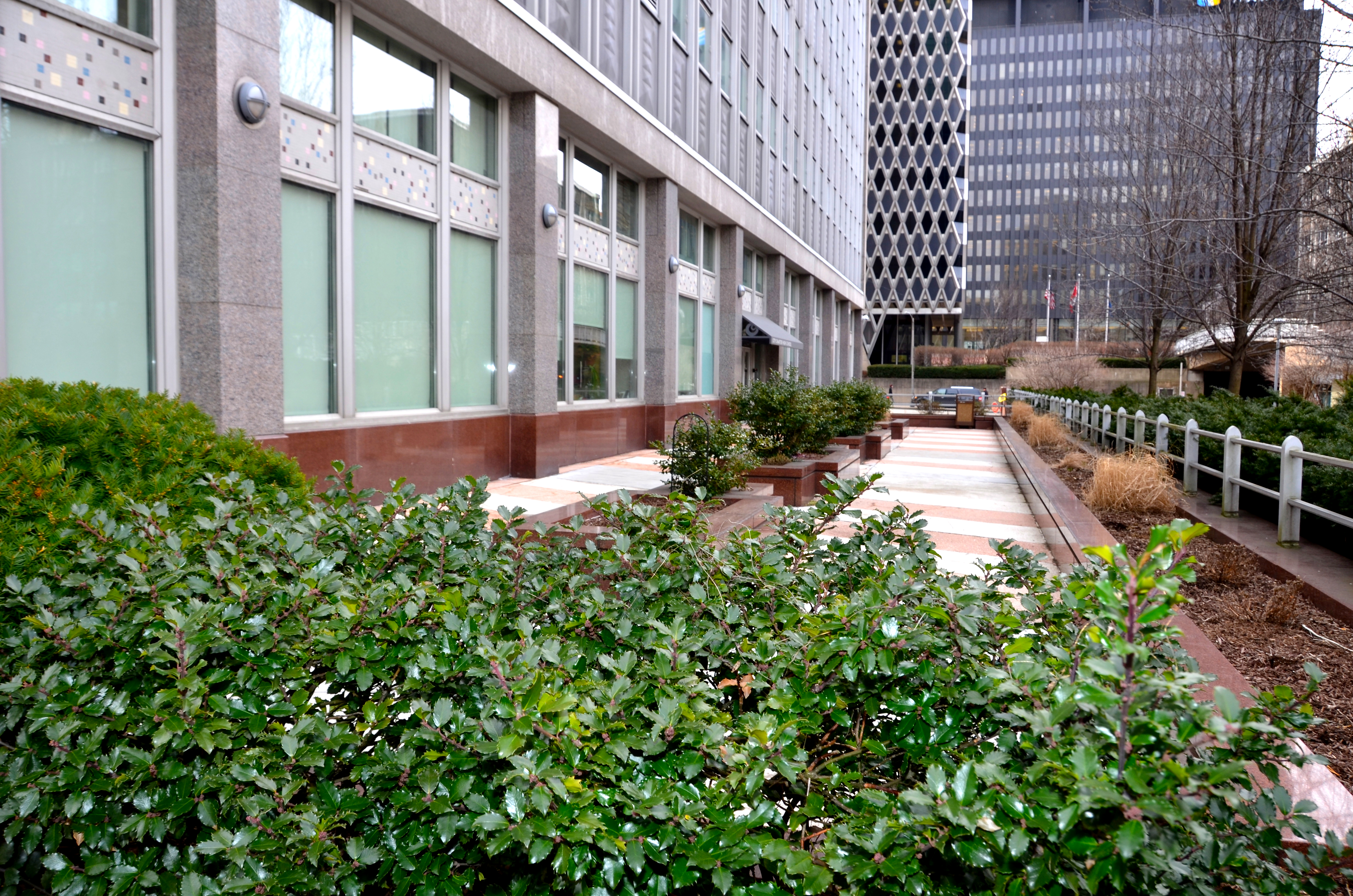

City Charter High School, commonly referred to as City High, is a charter high school operating on a year-round schedule. Located in Pittsburgh, Pennsylvania, United States, the school provides education for students in grades 9 through 12. It was founded in September 2002 by Dr. Richard Wertheimer and Mario Zinga.

The school's academic program is characterized by its integration of technology into the academic curriculum and focus on college and career readiness. City High operates under EDSYS, Inc., a non-profit educational organization.

== History ==
On February 27, 2002, the Pittsburgh Board of Education voted 6–2 (with one abstention) to approve an application for a five-year charter for City Charter High School contingent on it submitting a plan for educating students, showing it can measure student progress, and 4 other conditions. In March 2003 the board was told by district administrators that the charter school had met these conditions, however the board then failed to approve the charter in a 4–3 vote (with two abstentions). Approval of new charters requires five affirmatives. After hearing arguments a Common Pleas judge ordered the board to approve the charter, despite the board's opposition.

City High opened its doors on September 3, 2002. On June 24, 2006, the school's first graduating class held its commencement ceremonies at Soldiers & Sailors Memorial Hall in Oakland. The theme of the event was "Breakaway", from the hit Kelly Clarkson song. Graduated seniors have gone on to college careers at schools ranging from Robert Morris, Pitt, Carlow University, and Duquesne to the University of North Carolina, the University of Chicago, Penn State, Neumont University, and York University.

As part of the ten year anniversary of the school, City High was looking to further develop aspects of its mission. In 2012, the school moved to its current location of 201 Stanwix Street.

The most recent renewal of the school’s charter was in 2022, coinciding with the school’s twentieth anniversary.

=== Founders ===
==== Richard Wertheimer ====
Richard Wertheimer is a public school educator whose expertise is in mathematics, technology, school reform, curriculum, and staff development. As Coordinator of Instructional Technology, he managed the instructional component of the Pittsburgh Public Schools $25 million Technology Plan (1998–2001). Projects that he has managed include Common Knowledge: Pittsburgh (1993–1998). He was the secondary mathematics supervisor for the Pittsburgh Public Schools from 1988 to 1993. He taught mathematics at Brashear, Peabody and Upper St. Clair High Schools from 1975 to 1988.

==== Mario Zinga ====
Mario Zinga is a public school educator whose expertise is in writing, French, Italian, technology and gifted education. He developed the Common Knowledge: Pittsburgh project, a five-year, $5 million K-12 testbed grant from the National Science Foundation (1993–1998). He taught at East Hills Elementary School and the Pittsburgh Elementary Gifted Center from 1985 to 1993.

Since the retirement of founders Wertheimer and Zinga, City High has been led by two CEOs, Dr. Ron Sofo (2012–2018) and Dr. Dara Ware Allen (2018–present).

== Academics ==
From the charter application: "The school offers a program with students taking four years of Mathematics, Science, English Language Arts, Social Studies and World Languages. Traditional content areas are grouped into four clusters - scientific literacy (Mathematics and Sciences), Cultural Literacy (Reading, Writing, Listening, Speaking, Arts and Humanities, Social Studies, World Languages), Work-skills Literacy (Career Education, Applied, Computer, Multimedia and Networking Technologies) and Wellness Literacy (Health, Safety and Physical Education). An extended school day and year supports project-based learning. Annual standardized assessments require students to articulate their understanding and mastery of a topic orally and in writing."

=== Teaching methods ===
Team teaching: Faculty members do not have individual offices. Instead, each grade's teachers have a joint office. In the hiring of new staff, teachers are allowed to collectively interview candidates. Some classes, particularly career readiness and research courses, are taught by two teachers simultaneously.

Teacher-student continuity: The same group of teachers work with each graduating class through their four years of high school. This allows the teachers to become familiar with students' learning styles, and students become familiar with teachers' styles of teaching. Another benefit is that the teachers, by teaching at a different grade level each year, will not become "burned out" by sheer repetition. When seniors graduate, their teachers start over with the new ninth grade class. Teachers receive a pay increase each time they complete a cycle and elect to start over with a new graduating class.

Staff development: City High teachers do not receive tenure and are not unionized, though they retain that right. They receive a bonus for maintaining perfect or near-perfect attendance—a way of discouraging substitute teachers—and must apply for promotion in order to advance in their careers. There are three levels of teachers: Apprentice, Journeyman, and Master.

"Looping": Teachers "loop," or go through all four grades of high school, with the students. This increases student-teacher relationships and prevents class time being taken away from teachers re-learning students' names every school year.

== Technology ==
Students receive laptop computers. Accessible from school or home, they allow teachers to integrate technology and the internet into the curriculum. Students receive instruction on Adobe Photoshop, submit papers electronically, and can receive certification in any Microsoft Office program. A web application, Edline, tracks all student assignments and is accessible by students and their parents.

== Location ==
The school occupies five floors in the old Verizon Building on Stanwix Street in Downtown Pittsburgh. Because of its placement, City High does not have a traditional school campus or facilities (e.g., a gymnasium). About the location, co-founder Wertheimer said, "This is a perfect location for a career-oriented high school. It is downtown, central to public transportation, businesses, colleges and the cultural district."

City High is the third high school in downtown Pittsburgh; others include Northside Urban Pathways and the Pittsburgh High School for the Creative and Performing Arts (CAPA). It is one of five charter schools in the Pittsburgh area. Other charter schools include Northside Urban Pathways, downtown; Career Connections Charter High School, Lawrenceville; Manchester Academic Charter School, Manchester; and the Urban League of Pittsburgh Charter School, East Liberty.

== Non-traditional schedule ==
City High offers year-round schooling, with one three week vacation (April), One five week vacation (July–August) and one four week vacation(December). The school year begins in August. The school day begins at 8:00 a.m., later than many high schools in the area, to allow travel time for students. For freshmen the school day ends at 3:45 p.m., whereas for sophomores, juniors and seniors, it ends at 3:40 p.m.

== Workforce orientation ==
The school has an orientation toward the workforce and preparation for it. All students go on 13-week internships for which they receive a grade, generally in 11th grade. Some students also take college courses at Community College of Allegheny County in 12th grade.

== FIRST Robotics ==
In 2006, City High's FIRST Robotics team, The Short Circuits, number 1743, won the Pittsburgh Regionals and in April went on to the Nationals in Atlanta, Georgia. Other awards they received at the Pittsburgh Regionals were the Rookie Inspiration Award and the Highest Rookie Seed Award. The team was sponsored by NASA, NOVA Chemicals, Bally Design, and Monte Cello's.

In 2007 the Short Circuits entered the competition again in the Pittsburgh and Cleveland Regionals. At Pittsburgh they won the website award. They did not make the finals at either regional. Their sponsors included NASA, Bally Design, and Singularity Clark.

In 2009 the team entered in only the Pittsburgh competition. Finishing 31st out of 34, the team was chosen by team 222, and 1218 for the top alliance. The teams won the competition, and advanced to nationals. At nationals, the team finished 58th out of 80.

== SAGE - Students for the Advancement of Global Entrepreneurship ==
City Charter High School has one of the few Eastern United States SAGE groups, which was founded in 2009, as well as being one of the few active, urban teams.

SAGE was founded by Dr. Curt DeBerg of California State University – Chico in 2002 with the mission to help create the next generation of entrepreneurial leaders. There are two categories of businesses, Socially Responsible Business and Social Enterprise Business. Socially-Responsible Businesses (SRB) are legally structured as for-profit businesses and create positive change indirectly through the practice of corporate social responsibility including environmentalism and volunteering. A Social Enterprise Business (SEB) can be a for-profit or non-profit enterprise explicitly intending to address a social problem through its products, services, or employees.

City High competed in the SAGE National Competition in Buffalo, New York, in 2010 and Chicago, Illinois, in 2011. In Chicago, City High SAGE was announced as the first selection for the national SAGE – Mitsubishi Electric Foundation – UCLA Tarjan Center "National Inclusion Grant." Additionally, City High took first place honors in the SAGE National "Inclusion Logo Competition." Subsequent to an excellent showing in Chicago, City High SAGE was invited to assist the SAGE Staff with the Global Competition in Buffalo, New York with twenty-two countries competing.

City High SAGE participated in the tenth annual National SAGE Competition. This national competition was held May 25 – 27, 2012, in San Francisco, California, and there were teams from Texas, Ohio, Arizona, and Washington, as well as areas including Silicon Valley and Berkeley in California. This is the first time City High progressed to the finals and subsequently won second place in the Social Enterprise Business. City High SAGE was sponsored by Gateway Financial, as well as Pitt Ohio Express, Heffren-Tillotson, and American Eagle Outfitters.

SAGE is open to all City High students and has active members at every grade level. Students create and operate businesses, take care of accounting, marketing and public relations, and community outreach. City High SAGE students are involved in the school and volunteer broadly in the local community, in addition to their entrepreneurial endeavors.
