= From Florida's Finest =

Mixtape by Sailorr
- Released: May 9, 2025
- Genre: R&B
- Length: 30:31
- Label: BuVision
- Producers: Adam Krevlin; Anoop D'Souza; DJYawning; Emile Haynie; Jack Dine; Jack Ezzy; Jack Hogan; Julián Dysart; Lido; Saint Mino; TY Jake; Teo Halm

Singles from From Florida's Finest
- 1. "Pookie's Requiem" Released: November 7, 2024; 2. "Will U Lie?" Released: December 13, 2024; 3. "Cut Up" Released: February 13, 2025; 4. "Down Bad" Released: April 4, 2025; 5. "Sincerity" Released: April 25, 2025

Singles from From Florida's Finest Delu/xxx [For My Delusional Ex]
- 1. "Locked In" Released: November 25, 2025; 2. "Coconut" Released: March 23, 2026

Professional ratings
Review scores
Source	Rating
Clash	8/10
NME	4/5 stars

From Florida's Finest is the debut mixtape by Vietnamese-American singer-songwriter Sailorr. It was released by Atlantic Music Group label BuVision on May 9, 2025, and contains 14 tracks, including lead single "Pookie's Requiem".

== Background and release ==
Sailorr released the lead single of the mixtape, "Pookie's Requiem", in November 2024. She then released the singles "Will U Lie?" in December and "Cut Up" in February 2025. The fourth single, "Down Bad", was released on April 4, 2025. On April 25, Sailorr released the mixtape's final single "Sincerity", along with an album announcement. The album From Florida's Finest was released on May 9, along with a music video for the track "Bitches Brew".

On November 21, Sailorr announced a deluxe version of the mixtape, titled From Florida's Finest Delu/xxx [For My Delusional Ex], coinciding with the release of her single "Locked In". The deluxe version was released on December 5.

== Artwork ==
The cover artwork is inspired by the Animorphs book series' covers and The Metamorphosis by Franz Kafka. Sailorr chose a roach specifically as a reference to her home state of Florida and her love for smoking roaches, reflecting the mixtape's theme of staying true to herself. She also stated her Roblox avatar "has always been a roach with a tiara on it".

== Promotion ==
Soon after the release of her mixtape, Sailorr announced a United States and United Kingdom tour beginning in June 2025 until July. On July 19, the "final stop" of the tour took place on a virtual stage in the popular video game platform Roblox.

On March 9, 2026, Sailorr and Eem Triplin released the music video for their collaboration "Coconut".

== Reception ==
Kyann-Sian Williams of NME gave the mixtape four out of five stars, calling Sailorr a "lyrical heavyweight" and opining the "ability to cry one moment and crack up the next defines 'From Florida's Finest' ".

Jessica Rogers of Clash gave the mixtape a rating of 8/10, stating the mixtape is "a peek into the world of SAILORR, with her imaginative storytelling voyaging the listener through the full breadth of her daydreams, insecurities and intrusive thoughts". Williams also opined the mixtape is uniquely Sailorr's in "both sound and lyricism". Jon Caramanica of The New York Times described the album as "inventively bawdy, psychologically intricate, friskily sung, unflashily catchy."

=== Accolades ===
Publication	Accolade	Rank	Ref.
Billboard	The 50 Best Albums of 2025 So Far (Staff Picks)	Placed	
The New York Times	Best Albums of 2025	12	

== Track listing ==
From Florida's Finest track listing
No.	Title	Writer(s)	Producer(s)	Length
1.	"Soft Girl Summer"	Sailorr; Billy Walsh; Jack Rochon; Shaan Ramaprasad	Jack Ezzy; Jack Hogan; Adam Krevlin	2:32
2.	"Sincerity"	Sailorr; Krevlin; Emile Haynie; Ezzy	Ezzy; Haynie; Krevlin	2:47
3.	"Grrl's Grrl"	Sailorr; Starrah; Teo Halm	Ezzy; Krevlin	2:19
4.	"Bitches Brew"	Sailorr	Ezzy; Krevlin; Anoop D'Souza; Jack Dine	2:31
5.	"Gimme Dat Lug Nut"	Sailorr; Beryl Chen	Ezzy; Krevlin	0:37
6.	"Down Bad"	Sailorr; Krevlin; Zachary Ezickson	Ezzy; Krevlin	2:12
7.	"Pookie's Requiem"	Sailorr; Krevlin; Dine; Ezickson; Mino Drerup	Ezzy; Krevlin; Dine; Saint Mino	1:48
8.	"Done Shaving 4 U"	Sailorr	Ezzy; Krevlin; Dine; Lido	1:59
9.	"Itadakimasu"	Sailorr; Ramaprasad	Ezzy; Krevlin; Julián Dysart	2:14
10.	"MSG"	Sailorr	Ezzy; Krevlin	0:54
11.	"Belly"	Sailorr; Tayla Parks	Ezzy; Krevlin; Berg	2:30
12.	"Ur Mother's Son"	Sailorr; Ramaprasad	Ezzy; Krevlin; D'Souza; Hogan; Dysart	2:46
13.	"Cut Up"	Sailorr; Krevlin; Hogan; Ezickson	Ezzy; Krevlin; TY Jake	2:56
14.	"Will U Lie?"	Sailorr; Krevlin; Dine; Halm; Ezickson	Ezzy; Krevlin; Dine; Halm; DJYawning	2:19
Total length:				30:31

From Florida's Finest Delu/xxx [For My Delusional Ex] additional track listing
No.	Title	Writer(s)	Producer(s)	Length
1.	"Locked In"	Sailorr; D'Souza; Krevlin; Dine; Lido; Ezzy	Ezzy; Lido; Krevlin	2:11
2.	"Coconut" (with Eem Triplin)	Sailorr; Triplin; Krevlin; Halm; Ezzy	Ezzy; Halm; Krevlin; Lido^{[a]}	2:36
3.	"Duvet"	Sailorr; Ezzy; Krevlin; Dine	Ezzy; Dine; Krevlin	2:31
4.	"Rent Free"	Sailorr; Krevlin; Ezzy	Ezzy; Krevlin	2:22
19.	"Pookie's Requiem (Hehe Look Y'all I Made It Longer)" (with Summer Walker)	Sailorr; Walker; Krevlin; Dine; Ezzy; Drerup	Ezzy; Krevlin; Dine; Mino	2:53
Total length:				43:00

Notes

- ^{^[a]} indicates an additional producer
- "Will U Lie?" is stylized as "W1LL U L13?"

== Personnel ==
Credits adapted from Qobuz.

- Shaan Ramaprasad – additional vocals (tracks 1, 9, 12)
- Beryl Chen – additional vocals (track 5)
- Asha Imuno – additional vocals (track 10)
- Austin Lichtenstein – additional vocals (track 11)
- Jeremy Stern – additional vocals (track 11)
- Jon Castelli – mixing (tracks 1–6, 8–13, "Coconut", "Rent Free")
- Sailorr – mixing (tracks 7, 19, "Locked In"), mastering (tracks 7, 19, "Locked In")
- Adam Krevlin – mixing (track 14, "Duvet")
- Zach Ezzy – mixing (track 14, "Duvet")
- Dale Becker – mastering (tracks 1–6, 8–13, "Coconut", "Duvet", "Rent Free")
- Joshua Pleeter – mastering (track 14)

== Charts ==
Chart performance for From Florida's Finest
Chart (2025)	Peak position
Australian Hip Hop/R&B Albums (ARIA)	20
