= Skilla Baby =

American rapper (born 1998)

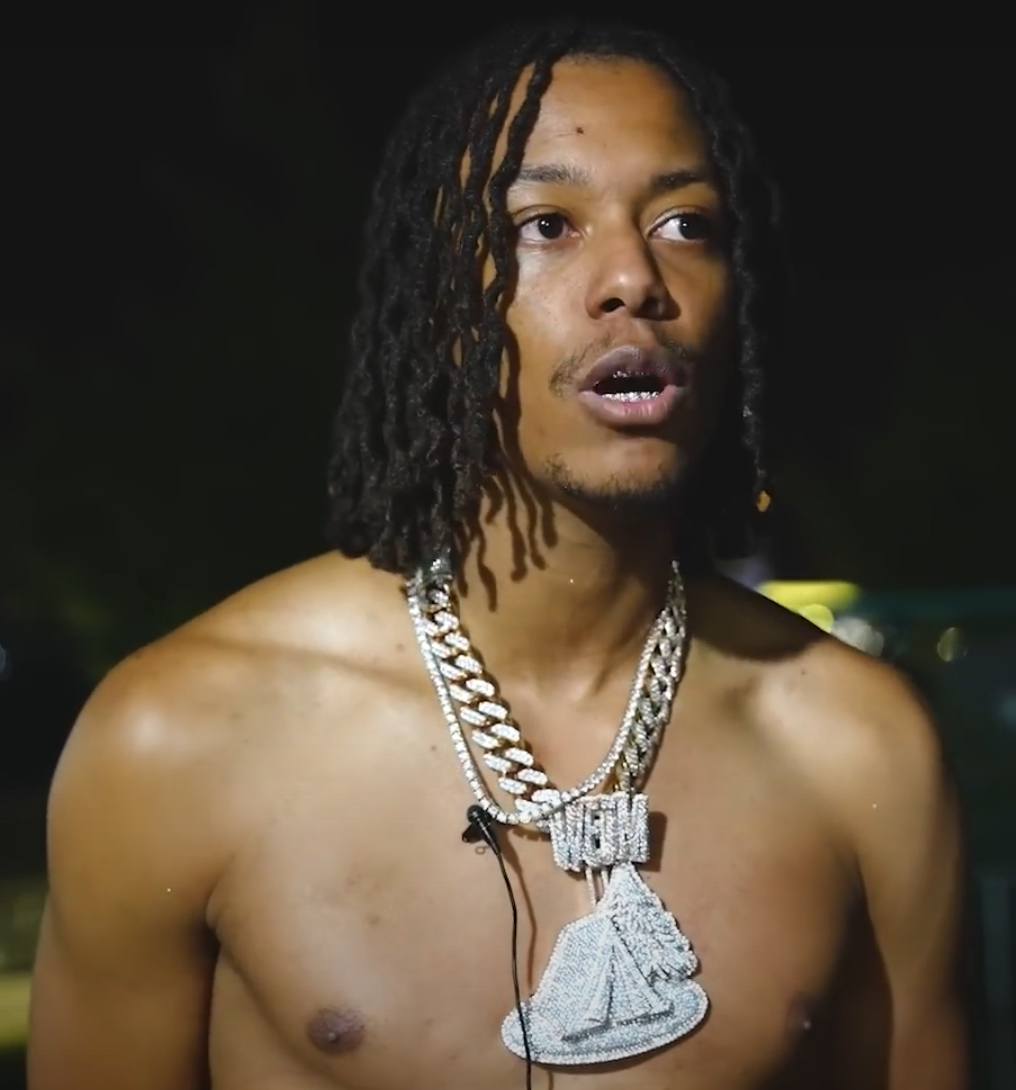
- Skilla Baby in 2024

Background information
- Born: Trevon Gardner; October 2, 1998 (age 28); Detroit, Michigan, U.S.
- Genres: Michigan rap, trap
- Occupation: Rapper
- Instrument: Vocals
- Years active: 2015–present
- Label: Geffen
- Website: www.officialskillababy.com

Trevon Gardner (born October 2, 1998), known professionally as Skilla Baby, is an American rapper from Detroit, Michigan.

== Early life and career ==
Skilla Baby, born Trevon Gardner, developed an early interest in writing when he was a child. His first significant motivation came from memorizing Langston Hughes' poem "Mother to Son" in fifth grade. His musical taste was greatly influenced by his father, who exposed him to a wide range of music from Luther Vandross to Lil Wayne. Gardner's father grew up during the Motown era, sharing stories about places like the Graystone Ballroom where Motown singers performed, and always surrounded Skilla with music.

Due to behavioral issues, Gardner attended several high schools before settling at Oak Park High School. Initially passionate about basketball, he earned the nickname "Skillz" for his prowess on the court. However, his life changed dramatically when his father died when Skilla was 15 years old. After deciding against college due to a lack of basketball offers and his desire to make money, Skilla shifted his focus to music. He worked various jobs, including at McDonald's and Walmart, to fund his studio time and music production.

His dedication to rap caught the attention of veteran Detroit rapper Sada Baby, which helped him gain significant exposure. Gardner's rap career began in earnest with the release of his mixtape Push That Shit Out Skilla in 2019. His breakout moment came with the 2020 track "Womack," followed by projects like Carmelo Bryant with Sada Baby. In 2022, he released his major label debut, We Eat The Most, which featured hits like "Icky Vicky Vibes" and "Tay B Style".

Signing to Geffen in 2022, Skilla's 2023 releases include Controversy, a collaboration with Tee Grizzley, and his solo album We Eat the Most, which debuted at No. 16 on the Heatseekers Albums chart. He also opened for Travis Scott on the Circus Maximus Tour and joined Lil Tjay's Beat The Odds Tour. Skilla's career received a significant boost when Jack Harlow mentioned him in the song "Lovin on Me". The Detroit-based rapper entered Billboard's charts for the first time with his LP We Eat the Most. Released on June 16, 2022, through Geffen Records/IGA, the album debuted at No. 16 on the Heatseekers Albums chart with 3,000 copies sold.

In April 2024, Gardner released The Coldest, a 19-track project, that features collaborations with Rob49, DaBaby, Moneybagg Yo, Flo Milli, and Polo G, among others. "The pressure of being a new artist, being successful, staying disciplined, and still clocking into the studio is very strenuous. But fun at the same time," Gardner shared about his journey and the making of The Coldest. Bfb Da Packman's upcoming album Forget Me Not, announced via social media on March 25, 2024, features Gardner alongside notable artists such as Drake, and other Michigan rap natives, such as DDG, Icewear Vezzo, and Rio da Yung OG.

BET Music named Gardner the BET Amplified artist for April 2024, recognizing him as a burgeoning talent poised for significant impact in the industry. Additionally, Gardner is featured on Yung Miami's upcoming single "CFWM", set to drop on April 10, 2024. The cover for the Skilla Baby-assisted record was revealed on April 8, 2024. Rob49 and Gardner announced their co-headling tour "Vultures Eat The Most Tour" on April 17, 2024, slated to kick off on May 30 at the Level 13 Event Center in Orlando, Florida.

In 2026 he released the single "Face Card", featuring Chris Brown and Bryson Tiller.

== Style and influences ==
"I ain't gon lie, everybody that come to my shows be like, 'Yo front row is full of girls!' I thought that's how everybody's front row look. I don't know where that came from though. I don't get that part, I just be living my regular life."

— Skilla Baby, regarding his largely female fanbase.

Gardner's music is inspired by the sounds of rappers like Meek Mill and Lil Wayne, as well as vintage soul and RandB from his father's record collection and even the poetry and literature that came out of the Harlem Renaissance. He describes his style as unorthodox and diverse, making music based on his feelings and experiences. Known for his smooth tone and women-empowering lyrics, Skilla's fanbase includes a significant number of female listeners. He credits his upbringing around strong Black women for his respectful and admiring approach to women in his music.

According to Rap-Up, Gardner was named #9 of Rappers to Watch in 2024, noted for his "smooth tone and women-empowering lyrics that still maintain his bravado". Tracks like "Bae" and his feature on Dess Dior's "Leave Her Alone" have made him a favorite among female listeners. Nonetheless, during an interview with Angela Yee's Lip Service, Gardner addressed a viral video of him stopping a concert in Milwaukee after a male fan began rubbing his chest. Gardner explained that while his friends find it amusing that fans touch him, he is not entertained by such acts, which occur during every show. "I had a girl stick her whole hand in my pants," he revealed.

== Activism ==
In February 2024, Gardner partnered with City Council President Mary Sheffield and Judge Tenisha Yancey for a gun buyback event and expungement fair in Detroit. The event aimed to reduce gun violence and assist those with criminal records in finding employment. Gardner emphasized the importance of the initiative: "This will not be the last one. We will try to get as many guns off the streets and clean as many records as possible every year if it's up to me".

== Personal life ==
Gardner has been involved in settling disputes within the Detroit rap community, notably helping to reconcile differences between Tee Grizzley and Sada Baby. He also faced an altercation in October 2023 but maintained that the incident did not harm his reputation, Gardner stating, "This is how not gangsta y'all n-ggas is. Y'all walk up on a n-gga while he with a pregnant lady and some kids, man. Then, y'all walk up on me tryin' to go [on Instagram] live, man. Stop doin' that shit. That live shit is police shit, man".

On May 22, 2025, in Redford, Michigan, Gardner was shot three times in a drive-by shooting and crashed his SUV into a building. Gardner was taken to the hospital, and is expected to make a full recovery. Police arrested the primary suspect on June 6.
