= Love Renaissance =

American record label and management company

- Parent company: Sony Music Entertainment
- Founded: 2012
- Founder: Carlon Ramong; Justice Baiden; Junia Abaidoo; Sean Famoso McNichol; Tunde Balogun
- Distributor: The Orchard
- Genre: R&B; hip-hop; pop
- Country of origin: United States
- Location: Atlanta, Georgia

Love Renaissance (LVRN) is an American record label and management company founded by Carlon Ramong, Justice Baiden, Junia Abaidoo, Sean Famoso McNichol and Tunde Balogun, and based in Atlanta, Georgia. The label is currently distributed through The Orchard, a unit of Sony Music. The label currently houses artists Odeal, 6lack, Summer Walker, BRS Kash, Alex Vaughn, Eli Derby, the South African duo TxC, Ciza and North Ave Jax. LVRN manages artists Shelley FKA DRAM, Westside Boogie, Dvsn, Davido, and Spinall.

== History ==
Love Renaissance (LVRN) was founded in 2012 by rival party promoters Carlon Ramong, Justice Baiden, Junia Abaidoo, Sean Famoso McNichol, and Tunde Balogun while students at Georgia State University. The agency specializes in talent management, creative direction, and production, as well as marketing and strategic partnerships. The first artist under the label was a singer-songwriter, Raury. In 2016, they added two more artists, DRAM and 6lack, to their roster.

On July 14, 2017, the label signed a distribution deal with Interscope Records, and launched a creative space studio in Atlanta called LVRN Studios. Sean Famoso said "This launch is another example of the power and influence of Atlanta's youth in the industry and culture. This studio and creative space belongs to the rest of the city as much as it does us. We want to make sure this place serves as a reminder nobody should have to travel across the country to Los Angeles or New York to get started on their dream." Tunde Balogun spoke with Billboard saying "What we're doing isn't a flash in the pan - it's about developing artists for the long run, that's Interscope's goal as well. That's why this works." On January 8, 2018, Raury left the label to become an independent artist.

In 2019 and 2020, the label signed artists Cruel Santino, Kitty Ca$h, OMB Bloodbath, Eli Derby, Young Rog, and BRS Kash. The latter's signing was pushed by his hit single, "Throat Baby (Go Baby)". On November 16, 2020, the label released their first compilation album titled Home for the Holidays, featuring the LVRN roster. In February 2021, the label entered into a publishing partnership with Warner Chappell, including the new signing of GMK, and Genio Bambino. On April 27, 2021, LVRN announced the management signing of R&B duo Dvsn. On May 5, LVRN released a hip-hop cypher with Spotify, introducing Cleveland rapper NoonieVsEverybody to the label.

== Roster ==
=== Current artists ===
Act	Year signed	Releases under the label
6lack	2016	4
Summer Walker	2017	6
Young Rog	2018	1
BRS Kash	2020	1
OMB Bloodbath	2020	–
Kitty Ca$h	2020	–
Eli Derby	2020	1
NoonieVsEverybody	2021	–
Alex Vaughn	2021	1
GMK	2021	–
Genio Bambino	2021	–
North Ave Jax	2021	1
SadBoi	2023	–
Tanner Adell	2024	–
Odeal	2024	1
Belly Gang Kushington	2024	1

=== Management ===
Act	Year signed	Label
Shelley FKA DRAM	2016	Atlantic Records
Westside Boogie	2017	Shady Records
Cruel Santino	2019	Monster Boy
Dvsn	2021	OVO Sound
Davido	2022	
Spinall	2022	
Baby Tate	2022	Warner

=== Former artists ===
Act	Years on the label	Releases under the label
Raury	2012–18	2
Äyanna	2022-25	1

== Discography ==
=== Studio albums ===
Artist	Album	Details
Raury	All We Need	Released: October 16, 2015; Label: LVRN, Columbia; Formats: CD, LP, digital download
6lack	Free 6lack	Released: November 18, 2016; Label: LVRN, Interscope; Formats: CD, digital download, LP
6lack	East Atlanta Love Letter	Released: September 14, 2018; Label: LVRN, Interscope; Formats: CD, digital download, LP
Summer Walker	Over It	Released: October 4, 2019; Label: LVRN, Interscope; Formats: CD, digital download, LP
Summer Walker	Still Over It	Released: November 5, 2021; Label: LVRN, Interscope; Formats: CD, digital download, LP
6lack	Since I Have a Lover	Released: March 24, 2023; Label: LVRN, Interscope; Format: CD, vinyl, digital download, streaming
Belly Gang Kushington	The Streets is Yours	Released: April 25, 2025; Labels: LVRN; Formats: digital download, streaming
Summer Walker	Finally Over It	Released: November 14, 2025; Labels: LVRN, Interscope; Formats: CD, LP, digital download, streaming

=== Compilation albums ===
Artist	Album	Details
LVRN, 6lack, Summer Walker	Home for the Holidays	Released: November 16, 2020; Label: LVRN, Interscope; Formats: Digital download
LVRN, 6lack, Summer Walker	Home for the Holidays, Vol. 2	Released: November 30, 2022; Label: LVRN, Interscope; Formats: Digital download

=== Extended plays ===
Artist	Extended play	Details
Summer Walker	Clear	Released: January 25, 2019; Label: LVRN, Interscope; Format: Digital Download
6lack	6pc Hot EP	Released: June 26, 2020; Label: LVRN, Interscope; Format: Digital Download
Summer Walker	Life on Earth	Released: July 10, 2020; Label: LVRN, Interscope; Format: Digital Download
Alex Vaughn	The Hurtbook	Released: October 7, 2022; Label: LVRN, Interscope; Format: Digital Download
Eli Derby	More Than Friends	Released: October 26, 2022; Label: LVRN, Interscope, The Brain; Format: Digital Download
Summer Walker	Clear 2: Soft Life	Released: May 19, 2023; Label: LVRN, Interscope; Format: Digital download, streaming, CD
Odeal	The Summer that Saved Me	Released: July 11, 2025; Label: OVMBR, LVRN; Format: Digital download, streaming

=== Mixtapes ===
Artist	Mixtape	Details
Raury	Indigo Child	Released: August 25, 2014; Label: Columbia Records; Format: Digital download
Summer Walker	Last Day of Summer	Released: October 12, 2018; Label: LVRN, Interscope; Formats: LP, digital download, streaming
BRS Kash	Kash Only	Released: January 22, 2021; Label: LVRN, Interscope, A Team Litty; Formats: Digital download
Young Rog	Boy Next Door	Released: June 25, 2021; Label: LVRN, Interscope; Formats: Digital download
North Ave Jax	LaZy, but i have goals	Released: November 4, 2022; Label: LVRN, Interscope; Formats: Digital download
