= London on da Track production discography =

The following list is a discography of productions by London on da Track, an American hip hop record producer and recording artist from Atlanta, Georgia. It includes a list of songs produced, co-produced and remixed by year, artist, album and title.

== Singles produced ==
List of singles, with selected chart positions and certifications, showing year released and album name
Title	Year	Peak chart positions			Album
Title	Year	US	US R&B	US Rap	Album
"Hookah" (Tyga featuring Young Thug)	2014	85	25	19	Non-album single
"About the Money" (T.I. featuring Young Thug)	2014	42	12	10	Paperwork
"Lifestyle" (Rich Gang featuring Young Thug and Rich Homie Quan)	2014	16	4	4	Non-album singles
"Take Kare" (Rich Gang featuring Young Thug and Lil Wayne)	2014	—	—	—	Non-album singles
"Sho Me Love" (Rich Gang featuring Juvenile)	2014	—	—	—	Non-album singles
"Check" (Young Thug)	2015	100	30	—	Barter 6
"Sneakin'" (Drake featuring 21 Savage)	2016	28	8	7	Non-album single
"Roll in Peace" (Kodak Black featuring XXXTentacion)	2017	31	16	14	Project Baby 2
"92 Explorer" (Post Malone)	2018	40	26	19	Beerbongs & Bentleys
"No Stylist" (French Montana featuring Drake)	2018	47	22	20	No Stylist - EP and Montana
"Swervin" (A Boogie Wit Da Hoodie featuring 6ix9ine)	2018	38			Hoodie SZN
"Die Young" (Roddy Ricch)	2018	99			Non-album single
"Wanna Be" (French Montana featuring PARTYNEXTDOOR & London On Da Track)	2018				Montana
"My Type" (Saweetie)	2019	21			Icy
"Throw Fits" (G-Eazy featuring City Girls & Juvenile)	2019				Non-album single
"Tap" (Nav featuring Meek Mill)	2019	87			Bad Habits
"fuckyounoah" (Noah Cyrus featuring London On Da Track)	2019				Non-album single
"Kills You Slowly" (The Chainsmokers)	2019				Non-album single
"Something Real" (Summer Walker featuring London On Da Track)	2019				Non-album single
"Over It" (Summer Walker)	2019	90	11		Over It
"Playing Games" (Summer Walker with Bryson Tiller)	2019	16	2		Over It
"Come Thru" (Summer Walker)	2019	42	5		Over It
"Numbers" (A Boogie Wit Da Hoodie featuring Roddy Ricch, Gunna, and London On Da Track)	2020	23			Artist 2.0
"Drop" (DaBaby featuring A Boogie wit da Hoodie and London on da Track)	2020	71	—	—	Blame It on Baby
"—" denotes a recording that did not chart or was not released in that territory.

== 2011 ==
=== Dem White Boyz – Why Not!? ===
- 06. "Shoestrings"

=== Maceo – Mexico City ===
- 09. "Mine" (feat. Tasha)

== 2012 ==
=== Rich Kidz – Everybody Eat Bread ===
- 04. "Never Did"
- 05. "We So Deep" (feat. Trouble)
- 09. "Sunrise Interlude"
- 13. "Koo Koo" (feat. Slim Dunkin)
- 17. "Easy Water"
- 18. "Live From The Booth (Freestyle)"
- 19. "Pimp Or Slum" (feat. Sammy Dammy & RK Sabo)

=== Slim Dunkin & D-Bo – Block Illegal II: My Brother's Keeper ===
- 04. "Double Up" (produced with TM88)
- 07. "Rockstar" (feat. Roscoe Dash) (produced with TM88)
- 08. "Freezer Tag"
- 09. "All We Got"
- 13. "Feelin Myself" (feat. Trae tha Truth)
- 15. "I Be Flexin"
- 17. "Celebration"
- 20. "Missin You"
- 21. "If I Make It" (feat. Tasha Catour)

=== Dirt Gang – Welcome To Jurassic Park ===
- 10. "Double Up" (produced with TM88)

=== Waka Flocka Flame – Salute Me or Shoot Me 4 (Banned from America) ===
- 08. "Randy Savage" (feat. B. Ceeze and Frenchie)

=== Rich Kidz – Straight Like That 3 ===
- 01. "You Won"
- 04. "Kool On The Low"
- 05. "Housewife"
- 06. "Fantasy"
- 12. "Most Tonight"
- 13. "In The Car"

== 2013 ==
=== Sy Ari Da Kid & Dae Dae – Civil War 2: 2 Sides Of A Story ===
- 08. "Movin Up" (feat. Frenchie)

=== Chaz Gotti – Voice of Dunk ===
- 01. "VOD Intro"
- 05. "The Man" (feat. Waka Flocka Flame)
- 10. "Bring It Back" (feat. K Camp)
- 12. "Butt Naked Truth"

=== Strap Da Fool – All In ===
- 07. Heinz 57 (feat. Gucci Mane)

=== J Mike – Keys 2 the City ===
- 02. "Keys 2 Da City"

=== Quez – Black Boe Knows ===
- 03. "Dirty Money" (feat. Chico Ali)
- 14. "Shawty What's Yo Name" (feat. Strap Da Fool)

=== Waka Flocka Flame – DuFlocka Rant Halftime Show ===
- 07. "Red Ferrari" (feat. Sosay & Chaz Gotti)

=== D Dash – Mill B4 Dinner Time ===
- 07. "Don't Play Wit Me" (Chaz Gotti & Que)

=== Chaz Gotti – 808 Gotti ===
- 05. "What I Wanna Do" (feat. D Dash) (produced with Southside)

=== K-So – Glasses ===
- 15. "Ain't Nothin Personal"

=== Gucci Mane – Diary Of A Trap God ===
- 18. "Virgin" (feat. Young Dolph & Young Thug)

=== Rich Kidz – A West Side Story ===
- 01. "Make It"
- 07. "Winner" (feat. K Camp)
- 08. "More" (Produced with DJ Plugg)
- 14. "Pop That"

=== Trae tha Truth – I Am King ===
- 06. "Shit Crazy" (feat. D Dash Bo)

=== Yung Booke – City on My Back ===
- 10. "Neva Left" (feat. Smashgang Freaky & Lake Savage)

=== Rich Homie Quan – I Promise I Will Never Stop Going In ===
- 01. "They Don't Know"

=== Travis Porter – Mr. Porter ===
- 04. "I'm a Dog"
- 06. "My Bitch Bad"

== 2014 ==
=== Strap Da Fool – All In 2 ===
- 23. "I'm Up"
- 27. "Out Da Profit"

=== D Dash & Frenchie – Underrated ===
- 06. "Money Talks"

=== 2 Chainz ===
- 00. "Dresser (Lil Boy)" (feat. Young Thug) (co-produced with FKi and JGRAMM)

=== Waka Flocka Flame – Re-Up ===
- 06. "How I'm Rockin"

=== Travis Porter – Music, Money, Magnums 2 ===
- 01. "Attached"
- 07. "Andalay"
- 10. "She Knows" (feat. Problem)
- 11. "Geekin'"

=== Gucci Mane – The Return Of Mr. Perfect ===
- 08. "Filthy Large" (feat. Strap Da Fool)
- 10. "Night Rider"

=== Chaz Gotti – Wait'n ===
- 02. "Million Dollars'"
- 03. "Babies Cryin'" (feat. Migos) (Produced with DJ Spinz)
- 08. "Bring It Back" (feat. K Camp & Stuey Rock)
- 09. "Days On The Southside"
- 10. "No Trust" (feat. K Camp)
- 11. "The Man" (feat. Waka Flocka Flame)

=== Rich Gang – Tha Tour Part 1 ===
- 06. "Flava" (Young Thug & Rich Homie Quan)
- 07. "730"
- 09. "Tell Em (Lies)" (Young Thug & Rich Homie Quan)
- 12. "Imma Ride" (Young Thug, Rich Homie Quan, & Birdman)
- 14. "Keep It Goin"

== 2015 ==
=== Lil Wayne – Sorry 4 the Wait 2 ===
- 15. "No Haters"
- 00. "Amazing Amy" (feat. Migos)

=== 2 Chainz - T.R.U. Jack City ===
- 16. “Can't Tell Me Shyt” (feat. Skooly & Cap 1)

=== The Real University – T.R.U. Jack City ===
- 13. "Can't Tell Me Shyt" (by Cap 1 and Skooly)

=== Soundz – Like Jordan ===
- 15. "Stephanie" (produced with Soundz)

=== Young Thug – Barter 6 ===
- 02. "With That" (feat. Duke)
- 04. "Check"
- 12. "Numbers"

=== Boosie Badazz – Touchdown 2 Cause Hell ===
- 06. "Retaliation"

=== Lil Durk – Remember My Name ===
- 10. "Why Me"

=== Lil Wayne – Free Weezy Album ===
- 05. "London Roads"

=== Young Jeezy – Gangsta Party ===
- 01. "I Might" (feat. Rich Homie Quan)

=== T.I. – Da' Nic ===
- 04. "Peanut Butter Jelly" (feat. Young Dro & Young Thug)

=== Ty Dolla Sign - Free TC ===
- 15. "Actress" (feat. R. Kelly) (prod. with D'Mile)

=== Young Thug – Slime Season ===
- 01 "Take Kare (feat. Lil Wayne)"
- 06 "Power"
- 08 "No Way"
- 13 "Again (feat. Gucci Mane)"
- 16 "Draw Down"
- 18 "Wanna Be Me"

=== Young Thug – Slime Season 2 ===
- 03 "Don't Know (feat. Shad da God)"
- 04 "Hey, I"
- 14 "Bout (Damn) Time"
- 18 "Never Made Love (feat. Rich Homie Quan)"
- 20 "No No No (feat. Birdman)"
- 22 "Love Me Forever (Chopped & Screwed)"

=== 50 Cent – The Kanan Tape ===
- 02. "Too Rich For The Bitch"

=== Yung Ralph - I Am Juugman ===
- 17. "Imma Ride (feat. Young Thug & Birdman)"

=== Figg Panamera - God's Plan ===
- 02. "Carlito"
- 03. "Celebration"
- 06. "Let Her Breath"
- 09. "What's up"
- 10. "Trapflix"
- 20. "I Told Her Once"

=== Lil Reese - Supa Savage 2 ===
- 07. "Baby" (Featuring Young Thug)

=== Young Jeezy - Church In These Streets ===
- 04. "Gold Bottles"
- 05. "Hell You Talkin' Bout"

=== Keyshia Cole ===
- "Don't Waste My Time" (feat. Young Thug)

=== Jeremih - Late Nights ===
- 03. "Impatient" (feat. Ty Dolla Sign)

== 2016 ==
=== YG – Off My Bullshit ===
- "I Wanna Benz" (feat. 50 Cent & Nipsey Hussle)

=== 2 Chainz & Lil Wayne - ColleGrove ===
- "Section"

=== French Montana - Wave Gods ===
- 08. "Groupie Love" (feat. Quavo)

=== Young Thug - Slime Season 3 ===
- "Memo"
- "Digits"
- "Worth It"
- "Tattoos"
- "Problem"

=== Bankroll Mafia - Bankroll Mafia ===
- 11. "Screwed It Up" (feat. London Jae, Shad da God and T.I.)

=== Lil Duke - Uber ===
- "Paid And Full"

=== Young Buck - 10 Bodies ===
- "No Worries"

=== Tory Lanez - Fargo Fridays ===
- 09. "Unforgetful"

=== Travis Porter - 285 ===
- 04. "Trap"
- 09. "Lame"

=== Ace Hood - Starvation 5 ===
- 02. "Message to the label"

=== Ralo - Diary of the Streets 2 ===
- 19. "Pull Up" (featuring Birdman & Jacquees)

=== Young Thug & T.I. - Margiela Music 3 ===
- 02. "Bobby Womack"

=== Soulja Boy - Real Soulja 4 Life ===
- 04. "Rockstar"

=== Blac Youngsta - Fuck Everybody ===
- 03. "Tissue"

=== Yung Booke - 6 The Giant ===
- 02. "Ain't Nothing Changed"

=== Gucci Mane - Woptober ===
- 01. "Intro: Fuck 12"
- 06. "Wop"

=== Dae Dae - The Defanition ===
- 01. "Black Lives Matter"
- 02. "Bullshit" (feat. 21 Savage)
- 03. "Dead Ass Wrong"
- 04. "Don't You Change"
- 05. "Hit The Block"
- 06. "How You Feel"
- 07. "Kodak"
- 08. "Love Life Pages
- 09. "Ride" (feat TK Kravitz)
- 10. "Street Shit"
- 11. "Woke Up"

=== Gucci Mane & Future - Free Bricks 2K16 (Zone 6 Edition) ===
- 02. "Selling Heroin" (co-produced with Southside)

=== Drake - More Life ===
- "Sneakin'" (feat. 21 Savage)

=== Lil Durk - They Forgot ===
- 07. "Young Niggas" (feat. Meek Mill)

=== Kayla Brianna - Girl Talk ===
- "Work For It" (feat. YFN Lucci)

== 2017 ==
=== Trapaholics - Real Trap Shit & Real Niggas Losing Edition ===
- 03. "Grave Yard Shift

=== Bloody Jay - Real Niggas Losing ===
- 04. "No Mask"

=== Money Man - Black Circle 2 ===
- 15. "Out The Mud" (Featuring Young Thug)

=== Philthy Rich - Seminary ===
- 12. "Street Life" (Featuring Neno Calvin & Derez De'Shon)

=== Yung Ralph - I Am Juugman 2 ===
- 02. "I Know You Know"

=== Gucci Mane - DropTopWop ===
- 08 "Both Eyes Closed" (feat. 2 Chainz & Young Dolph) (Produced with Metro Boomin)

=== Young Thug - Beautiful Thugger Girls ===
- 04. "Daddy's Birthday (co produced w/ Scott Storch)
- 05. "Do U Love Me"

=== French Montana - Jungle Rules ===
- 09. "Migo Montana" (feat. Quavo)

=== Sy Ari Da Kid - 2 Weeks No Diss ===
- 04. "Traded" (feat. K Camp)

=== Kodak Black - Project Baby 2 ===
- 03. "Roll In Peace" (Feat. XXXTentacion) (Produced with Cubeatz)
- 04. "6th Sense"
- 05. "Don't Wanna Breath" (Produced with Rex Kudo)
- 11. "You Do That Shit" (Produced with Cassius Jay)

=== Derez De'Shon - Pain ===
- 01. "Ambition"

Young Penny Hardaway

- 04. "Hardaway" (with DJ Envy)
- 07. "Fed Up"
- 16. "She Wanna Be Down"
- 00. "Hardaway (Remix) (with DJ Envy, featuring Yo Gotti and 2 Chainz) (leftover track)

=== Future & Young Thug - Super Slimey ===
- 11. “Killed Before”

=== Yo Gotti - I Still Am ===
- 01. “Betrayal” (Co. prod with Southside)

=== PnB Rock - Catch These Vibes ===
- 02. “London”

=== Derez De’Shon - Thank Da Streets ===
- 03. “ Dope Hole” (feat. O.T. Genasis & Uncle Murda)
- 07. “Don't Push Me”
- 09. “Just Tryna Live”

== 2018 ==
=== Gunna - Drip Season 3 ===
- 11. “My Soul” (Co. Prod with Metro Boomin)

=== Various Artists - The Uncle Drew Motion Picture Soundtrack ===
- 01. “Cocky” (feat. A$AP Rocky, 21 Savage, & Gucci Mane)

=== Bo Deal - Good Side Bad Side 2 ===
- 02. “Ain’t Real” (feat. Derez Deshon & Lil Bibby)

=== Cash Money Records - Before Anything Motion Picture Soundtrack ===
- 07. “You” (feat. Jacquees)
- 13. “Like U Kno” (feat. Derez Deshon & Jacquees)

=== Post Malone - Beerbongs & Bentleys ===
- 16. “92 Explorer” (Co. Prod w/ Roark Bentley & Aubrey Robinson)

=== Tee Grizzley - Activated ===
- 02. “2 Vaults” (feat. Lil Yachty)
- 05. “Connect”

=== Lil Baby - Harder than Ever ===
- 12. “Right Now” (feat. Young Thug)

=== Uncle Drew Motion picture Soundtrack ===
- 04. “Cocky” (Co. Prod with Hector Delgado) (feat. A$AP Rocky, Gucci Mane & 21 Savage)

=== Young Thug - On the Rvn ===
- 01. “On The Run” (Co. Prod with Cubeatz)
- 03. “Climax” (feat. 6lack)
- 04. “Sin” (feat. Jaden Smith)

=== T.I. - Dime Trap ===
- 07. "At Least I Know" (feat. Anderson Paak)

=== French Montana - No Stylist EP ===
- 01. "No Stylist" (feat. Drake)

=== Roddy Ricch - Feed The Streets 2 ===
- 04. “Die Young” (Co. Prod w/ Rex Kudo)

=== Kodak Black - Dying to Live ===
- 02. “This Forever“ (Co Prod with Rex Kudo)

=== A Boogie wit da Hoodie - Hoodie SZN ===
- 04. “Swervin” (feat. 6ix9ine)

=== Derez De’Shon - Pain 2 ===
- 05. “Need some Mo” (feat. Lil Baby) (produced with Stoopid Beats)
- 06. “Fallin” (feat. Russ)
- 08. “Whaddup Doe” (feat. Mozzy)
- 17. “Lately”

== 2019 ==
=== Dreezy - Big Dreez ===
- 09. “No Love” (feat. Derez De’Shon)
- 10. “Where Them $ @“

=== DaBaby - KIRK ===
- 12. “THERE HE GO”

=== Summer Walker - Over It ===
- 1. “Over It” (Prod with Aubrey Robinson & Roark Bailey)
- 2. “Body” (Prod with Aubrey Robinson & Roark Bailey)
- 3. “Playing Games” (with Bryson Tiller) (Extended Version)
- 4. “Drunk Dialing...LODT” (Prod with Kevin Richardson, Roark Bailey, Cameron Griffin & Aubrey Robinson)
- 5. “Come Thru” (with Usher) (Prod with Aubrey Robinson & Roark Bailey)
- 6. “Potential” (Prod with Aubrey Robinson & Roark Bailey)
- 8. “Tonight” (Prod with F a l l e n, Aubrey Robinson & Roark Bailey)
- 10. “Like It” (with 6LACK) (Prod with F a l l e n, Aubrey Robinson & Roark Bailey)
- 12. “Stretch You Out” (feat. A Boogie Wit Da Hoodie)
- 14. “Anna Mae” (Prod with Roark Bailey & Scott Storch)
- 15. “I'll Kill You” (feat. Jhené Aiko) (Prod with Roark Bailey, Aubrey Robinson & Scott Storch)
- 16. “Nobody Else” (Prod with Roark Bailey, Aubrey Robinson & Stevie J)
- 17. “Playing Games”

=== YK Osiris - The Golden Child ===
- 12. “Ballin”

=== Davido - A Good Time ===
- 6. “D&G” (feat. Summer Walker)

=== Blac Youngsta - Church on Sunday ===
- 7. "All I Want" (featuring Jacquees)

=== French Montana - Montana ===
- 12. "Wanna Be" (featuring PartyNextDoor)
- 15. "No Stylist" (featuring Drake)

=== Fetty Wap - Fresh N Clean ===
- "Fresh N Clean"

== 2020 ==
=== Lil Gotit - Superstar Creature ===
- Executive Producer

=== A Boogie wit da Hoodie - Artist 2.0 ===
- 1. "Thug Love"
- 5. "Numbers" (featuring Roddy Ricch, Gunna and London on da Track)
- 9. "Calm Down (Bittersweet)" (featuring Summer Walker)

=== Rich the Kid - Boss Man ===
- 11. "Ain't No Doubts"
- 16. "I Want Mo"

=== DaBaby - Blame It on Baby ===
- 10. "Drop" (featuring A Boogie wit da Hoodie and London on da Track)
- 12. "Nasty" (featuring Ashanti and Megan Thee Stallion)

=== Ariana Grande - Positions ===
- 12. "Positions"

== 2021 ==
=== Lil Baby and Lil Durk - The Voice of the Heroes ===
- 5. "Still Hood"
- 8. "Medical"

=== Summer Walker - Still Over It ===
- 1. "Bitter (Narration By Cardi B)" (with Cardi B)
- 2. "Ex for a Reason" (with JT and City Girls)
- 4. "Throw It Away"
- 5. "Reciprocate"
- 7. "Circus"
- 8. "Insane"
- 9. "Constant Bullshit"
- 11. "Unloyal" (with Ari Lennox)
- 12. "Closure"
- 15. "Screwin" (with Omarion)

== 2022 ==
=== YoungBoy Never Broke Again - Realer 2 ===
- 14. "You Knew"

== 2023 ==
=== Young Thug - Business Is Business ===
- 7. "Abracadabra" (featuring Travis Scott)

=== Coi Leray - Coi ===
- 12. "No Angels" (featuring Lola Brooke)

=== A Boogie wit da Hoodie - B4 BOA ===
- 1. "Her Birthday"
- 2. "Booby Trap"

=== Diddy - The Love Album: Off the Grid ===
- 8. "Stay Long" (featuring Summer Walker)
- 9. "It Belongs To You" (with Jozzy)

=== Kaliii - FCK GIRL SZN ===
- 1. "Say Too Much" (featuring Young Nudy)

=== PinkPantheress - Heaven Knows ===
- 7. "Internet baby (interlude)"

== 2024 ==
=== 21 Savage - American Dream ===
- 3. "Redrum"

=== ¥$ (Kanye West and Ty Dolla Sign) - Vultures 1 ===
- 13. "Beg Forgiveness" (Produced with Ye, Ty Dolla Sign, Anthony Kilhoffer, JPEGMafia and Vitals)

=== A Boogie wit da Hoodie - Better Off Alone ===
- 6. "Steppas" (Produced with CashMoneyAP, Daniel Moras, Dez Wright and Tone Deaf)
- 8. "Spotlight" (Produced with Dinero)
- 10. "One Shot" (Produced with AyoPeeb, Vitals, Phil and Nuki Beats)
- 13. "P&E" (Produced with FnZ, Scott Storch, Vitals and Phil)
- 19. "Her Birthday" (Produced with Sean Momberger, Philip Cornish and Tone Deaf)
- 20. "Booby Trap" (Produced with Zaytoven, Deezy Beats and Tone Deaf)
