= 2020 Soul Train Music Awards =

US music awards ceremony

Soul Train Music Awards
- Date: November 29, 2020
- Country: United States
- Hosted by: Tisha Campbell & Tichina Arnold
- Most awards: Chris Brown (4)
- Most nominations: H.E.R. (8)
- Website: www.bet.com/shows/soul-train-awards/

Television/radio coverage
- Network: BET, BET Her, VH1, MTV2
- Produced by: BET, Jesse Collins Entertainment

The 2020 Soul Train Music Awards took place on November 29, 2020, to recognize the best in soul, R&B and Hip-Hop music. The ceremony aired on BET, BET Her, VH1 and MTV2, with actors Tisha Campbell & Tichina Arnold hosting the ceremony for the third time.

The nominations were announced on November 11, 2020, with H.E.R. leading with eight nominations, followed by Chris Brown with seven. American singer and songwriter Monica was honored with the Lady of Soul Award for her contributions to the music industry.

== Special awards ==
Honorees are as listed below:

=== Lady Of Soul Award ===
Monica

== Winners and nominees ==
Nominees are as listed below. The winners by each categories are in bold characters.

=== Best New Artist ===
- **Snoh Aalegra**
  - Giveon
  - Layton Greene
  - Lonr.
  - SAINt JHN
  - Victoria Monét

=== Soul Train Certified Award ===
- **Brandy**
  - Fantasia
  - Kelly Rowland
  - Ledisi
  - Monica
  - PJ Morton

=== Best R&B/Soul Female Artist ===
- **H.E.R.**
  - Beyoncé
  - Alicia Keys
  - Jhené Aiko
  - Brandy
  - Summer Walker

=== Best R&B/Soul Male Artist ===
- **Chris Brown**
  - Anderson .Paak
  - Charlie Wilson
  - PJ Morton
  - The Weeknd
  - Usher

=== Best Gospel/Inspirational Award ===
- **Kirk Franklin**
  - Bebe Winans
  - Koryn Hawthorne
  - Marvin Sapp
  - PJ Morton
  - The Clark Sisters

=== Rhythm & Bars Award (Best Hip-Hop Song Of The Year) ===
- **Megan Thee Stallion – "Savage"**
  - Cardi B – "WAP" (featuring Megan Thee Stallion)
  - DaBaby – "Rockstar" (featuring Roddy Ricch)
  - DJ Khaled – "Popstar" (featuring Drake)
  - Drake – "Laugh Now Cry Later" (featuring Lil Durk)
  - Roddy Ricch – "The Box"

=== Song Of The Year ===
- **Chris Brown and Young Thug – "Go Crazy"**
  - Beyoncé – "BLACK PARADE"
  - Chloe x Halle – "Do It"
  - H.E.R. (featuring YG) – "Slide"
  - Summer Walker & Usher – "Come Thru"
  - Usher (featuring Ella Mai) – "Don't Waste My Time"

=== Album Of The Year ===
- **Summer Walker – Over It**
  - Chloe x Halle – Ungodly Hour
  - Brandy – B7
  - Chris Brown & Young Thug – Slime & B
  - Jhené Aiko – Chilombo
  - The Weeknd – After Hours

=== The Ashford And Simpson Songwriter's Award ===
- **H.E.R – "I Can't Breathe"**
  - **Written by H.E.R.**
- Beyoncé – "BLACK PARADE"
  - Written by Akil King, Beyoncé Knowles Carter, Brittany Coney, Denisia Andrews, Derek James Dixie, Kim "Kaydence" Krysiuk, Rickie "Caso" Tice, Shawn Carter, Stephen Bray
- Chloe x Halle – "Do It"
  - Written by Chloe Bailey, Halle Bailey, Scott Storch, Victoria Monét, Vincent van den Ende, Anton Kuhl
- Chris Brown and Young Thug – "Go Crazy"
  - Written by Cameron Devaun Murphy, Christopher Brown, Dounia Aznou, Jeffrey Lamar Williams, Johnny Kelvin, Kaniel Castaneda, Omari Akinlolu, OrvilleHall, Patrizio Pigliapoco, Phillip Price, Said Aznou, Soraya Benjelloun, Tre Samuels, Turell Sims, Wayne Samuels, Zakaria Kharbouch
- Summer Walker (featuring Bryson Tiller) – "Playing Games"
  - Written by Summer Walker, Bryson Tiller, London Holmes, Kendall Roark Bailey, Cameron Griffin, Aubrey Robinson, Beyoncé Knowles, Kelendria Rowland, LeToya Luckett, LaTavia Roberson, LaShawn Daniels, Fred Jerkins III, Rodney Jerkins
- H.E.R. (featuring YG) – "Slide"
  - Written by Charles Carter, Elijah Dias, H.E.R., Jermaine Dupri, Keenon Daequan Ray Jackson, Roger Parker, Ron Latour, Shawn Carter, Steven Arrington, Tiara Thomas, Wuang

=== Best Dance Performance ===
- **Chris Brown – "Go Crazy" (with Young Thug)**
  - Beyoncé – "Already" (with Shatta Wale and Major Lazer)
  - Chloe x Halle – "Do It"
  - DaniLeigh – "Levi High" (featuring DaBaby)
  - Missy Elliott – "Why I Still Love You"
  - Teyana Taylor – "Bare wit Me"

=== Best Collaboration Performance ===
- **Chris Brown – "Go Crazy" (with Young Thug)**
  - H.E.R. – "Slide" (featuring YG)
  - Ne-Yo – "U 2 Luv" (featuring Jeremih)
  - Skip Marley – "Slow Down" (with H.E.R.)
  - Summer Walker & Usher – "Come Thru"
  - Usher (featuring Ella Mai) – "Don't Waste My Time"

=== Video Of The Year ===
- **Beyoncé – "Brown Skin Girl" (with SAINt JHN, Wizkid and Blue Ivy)**
  - Chris Brown – "Go Crazy" (with Young Thug)
  - Chloe x Halle – "Do It"
  - Skip Marley – "Slow Down" (with H.E.R.)
  - H.E.R. – "Slide" (featuring YG)
  - Lizzo – "Good as Hell"
