= Stretch You Out =

2019 single by Summer Walker featuring A Boogie wit da Hoodie

Single by Summer Walker featuring A Boogie wit da Hoodie

from the album Over It
- Released: September 24, 2019
- Length: 2:23
- Label: LVRN; Interscope
- Songwriters: Summer Walker; Artist Dubose; London Holmes; Vojtěch Daníček; Kendall Bailey; Aubrey Robinson
- Producers: London on da Track; Robinson; Bailey; Zane98

Summer Walker singles chronology
"Playing Games" (2019)	"Stretch You Out" (2019)	"Triggered (Remix)" (2019)

A Boogie wit da Hoodie singles chronology
"Stack It Up" (2019)	"Stretch You Out" (2019)	"Party" (2019)

Music video
- "Stretch You Out" on YouTube

"Stretch You Out" is a song by American singer Summer Walker, released on September 24, 2019 as the second single from her debut studio album Over It (2019). It features American rapper A Boogie wit da Hoodie and was produced by London on da Track, Aubrey Robinson, Roark Bailey and Zane98.

== Content ==
The song revolves around a toxic relationship in the past, as Summer Walker criticizes an ex-boyfriend who demanded so much from her but refused to return the favor and compared her to one of his other sexual partners. A Boogie wit da Hoodie describes what he prefers in a relationship with a girl.

== Music video ==
The music video was released alongside the single. A neon-lit visual, it depicts Summer Walker as an erotic dancer on a stripper pole, at a club that appears to be empty. She entertains London on da Track with a private dance and makes a lot of money from him.

== Charts ==
Chart (2019)	Peak position
UK Singles (Official Charts)	70
US Billboard Hot 100	68
US Hot R&B/Hip-Hop Songs (Billboard)	33

== Certifications ==
Region	Certification	Certified units/sales
Canada (Music Canada)	Gold	40,000^{‡}
United States (RIAA)	Platinum	1,000,000^{‡}
^{‡} Sales+streaming figures based on certification alone.
