= King of My City =

2020 song by A Boogie wit da Hoodie

Single by A Boogie wit da Hoodie

from the album Artist 2.0
- Released: January 31, 2020
- Length: 2:28
- Label: Highbridge; Atlantic
- Songwriters: Artist Dubose; Damil Coste; Joseph Zoumboulias; Matthew Samuels; Shaun Thomas
- Producers: Boi-1da; S. Dot; JoeFromYO; DLo Beatz

A Boogie wit da Hoodie singles chronology
"Slide (Remix)" (2020)	"King of My City" (2020)	"Numbers" (2020)

Music video
- "King of My City" on YouTube

"King of My City" is a song by American rapper A Boogie wit da Hoodie. It was released on January 31, 2020 as the third single from his third studio album Artist 2.0 (2020), with an accompanying music video. The song was produced by Boi-1da, S. Dot, JoeFromYO and DLo Beatz.

== Background ==
On January 29, 2020, A Boogie wit da Hoodie teased the song on Instagram and released it two days later. Rapper Lil Uzi Vert was originally featured on the song.

== Composition ==
On the track A Boogie sings about his neighborhood, Highbridge, Bronx, and his crew, and how they are not to be messed with.

== Music video ==
The music video was released on January 31, 2020, and sets the scene for Highbridge. A Boogie is on the streets among a group of "Joker lookalikes", and vandalizes cars, dines luxuriously and pops champagne bottles.

== Charts ==
Chart (2020)	Peak position
Canada Hot 100 (Billboard)	71
New Zealand Hot Singles (RMNZ)	24
US Billboard Hot 100	69
US Hot R&B/Hip-Hop Songs (Billboard)	32

== Certifications ==
Region	Certification	Certified units/sales
Canada (Music Canada)	Gold	40,000^{‡}
United States (RIAA)	Gold	500,000^{‡}
^{‡} Sales+streaming figures based on certification alone.
