= Something Real =

Something Real may refer to:

== Music ==
=== Albums ===
- Something Real (Meg & Dia album)
- Something Real (Phoebe Snow album)
- Something Real (Stephanie Mills album)
- Something Real, a 2016 album by Fedde Le Grand

=== Songs ===
- "Something Real" (Summer Walker song)
- "Something Real (Inside Me/Inside You)", by Mr. Mister, 1987
- "Something Real", by Armin van Buuren from Balance
- "Something Real", by China Anne McClain and Kelli Berglund from How to Build a Better Boy
- "Something Real", by Dierks Bentley from Gravel & Gold
- "Something Real", by Post Malone from Austin
- "Something Real", by Shana

== Other uses ==
- "Something Real", a short story by Rick Wilber
