= Me and My Guitar =

Me and My Guitar may refer to:

- Me and My Guitar (Chet Atkins album), 1977
- Me & My Guitar (Tony Rice album), 1986
- "Me and My Guitar" (Tom Dice song), 2010
- "Me and My Guitar" (A Boogie wit da Hoodie song), 2020
- "Me and My Guitar", a song by James Taylor from Walking Man, covered by Chet Atkins and Tony Rice
