= Bleed (A Boogie wit da Hoodie song) =

Single by A Boogie wit da Hoodie

from the album Artist 2.0
- Released: June 16, 2020
- Length: 2:57
- Label: Highbridge; Atlantic
- Songwriters: Artist Dubose; Shaun Thomas; Joseph Zoumboulias
- Producers: S.Dot; JoeFromYO

A Boogie wit da Hoodie singles chronology
"Numbers" (2019)	"Bleed" (2020)	"Flood My Wrist" (2020)

Music video
- "Bleed" on YouTube

"Bleed" is a song by American rapper A Boogie wit da Hoodie, and the fifth single from his third studio album, Artist 2.0 (2020). It was released on June 16, 2020, and appears on the deluxe edition of the album. The song was produced by S.Dot and JoeFromYO.

== Background ==
According to A Boogie wit da Hoodie, the song was originally intended to be a collaboration with the rapper Pop Smoke, who died before A Boogie could present it to him.

== Composition ==
Aaron Williams of Uproxx described the song as "ominous" and more "aggressive". "Bleed" finds A Boogie wit da Hoodie melodically rapping about valuing wealth and materialistic possessions over love, over a "sinister" drill instrumental produced by S.Dot and JoeFromYO, consisting of "haunting keys and sliding 808s".

== Charts ==
Chart (2020)	Peak position
Canada Hot 100 (Billboard)	55
New Zealand Hot Singles (RMNZ)	22
UK Singles (OCC)	82
US Billboard Hot 100	57
US Hot R&B/Hip-Hop Songs (Billboard)	25
US Hot Rap Songs (Billboard)	20

== Certifications ==
Region	Certification	Certified units/sales
Canada (Music Canada)	Gold	40,000^{‡}
United States (RIAA)	Gold	500,000^{‡}
^{‡} Sales+streaming figures based on certification alone.
