= Pull up (disambiguation) =

Pull-up is an upper body exercise.

Pull up may also refer to:

- Training pants, a form of diaper that is in one solid piece, in the same form as underwear, lacking taped sides

- Huggies Pull-Ups, a brand of training pants

- Pull up, a code refactoring technique used in object-oriented programming
- Pull up, the process of changing a film from one frame rate to another - see telecine
- Pull-up jumper, a basketball move in which a player dribble drives, stops and shoots a jump shot
- Pull up, to stop or slow a racehorse during or after a race or workout
- "PULL UP", an audible warning given by the ground proximity warning systems of many fixed-wing aircraft

== Music ==
- Pull Up (album), by Johan, 2018
- "Pull Up" (KSI song), 2019
- "Pull Up" (Lil Mosey song), 2017
- "Pull Up" (Wiz Khalifa song), 2016
- "Pull Up", a song by Chris Brown from Heartbreak on a Full Moon, 2017
- "Pull Up", a song by Koffee from Gifted, 2022
- "Pull Up", a song by Lil Wayne from Free Weezy Album, 2015
- "Pull Up", a song by Martin Jensen, 2018
- "Pull Up", a song by Mr. Vegas, 2004
- "Pull Up", a song by Rich Gang featuring Ralo Stylz, Jacquees and Birdman from Diary of the Streets 2, 2016
- "Pull Up", a song by Toosii from Naujour, 2023
- "Pull Up", a song by Viviz from Various, 2023
- "Pull Up (WYA)", a song by DreamDoll, 2018

== See also ==
- Pull-up resistor, a component of a digital electronics circuit
- Pulldown (disambiguation)
