= 2K16 =

2K16 may refer to:

- the year 2016
- NBA 2K16, 2015 video game
- WWE 2K16, 2015 video game
- Free Bricks 2K16 (Zone 6 Edition), 2016 EP by rappers Gucci Mane and Future
