= Me and My Guitar (A Boogie wit da Hoodie song) =

2020 song by A Boogie wit da Hoodie

Song by A Boogie wit da Hoodie

from the album Artist 2.0
- Released: 2020
- Genre: Emo rap
- Length: 2:41
- Label: Highbridge; Atlantic
- Songwriters: Artist Dubose; Louis Bell; Andrew Wotman
- Producers: Louis Bell; Andrew Watt

"Me and My Guitar" is a song by American rapper A Boogie wit da Hoodie from his third studio album Artist 2.0 (2020). It was written alongside producers Louis Bell and Andrew Watt.

== Background ==
A Boogie wit da Hoodie originally planned the song to be a collaboration with fellow rapper and singer Juice Wrld, who died in December 2019 before it could be fulfilled.

== Composition ==
"Me and My Guitar" is an emo rap song containing guitar and "creaking" vocals, as well as lyrics about "snitching" and loyalty.

== Live performances ==
On February 28, 2020, A Boogie wit da Hoodie performed the song on The Tonight Show Starring Jimmy Fallon along with American singer H.E.R., who played an additional guitar solo in the performance.

== Charts ==
Chart performance for "Me and My Guitar"
Chart (2020)	Peak position
New Zealand Hot Singles (RMNZ)	36
UK Singles (Official Charts)	99
US Billboard Hot 100	58
US Hot R&B/Hip-Hop Songs (Billboard)	28

== Certifications ==
Certifications for "Me and My Guitar"
Region	Certification	Certified units/sales
Canada (Music Canada)	2× Platinum	160,000^{‡}
New Zealand (RMNZ)	Gold	15,000^{‡}
United Kingdom (BPI)	Silver	200,000^{‡}
United States (RIAA)	Platinum	1,000,000^{‡}
^{‡} Sales+streaming figures based on certification alone.
