= Reply (song) =

2019 single by A Boogie wit da Hoodie featuring Lil Uzi Vert

Single by A Boogie wit da Hoodie featuring Lil Uzi Vert

from the album Artist 2.0
- Released: November 15, 2019
- Length: 3:03
- Label: Highbridge; Atlantic
- Songwriter(s): Artist Dubose; Symere Woods; Joseph Zoumboulias; Kevin Andre Price
- Producer(s): Go Grizzly; JoeFromYO

A Boogie wit da Hoodie singles chronology
"Somebody" (2019)	"Reply" (2019)	"Tip Toe" (2019)

Lil Uzi Vert singles chronology
"Pose" (2019)	"Reply" (2019)	"Futsal Shuffle 2020" (2019)

Music video
- "Reply" on YouTube

"Reply" is a song by American rapper A Boogie wit da Hoodie featuring fellow American rapper Lil Uzi Vert. It was released on November 15, 2019, by Highbridge and Atlantic Records as the second single from the former's third studio album Artist 2.0 (2020). Written alongside producers Go Grizzly and JoeFromYO, the music video for the song was released on June 18, 2020.

== Composition and critical reception ==
In the song, A Boogie and Lil Uzi ask women if they would reply to them on their phones when they write to them. Reflecting on their relationships with women, they bemoan over their love interests not returning their affection. Trey Alston of MTV called the song "beautiful with a chill melody and a relaxing groove."

== Charts ==
Chart (2019)	Peak position
Canada (Canadian Hot 100)	54
New Zealand Hot Singles (RMNZ)	16
US Billboard Hot 100	49
US Hot R&B/Hip-Hop Songs (Billboard)	22

== Certifications ==
Region	Certification	Certified units/sales
Canada (Music Canada)	Gold	40,000^{‡}
United States (RIAA)	Platinum	1,000,000^{‡}
^{‡} Sales+streaming figures based on certification alone.
