= Something Real (Summer Walker song) =

Single by Summer Walker, Chris Brown and London on da Track
- Released: November 22, 2019
- Recorded: 2019
- Genre: R&B
- Length: 3:34
- Label: LoveRenaissance; Interscope
- Songwriters: Summer Marjani Walker; Christopher Brown; Nija Charles; Alyssa Lourdiz Cantu
- Producer: London on da Track

Summer Walker singles chronology
"Triggered (Remix)" (2019)	"Something Real" (2019)	"Come Thru" (2020)

Chris Brown singles chronology
"Did You?" (2019)	"Something Real" (2019)	"Out of Your Mind" (2020)

London on da Track singles chronology
"Throw Fits" (2019)	"Something Real" (2019)	"Numbers" (2020)

"Something Real" is a song written and performed by American singers Summer Walker and Chris Brown and American record producer London on da Track. It was written by the performers alongside Nija Charles and Alyssa Lourdiz Cantu with sole production from London on da Track.

== Composition ==
"Something Real" is an R&B song where Walker expresses her desire to find the right man for her, explaining her needs to the person concerned and how her previous boyfriend did not please her, and Brown plays the part of the person concerned, explaining that he knows what she is about.

== Track listing ==
- Digital download and stream
1. "Something Real" – 3:34

== Charts ==
Chart performance for "Something Real"
Chart (2019)	Peak position
New Zealand Hot Singles (RMNZ)	17
UK Singles (Official Charts)	99
US Bubbling Under Hot 100 Singles (Billboard)	20
US Bubbling Under R&B/Hip-Hop Singles (Billboard)	2
US Hot R&B Songs (Billboard)	19

== Certifications ==
Certifications for "Something Real"
Region	Certification	Certified units/sales
New Zealand (RMNZ)	Gold	15,000^{‡}
United States (RIAA)	Gold	500,000^{‡}
^{‡} Sales+streaming figures based on certification alone.
