= Mood Swings (A Boogie wit da Hoodie song) =

2019 song by A Boogie wit da Hoodie

Single by A Boogie wit da Hoodie

from the album Artist 2.0
- Released: September 13, 2019
- Length: 2:37
- Label: Highbridge; Atlantic
- Songwriters: Artist Dubose; Wesley Glass
- Producer: Wheezy

A Boogie wit da Hoodie singles chronology
| "Ooh Girl" (2019) | "Mood Swings" (2019) | "Stack It Up" (2019) |

Music video
- "Mood Swings" on YouTube

"Mood Swings" is a song by American rapper A Boogie wit da Hoodie, released on September 13, 2019 by Highbridge and Atlantic Records. It is the lead single from his third studio album Artist 2.0 (2020), and was produced by Wheezy.

== Composition ==
The song focuses on A Boogie's "journey as an artist and the rollercoaster of emotions that comes with fame." Boogie sings and raps about his mood swings while dealing with fame and his sexual conquest. The chorus is built around him not using the last syllable of a word, replaced with a humming sound instead. The instrumental was produced by Wheezy, and features an "over-the-top base-filled trap beat with smooth guitar play".

== Music video ==
The music video was released on September 17, 2019, and was directed by A Boogie wit da Hoodie and Elf Rivera. It begins with A Boogie relaxing and walking through a thunderstorm in the night. He shows his eyes under his hooded raincoat to be lit neon blue. Boogie enters a place where he is joined by several people wearing hoodies obscuring their faces. He then recreates the cover of his mixtape Artist, where he is playing piano with a woman controlling his movements using strings, which are then cut by his camouflage-dressed alter ego. He later deals with paparazzi and goes to a strip club, before the video ends with him rapping and dancing while surrounded by female friends on quads.

== Charts ==
| Chart (2019) | Peak position |
|---|---|
| Canada Hot 100 (Billboard) | 61 |
| New Zealand Hot Singles (RMNZ) | 30 |
| US Billboard Hot 100 | 76 |
| US Hot R&B/Hip-Hop Songs (Billboard) | 32 |
| US Rhythmic Airplay (Billboard) | 36 |

== Certifications ==
| Region | Certification | Certified units/sales |
|---|---|---|
| Canada (Music Canada) | Platinum | 80,000^{‡} |
| United States (RIAA) | Platinum | 1,000,000^{‡} |
^{‡} Sales+streaming figures based on certification alone.
