= Over It (album) =

Studio album by Summer Walker
- Released: October 4, 2019
- Recorded: 2018–2019
- Genre: R&B
- Length: 48:54
- Labels: LVRN; Interscope
- Producers: London on da Track; Arsenio Archer; Aubrey Robinson; Kendell Bailey; OG Parker; Scott Storch; Stevie J; Summer Walker

Summer Walker chronology
Last Day of Summer (2018)	Over It (2019)	Still Over It (2021)

Singles from Over It
- 1. "Playing Games" Released: August 23, 2019; 2. "Stretch You Out" Released: September 24, 2019; 3. "Come Thru" Released: January 14, 2020

Over It is the debut studio album by American singer-songwriter Summer Walker. It was released on October 4, 2019, by LVRN and Interscope. It spawned the singles "Playing Games", "Stretch You Out", and "Come Thru". It also features the remix of Walker's "Girls Need Love" featuring Drake, and collaborations with Bryson Tiller, Usher, 6lack, PartyNextDoor, A Boogie wit da Hoodie and Jhené Aiko. Most of the album was produced by Walker's then-boyfriend, London on da Track. Walker's First and Last Tour supported the album, starting late October 2019.

== Promotion ==
An "old school" commercial was released via Walker's YouTube channel on September 30 to promote the album, which was compared to infomercials for R&B albums from the 1990s. Few days before the actual album release, Walker promoted the album by putting various payphone in various cities painted in the theme of the album. A phone number was to be dialed to listen to the album a few days before release. After the album's release, Walker premiered a special on Beats 1 guest starring Ari Lennox, as part of their R&B Now series.

== Critical reception ==
Professional ratings
Aggregate scores
Source	Rating
Metacritic	86/100
Review scores
Source	Rating
AllMusic	4/5 stars
Clash	8/10
Exclaim!	7/10
HipHopDX	4.5/5 stars
Pitchfork	7.2/10

Over It was met with critical acclaim upon release. At Metacritic, which assigns a normalized rating out of 100 to reviews from mainstream publications, the album received an average score of 86, based on 6 reviews, indicating "universal acclaim".

=== Accolades ===
Over It won 2020 Album of the Year at the Soul Train Music Awards and was the most streamed album by a female artist on Apple Music in 2020.

Year	Ceremony	Category	Result	Ref.
2020	American Music Awards	Favorite Album – Soul/R&B	Nominated	
2020	Soul Train Music Awards	Album of the Year	Won	
2021	Billboard Music Awards	Top R&B Album	Nominated	

Year-end lists
Publication	List	Rank	Ref.
Associated Press	AP's Top Albums of 2019	2	
Billboard	The 50 Best Albums of 2019	21	
Complex	The Best Albums of 2019	43	
Rolling Stone	The 50 Best Albums of 2019	38	
Uproxx	The Best Albums of 2019	19	
Variety	The Best Albums of 2019	8	

== Commercial performance ==
Over It debuted at number two on the US Billboard 200 with 134,000 album-equivalent units in its first week. Its debut week marked the largest streaming week for an R&B album by a female artist, in terms of on-demand audio streams. It went on to spend more than 200 weeks on Billboard 200, ranking as the second most successful R&B album of 2019. The album also topped the R&B Albums chart for 14 nonconsecutive weeks and as of July 2020, has yet to chart below number seven. On May 7, 2020, the album was certified platinum by the Recording Industry Association of America (RIAA) for combined sales and album-equivalent units over 1,000,000 units in the United States. As of November 2021, Over It had earned 2,500,000 equivalent copies in the U.S. On May 16, 2023, every song from the project had been certified gold or higher. On October 1, 2024, three days ahead of Over It's fifth anniversary, the album was updated to 3× Platinum by the RIAA.

== Track listing ==
Over It track listing
No.	Title	Writer(s)	Producer(s)	Length
1.	"Over It"	Summer Walker; Aubrey Robinson; London Holmes; Kendall Roark Bailey; Alexandra Tjernagel; Cooper McGill; Karim Hutton	London on da Track; Robinson^{[c]}; Bailey^{[c]}	2:11
2.	"Body"	Walker; Jocelyn Donald; Holmes; Bailey; Robinson; Donell Jones; Shah Rukh Zaman Khan; Rodrick Moore; Dijon MacFarlane ^{[d]}	London on da Track; Robinson^{[c]}; Bailey^{[c]}	3:13
3.	"Playing Games" (extended version) (with Bryson Tiller)	Walker; Holmes; Bailey; Robinson; LeToya Luckett^{[e]}; Kelendria Rowland^{[e]}; Beyoncé Knowles^{[e]}; LaTavia Roberson^{[e]}; Fred Jerkins III^{[e]}; Rodney Jerkins^{[e]}; LaShawn Daniels^{[e]}; Cameron Griffin; Bryson Tiller	London on da Track	2:23
4.	"Drunk Dialing...LODT"	Walker; Griffin; Bailey; Robinson; Holmes; Kevin Richardson	London on da Track; Robinson^{[c]}; Bailey^{[c]}; Griffin^{[c]}; Richardson^{[c]}	2:14
5.	"Come Thru" (with Usher)	Walker; Nija Charles; Robinson; Bailey; Holmes; Jermaine Dupri^{[f]}; Usher Raymond IV^{[f]}; Manuel Seal Jr.^{[f]}	London on da Track; Robinson^{[c]}; Bailey^{[c]}; Ben Chang^{[v]}	3:01
6.	"Potential"	Walker; Charles; Bailey; Holmes; Robinson; Kevin Cossom	London on da Track; Robinson^{[c]}; Bailey^{[c]}	2:53
7.	"Fun Girl"	Walker	Walker	1:49
8.	"Tonight"	Walker; Charles; Cossom; Ricki Glass; Robinson; Holmes	London on da Track; Robinson^{[c]}; Bailey^{[c]}; Fallen^{[c]}	2:56
9.	"Me"	Walker; Arsenio Archer	Archer	2:08
10.	"Like It" (with 6lack)	Walker; Bailey; Chris Brown; Robinson; Hector Caparro; Charles; Holmes; Ricardo Valentine; Stashenko	London on da Track; Robinson^{[c]}; Bailey^{[c]}; Fallen^{[c]}	2:51
11.	"Just Might" (with PartyNextDoor)	Walker; Archer; Jahron Brathwaite; Ryan Martinez; Joshua Parker	Archer; G. Ry^{[c]}; OG Parker^{[c]}	3:25
12.	"Stretch You Out" (featuring A Boogie wit da Hoodie)	Walker; Artist Dubose; Holmes; Vojtěch Daníček; Bailey; Robinson	London on da Track; Robinson^{[c]}; Bailey^{[c]}; Zane98^{[a]}	2:23
13.	"Off of You"	Walker; Holmes; Griffin; Bailey; Robinson; Stashenko	London on da Track; Robinson^{[c]}; Bailey^{[c]}; Fallen^{[c]}	2:05
14.	"Anna Mae"	Walker; Holmes; Bernard Harvey; Scott Storch; Bailey; Robinson	London on da Track; Bailey^{[c]}; Storch^{[c]}	2:17
15.	"I'll Kill You" (featuring Jhené Aiko)	Walker; Holmes; Jhené Chilombo; Storch; Bailey; Robinson	London on da Track; Robinson^{[c]}; Bailey^{[c]}; Storch^{[c]}	2:59
16.	"Nobody Else"	Walker; Holmes; Bailey; Robinson; Steven Jordan	London on da Track; Robinson^{[c]}; Bailey^{[c]}; Stevie J^{[c]}	3:53
17.	"Playing Games"	Walker; Holmes; Bailey; Robinson; Luckett^{[e]}; Rowland^{[e]}; Knowles^{[e]}; Roberson^{[e]}; F. Jerkins^{[e]}; R. Jerkins^{[e]}; Daniels; Griffin	London on da Track	2:23
18.	"Girls Need Love" (remix) (with Drake)	Walker; Archer; Aubrey Graham	Archer	3:42
Total length:				48:54

Notes

- ^{^[c]} indicates a co-producer
- ^{^[a]} indicates an additional producer
- ^{^[v]} indicates a vocal producer

Sample credits

- ^{^[d]} "Body" contains a sample from "Get It Together", written by Donell Jones, as performed by 702, and "Ballin'", written by Shah Rukh Zaman Khan, Rodrick Moore and Dijon Macfarlane, as performed by Mustard and Roddy Ricch.
- ^{^[e]} "Playing Games" interpolates "Say My Name", written by LaShawn Daniels, Rodney Jerkins, Fred Jerkins III, Beyoncé Knowles, LeToya Luckett, LaTavia Roberson, and Kelly Rowland, as performed by Destiny's Child.
- "Drunk Dialing...LODT" interpolates "Cause I Love You", written by Lenny Williams and Michael Bennett, as performed by Lenny Williams.
- ^{^[f]} "Come Thru" contains samples from "You Make Me Wanna...", written by Usher Raymond IV, Jermaine Dupri, and Manuel Seal, as performed by Usher.

== Personnel ==
Credits adapted from Tidal.

Musicians

- Summer Walker – vocals
- Aubrey Robinson – keyboards (1, 2, 8, 13, 16)
- Usher – vocals (5)
- Khalid – vocals (6)
- Lee Stashenko – guitar (8, 13)
- 6LACK – vocals (10)
- PartyNextDoor – rap vocals (11)
- A Boogie wit da Hoodie – rap vocals (12)
- Scott Storch – keyboards (14)
- Jhené Aiko – vocals (15)
- Stevie J – bass and keyboards (16)

Technical

- Nicolas De Porcel – mastering engineer
- Cyrus "NOIS" Taghipour – mixer (1, 2, 4–16)
- Derek "MixedByAli" Ali – mixer (1, 2, 4–16)
- Jaycen Joshua – mixer (3, 17)
- Summer Walker – recording engineer
- Kendall Roark Bailey – recording engineer (1, 2, 4–6, 8, 12–16)
- Ben Chang – recording engineer (5)
- Archer – recording engineer (9, 10)
- Ben Chang – vocal producer (5)
- Ashley Jacobson – assistant recording engineer (5)

== Charts ==
=== Weekly charts ===
Weekly chart performance for Over It
Chart (2019)	Peak position
Australian Albums (ARIA)	17
Belgian Albums (Ultratop Flanders)	31
Belgian Albums (Ultratop Wallonia)	78
Canadian Albums (Billboard)	4
Dutch Albums (Album Top 100)	14
French Albums (SNEP)	63
Irish Albums (IRMA)	32
New Zealand Albums (RMNZ)	16
Swiss Albums (Schweizer Hitparade)	56
UK Albums (Official Charts)	7
US Billboard 200	2
US Top R&B/Hip-Hop Albums (Billboard)	1
US Indie Store Album Sales (Billboard)	23

=== Year-end charts ===
Year-end chart performance for Over It
Chart (2019)	Position
US Billboard 200	109
US Top R&B/Hip-Hop Albums (Billboard)	41
Chart (2020)	Position
US Billboard 200	17
US Top R&B/Hip-Hop Albums (Billboard)	9
Chart (2021)	Position
US Billboard 200	59
US Top R&B/Hip-Hop Albums (Billboard)	29
Chart (2022)	Position
US Billboard 200	79
US Top R&B/Hip-Hop Albums (Billboard)	52
Chart (2023)	Position
US Billboard 200	110
Chart (2024)	Position
US Billboard 200	124
US Top R&B/Hip-Hop Albums (Billboard)	70
Chart (2025)	Position
US Billboard 200	135
US Top R&B/Hip-Hop Albums (Billboard)	97

== Certifications ==
Certifications for Over It
Region	Certification	Certified units/sales
Australia (ARIA)	Gold	35,000^{‡}
Canada (Music Canada)	Platinum	80,000^{‡}
Denmark (IFPI Danmark)	Gold	10,000^{‡}
France (SNEP)	Gold	50,000^{‡}
New Zealand (RMNZ)	Platinum	15,000^{‡}
United Kingdom (BPI)	Platinum	300,000^{‡}
United States (RIAA)	3× Platinum	3,000,000^{‡}
^{‡} Sales+streaming figures based on certification alone.
