= Girls Need Love =

2018 song by Summer Walker

- Remix cover

Single by Summer Walker

from the album Last Day of Summer
- Released: July 26, 2018: February 10, 2019 (remix)
- Recorded: 2018
- Length: 2:20: 3:42 (remix)
- Label: LoveRenaissance; Interscope; OVO (remix)
- Songwriters: Summer Walker; Arsenio Archer; Aubrey Graham (remix)
- Producer: Arsenio Archer

Summer Walker singles chronology
"CPR" (2018)	"Girls Need Love" (2018)	"Playing Games" (2019)

Drake singles chronology
"Going Bad" (2019)	"Girls Need Love" (Remix) (2019)	"No Guidance" (2019)

Music video
- "Girls Need Love" on YouTube

"Girls Need Love" is a song by American singer Summer Walker from her debut commercial mixtape, Last Day of Summer (2018). It was released as the album's lead single on July 26, 2018. It received a release of a remix version with Drake on February 10, 2019, later included on her debut album Over It (2019). The song has since then received an extended play in October 2023 titled "Girls Need Love" (Girls Mix), with remixes from singers Victoria Monét, Tyla, and Tink.

== Charts ==
=== Weekly charts ===
Weekly chart performance for Girls Need Love
Chart (2018–2019)	Peak position
New Zealand Hot Singles (RMNZ)	25
US Bubbling Under Hot 100 (Billboard)	6
US Bubbling Under R&B/Hip-Hop Singles (Billboard)	1
US Hot R&B Songs (Billboard)	8

=== Weekly charts ===
Weekly chart performance for Girls Need Love (Remix)
Chart (2019)	Peak position
Australia (ARIA)	78
Canada Hot 100 (Billboard)	45
Ireland (IRMA)	70
Lithuania (AGATA)	52
New Zealand Hot Singles (RMNZ)	8
Portugal (AFP)	99
UK Singles (OCC)	41
US Billboard Hot 100	37
US Hot R&B/Hip-Hop Songs (Billboard)	16
US Rolling Stone Top 100	57

=== Year-end charts ===
Chart (2019)	Position
US Hot R&B/Hip-Hop Songs (Billboard)	48

== Certifications ==
Certifications for "Girls Need Love"
Region	Certification	Certified units/sales
Brazil (Pro-Música Brasil)	Diamond	160,000^{‡}
New Zealand (RMNZ)	4× Platinum	120,000^{‡}
Spain (Promusicae)	Gold	30,000^{‡}
United States (RIAA)	9× Platinum	9,000,000^{‡}
^{‡} Sales+streaming figures based on certification alone.

Certifications for "Girls Need Love" (Remix)
Region	Certification	Certified units/sales
Australia (ARIA)	3× Platinum	210,000^{‡}
Canada (Music Canada)	3× Platinum	240,000^{‡}
Denmark (IFPI Danmark)	Gold	45,000^{‡}
Portugal (AFP)	Platinum	10,000^{‡}
United Kingdom (BPI)	2× Platinum	1,200,000^{‡}
^{‡} Sales+streaming figures based on certification alone.
