= Woptober =

Mixtape by Gucci Mane
- Released: October 14, 2016
- Recorded: 2016
- Genres: Hip hop; trap
- Length: 43:32
- Labels: Atlantic; GUWOP
- Producers: Gucci Mane (exec.); Cubeatz; Drumma Boy; Honorable C.N.O.T.E.; London on da Track; Metro Boomin; Southside; TM88; Will-A-Fool; Zaytoven

Gucci Mane chronology
Everybody Looking (2016)	Woptober (2016)	Free Bricks 2: Zone 6 Edition (2016)

Singles from Woptober
- 1. "Bling Blaww Burr" Released: September 20, 2016

Woptober (stylized in all caps) is a commercial mixtape by American rapper Gucci Mane. It was released on October 14, 2016, by Atlantic Records and GUWOP Enterprises. The album features guest appearances from Rick Ross and Young Dolph, as well as the production that was provided by London on da Track, Honorable C.N.O.T.E., Zaytoven, Will-A-Fool, Southside, Metro Boomin and Drumma Boy, among others.

== Singles ==
The album's lead single, "Bling Blaww Burr", was released on September 20, 2016. The song features a guest appearance from American rapper Young Dolph, while the production was provided by Metro Boomin.

=== Promotional singles ===
The album's first promotional single, "Icy Lil Bitch", was released on October 11, 2016. The song was produced by Zaytoven.

== Track listing ==
Credits adapted from Tidal and ASCAP.

No.	Title	Writer(s)	Producer(s)	Length
1.	"Intro: Fuck 12"	Radric Davis; London Holmes	London on da Track	2:41
2.	"Aggressive"	Davis; Bryan Simmons	TM88; Zaytoven	3:36
3.	"The Left"	Davis; Willie Byrd	Will-A-Fool	3:39
4.	"Money Machine" (featuring Rick Ross)	Davis; Carlton Mays, Jr.; William Roberts II	Honorable C.N.O.T.E.	3:46
5.	"Dirty Lil Nigga"	Davis; Leland Wayne; Joshua Luellen	Metro Boomin; Southside	3:56
6.	"Wop"	Davis; Holmes	London on da Track	2:57
7.	"Right on Time"	Davis; Dotson	Zaytoven	2:37
8.	"Bling Blaww Burr" (featuring Young Dolph)	Davis; Wayne; Adolph Thornton, Jr.	Metro Boomin	3:25
9.	"Icy Lil Bitch"	Davis; Dotson	Zaytoven	2:45
10.	"Love Her Body"	Davis; Wayne; Dotson	Metro Boomin; Zaytoven	3:46
11.	"Hi-Five"	Davis; Wayne; Kevin Gomringer; Tim Gomringer	Metro Boomin; Cubeatz	3:09
12.	"Out the Zoo"	Davis; Christopher Gholson	Drumma Boy	4:03
13.	"Addicted"	Davis; Byrd	Will-A-Fool	3:12
Total length:				43:32

== Personnel ==
Credits adapted from Tidal.

Technical

- Colin Leonard – mastering (all tracks)
- Kori Anders – mixing (all tracks)
- Sean Paine – recording (all tracks)

== Charts ==
Chart (2016)	Peak position
US Billboard 200	43
