= LaLaLa (Black Coffee and Usher song) =

Single by Usher & Black Coffee
- Released: September 10, 2019
- Recorded: 2018
- Genre: Afro house
- Length: 3:39
- Label: Ultra
- Songwriters: Black Coffee; Lucky Daye; Usher Raymond IV
- Producer: Black Coffee

Black Coffee singles chronology
| "Get it Together" (2018) | "LaLaLa" (2019) |

Usher singles chronology
| "Party" (2016) | "LaLaLa" (2019) | "Don't Waste My Time" (2019) |

"LaLaLa" is an afro house song by South African DJ Black Coffee and American singer Usher. It is the first collaboration between the two. In 2018, they appeared together for the first time at the Global Citizen Festival.

Black Coffee had briefly published segments of the song in December 2018 on his Instagram page.

== Commercial performance ==
The song was released on September 10, 2019, and peaked at number one on the South Africa Airplay Charts Radio Monitor chart. It is Usher's first number one in South Africa.

== Chart performance ==
| Chart (2019) | Peak position |
|---|---|
| Belgium (Ultratop Dance) | 25 |
| South Africa (Radio Monitor) | 1 |
