= Artist 2.0 =

Studio album by A Boogie wit da Hoodie
- Released: February 14, 2020
- Recorded: 2019–2020
- Genres: Hip-hop; R&B
- Length: 59:03
- Labels: Atlantic; Highbridge
- Producers: Artist Dubose (exec.); Quincy "QD" Acheampong (also exec.); Sambou "Bubba" Camara (also exec.); Andrew Watt; DLo Beatz; Band on the Beat; Billboard Hitmakers; Boi-1da; boobie; Carter Lang; Denis Kosiak; Go Grizzly; Hitmaka; Jahaan Sweet; JoeFromYO; Khirye Tyler; Larrance Dopson; London on da Track; Louis Bell; Matthew Spatola; BKH Beats; Murda Beatz; Nick Mira; Pooh Beatz; S.Dot; SephGotTheWaves; Sool Got Hits; Squat Beats; Tash Phillips; Westen Weiss; Wheezy; YoungKio

A Boogie wit da Hoodie chronology
Hoodie SZN (2018)	Artist 2.0 (2020)	B4 AVA (2021)

Deluxe edition cover

Singles from Artist 2.0
- 1. "Mood Swings" Released: September 13, 2019; 2. "Reply" Released: November 15, 2019; 3. "King of My City" Released: January 31, 2020; 4. "Numbers" Released: March 31, 2020; 5. "Bleed" Released: June 16, 2020

Artist 2.0 is the third studio album by American rapper A Boogie wit da Hoodie. It was released on February 14, 2020, by Highbridge and Atlantic Records. and contains features from Young Thug, Roddy Ricch, Gunna, London on da Track, DaBaby, Trap Manny, Summer Walker, Khalid, and Lil Uzi Vert. The deluxe edition of the album was released on June 19, 2020. It features an additional guest appearance from his firstborn daughter, Melody Valentine Dubose. The album was a commercial success, peaking at number two on the US Billboard 200. The release of the standard version coincides with the four year anniversary of A Boogie’s debut mixtape Artist (2016).

== Background ==
A Boogie first announced the album in December 2018 with an original February 2019 release date before being pushed back. The day before release, A Boogie revealed the cover art and track listing for the album on his Instagram page, also revealing features from Young Thug, Roddy Ricch, Gunna, London on da Track, DaBaby, Trap Manny, Summer Walker, Khalid and Lil Uzi Vert.

== Release and promotion ==
=== Singles ===
On September 13, 2019, A Boogie released a buzz single titled "Mood Swings". It debuted at number 76 on the Billboard Hot 100. It was followed by "Reply", featuring Lil Uzi Vert, on November 15. It debuted and peaked at number 49 on the Hot 100.

On January 31, 2020, he released "King of My City", debuting at number 69 on the Hot 100.

"Numbers" featuring Roddy Ricch, Gunna and London on da Track was sent to US rhythmic contemporary radio on March 31, 2020. The song debuted and peaked at number 23 on the Hot 100.

As part of the album's deluxe edition, "Bleed" was released as the official lead single, along with a video.

=== Teaser ===
On February 11, 2019, A Boogie released a teaser trailer on his YouTube channel.

== Critical reception ==
Artist 2.0 divided music critics. iHeart praised the album as A Boogie's "most authentic project yet," noting its exploration of various genres, including rock, R&B, and jazz, reflecting his true self. Ratings Game Music commended the deluxe edition for its dynamic flows, infectious melodies, and personal storytelling, particularly highlighting tracks like "Bleed" and "It's Crazy". Some reviewers noted that the album's sound became repetitive by track 10, with limited variation in style and production. Critics pointed out that the album offered little new to fans, with some suggesting that the deluxe edition tracks were not strong enough to redeem the overall project.

== Commercial performance ==
Artist 2.0 debuted at number two on the US Billboard 200 chart, earning 111,000 album-equivalent units (including 3,000 copies in pure album sales) in its first week. This became A Boogie's third US top-ten debut on the chart. The album also accumulated a total of 149 million in on-demand streams of songs from the album. In its second week, the album dropped to number six on the chart, earning an additional 57,000 units. On the chart dated July 4, 2020, the album returned to the top 10 (climbing from number 80 to number three) following the release of its deluxe version, selling 43,000 units. As of December 2020, the album has earned 774,000 album-equivalent units in the US. On July 30, 2021, the album was certified platinum by the Recording Industry Association of America (RIAA) for combined sales and album-equivalent units of over one million units in the United States.

== Track listing ==
No.	Title	Writer(s)	Producer(s)	Length
1.	"Thug Love"	Artist Dubose; London Holmes; Matthew Spatola; Shaun Thomas	S. Dot; London on da Track; Matthew Spatola	3:01
2.	"Cinderella Story"	Dubose; Aubrey Robsinson; Carter Lang; Erika Taylor; Jahaan Sweet; Janet Sewell; Kevin Risto; Louis Biancaniello; Samuel Watters; Waynne Jason Nugent; Westen Weiss	Boobie; Carter Lang; Jahaan Sweet; Westen Weiss	3:05
3.	"Me and My Guitar"	Dubose; Andrew Wotman; Louis Bell	Louis Bell; Andrew Watt	2:41
4.	"Might Not Give Up" (featuring Young Thug)	Dubose; Jeffery Williams; Algernod Washington; LaDamon Douglas; Nicholas Mira; Radric Davis	Nick Mira	3:45
5.	"Numbers" (featuring Roddy Ricch, Gunna and London on da Track)	Dubose; Rodrick Moore, Jr.; Sergio Kitchens; Holmes	London on da Track; Dez Wright	3:08
6.	"Stain" (featuring DaBaby)	Dubose; Jonathan Kirk; Chris Jones; Darryl Clemons; Julius Rivera III; Kevin Andre Price; Morris Jones	Go Grizzly; Pooh Beatz; Squat Beats	2:55
7.	"Hit 'Em Up" (featuring Trap Manny)	Dubose; Emmanuel Cobbs; Damil Coste; Joseph Boyden; Joseph Zoumboulias	SephGotTheWaves; DLo Beatz; JoeFromYO	3:24
8.	"DTB 4 Life"	Dubose; Coste; Boyden; Zoumboulias; Robert Kelly	JoeFromYO; SephGotTheWaves	2:55
9.	"Calm Down (Bittersweet)" (featuring Summer Walker)	Dubose; Summer Walker; Nija Charles; Holmes	Dez Wright; London on da Track	3:03
10.	"Another Day Gone" (featuring Khalid)	Dubose; Khalid Robinson; Caleb Dunlap; Denis Kosiak; Khirye Tyler; Larrance Dopson	Denis Kosiak; Larrance Dopson; Khirye Tyler	3:08
11.	"Good Girls Gone Bad"	Dubose; Coste; Douglas Gibbs; Eamon Jonathan Doyle; Sweet; Zoumboulias; Kirk Robinson; Mark Passy; Ralph Johnson; Shawn Carter	Jahaan Sweet; DLo Beatz; JoeFromYO	1:45
12.	"Blood on My Denim"	Dubose; Coste; Zoumboulias	JoeFromYO	3:16
13.	"R.O.D."	Dubose; Coste; Zoumboulias; Kiowa Roukema; Leroy Jones; Matthew Samuels; Rashia Fisher; Ricardo Thomas; Roger McNair; S. Thomas; Trevor Smith; William Lewis	TT Audi; S.Dot; Boi-1da; JoeFromYO; YoungKio	3:34
14.	"Big Shit"	Dubose; Rasool Diaz; Shane Lindstrom	Murda Beatz; Rasool Diaz	2:32
15.	"Right Back"	Dubose; Christian Ward; Eduardo Burgess; Etterlene Jordan; Jonathan de la Rosa; Rivera; Price	Hitmaka; Go Grizzly; Billboard Hitmakers; Squat Beats	2:42
16.	"Luv Is Art" (featuring Lil Uzi Vert)	Dubose; Symere Woods; Coste; Boyden; Zoumboulias	SephGotTheWaves; JLo Beatz; JoeFromYO	2:41
17.	"King of My City"	Dubose; Coste; Zoumboulias; Samuels; S. Thomas	S.Dot; Boi-1da; DLo Beatz; JoeFromYO	2:28
18.	"Mood Swings"	Dubose; Wesley Glass	Wheezy	2:36
19.	"Reply" (featuring Lil Uzi Vert)	Dubose; Woods; Zoumboulias; Price	Go Grizzly; JoeFromYO	3:03
20.	"Streets Don't Love You"	Dubose; Sweet; Tash Phillips	Tash Phillips; Jahaan Sweet	3:21
Total length:				59:03

Artist 2.0 deluxe edition bonus tracks
No.	Title	Writer(s)	Producer(s)	Length
21.	"It's Crazy" (featuring Melody)	Dubose; Dean Maola; Graham Maola	Mosaic Music; Santino	2:15
22.	"Bleed"	Dubose; S. Thomas; Zoumboulias	S.Dot; JoeFromYO	2:57
23.	"Till The Wheels Fall Off"	Dubose; Spatola; S. Thomas; Zoumboulias	S.Dot; JoeFromYO; Matt Spatola	3:03
24.	"7 Mac 11's"	Dubose; S. Thomas	S.Dot	2:50
25.	"Secrets"	Dubose; S. Thomas; D. Maola	Mosaic Music; S.Dot	2:13
26.	"Memories"	Dubose; Coste	DLo Beatz	3:31
27.	"Act Like That"	Dubose; Sweet; Tyrese Gibson; Harvey Mason; Damon Thomas; Eric Dawkins; Beyoncé Knowles; Kelendria Rowland; LeToya Luckett; LaTavia Roberson; Rodney Jerkins; Freddie Jerkins; LaShawn Daniels	Jahaan Sweet	2:43
28.	"Into It"	Dubose; Zoumboulias; Coste	DLo Beatz; JoeFromYO	2:27
29.	"Talk About It"	Dubose; Christopher Dotson; Zoumboulias; Coste	DLo Beatz; JoeFromYo; SAINT MINO	2:51
Total length:				83:21

== Charts ==
=== Weekly charts ===
Chart performance for Artist 2.0
Chart (2020)	Peak position
Australian Albums (ARIA)	39
Belgian Albums (Ultratop Flanders)	39
Belgian Albums (Ultratop Wallonia)	178
Canadian Albums (Billboard)	4
Danish Albums (Hitlisten)	24
Dutch Albums (Album Top 100)	10
French Albums (SNEP)	110
German Albums (Offizielle Top 100)	100
Irish Albums (Official Charts)	24
New Zealand Albums (RMNZ)	24
Norwegian Albums (VG-lista)	14
Swedish Albums (Sverigetopplistan)	48
Swiss Albums (Schweizer Hitparade)	35
UK Albums (Official Charts)	11
US Billboard 200	2
US Top R&B/Hip-Hop Albums (Billboard)	2

=== Year-end charts ===
2020 year-end chart performance for Artist 2.0
Chart (2020)	Position
US Billboard 200	48
US Top R&B/Hip-Hop Albums (Billboard)	32

== Certifications ==
Certifications for Artist 2.0
Region	Certification	Certified units/sales
Canada (Music Canada)	Platinum	80,000^{‡}
New Zealand (RMNZ)	Gold	7,500^{‡}
United Kingdom (BPI)	Silver	60,000^{‡}
United States (RIAA)	Platinum	1,000,000^{‡}
^{‡} Sales+streaming figures based on certification alone.
