= Pulldown =

Pulldown may refer to:

- Pulldown (casting), a type of casting defect
- Pull-down resistor, a type of resistor use
- Pull-down assay, a biochemical protein extraction technique
- Pull-down menu. See Menu (computing)

== Fitness ==
- Pulldown exercise, a compound exercise designed to stress and develop the Latissimus dorsi.
- A mark (Australian football)

== Media ==
- Negative pulldown, the difference between 2-, 3-, and 4-perf movie camera frame movements
- Pull-down curtain
- Telecine, the methods of 3:2 pulldown in video conversion

== See also ==
- Pull up (disambiguation)
