= Last Day of Summer (mixtape) =

Mixtape by Summer Walker
- Released: October 19, 2018
- Recorded: 2018
- Genre: Alternative R&B
- Length: 28:21
- Labels: LVRN; Interscope
- Producers: Arsenio Archer; Gambi; Thym; Tim Maxey

Summer Walker chronology
Last Day of Summer (2018)	Over It (2019)

Singles from Last Day of Summer
- 1. "CPR" Released: April 5, 2018; 2. "Girls Need Love" Released: July 26, 2018

Last Day of Summer is the debut mixtape by American singer and songwriter Summer Walker. It was released on October 19, 2018, by Love Renaissance (LVRN) and Interscope Records.

== Singles ==
On April 5, 2018, she released the first single, called "CPR". On July 26, she released the second single, called "Girls Need Love". On February 27, 2019, she released a remix to "Girls Need Love", with Drake. The single charted at number 37 on the US Billboard Hot 100.

== Critical reception ==
Critics reviewed the mixtape well upon release. Vanyaland wrote that "Walker is ready and set for the next chapter of her life. Having been signed by LVRN accompanied by Interscope Records is enough proof that Walker’s resilience and motivation is paying off. Last Day Of Summer is a 12-song effort packed with nothing but female truth that for most would seem too provocative." Editor for DJBooth, Donna-Claire Chesman, mentioned that the album "brought it to jazzy life on her latest and most successful body of work" and "skimmed across a vast pool of emotion." Chuck Ramos for Ones To Watch commented on the album saying it "is a collection of songs that showcase the talented vocalist’s ability as a songwriter. Her debut is a transparent display of her thoughts and feelings on confidence, doubt, love and womanhood. Tapping into an array of styles for production, Walker shatters any preconceived ideas about her sound being one dimensional."

== Commercial performance ==
Last Day of Summer peaked at number 44 on the Billboard 200 chart and number 25 on the Top R&B/Hip-Hop Albums chart on November 3, 2018, selling 5,630 album-equivalent units in its first week.

== Track listing ==
No.	Title	Writer(s)	Producer(s)	Length
1.	"BP"	Summer Walker; Arsenio Archer	Arsenio Archer	1:49
2.	"Talk Yo Shit"	Walker; Archer	Arsenio Archer	0:39
3.	"Girls Need Love"	Walker; Archer	Arsenio Archer	2:20
4.	"CPR"	Walker; Jacob Gamboa	Gambi	3:23
5.	"Smartwater"	Walker; Archer	Arsenio Archer	2:24
6.	"Deep"	Walker; Archer	Arsenio Archer	1:32
7.	"Baby"	Walker; Archer	Gambi	1:28
8.	"I'm There"	Walker; Tim Maxey; Archer	Tim Maxey; Arsenio Archer	1:54
9.	"Karma"	Walker; Archer	Arsenio Archer	3:08
10.	"Prayed Up"	Walker; Tim Maxey; Archer	Tim Maxey; Arsenio Archer	2:48
11.	"Shame"	Walker; Thym Appleboom	Thym	2:46
12.	"Just Like Me"	Walker; Archer	Arsenio Archer	4:10
Total length:				28:21

Streaming edition
No.	Title	Writer(s)	Producer(s)	Length
13.	"Girls Need Love (Remix)" (with Drake)	Summer Walker; Arsenio Archer; Aubrey Graham	Arsenio Archer	3:42

== Charts ==
=== Weekly charts ===
Chart (2018–2019)	Peak position
Canadian Albums (Billboard)	72
US Billboard 200	44
US Top R&B/Hip-Hop Albums (Billboard)	25

=== Year-end charts ===
Chart (2019)	Position
US Billboard 200	187

== Certifications ==
Region	Certification	Certified units/sales
Denmark (IFPI Danmark)	Gold	10,000^{‡}
New Zealand (RMNZ)	Platinum	15,000^{‡}
United Kingdom (BPI)	Gold	100,000^{‡}
United States (RIAA)	Platinum	1,000,000^{‡}
^{‡} Sales+streaming figures based on certification alone.
