= Free Bricks 2: Zone 6 Edition =

Mixtape by Gucci Mane and Future
- Released: November 14, 2016
- Recorded: November 2016
- Genres: Hip-hop; trap
- Length: 19:55
- Labels: 1017; Freebandz
- Producers: Southside; London on da Track; Metro Boomin; Zaytoven

Gucci Mane chronology
Woptober (2016)	Free Bricks 2: Zone 6 Edition (2016)	1017 vs. the World (2016)

Future chronology
Evol (2016)	Free Bricks 2: Zone 6 Edition (2016)	Future (2017)

Free Bricks 2: Zone 6 Edition is the second collaborative mixtape by American rappers Gucci Mane and Future. It was released on November 14, 2016, by Freebandz and 1017 Records as a free download. It follows their first collaborative project Free Bricks from 2011.

== Background ==
In an interview with MissInfo.net, Gucci Mane said that the mixtape was released less than 24 hours after the recording:

"Last night, me and Future met up in Atlanta. We ditched our entourages, we didn't book my usual studio, or his usual studio...These joints ain't even 24 hours old. That's like bringing you in the studio with us".

== Critical reception ==
Free Bricks 2 received a score of 6.9 out of 10 from Paul A. Thompson of Pitchfork, who added that it "will likely get lost in the shuffle, but it's the sound of two superlative talents working without boundaries".

== Track listing ==
No.	Title	Writer(s)	Producer(s)	Length
1.	"RR Trucks"	Radric Davis; Nayvadius Wilburn; Joshua Luellen	Southside	3:10
2.	"Selling Heroin"	Davis; Wilburn; Luellen; London Holmes	Southside; London on da Track	4:07
3.	"Die a Gangsta"	Davis; Wilburn; Luellen; Leland Wayne	Southside; Metro Boomin	3:42
4.	"Kind a Dope"	Davis; Wilburn; Xavier Dotson	Zaytoven	2:46
5.	"All Shooters"	Davis; Wilburn; Luellen; Wayne	Southside; Metro Boomin	2:41
6.	"Zone 6"	Davis; Wilburn; Dotson	Zaytoven	3:29
Total length:				19:55
