= Don't Waste My Time (Usher song) =

Single by Usher featuring Ella Mai
- Released: December 13, 2019
- Recorded: 2019
- Length: 3:20
- Label: Brand Usher, RCA
- Songwriters: Usher Raymond; Wilbard "VEDO" McCoy III; Jermaine Dupri; Bryan-Michael Cox; Ella Mai; Christopher Allen Jones
- Producers: Jermaine Dupri; Bryan-Michael Cox

Usher singles chronology
| "LaLaLa" (2019) | "Don't Waste My Time" (2019) | "Come Thru" (2020) |

Ella Mai singles chronology
| "Put It All on Me" (2019) | "Don't Waste My Time" (2019) | "Not Another Love Song" (2020) |

Music video
- "Don't Waste My Time" on YouTube

"Don't Waste My Time" is a song by American singer-songwriter Usher featuring British singer-songwriter Ella Mai. The song was first uploaded to SoundCloud on November 19, 2019, although it was officially released by RCA Records on December 13, 2019 to online music stores and streaming services. The song was written by the artists alongside Vedo, Christopher Allen Jones, and producers Jermaine Dupri and Bryan Michael-Cox. The song takes inspiration in part from "I Like the Way (The Kissing Game)" (1990) by American R&B quintet Hi-Five and "Show You the Way to Go" (1976) by American family group the Jacksons.

== Background and release ==
Usher has been in the studio working on the sequel to Confessions. In March 2019, he posted a picture of himself in the studio next to a whiteboard with the words "Confessions 2" and a blurred out tracklisting. The following day Jermaine Dupri, who produced the original Confessions went live on Instagram and previewed new music. This is following his last collaborative album A, with Zaytoven. YouKnowIGotSoul exclusively premiere 'Don't Waste My Time" through SoundCloud. It was released for digital download on iTunes, Amazon, Google Play and online streaming services, Tidal, Apple Music, Spotify, and YouTube on December 13, 2019.

== Music video ==
The music video for "Don't Waste My Time" was directed by LeSean Harris. It was released on March 25, 2020. It features cameos from Snoop Dogg, Jamie Kennedy, Eric Bellinger, Jermaine Dupri, Evan Ross, Christian Combs, and Justin Combs As of June 2024 the video has over 50 million views on YouTube.

== Live performances ==
Usher, Ella Mai, and Jermaine Dupri performed the song for the first time on BET's SOS: Saving Ourselves - A BET Covid 19 Relief Special, benefiting African American Communities Impacted By Coronavirus on April 22, 2020.

== Credits and personnel ==
Credits adapted from Tidal.

- Usher – vocals, lyrics
- Ella Mai – vocals, lyrics
- Jermaine Dupri – lyrics, production, mixing engineer
- Bryan-Michael Cox – lyrics, production
- Wilbard "VEDO" McCoy III – lyrics
- Christopher Allen Jones – lyrics
- Colin Leonard – mastering engineer
- Bill Zimmerman – assistant engineer
- Phil Tan – mixing engineer

== Charts ==
| Chart (2019–2020) | Peak position |
|---|---|
| New Zealand Hot Singles (RMNZ) | 19 |
| South Africa (Radiomonitor) | 49 |
| US Bubbling Under Hot 100 (Billboard) | 7 |
| US Digital Song Sales (Billboard) | 43 |
| US R&B/Hip-Hop Airplay (Billboard) | 12 |
| US Adult R&B Songs (Billboard) | 1 |

== Certifications ==
| Region | Certification | Certified units/sales |
|---|---|---|
| United States (RIAA) | Gold | 500,000^{‡} |
^{‡} Sales+streaming figures based on certification alone.
