= Playing Games =

2019 song by Summer Walker

Single by Summer Walker

from the album Over It
- Released: August 23, 2019
- Recorded: 2018–2019
- Genre: R&B
- Length: 2:23 (extended version) (with Bryson Tiller); 2:23 (album version)
- Label: LoveRenaissance; Interscope
- Songwriters: Summer Walker; London Holmes; Roark Bailey; Aubrey Robinson; LeToya Luckett; Kelly Rowland; Beyoncé Knowles; LaTavia Roberson; Fred Jerkins III; Rodney Jerkins; LaShawn Daniels; Cameron Griffin; Bryson Tiller
- Producer: London on da Track

Summer Walker singles chronology
"Girls Need Love (Remix)" (2019)	"Playing Games" (2019)	"Stretch You Out" (2019)

Bryson Tiller singles chronology
"Thru the Night" (2019)	"Playing Games" (2019)	"Hands on You" (2020)

Music video
- "Playing Games" on YouTube

"Playing Games" is a song by American singer Summer Walker from her debut studio album, Over It (2019). The song was released as the lead single from the album on August 23, 2019. The extended version features guest vocals from American singer Bryson Tiller. The song samples Destiny's Child's song "Say My Name" (1999).

== Critical reception ==
Alphonse Pierre of Pitchfork said that, in the song, Walker "addresses the lame dudes that continue to take their passion for granted" while not acknowledging "their relationship on Instagram". The Fader named it one of the best songs on Over It, reasoning their choice by stating that the chorus is a "full interpolation of one of Destiny’s Child’s most ubiquitous preachings" despite Walker not "phoning it in" and compared it to an old Nelly song.

== Music video ==
The music video was released on October 8, 2019, and was directed by Christine Yuan. Despite being featured on the extended version of the song, Bryson Tiller does not appear in the clip. The video features shots of Walker sitting and lying on a bed surrounded by bright city lights in the backdrop. During the video, Walker has one man tied up and hanging from the ceiling while another one is seen being confined to a chair. Being fed-up with lies, Walker goes on to ignore a man bringing them flowers and apologizing.

== Charts ==
=== Weekly charts ===
==== Original version ====
Chart (2019)	Peak position
Australia (ARIA)	83
Canada (Canadian Hot 100)	43
Ireland (IRMA)	76
New Zealand Hot Singles (RMNZ)	20
UK Singles (Official Charts)	24
UK Hip Hop/R&B (Official Charts)	16
US Billboard Hot 100	16
US Hot R&B/Hip-Hop Songs (Billboard)	9
US Rhythmic (Billboard)	37
US Rolling Stone Top 100	36

==== Extended version ====
Chart (2019)	Peak position
New Zealand Hot Singles (Recorded Music NZ)	15
US Rolling Stone Top 100	10

=== Year-end charts ===
==== Original version ====
Chart (2019)	Position
US Hot R&B/Hip-Hop Songs (Billboard)	75
Chart (2020)	Position
US Hot R&B/Hip-Hop Songs (Billboard)	64

== Certifications ==
Region	Certification	Certified units/sales
Australia (ARIA)	2× Platinum	140,000^{‡}
Brazil (Pro-Música Brasil)	Platinum	40,000^{‡}
Canada (Music Canada)	2× Platinum	160,000^{‡}
New Zealand (RMNZ)	3× Platinum	90,000^{‡}
United Kingdom (BPI)	Platinum	600,000^{‡}
United States (RIAA)	6× Platinum	6,000,000^{‡}
^{‡} Sales+streaming figures based on certification alone.

== Release history ==
Release history and formats for "Playing Games"
Country	Date	Format	Label	Ref.
Various	August 23, 2019	Digital download; streaming	LVRN; Interscope	
United States	October 1, 2019	Rhythmic contemporary radio	LVRN; Interscope	
