= Come Thru =

2019 single by Summer Walker and Usher

Single by Summer Walker and Usher

from the album Over It
- Released: January 14, 2020
- Recorded: 2019
- Length: 3:00
- Label: LoveRenaissance; Interscope
- Songwriters: Summer Walker; Nija Charles; Aubrey Robinson; Kendall Roark Bailey; London Holmes; Usher Raymond IV; Jermaine Dupri; Manuel Seal Jr.
- Producers: London on da Track; Jermaine Dupri

Summer Walker singles chronology
"Something Real" (2019)	"Come Thru" (2020)	"Secret" (2020)

Usher singles chronology
"Don't Waste My Time" (2019)	"Come Thru" (2020)	"SexBeat" (2020)

"Come Thru" is a song by American singers Summer Walker and Usher. The song was released as the third single from Walker's debut album Over It, on January 14, 2020. It peaked at number forty-two on both the Billboard Hot 100 and the UK Singles Chart. The single has been certified Gold in the United States. It samples the 1997 song "You Make Me Wanna..." by Usher.

== Music video ==
The music video for "Come Thru" was directed by Lacey Duke and it premiered on January 7, 2020. This video was shot at the 285 Flea Market in Atlanta, Georgia, the hometown where both singers are from. The video features shots of Walker riding on the back of a motorcycle, inside of the flea market, and pictured with London on da Track, who also produced the record. Usher is seen inside the Flea Mart singing to a woman and on the outside doing choreography from the original video. Jermaine Dupri makes a cameo alongside Usher in the video. The music video on YouTube has received over 16 million views as of March 2025.

== Credits and personnel ==
Credits adapted from Tidal.

- Summer Walker – vocals, lyrics
- Usher – vocals, associated performer, lyrics
- London on da Track – lyrics, production
- Jermaine Dupri – lyrics, production
- Manuel Seal – lyrics
- Nija Charles – lyrics
- Ben Change – associated performer
- Kendall Roark Bailey – lyrics, production
- Aubrey Robinson – lyrics, production
- Nicolas De Porcel – mastering engineer
- Ashley Jacobson – assistant engineer
- Derek "MixedByAli" Ali – mixing engineer
- Cyrus "NOIS" Taghipour – mixing engineer
- Danny Blair - production

== Charts ==
=== Weekly charts ===
Chart (2019–2020)	Peak position
Canada Hot 100 (Billboard)	65
New Zealand Hot Singles (RMNZ)	12
UK Singles (OCC)	42
UK Hip Hop/R&B (Official Charts)	28
US Billboard Hot 100	42
US Hot R&B/Hip-Hop Songs (Billboard)	23
US Rhythmic Airplay (Billboard)	8
US Rolling Stone Top 100	11

=== Year-end charts ===
Chart (2020)	Position
US Hot R&B/Hip-Hop Songs (Billboard)	81
US Rhythmic (Billboard)	50

== Certifications ==
Region	Certification	Certified units/sales
Australia (ARIA)	Platinum	70,000^{‡}
Brazil (Pro-Música Brasil)	Gold	20,000^{‡}
Canada (Music Canada)	Platinum	80,000^{‡}
New Zealand (RMNZ)	Platinum	30,000^{‡}
United Kingdom (BPI)	Gold	400,000^{‡}
United States (RIAA)	2× Platinum	2,000,000^{‡}
^{‡} Sales+streaming figures based on certification alone.

== Release history ==
Release history and formats for "Come Thru"
Country	Date	Format	Label	Ref.
United States	January 14, 2020	Urban contemporary radio	LVRN; Interscope	
United States	January 21, 2020	Rhythmic contemporary radio	LVRN; Interscope	
