= Numbers (song) =

2020 single by A Boogie wit da Hoodie featuring Roddy Ricch and Gunna

Single by A Boogie wit da Hoodie featuring Roddy Ricch, Gunna and London on da Track

from the album Artist 2.0
- Released: March 31, 2020
- Genre: Hip hop; trap
- Length: 3:08
- Label: Highbridge; Atlantic
- Songwriters: Artist Dubose; Rodrick Moore, Jr.; Sergio Kitchens; London Holmes; Dylan Cleary-Krell
- Producers: London on da Track; Dez Wright

A Boogie wit da Hoodie singles chronology
"King of My City" (2020)	"Numbers" (2020)	"Bleed" (2020)

Roddy Ricch singles chronology
"Walk Em Down" (2020)	"Numbers" (2020)	"Rockstar" (2020)

Gunna singles chronology
"Turks" (2020)	"Numbers" (2020)	"Quarantine Clean" (2020)

London on da Track singles chronology
"Something Real" (2019)	"Numbers" (2020)	"Drop" (2020)

"Numbers" is a song by American rapper A Boogie wit da Hoodie featuring fellow American rappers Roddy Ricch & Gunna and American producer London on da Track. The song was released on March 31, 2020 as the fourth single from the album Artist 2.0. This also serves as the rappers' second collaboration with one another individually. A Boogie wit da Hoodie and Gunna both appeared on Ricch's debut studio album, Please Excuse Me for Being Antisocial on the singles "Tip Toe" and "Start wit Me" respectively. A Boogie wit da Hoodie and Gunna also appeared alongside Dremo on Davido's song "Big Picture" on his second studio album, A Good Time.

The song became A Boogie's highest charting song, debuting and peaking at number 23 on the Billboard Hot 100. The song also debuted at number five on the Rolling Stone 100.

== Background ==
The song was originally an album track, released alongside the album on February 14, 2020. The song was later sent to US rhythmic contemporary radio on March 31, 2020 as the fifth single of the album.

== Chart performance ==
"Numbers" debuted and peaked at number 23 on the US Billboard Hot 100 chart on the week of February 28, 2020. This became A Boogie wit da Hoodie's highest charting song on the Hot 100. This song is London on da Track's highest charting song as a credited lead artist. In addition, the song debuted at number five on the Rolling Stone 100 earning 18.4 million streams in its first week. It charted with ten other songs from "Artist 2.0", including "Me and My Guitar" and "Might Not Give Up" which debuted at number 18 and 23 respectively. On February 1, 2021, the single was certified platinum by the Recording Industry Association of America (RIAA) for combined sales and streaming equivalent units of over one million units in the United States.

== Charts ==
Chart (2020)	Peak position
Canada Hot 100 (Billboard)	32
New Zealand Hot Singles (RMNZ)	16
UK Singles (Official Charts)	53
US Billboard Hot 100	23
US Hot R&B/Hip-Hop Songs (Billboard)	12
US Rhythmic Airplay (Billboard)	33
US Rolling Stone Top 100	5

== Certifications ==
Region	Certification	Certified units/sales
Canada (Music Canada)	Platinum	80,000^{‡}
United States (RIAA)	Platinum	1,000,000^{‡}
^{‡} Sales+streaming figures based on certification alone.

== Release history ==
Region	Date	Format	Label	Ref.
Various	February 14, 2020	Digital download streaming	Highbridge; Atlantic	
United States	March 31, 2020	Rhythmic and Urban contemporary	Highbridge; Atlantic	
