= A Boogie wit da Hoodie =

American rapper (born 1995)

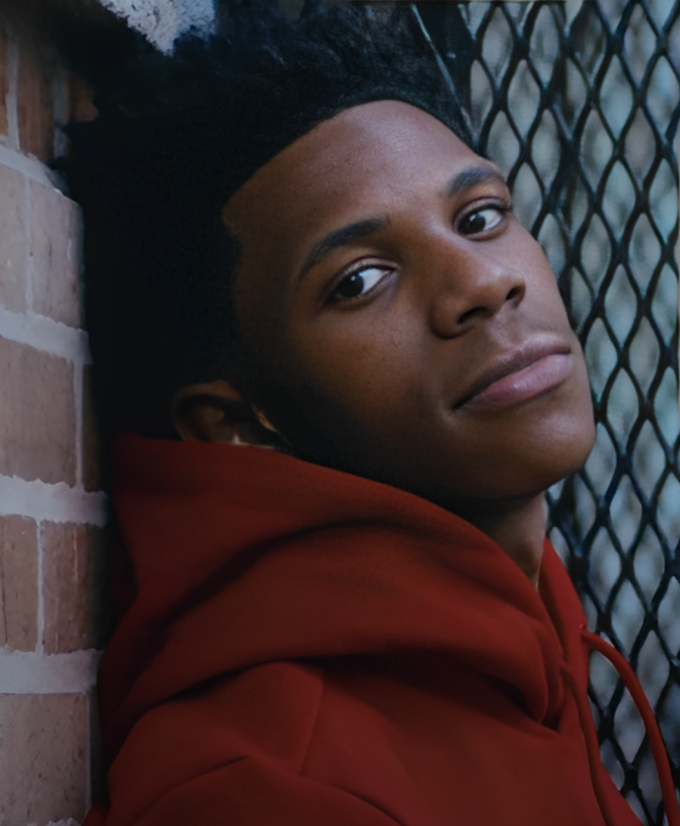
- A Boogie wit da Hoodie in November 2019

Background information
- Also known as: A Boogie
- Born: Artist Julius Dubose; December 6, 1995 (age 30); The Bronx, New York City, U.S.
- Genres: Hip-hop; trap
- Occupations: Rapper; actor
- Works: A Boogie wit da Hoodie discography
- Years active: 2016–present
- Labels: Highbridge the Label; Atlantic
- Website: aboogiehbtl.com

Artist Julius Dubose (born on December 6, 1995), known professionally as A Boogie wit da Hoodie or simply A Boogie, is an American rapper. He signed with Atlantic Records to release his debut studio album, The Bigger Artist (2017). Led by the Billboard Hot 100-top 20 single "Drowning" (featuring Kodak Black), the album was met with critical praise and peaked at number four on the Billboard 200.

His second album, Hoodie SZN (2018), peaked atop the Billboard 200, while his third, Artist 2.0 (2020) peaked at number two; the albums were met with divided critical reception and supported by his second and third top 20 singles, "Look Back at It" and "Numbers" (featuring Roddy Ricch, Gunna and London on da Track), respectively. At the BET Awards 2018, Dubose was nominated for Best New Artist. His fourth album, Me vs. Myself (2022), peaked at number six on the Billboard 200 and received positive reviews. His fifth album, Better Off Alone received continued praise despite commercial failure.

Dubose's stage name is derived from the character "Ace Boogie" from the 2002 film Paid in Full, and because he frequently wore hoodies, friends gave him the nickname "A Boogie wit da Hoodie". Dubose starred in his documentary film The Rise of Artist Dubose, released on Facebook Watch on November 15, 2024.

== Early life and education ==
Artist Julius Dubose was born on December 6, 1995, in the Highbridge neighborhood of the Bronx, New York City. Dubose was raised in Highbridge and began rapping at age twelve after listening to Kanye West and 50 Cent. He attended Dewitt Clinton High School, where he expanded upon rapping during his freshman year, engaging in cyphers at lunchtime by performing rhymes he had already written and stored in a large notebook he carried with him. Remarking on his time in high school to XXL, he said, "I was regular, nobody really noticed me. I was the one in the back of the classroom, quiet."

Growing up, Dubose frequently got into legal trouble, mainly for selling cannabis and narcotics. After finding out what he was doing, Dubose's parents sent him to Florida as punishment. He attended Fort Pierce Central in Fort Pierce, Florida. In Florida, Dubose was kept under house arrest. During this confinement, he began to work on his artistry, starting off by tweaking his self-composed rhymes and gradually one thing leading to another. He built an amateur studio inside the apartment that he lived in. Following his high school graduation, Dubose continued to focus on his music while working jobs in different sectors, including construction and pizza delivery.

== Career ==
=== 2015–2016: Career beginnings ===
Dubose's official discography began with the single "Temporary", which he released on SoundCloud. He was just nineteen at the time of its release. Myster Whyte, who he met in Florida and produced the song, showed A Boogie the inside of his first professional studio. He asked A Boogie to work with a trainer until he got his techniques right. Dubose's said, "I used to record songs like, play the beat from one phone and have another phone recording me and just rap. Moving from that to a studio was like, 'Damn, I never knew I could sound like this'. It was just magic". The training sessions with Myster helped progress his sound.

In 2015, Dubose moved back to New York in an attempt to start making hip hop his full-time career. He, Don Q, Quincy "QP" Acheampong, and Bubba then created Highbridge the Label and set up a home studio. A Boogie released his first full-length project, a mixtape titled Artist, in February 2016, which launched his career and was on Forbes list of up-and-coming rappers. The mixtape was recorded during a time when Dubose was dealing with a difficult break-up which helped influence the mixtape and Dubose's future sound all together.

Dubose then released a collaborative project, alongside fellow Highbridge-based rapper Don Q, titled Highbridge the Label: The Takeover Vol.1, on May 18, 2016. Dubose went on to have three opening dates on Drake and Future's Summer Sixteen Tour. Dubose was also co-signed by Drake. In July 2016, A Boogie signed a deal with Atlantic Records. In September 2016, he was featured on the BET Hip Hop Awards cypher alongside Don Q, Russ, Kent Jones and Nick Grant. Later in October 2016, A Boogie released his first extended play (EP), titled TBA, in acronym for "The Bigger Artist". The EP peaked at number 63 on the US Billboard 200 chart and appeared on Rolling Stone magazine's 40 Best Rap Albums of 2016 list.

=== 2017–2018: The Bigger Artist and Hoodie SZN ===
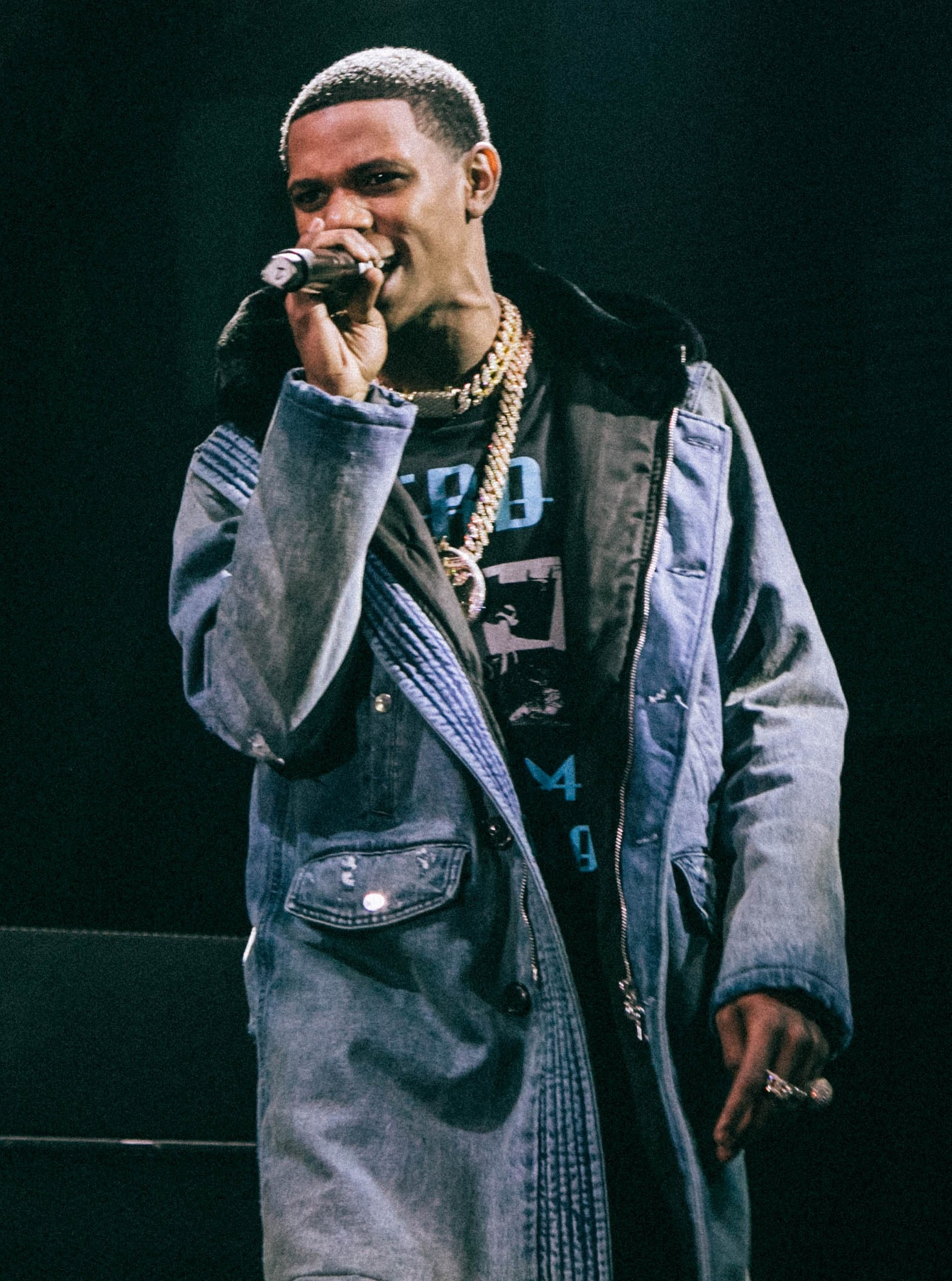
A Boogie wit da Hoodie performing in 2017

On June 13, 2017, Dubose was named as one of the ten of XXL's "2017 Freshman Class". On September 29, 2017, he released his debut studio album, The Bigger Artist, featuring guest appearances from Chris Brown, Trey Songz, Kodak Black, 21 Savage, PnB Rock and YoungBoy Never Broke Again. The album's lead single, "Drowning" featuring Kodak Black, peaked at number 38 on the US Billboard Hot 100 and became one of his highest-charting singles in the country so far.

Dubose was featured on fellow New York rapper 6ix9ine's single, "Keke" on January 14, 2018. The song peaked at number 43 on the Billboard Hot 100. Dubose also appeared on the song "Waka" on 6ix9ine's album Dummy Boy, released in November 2018.

Dubose's second album Hoodie SZN was released on December 21, 2018, with contributions from 6ix9ine, Juice Wrld, Offset and more. It debuted at number 2 on the Billboard 200, selling 90,000 copies in its first week. It reached number one on January 14, 2019. It became one of the most played albums of 2019 and placed number 10 on the Billboard 200 Year-End chart. It also appeared on Billboard's Decade-End chart at number 69.

=== 2019–2020: Artist 2.0 ===
Dubose featured on over 20 songs in 2019, alongside artists such as Ed Sheeran, Rick Ross, Khalid, Ally Brooke, Liam Payne, Lil Durk and Summer Walker. He also toured and performed at concerts throughout 2019 in the US and UK.

On September 13, 2019, Dubose released the first single from his album Artist 2.0 — "Mood Swings", which debuted at 76 on the Billboard Hot 100. On November 15, 2019, Dubose released the second single from Artist 2.0 — "Reply", which features rapper Lil Uzi Vert. It debuted at number 49 on the Billboard Hot 100. (Uzi is also featured on the track "Luv is Art" from the album.) On January 31, 2020, Dubose released the third single from Artist 2.0 called "King of My City". It debuted and peaked at 69 on the Billboard Hot 100.

Artist 2.0 was officially released on February 14, 2020, Valentine's Day. It was his third studio album. Dubose chose to release Artist 2.0 on Valentine's Day due to the first Artist album being released on Valentine's Day in 2016, and also due to the fact it was his daughter's third birthday.

The album received unfavorable reviews but was a commercial success, debuting at number two on the Billboard 200 chart, earning 111,000 album-equivalent units (including 3,000 copies in pure album sales) in its first week. Artist 2.0 features contributions by Roddy Ricch, Gunna, DaBaby, Khalid, Summer Walker, Lil Uzi Vert, and more.

Dubose was due to perform at Wireless 2020, alongside other rappers such as AJ Tracey and A$AP Rocky, but the event was cancelled due to the COVID-19 pandemic.

On June 16, 2020, Dubose released "Bleed", the lead single of the deluxe version of Artist 2.0, which was released on June 19, 2020. It peaked at number 57 on the Billboard Hot 100.

=== 2021–2022: Hiatus and Me vs. Myself ===
After the deluxe edition of Artist 2.0, Dubose did not issue any singles for around a year, taking a hiatus. During this period, however, he was featured on songs with artists such as Pop Smoke, Jess Glynne, Nas, Capo Plaza, DJ Khaled, and more.

On May 14, 2021, Dubose returned alongside American rapper Rowdy Rebel and released their song "9 Bridge".

On May 21, 2021, Dubose released a single featuring Lil Durk, titled "24 Hours". It debuted at number 92 on the Billboard Hot 100. As of July 2023 is certified platinum.

In July 2021, while Dubose was working on his fourth studio album, around 20 songs for the album were leaked, which delayed the album until late 2022. Dubose stated, "The more songs get leaked, the longer I take to drop, I'm not putting leaked songs on my album and I work hard AF to write all these songs myself! So if you out here leaking sh*t stop eatin up and let me cook".

On December 7, 2021, a day after his 26th birthday, Dubose announced the upcoming release of a new EP as a prequel to his fourth studio album, at that point titled A Boogie vs. Artist,. The EP was titled B4 A Boogie vs. Artist (or simply B4 AVA) and was scheduled for a December 10, 2021, release date. The announcement was accompanied by a snippet of the song "Be Free". The track list of the EP was revealed three days later. "24 Hours," his earlier collaboration with Lil Durk, was included on the EP. One of the songs on the EP, "Man in the Mirror," was released as a single on February 11, 2022. It peaked at 82 on the Billboard Hot 100.

In 2022, Dubose was cast to voice Francis "KG" Leibowitz-Jenkins in the rebooted Disney+ animated series, The Proud Family: Louder and Prouder.

On February 11, 2022, and March 4, 2022, Dubose returned with warmup singles before the release of A Boogie vs. Artist — now called Me vs. Myself.The singles were titled "Non Judgemental" and "Hit Different", featuring New York drill rapper B-Lovee. On the same date Dubose appeared and was featured on King Von's What It Means to Be King album specifically on song "My Fault".

Dubose released a single on April 1, 2022, called "Playa", featuring American singer H.E.R., and with Dubose's girlfriend Ella Rodriguez.

On September 5, 2022, Dubose finally announced the date for his fourth studio album, Me vs. Myself, set for release on November 4, 2022.

One single from the album released on October 7, 2022, called "B.R.O (Better Ride Out)", featuring American rapper Roddy Ricch. Just two weeks later, on October 21, 2022, Dubose released "Take Shots" featuring Canadian rapper Tory Lanez. On October 27, he revealed the album's tracklist, which listed the song titles and blurred out the names of the featured artists for their unreleased songs with him, along with listing which side each song is on: "Artist" or "A Boogie".

Following the pushing back of Drake and 21 Savage's collaborative album, Her Loss, from October 28, 2022, to November 4, 2022, Dubose announced that he was delaying his own album so as to not share a release date with the duo — Me vs. Myself was pushed back until December 9, 2022.

The album's final single, "Ballin", was exclusively released on NBA 2K23 on November 1, 2022; it was later added to all digital platforms on November 4, 2022.

Me vs. Myself was released on December 9, 2022, with features from Lil Durk, Kodak Black, H.E.R & more. It peaked at 6 on the Billboard Hot 200. The deluxe of Me vs Myself was released 3 days later with one bonus song called "Needed That" featuring PnB Rock.

=== 2023–2024: Me vs Myself Tour & Better Off Alone ===
Dubose announced his Me vs Myself Tour at the end of 2022, which started in February 2023. It sold out within minutes. He performed in North America and Europe, in venues such as Barclays Center, Coca-Cola Coliseum and Alexandra Palace. He also went back on tour in June on a Canadian tour due to high demand and performed at big festivals this year such as Coachella, Lollapalooza and more.

Dubose would go on to announce that he would release multiple albums in 2023, including a collaborative album also.

On February 14, 2023, Dubose issued his annual Valentine's single called "No 808's" featuring American rapper Vory.

A week later, Dubose would go on to issue a remix to his song "Secrets", which released in 2020. This was featuring Mariah the Scientist. This was due to the song gaining traction on the video-sharing platform TikTok.

On April 21, Dubose released "Chills (LA Hills)", a collaboration with Dutch DJ Tiësto for his album Drive. The song peaked at 11 on the Billboard US Dance/Electronic Chart.

On May 31, Dubose was featured on the soundtrack of the Spider-Man: Across the Spider-Verse movie. He was featured on lead single of the film Calling with Swae Lee, Nav and was produced by Metro Boomin. It peaked at 41 on the Billboard Hot 100, and charted in multiple countries such as Australia, Canada, France, India, UK & more. It is currently one of the most streamed rap songs of 2023. They also performed the song at the 2023 MTV Video Music Awards making his VMA debut performance.

On June 21, Dubose would announce at one of his shows in Canada, that his fifth studio album was titled Better Off Alone. The album was initially set for release in 2023, however, it was later confirmed for mid-2024.

On August 14, 2023, at the Hip-Hop 50 Live at Yankee Stadium Concert, Dubose would announce the upcoming release of a new EP as a prequel to his fifth studio album, Better Off Alone. The EP is titled B4 BOA (Before Better Off Alone), and released September 8, 2023. The three-track EP includes "Her Birthday", "Booby Trap" and "Did Me Wrong".

Dubose released a single from Better Off Alone called "Steppas" on March 29, 2024.

On April 22, 2024, Dubose released an EP titled Alone; the four-track EP includes "Tiffanys", "No More Questions", "How to Love" and "D.T.N."

Better Off Alone was released on May 17, 2024. It included features from frequent collaborators such as Young Thug and Lil Durk, alongside new appearances from Cash Cobain, Future, Fridayy and Mariah the Scientist. The album received generally positive feedback from critics. HotNewHipHop described the project as a "reflective look at the dualities of fame and the cost of artistic expression", noting Dubose's more mature and contemplative approach. Ratings Game Music highlighted "Spotlight", featuring Lil Durk, as one of the standout tracks, praising the duo's chemistry and the song's feel–good production. Rap Radar emphasized the album's introspective direction, with Dubose delivering a more personal narrative across its 21 tracks.

Commercially, the album debuted at number 18 on the Billboard 200, selling 26,000 units in its first week, becoming Dubose's least commercially successful album to date. It remained on the chart for three weeks. Despite the modest commercial performance, the album was supported by the Better Off Alone global tour and was sold out, which took place throughout 2024. The tour covered Europe, the United Kingdom and North America, and featured support from NLE Choppa, Luh Tyler and Byron Messia.

=== 2025–present: Upcoming sixth album ===
Throughout early 2025, Dubose remained relatively quiet, releasing no new music and making few public appearances. He returned to the spotlight after appearing on streamer Kai Cenat’s Mafiathon 3 Subathon, where he previewed a new single titled "Part of Me". The track interpolated Mariah Carey's "We Belong Together" and quickly gained traction on TikTok following the stream. On October 10, 2025, Dubose officially released "Part of Me" as a single. It debuted and peaked at number 66 on the Billboard Hot 100.

A music video for "Part of Me", directed by Kid Art, was released on December 1, 2025, through Dubose's YouTube channel. At the end of the video, he previewed another upcoming song, "Last Drink", which was slated for release soon. Last Drink was surprised released on December 5, 2025, with an accompanied music video dropping the same day also directed by Kid Art.

Dubose announced through a series of Instagram posts and later through his 2025 Spotify Wrapped fan message that new music was on the way. He confirmed that a new studio album was in development, along with multiple projects planned for the remainder of the year and the following year.

== Personal life ==
=== Legal issues ===
In 2017, Lil B accused Dubose and PnB Rock of jumping him at the California Rolling Loud festival. Many members of the hip hop community, such as Big Sean and SpaceGhostPurrp, criticized Dubose for his role in the incident. However all things were settled and Lil B and Dubose squashed their beef two days later, through a meeting initiated by Kilo Kurt of Thizz Entertainment.

In January 2021, Dubose was sued by a Bergen County, New Jersey, couple, who claimed that he clogged the toilets and caused $260,000 in damages in their mansion, which they had leased to him in 2017 and 2018.

Dubose was arrested a day after celebrating his 25th birthday in December 2020. A representative for the Bergen County Prosecutor's Office confirmed that A Boogie was arrested on December 7, 2020, on charges of unlawful possession of a handgun (2nd-degree felony) and possession of marijuana. Dubose was taken into custody following an investigation conducted by detectives from the Bergen County Prosecutor's Office (BCPO), who obtained a warrant to search A Boogie's Demarest, New Jersey, home. BCPO detectives were accompanied by detectives from the New York City Police Department and officers from the Demarest Police Department. While doing a search of Dubose's home, law enforcement seized four guns: "a Ruger .380 handgun, a Glock .40 caliber handgun, an H&K 9mm handgun and a Smith & Wesson 9mm handgun." They also discovered "hollow point bullets, various high capacity magazines" as well as "marijuana, hashish oil edibles and drug paraphernalia commonly associated with the distribution of controlled dangerous substances." Dubose's security guard, 33-year-old Quashaun Hagler, was also arrested. Hagler, who is a Georgia resident, appears to have been at A Boogie's home at the time of the search and arrest. Hagler was charged with three counts of unlawful possession of a handgun (a 2nd-degree felony) and one count of possession of a large capacity magazine (a 4th-degree felony).

Dubose was arrested at London's Wireless Festival in September 2021 by the Metropolitan Police, by request of the Greater Manchester Police. He was shortly released with the charges not made public.

Dubose is known for giving back to the community he came from and the city recognized this. In December 2023, the street Nelson Avenue and W. 166th Street in the Bronx was named “Artist (A Boogie) Dubose Drive” after him. He also received a citation from the NYC mayor.

=== Family ===
Dubose has two children with girlfriend and social media influencer, Ella Rodriguez. She was featured on the first version of his single "Playa". Their daughter Melody Valentine Dubose was born on Valentine's Day, February 14, 2017, and their son Artist Dubose, Jr. was born on June 27, 2020.

== Highbridge the Label ==
Highbridge the Label
- Parent company: Warner Music Group
- Founded: 2016
- Founder: Quincy "QP" Acheampong Sambou "Bubba" Camara
- Status: Active
- Distributor: Atlantic Records EMPIRE
- Country of origin: United States
- Location: New York City
- Official website: highbridgethelabel.com

Highbridge the Label is an American record label founded by Quincy "QP" Acheampong and Sambou "Bubba" Camara in 2016. Highbridge the Label partnered with Atlantic Records to sign a deal to have full control of the artists. In 2021 Highbridge the Label also partnered with EMPIRE to sign Don Q & Lil Rekk. In 2022, a subsidiary label of Highbridge the Label was created called H.E.A.V.Y. Current members of the label include Bouba Savage & Wowdy HBTL.

=== Roster ===
Artist	Year joined
A Boogie wit da Hoodie	2016
Don Q (with Empire)	2016 (2021 with Empire)
Enisa	2019
Lil Rekk (with Empire)	2020
Bouba Savage (with H.E.A.V.Y)	2021
Wowdy HBTL (with H.E.A.V.Y)	2022

== Tours ==
=== Headlining ===
- TBA Tour (2017)
- The Bigger Artist Tour (2017)
- Monster Energy Outbreak Tour Presents: A Boogie vs Artist Tour (2019)
- AVA College Tour (2021)
- Me vs Myself Tour (2023)
- Me vs Myself College Tour (2023)
- Better Off Alone Tour (2024)

=== Supporting ===
- Summer Sixteen Tour (2016)

== Discography ==
Studio albums

- Artist (2016)
- The Bigger Artist (2017)
- Hoodie SZN (2018)
- Artist 2.0 (2020)
- Me vs. Myself (2022)
- Better Off Alone (2024)
- Artistry (2026)

== Filmography ==
=== Film ===
Year	Title	Role	Notes
2018	The After Party	Himself	Cameo
2024	The Rise of Artist Dubose	Himself	Documentary film

=== Television ===
Year	Title	Role	Notes
2017–18	Hype Up	Himself	2 Episodes
2018	Droppin' Cash Los Angeles	Himself	Season 1, Episode 17
2018	Wild 'n Out	Himself	Season 10, Episode 15
2019	Late Night with Seth Meyers	Himself	Season 6, Episode 58 (Musical Guest)
2020	The Tonight Show Starring Jimmy Fallon	Himself	Season 7, Episode 106 (Musical Guest)
2022–present	The Proud Family: Louder and Prouder	Francis "KG" Leibowitz-Jenkins (voice)	Supporting role, credited as Artist "A Boogie" Dubose

== Awards and nominations ==
=== BET Awards ===
Year	Nominee / work	Award	Result
2018	A Boogie wit da Hoodie	Best New Artist	Nominated

=== ASCAP ===
Year	Nominee / work	Award	Result
2020	"Look Back at It"	Nominated for Rhythm & Soul Music	Nominated
2020	"Look Back at It"	Nominated for Pop Music	Nominated

== See also ==
- List of highest-certified music artists in the United States
