= Summer Walker =

American singer (born 1996)

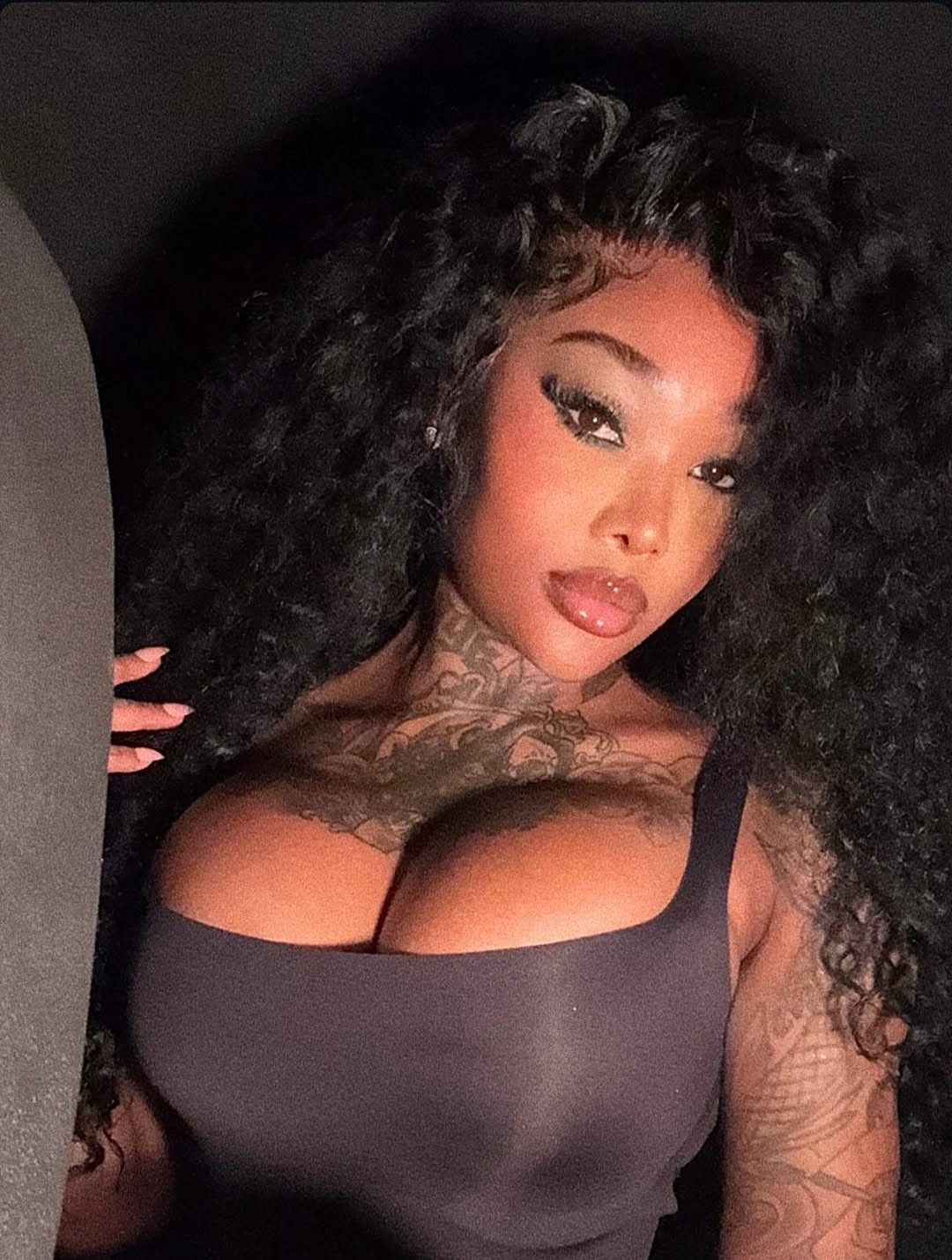
- Summer Walker in 2025

Background information
- Born: Summer Marjani Walker; April 11, 1996 (age 30); Atlanta, Georgia, U.S.
- Genres: R&B
- Occupations: Singer; songwriter
- Instruments: Vocals; guitar
- Works: Discography
- Years active: 2017–present
- Labels: Love Renaissance; Interscope; Ghetto Earth
- Children: 3
- Website: summerwalkermusic.com

Summer Marjani Walker (born April 11, 1996) is an American singer and songwriter. She signed with the Atlanta-based record label Love Renaissance, an imprint of Interscope Records, in late 2017 to release her debut commercial mixtape, Last Day of Summer (2018). Its lead single, "Girls Need Love", spawned a remix featuring Canadian rapper Drake, which became her first entry on the Billboard Hot 100. Her debut studio album, Over It (2019), was met with critical praise, peaked at number two on the Billboard 200 chart—briefly breaking the record for the biggest debut streaming week for a female R&B artist—and received triple platinum certification by the Recording Industry Association of America (RIAA).

Her second studio album, Still Over It (2021), debuted atop the Billboard 200. The album broke the record for most streams in a single day by a female artist on Apple Music and broke her previous record for largest streaming debut-week for a female R&B artist; she also matched Taylor Swift as the only female musical act to have 18 concurrent songs from one album enter the Billboard Hot 100. It spawned the single "Ex for a Reason" (with JT of City Girls), which peaked within the top 40 of the Billboard Hot 100, while its follow-up, "No Love" (with SZA and Cardi B), peaked within the top 15 and received platinum certification by the RIAA. Her 2023 single, "Good Good" (with Usher and 21 Savage), also entered the chart's top 40.

Her accolades include a Billboard Music Award, a IHeartRadio Music Awards, three Soul Train Music Awards, and four Grammy Award nominations. In 2022 Billboard Women in Music recognized Walker with the Chart Breaker Award for her achievement on Billboard charts. As of 2026, Walker has sold over 53.5 million certified units from the RIAA between albums and songs.

== Early life ==
Walker was born and raised in Atlanta. From 2016 to 2018, she had a small cleaning business. She taught herself how to play the guitar by watching tutorials on YouTube. Soon after, she began performing covers and posting various videos of herself to both YouTube and Vine.

== Career ==
=== 2018–2019: Career beginnings and Last Day of Summer ===
Walker was discovered on Vine by a woman of the same name, who works as the studio manager of an Atlanta-based label called Love Renaissance. In 2017, she signed with this label and Interscope Records. On October 19, 2018, Walker released her debut commercial mixtape, titled Last Day of Summer, supported by the lead single, "Girls Need Love". Walker's album contained her thoughts on love, doubt, and womanhood.

Towards the end of 2018, Walker toured with 6lack on the From East Atlanta With Love Tour. Following the success of her mixtape, Apple Music named Walker as its newest Up Next artist in 2019, and she became the number 8 R&B artist worldwide across the platform. On January 25, 2019, Walker released her first EP titled Clear, consisting of four tracks of acoustic recordings. On February 27, she released the remix to her song, "Girls Need Love", with Drake.

=== 2019–2020: Breakthrough and Over It ===
On August 23, 2019, Walker released "Playing Games" as the first single for her debut album, titled Over It. The song, which contains an interpolation of Destiny's Child's number-one hit "Say My Name", was produced by London on da Track. Over It debuted at number two on the US Billboard 200 with 134,000 units in its first week. Its debut week marked the largest streaming week for an R&B album by a female artist, in terms of on-demand audio streams. The album topped the R&B Albums chart for 14 nonconsecutive weeks. Walker supported Over It with her accompanying The First and Last Tour, which kicked off on October 20. Walker canceled 20 out of 29 dates, citing social anxiety. On November 17, Walker won her first Soul Train Music Award for Best New Artist, but later received backlash from fans for her short speech and was accused of faking her social anxiety.

On June 29, Walker announced the release of an EP, titled Life on Earth to be released on July 10. The announcement came a day after she performed "Session 32" and "Come Thru" with Usher at the 2020 BET Awards, where Walker was nominated for Best New Artist and Best Female R&B/Pop Artist. Life on Earth debuted atop the Billboard's Top R&B Albums chart, becoming Walker's second number one. It also debuted at number 8 on the Billboard 200 becoming Walker's second top 10 project on the chart.

Two tracks from the EP charted on the Billboard Hot 100: "Let It Go", and "My Affection" featuring PartyNextDoor, at numbers 84 and 86, respectively. "Come Thru" featuring Usher was certified platinum on August 20 by the Recording Industry Association of America (RIAA). A few days later, on August 25, her song "Body" was certified gold, "Playing Games" was certified two-time platinum, and "Girls Need Love" was certified three-time platinum by the Recording Industry Association of America (RIAA), respectively. On October 14, Walker won the Billboard Music Award for the Best Female R&B Artist at the 2020 ceremony, beating out Beyoncé and Lizzo. Walker was also nominated for Top R&B Artist and Top R&B Album for Over It.

On November 23, she released a repackaged version of the Over It album, titled Over It (Complete Edition). The repackaged version of the album features all 18 songs from the standard version of the album plus additional instrumentals, a capella versions, live renditions and more. On December 10, Walker's debut song, "Session 32" was certified gold and her collaboration featuring Jhené Aiko, titled "I'll Kill You" was certified platinum by the Recording Industry Association of America (RIAA), respectively. On the Billboard 200 year-end chart of 2020, Over It was the second best performing R&B album of the year behind The Weeknd's After Hours and was the seventeenth best performing album overall.

=== 2021–present: Still Over It and Finally Over It ===
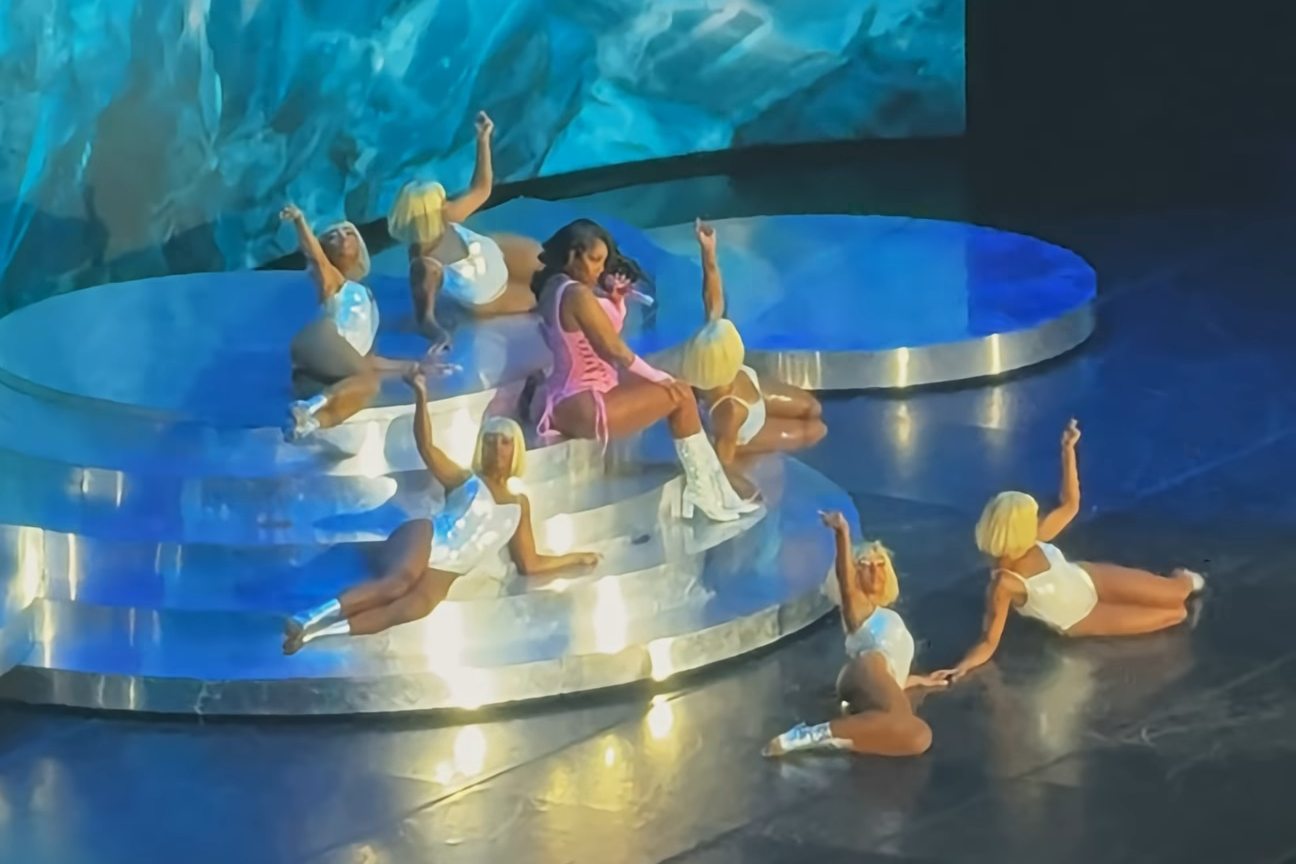
Walker performing live in 2025

On November 5, 2021, Walker released her second album Still Over It which has since broken the record for biggest R&B debut on the US albums chart since Beyoncé's album Lemonade. The album surpassed 166,000 units within the first week of release. On November 29, Walker and Ari Lennox performed the song "Unloyal" together at the 2021 Soul Train Music Awards.

The "No Love" extended remix featuring Cardi B was announced on March 21, 2022. On March 25, it was released along with a music video. In May, Walker was featured on Kendrick Lamar's track "Purple Hearts" from the 2022 album Mr. Morale & the Big Steppers, for which Walker earned her first Grammy Award nomination.

On September 28, 2022, Ciara released the single "Better Thangs", featuring Walker. The official music video, directed by Mia Barnes, premiered online on September 30.

In 2023, Walker was featured on several songs including "Good Good" by Usher, "So Be It" by Alex Vaughn, "Hell n Back" by Bakar, "I Might" by Sexyy Red, and "Prove It" by 21 Savage. She also released her Clear 2: Soft Life EP, which served as a sequel to her 2019 EP, Clear, and rereleased her debut commercial mixtape, Last Day Of Summer (Sped Up), along with four new versions of her song Girls Need Love, titled Girls Need Love (Girls Mix). These updated versions, which included a solo acoustic performance from Walker, also featured artists like Victoria Monet, Tyla, and Tink.

On November 14, 2025, Walker released her third album, Finally Over It.

== Personal life ==
Walker has well over 24 tattoos as of 2019, including face tattoos.

In November 2020, Walker announced that she was expecting her first child, with current boyfriend London on da Track. Her daughter was born on March 22, 2021. Months later, the pair ended their relationship. On June 25, 2022, she announced on Instagram Live that she was expecting her second child with current boyfriend rapper Larry A.K.A. Lvrd Pharaoh. She gave birth to twin boys on December 29, 2022. She dated BMF co-star and rapper Demetrius Flenory Jr. from April to July 2023.

In December 2024, she began dating Chicago rapper Rico Recklezz. On May 8, 2025, she announced they broke up.

== Artistry ==
Walker has said that she draws inspiration from Amy Winehouse, Jimi Hendrix, Donell Jones and Erykah Badu. She noted Mary J. Blige as an inspiration for the vulnerability and authenticity she displays in her own music, saying "back when Mary J. Blige and Faith Evans were making R&B, they had real pain and real stories. That's why it was so good." Walker has also cited Lauryn Hill and D'Angelo as inspirations for her to experiment and explore new sounds within the R&B and neo soul genres.

== Discography ==
- Over It (2019)
- Still Over It (2021)
- Finally Over It (2025)

== Tours ==
Headlining

- The First and Last Tour (2019)
- The Summer Walker Series (2022)
- The Still Finally Over It Tour (2026)

Supporting

- Breezy Bowl XX (with Chris Brown) (2025)

== Awards and nominations ==
Award	Year (Note: The listed year refers to the date of the ceremony, not necessarily the year in which the corresponding season or episode aired.)	Nominee(s)	Category	Result	Ref.
American Music Awards	2020	Herself	Favorite Soul/R&B Female Artist	Nominated	
American Music Awards	2020	"Playing Games"	Favorite Soul/R&B Song	Nominated	
American Music Awards	2020	Over It	Favorite Soul/R&B Album	Nominated	
American Music Awards	2022	Herself	Favorite Soul/R&B Female Artist	Nominated	
American Music Awards	2022	Still Over It	Favorite R&B Album	Nominated	
BET Awards	2020	Herself	Best New Artist	Nominated	
BET Awards	2020	Herself	Best Female R&B/Pop Artist	Nominated	
BET Awards	2021	Herself	Best Female R&B/Pop Artist	Nominated	
BET Awards	2022	Herself	Best Female R&B/Pop Artist	Nominated	
BET Awards	2022	"Unloyal"	BET Her Award	Nominated	
Billboard Music Awards	2020	Herself	Top R&B Artist	Nominated	
Billboard Music Awards	2020	Herself	Top R&B Female Artist	Won	
Billboard Music Awards	2020	Over It	Top R&B Album	Nominated	
Billboard Music Awards	2022	Herself	Top R&B Artist	Nominated	
Billboard Music Awards	2022	Herself	Top R&B Female Artist	Nominated	
Billboard Music Awards	2022	Still Over It	Top R&B Album	Nominated	
Billboard Women in Music	2022	Herself	Chart Breaker Award	Won	
Grammy Awards	2023	Mr. Morale & the Big Steppers	Album of the Year (as featured artist and songwriter)	Nominated	
Grammy Awards	2024	Clear 2: Soft Life	Best R&B Album	Nominated	
Grammy Awards	2026	"Heart of a Woman"	Best R&B Performance	Nominated	
Grammy Awards	2026	"Heart of a Woman"	Best R&B Song	Nominated	
iHeartRadio Music Awards	2020	Herself	Best New R&B Artist	Won	
iHeartRadio Music Awards	2020	Herself	R&B Artist of the Year	Nominated	
iHeartRadio Music Awards	2020	"Girls Need Love" (with Drake)	R&B Song of the Year	Nominated	
iHeartRadio Music Awards	2021	Herself	R&B Artist of the Year	Nominated	
iHeartRadio Music Awards	2021	"Playing Games"	R&B Song of the Year	Nominated	
MOBO Awards	2020	Herself	Best International Act	Nominated	
MOBO Awards	2022	Herself	Best International Act	Nominated	
MTV Video Music Awards	2020	Herself	Push Best New Artist	Longlisted	
MTV Video Music Awards	2020	"Eleven" (with Khalid)	Best R&B	Nominated	
NAACP Image Awards	2023	"No Love" (with Cardi B and SZA)	Outstanding Duo, Group or Collaboration (Traditional)	Nominated	
NAACP Image Awards	2024	Clear 2: Soft Life EP	Outstanding Album	Nominated	
NAACP Image Awards	2024	"Good Good" (with Usher & 21 Savage)	Outstanding Duo, Group or Collaboration (Contemporary)	Nominated	
NAACP Image Awards	2024	"Good Good" (with Usher & 21 Savage)	Outstanding Soul/R&B Song	Nominated	
Soul Train Music Awards	2019	Herself	Best New Artist	Won	
Soul Train Music Awards	2019	Herself	R&B/Soul Female Artist	Nominated	
Soul Train Music Awards	2019	"Girls Need Love (Remix)"	Song of the Year	Nominated	
Soul Train Music Awards	2020	Herself	Best R&B/Soul Female Artist	Nominated	
Soul Train Music Awards	2020	"Come Thru" (with Usher)	Song of the Year	Nominated	
Soul Train Music Awards	2020	"Come Thru" (with Usher)	Best Collaboration	Nominated	
Soul Train Music Awards	2020	"Playing Games"	The Ashford & Simpson Songwriter's Award	Nominated	
Soul Train Music Awards	2020	Over It	Album of the Year	Won	
Soul Train Music Awards	2023	Herself	Best R&B/Soul Female Artist	Nominated	
Soul Train Music Awards	2023	"To Summer, From Cole (Audio Hug)" (with J Cole)	Best Collaboration	Nominated	
Soul Train Music Awards	2023	"Good Good" (with Usher & 21 Savage)	Best Collaboration	Won	
Soul Train Music Awards	2023	"Good Good" (with Usher & 21 Savage)	Song of the Year	Nominated	
Soul Train Music Awards	2023	"Good Good" (with Usher & 21 Savage)	Video of the Year	Nominated	
Soul Train Music Awards	2023	"Good Good" (with Usher & 21 Savage)	The Ashford & Simpson Songwriter's Award	Nominated	
Soul Train Music Awards	2023	"Good Good" (with Usher & 21 Savage)	Best Dance Performance	Nominated	
Soul Train Music Awards	2023	"Better Thangs" (with Ciara)	Best Dance Performance	Nominated	
Soul Train Music Awards	2023	Clear 2: Soft Life EP	Album of the Year	Nominated	
