= London on da Track =

American record producer (born 1991)

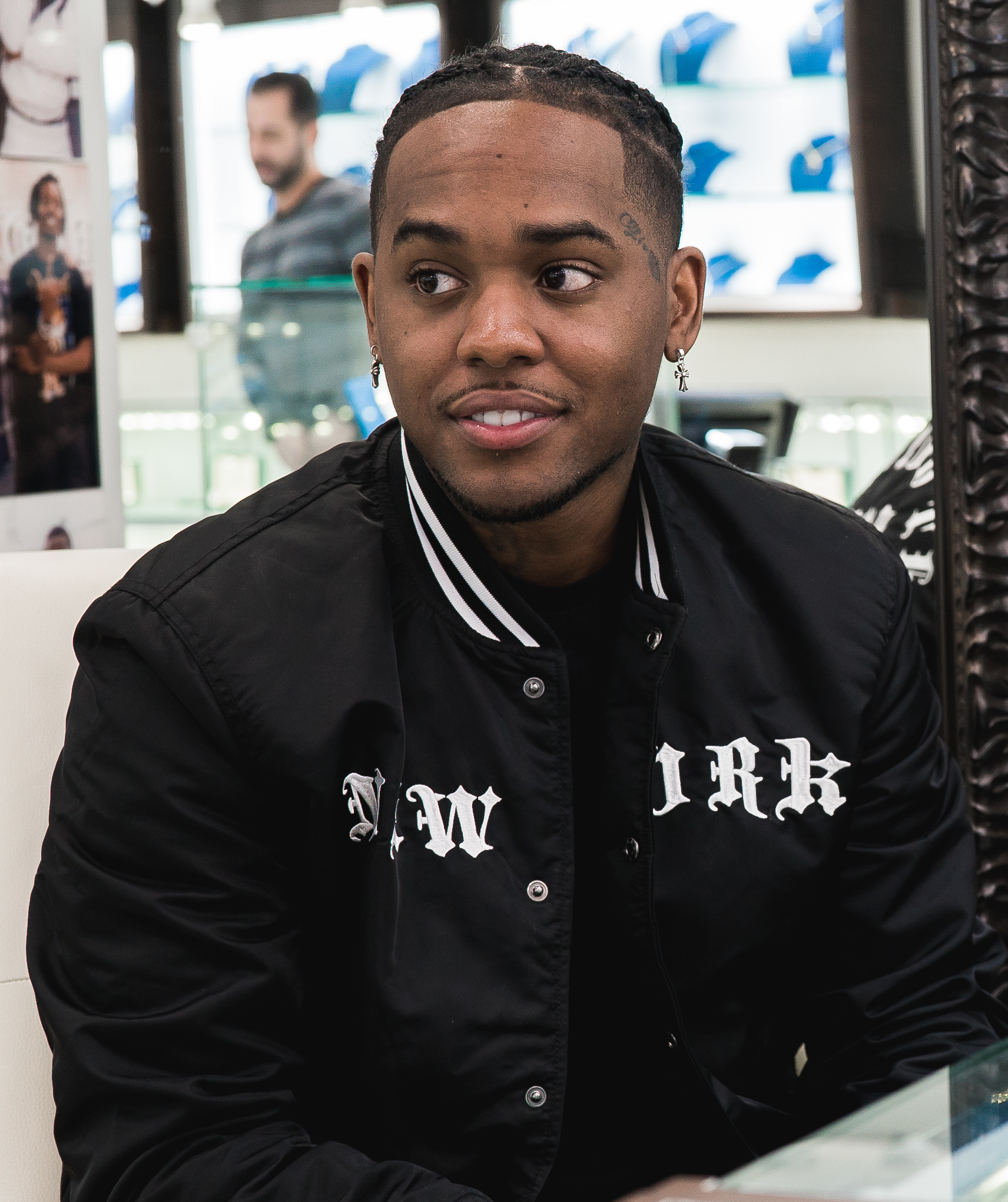
- London on da Track in 2017

Background information
- Also known as: RK London
- Born: London Tyler Holmes; March 27, 1991 (age 35); Memphis, Tennessee, U.S.
- Origin: Atlanta, Georgia, U.S.
- Genres: Hip-hop
- Occupations: Record producer; rapper; songwriter
- Years active: 2010–present
- Labels: RCA; Cash Money
- Member of: Rich Kidz
- Children: 4
- Website: wegotlondonondatrack.com

London Tyler Holmes (born March 27, 1991), known professionally as London on da Track, is an American record producer and rapper. He is a frequent collaborator of fellow Atlanta rapper Young Thug, and has also produced songs for Kodak Black, Nicki Minaj, Tyga, Lil Wayne, A Boogie Wit da Hoodie, Rich Homie Quan, Gucci Mane, Birdman, Saweetie, Sfera Ebbasta, Post Malone, T.I., G-Eazy, 50 Cent, Summer Walker, Roddy Ricch and Ariana Grande, among others.

== Early life ==
Holmes was born in Memphis, but moved to Atlanta, where he spent the majority of his childhood. He learned to play piano and keyboards during church. After high school, Holmes briefly attended Full Sail University in Florida, although he never graduated.

== Career ==
Holmes began rapping at the age of sixteen with the group Dem Savages. The group used to download beats on SoundClick for 99 cents, although most of the beats cost $100 for exclusive rights. As a way to save money, London drew upon his experience playing piano arrangements in church and began making beats for rappers. With the help of online software he was able to refine his craft. He gained local acclaim when he began producing beats for the Rich Kidz. Early on in his career, Holmes gave away his beats for free as a means to build connections and garner more publicity. The first song he produced that received radio play was "Pieon" by Rich Kidz. The success of the song motivated Holmes to continue his work. In 2011, he recorded his first of many collaborations with Young Thug, with the song "Curtains". By proximity of Young Thug, a member of Cash Money Records's spin off project Rich Gang, Holmes was led to sign with the label as an in-house producer by 2014. In April of that year, he was credited on labelmate Tyga's single "Hookah", which marked Holmes' first production to enter the Billboard Hot 100.

In August of that year, rapper and label boss Bryan "Birdman" Williams referred to Holmes as "the best producer in the business, as we speak today". Holmes' frequent collaborator Young Thug has stated that [Holmes] is his favorite producer to work with, and will go down as "the greatest producer ever". Complex included him on their 2013 list of "25 New Producers To Watch For". That same month, three singles produced by London on da Track charted on the Billboard Hot 100 at the same time—Rich Gang's "Lifestyle" at number 16, T.I.'s "About the Money" at 42, and Tyga's aforementioned "Hookah" at 85.

In 2018, he appeared in Black Ink Crew: Chicago. That same year, he was named to Spotify's Secret Genius Ambassador's list. In 2019, he appeared in Netflix's Rhythm + Flow, as a production advisor in the series' home stretch.

In March 2020, Holmes produced and co-wrote Ariana Grande's single "Positions", which debuted atop the Billboard Hot 100, as well as the Billboard Global 200 and Billboard Global Excl. U.S. chart, becoming his most commercially successful production.

== Personal life ==
Holmes has 4 children; a daughter with singer Summer Walker born in 2021, as well as another daughter and 2 sons from previous relationships.

== Discography ==
=== Mixtapes ===
- The DefAnition (with Dae Dae) (2016)

=== Singles ===
==== As lead artist ====
List of singles as lead artist, showing year released
| Title | Year | Peak chart positions | | Album |
| Title | Year | US Bub. | UK | Album |
|---|---|---|---|---|
| "No Flag" (featuring 21 Savage, Offset and Nicki Minaj) | 2017 | — | — | Non-album singles |
| "Whatever You On" (featuring YG, Jeremih, Ty Dolla $ign and Young Thug) | 2017 | — | — | Non-album singles |
| "Up Now" (with Saweetie featuring G-Eazy and Rich the Kid) | 2018 | — | — | Non-album singles |
| "Throw Fits" (with G-Eazy featuring City Girls and Juvenile) | 2019 | — | — | Non-album singles |
| "Something Real" (with Summer Walker and Chris Brown) | 2019 | 20 | 99 | Non-album singles |
| "Stadiums" (with Saint Jhn) | 2022 | — | — | Non-album singles |
| "Most Beautiful Design" (with Coco Jones and Future) | 2024 | — | — | Why Not More? |
"—" denotes a recording that did not chart or was not released in that territory.

==== As featured artist ====
List of singles as featured artist, showing year released
| Title | Year | Peak chart positions | | | Certifications | Album |
| Title | Year | US | US R&B/HH | CAN | Certifications | Album |
|---|---|---|---|---|---|---|
| "Cocky" (ASAP Rocky, Gucci Mane and 21 Savage featuring London on da Track) | 2018 | — | — | 83 | | Uncle Drew |
| "Big Boy Diamonds" (Gucci Mane featuring Kodak Black and London on da Track) | 2019 | 100 | 49 | — | | Woptober II |
| "Fuckyounoah" (Noah Cyrus featuring London on da Track) | 2019 | — | — | — | | Non-album single |
| "Wanna Be" (French Montana featuring PARTYNEXTDOOR and London on da Track) | 2019 | — | — | — | | Montana |
| "Numbers" (A Boogie wit da Hoodie featuring Roddy Ricch, Gunna, and London on da Track) | 2020 | 23 | 12 | 32 | RIAA: Platinum; MC: Platinum | Artist 2.0 |
| "Drop" (DaBaby featuring A Boogie wit da Hoodie and London on da Track) | 2020 | 71 | 32 | — | | Blame It on Baby |
"—" denotes a recording that did not chart or was not released in that territory.

== Production discography ==
=== Charting singles ===
List of singles, with selected chart positions and certifications, showing year released and album name
| Title | Year | Peak chart positions | | | Album |
| Title | Year | US | US R&B/HH | US Rap | Album |
|---|---|---|---|---|---|
| "Hookah" (Tyga featuring Young Thug) | 2014 | 85 | 25 | 19 | Non-album single |
| "About the Money" (T.I. featuring Young Thug) | 2014 | 42 | 12 | 10 | Paperwork |
| "Lifestyle" (Rich Gang featuring Young Thug and Rich Homie Quan) | 2014 | 16 | 4 | 4 | Non-album singles |
| "Take Kare" (Rich Gang featuring Young Thug and Lil Wayne) | 2014 | — | — | — | Non-album singles |
| "Sho Me Love" (Rich Gang featuring Juvenile) | 2014 | — | — | — | Non-album singles |
| "Check" (Young Thug) | 2015 | 100 | 30 | — | Barter 6 |
| "Sneakin'" (Drake featuring 21 Savage) | 2016 | 28 | 8 | 7 | Non-album single |
| "Roll in Peace" (Kodak Black featuring XXXTentacion) | 2017 | 31 | 16 | 14 | Project Baby 2 |
| "You" (Jacquees) | 2018 | 58 | 26 | — | 4275 and Lost at Sea 2 |
| "No Stylist" (French Montana featuring Drake) | 2018 | 47 | 22 | 20 | No Stylist – EP and Montana |
| "Swervin" (A Boogie wit da Hoodie featuring 6ix9ine) | 2018 | 38 | 16 | 13 | Hoodie SZN |
| "Die Young" (Roddy Ricch) | 2018 | 99 | 38 | — | Feed tha Streets II |
| "My Type" (Saweetie) | 2019 | 21 | 10 | 8 | Icy |
| "Tap" (Nav featuring Meek Mill) | 2019 | 87 | 36 | 24 | Bad Habits |
| "Playing Games" (Summer Walker and Bryson Tiller) | 2019 | 16 | 9 | — | Over It |
| "Come Thru" (Summer Walker and Usher) | 2019 | 42 | 23 | — | Over It |
| "Positions" (Ariana Grande) | 2020 | 1 | — | — | Positions |
"—" denotes a recording that did not chart or was not released in that territory.
