= City Girls discography =

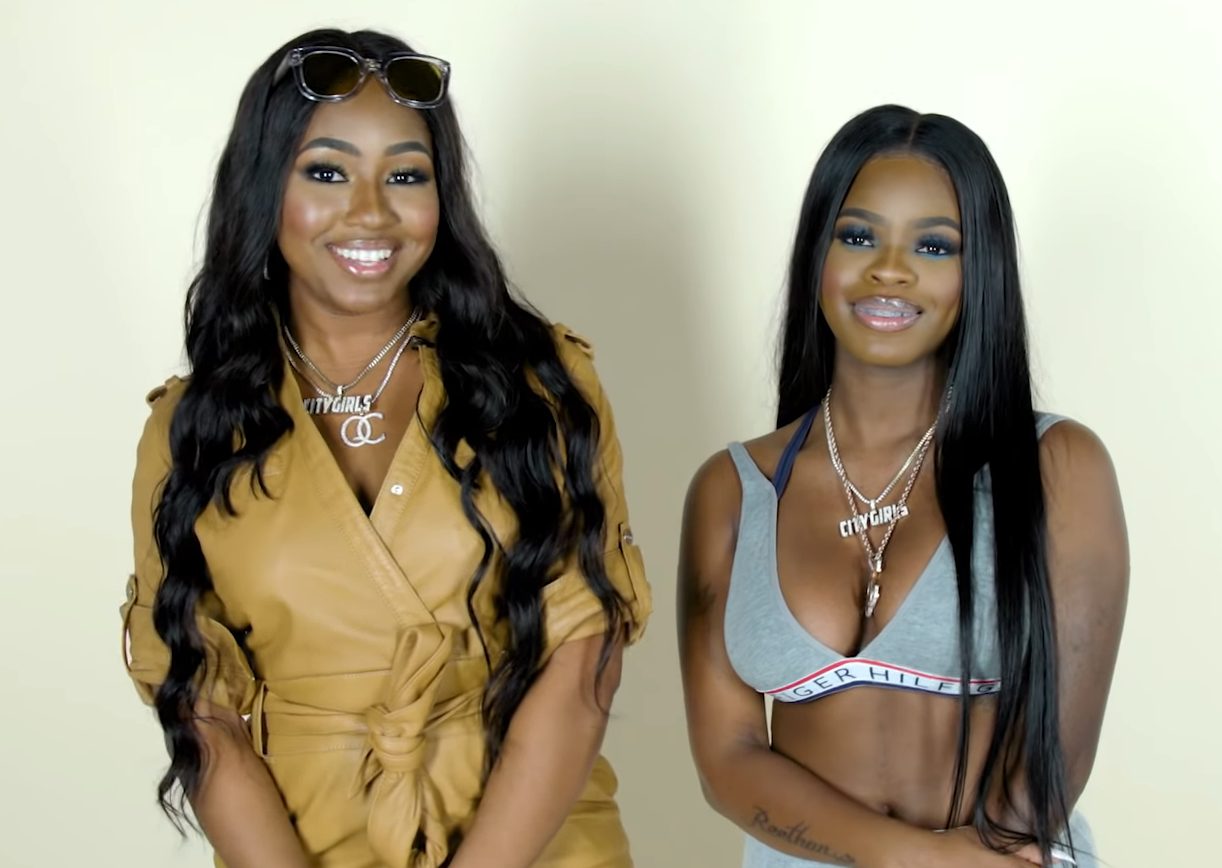
- Studio albums: 3
- Singles: 31
- Mixtapes: 1

American hip-hop duo City Girls have released three studio albums, one mixtape and 31 singles (including 20 as a featured artist).

== Albums ==
=== Studio albums ===
List of studio albums, with selected chart positions and details
Title	Details	Peak chart positions	
Title	Details	US	US R&B /HH
Girl Code	Released: November 16, 2018; Label: Quality Control, Motown, Capitol; Formats: Digital download, streaming, CD, vinyl	55	31
City on Lock	Released: June 20, 2020; Label: Quality Control, Motown; Formats: Digital download, streaming, vinyl	29	17
RAW	Released: October 20, 2023; Label: Quality Control, Motown, Universal; Formats: Digital download, streaming	117	—

=== Mixtapes ===
List of mixtapes, with selected chart positions and details
Title	Details	Peak chart positions
Title	Details	US Heat
Period	Released: May 11, 2018; Label: Quality Control; Format: Digital download, streaming, vinyl	16

== Singles ==
=== As lead artist ===
List of singles as lead artists, with selected chart positions and certifications, showing year released and album name
Title	Year	Peak chart positions				Certifications	Album
Title	Year	US	US R&B /HH	CAN	NZ Hot	Certifications	Album
"Fuck Dat Nigga"	2017	—	—	—	—		Control the Streets, Volume 1
"Where the Bag At"	2018	—	—	—	—		Period
"Twerk" (featuring Cardi B)	2019	29	14	70	31	RIAA: Platinum	Girl Code
"Act Up"	2019	26	11	77	—	RIAA: 3× Platinum; BPI: Silver	Girl Code
"Come On" (with Saweetie featuring DJ Durel)	2019	—	—	—	—		Control the Streets, Volume 2
"JT First Day Out"	2019	—	—	—	—		Non-album single
"Jobs"	2020	— (Note: "Jobs" did not enter the Billboard Hot 100, but peaked at number three on the Bubbling Under Hot 100 chart.)	49	—	—	RIAA: Gold	City on Lock
"Pussy Talk" (featuring Doja Cat or remix with Quavo, Jack Harlow and Lil Wayne)	2020	— (Note: "Pussy Talk" did not enter the Billboard Hot 100, but peaked at number 10 on the Bubbling Under Hot 100 chart.)	44	—	—	RIAA: Platinum	City on Lock
"Throat Baby (Go Baby) [Remix]" (with BRS Kash and DaBaby)	2021	—	—	—	29		Kash Only
"Twerkulator"	2021	51	19	—	34	RIAA: Gold	Non-album single
"Scared"	2021	—	—	—	—		Bruised (Soundtrack from and Inspired by the Netflix film)
"Shisha" (with Saucy Santana)	2021	—	—	—	—		Keep It Playa
"Top Notch" (with Fivio Foreign)	2022	— (Note: "Top Notch" did not enter the Billboard Hot 100, but peaked at number 21 on the Bubbling Under Hot 100 chart.)	—	—	—		Non-album single
"Good Love" (featuring Usher)	2022	70	16	—	—		RAW
"Act Bad" (with Diddy and Fabolous)	2023	—	—	—	—		Non-album single
"I Need a Thug"	2023	—	—	—	—		RAW
"Piñata"	2023	—	—	—	—		RAW
"No Bars" (Note: Originally performed by duo member JT, City Girls they're also accredited as main performers on the original release of the song.)	2023	— (Note: "No Bars" did not enter the Billboard Hot 100, but peaked at number 25 on the Bubbling Under Hot 100 chart.)	—	—	—		RAW
"Face Down"	2023	—	—	—	—		RAW
"Flashy" (with Kim Petras)	2023	—	—	—	—		RAW
"—" denotes a recording that did not chart or was not released in that territory.

=== As featured artists ===
List of singles as featuring artists, with selected chart positions, showing year released and album name
Title	Year	Peak chart positions			Certifications	Album
Title	Year	US	US R&B /HH	NZ Hot	Certifications	Album
"Real Drip" (Kiddo Marv featuring City Girls and Major Nine)	2018	—	—	—		Non-album single
"4 1 Nite" (Mike Smiff featuring City Girls)	2018	—	—	—		All Gas No Brakes (Vol. 3)
"I Just Wanna" (Trina featuring City Girls and Aire)	2018	—	—	—		Non-album singles
"Caramel" (Lloyd featuring City Girls)	2019	—	—	—		Non-album singles
"Throw Fits" (London on da Track and G-Eazy featuring City Girls and Juvenile)	2019	—	—	—		Non-album single
"Leave Em Alone" (Layton Greene and Lil Baby featuring City Girls and PnB Rock)	2019	60	29	—	RIAA: Platinum; BPI: Silver	Control the Streets, Volume 2
"She A Winner" (Trouble featuring City Girls)	2019	—	—	—		Non-album singles
"Wigs" (ASAP Ferg featuring City Girls and Antha)	2019	—	—	—		Non-album singles
"Three Point Stance" (Juicy J featuring City Girls and Megan Thee Stallion)	2019	—	—	—		Non-album singles
"Perfect" (Cousin Stizz featuring City Girls)	2019	—	—	—		Non-album singles
"Wiggle It" (French Montana featuring City Girls)	2019	—	—	39	RIAA: Gold	Control the Streets, Volume 2 and Montana
"Fuck It Up" (YBN Nahmir featuring City Girls and Tyga)	2019	—	—	—		Non-album single
"Peach" (Pardison Fontaine featuring City Girls)	2019	—	—	—		Under8ed
"My Type (Remix)" (Saweetie featuring City Girls and Jhené Aiko)	2019	—	—	38		My Type (The Remixes)
"Supahood" (K. Michelle featuring Kash Doll and City Girls)	2019	—	—	—		All Monsters Are Human
"Found You" (Lil' Kim featuring O.T. Genasis and City Girls)	2019	—	—	—		9
"Bounce" (Samantha Jade featuring City Girls)	2019	—	—	—		Non-album singles
"Pony" (LunchMoney Lewis featuring City Girls)	2019	—	—	—		Non-album singles
"Melanin" (Ciara featuring Lupita Nyong'o, Ester Dean, City Girls and La La)	2019	—	—	—		Non-album singles
"Do It (Remix)" (Chloe x Halle and Doja Cat featuring City Girls and Mulatto)	2020	—	—	38		Non-album singles
"Said Sum (Remix)" (Moneybagg Yo featuring City Girls and DaBaby)	2020	—	—	—		Code Red
"—" denotes a recording that did not chart or was not released in that territory.

=== Promotional singles ===
Title	Year	Album
"Yung and Bhad" (Bhad Bhabie featuring City Girls)	2018	15
"Soakin Wet" (Marlo and Offset featuring City Girls)	2019	Control the Streets, Volume 2
"Handle It" (with Kali Cass)	2019	Non-album promotional singles
"You Tried It"	2019	Non-album promotional singles

== Other charted songs ==
Title	Year	Peak chart positions		Album
Title	Year	US	US R&B /HH	Album
"Do It on the Tip" (Megan Thee Stallion featuring City Girls)	2020	92	33	Good News
"Bills Paid" (DJ Khaled featuring Latto and City Girls)	2022	— (Note: "Bills Paid" did not enter the Billboard Hot 100, but peaked at number six on the Bubbling Under Hot 100 chart.)	35	God Did

== Guest appearances ==
List of non-single guest appearances, with other performing artists, showing year released and album name
Title	Year	Other artist(s)	Album
"In My Feelings" (Note: Uncredited appearance; later released as a single)	2018	Drake	Scorpion
"A&T" (Note: Uncredited appearance)	2018	21 Savage	I Am > I Was
"Surf"	2019	King Combs, AzChike, Tee Grizzley	Cyncerely, C3
"4 Da Moment"	2019	Moneybagg Yo	43va Heartless
"Pastor"	2019	Quavo, Megan Thee Stallion	Control the Streets, Volume 2
"Like That"	2019	Stefflon Don, Renni Rucci, Mustard	Control the Streets, Volume 2
"Shake Sumn"	2019	YFN Lucci, Yo Gotti	HIStory
"Money Fight"	2020	—N/a	Bad Boys for Life
"In n Out"	2020	Mulatto	Queen of Da Souf
"Do It on the Tip"	2020	Megan Thee Stallion	Good News
"Female Goat"	2020	Lakeyah	Time's Up
"Bills Paid"	2022	DJ Khaled, Latto	God Did
"Dade County Dreaming" (Note: Credited individually on digital releases)	2024	Camila Cabello	C,XOXO
