= Live from the Swamp Tour =

2025 concert tour by Doechii

- Continental tour by Doechii
- Promotional poster for the tour
- Location: North America
- Associated album: Alligator Bites Never Heal
- Start date: October 14, 2025
- End date: November 23, 2025
- Legs: 1
- No. of shows: 16
- Website: livefromtheswamp.com

Doechii concert chronology
- Alligator Bites Never Heal Tour (2024); Live from the Swamp Tour (2025)

The Live from the Swamp Tour was the second concert tour by American rapper, singer and songwriter Doechii. It commenced on October 14, 2025, in Chicago, Illinois, and concluded in Los Angeles, California. The tour spanned 16 shows across North America.

== Announcements ==
On August 4, 2025, Doechii announced that she would embark on the Live from the Swamp Tour with twelve dates across North America. The pre-sale and general sale dates were announced concurrently. Pre-sales started on August 8, while general sales begin on August 11, 2025. On September 8, 2025, she announced four extra shows happening in New York City, Tampa and two Festival appearances in Atlanta and Los Angeles.

== Set list ==
This setlist is taken from the show in Chicago on October 14. It is not intended to represent all shows throughout the tour.

1. "Stanka Pooh"
2. "Bullfrog"
3. "Boiled Peanuts"
4. "Nissan Altima"
5. "America Has a Problem"
6. "ExtraL"
7. "Alter Ego"
8. "Persuasive"
9. "Slide"
10. "Spookie Coochie"
11. "Nosebleeds"
12. "Crazy"
13. "Anxiety"
14. "Stressed"
15. "Death Roll"
16. "Boom Bap"
17. "Gtfo"
18. "Catfish"
19. "Swamp Bitches"
20. "Denial Is A River"
21. "Balloon"
22. "Wait"

Encore

23. "Beverly Hills"
24. "Yucky Blucky Fruitcake"
25. "Pacer"

== Tour dates ==
List of concerts
Date	City	Country	Venue
October 14	Chicago	United States	Byline Bank Aragon Ballroom
October 17	Toronto	Canada	Coca-Cola Coliseum
October 19	Boston	United States	MGM Music Hall at Fenway
October 20	New York City	United States	Theater at Madison Square Garden
October 21	Washington, D.C.	United States	The Anthem
October 23	Charlotte	United States	Bojangles Coliseum
October 25	Tampa	United States	Yuengling Center
October 26 (Note: Part of ONE Musicfest.)	Atlanta	United States	Piedmont Park
October 27	Cumberland (Note: Promoted as Atlanta.)	United States	Coca-Cola Roxy
October 29	Irving (Note: Promoted as Dallas.)	United States	Toyota Music Factory
October 31	Houston	United States	713 Music Hall
November 3	Phoenix	United States	Arizona Financial Theatre
November 5	San Diego	United States	Gallagher Square
November 7	San Francisco	United States	Bill Graham Civic Auditorium
November 10	Seattle	United States	WaMu Theater
November 23 (Note: Part of Camp Flog Gnaw Carnival.)	Los Angeles	United States	Dodger Stadium
