= Pussy Talk (song) =

2020 single by City Girls featuring Doja Cat

Single by City Girls featuring Doja Cat

from the album City on Lock
- Released: July 6, 2020
- Genre: Dirty rap; trap; hyphy
- Length: 3:38
- Label: Quality Control; Motown
- Songwriters: Caresha Brownlee; Jatavia Johnson; Amala Dlamini; Joshua Luellen; Teiron Robinson
- Producer: Southside

City Girls singles chronology
"Jobs" (2020)	"Pussy Talk" (2020)	"Do It (Remix)" (2020)

Doja Cat singles chronology
"In Your Eyes (Remix)" (2020)	"Pussy Talk" (2020)	"To Be Young" (2020)

Music video
- "Pussy Talk" on YouTube

"Pussy Talk" (edited for radio as "Kitty Talk") is a song by American hip hop duo City Girls and the second single from their second studio album City on Lock (2020). It features American rapper and singer Doja Cat and was produced by Southside.

== Composition ==
The song finds City Girls outlining the qualities they look for in a male sexual partner, including wealth. It also uses "stark production to highlight the plethora of puns and playful bars."

== Critical reception ==
Lakin Starling of Pitchfork praised Yung Miami's performance, writing that she "in particular shines" on the song and "sets the energy of the song with a snooty tone as she rants in the chorus, 'Don't nothin' but this cash make this pussy talk / Don't nothin' but a bag make this pussy talk.'"

== Music video ==
An official music video was directed by Daps and released on July 6, 2020. Filmed partly in an office setting, it starts with Doja Cat rifling through a filing cabinet with folders of different types of men for sex partners, such as princes, athletes, rappers and CEOs, while City Girls prop their red-bottomed Christian Louboutin heels on the desk and type on keyboards with acrylic nails. Wearing business attire along with lingerie bodysuits, City Girls and Doja Cat roam various parts of the office, flaunt their appearances and dance. At one point, the three put up umbrellas as cash rains from the ceiling. Elsewhere, while dressed up and wearing jewelry, they sit for an elegant and lavish meal in a mansion. Through the video, the artists also appear dressed in golden cat costumes in a jungle setting, where they are seen digging their fingers into flowers, papaya and grapefruit as well.

== Remix ==
An official remix of the song was released on November 13, 2020. It features verses from American rappers Quavo, Lil Wayne and Jack Harlow.

== Charts ==
Chart (2020)	Peak position
US Bubbling Under Hot 100 (Billboard)	10
US Hot R&B/Hip-Hop Songs (Billboard)	44

== Certifications ==
Region	Certification	Certified units/sales
United States (RIAA)	Platinum	1,000,000^{‡}
^{‡} Sales+streaming figures based on certification alone.
