= Still Over It =

- Digital cover

Studio album by Summer Walker
- Released: November 5, 2021
- Recorded: August 4, 2019 – October 7, 2021
- Genre: R&B
- Length: 63:36
- Labels: LVRN; Interscope
- Producers: 9th Wonder; Active by Night; Archer; Boobie; Buddah Bless; Camper; Chrishan; Coop the Truth; Cue Sheet; Daniel East; Dijon Stylez; Dreamlife; Dylan Graham; Forthenight; Hitmaka; JayDot; JustAcoustic; Killah B; London on da Track; the Neptunes; Nineteen85; OG Parker; Remey Williams; Roark Bailey; Sean Garrett; Slimwav; Sonni; Summer Walker; Tee Romano; Tone Deaf; Xeryus; Young Rog

Summer Walker chronology
Over It (2019)	Still Over It (2021)	Finally Over It (2025)

Singles from Still Over It
- 1. "Ex for a Reason" Released: October 15, 2021; 2. "No Love" Released: March 29, 2022

Still Over It is the second studio album by American singer and songwriter Summer Walker. It was released through Love Renaissance (LVRN) and Interscope on November 5, 2021. The album features guest appearances from Cardi B, JT (from City Girls), Lil Durk, Pharrell Williams, SZA, Ari Lennox, Omarion, and Ciara.

Intended to be a sequel to Walker's debut studio album, Over It (2019), Still Over It was considered as a "story", exploring Walker's tumultuous relationship with her then-boyfriend and record producer London on da Track before through after her pregnancy. Each song has been aligned to a timeline starting from August 4, 2019 to October 7, 2021. The album shares a contemporary R&B appeal with 2000s R&B, neo soul, and trap elements throughout the record.

Upon its release, Still Over It garnered widespread acclaim from music critics and appeared on numerous year-end lists. Critics particularly commended the album's cohesiveness and introspective lyrics, and deemed it Walker's best album to date. Also a commercial success, the album broke the record for most album streams in a single day by a female artist on Apple Music. It debuted atop the US Billboard 200, becoming Walker's first number-one album, and the highest charting album from a female R&B artist since Beyoncé's Lemonade (2016). The lead single, "Ex for a Reason" (featuring JT from City Girls) was released on October 15, 2021.

== Background and recording ==
Following the release of Over It, Walker released her extended play (EP), Life on Earth, which was released on July 20, 2020, surprising her fans after announcing her pregnancy with then-boyfriend and executive producer of Over It, London on da Track. After giving birth to their daughter in March 2021, the singer hinted at new music on her social media platforms. In June 2021, Walker shared photos in the studio with artists Omarion, SZA, and Pharrell Williams. In early October 2021, Walker intended on appearing at the 2021 BET Hip Hop Awards' red carpet to announce her second album. However, due to COVID-19 restrictions (which Walker had been vocal about two months earlier), she was uninvited. Therefore, she shared the album announcement on social media, revealing the details outside on a projector.

== Concept ==
Still Over It is a sequel and/or follow-up to Walker's Over It (2019). Prior to Walker's publicized break-up with producer London on da Track and giving birth to their daughter, Walker became the face of social media controversy regarding their relationship. According to Walker, the album is considered a "story". The singer revealed the album's tracklist of which is organized as a timeline, with its 20 tracks, starting from August 4, 2019 to October 7, 2021. The dates hint at when the songs were either written, recorded, or developed, but symbolically represent the timeline after the success of Walker's debut studio album.

DeAsia Page of Pitchfork described Still Over It as a "journey through a messy and complicated breakup", which is directly based on Walker's relationship with the producer. According to an exclusive message Walker provided for Apple Music, Walker described the album as a reflection of her mistakes. Walker writes, "You don't have to guess if something is love. Love is shown through actions. Stop making excuses for people who don't show up for you. Don't ignore the red flags. And don't think you have to stay somewhere 'cause you can't find better—you can and you will. Don't settle for less—you don't deserve it and neither does your family."

=== Cover artworks ===
On October 25, Walker revealed two official album covers on her social media platforms. The main artwork, which is for the physical release, displays Walker holding her daughter, while on the phone in the kitchen. The digital artwork features Walker in a car with her hand towards the camera, fending off paparazzi. The physical artwork was photographed by Deun Ivory, while the digital artwork was taken by photographer Rolex, who notably shot the artwork for her extended play, Life on Earth (2020), and fellow American singer and songwriter Bryson Tiller's third studio album, Anniversary.

== Music and lyrics ==
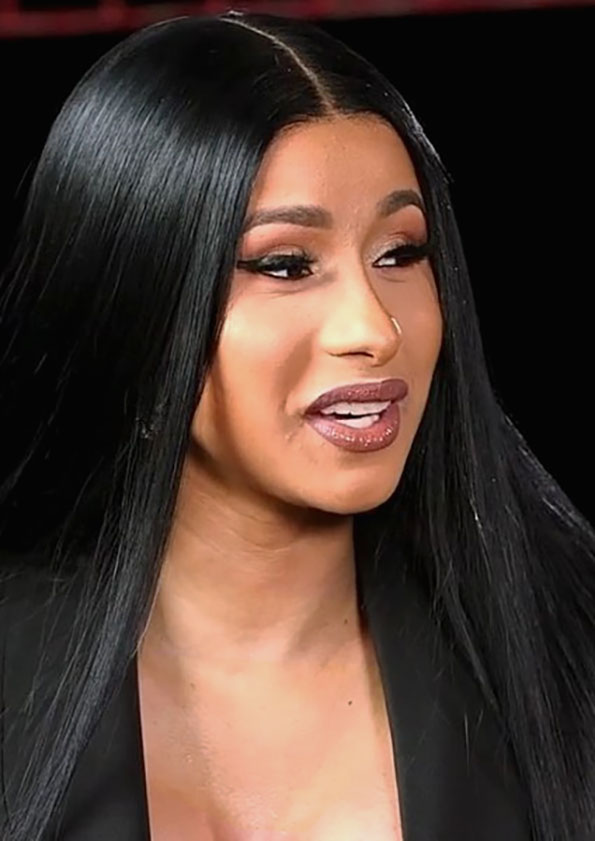
American rapper Cardi B's narration on the opening track supports Walker on dealing with public scrutiny of her personal life.

Still Over It runs for 1 hour and 3 minutes (60:03), and according to TheGrio, it follows the tendency started by Chris Brown's Heartbreak on a Full Moon of lengthier albums in the music streaming era. The album opens with a "hazy stream of consciousness" as the track "Bitter" addresses Walker's social media feuds with the mothers of producer London on da Track's children, which she had addressed on her platforms months prior. At the end of the song, Cardi B expresses her support of Walker, encouraging her to address her pregnancy in her music. The album transitions into the second track and lead single, "Ex for a Reason", an uptempo 2000s-inspired R&B track, which was produced by Sean Garrett. The song conveys "emotions behind dating someone that's moved on from a past relationship."

On the album's third track, "No Love", Walker, alongside fellow American singer and songwriter SZA, declare emotional detachment in favor of sexual gratification. The album's fourth track, "Throw It Away", samples Keke Wyatt and Avant's song, "Nothing in This World", as Walker mourns about a broken relationship. "Reciprocate" and "You Don't Know Me" both tackle the need for communication as her lover does the "bare minimum" to keep the relationship going. "Circus" and "Insane" are both neo soul tracks about efforts in keeping a complicated relationship together, although it affects her mentality. "Constant Bullshit" is another 2000s R&B-influenced track with layered harmonies reminiscent of singer Brandy. The song, along with "Switch a Nigga Out" continue the singer's grief of a fallen relationship, admitting her own flaws within it. "Unloyal" is a neo soul song with singer Ari Lennox and a saxophone solo, bringing both artists to a breaking point with their past lovers. Before the album's release, Walker revealed that her track, "Unloyal" is her favorite song on the album and commended Lennox's contributions to the track.

On the album's twelfth track, "Closure", Walker sings about ending an unhealthy relationship over a nostalgic R&B beat inspired by Aaliyah. The song transitions into "Toxic" with rapper Lil Durk, a song about a complicated relationship that comes with benefits. The album's fourteenth track, "Dat Right There", is a Neptunes-produced track, described as an upbeat, petty anthem similar to the second track, where Walker "emphasizes [her] sexual prowess" and boasts about taking other women's boyfriends. "Screwin'" is a slow R&B track, where Walker and Omarion exchange sexually explicit banter. "Broken Promises" is another slow track, where the singer confronts her past lover for not living up to his standards. The album's seventeenth track, "Session 33", follows up Walker's 2018 debut single, "Session 32", as Walker confronts London on da Track for his infidelity after her pregnancy. The album's nineteenth track, "4th Baby Mama", starts with a sample of Profyle's "Liar", and Walker begins with "I wanna start with your mama, she should've whooped your ass" to address London on da Track's infidelity and lack of support during her pregnancy. The album closes with a narration from singer, Ciara, delivering "an earnest appeal to Jesus to send her a deserving partner."

== Release and promotion ==
On October 2, Walker shared a photo of a jewel-encrusted hard drive with "Album #2" taped on the bottom; the post's caption linked fans to a separate Instagram account (of the hard drive) further promoting the album. On October 4, the second anniversary of Over It, Walker released a teaser via social media, sharing a skit featuring herself and City Girls member, JT. The skit involves a phone conversation between Walker, in the same attire from her first album's artwork, and JT, who appears in jail (similar to the artist's incarceration around the time of the debut album's release). On October 17, Walker announced a challenge in select cities New York City, Chicago, and Atlanta, where fans can listen to the album early by attempting to break a glass case with the album's hard drive inside. The challenge was featured heavily on TikTok.

The album was released on November 5, 2021, and available in both digital and physical formats, including a Target-exclusive, with an alternative black-and-white artwork and an additional a cappella bonus track of "Broken Promises". Walker also released limited copies of physically-written autographed CDs on her official website. After an instant sell-out, the singer released limited autographed copies in digital format, solely for fans who were not able to purchase an autographed CD. The digital version featured two bonus tracks: a cappella versions of "Circus" and "Constant Bullshit".

On November 8, Walker performed a solo version of "Unloyal" on The Tonight Show with Jimmy Fallon, making it her second appearance on the show and her first live performance promoting Still Over It. A day after, Walker performed songs from Still Over It as well as her past songs during a livestream performance exclusively for YouTube Premium subscribers. On November 28, Walker performed "Unloyal" alongside Ari Lennox at the 2021 Soul Train Music Awards, making it her second appearance at the annual ceremony after winning Best New Artist in 2019.

== Critical reception ==
Professional ratings
Aggregate scores
Source	Rating
AnyDecentMusic?	7.8/10
Metacritic	85/100
Review scores
Source	Rating
AllMusic	4/5 stars
Clash	9/10
Exclaim!	8/10
The Line of Best Fit	4/5 stars
NME	5/5 stars
Pitchfork	6.8/10
Rolling Stone	4/5 stars

Still Over It was met with widespread acclaim upon release. At Metacritic, which assigns a normalized rating out of 100 to reviews from mainstream publications, the album received an average score of 85, based on eight reviews, indicating "universal acclaim". Josh Abraham of Clash wrote the album "serves up Summer Walker's best work yet. It's brutal, yet romantic, it's fun, yet flirty, it's everything any listener could be wanting. A rollercoaster of emotions and she's not even finished yet." NME's Kyann-Sian Williams stated that "Walker has a song here for every feeling following a crushing break-up, from confusion to anger to outright pettiness – and it's the kind of unwavering quality that we all love her for." Megan Jordan of Rolling Stone opined that "Musically, Over It nodded to R&B icons of the Nineties and early 2000s like 702 and Usher. Still Over It builds on that sound, with poppier moments like 'Dat Right There,' and 'Ex for a Reason,' which features a hard-hitting rap from JT of City Girls. The sultry 'No Love,' featuring SZA, is a sex anthem about the need to sometimes 'fuck, get drunk,' without the messy emotions that could come with attachment. The album moves smoothly and slowly on songs like 'You Don't Know Me,' the Ari Lennox feature 'Unloyal,' and the sexy ballad 'Screwin,' showcasing both Walker's multifaceted voice and the excellent range of duet partner Omarion." Luke Ballance of The Line of Best Fit said although the album is "Littered with a variety of appearances from A-listers like Cardi B, SZA and Ciara over the course of its twenty tracks, it still finds Walker front and centre, with her characteristically introspective lyrics feeling more gripping than ever."

=== Year-end lists ===
Still Over It on year-end lists
Publication	List	Rank	Ref.
Billboard	The 50 Best Albums of 2021: Staff List	17	
Clash	Clash Albums Of The Year 2021	57	
Complex	The Best Albums of 2021	7	
HipHopDX	Best R&B Albums of 2021	—N/a	
The New York Times	Jon Caramanica's Best Albums of 2021	6	
NME	The 50 Best Albums of 2021	27	
NPR Music	The Best R&B Albums of 2021	—N/a	
NPR Music	50 Best Albums of 2021	28	
Rolling Stone	The 50 Best Albums of 2021	33	
Stereogum	The 50 Best Albums of 2021	38	
Time	The 10 Best Albums of 2021	5	
Uproxx	The Best R&B Albums of 2021	—N/a	
Variety	The Best Albums of 2021	9	

== Commercial performance ==
Still Over It debuted at number one on the US Billboard 200 dated November 20, 2021, with 166,000 album-equivalent units, becoming Summer Walker's first number-one album and the biggest first week sales for an R&B album by a woman since Beyoncé's Lemonade in 2016. It also had the biggest opening week of 2021 for an R&B album and the largest streaming figures for a female R&B album, with over 201.1 million streams of the album's tracks. The album broke the record for the most concurrent songs on the South African Music Chart, with all 20 songs debuting within the chart's top 100 in the week ending November 18, 2021. On October 1, 2024, the album was certified platinum by the Recording Industry Association of America (RIAA) for combined sales and album-equivalent units over 1,000,000 units in the United States.

== Track listing ==
No.	Title	Writer(s)	Producer(s)	Length
1.	"Bitter" (narration by Cardi B)	Summer Walker; Belcalis Almanzar; Derez Lenard; London Tyler Holmes; Arsenio Archer; Garrett Hamler; Aubrey Robinson	London on da Track; Archer; Sean Garrett^{[a]}; Boobie^{[a]}	4:41
2.	"Ex for a Reason" (with JT from City Girls)	Walker; Jatavia Johnson; Nija Charles; Holmes; Tyron Douglas; Hamler; Robinson	Buddah Bless; Garrett^{[a]}; Boobie^{[b]}	3:45
3.	"No Love" (with SZA)	Walker; Solána Rowe; Charles Ocasey, Jr.; Sony Ramos	Forthenight; Sonni^{[a]}	3:51
4.	"Throw It Away"	Walker; Charles; Jocelyn Donald; Holmes; Joshua Parker; Terrence Williams; Christian Ward; Christopher Dotson; Xeryus Gittens; Robinson; Myron Avant^{[c]}; Steve Huff^{[c]}	London on da Track; OG Parker; Tee Romano; Hitmaka; Chrishan; Xeryus; Boobie^{[a]}	2:31
5.	"Reciprocate"	Walker; Holmes; Archer; Robinson	London on da Track; Archer; Boobie^{[a]}	3:02
6.	"You Don't Know Me"	Walker; Jerome Monroe	Slimwav	3:20
7.	"Circus"	Walker; Taylor Hill; Holmes; Brian Vincent Bates; Robinson; Kendall Bailey	London on da Track; Killah B; Boobie^{[a]}; Roark Bailey^{[b]}	2:12
8.	"Insane"	Walker; Holmes; Monroe; Remey Williams; Bailey	London on da Track; Slimwav; R. Williams; Bailey^{[a]}	3:09
9.	"Constant Bullshit"	Walker; Holmes; Dijon Rasboro; Hamler; Robinson	London on da Track; Dijon Stylez; Garrett^{[a]}; Boobie^{[a]}	3:17
10.	"Switch a Nigga Out"	Walker; Evgeniy Shamov	Cue Sheet	2:57
11.	"Unloyal" (with Ari Lennox)	Walker; Courtney Salter; Holmes; Monroe; R. Williams; Robinson	London on da Track; Slimwav; R. Williams; Boobie^{[a]}	3:27
12.	"Closure"	Walker; Johntá Austin; Holmes; R. Williams; James Jarvis; Robinson; Bailey	London on da Track; R. Williams; JustAcoustic; Boobie^{[a]}; Bailey^{[b]}	2:11
13.	"Toxic" (featuring Lil Durk)	Walker; Durk Banks; Moreno Gijsbers; Dylan Graham; Jan Branicki	Active By Night; Dylan Graham^{[a]}; Dreamlife^{[a]}	4:26
14.	"Dat Right There" (with Pharrell Williams)	Walker; Pharrell Williams; Chad Hugo; Hamler	The Neptunes	3:10
15.	"Screwin" (with Omarion)	Walker; Omari Grandberry; Holmes; Darhyl Camper; Antonio Williams; Hamler; Robinson; Cooper McGill	London on da Track; Camper; Tone Deaf; Garrett^{[a]}; Boobie^{[a]}; Coop the Truth^{[b]}	5:33
16.	"Broken Promises"	Walker; Hamler; Jhaye McKie; Roger Atwell	Young Rog; Jaydot	3:03
17.	"Session 33"	Walker; Bubbles Renee	Walker	2:07
18.	"4th Baby Mama (Prelude)"	Walker; Hamler; Patrick Douthit	9th Wonder; Garrett^{[v]}	1:15
19.	"4th Baby Mama"	Walker; Monroe; Paul Jefferies; Gijsbers; Ashanti Guerrero; Roy Hamilton^{[d]}; Ernest Dixon^{[d]}; Tyrell Bing^{[d]}	Slimwav; Nineteen85; Active By Night; Daniel East	3:45
20.	"Ciara's Prayer" (narration by Ciara^{[e]})	Walker; Ciara Wilson; Monroe	Slimwav	1:54
Total length:				63:36

Target exclusive bonus track
No.	Title	Writer(s)	Length
20.	"Broken Promises" (A Cappella)	Walker	2:45
Total length:			64:27

Limited digital edition
No.	Title	Writer(s)	Length
21.	"Circus" (a cappella)	Walker; Hill; Holmes; Bates; Robinson; Bailey	2:00
22.	"Constant Bullshit" (a cappella)	Walker; Holmes; Rasboro; Hamler; Robinson	3:00
Total length:			68:36

Notes

- ^{^[a]} indicates a co-producer.
- ^{^[b]} indicates an additional producer.
- ^{^[v]} indicates a vocal producer.
- ^{^[e]} "Ciara's Prayer" is only included on digital versions of the album.

Sample credits

- ^{^[c]} "Throw It Away" interpolates "Nothing in This World", written by Steve 'Stone' Huff, as performed by Keke Wyatt and Avant.
- ^{^[d]} "4th Baby Mama" contains a sample of "Liar", written by Roy Hamilton, Ernest Dixon, and Tyrell Bing, as performed by Profyle.

== Personnel ==
Musicians

- Summer Walker – vocals (all tracks), guitar (6, 17)
- Cardi B – narrator (1)
- JT – rap vocals (2)
- SZA – vocals (3)
- Ari Lennox – vocals (11)
- Lil Durk – vocals (13)
- Pharrell Williams – vocals (14)
- Omarion – vocals (15)
- Ciara – narrator (20)
- Sean Garrett – background vocals (1–5, 7, 9–10, 12–16), vocals (18)
- Nija Charles – additional vocals (2)
- The Neptunes – instrumental ensemble (14)

Technical

- Sean Garrett – vocal producer (3–5, 10, 12, 14, 16, 18)
- Colin Leonard – master engineering (all tracks)
- David "Dos Dias" Bishop – record engineering (1–18)
- Rob Bisel – record engineering (3)
- Mike Larson – record engineering (14)
- Morgan David – record engineering (14)
- MixedbyAli – mixer
- Cyrus "NOIS" Taghipour – mixer (2)
- Curtis "Sircut" Bye – assistant mixer

== Charts ==
=== Weekly charts ===
Weekly chart performance for Still Over It
Chart (2021)	Peak position
Australian Albums (ARIA)	18
Belgian Albums (Ultratop Flanders)	21
Belgian Albums (Ultratop Wallonia)	30
Canadian Albums (Billboard)	3
Danish Albums (Hitlisten)	36
Dutch Albums (Album Top 100)	8
French Albums (SNEP)	27
Irish Albums (Official Charts)	22
New Zealand Albums (RMNZ)	13
Norwegian Albums (VG-lista)	18
Swedish Albums (Sverigetopplistan)	59
Swiss Albums (Schweizer Hitparade)	18
UK Albums (Official Charts)	5
UK R&B Albums (Official Charts)	3
US Billboard 200	1
US Top R&B/Hip-Hop Albums (Billboard)	1

=== Year-end charts ===
2022 year-end chart performance for Still Over It
Chart (2022)	Position
US Billboard 200	19
US Top R&B/Hip-Hop Albums (Billboard)	18

== Certifications ==
Certifications for Still Over It
Region	Certification	Certified units/sales
New Zealand (RMNZ)	Gold	7,500^{‡}
United Kingdom (BPI)	Gold	100,000^{‡}
United States (RIAA)	Platinum	1,000,000^{‡}
^{‡} Sales+streaming figures based on certification alone.
