= Good Love (City Girls song) =

2022 single by City Girls featuring Usher

Single by City Girls featuring Usher

from the album RAW
- Released: July 1, 2022
- Length: 3:52
- Label: Quality Control; Motown
- Songwriters: Caresha Brownlee; Jatavia Johnson; Usher Raymond IV; Corey Dennard; Jonathan Smith; Kinta Cox; Lathun Grady; Luther Campbell; Nija Charles; Paul Lewis; Rick Finch; Tony Butler
- Producer: Mr. Hanky

City Girls singles chronology
"Top Notch" (2022)	"Good Love" (2022)	"Act Bad" (2023)

Usher singles chronology
"Too Much" (2021)	"Good Love" (2022)	"Glu" (2023)

Music video
- "Good Love" on YouTube

"Good Love" is a song by American hip hop duo City Girls featuring American singer Usher, released on July 1, 2022, through Quality Control Music and Motown Records as the first single of the duo's third studio album, RAW (2023). Produced by Mr. Hanky, it contains a sample of "Freak It" by singer Lathun.

== Background ==
City Girls teased the song during an interview at the 2022 Billboard Music Awards. Yung Miami described it as a "party record, fun record, cookout record", and said she was a big fan of Usher when growing up.

== Composition ==
An uptempo song, "Good Love" is backed by an electro beat sampled from "Freak It". Usher opens the song and in the chorus he sings about how he can give love to one in the bedroom. He is also joined by Yung Miami, who follows with the first verse in which she boasts her sexuality and interpolates lyrics from both songs "I Wanna Rock" and "Breakdown" by Uncle Luke. In the second verse, JT boasts her wealth and details her expectations to the men that pursue them.

== Music video ==
The music video was directed by Daps and released alongside the single. It was filmed at the Atlanta roller rink Cascade, where the artists are seen partying with friends, in scenes shifting between the dim indoors and the parking lot. They show off dance moves, with shots of twerking, while a cookout in the front yard of Cascade also takes place.

== Charts ==
Chart performance for "Good Love"
Chart (2022)	Peak position
US Billboard Hot 100	70
US Hot R&B/Hip-Hop Songs (Billboard)	16
US Rhythmic Airplay (Billboard)	5
