= 2019 BET Hip Hop Awards =

Annual edition of the awards show

- Date: October 9, 2019
- Location: Cobb Energy Performing Arts Centre, Atlanta, Georgia
- Hosted by: Lil Duval
- Most wins: J. Cole (3)
- Most nominations: Cardi B (10)

The 2019 BET Hip Hop Awards was a recognition ceremony held on TV on October 9, 2019 from the Atlanta's Cobb Energy Center. The nominations were announced on September 12, 2019.

After notching four wins at the previous year's festivities, Cardi B lead with 10 nominations in 2019.

There was a three-way tie for second most nominations as DJ Khaled, Travis Scott and J. Cole were each nominated eight times. Despite his death earlier in the year, Nipsey Hussle received five nominations. Newcomer Megan Thee Stallion received five, and DaBaby four.

== Cyphers ==
- Cypher 1 - Kash Doll, IDK, Travis Thompson, Iman Shumpert & King Los
- Cypher 2 - Jess Hilarious, Chico Bean, Karlous Miller, Affion Crockett & Lil Duval

== Winners and nominees ==
=== Best Hip Hop Video ===
Cardi B – "Money"

- 21 Savage featuring J. Cole – "A Lot"
- City Girls featuring Cardi B – "Twerk"
- DaBaby – "Suge"
- Meek Mill featuring Drake – "Going Bad"
- Travis Scott featuring Drake – "Sicko Mode"

=== Best Collabo, Duo or Group ===
Lil Nas X featuring Billy Ray Cyrus – "Old Town Road (Remix)"

- 21 Savage featuring J. Cole – "A Lot"
- Cardi B and Bruno Mars – "Please Me"
- DJ Khaled featuring Nipsey Hussle and John Legend – "Higher"
- Lil Baby and Gunna – "Drip Too Hard"
- Travis Scott featuring Drake – "Sicko Mode"

=== Hot Ticket Performer ===
Megan Thee Stallion

- Cardi B
- DaBaby
- Drake
- The Carters
- Travis Scott

=== Lyricist of the Year ===
J. Cole

- 2 Chainz
- Cordae
- Drake
- Meek Mill
- Nipsey Hussle

=== Video Director of the Year ===
Travis Scott

- Benny Boom
- Bruno Mars and Florent Dechard
- Dave Meyers
- Eif Rivera

=== DJ of the Year ===
Mustard

- Chase B
- DJ Drama
- DJ Envy
- DJ Esco
- DJ Khaled

=== Producer of the Year ===
DJ Khaled

- London On Da Track
- Metro Boomin
- Mustard
- Swizz Beatz
- Tay Keith

=== MVP of the Year ===
Nipsey Hussle

- Cardi B
- DJ Khaled
- Drake
- J. Cole
- Megan Thee Stallion

=== Single of the Year ===
Only the producer of the track nominated in this category.

"Old Town Road (Remix)" – Produced by YoungKio (Lil Nas X featuring Billy Ray Cyrus)

- "Act Up" – Produced by EarlThePearll (City Girls)
- "Big Ole Freak" – Produced by LilJuMadeDaBeat (Megan Thee Stallion)
- "Money" – Produced by J. White Did It (Cardi B)
- "Sicko Mode" – Produced by Rogét Chahayed, Cubeatz, OZ, Hit-Boy and Tay Keith (Travis Scott featuring Drake)
- "Suge" – Produced by JetsonMade and Pooh Beatz (DaBaby)

=== Album of the Year ===
Travis Scott – Astroworld

- Meek Mill – Championships
- Lizzo – Cuz I Love You
- DJ Khaled – Father of Asahd
- Tyler, the Creator – Igor
- Dreamville – Revenge of the Dreamers 3

=== Best New Hip Hop Artist ===
DaBaby

- Blueface
- Lil Nas X
- Megan Thee Stallion
- Roddy Ricch
- Cordae

=== Hustler of the Year ===
JAY-Z

- Cardi B
- DJ Khaled
- Nipsey Hussle
- Rick Ross
- Travis Scott

=== Made-You-Look Award (Best Hip Hop Style) ===
Cardi B

- DJ Khaled
- French Montana
- Meek Mill
- Rick Ross
- Travis Scott

=== Best Mixtape ===
Megan Thee Stallion – Fever

- Jack Harlow – Loose
- Kevin Gates – Luca Brasi 3
- Roddy Ricch – Feed Tha Streets II
- Wiz Khalifa and Curren$y – 2009
- YBN Almighty Jay, Cordae and YBN Nahmir – YBN: The Mixtape

=== Sweet 16: Best Featured Verse ===
J. Cole – "A Lot" (21 Savage featuring J. Cole)

- 21 Savage – "Wish Wish" (DJ Khaled featuring Cardi B and 21 Savage)
- Cardi B – "Clout" (Offset featuring Cardi B)
- Cardi B – "Twerk" (City Girls featuring Cardi B)
- Rick Ross – "Money in the Grave" (Drake featuring Rick Ross)
- Rick Ross – "What's Free" (Meek Mill featuring JAY-Z and Rick Ross)

=== Impact Track ===
J. Cole – "Middle Child"

- 21 Savage featuring J. Cole – "A Lot"
- DJ Khaled featuring Nipsey Hussle and John Legend – "Higher"
- Kap G – "A Day Without a Mexican"
- Lizzo featuring Missy Elliott – "Tempo"
- YoungBoy Never Broke Again featuring Quando Rondo and Kevin Gates – "I Am Who They Say I Am"

=== Best International Flow ===
Sarkodie (Ghana)

- Falz (Nigeria)
- Ghetts (UK)
- Kalash (France)
- Little Simz (UK)
- Nasty C (South Africa)
- Tory Lanez (Canada)

=== Best Hip-Hop Online Site/App ===
Complex

- All Hip-Hop
- HotNewHipHop
- The Shade Room
- WorldStar
- XXL

=== I Am Hip Hop Icon ===
Lil’ Kim
