= Twerk (song) =

2019 single by City Girls featuring Cardi B

Single by City Girls featuring Cardi B

from the album Girl Code
- Released: January 8, 2019
- Recorded: 2018
- Genre: Miami bass; bounce
- Length: 2:46
- Label: Quality Control; Motown; Capitol
- Songwriters: Rico Love; Belcalis Almanzar; Raymond Sneed; Darwin Turner; Caresha Brownlee; Jatavia Johnson
- Producers: Mr. Nova; Rico Love

City Girls singles chronology
"I Just Wanna" (2018)	"Twerk" (2019)	"Caramel" (2019)

Cardi B singles chronology
"Money" (2018)	"Twerk" (2019)	"Please Me" (2019)

Music video
- "Twerk" on YouTube

"Twerk" is a song by American hip hop duo City Girls featuring American rapper Cardi B, from the duo's debut album Girl Code (2018). It was released to US rhythmic contemporary radio on January 8, 2019, as the album's lead single. Filmed in Miami, the song's music video was released the same month. "Twerk" is a New Orleans bounce-inspired song, which heavily samples Choppa's "Choppa Style". It also samples the popular Triggerman beat, which is prominent among the New Orleans bounce scene. It peaked at number 29 on the US Billboard Hot 100 chart and was certified Platinum by the Recording Industry Association of America (RIAA).

== Production ==
"Twerk" employs a xylophone sounding melody, hand claps and "feverish" snares. In her verse, Cardi references Jermaine Dupri's "Money Ain't a Thang".

== Music video ==
Directed by Daps and Sara Lacombe, the music video was filmed in Miami, Florida in December 2018 and released on January 16, 2019. The video shows Cardi B and Yung Miami painted like a tiger and zebra, respectively, partying with a number of women on a yacht. In another location, at a construction site, they are joined by the top 20 finalists of the challenge sent by the City Girls, which consisted on finding "the world's greatest twerker." The clip closes with the winner of the challenge.

=== Reception ===
In Billboard Carl Lamarre opined, "the titillating video reaches its climax when the women hit the dirt and break into some next-level twerking. The mesermizing (sic) display will certainly drop some jaws, as both Cardi and Yung Miami redefine the meaning of twerk with their fun-filled visual." Complex's Sarah Montgomery stated "this isn't your typical bad b*tches twerking to a banger music video." Meanwhile Entertainment Weekly's Shirley Li described the clip as "incredible and hypnotic and very, very cheeky, in all senses of the word."

Conservative columnist Stephanie Hamill from right-wing news website The Daily Caller criticized the video, tweeting, "in the era of #MeToo how exactly does this empower women?". Cardi B responded, "it says to women that I can wear and not wear whatever I want, do [whatever] I want and that no still means no," and questioned Hamill for misleading the purpose of the movement.

== Awards and nominations ==
Year	Ceremony	Category	Result	Ref.
2019	BET Hip Hop Awards	Best Hip-Hop Video	Nominated	
2019	BET Hip Hop Awards	Sweet 16: Best Featured Verse	Nominated	
2020	ASCAP Rhythm & Soul Music Awards	Winning Songs	Won	

== Charts ==
=== Weekly charts ===
Chart (2018–19)	Peak position
Canada Hot 100 (Billboard)	70
New Zealand Hot Singles (RMNZ)	31
US Billboard Hot 100	29
US Hot R&B/Hip-Hop Songs (Billboard)	14
US Rhythmic Airplay (Billboard)	13

=== Year-end charts ===
Chart (2019)	Position
US Hot R&B/Hip-Hop Songs (Billboard)	57

== Certifications ==
Region	Certification	Certified units/sales
United States (RIAA)	Platinum	1,000,000^{‡}
^{‡} Sales+streaming figures based on certification alone.

== Release history ==
Country	Date	Format	Label	Ref.
United States	January 8, 2019	Rhythmic contemporary	Quality Control; Motown; Capitol	
