= Girl Code (album) =

2018 studio album by City Girls

Studio album by City Girls
- Released: November 16, 2018
- Recorded: 2018
- Length: 34:06
- Labels: Quality Control; Motown; Capitol

City Girls chronology
Period (2018)	Girl Code (2018)	City on Lock (2020)

Singles from Girl Code
- 1. "Twerk" Released: January 8, 2019; 2. "Act Up" Released: April 3, 2019

Girl Code is the debut studio album by American hip-hop duo City Girls, released on November 16, 2018, through Quality Control Music, Motown Records and Capitol Records. It was released six months after their first mixtape Period in May, and while member Jatavia Shakara "JT" Johnson was incarcerated for credit card fraud. The first single of the album, "Twerk" featuring Cardi B, became City Girls' first entry on the US Billboard Hot 100 after debuting at number 92; it has since peaked at number 29. The album's second and last single, "Act Up", reached the top 40 on the US Hot 100. It also reached the number one on Billboard's Rhythmic Songs chart in its July 6, 2019 issue. Eventually has peaked at number 26 on the Hot 100, making it the duo's highest charting entry.

== Background ==
City Girls released their first mixtape Period in May 2018; they received wider notice after being featured on Drake's single "In My Feelings", reached number one on the US Billboard Hot 100 that summer. JT had pled guilty to credit card fraud that January - and turned herself in for a two-year prison sentence in June; consequently, she and Yung Miami recorded much of Period and Girl Code during the same studio sessions.

== Critical reception ==
Professional ratings
Review scores
Source	Rating
Pitchfork	7.0/10
Spectrum Culture	3.5/5 stars

Upon its release, the album attained positive reviews. In a profile of the duo, titled "The Ferocious, Feel-Good Rap of City Girls' Girl Code," New Yorker music journalist Carrie Battan commended the album as "one of the more convincing and commanding performances of the year," and singled out the group as one of the few female rap artists to attain success.

== Track listing ==
Credits adapted from AllMusic.

No.	Title	Writer(s)	Length
1.	"Intro (#FREEJT)"	Kinta Cox; Caresha Brownlee; Diamond Smith; Zavier White	3:04
2.	"On the Low"	Jatavia Johnson; Darnell Matthew; Teiron Robinson	2:33
3.	"Panties an Bra"	Michael Clark; Johnson; Robinson	1:54
4.	"Twerk" (featuring Cardi B)	Rico Love; Belcalis Almanzar; Cecil Kirby; Darwin Turner; Dion Norman; Derrick Ordogne	2:46
5.	"Season" (featuring Lil Baby)	Marvin Beauville; Brownlee; Johnson; Dominique Jones; Darnell Matthew; Esdras T. Thelusma	3:22
6.	"Broke Boy"	Beauville; Brownlee; Diego Iborra; Johnson; Esdras T. Thelusma	2:08
7.	"Act Up"	Isaac Earl Bynum; Johnson; Miles McCollum	2:38
8.	"Clout Chasin'"	Bynum; Johnson; McCollum	3:03
9.	"Give It a Try" (featuring Jacquees)	Johnson; Ronnie Duane Smith Jr.; Matthew	2:38
10.	"Drip"	Benjamin Diehl; Christopher Fernandez; Johnson; Gamal Lewis; Tyronne Nelms	2:32
11.	"What We Doin'"	Ijah Jiru Cheatham-Stoute; Kinta Cox; Johnson	2:23
12.	"Trap Star"	Jahron Brathwaite; Daviar Daly; Johnson; Shane Lindstrom; Salvador Majail	2:22
13.	"Swerve"	Brownlee; Johnson; Nelms	2:51

== Charts ==
=== Weekly charts ===
Chart (2018–19)	Peak position
US Billboard 200	55
US Top R&B/Hip-Hop Albums (Billboard)	31

=== Year-end charts ===
Chart (2019)	Position
US Billboard 200	179
