= City Cinderella =

Mixtape by JT
- Released: July 19, 2024
- Recorded: 2023–24
- Genre: Hip hop
- Length: 40:49
- Labels: Quality Control; Motown; Universal
- Producers: Aire Atlantica; Akachi; Ambezza; Ben10K; Boys Are Rolling; Buddah Bless; Clams Casino; Cubeatz; Danes Blood; Damion Deron Williams; Dinuzzo; DJ Swift Productions; Dunk Rock; G. Ry; Julia Lewis; Jupyter; Kenoe Jordan; Kyle M Reed; LunchMoney Lewis; Omer Fedi; OG Parker; Rogét Chahayed; Shawn Ferrari; Tee Romano; Thank You Fizzle; TheRechordz; Xander Linnet

JT chronology
City Cinderella (2024)	Club Cheetah (2026)

Singles from City Cinderella
- 1. "Sideways" Released: February 2, 2024; 2. "Okay" Released: April 26, 2024

City Cinderella is the debut solo mixtape by American rapper JT. It was released through Quality Control Music, Motown Records and Universal Music Group on July 19, 2024. The mixtape features guest appearances from DJ Khaled, Stunna Girl, Clip, and Jeezy, while the production on the album was handled by Buddah Bless, Kenoe Jordan, Dinuzzo, and Take a Daytrip, among others. It also marks her first solo mixtape, after duo City Girls was disbanded.

== Singles ==
The second single from the mixtape, titled "Okay", was released on April 26, 2024, following the non-album single, "No Bars", and the lead single from the mixtape, "Sideways".

== Commercial performance ==
City Cinderella debuted at 27 on the US Billboard 200, earning 26,000 album-equivalent units in its first week, out charting any City Girls release.

== Track listing ==
City Cinderella track listing
No.	Title	Writer(s)	Producer(s)	Length
1.	"Intro (Hope)"	JT; Gamal Kosh Lewis; Omer Fedi; David Biral; Denzel Baptiste	LunchMoney Lewis; Fedi; Take a Daytrip	2:28
2.	"Brick Talk"	JT; Darrien Overton; Lasana Smith	Dinuzzo	1:39
3.	"Oh" (featuring DJ Khaled)	JT; Khaled Khaled; Maurice Jordan	Kenoe Jordan	3:18
4.	"Servin'"	JT; Antoine Edwards; Ayatullah "RU" Muhammad; Byron Thomas; Christopher J. Lee; Donny Flores; Elon DeAndre Brown; Juan Madrid; Kyle M. Reed	Jupyter; Reed; TheRechordz	2:49
5.	"DOD"	JT; Ahmed Sheta; Alex Papamitrou; Arno Sugarman; Miles Sugarman; Crosby Spagnoli; Kevin Gomringer; Tim Gomringer	Boys Are Rolling; Cubeatz; Xander Linnet	2:47
6.	"Lemon Pepper" (with Stunna Girl)	JT; Lucas Difabbio; Jordan; Suzanne Sade Brown	Dunk Rock; Kenoe	3:37
7.	"Swang"	JT; Carl McIntosh; Damion Deron Williams; Jane Eugene; Steve Nichol; Thomas Godbolt	Williams; DJ Swift Productions	2:04
8.	"90s Baby"	JT; Tyron Buddah Douglas, Sr.; Joe Thomas; Joshua Thompson; Michele Williams	Buddah Bless	2:07
9.	"Uncle Al"	JT; Ryan Martinez; Joshua Parker; Rogét Chahayed; Terence Williams; Craig McLaughlin; Douglas Ford; Edwin Nicholas; Gerald Levert; Hurby Azor; Smith; Raymond Davies	G. Ry; OG Parker; Rogét Chahayed; Tee Romano	3:17
10.	"Sideways"	JT; Benjamin McGregor Wilson; Dane McQuillan	Ben10K; Danes Blood	2:04
11.	"Okay"	JT; Bernard Freeman; Demetrius Stewart; Ernest Day, Jr.; Jay Jenkins; Smith	Akachi; Shawn Ferrari	2:44
12.	"JT Coming"	JT; Overton; Jordan; Isaac Freeman III; Melvin Barcliff; Timothy Mosley	Dinuzzo; Kenoe	1:48
13.	"All Stars" (with Clip)	JT; Shania McBean; Joseph Pincus; Michael Volpe	Aire Atlantica; Clams Casino	2:10
14.	"Red Flowers"	JT; Mathias Liyew; Benjamin Falik; Ford; Joshua David Goldenberg	Ambezza; Julia Lewis; Thank You Fizzle	1:39
15.	"Star of the Show"	JT; Jordan; Jesse Jones	Kenoe	2:21
16.	"Okay (Remix)" (with Jeezy)	JT; Freeman; Stewart; Day, Jr.; Jenkins; Smith	Akachi; Shawn Ferrari	3:57
Total length:				40:49

Sample credits

- "Servin'" contains an instrumental sample of "Real Big", written and produced by Mannie Fresh.
- "Swang" contains an instrumental sample of "Stay a Little While, Child", written by Carl McIntosh, Jane Eugene, and Steve Nichol, as performed by Loose Ends.
- "90s Baby" contains an instrumental sample of "All the Things (Your Man Won't Do)", written by Joe Thomas, Joshua Thompson, and Michele Williams, as performed by Joe.
- "Uncle Al" contains an instrumental sample of "Push It", written by Hurby Azor and Ray Davies, as performed by Salt-N-Pepa
- "Okay" contains an instrumental sample of "Trap or Die", written by Jay Jenkins, Demetrius Stewart, and Bernard Freeman, as performed by Jeezy featuring Bun B.
- "JT Coming" contains an instrumental sample of "Drop", written by Timothy Mosley, Melvin Barcliff, and Isaac Freeman III, as performed by Timbaland & Magoo featuring Fatman Scoop.

== Charts ==
Chart performance for City Cinderella
Chart (2024)	Peak position
US Billboard 200	27
US Top R&B/Hip-Hop Albums (Billboard)	5
