= Money (Cardi B song) =

2018 single by Cardi B

Single by Cardi B
- Released: October 23, 2018
- Recorded: 2018
- Genre: East Coast hip hop; trap
- Length: 3:03
- Label: Atlantic
- Songwriter: Belcalis Almanzar
- Producer: J. White Did It

Cardi B singles chronology
| "Taki Taki" (2018) | "Money" (2018) | "Twerk" (2019) |

Music video
- "Money" on YouTube

"Money" is a song by American rapper Cardi B. It was released on October 23, 2018, through Atlantic Records. The song was included on a digital reissue of her second studio album Am I the Drama? (2025). It was written by Cardi B with its producer J. White Did It. Its music video features Cardi playing characters in different locations, including in an art museum, a bank and a brothel. Cardi performed the song at the 61st Annual Grammy Awards, alongside the "Money Bag" instrumental. The song and its music video received acclaim and accolades including Best Hip Hop Video at both the 2019 BET Hip Hop Awards and the 2019 MTV Video Music Awards and a Rhythm & Bars Award at the 2019 Soul Train Music Awards. "Money" was certified quintuple platinum by the Recording Industry Association of America (RIAA).

== Background ==
On October 22, 2018, Cardi B announced that the single would be released the following Thursday. However, the song was released two days earlier due to a leak. The single's artwork features Cardi posing in gloves composed of gold watches and a gilded, chain-fringed hat.

== Composition ==
"Money" is a New York hip hop number, with Cardi performing over a stripped-down hip hop drum beat, bass tones and piano notes. Lyrically, it celebrates financial stability.

== Critical reception ==
Writing for Rolling Stone, Jon Blistein commented "Money" "boasts a stomping yet simple beat built around spitfire trap drums and stark piano strikes. Cardi rides the beat with characteristic aplomb, switching flows with ease as she unravels an array of punchlines and another instantly memorable hook." Carl Lamarre of Billboard opined the song "finds Cardi dashing back to her mixtape roots, flexing a steely flow over a thunderous beat." Tom Breihan of Stereogum wrote, "this is exactly the sort of song that Cardi B should be making right now. It's tough and immediate, and it projects the same larger-than-life sneer that made Cardi sound like such a revelation on 'Bodak Yellow' more than a year ago." Stephen Kearse of Pitchfork deemed the track "familiar yet fun," and added, "Cardi remains a direct and parsimonious writer, paring ideas down to their essence." Complex listed the song among the week's best releases, with editor Carolyn Bernucca praising the lyrics.

== Music video ==
=== Background and synopsis ===
Cardi portraying a statue in a glass case at the center of a museum room, surrounded by several of her previous looks.

In early December 2018, Cardi teased the music video on her social media pages, sharing a behind-the-scenes look at her outfit, a leotard and headpiece made of gold watches. The Jora Frantzis-directed video premiered on December 21, 2018.

The music video opens with a dancer swinging hypnotically around an invisible pole. Cardi makes her first appearance in a black and white dress, which she wears with a futuristic-inspired, halo-like headpiece in an old-world style room. She is surrounded by a group of women in garter belts, black fascinators and open blazers baring nipples. Cardi then appears as a statue in a glass case, being gawked at by wealthy attendees. The glass case is surrounded by several of her previous outfits on display. She also portrays a nude piano player and a breastfeeding mother in couture. In the following scene, a team of women take over the bank, as Cardi appears in a jewel-covered string bikini in a vault. The scene then moves to the strip club, with the rapper wearing a black leather corset showing off some moves on the pole and dollars flying all around her. She also makes an appearance as part of the audience in the club, wearing a massive version of a slanted hat.

The looks in the old-world style room scene and in the bank vault were inspired by Thierry Mugler's 1999 Playboy photo shoot and Lil' Kim's look at the 1997 MTV Video Music Awards, respectively. As of June 2020, the age-restricted video has garnered more than 100 million views, while the audio has accumulated more than 200 million views.

=== Critical reception ===
In Rolling Stone, Charles Holmes opined that the video "is a monument to celebration and opulent overload [...] The metaphors aren't subtle. In short, 'Money' showcases all of the personalities, characters and storylines that made Belcalis so compelling all 2018." Rachel Hahn of Vogue described the video as "a full-out catalogue of some of Cardi's most over-the-top fashion moments yet." Writing for Consequence of Sound, Lake Schatz said the clip "takes a seemingly mundane trip to the bank and turns into it the most sensual, lavish adventure, complete with sexual acrobatics and Cardi herself serving up one masterful outfit after another." He further added, "if Bank of America somehow became a posh strip club and French art museum all in one, this is the setting of [the video]." Nick Romano of Entertainment Weekly noted Cardi "embraces her early beginnings as a stripper in New York." Dayna Haffeden of XXL thought it "shows that she's the true definition of a boss," while Erica Gonzales of Harper's Bazaar felt the "ostentatious and unsubtle" visuals are "full of epic moments." W magazine's Katherine Cusumano deemed the video "brilliant" and noted Cardi's first scene in the video with the group of women as "the male gaze so often seen in music videos—especially rap videos—inverted."

== Live performance ==
Cardi B gave the first televised performance of "Money" at the 61st Annual Grammy Awards. Pianist Chloe Flower opened the number, followed by Cardi in a tiger-print bodysuit and floor-length purple jacket, at the top of a set of risers fashioned like lilac vinyl couches, before taking her place atop the piano. She closed the performance wearing a large peacock feather fan. The look is from 1995 Mugler's couture collection, originally shown on the 20th anniversary of the French fashion house.

Writing for Rolling Stone, Brittany Spanos noted "the rapper embraced her inner showgirl during a lush performance... The set had touches of Las Vegas showmanship as she vamped atop the bedazzled piano and later danced in front of a large peacock feather fan." In Billboard, Taylor Weatherby wrote, "the performance put Cardi's panache at the forefront as she strutted across the stage, with none of the sparkles and choreography taking away from her impressive vocal performance."

== Awards and nominations ==
| Year | Ceremony | Category | Result | Ref. |
|---|---|---|---|---|
| 2019 | BET Awards | Video of the Year | Nominated | |
| 2019 | BET Hip Hop Awards | Best Hip Hop Video | Won | |
| 2019 | BET Hip Hop Awards | Single of the Year | Nominated | |
| 2019 | MTV Video Music Awards | Best Hip-Hop Video | Won | |
| 2019 | Soul Train Music Awards | Rhythm & Bars Award | Won | |
| 2020 | ASCAP Rhythm & Soul Music Awards | Winning Songs | Won | |
| 2020 | BMI R&B/Hip-Hop Awards | Winning Songs | Won | |

== Charts ==
=== Weekly charts ===
| Chart (2018–2019) | Peak position |
|---|---|
| Australia (ARIA) | 65 |
| Belgium (Ultratip Bubbling Under Flanders) | 23 |
| Canada Hot 100 (Billboard) | 30 |
| Greece (IFPI) | 15 |
| Ireland (IRMA) | 35 |
| Lithuania (AGATA) | 49 |
| New Zealand (Recorded Music NZ) | 36 |
| Portugal (AFP) | 100 |
| Scottish Singles Sales (Official Charts) | 66 |
| Slovakia Singles Digital (ČNS IFPI) | 76 |
| Sweden Heatseeker (Sverigetopplistan) | 9 |
| UK Singles (Official Charts) | 35 |
| UK Hip Hop/R&B (Official Charts) | 17 |
| US Billboard Hot 100 | 13 |
| US Hot R&B/Hip-Hop Songs (Billboard) | 7 |
| US R&B/Hip-Hop Airplay (Billboard) | 1 |
| US Rhythmic Airplay (Billboard) | 2 |

=== Year-end charts ===
| Chart (2019) | Position |
|---|---|
| US Billboard Hot 100 | 38 |
| US Hot R&B/Hip-Hop Songs (Billboard) | 18 |
| US Rhythmic (Billboard) | 22 |
| US Rolling Stone Top 100 | 58 |

== Certifications ==
| Region | Certification | Certified units/sales |
|---|---|---|
| Australia (ARIA) | 3× Platinum | 210,000^{‡} |
| Canada (Music Canada) | 5× Platinum | 400,000^{‡} |
| France (SNEP) | Gold | 100,000^{‡} |
| New Zealand (RMNZ) | 2× Platinum | 60,000^{‡} |
| Poland (ZPAV) | Gold | 25,000^{‡} |
| Portugal (AFP) | Gold | 5,000^{‡} |
| United Kingdom (BPI) | Platinum | 600,000^{‡} |
| United States (RIAA) | 5× Platinum | 5,000,000^{‡} |
^{‡} Sales+streaming figures based on certification alone.

== Release history ==
| Region | Date | Format | Label | Ref. |
|---|---|---|---|---|
| Various | October 23, 2018 | Streaming; digital download | Atlantic; WEA International | |
