= No Love (Summer Walker and SZA song) =

2022 single by Summer Walker, SZA, and Cardi B

- Extended version cover

Single by Summer Walker and SZA

from the album Still Over It
- Released: March 29, 2022
- Genre: R&B
- Length: 3:51
- Label: LVRN; Interscope
- Songwriters: Summer Walker; Solána Rowe; Garrett Hamler; Charles Ocasey, Jr.; Sony Ramos
- Producer: Forthenight

Summer Walker singles chronology
"Ex for a Reason" (2021)	"No Love" (2022)	"Better Thangs" (2022)

SZA singles chronology
"I Hate U" (2021)	"No Love" (2022)	"Persuasive" (2022)

Music video
- "No Love" (Extended Version) on YouTube

"No Love" is a song by American singers Summer Walker and SZA from Walker's second studio album Still Over It (2021). The song was written by Walker, SZA, Sean Garrett, Charles Ocasey Jr and Sony Ramos, and produced by Forthenight. It was sent to rhythmic contemporary radio in the United States as the album’s second single on March 29, 2022. An "Extended Version" with American rapper Cardi B was also released on March 25, 2022 alongside a music video.

== Composition and lyrics ==
"No Love" is a pop-inspired "unflinchingly raw, exquisitely pretty R&B" song that sees Summer Walker and SZA "regret defending a man who isn't worth it", as Walker sings in the third verse: "Tried to act like I wasn't good enough in your eyes / Funny now that you callin', that you ringin' my line". The chorus of the song "works as a mantra" as Walker sings: "All I wanna do is fuck, get drunk, take drugs". They complain about the time that was wasted because of "emotional intimacy" not happening, "promising to only involve themselves in no-strings-attached relationships in the future" over the "groovy" bass-heavy production of the song, which is intended to "provide a foil to the two singers' voices, grants the pair room to display the full-range of their vocal talents".

== Critical reception ==
Writing for Clash, Josh Abraham wrote that "No Love" is "simply magnificent" and that "the soft, yet addictive vocals on this beautifully put together track allows for both artists to swim in harmony with each other". Meagan Jordan of Rolling Stone described the song as "a sex anthem about the need to sometimes 'fuck, get drunk,' without the messy emotions that could come with attachment". Kiana Fitzgerald of NPR Music felt that "Summer Walker's collaborations with other women stand out on the album", citing "the intentionally detached nature of" the song.

== Credits and personnel ==
- Summer Walker – vocals, songwriting
- SZA – vocals, songwriting
- Cardi B – vocals, songwriting (extended version)
- Sean Garrett – additional vocals, background vocals, vocal production, songwriting
- Forthenight – production, songwriting
- Sonni – co-production, songwriting
- MixedbyAli – mixing
- Curtis "Sircut" Bye – assistant mixing
- Colin Leonard – mastering
- David "Dos Dias" Bishop – recording
- Rob Bisel – recording
- Rehan Manickam - recording

== Charts ==
=== Weekly charts ===
Weekly chart performance for "No Love"
Chart (2021–2022)	Peak position
Canada Hot 100 (Billboard)	37
France (SNEP)	198
Global 200 (Billboard)	17
New Zealand Hot Singles (RMNZ)	5
South Africa (TOSAC)	9
UK Singles (OCC)	24
UK Hip Hop/R&B (OCC)	5
US Billboard Hot 100	13
US Hot R&B/Hip-Hop Songs (Billboard)	5
US R&B/Hip-Hop Airplay (Billboard)	8
US Rhythmic Airplay (Billboard)	26

=== Year-end charts ===
2022 year-end chart performance for "No Love"
Chart (2022)	Position
US Hot R&B/Hip-Hop Songs (Billboard)	31

== Certifications ==
Certifications for "No Love"
Region	Certification	Certified units/sales
Australia (ARIA)	Gold	35,000^{‡}
Brazil (Pro-Música Brasil)	Gold	20,000^{‡}
Canada (Music Canada)	Gold	40,000^{‡}
New Zealand (RMNZ)	Platinum	30,000^{‡}
United Kingdom (BPI)	Silver	200,000^{‡}
United States (RIAA)	2× Platinum	2,000,000^{‡}
^{‡} Sales+streaming figures based on certification alone.

== Release history ==
Release history and formats for "No Love"
Country	Date	Format	Version	Label	Ref.
Various	March 25, 2022	Digital download; streaming	Extended	LVRN; Interscope	
United States	March 29, 2022	Rhythmic contemporary radio	Original	LVRN; Interscope	
