= Okay (JT song) =

2024 single by JT

Single by JT

from the album City Cinderella
- Released: April 26, 2024
- Genre: Hip hop
- Length: 2:44
- Label: Quality Control; Motown
- Songwriters: Jatavia Johnson; Hunter Brown; Ernest Day Jr.; Lasana Smith
- Producers: Akachi; Shawn Ferrari

JT singles chronology
"Alter Ego" (2024)	"Okay" (2024)	"Ran Out" (2025)

Music video
- "Okay" on YouTube
- "Okay (Remix)" on YouTube

Remix cover
- Cover art of the official remix with Jeezy

"Okay" is a song by American rapper JT, released on April 26, 2024, as the second single from her mixtape City Cinderella. It was produced by Akachi and Shawn Ferrari. A remix of the song with American rapper Jeezy, was released on June 28, 2024.

During the tracking week ending May 11, 2024, the song debuted at number 74 on the Billboard Hot 100, marking JT's first solo charting song. Following the release of its remix, the song re-entered the chart, reaching a new peak of number 72.

== Background ==
On April 16, 2024, JT teased the song on social media, which later went viral.

== Critical reception ==
Megan Armstrong of Uproxx commented that "JT has gone hard for 'Okay,' her latest single that finds her bars going even harder" and "JT shouldn't have to try too hard to convince people on 'Okay,' considering the song oozes infectious confidence." Chris Malone Mendez of Forbes wrote "And though the rapper lives on the West Coast, the song would fit in well in her Miami home."

== Controversy ==
The lyrics "She ate crab legs, now her whole tooth missin' / Cheap ass veneers, you stay talkin' shit / Put a marker to this bitch, she's so counterfeit" were apparently aimed at rapper Cardi B, who in March 2024 posted a video of herself with a missing tooth, explaining that one of her veneers "came out while chewing on a hard-ass bagel". JT and Cardi B have been feuding since 2022. On Instagram, rapper Sukihana asked JT if the lyrics were directed at her, as Sukihana had broken her tooth while eating crab legs in 2022. Sukihana also said she did not feel like JT was dissing her, but wanted the clarification.

== Music video ==
A music video was premiered and released on April 29, 2024. It sees JT sporting Mowalola Ogunlesi-designed outfits and appearing in front of "vibrant backdrops", and features appearances from models Alex Consani, Aweng Chuol, Jalen Hopson, and Zoe.

== Remix ==
The official remix of the song with American rapper Jeezy, was released on June 28, 2024, alongside its music video directed by Gerald Victor, in which shows both JT and Jeezy dressed in all black. In the remix, Jeezy references his divorce with Jeannie Mai, saying he is "single as a dollar bill" and addressing Mai's claims of him endangering their young daughter by keeping guns in their house. In addition, he raps about how he "stays hot" in the midst of the Drake–Kendrick Lamar feud and maintains his status one of the most influential figures in hip hop.

== Charts ==
=== Weekly charts ===
Weekly chart performance for "Okay"
Chart (2024)	Peak position
New Zealand Hot Singles (RMNZ)	38
UK Singles Downloads (Official Charts)	90
UK Singles Sales (Official Charts)	100
US Billboard Hot 100	72
US Hot R&B/Hip-Hop Songs (Billboard)	22
US Rhythmic Airplay (Billboard)	20

=== Year-end charts ===
2024 year-end chart performance for "Okay"
Chart (2024)	Position
US Hot R&B/Hip-Hop Songs (Billboard)	60

== Certifications ==
Certifications for "Okay"
Region	Certification	Certified units/sales
United States (RIAA)	Platinum	1,000,000^{‡}
^{‡} Sales+streaming figures based on certification alone.
