= Rap Freaks =

2021 single by Yung Miami

Single by Yung Miami
- Released: October 29, 2021
- Genre: Hip hop
- Length: 1:44
- Label: Quality Control; Motown
- Songwriters: Caresha Brownlee; Marvin Beauville; Shawn Pierre; Jonathon Holder
- Producers: Don D; King Wizard

Yung Miami singles chronology
"Strub tha Ground" (2021)	"Rap Freaks" (2021)	"50/50" (2024)

Music video
- "Rap Freaks" on YouTube

"Rap Freaks" is a song by American rapper Yung Miami, released on October 29, 2021. It was produced by Don D and King Wizard.

== Background ==
In an interview with Billboard, Yung Miami stated the song is "showing love to all the rappers right now, it's nothing personal. I [named] a bunch of the guys who are on top, that's hot, that's poppin'. Nothing is personal, nothing is literal, I'm just having fun." According to her, she was inspired to write the song by a legacy of rappers creating sexually suggestive tracks with name-dropping. She additionally said of "Rap Freaks", "I've been thinking long and hard on it. I hope everyone just takes it as a song. I feel like I'm not being disrespectful to nobody or dissing nobody. It's just a fun song I wanted to do and recreate what some of the legends did before me. I'm just being an artist."

== Content ==
In the song, Yung Miami lists off many prominent rappers in the industry whom she would want (or not) to engage in sex with, and describes her ideal sexual encounters with each of them. The rappers that she references include Tory Lanez, Megan Thee Stallion, Lil Durk (mentioning him and his girlfriend India Royale), Lil Baby, DaBaby, Future, Meek Mill, Moneybagg Yo, Kodak Black, 50 Cent, Yo Gotti, Rod Wave and Diddy. Among them, Tory Lanez and Kodak Black are the only ones whom Miami says she would not have sex with.

== Responses ==
Megan Thee Stallion reacted positively to the song during an Instagram Live stream, in which she laughed about Yung Miami rhyming "roaches" with "buenas noches".

== Music video ==
The music video was released alongside the song. It is a red-and-black themed visual of BDSM-inspired scenes, showing Yung Miami clad in a black leather outfit, matching mask and latex and doing the splits on a ceiling swing, while the setting features paraphernalia such as whips and cages. The clip also shows framed photos of some of the male rappers mentioned in the song.

== Charts ==
Chart performance for "Rap Freaks"
Chart (2021)	Peak position
US Billboard Hot 100	81
US Hot R&B/Hip-Hop Songs (Billboard)	30
