= To Be Young =

2020 single by Anne-Marie featuring Doja Cat

Single by Anne-Marie featuring Doja Cat
- Released: 17 July 2020
- Recorded: 2020
- Genre: Pop
- Length: 3:24
- Label: Asylum
- Songwriters: Anne-Marie; Doja Cat; Brittany Amaradio; Louis Bell; Teo Halm
- Producers: Louis Bell; Teo Halm

Anne-Marie singles chronology
"Her" (2020)	"To Be Young" (2020)	"Come Over" (2020)

Doja Cat singles chronology
"Pussy Talk" (2020)	"To Be Young" (2020)	"Shimmy" (2020)

Music video
- "To Be Young" on YouTube

"To Be Young" is a song by English singer Anne-Marie featuring American rapper and singer Doja Cat. It was released as a single on 17 July 2020.

== Background ==
Anne-Marie began teasing the song on social media in the days prior to its release; revealing the lyrics "We're all a mess, but I guess this is what it feels like to be young", subsequently revealing the single's artwork.

== Charts ==
=== Weekly charts ===
Chart performance for "To Be Young"
Chart (2020–2021)	Peak position
Hungary (Dance Top 40)	6
New Zealand Hot Singles (RMNZ)	16
Scotland Singles (Official Charts)	36
South Korea (Gaon)	180
UK Singles (Official Charts)	74

=== Year-end charts ===
2021 year-end chart performance for "To Be Young"
Chart (2021)	Position
Hungary (Dance Top 40)	32

2022 year-end chart performance for "To Be Young"
Chart (2022)	Position
Hungary (Dance Top 40)	60

== Release history ==
Release history and formats for "To Be Young"
Region	Date	Format(s)	Version	Label(s)	Ref.
Various	17 July 2020	Digital download; streaming	Original	Major Tom's; Asylum	
Various	7 August 2020	Digital download; streaming	Acoustic	Major Tom's; Asylum	
Various	14 August 2020	Digital download; streaming	220 Kid remix	Major Tom's; Asylum	
