= Ex for a Reason =

2021 song by Summer Walker and JT from City Girls

Single by Summer Walker with JT

from the album Still Over It
- Released: October 15, 2021
- Recorded: 2019
- Genre: Pop rap; R&B
- Length: 3:46
- Label: LoveRenaissance; Interscope
- Songwriters: Summer Walker; Jatavia Johnson; Nija Charles; London Holmes; Tyron Douglas; Garrett Hamler; Aubrey Robinson
- Producers: Buddah Bless; Sean Garrett; Boobie

Summer Walker singles chronology
"Bullshit" (2021)	"Ex for a Reason" (2021)	"No Love" (2022)

JT singles chronology
"JT First Day Out" (2019)	"Ex for a Reason" (2021)	"Super Freaky Girl" (Queens Mix) (2023)

Music video
- "Ex for a Reason" on YouTube

"Ex for a Reason" is a song by American singer Summer Walker with rapper JT of hip hop duo City Girls, released on October 15, 2021, as the lead single from Walker's second studio album, Still Over It (2021).

== Background and composition ==
"Ex for a Reason" is an uptempo pop-rap song that conveys "emotions behind dating someone that’s moved on from a past relationship". Walker first announced the song via a teaser trailer on October 4, 2021. Walker revealed its artwork, along with the release date as October 15.

Andy Kellman of AllMusic described the song as "a Miami-meets-Atlanta bass jam and one of the era's most flavorsome crossover R&B hits."

== Music video ==
A lyric video was released to accompany the release of "Ex for a Reason" on October 15, 2021. The official music video, directed by Lacy Duke, was released on October 19, 2021. The video begins with Summer and her friends sitting at a local gas station and then riding through Atlanta, Georgia in an Oldsmobile 442 convertible with "Forever Atlanta" on the license plate, before later arriving to a house party. JT is seen rapping her verse while standing in front of a mirror.

== Charts ==
=== Weekly charts ===
Weekly chart performance for "Ex for a Reason"
Chart (2021)	Peak position
Canada Hot 100 (Billboard)	75
Global 200 (Billboard)	51
New Zealand Hot Singles (RMNZ)	18
South Africa (TOSAC)	27
UK Singles (OCC)	42
UK Hip Hop/R&B (OCC)	20
US Billboard Hot 100	33
US Hot R&B/Hip-Hop Songs (Billboard)	12
US Rhythmic Airplay (Billboard)	15

=== Year-end charts ===
2022 year-end chart performance for "Ex for a Reason"
Chart (2022)	Position
US Hot R&B/Hip-Hop Songs (Billboard)	98

== Certifications ==
Certifications for "Ex for a Reason"
Region	Certification	Certified units/sales
New Zealand (RMNZ)	Gold	15,000^{‡}
United States (RIAA)	Gold	500,000^{‡}
^{‡} Sales+streaming figures based on certification alone.
