= The Wine Down with Mary J. Blige =

2023 television primetime talk show

- Genre: Talk show
- Starring: Mary J. Blige
- Country of origin: United States
- Original language: English
- No. of series: 1
- No. of episodes: 2

Production
- Executive producers: Mary J. Blige; Ashaunna K. Ayars; Nicole Jackson; Lisa Erspamer; Jordan Davis; John Davis; Connie Orlando; Angela Aguilera
- Production companies: Blue Butterfly Productions; Davis Entertainment; Lisa Erspamer Entertainment

Original release
- Network: BET
- Release: March 1, 2023 – present

The Wine Down with Mary J. Blige is an American primetime talk show series, hosted by singer and actress Mary J. Blige, that premiered on March 1, 2023, on BET.

== Production ==
On December 16, 2022, the series was in development by BET.

On February 15, 2023, it was announced that the talk show would premiere on March 1, 2023. Due to COVID and higher production costs in New York City, the show took an unfortunate turn and was removed from BET Networks later.

== Episodes ==
| No. | Title | Original release date | U.S. viewers (millions) |
|---|---|---|---|
| 1 | "Sex, Love & Situationships" | March 1, 2023 | 0.48 |
Guests: Taraji P. Henson and Yung Miami
| 2 | "One-on-one with Curtis "50 Cent" Jackson" | March 8, 2023 | 0.48 |
Guests: 50 Cent
