= Crazy (Doechii song) =

Single by Doechii
- Released: April 8, 2022
- Length: 2:14
- Label: Top Dawg; Capitol
- Songwriters: Jaylah Hickmon; Kalon Berry
- Producer: Kal Banx

Doechii singles chronology
"Persuasive" (2022)	"Crazy" (2022)	"Bitch I'm Nice" (2022)

Music video
- "Crazy" on YouTube

Crazy is a single by American rapper and singer-songwriter Doechii. The song was produced by Kalon "Kal Banx" Berry. It was released on April 8, 2022 by Top Dawg Entertainment and Capitol Records.

== Music video ==
The accompanying music video, directed by C. Prinz, to the single depicts a chaotic scene, featuring naked dancers, an albino alligator, as well as Doechii recklessly spraying a gun around.

The singer expressed that “Crazy is about un-contained power, creativity and confidence. People call you crazy when they fear you or they don’t understand you. So when I use it in the song I’m reflecting that energy back on them to show them themselves.” Suggesting to a self-inspired song.

== Production and reception ==
Amidst the hype of her then chronologically last released single "Persuasive", suggests that we are "knee-deep in the year of Doechii as she continues to hold music in a headlock." according to an article writer at Ones to Watch.

The song was positively received, especially after a positive review from fellow American rapper Azealia Banks; "She got the Azealia Banks stamp of approval, what's there not to love?"
