= Alter Ego (Doechii and JT song) =

Single by Doechii and JT
- Released: March 29, 2024
- Genre: Hip house; pop rap
- Label: Top Dawg; Capitol
- Songwriters: Jaylah Hickmon; Jatavia Johnson; Zach Witness
- Producers: Doechii; Zach Witness

Doechii singles chronology
| "Pacer" (2023) | "Alter Ego" (2024) | "MPH" (2024) |

JT singles chronology
| "Sideways" (2024) | "Alter Ego" (2024) | "Okay" (2024) |

Music video
- "Alter Ego" on YouTube

"Alter Ego" is a song by American rappers Doechii and JT. It was released through Top Dawg Entertainment and Capitol Records on March 29, 2024. The song was written by both artists along with Zach Witness, who produced it with Doechii.

== Composition ==
"Alter Ego" is a hip house song. It contains synths similar to the ones used in the Robin S. song, "Show Me Love". It also samples Ayesha Erotica's unreleased song "Spread That Puss". Stereogum described the song as a "high-energy Eurodance-inspired pop-rap throwdown".

== Usage in media ==
In 2025, "Alter Ego" was used during a lip-sync contest between Crystal Envy and Lexi Love on the seventeenth season of RuPaul's Drag Race.

== Charts ==
Weekly chart performance for "Alter Ego"
| Chart (2025) | Peak position |
|---|---|
| US Hot Dance/Electronic Songs (Billboard) | 11 |

== Certifications ==
Certifications for "Alter Ego"
| Region | Certification | Certified units/sales |
|---|---|---|
| Australia (ARIA) | Gold | 35,000^{‡} |
| Brazil (Pro-Música Brasil) | Platinum | 40,000^{‡} |
| United Kingdom (BPI) | Silver | 200,000^{‡} |
^{‡} Sales+streaming figures based on certification alone.

== Release history ==
Release history for "Alter Ego"
| Region | Date | Format | Label | Ref. |
|---|---|---|---|---|
| Various | March 29, 2024 | Digital download; streaming | Top Dawg; Capitol | |
