= Jobs (song) =

2020 single by City Girls

Single by City Girls

from the album City on Lock
- Released: June 19, 2020
- Genre: Hip hop; trap
- Length: 2:01
- Label: Quality Control; Motown
- Songwriters: Caresha Brownlee; Jatavia Johnson; Adjane Azevedo; George Herrera; Marvin Beauville; Miles McCollum; Nathan Butts; Shawn Pierre
- Producers: Compose; Kiddo Marv

City Girls singles chronology
"You Tried It" (2019)	"Jobs" (2020)	"Pussy Talk" (2020)

Music video
- "Jobs" on YouTube

"Jobs" is a song by American hip hop duo City Girls, released on June 19, 2020 as the lead single from their second studio album City on Lock, which was released a day later. It was produced by Compose and Kiddo Marv.

== Background ==
After City on Lock leaked online in full on June 19, 2020, City Girls released the song a day earlier.

In a press statement, City Girls explained the song and its music video are about "independence and trying to have fun when the system or world feels like it can be working against you." The song revolves around how they do not have to work regular jobs because of their success in the music industry and are enjoying the fruits of their labor, with a general theme of encouraging women in an unstable environment.

== Critical reception ==
Kenan Draughorne of HipHopDX considered "Jobs" the best song from City on Lock. Likewise, Fred Thomas of AllMusic described the song as one of the "strongest examples of City Girls at their best, with a slick and simmering groove and both rappers flowing with superhuman confidence."

== Music video ==
The music video was released alongside the single. The beginning depicts City Girls as unhappy and antagonistic employees at a fast food restaurant, taking their frustration out on the customers. After an argument with their manager, they leave and return home. The rest of the video sees Yung Miami managing her OnlyFans account and JT planning for a lavish night out.

== Charts ==
Chart (2020)	Peak position
US Bubbling Under Hot 100 (Billboard)	3
US Hot R&B/Hip-Hop Songs (Billboard)	49

== Certifications ==
Region	Certification	Certified units/sales
United States (RIAA)	Gold	500,000^{‡}
^{‡} Sales+streaming figures based on certification alone.
