= Persuasive (song) =

2022 single by Doechii

Single by Doechii

from the EP She / Her / Black Bitch
- Released: March 18, 2022
- Genre: Dance; house; hip hop
- Length: 3:36
- Label: Top Dawg; Capitol
- Composers: Austin Daniel Brown; Kal Banx; Leoren Davis; Ivan Jackson; Zach Witness
- Lyricist: Jaylah Hickmon
- Producer: Kal Banx

Doechii singles chronology
"What's Your Name?" (2020)	"Persuasive" (2022)	"Crazy" (2022)

Music video
- "Persuasive" on YouTube

"Persuasive" is a song by American rapper and singer Doechii. It was released through Top Dawg on March 18, 2022. A remix featuring SZA was later released on July 22, 2022, as the second single to her second EP She / Her / Black Bitch. This version was featured in the 2023 video game MLB The Show 23.

== Background ==
American rapper Doechii began her music career under the stage name Iamdoechii, uploading her first songs on SoundCloud in 2016 and releasing the EP Coven Music Session: Vol. 1 in 2019. Her next project, Oh the Places You'll Go, spawned her breakout track, "Yucky Blucky Fruitcake". The song went viral on the video-sharing application TikTok, and Doechii's newfound success landed her a 2021 collaboration with rapper Isaiah Rashad of the label Top Dawg Entertainment.

That same year, rumors began to spread about a recording contract with the label, to which Doechii said she could "neither confirm nor deny" them. She confirmed the speculation in March 2022, announcing she was officially signed to Top Dawg, as its first woman rapper, in a joint deal with Capitol Records. The announcement was accompanied by her major-label debut single, titled "Persuasive".

== Music and lyrics ==
"Persuasive" was written by Doechii, Austin Daniel Brown, Kal Banx, Oh Gosh Leotus, Ivan Jackson, and Zach Witness. The song is an uptempo dance track blending both house and hip hop music. Doechii said that her main reason behind the song's creation was to "uplift people and bring communities together."

The lyrics speak to the persuasive nature of marijuana and the feeling of getting high. Mya Abraham of Vibe described the song as "an anthem about late nights and questionable decisions".

== Music video ==
The music video for "Persuasive" was directed by Omar Jones and released on March 30, 2022.

== Critical reception ==
"Persuasive" received mostly positive reviews from music critics. Billboard placed the song at number 88 on their Best Songs of 2022 list, calling it a "buttery" track and a "stellar kickback". Grace Medford of DIY called the track a "sultry purr of appreciation for spending the whole day faded". The Fader placed the song at number 17 of their 100 Best Songs of 2022. Gyasi Williams-Kirtley of The Fader gave props to the song for allowing Doechii to show a more "mellow persona" and calling it "flirtatious, sharp, and provocative".

=== Year-end list ===
Publication	Accolade	Rank	Ref.
Billboard	The 100 Best Songs of 2022: Staff List	88	
The Fader	The 100 best songs of 2022	17	
Vulture	The Best Songs of 2022	8	

== Accolades ==
Award nominations for "Persuasive"
Year	Ceremony	Award	Result	Ref.
2022	MTV Video Music Awards	Push Performance of the Year	Nominated	

== Certifications ==
Certifications for "Persuasive"
Region	Certification	Certified units/sales
United States (RIAA)	Gold	500,000^{‡}
^{‡} Sales+streaming figures based on certification alone.

== Remix ==
"Persuasive" (remix)

Single by Doechii and SZA

from the EP She / Her / Black Bitch
- Released: July 22, 2022
- Genre: Dance; house; hip-hop; R&B
- Length: 3:30
- Label: Top Dawg; Capitol
- Songwriters: Jaylah Hickmon; Solána Rowe; Austin Daniel Brown; Kal Banx; Leoren Davis; Ivan Jackson; Zach Witness
- Producer: Kal Banx

Doechii singles chronology
"Bitch I'm Nice" (2022)	"Persuasive" (remix) (2022)	"Stressed" (2022)

SZA singles chronology
"No Love" (2022)	"Persuasive" (remix) (2022)	"Shirt" (2022)

Music video
- "Persuasive" on YouTube

=== Background and release ===
Doechii announced a remix for "Persuasive" with SZA in July 2022, with a video of her reaction to SZA's feature on the song. Both artists are under the same label, Top Dawg Entertainment.

It debuted on the Billboard Mainstream R&B/Hip-Hop Airplay chart at number 37 on September 17, 2022. The song ultimately peaked at number 33 after three weeks on the chart.

=== Music video ===
The music video for the "Persuasive" Remix was released on September 1, 2022.

=== Charts ===
Chart performance for "Persuasive (Remix)"
Chart (2022)	Peak position
US Mainstream R&B/Hip-Hop Airplay (Billboard)	33

=== Live performances ===
Doechii performed the "Persuasive" remix with SZA at Camp Flog Gnaw Carnival 2024, a festival curated by rapper Tyler, the Creator.
