= City on Lock =

Studio album by City Girls
- Released: June 20, 2020
- Recorded: 2019–2020
- Genre: Trap
- Length: 36:11
- Labels: Quality Control; Motown
- Producers: Juzicy; Audio Jones; Cheeze Beatz; Compose; Cubeatz; DJ Chose; DJOnDaBeat; Don D The Producer; Earl on the Beat; Kiddo Marv; MariiBeatz; Sean Da Firzt; Southside; Tay Keith; Traxamillion; Twysted Genius; Quay Global; Young Zoe Beats

City Girls chronology
Girl Code (2018)	City on Lock (2020)	RAW (2023)

Singles from City on Lock
- 1. "Jobs" Released: June 19, 2020; 2. "Pussy Talk" Released: July 6, 2020

City on Lock is the second studio album by American hip-hop duo City Girls. The album leaked in its entirety on June 19, 2020, whereafter it was released on June 20 by Quality Control Music and Motown Records. It serves as the follow-up to their 2018 debut studio album Girl Code and features guest appearances from Yo Gotti, Doja Cat, Lil Durk and Lil Baby. The album's first single, "Jobs", was released hours before the album release alongside a music video. The album's second single, "Pussy Talk" featuring Doja Cat, was released on July 6, 2020, alongside a music video.

== Recording ==
In September 2019, after a string of releases featuring artists like Cardi B and Lil' Kim, Yung Miami shared that she was waiting for the release of JT to start recording new music. JT previously began her prison term for credit card fraud charges in July 2018 after turning herself in to authorities. She was eventually released on October 8, 2019, having served 15 months in prison. Only a few days later, Quality Control executive Pierre Thomas announced that the duo already started recording their sophomore album and that it was slated for an early 2020 release.

== Release ==
On June 19, 2020, it was reported that the album was leaked in full to the internet. The album was subsequently released the following day.

== Critical reception ==
Professional ratings
Review scores
Source	Rating
AllMusic	4/5 stars
And It Don't Stop	A−
HipHopDX	3.7/5
Tom Hull – on the Web	A−
Pitchfork	7.3/10

City on Lock was generally well received by music critics, upon its release. Reviewing in his "Consumer Guide" column, Robert Christgau applauded the City Girls' "light, articulated rhymes" and declared, "What a relief to hear credible hoes rather than dubious cracklords brag about their cash on hand, to hear designer brands coveted as adornments rather than status symbols, to hear 'bitch' claimed by women rather than wielded by men." Fellow critic Tom Hull found the lyrics "over the top, but so are the trap beats". In the review for AllMusic, Fred Thomas said the album had "moments of tenderness are brief and understated, though, with the majority of City on Lock delivering amped-up, belligerent fun."

Kenan Draughorne gave the album a positive write-up for HipHopDX, claiming that "True to City Girl form, City on Lock is about scamming, tricking and full-volume boasts that simply don't hit the same without a subwoofer." The review by Pitchfork's Lakin Starling noted the growth in City Girls' experience, stating that "Yung Miami and JT come through with their signature amped-up party jams, while also making space to acknowledge what they've survived. It's a dynamic informed by their time apart during a trying period that required confidence and ambition to conquer."

=== Year-end lists ===
Numerous publications listed City on Lock in their rankings of best albums of 2020.

City on Lock on year-end lists
Critic/Publication	List	Rank	Ref.
NPR	Alyssa Vingan's Top 10 Albums of 2020	5	
Rolling Stone	The 50 Best Albums of 2020	13	
Rolling Stone	Jeff Ihaza's Top 10 Albums of 2020	8	
Rolling Stone	Rob Sheffield's Top 10 Albums of 2020	8	
Rolling Stone	Brittany Spanos' Top 10 Albums of 2020	3	
Vice	The 100 Best Albums of 2020	35	

== Track listing ==
City on Lock track listing
No.	Title	Writer(s)	Producer(s)	Length
1.	"Enough / Better"	Caresha Brownlee; Jatavia Johnson; Kinta Cox; Tyrone Nelms; Shawn Pierre; Marvin Beauville	Audio Jones; Don D The Producer; Kiddo Marv	2:44
2.	"Skit"	Johnson; Isaac Bynum; Miles McCollum	Earl on the Beat	0:37
3.	"Jobs"	Brownlee; Johnson; Adjane Azevedo; George Herrera; Beauville; McCollum; Nathan Butts; Pierre	Compose; Kiddo Marv	2:01
4.	"Broke Niggas" (featuring Yo Gotti)	Brownlee; Johnson; Mario Mims; Orville Hall; Phillip Price; Sultan Banks	Traxamillion	3:36
5.	"Pussy Talk" (featuring Doja Cat)	Brownlee; Johnson; Amala Dlamini; Joshua Luellen; Teiron Robinson	Southside	3:38
6.	"That Old Man"	Brownlee; Johnson; Chris Rosser; Ester Dean; Frank Brim; Harry Casey; Bynum; Keith Thomas; Luther Campbell; Melvin Hough II; Richard Finch; Rivelino Wouter	Earl on the Beat; Quay Global	2:55
7.	"City on Lock" (featuring Lil Durk)	Brownlee; Johnson; Brytavious Chambers; Durk Banks; Lasana Smith; Robinson	Tay Keith	2:19
8.	"Winnin"	Brownlee; Johnson; Darnell Matthew; Cox; Robinson	DJOnDaBeat	2:04
9.	"Come Outside"	Brownlee; Johnson; Deundraeus Portis	Twysted Genius	2:07
10.	"Flewed Out" (featuring Lil Baby)	Brownlee; Johnson; Darryl McCorkell; Dominique Jones; Kevin Gomringer; Tim Gomringer	Cheeze Beatz; Cubeatz	3:10
11.	"Rodeo"	Brownlee; Johnson; Jamarii Massey; Anthony Mosley; Smith	MariiBeatz; Sean Da Firzt	2:57
12.	"Double CC's"	Brownlee; Johnson; Luellen	Southside	2:12
13.	"That's My Bitch"	Brownlee; Johnson; Bryan Williams; Byron Thomas; Portis; Beauville	Twysted Genius	1:56
14.	"Friendly"	Brownlee; Johnson; Beauville; McCollum; Norman Payne	DJ Chose	2:59
15.	"Ain't Sayin Nothin"	Brownlee; Johnson; Michael Clark; Robinson	Young Zoe Beats	1:26
Total length:				36:11

== Charts ==
Chart performance for City on Lock
Chart (2020)	Peak position
US Billboard 200	29
US Top R&B/Hip-Hop Albums (Billboard)	17
