= Strub tha Ground =

2021 single by Quavo featuring Yung Miami

Single by Quavo featuring Yung Miami
- Released: October 22, 2021
- Genre: Southern hip hop
- Length: 3:14
- Label: Quality Control; Motown
- Songwriters: Quavious Marshall; Caresha Brownlee; James Hardnett; Kwame Buchanan; Miles McCollum; Sean Chavis; Zachary Thomas; Marvin Beauville
- Producers: Quavo; Budda Beats

Quavo singles chronology
"Alright" (2021)	"Strub tha Ground" (2021)	"Knots" (2021)

Yung Miami singles chronology
"Haterade" (2019)	"Strub tha Ground" (2021)	"Rap Freaks" (2021)

Music video
- "Strub tha Ground" on YouTube

"Strub tha Ground" is a single by American rapper Quavo featuring American rapper Yung Miami, released on October 22, 2021. Produced by Quavo and Budda Beats, it contains a sample of "Scrub Da Ground" by Miami bass trio Splack Pack.

== Background ==
Quavo explained the creation of the song in an interview with Complex:

I was sitting in my basement, and I heard this beat that Budda made. He played it, and I started out saying some shit like, "Sweep the ground, sweep the ground." But I wanted to say "strub the ground" because that's what that ass need to be doing when this song come on. You need to scrape—that shit need to strub the ground, like a sponge scrubbing the floor. It's basically cleaning the house with your ass. And so when I was thinking of that, I was like, "Damn, I got a full hook just saying 'strub to ground,' I got to put something on it." Then I went and got the sample. Then I had to grab the "strub the ground" queen herself and put my hands on that thing because her shit be scrubbing.

Quavo recorded the song first, and then played it for Yung Miami, who recorded her part on her own. The rappers made the song as an ode to Freaknik and said it was a "fun record we wanted to drop before the summer ended."

== Composition ==
The song is built on a sample of "Scrub Da Ground" and finds the rappers encouraging women in the club to twerk.

== Music video ==
The music video was released alongside the single. It recreates a street party at Freaknik, with dancing and women twerking. Quavo walks around filming the festivities with a camcorder, focusing on the crowds of twerking women.

== Charts ==
Chart performance for "Strub tha Ground"
Chart (2021)	Peak position
US Bubbling Under Hot 100 (Billboard)	13
