= Period (mixtape) =

Mixtape by City Girls
- Released: May 11, 2018
- Length: 43:38
- Label: Quality Control
- Producers: Audio Jones; Bigg D; Castro; DJ On da Beat; Lamb; LikOnTheBeat; Major 9; Mari Beats; Nikki Hot Beats; PB Large; Quay Global; The 90's; Young Zoe Beats

City Girls chronology
Period (2018)	Girl Code (2018)

Singles from Period
- 1. "Where the Bag At" Released: February 23, 2018

Period (stylized in all caps) is the only mixtape by American hip-hop duo City Girls. It was released on May 11, 2018, through Quality Control Music.

== Release and promotion ==
"Where the Bag At" served as the mixtape's lead and only single, and was released on February 23, 2018. The mixtape's lead and only single was later released to US rhythmic contemporary radio on October 9, 2018.

The mixtape was released alongside a WorldStarHipHop-exclusive music videos for "Take Yo Man", and "Tighten Up". Music videos for "Sweet Tooth", "Period (We Live)", "Millionaire Dick", "Not Ya Main" and "Careless" followed in August, September, and October, 2018, respectively. All the videos were shot before member JT was incarcerated on charges of credit card fraud.

== Critical reception ==
Professional ratings
Review scores
Source	Rating
Pitchfork	6.5/10

Upon its release, the album received positive reviews.

== Track listing ==
Track listing adapted from Tidal and XXL.

No.	Title	Writer(s)	Producer(s)	Length
1.	"Tighten Up"	Jatavia Johnson; Kinta Cox; Omar Wright; Tyronne Nelms	Audio Jones	1:59
2.	"Take Yo Man"	Bootsy Collins; Cainon Lamb; Derrick Baker; George Bernard Worrell, Jr.; George Clinton, Jr.; Hurby Azor; Johnson; Cox; Steven Kubie	Bigg D; Lamb	2:56
3.	"Sweet Tooth"	Esdras T. Thelusma; Ijah Cheatham-Stoute; Johnson; Marvin Beauville; Windell Durrant	The 90's	2:23
4.	"One of Them Nights"	Diego A. Iborra; Johnson; Cox	Castro	3:05
5.	"Not Ya Main"	Caresha Brownlee; Johnson; Teiron "Iceburg" Robinson; Zoe Michael Jay Clark	Young Zoe Beats	2:35
6.	"Where the Bag At"	Lamb; Baker; Johnson; Cox; Cubie	Bigg D; Lamb	3:20
7.	"Millionaire Dick"	Jamari Massey; Johnson; Cox	Mari Beats	2:55
8.	"Careless"	Christopher Fernandez; Johnson; Salvador Majail; Teleo Williams	PB Large	2:02
9.	"Period (We Live)"	Brownlee; Iborra; Johnson	Castro	2:34
10.	"Runnin"	Chad Thomas; Chris Rosser; Thelusma; Jamarii Massey; Johnson; Beauville	Major 9; Mari Beats; Quay Global	2:46
11.	"Rap Shit"	Brownlee; Darnell Matthew; Johnson; Robinson	DJ On da Beat	2:31
12.	"No Time (Broke Nigga)"	Rosser; Johnson; Cox	Quay Global	2:27
13.	"How to Pimp a Nigga"	Rosser; Johnson; Cox	Quay Global	2:50
14.	"Movie" (featuring Ball Greezy)	Johnson; Cox; Nicole Gordon	Nikki Hot Beats	3:35
15.	"Fuck On U"	Lasana Smith	LikOnTheBeat	2:51
16.	"Clear the Air"	Brownlee; Johnson; Wright; Nelms	Jones	2:46
Total length:				43:38

== Charts ==
Chart (2018)	Peak position
US Heatseekers Albums (Billboard)	16
