= Act Up (song) =

Single by City Girls

from the album Girl Code
- Released: March 27, 2019
- Genre: Bounce
- Length: 2:38
- Label: Quality Control; Motown; Capitol
- Songwriters: Jatavia Johnson; Miles McCollum; Isaac Bynum
- Producer: Earl on the Beat

City Girls singles chronology
"Caramel" (2019)	"Act Up" (2019)	"Soakin Wet" (2019)

Music video
- "Act Up" on YouTube

"Act Up" is a song by American hip hop duo City Girls from their debut studio album Girl Code (2018). It reached the top 40 on the US Billboard Hot 100. The song was released to US rhythmic and urban contemporary radio in as the album's second single March 27, 2019, eventually reaching number one on Billboard's Rhythmic Songs chart in its July 6, 2019 issue. It has peaked at number 26 on the Hot 100, making it their highest charting entry.

The song received significant media attention after it was revealed that rapper Lil Yachty wrote part of the lyric, along with head rapper JT. The song is sampled in "Hot Girl Summer" by Megan Thee Stallion featuring Nicki Minaj and Ty Dolla Sign, as well as "Midnight Hour" by Skrillex, Boys Noize, and Ty Dolla Sign.

== Remixes ==
"Act Up" has been remixed by numerous artists, including DaBaby, Saucy Santana, GloRilla, OMB Bloodbath, Erica Banks, SOB X RBE, and Moneybagg Yo.

== Music video ==
The music video for was released on City Girls' YouTube/VEVO page on May 30, 2019. It was one of several videos JT does not appear in, as she was serving a prison sentence after having been convicted of aggravated identity theft on fraudulent credit card charges. The video is set in Miami Beach, and co-stars Lil Yachty, who plays a news anchorman.

== Charts ==
=== Weekly charts ===
Chart (2019)	Peak position
Canada (Canadian Hot 100)	77
US Billboard Hot 100	26
US Hot R&B/Hip-Hop Songs (Billboard)	11
US Rhythmic (Billboard)	1
US Rolling Stone Top 100	60

=== Year-end charts ===
Chart (2019)	Position
US Billboard Hot 100	68
US Hot R&B/Hip-Hop Songs (Billboard)	28
US Rhythmic (Billboard)	25
US Rolling Stone Top 100	78

== Certifications ==
Region	Certification	Certified units/sales
United Kingdom (BPI)	Silver	200,000^{‡}
United States (RIAA)	3× Platinum	3,000,000^{‡}
^{‡} Sales+streaming figures based on certification alone.

== Release history ==
Country	Date	Format	Label	Ref.
United States	April 3, 2019	Urban contemporary	Capitol	
