= RAW (City Girls album) =

Studio album by City Girls
- Released: October 20, 2023
- Length: 44:04
- Labels: Quality Control; Motown; Universal
- Producers: Go Grizz; Mr. Hanky; Dr. Luke; Hitmaka; OG Parker; Smash David; Mike Will Made It; Tay Keith

City Girls chronology
City on Lock (2020)	RAW (2023)

Singles from RAW
- 1. "Good Love" Released: July 1, 2022; 2. "I Need a Thug" Released: June 8, 2023; 3. "Piñata" Released: June 9, 2023; 4. "No Bars" Released: July 14, 2023; 5. "Face Down" Released: August 25, 2023; 6. "Flashy" Released: October 20, 2023

RAW (acronym for Real Ass Whores) is the third and final studio album by American hip-hop duo City Girls, released on October 20, 2023, through Quality Control Music, Motown Records and Universal Music Group. The album was preceded by six singles: "Good Love" featuring Usher, "I Need a Thug", "Piñata", "No Bars", "Face Down" and "Flashy" with Kim Petras. The album also enlists guest appearances from Juicy J, Lil Durk and Muni Long.

== Critical reception ==
Professional ratings
Review scores
Source	Rating
Pitchfork	6.8/10

In positive reviews, Steven J. Horowitz of Variety, praised the authenticity of the album's message, while Jada Vernon, for Respect My Region, praised the versatility of styles and emotions displayed throughout the album. Maria Sherman, for Associated Press, also gave a positive review, highlighting "the no-skip, smooth transitions" of the album.

In a mixed review, Alphonse Pierre of Pitchfork commented that the album's name is "an attempt to convince the music world that their X-rated anthems of tricking and scamming haven't lost any edge" as the duo are "on a mission to regain their spot as the dirtiest, most provocative hitmakers in rap. Too bad they sound too splintered to get there" as "they don't feel like they're on the same wavelength nearly often enough".

== Track listing ==
RAW track listing
No.	Title	Length
1.	"RAW"	0:46
2.	"Piñata"	2:13
3.	"Static" (featuring Lil Durk)	2:47
4.	"No Bars" (performed by JT (Note: City Girls are credited as the main performers on the original release of the song.))	2:56
5.	"Line Up"	2:36
6.	"Show Me the Money"	2:06
7.	"Emotions" (with Muni Long)	2:47
8.	"Fancy Ass Bitch" (featuring Juicy J)	3:21
9.	"Good Love" (featuring Usher)	3:52
10.	"Work for It"	1:46
11.	"I Need a Thug"	1:57
12.	"Flashy" (with Kim Petras)	2:45
13.	"Wigs"	2:07
14.	"Face Down"	2:07
15.	"What You Want"	2:25
16.	"Tonight"	3:04
17.	"Survive"	1:57
18.	"Fuck the D to the A"	2:38
Total length:		44:04

== Charts ==
Chart (2023)	Peak position
US Billboard 200	117
