= City Girls =

American hip-hop duo

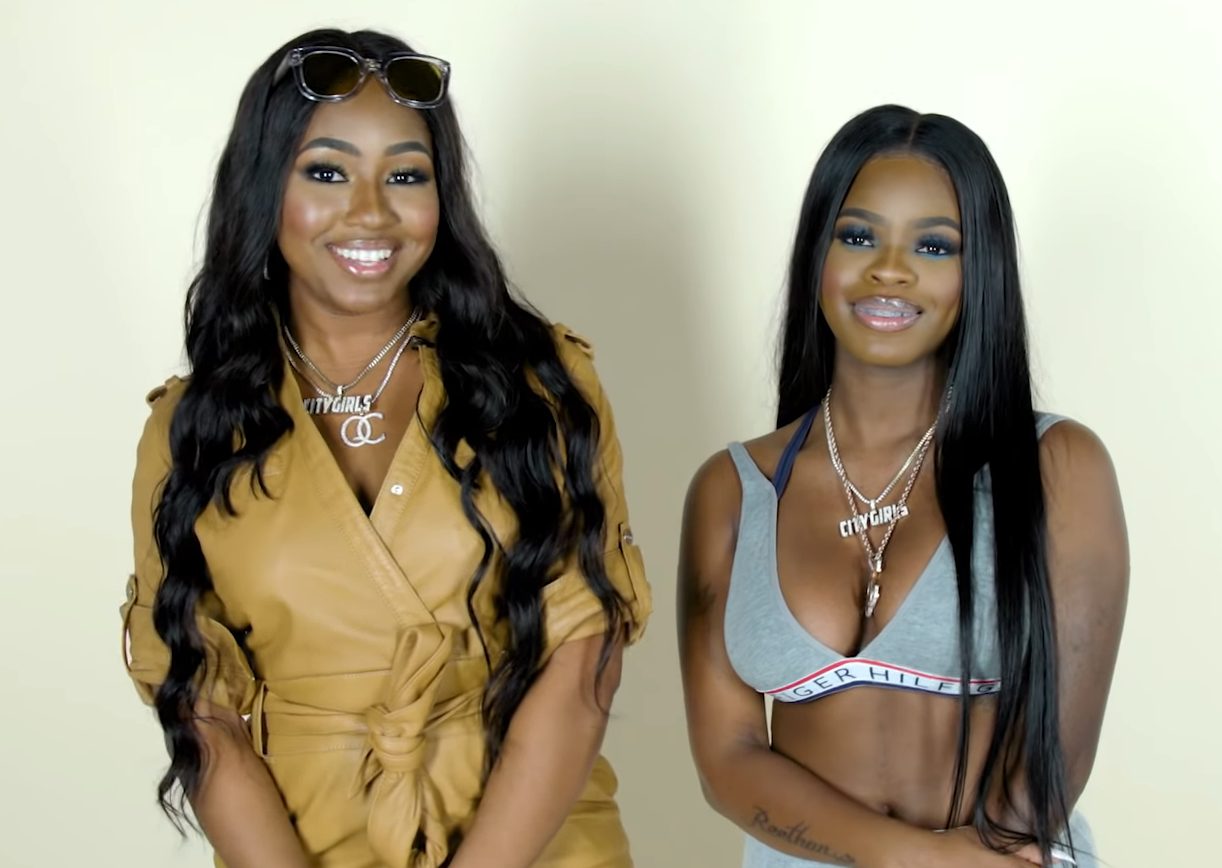
- City Girls in 2018

Background information
- Origin: Miami, Florida, U.S.
- Genre: Hip-hop
- Works: City Girls discography
- Years active: 2017–2024
- Labels: Quality Control; Universal; Motown; Capitol
- Past members: Yung Miami; JT
- Website: 305citygirls.com

City Girls were an American hip-hop duo consisting of Yung Miami and JT, both of whom originate from Miami, Florida. The duo signed with Quality Control Music, an imprint of Motown and Capitol Records to release their debut mixtape, Period (2018). Two months later, they garnered mainstream attention following their guest performances on Drake's 2018 single, "In My Feelings", which peaked atop the Billboard Hot 100.

Their debut studio album, Girl Code (2018) saw positive critical reception and was supported by the singles "Twerk" (featuring Cardi B) and "Act Up"—both peaked within the top 40 of the Billboard Hot 100 and received platinum certifications by the Recording Industry Association of America (RIAA). Their second album, City on Lock (2020) was met with continued praise and moderate commercial response, while their third album, RAW (2023) trailed critically and commercially. Shortly after its release, the duo announced a hiatus to focus on their solo careers.

== Career ==
The group's name derives from the pair being from Opa-locka and Liberty City, described by Complex magazine as "two of the roughest neighborhoods in Miami, Florida".

=== 2017: Early beginnings ===
The duo recorded their debut studio track, "Fuck Dat Nigga", which was a diss track towards their ex-boyfriends for not giving them money when they asked. Yung Miami promoted it through social media and by paying DJs to play it in clubs. Soon the track, which features a prominent sample of fellow Florida rapper Khia's "My Neck, My Back (Lick It)", racked up hundreds of thousands of plays. The official music video for the song came out in January 2018 and featured an appearance from rapper Trina. Later that year, the track was included in Quality Control's compilation album, Control the Streets, Volume 1.

=== 2018–2019: Period, Girl Code, and breakthrough ===
Shortly after the release of "Fuck Dat Nigga", JT was arrested and charged with aggravated identity theft, and was sentenced to 24 months in federal prison. The judge eventually agreed to push back her surrender date. JT began her prison term in July 2018 and was set to be released on March 1, 2020. While JT was incarcerated, Yung Miami continued to promote the group's music, by saying: "When she was in jail, I was going to strip clubs and I would pay a DJ 20 dollars to play the song. It started taking off."

After signing to Quality Control Music, the duo were ranked as the most popular developing artists of the week, according to the measuring activity across Billboard charts Hot 100, the Social 50, and Billboard 200. In May 2018, the City Girls released their debut mixtape, Period, which reached No. 16 on Heatseekers Albums the same month. Period also ranked 26th on Rolling Stone's 30 Best Hip-Hop Albums of 2018. In July 2018, the duo were launched into mainstream recognition after an uncredited feature on Drake's "In My Feelings", with Yung Miami appearing in the music video. In August 2018, they released the documentary, Point Blank Period.

In November 2018, City Girls released their debut studio album, Girl Code, which features vocals from Cardi B, Lil Baby and Jacquees. The album debuted at no. 63 on the Billboard 200 chart issued December 1, 2018. The two singles from the album, "Twerk", featuring fellow rapper Cardi B, and "Act Up", peaked at no. 29 and no. 26 on the Billboard Hot 100, respectively. JT was transferred to a halfway house on October 8, 2019, 5 months before her scheduled release.

=== 2020–2022: City on Lock and solo careers ===
In September 2019, Yung Miami confirmed to Ebro Darden on Apple Music's Beats 1 that the duo planned on recording a new album, expecting to release it early in 2020. On June 19, 2020, City Girls' second studio album, titled City on Lock, leaked in its entirety online. JT announced hours later that the album would be released at midnight of the same day. The album's first single, "Jobs", was released hours before the album alongside a music video. The album includes guest appearances from Yo Gotti, Doja Cat, Lil Durk and Lil Baby. In March 2021, their viral unreleased song "Twerkulator" amassed popularity on social media application TikTok, after 20-year-old dancer Layla Muhammad choreographed a dance for the song. The song had since been used over 1,100,000 times on the platform, with creators such as Charli D'Amelio and Malu Trevejo performing the dance; however, despite this viral restore, the song remained unreleased as the basis contains a sample from "Planet Rock" by Afrika Bambaataa and Soulsonic Force, which was yet to be cleared. On May 21, 2021, "Twerkulator" was officially released.

On October 29, 2021, Yung Miami released her debut solo single, "Rap Freaks", alongside its music video. As a sex-positive track, it sees her reference various rappers, including Megan Thee Stallion, Diddy, and Meek Mill. Miami explained that "the song is showing love to all the rappers right now, it's nothing personal. I [named] a bunch of the guys who are on top, that's hot, that's poppin. Nothing is personal, nothing is literal, I'm just having fun". The song debuted and peaked at 81 on Billboard Hot 100, becoming Miami's first entry as a solo artist. In 2021 she appeared on Migos & Quavo's "Strub Tha Ground". in March 2023, she appeared on rapper Lola Brooke's "Don't Play With It" remix, alongside rapper Latto. In February 2024, she released her second solo single, "50/50", as the first apparent single from her "YAMS era". in April 2024, she released her song "CFWM" featuring Detroit rapper Skilla Baby.

=== 2023–2024: RAW and hiatus ===
JT continued to have an active solo career, with appearances on records such as Summer Walker’s “Ex for a Reason” (2021), the “Queen Mix” of Nicki Minaj’s “Super Freaky Girl" (2022), and Kali Uchis' "Muñekita" (2023), Stunna Girl's "Like Dat (Remix) (2023), and Doechii's "Alter Ego". She also released a string of singles as a solo artist including "Sideways" and "Okay", the latter of which was a U.S. Billboard Hot 100 hit.

The duo's third studio album, RAW, was released in October 2023. The album was regarded as a commercial failure. The artists attribute its underperformance to "poor management", "bad timing" and the fact that they were based in different places at the time of the press run. The two rappers began to drift apart, and the duo split shortly thereafter. Yung Miami said in June 2024 that "it just wasn’t connecting, it just wasn’t working no more," and that they'd both agreed to focus on their solo careers.

The duo later featured on Camila Cabello's "Dade County Dreaming" from her album C,XOXO (2024)- although the pair are credited individually, the song was recorded before they separated. As a result, the song remained credited to City Girls on physical releases and the lyrics made numerous references to the City Girls name.

== Personal lives ==
JT grew up in both Carol City and Liberty City while Yung Miami grew up in Opa-locka. JT has said "my mother was an addict" and that "drugs ruined my childhood". At 17, they were performing in strip clubs, night clubs and block parties. Yung Miami said that she loved trap music from a young age, and told Rolling Stone, "My little boyfriend used to take me to school every day, so I grew up listening to a lot of trap music." Before rapping, Yung Miami was an Instagram influencer who promoted her own fashion line selling clothes and other items.

=== Family ===
Yung Miami is the mother of a son born 2013 and daughter born 2019. Her son's father was fatally shot in 2020. Her daughter's father is record producer Southside.

On August 6, 2019, Yung Miami was the victim of a drive-by shooting after leaving Circle House Studios in Miami. An unknown assailant inside a car with no lights on attempted to fire shots into her vehicle, striking her red Mercedes-Benz G-Class in the spare tire. She was not injured.

=== Legal issues and controversies ===
==== 2018–2020: JT incarceration ====
Shortly after the release of their 2017 debut single, "Fuck Dat Nigga", JT was arrested and convicted of aggravated identity theft on fraudulent credit card charges, and was sentenced to 24 months in federal prison. Following a pushback of her surrender date, JT turned herself in to the authorities on June 29, 2018, and began serving her sentence while being held at FCI Tallahassee in July 2018. She was slated to be released March 21, 2020. As she awaited her release, JT was transferred from FCI Tallahassee to a halfway house in Atlanta on October 8. During her stay in the halfway house, she was able to leave the house during the day to work and visit family and friends. To celebrate her release, JT released a track titled "JT First Day Out". On the song, she shouts out Yung Miami, rapping,

"I been a real bitch way before the fed case / Yung Miami held me down, that's a bitch ace / And if a bitch try her, it's a cold case".

A few celebrities showed to be displeased with the incarceration of the artist : Houston-based rapper Megan Thee Stallion shouted out "Free JT" on her song "Realer", Trina wore a T-shirt that had "Free JT" written on it. JT was officially released from federal custody on March 7, 2020.

==== Yung Miami homophobic remarks ====
In 2013, Yung Miami stated that she would not want one of her sons to be gay and would beat him if she found out that he was. In August 2018, Yung Miami was among several rappers who faced criticism after the circulation of tweets she had written in the past that contained homophobic remarks. Following the resurfacing of her statements, Yung Miami publicly issued a formal apology through an Instagram post.

Though she apologized, Yung Miami found herself embroiled in controversy once more on November 13 when she doubled down on her homophobic statements in an appearance on Power 105.1's radio show The Breakfast Club. During the interview, she was questioned by radio host Charlamagne tha God in regard to her controversial tweet that claimed what she would do if she found out that her son was gay. Yung Miami replied that her previous tweet had nothing to do with the LGBTQ community and was specifically about her son. She said, "I was just talking about my son. I just said that if I saw anything gay in my son, that I would beat him". The rapper attempted to provide clarity for what she had actually meant. She elaborated, "But that's just like when your mama be like, 'If you break my table I'm gonna beat the shit out of you.' That don't mean she's gonna beat the shit out of you, she's just saying it." While she stood by her comment that as a mother she does not want a gay son, Yung Miami insisted that she does not harbor any resentment towards gay people. She explained that she spends much time around many gay people, including her cousin and hairstylist.

Commentators throughout social media immediately decried the rapper, saying that her very line of reasoning was homophobic and the comments she made on The Breakfast Club were hateful and anti-LGBTQ. It was also emphasized that such corporal punishment is still in practice among some parents who condemn their children's sexual orientation.

==== Yung Miami sex worker allegation ====
At the time he amended his sex abuse lawsuit against Sean "Diddy" Combs on March 26, 2024, Rodney "Lil Rod" Jones stated that Yung Miami accepted payment to be a sex worker for Combs.

== Discography ==
- Girl Code (2018)
- City on Lock (2020)
- RAW (2023)

== Awards and nominations ==
List of awards and nominations for City Girls
Award	Year (Note: Indicates the year of ceremony. Each year is linked to the article about the awards held that year, wherever possible.)	Recipient(s) and nominee(s)	Category	Result	Ref.
BET Awards	2019	Themselves	Best New Artist	Nominated	
BET Awards	2019	Themselves	Best Group	Nominated	
BET Awards	2020	Themselves	Best Group	Nominated	
BET Awards	2021	Themselves	Best Group	Nominated	
BET Awards	2022	Themselves	Best Group	Nominated	
BET Awards	2023	Themselves	Best Group	Nominated	
BET Hip Hop Awards	2019	"Twerk" (featuring Cardi B)	Best Hip-Hop Video	Nominated	
BET Hip Hop Awards	2019	"Act Up"	Single of the Year	Nominated	
BET Hip Hop Awards	2020	Themselves	Best Duo/Group	Nominated	
BET Hip Hop Awards	2021	Themselves	Best Duo/Group	Nominated	
BET Hip Hop Awards	2022	"Good Love" (featuring Usher)	Best Hip Hop Video	Nominated	
BET Hip Hop Awards	2022	"Good Love" (featuring Usher)	Best Collaboration	Nominated	
BET Hip Hop Awards	2023	Themselves	Best Duo/Group	Nominated	
BET Social Awards	2019	Themselves	Issa Wave	Won	
Billboard Music Awards	2019	Themselves	Top Rap Female Artist	Nominated	
Billboard Music Awards	2020	Themselves	Top Rap Female Artist	Nominated	
Nickelodeon Kids' Choice Awards	2020	Themselves	Favorite Breakout Artist	Nominated	
Variety's Hitmakers Awards	2021	Themselves	The Future is Female Award	Won	
