= Yung Miami =

American rapper (born 1994)

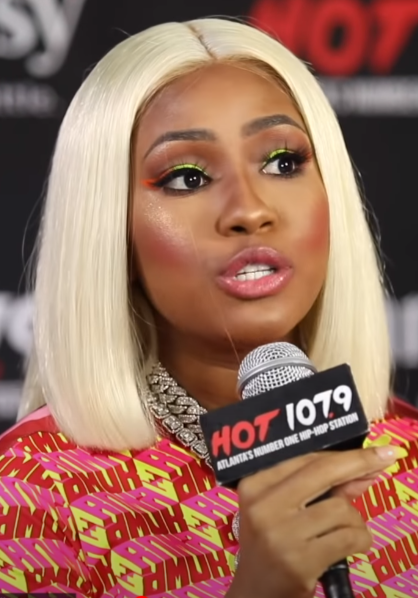
- Yung Miami in 2019

Background information
- Born: Caresha Romeka Brownlee; February 11, 1994 (age 32); Miami, Florida, U.S.
- Genre: Southern hip-hop
- Occupations: Rapper; songwriter
- Years active: 2017–present
- Labels: Uptown; Quality Control (2018—2025); Capitol; Motown
- Formerly of: City Girls
- Partner: Sean Combs (2021–2024)
- Website: careshaplease.com

Caresha Romeka Brownlee (born February 11, 1994), better known by her stage name Yung Miami, is an American rapper. She formed the Miami, Florida-based hip-hop duo City Girls with JT in 2017, and began her solo career in 2021. Released in October of that year, her single "Rap Freaks" marked her first entry on the Billboard Hot 100 as a solo act. She guest performed alongside Latto on the remix of Lola Brooke's 2021 single, "Don't Play with It", which peaked at number 69 on the chart.

== Career ==
Yung Miami was born and raised in Miami, Florida, growing up in Opa-locka. At 22, she was performing in strip clubs, night clubs and block parties. Yung Miami said that she loved trap music from a young age, and told Rolling Stone, "My little boyfriend used to take me to school every day, so I grew up listening to a lot of trap music." Before rapping, Yung Miami was an Instagram influencer who promoted her own fashion line selling clothes and other items. She met JT, where they formed the duo City Girls. The duo recorded their debut studio track, "Fuck Dat Nigga", which was a diss track towards their ex-boyfriends for not giving them money when they asked. In a September 2024 podcast interview, Yung Miami states that she considers herself an entertainer, leveraging "rap" as a segue into the entertainment industry.

=== 2017–2023: With City Girls ===
The City Girls released their debut mixtape, Period, in May 2018. In July 2018, the duo were launched into mainstream recognition after an uncredited feature on Drake's "In My Feelings." In November 2018, the City Girls released their debut album, which included features from Cardi B, Lil Baby and Jacquees. On June 19, 2020, City Girls's second studio album, City on Lock, leaked in its entirety online. JT announced hours later that the album would be released at midnight of the same day. The album's first single, "Jobs", was released hours before the album alongside a music video. City Girls released their last album, RAW (Real Ass Whores) in 2023, and separated soon after.

== Business ventures ==
=== Caresha Please podcast ===
Since Caresha Please debuted in 2022, the podcast episodes have accumulated over 50 million views collectively on YouTube.

==== Season 1 (2022–2023) ====
On June 9, 2022, Yung Miami released the first episode of her podcast Caresha Please on Revolt TV and multiple media streaming platforms. Since then, she has interviewed a number of celebrities and musicians, such as Megan Thee Stallion, Summer Walker, Kevin Gates, Trina and more. In 2022, "Caresha Please" and another Revolt show called "Drink Champs" tied for the award of "Best Hip Hop Platform" at the 2022 BET Hip Hop Awards. This decision upset many critics, with some feeling that her win was undeserved, given that at the time she had only released five episodes.

On October 10, 2023, Yung Miami won the "Best Hip Hop Platform" award at 2023 BET Hip Hop Awards, defeating the other platforms in her category, such as "Million Dollarz Worth of Game", "The Joe Budden Podcast" and "Drink Champs". The win was criticized as being undeserved. Whilst on The Breakfast Club, Charlamagne tha God shared his thoughts on the win, questioning if it was "sponsored by Deleon", implying that the awards may have been fixed by Diddy. Yung Miami appeared as a guest on The Breakfast Club on October 26, 2023, where both her and Charlamagne discussed the comments that he made. Yung Miami defended her win saying "Don't discredit me. I work hard. [...] I deserve everything that's coming to me."

Caresha Please Season One – List of episodes
No.	Host(s)	Title	Release date	Guest(s)
1	Yung Miami	Kevin Gates	July 14, 2022	Kevin Gates
Kevin Gates on his sexual fantasies, semen retention and religion
2	Yung Miami, Saucy Santana	JT	August 11, 2022	JT
JT and Saucy Santana on fame, love and prison
3	Yung Miami	Megan Thee Stallion	August 25, 2022	Megan Thee Stallion
Megan Thee Stallion on "P-Valley," bisexuality, and 'Traumazine'
4	Yung Miami	Saweetie	September 8, 2022	Saweetie
Saweetie on her rise to fame, Quavo breakup, and cheating
5	Yung Miami, Saucy Santana	Latto	September 22, 2022	Latto
Latto on "being freaky," her relationship status, and Mariah Carey
6	Yung Miami	G Herbo	December 22, 2022	G Herbo
G Herbo on being a City Boy, past trauma, and cheating
7	Yung Miami	Trina	January 19, 2023	Trina
Trina on the rap game, her love life, and being from Miami
8	Yung Miami	Blac Chyna	May 18, 2023	Blac Chyna
Blac Chyna talks turn-ons, Tokyo Toni, Tyga & more
9	Yung Miami	Summer Walker	May 25, 2023	Summer Walker
Summer Walker on dating Lil Meech, her ex London on da Track, stage anxiety and more
10	Yung Miami	Ariana Fletcher	October 12, 2023	Ariana Fletcher
Ari Fletcher talks G Herbo, Moneybagg Yo, baby mamas and more

==== Season 2 (2024) ====
On August 8, 2024, Yung Miami released the first episode of the second season of Caresha Please. In this episode, she had Saucy Santana, her best friend and occasional co-host, interview her. During the interview, she addressed her relationship with Sean (Diddy) Combs, announced their break-up, and also addressed her relationship with group member JT, stating that things between them are "not all good, but it's not all bad". In the interview, Yung Miami also discussed how both situations took a toll on her mental health, and revealed that she is a two-time domestic abuse survivor, though she was not a victim of Combs. This first episode of Caresha Please, garnered over a million views within the first day of its release. In season 2, she interviewed celebrities and artists such as rapper Flo Milli, singer Mariah the Scientist, and rapper and business mogul Rick Ross.

Caresha Please Season Two – List of episodes
No.	Host(s)	Title	Release date	Guest(s)
1	Saucy Santana	'Caresha Speaks'	August 8, 2024	Yung Miami
Yung Miami breaks her silence on Diddy, her mental health and City Girls
2	Yung Miami	Rick Ross	September 12, 2024	Rick Ross
Rick Ross reveals all about his ex Tia Kemp, Drake's BBL rumors, boss moves & more
3	Yung Miami	Tia Kemp	September 26, 2024	Tia Kemp
Tia Kemp talks Rick Ross drama, his beef with Drake, and BossMan Dlow
4	Yung Miami	Boosie Badazz	October 10, 2024	Boosie Badazz
Boosie Badazz talks his family, mental health, rap and cancel culture
5	Yung Miami	Mariah the Scientist	October 24, 2024	Mariah the Scientist
Mariah the Scientist talks suicidal thoughts, dating rappers and the music industry
6	Yung Miami	NLE Choppa	November 14, 2024	NLE Choppa
NLE Choppa on his sexuality, music, fatherhood and more
7	Yung Miami	Antonio Brown	November 21, 2024	Antonio Brown
Antonio Brown talks NFL superstardom, dating Keyshia Cole and supporting Donald Trump
8	Yung Miami	Flo Milli	December 5, 2024	Flo Milli
Superstar Flo Milli talks blowing up during the pandemic, new music, relationship status & more

=== Caresha Please: The brand ===
In addition to the podcast, Yung Miami also developed Caresha Please into a brand name, under which she sells apparel, such as shirts, onesies, and shorts, as well as accessories such as socks, hats and miscellaneous products like greetings cards and wrapping paper. She has also previously hinted at releasing bathrobes as well as candles .

=== Resha Roulette ===
In late 2022, Yung Miami announced the release of her drinking game "Resha Roulette", a card game for players 21+, consisting of 120 cards and 4 shot glasses. Since its release, she has promoted the game by playing it several times on her podcast with her celebrity guests. Other podcasters and YouTubers have played the game as part of their content also. The card game was seen on an episode of Basketball Wives aired in September 2024. Since the release of 'Resha Roulette', Yung Miami has generated over $1 million from the card game and it reached #1 on Amazon in the Drinking Games category. In addition to the card game, she has also previously hosted live events that allow the public to purchase tickets and play the game alongside her in person.

==== Resha Roulette: Reloaded ====
On February 14, 2025, Yung Miami released "Resha Roulette: Reloaded", a new version of her card game, this time consisting of new humorous cards, play money and a spinner wheel. "Resha Roulette: Reloaded" sold out within the first three days of its launch.

=== Summer Miami Cosmetics ===
In October 2023, Yung Miami launched Summer Miami Cosmetics, a cosmetics line inspired by and named after her daughter. The line was launched to coincide with her daughter's sixth birthday.

=== Resha Roulette: Reloaded – The Tour ===
On March 5, 2025, Yung Miami announced that she would be going on a game night tour across the United States. The tour originally began with 12 cities, but due to increased demand more stops were added. The tour featured a mix of music and an interactive gaming experience.

== Personal life ==
Yung Miami is the mother of a son, named Jai, born in 2013 and a daughter, named Summer, born in 2019. Her son's father, Jai Wiggins, was fatally shot in 2020. Her daughter's father is record producer Southside, whom Yung Miami dated for two years prior to their separation. She was in a relationship with rapper Sean Combs from 2022 to 2023. In an addition to a February 2024 lawsuit filed against Combs by his producer Rodney Jones Jr., also known as Lil Rod, Yung Miami was accused of transporting "pink cocaine", a combination of various banned drugs dyed pink, on a private jet to bring to Combs in April 2023. Lil Rod also alleged that Yung Miami accepted payments as a prostitute for Combs. Another lawsuit filed by a Jane Doe against Combs in September 2024 alleged that he drugged, raped, and impregnated her and that Yung Miami harassed her by making repeated calls to her, demanding that she get an abortion.

In May 2023, Yung Miami publicly confirmed in an interview she is bisexual but has no desires to be in a long-term romantic relationship with a woman.

In April 2025, Yung Miami denied rumors that she was romantically pursuing NFL player Shedeur Sanders, who is the son of football coach and former player Deion Sanders. She had previously turned down romantic advances from 50 Cent, DaBaby and actor Michael B. Jordan.

=== Homophobic remarks ===
In 2013, Yung Miami stated that she would not want one of her sons to be gay and would beat him if she found out that he was. In August 2018, Yung Miami was among several rappers who faced criticism after the circulation of tweets she had written in the past that contained homophobic remarks. Following the resurfacing of her statements, Yung Miami publicly issued a formal apology through an Instagram post.

Though she apologized, Yung Miami found herself embroiled in controversy once more on November 13 when she doubled down on her homophobic statements in an appearance on Power 105.1's radio show The Breakfast Club. During the interview, she was questioned by radio host Charlamagne tha God in regard to her controversial tweet that claimed what she would do if she found out that her son was gay. Yung Miami replied that her previous tweet had nothing to do with the LGBTQ community and was specifically about her son. She said, "I was just talking about my son. I just said that if I saw anything gay in my son, that I would beat him". Miami insisted that she does not harbor any resentment towards gay people as she spends much time around them, including her cousin and stylist.

== Discography ==
=== Studio albums ===
List of studio albums, with details
Title	Details	Peak chart positions	
Title	Details	US	US R&B/HH
Watch Dis!	Released: October 23, 2026; Label: Uptown, Republic; Format: Digital download, streaming	138	47

=== Singles ===
==== As lead artist ====
List of singles showing year released and album name
Title	Year	Peak chart positions					Certifications	Album
Title	Year	US	US R&B /HH	CAN	NZ Hot	WW	Certifications	Album
"Periodt" (with City Baby)	2019	—	—	—	—	—		Non-album singles
"Haterade" (featuring Big Drako)	2019	—	—	—	—	—		Non-album singles
"Rap Freaks"	2021	81	30	—	—	—		Non-album singles
"50/50"	2024	—	—	—	—	—		Non-album singles
"CFWM" (with Skilla Baby)	2024	—	—	—	—	—		Non-album singles
"Ima Hoe Too" (with DaBaby)	2025	—	—	—	—	—		Non-album singles
"News Flash"	2026	—	—	—	—	—		Non-album singles
"Tea Time"	2026	—	—	—	—	—		Non-album singles
"Spend Dat"	2026	17	4	96	14	186	RIAA: Platinum	Watch Dis!
"F You"	2026	—	—	—	—	—		Watch Dis!
"2008"	2026	—	—	—	31	—		Watch Dis!
"—" denotes a recording that did not chart or was not released in that territory.

==== As featured artist ====
List of singles as featured artist, with selected chart positions, showing year released and album name
Title	Year	Peak chart positions		Album
Title	Year	US	US R&B /HH	Album
"Strub tha Ground" (Quavo featuring Yung Miami)	2021	— (Note: "Strub tha Ground" did not enter the Billboard Hot 100, but peaked at number 13 on the Bubbling Under Hot 100 chart.)	—	Non-album single
"Don't Play with It (Remix)" (Lola Brooke featuring Yung Miami and Latto)	2023	69	21	Dennis Daughter
"—" denotes a recording that did not chart or was not released in that territory.

=== Guest appearances ===
List of non-single guest appearances, with other performing artists, showing year released and album name
Title	Year	Other artist(s)	Album
"Gotta Move On (Queens Remix)"	2022	Diddy, Bryson Tiller, Ashanti	Non-album remix
"Dade County Dreaming"	2024	Camila Cabello, JT	C,XOXO
"Haoyu Dewdat"	2026	Quavo	Qrömelife

== Filmography ==
=== Television ===
List of Yung Miami television credits
Year	Title	Role	Notes
2021	Respectfully Justin	Herself	
2022	Rap Sh!t	Co-executive Producer	
2023	Grown-ish	"Ms. It"	Episode: 'Cleaning Out My Closet' (Season 5)
2023	BMF	"Deanna"	Episode: 'High Treason' (Season 2)
2023	The Jason Lee Show	Herself	S1 E13: Yung Miami
2023	RapCaviar Presents	Herself	S1, E2: City Girls: Money, Power & Respect
2023	The Wine Down	Herself	S1 E1: Sex, Love and Situationships
2025	Baddies Africa Auditions	Herself	Judge

=== Film ===
Year	Title	Role	Notes
2023	You People	Tiffany	
