= JT (rapper) =

American rapper (born 1992)

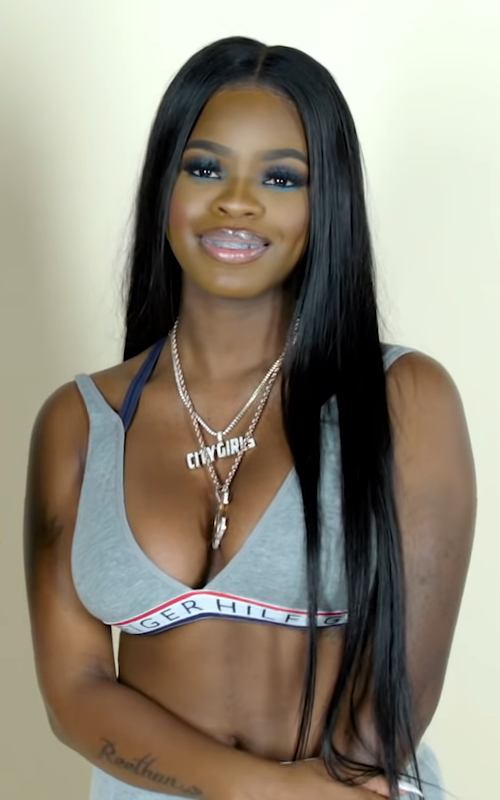
- JT in 2018

Background information
- Also known as: City Cinderella
- Born: Jatavia Shakara Johnson; December 3, 1992 (age 33); Miami, Florida, U.S.
- Genre: Southern hip-hop
- Occupations: Rapper; songwriter
- Years active: 2017–present
- Labels: Quality Control; Universal; Motown; Capitol (2018—2020)
- Formerly of: City Girls
- Partner: Lil Uzi Vert (2019–present)
- Website: thegirljtworld.com

Jatavia Shakara Johnson (born December 3, 1992), better known by her stage name JT, is an American rapper. She formed the Miami-based hip-hop duo City Girls with Yung Miami in 2017, and began her solo career in 2023. She co-performed on Summer Walker's 2021 single "Ex for a Reason", which peaked within the top 40 of the Billboard Hot 100 and marked her first entry on the chart as a solo act. Her 2024 single, "Okay", peaked at number 72 on the chart and preceded her debut solo mixtape, City Cinderella (2024).

== Early life ==
Jatavia Shakara Johnson was born and raised in Miami, Florida, growing up in Carol City and Liberty City. Johnson has 18 siblings. She moved in with her father at age 5 after her mother was incarcerated. She stated that "my mother was an addict" and that "drugs ruined my childhood." While growing up, she formed a rap group with her siblings, called The Protegees. During her teenage years, she alternated between living with her aunt and Caresha Brownlee, who she befriended in middle school. She began to occasionally post freestyle rap videos on social media. In August 2017, she formed City Girls with Brownlee and released their debut studio track, "Fuck Dat Nigga", a diss track towards their ex-boyfriends. The song was posted on SoundCloud and went viral, leading them to sign with Quality Control Music in December 2017. She briefly attended college for a degree in fashion merchandising and design.

== Career ==
=== 2017–2023: With City Girls ===
The City Girls released their debut mixtape, Period, in May 2018. In July 2018, the duo were launched into mainstream recognition after an uncredited feature on Drake's "In My Feelings." In November 2018, the City Girls released their debut album, which included features from Cardi B, Lil Baby and Jacquees. She released her first solo single, "JT First Day Out" in 2019. On June 19, 2020, City Girls' second studio album, City on Lock, leaked in its entirety online. It was officially released the following day. The album's first single, "Jobs", was released hours before the album alongside a music video. The album includes guest appearances from Yo Gotti, Doja Cat, Lil Durk and Lil Baby. Their third studio album, RAW, was released in October 2023.

=== 2023–present: Solo career ===
JT's debut single as a solo artist, "No Bars", was released on July 14, 2023. It reached #25 on the Billboard Bubbling Under Hot 100 chart. In February 2024, JT released her single "Sideways".

JT also featured as a solo artist on records including Summer Walker's "Ex for a Reason" (2021), the "Queen Mix" of Nicki Minaj's "Super Freaky Girl" (2022), and Kali Uchis' "Muñekita" (2023).

On March 9, 2024, JT announced her 14-show solo tour, starting on March 23 in Houston, Texas, and ending April 27 in Kansas City, Missouri.

On March 24, 2024, JT announced her debut solo mixtape, City Cinderella. On March 29, 2024, JT and Doechii released their collaboration single "Alter Ego". JT teased a snippet of her single "Okay" as a part of her tour, which later went viral on social media. "Okay" was released on April 26. On May 7, 2024, "Okay" charted on the Billboard Hot 100 at #74, marking JT's first ever solo charting record. An extended version with an extra verse was released three days later to celebrate this and further generate anticipation for City Cinderella. On June 28, 2024, JT released a remix of "Okay" featuring a verse from rapper Jeezy. City Cinderella was released on July 19, 2024.

The rapper would later release "Girls Gone Wild" on November 7, 2025. The next year on April 17, she released the single "Numb".

She voiced the character DJ JT, a radio host of Vice City Rap Radio, in the 2026 video game Grand Theft Auto VI. She also contributed the song "GMA" to the game's soundtrack.

== Personal life ==
JT has been dating rapper Lil Uzi Vert since 2019. Her younger brother died in December 2024.

She is an active supporter of the LGBTQ community.

In 2023, JT launched the merchandising retailer and lifestyle brand, thegirljtworld.

=== Legal issues ===
Shortly after the release of the 2017 debut single, "Fuck Dat Nigga", JT was arrested and convicted of aggravated identity theft on fraudulent credit card charges, and was sentenced to two years in federal prison. Following a pushback of her surrender date, JT turned herself in to the authorities on June 29, 2018, and began serving her sentence at FCI Tallahassee in July 2018. She was slated to be released March 21, 2020. As she awaited her release, JT was transferred from FCI Tallahassee to a halfway house in Atlanta on October 8, 2019. To celebrate her transfer, JT released a track titled "JT First Day Out". During her stay in the halfway house, she was able to leave during the day to work and visit family and friends. JT was released from federal custody on March 7, 2020.

== Discography ==
=== Mixtapes ===
List of mixtapes, with selected chart positions
Title	Mixtape details	Peak chart positions		
Title	Mixtape details	US	US R&B /HH	US Rap
City Cinderella	Released: July 19, 2024; Label: Quality Control, Motown, Universal; Format: CD, LP, Digital download, streaming	27	5	3

=== Singles ===
List of singles, with selected chart positions, showing year released and album name
Title	Year	Peak chart positions						Certifications	Album
Title	Year	US	US R&B/HH	CAN	NZ Hot	UK	WW	Certifications	Album
"JT First Day Out" (with City Girls)	2019	—	—	—	—	—	—		Non-album single
"Ex for a Reason" (with Summer Walker)	2021	33	12	75	18	42	51	RIAA: Gold; RMNZ: Gold	Still Over It
"No Bars" (with City Girls)	2023	— (Note: "No Bars" did not enter the Billboard Hot 100, but peaked at number 25 on the Bubbling Under Hot 100 chart.)	38	—	—	—	—		RAW
"Muñekita" (with Kali Uchis and El Alfa)	2023	—	—	—	39	—	—		Orquídeas
"Alter Ego" (with Doechii)	2024	—	—	—	—	—	—	ARIA: Gold; BPI: Silver	Non-album single
"Sideways"	2024	— (Note: "Sideways" did not enter the Billboard Hot 100, but peaked at number 7 on the Bubbling Under Hot 100 chart.)	43	—	—	—	—	RIAA: Gold	City Cinderella
"Okay" (solo or remix with Jeezy)	2024	72	22	—	38	— (Note: "Okay" did not enter the UK Singles Chart, but peaked at number 90 on the UK Singles Downloads Chart.)	—	RIAA: Platinum	City Cinderella
"Ran Out"	2025	—	—	—	—	—	—		TBA
"Girls Gone Wild"	2025	—	—	—	—	—	—		TBA
"Numb"	2026	—	—	—	—	—	—		TBA
"Freak" (with Yseult)	2026	—	—	—	—	—	—		FREAK
"—" denotes a recording that did not chart or was not released in that territory.

=== Guest appearances ===
List of guest appearances, with other performing artists, showing year released and album name
Title	Year	Other artist(s)	Album
"F.N.F. (Let's Go)" (Remix)	2022	Hitkidd, GloRilla, Latto	Renegade
"Super Freaky Girl" (Queen Mix)	2022	Nicki Minaj, Bia, Katie Got Bandz, Akbar V, Maliibu Miitch	Queen Radio: Volume 1
"Like Dat" (Remix)	2023	Stunna Girl	Non-album singles
"Alter Ego"	2024	Doechii	Non-album singles
"Dade County Dreaming"	2024	Camila Cabello, Yung Miami	C,XOXO
"Chanel Bag"	2024	Gucci Mane	Greatest of All Trappers (Gangsta Grillz Edition)
"Into Your Garden"	2024	070 Shake	Petrichor
"Noises"	2025	PinkPantheress	Fancy Some More?
"Slime Is Bestie"	2025	Shygirl, Sega Bodega	Alias Is Me
"Pretty Ugly" (Girls Trip)	2026	Zara Larsson, Margo XS	Midnight Sun: Girls Trip
"Game On"	2026	Little Simz	Sugar Girl
"Freak" (remix)	2026	Yseult	FREAK

== Tours ==
Headlining

- City Cinderella Tour (2024)

== Accolades ==
List of awards and nominations
Award	Year (Note: Indicates the year of ceremony. Each year is linked to the article about the awards held that year, wherever possible.)	Recipient(s) and nominee(s)	Category	Result	Ref.
Premios Juventud	2024	"Muñekita" (with Kali Uchis & El Alfa)	OMG Collaboration	Nominated	
BET Awards	2025	"Alter Ego" (with Doechii)	Best Collaboration	Nominated	
