= A Boogie wit da Hoodie discography =

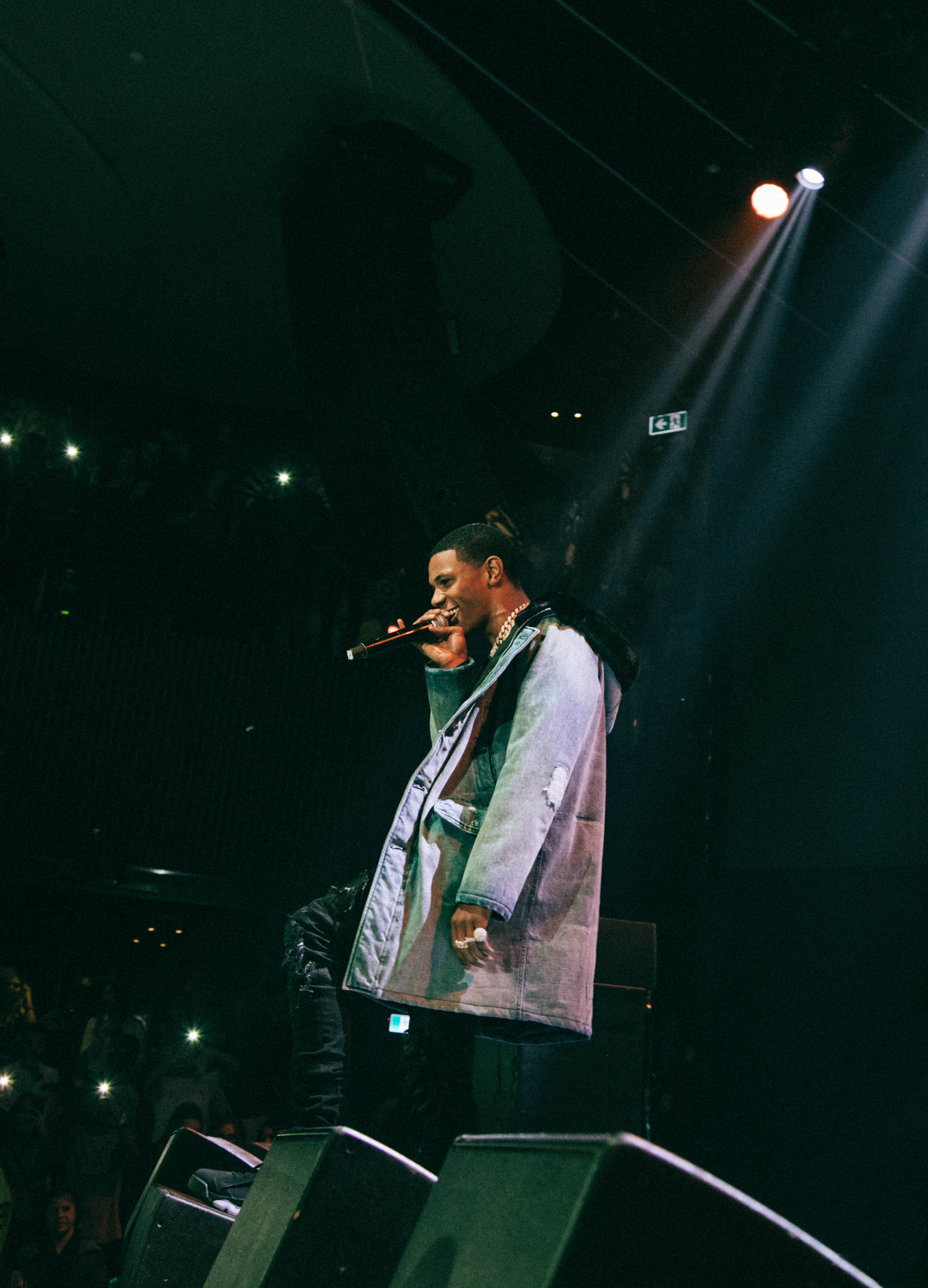
- Studio albums: 5
- EPs: 4
- Singles: 49
- Music videos: 34
- Mixtapes: 2

American singer A Boogie wit da Hoodie has released five studio albums, two mixtapes, 33 music videos, five extended plays (EPs) and 49 singles (including twenty-three as a featured artist).

== Albums ==
=== Studio albums ===
List of studio albums, with selected chart positions, sales figures and certifications
Title	Details	Peak chart positions									Certifications
Title	Details	US	US R&B/HH	US Rap	AUS	CAN	NL	NZ	NOR	UK	Certifications
The Bigger Artist	Released: September 29, 2017; Label: Highbridge, Atlantic; Format: Digital download, streaming	4	1	1	—	10	—	—	—	—	RIAA: 2× Platinum; MC: Platinum
Hoodie SZN	Released: December 21, 2018; Label: Highbridge, Atlantic; Format: Digital download, streaming	1	1	1	23	1	24	31	25	23	RIAA: 2× Platinum; BPI: Gold; MC: 3× Platinum
Artist 2.0	Released: February 14, 2020; Label: Highbridge, Atlantic; Format: Digital download, streaming	2	2	1	39	4	10	24	14	11	RIAA: Platinum; BPI: Gold; MC: Platinum
Me vs. Myself	Released: December 9, 2022; Label: Highbridge, Atlantic; Format: Digital download, streaming	6	4	3	60	6	37	—	38	22	MC: Gold
Better Off Alone	Released: May 17, 2024; Label: Highbridge, Atlantic; Formats: Digital download, streaming	18	5	4	53	42	65	—	—	72	

== Mixtapes ==
List of mixtapes, showing selected details
Title	Details	Peak chart positions			Certifications
Title	Details	US	US R&B/HH	US Rap	Certifications
Artist	Released: February 14, 2016; Label: Highbridge, Atlantic; Format: Digital download, streaming	70	31	22	RIAA: Platinum
Highbridge The Label: The Takeover Vol. 1 (with Don Q)	Released: May 18, 2016; Label: Highbridge; Format: Self-Released	—	—	—	
"—" denotes a recording that did not chart or was not released in that territory.

== EPs ==
List of extended plays, showing selected details
Title	Details	Peak chart positions			
Title	Details	US	US R&B/HH	US Rap	CAN
TBA	Released: October 28, 2016; Label: Highbridge, Atlantic; Format: Digital Download	63	6	6	—
International Artist	Released: June 20, 2018; Label: Highbridge, Atlantic; Format: Digital download, streaming	57	32	—	56
B4 HOODIESZN	Released: September 22, 2018; Label: Self-released; Format: Digital download, streaming	—	—	—	—
B4 AVA	Released: December 10, 2021; Label: Highbridge, Atlantic; Format: Digital download, streaming	26	12	6	24
B4 BOA	Released: September 8, 2023; Label: Highbridge, Atlantic; Format: Digital download, streaming	—	—	—	—
Before Artistry	Released: February 13, 2026; Label: Highbridge, Atlantic, Warner; Format: Digital download, streaming	—	—	—	—

== Singles ==
=== As lead artist ===
List of singles as lead artist, with selected chart positions, showing year released and album name
Title	Year	Peak chart positions										Certifications	Album
Title	Year	US	US R&B/HH	US Rap	AUS	CAN	NL	NZ Hot	SWE	SWI	UK	Certifications	Album
"Not a Regular Person"	2016	—	—	—	—	—	—	—	—	—	—	RIAA: Platinum	Highbridge the Label: The Takeover Vol. 1
"Bando" (with Don Q)	2016	—	—	—	—	—	—	—	—	—	—		Highbridge the Label: The Takeover Vol. 1
"My Shit"	2016	86	35	22	—	—	—	—	—	—	—	RIAA: 4× Platinum; BPI: Gold; MC: 3× Platinum	Artist
"Jungle"	2016	107	46	—	—	—	—	—	—	—	—	RIAA: 5× Platinum; BPI: Platinum; MC: 3× Platinum	Artist
"Timeless" (featuring DJ SpinKing)	2016	86	36	—	—	—	—	—	—	—	—	RIAA: Platinum; MC: Platinum	TBA
"Proud of Me Now" (featuring Lil Bibby)	2016	—	—	—	—	—	—	—	—	—	—		Non-album single
"Bag on Me" (with Don Q)	2016	—	—	—	—	—	—	—	—	—	—		Highbridge the Label: The Takeover Vol.1
"Drowning" (featuring Kodak Black)	2017	38	15	11	—	53	—	—	—	—	—	RIAA: Diamond; BPI: Gold; MC: 8× Platinum; AFP: Platinum	The Bigger Artist
"Horses" (with PnB Rock and Kodak Black)	2017	109	53	—	—	—	—	—	—	—	—	RIAA: 2× Platinum	The Fate of the Furious: The Album
"Beast Mode" (featuring PnB Rock and YoungBoy Never Broke Again)	2017	86	38	—	—	—	—	—	—	—	—	RIAA: Platinum; MC: Platinum	The Bigger Artist
"Say A'"	2017	75	33	—	—	—	—	—	—	—	—	RIAA: 2× Platinum; MC: Platinum	The Bigger Artist
"Keke" (with 6ix9ine and Fetty Wap)	2018	43	22	20	—	—	—	—	—	—	—	RIAA: Gold; MC: Gold	Day69
"Nonchalant" (featuring Alkaline)	2018	—	—	—	—	—	—	—	—	—	—		International Artist
"Best Friend" (featuring Tory Lanez)	2018	—	—	—	—	—	—	—	—	—	—		International Artist
"Way Too Fly" (featuring Davido)	2018	—	—	—	—	—	—	—	—	—	—		International Artist
"Odee"	2018	—	—	—	—	—	—	—	—	—	—	RIAA: Gold	Hoodie SZN & International Artist
"Right Moves"	2018	—	—	—	—	—	—	—	—	—	—		Non-album single
"Look Back at It"	2018	27	12	10	41	23	88	22	76	50	51	RIAA: 7× Platinum; ARIA: Platinum; BPI: Platinum; MC: 7× Platinum; IFPI DEN: Platinum; SNEP: Gold; BVMI: Gold; AFP: Platinum	Hoodie SZN
"Look Back at It" (with Olexesh or Park Woo-jin)	2019	—	—	—	—	—	—	—	—	—	—		Non-album single
"Swervin" (featuring 6ix9ine)	2019	38	16	13	41	24	—	21	83	95	27	RIAA: 6× Platinum; ARIA: Platinum; BPI: Platinum; MC: 8× Platinum; IFPI DEN: Platinum; AFP: Platinum	Hoodie SZN
"Swervin" (featuring Veysel)	2019	—	—	—	—	—	—	—	—	—	—	RIAA: 6× Platinum; BVMI: Gold	Non-album single
"Mood Swings"	2019	76	32	—	—	61	—	30	—	—	—	RIAA: Platinum; MC: Platinum	Artist 2.0
"Somebody" (with Internet Money and Lil Tecca)	2019	96	44	—	—	54	—	16	—	—	75	RIAA: Platinum; MC: Platinum	B4 the Storm
"Reply" (featuring Lil Uzi Vert)	2019	49	22	17	—	54	—	23	—	—	—	RIAA: Platinum; MC: Gold	Artist 2.0
"King of My City"	2020	69	32	24	—	71	—	24	—	—	—	RIAA: Gold; MC: Gold	Artist 2.0
"Numbers" (featuring Roddy Ricch, Gunna and London on da Track)	2020	23	12	7	—	32	—	16	—	—	53	RIAA: Platinum; MC: Platinum	Artist 2.0
"Bleed"	2020	57	25	20	—	55	—	22	—	—	82	RIAA: Gold; MC: Gold	Artist 2.0
"Flood My Wrist" (featuring Don Q and Lil Uzi Vert)	2020	109	—	—	—	—	—	28	—	—	—		Highbridge the Label: Vol. 2
"9 Bridge" (with Rowdy Rebel)	2021	—	—	—	—	—	—	—	—	—	—		Non-album single
"24 Hours" (featuring Lil Durk)	2021	92	38	—	—	75	—	25	—	—	—	RIAA: Platinum; BPI: Silver; MC: Platinum	B4 AVA & Me vs. Myself
"Non Judgemental"	2022	—	—	—	—	—	—	—	—	—	—		Non-album singles
"Hit Different" (featuring B-Lovee)	2022	—	—	—	—	—	—	—	—	—	—		Non-album singles
"Playa" (featuring Ella Bands or H.E.R)	2022	111	50	—	—	—	—	—	—	—	—		Me vs. Myself
"Take Shots" (featuring Tory Lanez)	2022	123	—	—	—	—	—	24	—	—	—		Me vs. Myself
"B.R.O. (Better Ride Out)" (featuring Roddy Ricch)	2022	113	41	—	—	82	—	25	—	—	—		Me vs. Myself
"Ballin"	2022	—	—	—	—	—	—	—	—	—	—		Me vs. Myself
"Water (Drowning Pt. 2)" (featuring Kodak Black)	2022	97	43	16	—	73	—	20	—	—	—	MC: Gold	Me vs. Myself
"No 808's" (featuring Vory)	2023	—	—	—	—	—	—	—	—	—	—		Non-album singles
"MVP" (featuring G-Eazy or Myke Towers)	2023	—	—	—	—	—	—	28	—	—	—		Non-album singles
"Did Me Wrong"	2023	122	43	—	—	—	—	—	—	—	—		B4 BOA
"Steppas"	2024	—	—	—	—	—	—	27	—	—	—		Better Off Alone
"Part of Me"	2025	66	12	7	—	52	—	11	—	—	57		TBA
"Last Drink"	2025	—	31	25	—	—	—	—	—	—	—		TBA
"—" denotes a recording that did not chart or was not released in that territory.

=== As featured artist ===
List of singles as a featured artist, with selected chart positions, showing year released, certifications and album name
Title	Year	Peak chart positions						Certifications	Album
Title	Year	US	US R&B/HH	US Rap	CAN	FRA	SWE	Certifications	Album
"Playa No More" (PnB Rock featuring A Boogie wit da Hoodie and Quavo)	2016	—	—	—	—	—	—		GTTM: Goin Thru the Motions
"Pills & Automobiles" (Chris Brown featuring Yo Gotti, A Boogie wit da Hoodie and Kodak Black)	2017	46	17	13	67	136	—	RIAA: 3× Platinum	Heartbreak on a Full Moon
"Company" (Remy Ma featuring A Boogie wit da Hoodie)	2018	—	—	—	—	—	—		Non-album singles
"When I Call Em" (Ebenezer featuring A Boogie wit da Hoodie)	2018	—	—	—	—	—	—		Non-album singles
"HML" (Melii featuring A Boogie wit da Hoodie)	2019	—	—	—	—	—	—		Phases
"Lips Don't Lie" (Ally Brooke featuring A Boogie wit da Hoodie)	2019	—	—	—	—	—	—		Non-album singles
"Big Rich Town" (Power Remix) (50 Cent featuring Trey Songz and A Boogie wit da Hoodie)	2019	—	—	—	—	—	—		Non-album singles
"Right Back" (Khalid featuring A Boogie wit da Hoodie)	2019	73	29	—	58	—	—	RIAA: Platinum	Free Spirit
"SZNS" (Dinah Jane featuring A Boogie wit da Hoodie)	2019	—	—	—	—	—	—		Non-album single
"Ouh Mädchen" (Olexesh featuring A Boogie wit da Hoodie)	2019	—	—	—	—	—	—		Augen Husky
"Ooh Girl" (Kris Kross Amsterdam and Conor Maynard featuring A Boogie wit da Hoodie)	2019	—	—	—	—	—	—		Non-album single
"Stack It Up" (Liam Payne featuring A Boogie wit da Hoodie)	2019	—	—	—	—	—	—	MC: Gold	LP1
"Stretch You Out" (Summer Walker featuring A Boogie wit da Hoodie)	2019	68	36	—	—	—	—	MC: Gold	Over It
"Party" (Paulo Londra featuring A Boogie wit da Hoodie)	2019	—	—	—	—	—	—		Non-album single
"Tip Toe" (Roddy Ricch featuring A Boogie wit da Hoodie)	2019	73	32	24	71	—	—	RIAA: Platinum; MC: Gold	Please Excuse Me for Being Antisocial
"Bad Vibe" (Quando Rondo featuring A Boogie wit da Hoodie and 2 Chainz)	2020	—	—	—	—	—	—		QPac
"Glass in the Face" (G Herbo featuring A Boogie wit da Hoodie)	2020	117	—	—	—	—	—		PTSD
"Drop" (DaBaby featuring A Boogie wit da Hoodie and London on da Track)	2020	71	32	—	—	—	—		Blame It on Baby
"Lie For You" (Snakehips and Jess Glynne featuring Davido and A Boogie wit da Hoodie)	2020	—	—	—	—	—	—		Non-album single
"Thank God" (Dave East featuring A Boogie wit da Hoodie)	2020	—	—	—	—	—	—		Karma 3
"Hello" (Pop Smoke featuring A Boogie wit da Hoodie)	2021	83	32	24	31	—	53	RIAA: Platinum; ARIA: Gold; MC: 4× Platinum; SNEP: Gold	Shoot for the Stars, Aim for the Moon
"Track Star (Remix)" (Mooski featuring A Boogie wit da Hoodie, Chris Brown and Yung Bleu)	2021	—	—	—	—	—	—		Non-album singles
"Family" (David Guetta featuring Bebe Rexha, Ty Dolla Sign and A Boogie wit da Hoodie)	2021	—	—	—	—	—	78		Non-album singles
"Already Know" (Young Pooda featuring Angelica Vila and A Boogie wit da Hoodie)	2023	—	—	—	—	—	—		Non-album singles
"Chills (LA Hills)" (Tiësto featuring A Boogie wit da Hoodie)	2023	—	—	—	—	—	—		Drive
"Calling" (Metro Boomin, Swae Lee, and Nav featuring A Boogie wit da Hoodie)	2023	41	13	8	18	189	—	ARIA: Gold	Spider-Man: Across the Spider-Verse (Soundtrack from and Inspired by the Motion Picture)
"—" denotes a recording that did not chart or was not released.

== Other charted and certified songs ==
List of other charted songs, with selected chart positions and certifications, showing year released and album name
Title	Year	Peak chart positions								Certifications	Album
Title	Year	US	US R&B/HH	AUS	CAN	NL	NZ Hot	SWE	UK	Certifications	Album
"Still Think About You"	2016	—	60	—	—	—	—	—	—	RIAA: 5× Platinum	Artist
"Friend Zone"	2016	—	—	—	—	—	—	—	—	RIAA: Platinum	Artist
"Reminiscing" (Kodak Black featuring A Boogie wit da Hoodie)	2017	—	57	—	—	—	—	—	—		Painting Pictures
"No Promises"	2017	74	32	—	—	—	—	—	—	RIAA: Platinum; MC: Gold	The Bigger Artist
"Undefeated" (featuring 21 Savage)	2017	84	37	—	—	—	—	—	—	RIAA: Gold; MC: Gold	The Bigger Artist
"No Comparison"	2017	105	46	—	—	—	—	—	—	RIAA: Gold	The Bigger Artist
"Unhappy"	2017	120	56	—	—	—	—	—	—	RIAA: Gold	The Bigger Artist
"Fucking & Kissing" (featuring Chris Brown)	2017	—	60	—	—	—	—	—	—	RIAA: Gold	The Bigger Artist
"Lovin'" (PnB Rock featuring A Boogie wit da Hoodie)	2017	116	53	—	—	—	—	—	—		Catch These Vibes
"Waka" (6ix9ine featuring A Boogie wit da Hoodie)	2018	51	22	—	21	100	13	61	—		Dummy Boy
"Pull Up" (featuring Nav)	2018	—	—	—	—	—	—	—	—	RIAA: Gold	International Artist and Hoodie SZN
"Voices in My Head"	2018	—	60	—	—	—	—	—	—	RIAA: Gold	Hoodie SZN
"Beasty"	2018	—	59	—	—	—	—	—	—		Hoodie SZN
"Startender" (featuring Offset and Tyga)	2018	59	21	—	46	—	16	—	84	RIAA: 2× Platinum; MC: 2× Platinum	Hoodie SZN
"Demons and Angels" (featuring Juice Wrld)	2018	90	37	—	86	—	19	—	—	RIAA: 2× Platinum; BPI: Silver; MC: Platinum	Hoodie SZN
"Love Drugs and Sex"	2018	112	51	—	—	—	—	—	—	RIAA: Gold; MC: Platinum	Hoodie SZN
"Skeezers"	2018	—	58	—	—	—	—	—	—	MC: Platinum	Hoodie SZN
"Come Closer" (featuring Queen Naija)	2018	103	48	—	—	—	—	—	—	RIAA: Gold; MC: Platinum	Hoodie SZN
"Just Like Me" (featuring Young Thug)	2018	—	—	—	—	—	—	—	—	RIAA: Platinum; BPI: Gold; MC: Platinum	Hoodie SZN
"Baguettes in the Face" (Mustard featuring Nav, Playboi Carti, and A Boogie wit da Hoodie)	2019	81	33	—	47	—	18	—	—	RIAA: Platinum	Perfect Ten
"Young Grizzley World" (Tee Grizzley featuring YNW Melly and A Boogie wit da Hoodie)	2019	—	—	—	—	—	—	—	—	RIAA: Platinum	Scriptures
"Slide (Remix)" (H.E.R featuring Pop Smoke, A Boogie wit da Hoodie and Chris Brown)	2019	—	—	—	—	—	32	—	—	BPI: Silver	Non-album single
"Thug Love"	2020	73	34	—	—	—	—	—	91	MC: Gold	Artist 2.0
"Cinderella Story"	2020	95	47	—	—	—	—	—	—		Artist 2.0
"Me and My Guitar"	2020	58	28	—	—	—	36	—	99	RIAA: 2× Platinum; BPI: Silver; MC: 2× Platinum	Artist 2.0
"Might Not Give Up" (featuring Young Thug)	2020	66	32	—	—	—	23	—	—	RIAA: Gold; MC: Gold	Artist 2.0
"Stain" (featuring DaBaby)	2020	80	38	—	—	—	39	—	—		Artist 2.0
"Hit 'Em Up" (featuring Trap Manny)	2020	113	—	—	—	—	—	—	—		Artist 2.0
"DTB 4 Life"	2020	104	—	—	—	—	—	—	—		Artist 2.0
"Blood on My Denim"	2020	121	—	—	—	—	—	—	—		Artist 2.0
"Luv Is Art" (featuring Lil Uzi Vert)	2020	103	—	—	—	—	—	—	—		Artist 2.0
"It's Crazy" (featuring Melody)	2020	107	—	—	—	—	—	—	—		Artist 2.0
"Secrets"	2020	112	45	—	61	—	—	—	88	RIAA: Platinum; BPI: Gold; MC: Platinum	Artist 2.0
"YKTV" (Nas featuring A Boogie wit da Hoodie and YG)	2021	122	—	—	—	—	—	—	—		King's Disease II
"Man in the Mirror"	2021	82	27	—	56	—	19	—	—	RIAA: Gold; MC: Platinum	B4 AVA
"Glasses"	2021	107	45	—	87	—	—	—	—		B4 AVA
"Notifications"	2021	125	—	—	—	—	—	—	—		B4 AVA
"Be Free"	2021	104	41	—	—	—	—	—	—		B4 AVA
"My Fault" (with King Von)	2022	124	—	—	—	—	—	—	—		What It Means to Be King
"Food for Thought"	2022	118	—	—	—	—	—	—	—		Me vs. Myself
"Money Conversations"	2022	114	—	—	—	—	—	—	—		Me vs. Myself
"Last Time" (featuring G Herbo)	2022	106	—	—	88	—	35	—	—		Me vs. Myself
"Her Birthday"	2023	112	36	—	—	—	37	—	—		B4 BOA
"Booby Trap"	2023	—	—	—	—	—	33	—	—		B4 BOA
"Body" (featuring Cash Cobain)	2024	—	46	—	—	—	35	—	—		Better Off Alone
"Somebody" (featuring Future)	2024	—	—	—	—	—	21	—	—		Better Off Alone

== Music videos ==
Year	Title	Director
2016	"Still Think About You"	Kwaz Fraser
2016	"My Sh*t"	Benji Filmz
2016	"Jungle"	Gerard Victor
2016	"Bando"	Benji Filmz
2016	"Friend Zone"	Picture Perfect
2016	"Not a Regular Person"	J Williams
2016	"Bet On It"	Unknown
2016	"Timeless"	Unknown
2016	"Baecation"	Gerard Victor
2016	"Macaroni"	Wiley Films
2016	"IDK"	Picture Perfect
2017	"Floyd Mayweather (Remix)"	20kvisuals
2017	"Proud of Me Now"	Unknown
2017	"Bag on Me"	Unknown
2017	"Wrong N***a"	Denzel Williams
2017	"Drowning"	Rite Brothers
2017	"Beast Mode"	Travis Montgomery
2018	"Say A"	Micheal Garcia
2018	"Somebody"	Gerard Victor
2018	"No Promises"	JMB
2018	"Way Too Fly"	Daps
2018	"Best Friend"	Unknown
2019	"4 Min Convo (Favorite Song)"	JMB
2019	"Look Back at It"	JMB
2019	"Swervin"	Edgar Estevez
2019	"Mood Swings"	Eif Rivera & A Boogie wit da Hoodie
2020	"King of My City"	A Boogie wit da Hoodie
2020	"Bleed"	A Boogie wit da Hoodie
2020	"Flood My Wrist"	Picture Perfect
2020	"Might Not Give Up"	Hype Williams
2020	"Reply"	Chariot Pictures
2020	"Secrets"	au.79film
2020	"It's Crazy"	au.79film
2021	"9 Bridge"	Edgar Esteves

== Guest appearances ==
List of non-single guest appearances, with other performing artists, showing year released and album name
Title	Year	Other performer(s)	Album
"Bet on It"	2016	PnB Rock	Money, Hoes and Flows
"My Shit (Remix)"	2016	Fabolous	Summertime Shootout 2: The Level Up
"Come On"	2016	Jaquae, Fatboy Izzo	You'll See: The James Harris Experience
"Crzy" (Remix)	2016	Kehlani	—N/a
"Diamonds"	2016	Young Scooter, Don Q	Jugg King
"Stand Back"	2017	PnB Rock	GTTM: Goin Thru the Motions
"Playa No More	2017	PnB Rock, Quavo	"GTTM: Goin Thru the Motions"
"Glory Bridge"	2017	Chief Keef	Dedication
"GG (Remix)"	2017	Youngboy Never Broke Again	—N/a
"Reminiscing"	2017	Kodak Black	Painting Pictures
"Wait" (Remix)	2018	Maroon 5	—N/a
"Keke"	2018	6ix9ine, Fetty Wap	Day 69
"If It Ain't Right"	2018	Tory Lanez	Love Me Now?
"Waka"	2018	6ix9ine	Dummy Boy
"100 Grand"	2018	Lil Durk, Ty Dolla Sign	Signed to the Streets 3
"Showed You"	2018	DJ Esco, Future, Young Thug, Dej Loaf	Kolorblind
"Goddamn"	2019	Tyga	Legendary
"Red Lights"	2019	JXN	—N/a
"Halo"	2019	Cryssy Bandz	—N/a
"Like Mike"	2019	Rich the Kid, Jay Critch	The World Is Yours 2
"Young Grizzley World"	2019	Tee Grizzley, YNW Melly	Scriptures
"Alone"	2019	Trap Manny	Trap Seazon
"Baguettes in the Face"	2019	DJ Mustard, NAV, Playboi Carti	Perfect Ten
"1000 Nights"	2019	Ed Sheeran, Meek Mill	No.6 Collaborations Project
"Put You On"	2019	PnB Rock	TrapStar Turnt PopStar
"Still Alive"	2019	Berner, G-Eazy	El Chivo
"Bit*huary (Remix)"	2019	Shordie Shordie, Wiz Khalifa	—N/a
"Blind"	2019	Gucci Mane	Delusions of Grandeur
"U Said"	2019	Lil Durk	Love Songs 4 the Streets 2
"So Cold"	2019	Max B	House Money
"Monica Lewinsky"	2019	Saint Jhn, DaBaby	Ghetto Lenny's Love Songs/While the World Was Burning
"Thot Box"	2019	Hitmaka, YBN Nahmir, Meek Mill, 2 Chainz, Tyga	Big Tuh
"Running the Streets"	2019	Rick Ross, Denzel Curry	Port of Miami 2
"Big Picture"	2019	Davido, Gunna, Dremo	A Good Time
"Gone for the Summer"	2019	Fabolous	Summertime Shootout 3: Coldest Summer Ever
"Wolf"	2020	Lil Tr33zy	—N/a
"Like That"	2020	Yo Gotti, Ty Dolla Sign	Untrapped
"Foreigner"	2020	Pop Smoke	Meet the Woo 2
"Far Away II"	2020	Jessie Reyez, JID	Before Love Came to Kill Us (Deluxe)
"The Get Back"	2020	Juelz Santana	#FREESANTANA
"Hocus Pocus"	2020	Blueface, DJ Kay Slay & Moneybagg Yo	Famous Cryp (Reloaded)
"Somebody"	2020	Internet Money, Lil Tecca	B4 the Storm
"R&B Shit"	2020	J.I the Prince of N.Y	Hood Life Krisis, Vol. 3
"Millions"	2020	Wiz Khalifa	The Saga of Wiz Khalifa
"Sheesh"	2021	Trap Manny	In Trap We Trust
"No Stress"	2021	Capo Plaza	Plaza
"This Is My Year"	2021	DJ Khaled, Big Sean, Puff Daddy, Rick Ross	Khaled Khaled
"Givenchy 2.0 Freestyle"	2021	DJ Drewski, Trap Manny	Seat at the Table
"Latest Trends (Remix)"	2021	A1 x J1	Non-single remix
"Drop a Location"	2021	YG, Mozzy	Kommunity Service
"9 Bridge"	2021	Rowdy Rebel	Non-single
"Ghetto Love Birds"	2021	Yung Bleu	Moon Boy
"No Love Songs"	2021	Richie Rozay	Non-single
"Track Star (Remix)"	2021	Mooski, Chris Brown, Yung Bleu	Non-single Remix
"YKTV"	2021	Nas, YG	Kings Disease II
"Run it Up"	2021	Sheff G, Sleepy Hallow	From the Can
"Demons (Remix)"	2021	Stunna Gambino	Non-single Remix
"Keeper"	2021	OhGeesy	GEEZYWORLD
"Bestie"	2021	Culture Jam, Capella Grey	Kawhi Leonard Presents: Culture Jam (Vol.1)
"Family"	2021	David Guetta, Ty Dolla $ign, Bebe Rexha	Non-single
"My Everything (Part II)"	2021	B-Lovee	Non-single Remix
"My Fault"	2022	King Von	What It Means to Be King
"Boom Boom"	2022	B-Lovee	Misunderstood
"Mustard's Interlude"	2022	Coi Leray	Trendsetter
"Distance (P-Valley Remix)"	2022	Jucee Froot	P-Valley Season 2 Soundtrack
"Dont Get Me Started"	2022	Don Q	Corleone
"Warzone"	2022	Stunna Gambino	Vultures Dont Kry
"New York"	2022	Rowdy Rebel, Jadakiss	Rebel vs Rowdy
"Habibi (Remix)"	2022	Ricky Rich	Non-Single Remix
"Iykyk"	2022	Lil Durk, Ella Mai	7220 (Deluxe)
"Role Call"	2022	Tory Lanez	Sorry 4 What
"Me, Myself & I"	2022	G Herbo	Survivor's Remorse: A Side & B Side
"Lay Up N' Chill"	2022	Pink Sweat$	Non-Single
"Ask"	2023	Tay B	4Eva In My Bag (Deluxe)
"HO4ME"	2023	DJ Drama, Lil Baby	I'M REALLY LIKE THAT
"Already Know"	2023	Young Pooda, Angelica Vila	Non-Single
"PMR"	2023	Desiigner	Non-Single
"Say Less"	2023	Swizz Beatz, Lil Durk	Hip Hop 50, Vol. 2
"Worth a Heartbreak"	2024	Mustard, Blxst	Faith of a Mustard Seed
