= Me vs. Myself =

Studio album by A Boogie wit da Hoodie
- Released: December 9, 2022
- Length: 68:55
- Labels: Atlantic; Highbridge
- Producers: A Boogie wit da Hoodie; 254Bodi; 30 Roc; Alex Estevez; Angel T God; Ali Roots A16; Bass Charity; Bricks da Mane; C-Gutta; Chuck Taylor; Daniel Deleyto; Dasda; Dez Wright; DLo on the Beat; Don Cannon; Evertime; Go Grizzly; Jay LV; JoeFromYo; Kofo; Lee Major; London Jae; Matthew Spatola; Mitch Mula; Mosaic; Niaggi; Nick Mira; Noir1070; Nonstop da Hitman; Nova Wav; Off & Out; OG Parker; P2J; Ricardo Josias; Rio Leyva; Rogét Chahayed; S.Dot; Sean Momberger; Simon Kempner; Smash David; The Atomix; Travis Marsh; Wheezy; Yogi; ZenTachi

A Boogie wit da Hoodie chronology
B4 AVA (2021)	Me vs. Myself (2022)	Better Off Alone (2024)

Singles from Me vs. Myself
- 1. "Playa" Released: April 1, 2022; 2. "B.R.O. (Better Ride Out)" Released: October 7, 2022; 3. "Take Shots" Released: October 21, 2022

Me vs. Myself is the fourth studio album by American rapper A Boogie wit da Hoodie. It was released through Atlantic Records and Highbridge the Label on December 9, 2022. The album features guest appearances from Roddy Ricch, Tory Lanez, Kodak Black, G Herbo, Lil Durk, Don Q, and H.E.R. The deluxe edition was released three days later and included an additional guest appearance from the late PnB Rock for the only newly-added track, "Needed That". Production was handled by a variety of record producers, such as A Boogie himself, S.Dot, P2J, Kofo, Wheezy, Don Cannon, Lee Major, Sean Momberger, Rogét Chahayed, Band on the Beat, Chuck Taylor, OG Parker, Smash David, and Dez Wright, among others. Me vs. Myself received generally positive reviews, with many viewing it as a return to form for A Boogie after mostly negative reception of his previous studio album, Artist 2.0.

== Background ==
On the same day the album was released, A Boogie was interviewed by GQ, in which he talked about how the album is different from his previous projects:

I feel like every single album, I take a step or two forward. Some of my fans prefer my older songs because they have specific memories from that time that the music is forever tied to. But the truth is, I got better. I would love for my fans to play the first Artist mix tape and then play Me Vs. Myself. I promise you, the quality, the wordplay, everything is better. You wouldn't even think it's the same person.

== Release and promotion ==
On September 5, 2022, A Boogie announced the title of the album and release date and also shared its cover art through social media, which was originally scheduled to be released on November 4. On October 27, he revealed the tracklist, which listed the song titles and blurred out the names of the featured artists for their unreleased songs with him, along with listing which side each song is on: "Artist" or "A Boogie". On October 31, four days before it was originally set to be released, he announced that it would be pushed back to December due to the fact that Canadian rapper Drake and Atlanta-based rapper 21 Savage released their collaborative studio album, Her Loss, the same day.

=== Singles ===
The lead single of the album, "Playa", which features American singer-songwriter H.E.R., was released on April 1, 2022. The second single, "B.R.O. (Better Ride Out)", which features fellow American rapper Roddy Ricch, was released on October 7. The third single, "Take Shots", which features Canadian rapper and singer Tory Lanez, was released on October 21. The sole promotional single, "Ballin", was released on November 3.

The single "24 Hours", which features fellow American rapper Lil Durk, was released as the lead single from A Boogie's debut extended play, B4 AVA, on May 21, 2021. The song "Man in the Mirror" is also taken from B4 AVA, which was released on December 10 that year. Both tracks appear on Me vs. Myself.

== Critical reception ==
Professional ratings
Aggregate scores
Source	Rating
Metacritic	63/100
Review scores
Source	Rating
AllMusic	4/5 stars
Clash	6/10
Rolling Stone	2.5/5 stars
Slant Magazine	2/5 stars
The Telegraph	3/5 stars

At Metacritic, which assigns a normalized rating out of 100 to reviews from professional publications, the album received an average score of 63 based on five reviews, indicating "generally favorable reviews".

AllMusic stated, "The album runs more than an hour, with 23 tracks ruminating on similar musical and topical themes, but somehow Me vs. Myself stays fresh throughout. This is due in part to the strong production (which includes work from Boogie himself) and also a plethora of exciting guest star appearances." Kathleen Johnston of The Telegraph wrote, "Most of the songs here do somewhat merge into one, long, party soundtrack that is enjoyable to listen to and yet entirely forgettable. This is not a record that moves the needle on artistry, but it is sure to wrack [sic] up considerable streaming numbers in the rap-obsessed States in particular, helped along the way by strategic decisions such as big-name features and extended track list. Dubose knows his blueprint – hoods off to him." Robin Murray of Clash wrote, "Nothing here stands out as bad, per se, it's more that A Boogie Wit Da Hoodie has long since perfected this approach. It's weighed down by expectation, and the knowledge that previous hits are already out there – probably on your own playlist. A record that feels very much like a side-step, Me vs Myself contains little of the soul-searching that the title suggests." Mosi Reeves of Rolling Stone commented, "Me vs. Myself is meant to reflect Boogie's awareness of his strengths and limitations, but he's balling too hard to get too deep." Paul Attard of Slant Magazine wrote, "The rest of the material on Me vs. Myself isn't so much bad as one-dimensional. Slick, inoffensive pieces of pop-rap like 'Ballin' and 'Regular' have a few winning charms going for them, but their inclusions, along with tracks like the patronizing 'Come Here,' suggest an artist who lacks the capacity to push himself out of his comfort zone or self-edit. In the end, A Boogie plays it too safe, and in the process, ultimately proves how accurate the album's title really is."

== Commercial performance ==
Me vs Myself debuted at number six on the US Billboard 200 chart, earning 53,000 album-equivalent units (including 3,000 copies in pure album sales) in its first week. This became A Boogie s fourth US top-ten debut. The album also accumulated a total of 66.92 million on-demand official streams from the album’s songs.

== Track listing ==
No.	Title	Writer(s)	Producer(s)	Length
1.	"Food for Thought"	Artist Dubose; Dominique Mitchell	Mitch Mula	2:54
2.	"B.R.O. (Better Ride Out)" (featuring Roddy Ricch)	Dubose; Rodrick Moore, Jr.; Shaun Thomas	S.Dot; A Boogie wit da Hoodie	2:58
3.	"Take Shots" (featuring Tory Lanez)	Dubose; Daystar Peterson; Richard Isong; Kevin Ekofo; Cameron Giles; LaRon James; Lionel Richie; Mark Mbogo; Nija Charles; Darryl Pittman	P2J; Kofo	4:41
4.	"Water (Drowning Pt. 2)" (featuring Kodak Black)	Dubose; Bill Kapri; Thomas; Patrick Bodi; Jocelyn Donald	254Bodi; S.Dot	3:26
5.	"Money Conversations"	Dubose; Matthew Samuels; Johann Deterville; Dean Maola	Mosaic Music; Yogi; Boi-1da	3:11
6.	"Turn Off the Radio"	Dubose; Shaffer Smith; Tor E. Hermansen; Mikkel S. Eriksen; Cameron Giles; Nathan Butler; Sean Hall; Matthew Spatola; Daniel Deleyto; Damile Coste; Joseph Zoumboulias	JoeFromYO; Daniel Deleyto; DLo Beatz; Matt Spatola	3:05
7.	"Last Time" (featuring G Herbo)	Dubose; Herbert Wright III; Thomas; Spatola; Coste; Zoumboulias; Jengis Rahmanoski; Eeti Eratuli	Chuck Taylor; S.Dot; Matt Spatola; JoeFromYO; Off & Out; DLo Beatz; Evertime	2:59
8.	"I Need It"	Dubose; Samuel Gloade; Aqeel Tate; Mbogo; Eric Sloan; Quincy Anderson	30 Roc; ZenTachi	3:36
9.	"Ballin"	Dubose; Wesley Glass; Donald Cannon; Leigh Elliott; Sean Momberger; Elliott Trent	Wheezy; Lee Major; Don Cannon; Elliott Trent; Sean Momberger	2:56
10.	"Emotions"	Dubose; Usher Raymond IV; Jermaine Dupri; Bryan-Michael Cox; Brittany Coney; Denisia Andrews; Travis Marsh	Travis Marsh; Nova Wav	3:00
11.	"Bounce Back"	Dubose; Kevin Price; Jaucquez Lowe; Charles Driggers; Alex Estevez	London Jae; Matik.am; Go Grizzly; BricksDaMane	3:01
12.	"Come Here"	Dubose; Joshua Parker; Thomas; Gary Fountaine; Jorge Augusto; Luzian Tuetsch; Feliciano Ecar; Harissis Tsakmaklis; Jorge Miguel	OG Parker; Nonstop Da Hitman; Bass Charity; S.Dot	3:54
13.	"Damn Homie" (featuring Lil Durk)	Dubose; Durk Banks; Curtis Jackson III; Luis Resto; Darrell Branch; Frederick Perren; Keni St. Lewis; John Freeman; Nicholas Skopek; Nicholas Mira; Rio Leyva; Noah Nelson	Nick Mira; Noir1070; Rio Leyva	3:08
14.	"Friends with Benefits"	Dubose; Darwin Quinn; Aliandro Prawl; Lowe	C-Gutta; Ali P; London Jae	2:09
15.	"Chanelly" (with Don Q)	Dubose; Le'Quincy Anderson; Coste; Zoumboulias	DLo Beatz; JoeFromYO	2:28
16.	"February"	Dubose; Smith; Hermansen; Eriksen; Thomas; Sina Dadashi	Dasda; S.Dot	2:34
17.	"Regular"	Dubose; Simon Kempner; Carlos Young; Ta'von Washington	Simon Kempner; The Atomix	3:04
18.	"Soul Snatcher"	Dubose; Coste; Junior Sinchi; Angel Morales	Jay Lv; DLo Beatz; Angel; JoeFromYO	2:50
19.	"24 Hours" (featuring Lil Durk)	Dubose; Banks; Rogét Chahayed; Thomas; Coste; Rahmanoski; Zoumboulias	DLo Beatz; Chuck Taylor; S.Dot; JoeFromYO; Rogét Chahayed	3:25
20.	"Man in the Mirror"	Dubose; Parker; Samuel Jimenez; Dylan Cleary-Krell; Thomas	S.Dot; Dez Wright; OG Parker; Smash David	3:35
21.	"Back It Up"	Dubose; Thomas; Bodi; William Clarke; Sacha Katz	254Bodi; Zoo Kids; S.Dot	3:15
22.	"Playa" (featuring H.E.R.)	Dubose; Gabriella Wilson; Glass; Momberger; Joseph Thomas; Rodney Jerkins; Bryan-Michael Cox; Troy Johnson; Marques Houston; Taurian Shropshire; Tanya White; Japhe Tejeda; Jolyon Skinner; Michelle Williams	Sean Momberger; Wheezy	2:38
Total length:				68:55

Me vs. Myself deluxe edition bonus track
No.	Title	Writer(s)	Producer(s)	Length
23.	"Needed That" (with PnB Rock)	Dubose; Rakim Allen; Gianni van den Brom; Ricardo Rahangmetan	Josias; Niaggi	3:26
Total length:				72:21

Notes

- "Food for Thought", "Take Shots", "Turn Off the Radio", "I Need It", "Emotions", "Come Here", "Friends with Benefits", "February", "Soul Snatcher", "24 Hours", and "Playa" appear on the "Artist" side.
- "B.R.O. (Better Ride Out)", "Water", "Money Conversations", "Last Time", "Ballin", "Bounce Back", "Damn Homie", "Chanelly", "Regular", "Man in the Mirror", and "Back It Up" appear on the "A Boogie" side.

== Charts ==
=== Weekly charts ===
Weekly chart performance for Me vs. Myself
Chart (2022)	Peak position
Australian Albums (ARIA)	60
Belgian Albums (Ultratop Flanders)	162
Canadian Albums (Billboard)	6
Dutch Albums (Album Top 100)	37
Irish Albums (IRMA)	77
Norwegian Albums (VG-lista)	38
UK Albums (Official Charts)	22
US Billboard 200	6
US Top R&B/Hip-Hop Albums (Billboard)	4

=== Year-end charts ===
Year-end chart performance for Me vs. Myself
Chart (2023)	Position
US Top R&B/Hip-Hop Albums (Billboard)	80

== Certifications ==
Certifications for Me vs. Myself
Region	Certification	Certified units/sales
Canada (Music Canada)	Gold	40,000^{‡}
^{‡} Sales+streaming figures based on certification alone.
