= My Shit =

My Shit may refer to:

- "My Shit" (Scribe song), 2007
- "My Shit" (A Boogie wit da Hoodie song), 2016
- "My Shit", a 2012 single by Johnny Polygon
