= Part of Me =

Part of Me or A Part of Me may refer to:

== Songs ==
- "Part of Me" (A Boogie wit da Hoodie song), 2025
- "Part of Me" (Chris Cornell song), 2008
- "Part of Me" (Cian Ducrot song), 2023
- "Part of Me" (Katy Perry song), 2012
- "Part of Me" (Stellar song), 1999
- "Part of Me", by Ayumi Hamasaki from A Best 2, 2007
- "A Part of Me", by Device from the deluxe edition of Device, 2013
- "Part of Me", by Hybrid Theory from Hybrid Theory EP, 1999
- "Part of Me", by Royce da 5'9" from Street Hop, 2008
- "Part of Me", by Tool from Opiate, 1992

== Other uses ==
- Katy Perry: Part of Me, a 2012 film
- Part of Me (TV series), English name of En otra piel, a 2014 telenovela
- Badeline, also known as part of me in Celeste

== See also ==
- "Biggest Part of Me", a song by Ambrosia from One Eighty, 1980
