= Nonchalant (disambiguation) =

Nonchalant is an American rapper. "Nonchalant" may also refer to

- "Nonchalant" (6lack song)
- "Nonchalant" (A Boogie wit da Hoodie song)
- "Nonchalant" (Gucci Mane song)
