= Still Think About You =

2016 song by A Boogie wit da Hoodie

Song by A Boogie wit da Hoodie

from the album Artist
- Released: 2016
- Length: 4:06
- Label: Highbridge; Atlantic
- Songwriters: Artist Dubose; Garcia Junior; David Osiris Caberea; Vladimir Santana
- Producer: PlugStudiosNYC

A Boogie wit da Hoodie singles chronology
"My Shit" (2016)	"Still Think About You" (2016)	"Jungle" (2016)

Music video
- "Still Think About You" on YouTube

"Still Think About You" is a song by American rapper A Boogie wit da Hoodie from his debut mixtape Artist (2016). It was produced by PlugStudiosNYC.

== Background ==
In an interview with Genius, A Boogie wit da Hoodie explained his inspiration for the song:

The moment I wrote this song, I was in the process of thinking about this girl that did me wrong. I started going out with this girl for about four months. She told me she was pregnant, so I'm thinking it's mine. At first I was buggin' like, "Damn, I don't want a baby." And then one day she disappeared on me, then I seen a picture with her and some nigga, she was pregnant and shit. I was just thinking like, "Damn this bitch really did me wrong." She put a knife in my back, she really fucked me up.

== Charts ==
Chart (2016)	Peak position
US Bubbling Under R&B/Hip-Hop Songs (Billboard)	10

== Certifications ==
Region	Certification	Certified units/sales
New Zealand (RMNZ)	Platinum	30,000^{‡}
United Kingdom (BPI)	Silver	200,000^{‡}
United States (RIAA)	5× Platinum	5,000,000^{‡}
^{‡} Sales+streaming figures based on certification alone.
