= Playa (A Boogie wit da Hoodie song) =

2022 single by A Boogie wit da Hoodie

Single by A Boogie wit da Hoodie featuring Ella Bands or H.E.R.

from the album Me vs. Myself
- Released: April 1, 2022
- Length: 2:49 (Ella Bands version); 2:38 (H.E.R. version)
- Label: Atlantic; Highbridge
- Songwriters: Artist Dubose; Gabriella Wilson; Wesley Glass; Sean Momberger; Joseph Thomas; Rodney Jerkins; Bryan-Michael Cox; Troy Johnson; Marques Houston; Taurian Shropshire; Tanya White; Japhe Tejeda; Jolyon Skinner; Michelle Williams
- Producers: Wheezy; Momberger

A Boogie wit da Hoodie singles chronology
"Hit Different" (2022)	"Playa" (2022)	"Habibi" (2022)

Ella Bands singles chronology
"Playa" (2022)

H.E.R. singles chronology
"Closer" (2022)	"Playa" (2022)	"Dance to the Music" (2022)

Music video
- "Playa (feat. Ella Bands)" on YouTube

Alternate cover
- Cover art of the version featuring H.E.R.

"Playa" is a song by American rapper A Boogie wit da Hoodie, released on April 1, 2022 as the lead single from his fourth studio album Me vs. Myself (2022). There are two versions of the song: one features vocals from his ex-girlfriend Ella Bands and the other features American singer H.E.R. The song was produced by Wheezy and Sean Momberger.

== Composition ==
The song contains a sample of "Still Not a Player" by Big Pun featuring Joe and revolves around romantic love. It finds A Boogie wit da Hoodie committing to a serious relationship with his lover, adding that he no longer wants to be a "playa". He and Ella Bands sing about being each other's only love. In the version with H.E.R., H.E.R. plays the role of A Boogie's companion who is skeptical of his words.

== Music video ==
The music video directed by madebyJAMES and released alongside the single. It shows A Boogie wit da Hoodie and Ella Bands spending time together in the Bahamas by the beach.

== Charts ==
Chart performance for "Playa"
Chart (2022)	Peak position
US Bubbling Under Hot 100 (Billboard)	11
US Hot R&B/Hip-Hop Songs (Billboard)	50
