= Nora Payne =

American singer-songwriter

Nora Shena Payne
- Born: Washington, D.C., United States
- Genres: R&B; soul; hip-hop
- Occupations: Singer-songwriter; background vocalist

Nora Payne is an American singer-songwriter and background vocalist best known for her work with producer Rodney "Darkchild" Jerkins. Payne has written for Michael Jackson, Will Smith, Jennifer Lopez, and Brandy, among others.

In October 2017, Payne was reported missing by her family after a layover at O'Hare International Airport and was found two weeks later in a Chicago, Illinois hospital.

== Songwriting and background vocal credits ==
Credits are courtesy of Discogs, Spotify, and AllMusic.

Title	Year	Artist	Album
"The Promise"	1997	Ray J	Everything You Want
"Can't Run, Can't Hide"	1997	Ray J	Everything You Want
"Finally Over You"	1997	Ronee Martin	Soul Of My Heart
"Well Alright"	1998	CeCe Winans	Everlasting Love
"Girl's Night Out"	1999	Candy Dulfer	Girl's Night Out
"He Wasn't Man Enough"	2000	Toni Braxton	The Heat
"(I Can't Get No) Satisfaction"	2000	Britney Spears	Oops!... I Did It Again
"Unbreakable"	2001	Michael Jackson	Invincible
"Heartbreaker"	2001	Michael Jackson	Invincible
"You Rock My World"	2001	Michael Jackson	Invincible
"That's The Way"	2001	Jennifer Lopez	J.Lo
"Formal Invite" (Featuring Pharrell)	2001	Ray J	This Ain't a Game
"No"	2001	Kandice Love	Rush Hour 2: Soundtrack
"B Rocka Intro"	2002	Brandy	Full Moon (Brandy album)
"When You Touch Me"	2002	Brandy	Full Moon (Brandy album)
"What About Us?"	2002	Brandy	Full Moon (Brandy album)
"WOW"	2002	Brandy	Full Moon (Brandy album)
"Block Party"	2002	Will Smith	Born to Reign
"Life Goes On"	2002	LeAnn Rimes	Twisted Angel
"He Said"	2002	Mary Mary	Incredible
"Feel So Good"	2003/2004	Brandy	Escape (Shelved Fourth Album)
"Leave"	2003/2004	Brandy	Escape (Shelved Fourth Album)
"Take Me Away" (Given to Tarralyn Ramsey)	2003/2004	Brandy	Escape (Shelved Fourth Album)
"Better Than The Day" (Given to Kiley Dean)	2003/2004	Brandy	Escape (Shelved Fourth Album)
"Confused" (Given to Kiley Dean)	2003/2004	Brandy	Escape (Shelved Fourth Album)
"Dismissed"	2003/2004	Brandy	Escape (Shelved Fourth Album)
"Lock In Key"	2003/2004	Brandy	Escape (Shelved Fourth Album)
"Please Protect My Heart"	2006	Tamia	Between Friends
"Look Back at It"	2018	A Boogie wit da Hoodie	Hoodie SZN

== Awards and nominations ==
Year	Ceremony	Award	Result	Ref
2003	BMI Urban Awards	BMI Urban Most-Performed Songs (What About Us?)	Won	
2018	BMI Urban Awards	BMI Urban Most-Performed Songs (Look Back at It)	Won	
