= Did Me Wrong =

2023 single by A Boogie wit da Hoodie

Single by A Boogie wit da Hoodie

from the album B4 BOA and Better Off Alone
- Released: October 24, 2023
- Length: 2:57
- Label: Highbridge; Atlantic
- Songwriters: Artist Dubose; Shaun Thomas; Patrick Bodi; Isaac Hayes; Quincy Anderson
- Producers: S.Dot; 254Bodi

A Boogie wit da Hoodie singles chronology
"Remember That" (2023)	"Did Me Wrong" (2023)

Music video
- "Did Me Wrong" on YouTube

"Did Me Wrong" is a song by American rapper A Boogie wit da Hoodie from his EP B4 BOA (2023). It was released as the EP's lead single on October 24, 2023. Produced by S.Dot and 254Bodi, it contains a sample of "Ike Mood 1" by Isaac Hayes. It was also released as part of his fifth studio album, Better Off Alone (2024).

== Composition ==
Over the sample, A Boogie wit da Hoodie reflects on a failed and toxic romantic relationship and addresses his critics and the people plotting his downfall.

== Music video ==
An official music video was directed by Kai Cenat and released on October 24, 2023. In it, A Boogie wit da Hoodie is seen being controlled as a marionette by an unknown woman and fighting against it, singing under rainfall, recording at a studio, and walking down a street while being chased by a mob of people. Cenat makes a cameo in the video, appearing when A Boogie is in the studio.

== Charts ==
=== Weekly charts ===
Weekly chart performance for "Did Me Wrong"
Chart (2023–2024)	Peak position
US Bubbling Under Hot 100 (Billboard)	22
US Hot R&B/Hip-Hop Songs (Billboard)	43
US Rhythmic Airplay (Billboard)	6

=== Year-end charts ===
2024 year-end chart performance for "Did Me Wrong"
Chart (2024)	Position
US Rhythmic (Billboard)	33
