= Beast Mode (A Boogie wit da Hoodie song) =

2017 song by A Boogie wit da Hoodie featuring PnB Rock and YoungBoy Never Broke Again

Single by A Boogie wit da Hoodie featuring PnB Rock and YoungBoy Never Broke Again

from the album The Bigger Artist
- Released: September 8, 2017
- Length: 4:18
- Label: Highbridge; Atlantic
- Songwriters: Artist Dubose; Rakim Allen; Kentrell Gaulden; John Hyszko
- Producer: Young Troy

A Boogie wit da Hoodie singles chronology
"Pills & Automobiles" (2017)	"Beast Mode" (2017)	"Say A'" (2017)

PnB Rock singles chronology
"Feelins" (2017)	"Beast Mode" (2017)	"Issues" (2017)

YoungBoy Never Broke Again singles chronology
"No Smoke" (2017)	"Beast Mode" (2017)	"Outside Today" (2017)

Music video
- "Beast Mode" on YouTube

"Beast Mode" is a song by American rapper A Boogie wit da Hoodie, released on September 8, 2017, as the second single from his debut studio album The Bigger Artist (2017). It features American rappers PnB Rock and YoungBoy Never Broke Again. The song was produced by Young Troy.

== Critical reception ==
The song received mediocre reviews from critics. Writing for Vibe, Darryl Robertson stated that all three artists offer "grim verses, making for a memorable and organic street record". He noted that PnB Rock "delivers his signature Auto-tuned hook and verse" and that YoungBoy "closes out the song’s third verse with his concrete jungle-inspired raps." HipHopDX's Scott Glaysher stated that on the track, "listeners don’t learn much about [A Boogie wit da Hoodie]" due to him rapping "filler lines" on the song. He also stated that A Boogie's "hardcore rhymes don’t mix well with his Auto-Tuned vocals." Writing for Pitchfork, Kristin Corry stated that the track "screams like a faulty tribute" to Future's July 2015, "Freak Hoe" off of his third studio album, DS2.

== Music video ==
The Travis Montgomery-directed music video was released months after the song's official audio on December 12, 2017. The video shows the three rappers at Michael Jordan's basketball facility, Terminal 23 in New York City. It also shows the rappers playing NBA 2K18 together while rapping their lyrics.

== Charts ==
Chart performance for "Beast Mode"
Chart (2017)	Peak position
US Billboard Hot 100	86
US Hot R&B/Hip-Hop Songs (Billboard)	38

== Certifications ==
Certifications for "Beast Mode"
Region	Certification	Certified units/sales
Canada (Music Canada)	Platinum	80,000^{‡}
United States (RIAA)	Platinum	1,000,000^{‡}
^{‡} Sales+streaming figures based on certification alone.
