= Steppas =

2024 single by A Boogie wit da Hoodie

Single by A Boogie wit da Hoodie

from the album Better Off Alone
- Released: March 29, 2024
- Genre: Trap
- Length: 3:20
- Label: Atlantic; Highbridge
- Songwriters: Artist Dubose; London Holmes; Alex Petit; Antonio Williams; Dylan Cleary-Krell; Jordan Holt-May; Le'Quincy Anderson; Martell Smith-Williams; Daniel Raab
- Producers: London on da Track; CashMoneyAP; Tone Deaf; Dez Wright; Daniel Moras

A Boogie wit da Hoodie singles chronology
| "Up Down (Remix)" (2024) | "Steppas" (2024) |

Music video
- "Steppas" on YouTube

"Steppas" is a song by American rapper A Boogie wit da Hoodie, released on March 29, 2024, as the lead single from his fifth studio album, Better Off Alone (2024). It was produced by London on da Track, CashMoneyAP, Tone Deaf, Dez Wright and Daniel Moras.

== Composition and critical reception ==
Zachary Horvath of HotNewHipHop wrote of the song, "The beat is grand with is [sic] strong horn sections and thumping trap beat. Boogie is rapping in his usual smooth and laid-back flow with intimidating and braggadocious verses."

== Charts ==
Chart performance for "Steppas"
| Chart (2024) | Peak position |
|---|---|
| New Zealand Hot Singles (RMNZ) | 27 |
