= Look Back at It =

Single by A Boogie wit da Hoodie

from the album Hoodie SZN
- Released: December 7, 2018 (original version); February 20, 2019 (with Olexesh); March 28, 2019 (with Park Woo-jin); June 7, 2019 (with Capo Plaza)
- Length: 3:04 (with Park Woo-jin); 2:59 (original version)
- Label: Highbridge; Atlantic
- Songwriters: Artist Julius Dubose; Christian Ward; Christopher Dotson; Fred Jerkins III; LaShawn Daniels; Matthew Samuels; Michael Jackson; Nora Payne; Rodney Jerkins
- Producer: Jahaan Sweet

A Boogie wit da Hoodie singles chronology
"Right Moves" (2018)	"Look Back at It" (2018)	"Lips Don't Lie" (2019)

Music video
- "Look Back at It" on YouTube

"Look Back at It" is a song by American rapper A Boogie wit da Hoodie, released as the lead single from his second studio album Hoodie SZN in December 2018. It interpolates a sample from Michael Jackson's "Remember the Time" and "You Rock My World". The song was released to rhythmic radio in the United States.

A version with German rapper Olexesh was released on February 20, 2019. A second version with South Korean singer Park Woo-jin of South Korean boy groups AB6IX and formerly Wanna One was also made available online on March 28, while a third with Italian rapper Capo Plaza was later released on June 7.

== Music video ==
The music video for the song was released on January 30, 2019, and filmed in Dekalb Academy of Technology and Environment. It is set in a high school and features a skit introduction with a cameo from the Backpack Kid. A Boogie wit da Hoodie said he set the video in a high school because he considers himself "a voice of the youth".

== Chart performance ==
"Look Back at It" debuted at number 95 on the US Billboard Hot 100 chart on the week of December 22, 2018. The song would eventually reach its peak position at number 27, twenty-one weeks later on the week of May 18, 2019. The song became A Boogie's second highest-charting single to date, after "Numbers", which peaked at number 23. On April 4, 2019, the single was certified Platinum by the Recording Industry Association of America (RIAA) for sales of over 1,000,000 digital copies in the United States.

== Charts ==
=== Weekly charts ===
Chart (2018–2019)	Peak position
Australia (ARIA)	41
Austria (Ö3 Austria Top 40)	58
Belgium (Ultratip Bubbling Under Flanders)	7
Canada Hot 100 (Billboard)	23
Czech Republic Singles Digital (ČNS IFPI)	57
Denmark (Tracklisten)	13
Finland (Suomen virallinen lista)	17
France (SNEP)	45
Germany (GfK)	26
Hungary (Single Top 40)	10
Hungary (Stream Top 40)	22
Ireland (IRMA)	25
Italy (FIMI) Remix featuring Capo Plaza	19
Netherlands (Single Top 100)	88
New Zealand Hot Singles (RMNZ)	22
Norway (VG-lista)	40
Portugal (AFP)	63
Romania (Airplay 100)	10
Slovakia Singles Digital (ČNS IFPI)	48
Sweden (Sverigetopplistan)	76
Switzerland (Schweizer Hitparade)	50
UK Singles (OCC)	51
US Billboard Hot 100	27
US Hot R&B/Hip-Hop Songs (Billboard)	12
US Pop Airplay (Billboard)	31
US Rhythmic Airplay (Billboard)	1
US Rolling Stone Top 100	63

=== Year-end charts ===
Chart (2019)	Position
Canada (Canadian Hot 100)	59
Denmark (Tracklisten)	96
France (SNEP)	142
Italy (FIMI) Remix featuring Capo Plaza	43
US Billboard Hot 100	41
US Hot R&B/Hip-Hop Songs (Billboard)	25
US Rhythmic (Billboard)	4
US Rolling Stone Top 100	34

Chart (2020)	Position
Romania (Airplay 100)	55

== Certifications ==
Region	Certification	Certified units/sales
Australia (ARIA)	Platinum	70,000^{‡}
Austria (IFPI Austria)	Gold	15,000^{‡}
Canada (Music Canada)	7× Platinum	560,000^{‡}
Denmark (IFPI Danmark)	Platinum	90,000^{‡}
France (SNEP)	Platinum	200,000^{‡}
Germany (BVMI)	Gold	200,000^{‡}
Italy (FIMI)	2× Platinum	100,000^{‡}
New Zealand (RMNZ)	2× Platinum	60,000^{‡}
Portugal (AFP)	Gold	5,000^{‡}
United Kingdom (BPI)	Platinum	600,000^{‡}
United States (RIAA)	7× Platinum	7,000,000^{‡}
^{‡} Sales+streaming figures based on certification alone.
