= Water (Drowning Pt. 2) =

2022 song by A Boogie wit da Hoodie featuring Kodak Black

Song by A Boogie wit da Hoodie featuring Kodak Black

from the album Me vs. Myself
- Released: December 6, 2022
- Length: 3:26
- Label: Atlantic; Highbridge
- Songwriters: Artist Dubose; Bill Kapri; Shaun Thomas; Patrick Bodi; Jocelyn Donald
- Producers: S.Dot; 254Bodi

"Water (Drowning Pt. 2)" is a song by American rapper A Boogie wit da Hoodie featuring American rapper Kodak Black. As the title suggests, this is a sequel to their 2017 collaboration "Drowning"; written alongside producers Shaun Thomas, Patrick Bodi, and Jozzy, it is taken from the former's fourth studio album Me vs. Myself (2022), released three days earlier on December 6, 2022.

== Background ==
In an interview with Zane Lowe on Apple Music 1, A Boogie wit da Hoodie said he knew what he would write to the song's beat as soon as he heard it: "I just throw with the same type of, not the same flow, but that same rhythm where you just ride the beat." He added that he believes his song "Drowning" stood as "a whole new start to something new" at the time.

== Composition ==
The song features a heavy bass. It begins with the chorus, in which A Boogie wit da Hoodie warns women who want to have sex with him to be honest and the consequences of cheating. In the first verse, he recounts on growing up in the streets and his rise to success, mentioning that his idol 50 Cent taught him "how to rob" and he moved to Florida to finish high school while under house arrest. Kodak Black performs the second verse, which finds him paying tribute to rapper and singer PnB Rock (who was killed in September 2022), boasting his wealth and also stating his motivation to succeed was for the sake of his family.

== Critical reception ==
The song received generally positive reviews. Kathleen Johnston of The Daily Telegraph called it "one of the strongest tracks" from Me vs. Myself. Robin Murray of Clash wrote, "the impactful 'Water (Drowning Pt. 2)' feels fully realised." In a review of Me vs. Myself, Paul Attard of Slant Magazine stated, "It's the most compelling song on the album, and a stark contrast to the 21 mildly competent heartbreak anthems that surround it."

== Charts ==
Chart performance for "Water (Drowning Pt. 2)"
| Chart (2022) | Peak position |
|---|---|
| Canada Hot 100 (Billboard) | 73 |
| New Zealand Hot Singles (RMNZ) | 20 |
| US Billboard Hot 100 | 97 |
| US Hot R&B/Hip-Hop Songs (Billboard) | 43 |

== Certifications ==
Certifications for "Water (Drowning Pt. 2)"
| Region | Certification | Certified units/sales |
|---|---|---|
| Canada (Music Canada) | Gold | 40,000^{‡} |
^{‡} Sales+streaming figures based on certification alone.
