= Take Shots =

2022 single by A Boogie wit da Hoodie featuring Tory Lanez

Single by A Boogie wit da Hoodie featuring Tory Lanez

from the album Me vs. Myself
- Released: October 21, 2022
- Genre: Contemporary R&B
- Length: 4:42
- Label: Atlantic; Highbridge
- Songwriters: Artist Dubose; Daystar Peterson; Richard Isong; Kevin Ekofo; Cameron Giles; LaRon James; Lionel Richie; Mark Mbogo; Nija Charles; Darryl Pittman
- Producers: P2J; Kofo

A Boogie wit da Hoodie singles chronology
"Lay Up n' Chill" (2022)	"Take Shots" (2022)	"No 808's" (2023)

Tory Lanez singles chronology
"Why Did I" (2022)	"Take Shots" (2022)	"They Don't Know" (2022)

Music video
- "Take Shots" on YouTube

"Take Shots" is a song by American rapper A Boogie wit da Hoodie, released on October 21, 2022, as the third and final single from his fourth studio album Me vs. Myself. Featuring Canadian rapper Tory Lanez, it was produced by P2J and Kofo.

== Composition ==
The song has an "R&B vibe", featuring a guitar loop and "softer", Auto-Tuned vocals from A Boogie wit da Hoodie. Tory Lanez "comes in with rap flows that eventually transition into R&B tones". The lyrics revolve around their careless lifestyles.

== Charts ==
Chart performance for "Take Shots"
Chart (2022)	Peak position
New Zealand Hot Singles (RMNZ)	24
US Bubbling Under Hot 100 (Billboard)	23
