= Hoodie SZN =

Studio album by A Boogie wit da Hoodie
- Released: December 21, 2018
- Recorded: 2017–2018
- Genres: Hip-hop; trap; R&B
- Length: 61:34
- Labels: Atlantic; Highbridge
- Producers: Artist "A Boogie" Dubose (exec.); Quincy "QP" Acheampong (exec.); Sambon "Bubba" Camara (exec.); C.P Dubb; Chaz Mazzota; Ghost; Chris Rose; Figurez; Go Grizzly; Hitmaka; Iloveryno; J. Holt; Jaegen; Jahaan Sweet; Kenny Beats; KillaGraham; London on da Track; Myster Whyte; Nascent; Niaggi; Pluss; Rex Kudo; Richie Souf; Robert Blake, Jr.; SkipOnDaBeat; Wolf Boy Media; Slade da Monsta; T-Minus; The Atomix; Young Troy; Prettyboy P

A Boogie wit da Hoodie chronology
International Artist (2018)	Hoodie SZN (2018)	Artist 2.0 (2020)

Singles from Hoodie SZN
- 1. "Look Back at It" Released: December 7, 2018; 2. "Swervin" Released: July 2, 2019

Hoodie SZN (SZN pronounced "season") is the second studio album by American rapper A Boogie wit da Hoodie. It was released on December 21, 2018, via Atlantic Records and Highbridge The Label. The album features guest appearances from 6ix9ine, Offset, Tyga, Juice WRLD, Queen Naija, Young Thug, Don Q, Trap Manny, Lil Quee, Quando Rondo, PnB Rock, Lil Durk, and Nav.

The album was supported by two singles: "Look Back at It", two weeks ahead of the album, and "Swervin", released later on July 2, 2019.. The track "Odee" had originally been made available online on March 23, 2018. The track "Pull Up" was previously included on the EP International Artist.

Hoodie SZN received mixed reviews, with some critics noting a decline in quality compared to his debut album, The Bigger Artist.

== Background ==
On December 3, 2018, A Boogie released the album's artwork to his Instagram page. The artwork was described by XXL Mag as "rhymer, cloaked in darkness, in the soaking rain wearing a Highbridge the Label hoodie with the actual Bronx High Bridge in the background". In December 2018, A Boogie said that the album's recording process took over a year to complete.

On social media, A Boogie posted that "My Sophomore Album #HoodieSzn drops 12/21/18... It took me over a year to complete and I can’t wait for you all to hear it. This is for my Day 1’s. Thank You for riding with me."

Professional ratings
Review scores
Source	Rating
HipHopDX	3.7/5
Pitchfork	6.8/10
Rolling Stone	3/5 stars

== Commercial performance ==
Hoodie SZN debuted at number two on the US Billboard 200 with 90,000 album-equivalent units (including 6,000 pure album sales) in its first week. In its second week, the album remained at number two on the chart, earning an additional 58,000 units. In its third week, the album climbed to number one on the chart, earning 58,000 more units with 823 copies in traditional album sales. This became A Boogie wit da Hoodie's first US number-one album. In its fourth week, the album remained at number one for a second week, moving 56,000 units with 749 in traditional album sales, making it the lowest-selling number-one album since Billboard began using Nielsen SoundScan to track unit sales. On June 26, 2019, the album was certified platinum by the Recording Industry Association of America (RIAA) for combined sales and album-equivalent units of over a million units in the United States.

== Track listing ==
Credits adapted from Tidal.

No.	Title	Writer(s)	Producer(s)	Length
1.	"Voices in My Head"	Artist Dubose; Jacob Dutton; Christopher Ruelas; Marcus Slade; Mario Sweet	Nascent; Slade da Monsta; Jake One	2:22
2.	"Beasty"	Dubose; Kenneth Blume III; Graham Muron	KillaGraham; Kenny Beats	2:32
3.	"I Did It"	Dubose; Peter Vilorio	Prettyboy P	3:35
4.	"Swervin" (featuring 6ix9ine)	Dubose; Daniel Hernandez; London Holmes; Aubrey Robinson; Kevin Richardson; Roark Bailey	London on da Track	3:08
5.	"Startender" (featuring Offset and Tyga)	Dubose; Kiari Cephus; Michael Stevenson; Tyler Williams; Christian Ward; Christopher Dotson	T-Minus	3:12
6.	"Demons and Angels" (featuring Juice Wrld)	Dubose; Jarad Higgins; Tony Son	Richie Souf	3:34
7.	"Love Drugs and Sex"	Dubose; WolfBoy	Wolfboy	2:37
8.	"Skeezers"	Dubose; Carlos Young; Ta'Von Washington	The Atomix	3:18
9.	"Savage"	Dubose; Young; T. Washington	The Atomix	2:49
10.	"Come Closer" (featuring Queen Naija)	Dubose; Naija Bulls; Justin Timberlake; Timothy Mosley; Scott Storch; Chaz Mazzota; Robert Blake, Jr.; Rock Georges; Ryan Luriea	Chaz Mazzota; iloveryno; Myster Whyte; Robert P. Blake, Jr.; Hitmaka^{[a]}; SkipOnDaBeat^{[a]}	2:36
11.	"Look Back at It"	Dubose; Fred Jerkins III; LaShawn Daniels; Michael Jackson; Rodney Jerkins; Matthew Samuels; Jahaan Sweet; Nora Payne; Ward; Dotson	Jahaan Sweet	2:59
12.	"Just Like Me" (featuring Young Thug)	Dubose; Jeffery Williams; Asheton Hogan	Pluss	3:40
13.	"Bosses & Workers" (featuring Don Q and Trap Manny)	Dubose; Le'Quincy Anderson; Emmanuel Cobbs; Ethan Walker; Christopher Rose	Ghost; Chris Rose	3:27
14.	"Need a Best Friend" (featuring Lil Quee and Quando Rondo)	Dubose; Quinton Griffith; TyQuain Bowman; Blume	Kenny Beats	3:24
15.	"The Reaper"	Dubose; Young; T. Washington	The Atomix	2:56
16.	"Uptown / Bustdown" (featuring PnB Rock and Lil Durk)	Dubose; Rakim Allen; Durk Banks; Jahseh Onfroy; Gianni van den Brom	Niaggi	2:57
17.	"Billie Jean"	Dubose; Kevin Price; Joseph Nguyen	Go Grizzly; Figurez	2:18
18.	"4 Min Convo (Favorite Song)"	Dubose; Christopher Rios; Christopher Washington; Richard Frierson; Jordan Holt; Julian Garfield; Barrington Wright	J. Holt; Barry Wright; Christopher Washington	4:17
19.	"Odee"	Dubose; Jake Aujla; John Hyszko	Jaegen; Young Troy	2:40
20.	"Pull Up" (featuring Nav)	Dubose; Navraj Goraya; Masamune Kudo; Aujla	Jaegen; Rex Kudo	3:13
Total length:				61:34

Notes

- ^{^[a]} signifies an additional producer
- "Look Back at It" contains interpolations from songs performed by Michael Jackson:
  - "Remember the Time", written by Michael Jackson, Teddy Riley and Bernard Belle.
  - "You Rock My World", written by Michael Jackson, Rodney Jerkins.
- XXXTentacion has posthumous vocals on Uptown / Bustdown

== Personnel ==
Credits adapted from Tidal.

- AJ Ruined My Record – recording (tracks 1–18), mixing (tracks 1, 3, 4, 6–9, 11, 13, 15–18, 20)
- Christian QC Quinonez – recording (tracks 5)
- Sauce Miyagi – recording (tracks 5)
- Jacob Richards – mixing (tracks 5, 10, 11)
- Jaycen Joshua – mixing (tracks 5, 10, 11)
- Mike Seaberg – mixing (tracks 5, 10, 11)
- Mono Beats – mastering (tracks 11)
- Rashawn McLean – mixing (tracks 5, 10, 11)
- Juan Mowezz Montero – mixing (tracks 19, 20)
- Alex Tumay – mixing (tracks 2, 14)
- Chris Athens – mastering (all tracks)
- Jahaan Sweet – engineering (tracks 11)
- Hitmaka – additional arrangement (tracks 5)

== Charts ==
=== Weekly charts ===
Chart (2018–2019)	Peak position
Australian Albums (ARIA)	23
Belgian Albums (Ultratop Flanders)	99
Canadian Albums (Billboard)	1
Danish Albums (Hitlisten)	6
Dutch Albums (Album Top 100)	24
Finnish Albums (Suomen virallinen lista)	24
French Albums (SNEP)	121
Irish Albums (IRMA)	80
New Zealand Albums (RMNZ)	31
Norwegian Albums (VG-lista)	25
Swedish Albums (Sverigetopplistan)	58
UK Albums (Official Charts)	23
US Billboard 200	1
US Top R&B/Hip-Hop Albums (Billboard)	1

=== Year-end charts ===
Chart (2019)	Position
Australian Albums (ARIA)	79
Canadian Albums (Billboard)	7
Danish Albums (Hitlisten)	35
Icelandic Albums (Plötutíóindi)	91
UK Albums (OCC)	86
US Billboard 200	10
US Top R&B/Hip-Hop Albums (Billboard)	6
Chart (2020)	Position
US Billboard 200	87
US Top R&B/Hip-Hop Albums (Billboard)	70

=== Decade-end charts ===
Chart (2010–2019)	Position
US Billboard 200	69

== Certifications ==
Region	Certification	Certified units/sales
Canada (Music Canada)	3× Platinum	240,000^{‡}
Denmark (IFPI Danmark)	Platinum	20,000^{‡}
New Zealand (RMNZ)	Platinum	15,000^{‡}
United Kingdom (BPI)	Gold	100,000^{‡}
United States (RIAA)	2× Platinum	2,000,000^{‡}
^{‡} Sales+streaming figures based on certification alone.

== See also ==
- List of Billboard 200 number-one albums of 2019
- List of Billboard number-one R&B/hip-hop albums of 2019
- List of number-one albums of 2019 (Canada)
