= Demons and Angels (song) =

2019 song by A Boogie wit da Hoodie featuring Juice Wrld

Song by A Boogie wit da Hoodie featuring Juice Wrld

from the album Hoodie SZN
- Released: December 21, 2018
- Recorded: 2018
- Length: 3:34
- Label: Highbridge; Atlantic
- Songwriters: Artist Dubose; Jarad Higgins; Tony Son
- Producer: Richie Souf

"Demons and Angels" is a song by American rapper A Boogie wit da Hoodie featuring American rapper Juice Wrld. It was released on December 21, 2018 from the former's second studio album Hoodie SZN (2018) and produced by Richie Souf.

== Background ==
In November 2018, A Boogie Wit Da Hoodie previewed a snippet of the song on social media.

== Critical reception ==
Robert Blair of HotNewHipHop gave a negative response to the song, commenting A Boogie's "inaugural exchanges" with Juice Wrld "leaves much to be desired, a cookie-cutter "for the streams" type of collaboration". Alphonse Pierre of Pitchfork was critical of the collaboration's inclusion on Hoodie SZN, writing "A Boogie's personality is diluted by the sight of Juice WRLD, as the Chicago emo-rap superstar strangely sings about demons and angels as if he's unaware this is an Uptown bottle-service club album."

== Charts ==
Chart (2018–19)	Peak position
Canada (Canadian Hot 100)	86
New Zealand Hot Singles (RMNZ)	19
US Billboard Hot 100	90
US Hot R&B/Hip-Hop Songs (Billboard)	37

== Certifications ==
Region	Certification	Certified units/sales
Canada (Music Canada)	Platinum	80,000^{‡}
New Zealand (RMNZ)	Gold	15,000^{‡}
United States (RIAA)	2× Platinum	2,000,000^{‡}
^{‡} Sales+streaming figures based on certification alone.
