= 24 Hours (A Boogie wit da Hoodie song) =

2021 single by A Boogie wit da Hoodie featuring Lil Durk

Single by A Boogie wit da Hoodie featuring Lil Durk

from the album B4 AVA and Me vs. Myself
- Released: May 21, 2021
- Genre: Melodic hip hop
- Length: 3:26
- Label: Highbridge; Atlantic
- Songwriters: Artist Dubose; Durk Banks; Rogét Chahayed; Shaun Thomas; Damil Coste; Jengis Rahmanoski; Joseph Zoumboulias
- Producers: Chahayed; S. Dot; Band on the Beat; Chuck Taylor

A Boogie wit da Hoodie singles chronology
"Track Star" (2021)	"24 Hours" (2021)

Lil Durk singles chronology
"Quarantine In Houston" (2021)	"24 Hours" (2021)	"Voice of the Heroes" (2021)

"24 Hours" is a song by American rapper A Boogie wit da Hoodie featuring fellow American rapper Lil Durk. It was released as the second single from A Boogie's fourth EP B4 AVA, on May 21, 2021. The song was produced by Rogét Chahayed, S. Dot, Band on the Beat, and Chuck Taylor.

== Background and composition ==
On "24 Hours", A Boogie wit da Hoodie and Lil Durk both "serenade their better halves in a way only these crooners could". The two artists croon about seeing their respective significant others for twenty-four hours a day, seven days a week (forever) on the "melodic" song. The "somber and somewhat sad" song discusses the "ups and downs" of a relationship and how the couples stay down with one another and get through it. A Boogie announced the release of the single on May 18, 2021. He shared a snippet the following day, May 19, 2021.

== Charts ==
Chart performance for "24 Hours"
Chart (2021)	Peak position
Canada Hot 100 (Billboard)	75
New Zealand Hot Singles (RMNZ)	25
US Billboard Hot 100	92
US Hot R&B/Hip-Hop Songs (Billboard)	38

== Certifications ==
Certifications and sales for "24 Hours"
Region	Certification	Certified units/sales
Canada (Music Canada)	Platinum	80,000^{‡}
United States (RIAA)	Platinum	1,000,000^{‡}
^{‡} Sales+streaming figures based on certification alone.
