= Body (A Boogie wit da Hoodie song) =

2024 song by A Boogie wit da Hoodie featuring Cash Cobain

Song by A Boogie wit da Hoodie featuring Cash Cobain

from the album Better Off Alone
- Released: May 17, 2024
- Length: 3:12
- Label: Atlantic; Highbridge
- Songwriters: Artist Dubose; Cashmere Small; Corey Nutile; Luca Fano-Caroti; Nicolas Baran; Jaucquez Lowe
- Producers: Cutz; Luca Beats; Nico Baran

Music video
- "Body" on YouTube

"Body" is a song by American rapper A Boogie wit da Hoodie from his fifth studio album, Better Off Alone (2024). It features American rapper Cash Cobain and was produced by Cutz, Luca Beats and Nico Baran. A UK remix was released on September 6, 2024, featuring British rapper Nemzzz.

== Music video ==
The music video was directed by Phil Meyer and released on May 21, 2024. It sees A Boogie wit da Hoodie and Cash Cobain spending a night out at New York City. They are seen partying, drinking and dancing with a crowd.

== Charts ==
Chart performance for "Body"
Chart (2024–2025)	Peak position
New Zealand Hot Singles (RMNZ)	35
US Hot R&B/Hip-Hop Songs (Billboard)	46
US Rhythmic Airplay (Billboard)	40
