= JXN (musician) =

Australian R&B musician

- Also known as: Jacko Brazier
- Born: Jackson Brazier; 30 June 1993 (age 33)
- Origin: Melbourne, Australia
- Genres: R&B; pop
- Occupation: Musician
- Instruments: Vocals; guitar
- Years active: 2018–present
- Label: Warner

Jackson Brazier (born 30 June 1993), who performs as JXN, is an Australian R&B and pop music singer-songwriter-guitarist and internet personality. He issued his debut six-track extended play, Never a Sad Adventure, in May 2020.

== Career ==
JXN had a following on Instagram as Jacko Brazier, prior to signing with Warner Music Australasia. In November 2018 he released his debut single, "Solitude". He followed with three singles in 2019, "Red Lights" featuring A Boogie Wit Da Hoodie, in April; "Going Off" featuring ASAP Twelvyy, in June; and "Just Okay" in October.

He released his debut extended play, Never a Sad Adventure, in May 2020. Thomas Bleach felt, "his smooth RNB stylings injected with a fresh breeze of alt-pop... resonated with listeners and created an insane hype." Acid Stag's Chris Salcie observed, "the organic and electronic instrumentation utilised blend with absolute ease across the six track offering."

== Touring ==
Jackson supported Allday on the latter's Starry Night Over the Phone 2019 nationwide tour.

== Discography ==
=== Extended plays ===
Title	Details
Never a Sad Adventure	Released: 15 May 2020; Label: Warner Music Australia; Formats: Digital download, streaming

== Basketball career ==
Brazier is also a semi-professional basketball player, having played in the South East Australian Basketball League (SEABL) for the Kilsyth Cobras between 2014 and 2016. He re-joined the Cobras in 2021 after a four-year hiatus to play in the NBL1 South. He is listed as a 195 cm guard.
