= Dekalb Academy of Technology and Environment =

School in Georgia, United States

Coordinates: 33°49′28″N 84°11′58″W

DeKalb Agriculture, Technology and Environment (D.A.T.E.) is a charter school located at 1492 Kelton Drive in Stone Mountain, Georgia, United States. The school has about 759 students in kindergarten through eighth grades (as of the 2021-2022 school year).

D.A.T.E. was named by the Know Magazine Education Guide as being Metro Atlanta's Best Public School for 8th Grade in DeKalb County. D.A.T.E.'s 8th grade class ranked #1 in Reading and #9 in math on the GCRCT. DeKalb Academy of Technology and Environment Elementary and Middle Charter Schools was featured in the book The Places and Faces of DeKalb County Georgia, highlighting its academic success, environmental and technology focus, and parental participation. D.A.T.E. was selected to have a playground built by KABOOM and sponsored by Dr. Pepper Snapple Group. D.A.T.E. students outperformed elementary and middle school students collectively in the DeKalb County School District and State Technology Fair. The school is accredited by AdvancED.

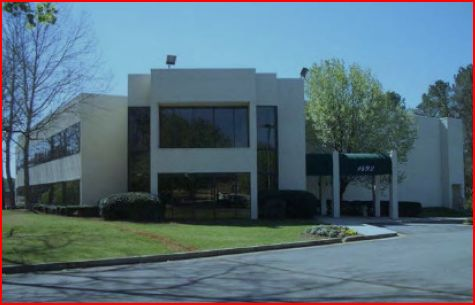
DeKalb Agriculture, Technology and Environment building

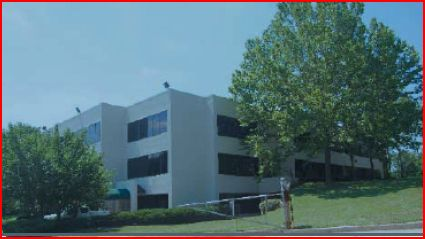

== Academics ==
The mission of the school is to give its students a background in technology and study of the environment by engaging in environmental projects. Technology supports all core learning areas. The special area classes that all students participate in are technology, band (if chosen), art, French, health, music, environmental science, and physical education. The school has a special Discovery Gifted Program for those who have been identified as gifted by DeKalb County School District and Georgia Department of Education standards.

The school's music program features a band structured into three distinct tiers: beginner, intermediate, and advanced, catering to students from 5th to 8th grade. This band actively participates in a variety of events, including parades, live performances, and competitive events. Notably, on April 25, 2009, the band achieved a commendable second-place finish in a regional band competition.

Specialized academic programs include the full implementation of all Common Core Standards with the addition of FOSS science and Everyday Mathematics curriculums.

== Clubs, organizations, and extracurricular activities ==
The school's clubs include the National Beta Club (Junior Beta), Technology Club, and Girl Scouts of the USA (Brownies, Daisies and Juniors), Robotics, Green Team, STEAM Team, Broadcasting, Yearbook, Little Miss Sunshine, Performing Arts, and Boy Scouts of America 1833 (Boy Scouts and Cub scouts - tiger cub and junior cub). Since 2007, the school has participated in an Atlanta area sports program which includes basketball, flag football, Track and field, Kilometer Kids, and Cheerleading, which are all co-ed. Students must maintain a grade-point average of at least 3.0 to participate.
