= The Bigger Artist =

Studio album by A Boogie wit da Hoodie
- Released: September 29, 2017
- Recorded: 2017
- Genres: Hip-hop; trap
- Length: 51:35
- Labels: Highbridge; Atlantic
- Producers: Cardo; DJ Mustard; Diego Ave; Dudley Exantus; Illmind; Jahaan Sweet; Jamz; Murda Beatz; Metro Boomin; Myster Whyte; Nav; Ness; Nick Seeley; Quasi; Scott Storch; Southside; Traksterz; Young Troy

A Boogie wit da Hoodie chronology
The Bigger Artist (2017)	International Artist (2018)

Singles from The Bigger Artist
- 1. "Drowning" Released: March 10, 2017; 2. "Say A'" Released: September 22, 2017

Professional ratings
Review scores
Source	Rating
HipHopDX	3.3/5
Pitchfork	7/10

The Bigger Artist is the debut studio album by American rapper A Boogie wit da Hoodie. It was released on September 29, 2017, by Highbridge and Atlantic Records, serving as the second commercial release with Atlantic. The album features guest appearances from Chris Brown, Trey Songz, Kodak Black, 21 Savage, PnB Rock, YoungBoy Never Broke Again, Robin Thicke and Don Q. Meanwhile, production comes from Metro Boomin, DJ Mustard, Murda Beatz, and Cardo, among others. The album received widespread acclaim from critics, who praised A Boogie's ability to blend melody with introspective lyricism.

== Background ==
The album was announced on July 17, 2017. The album's cover art was revealed on September 3, 2017. The tracklist and pre-order was released on September 8, 2017.

== Singles ==
The lead single, "Drowning" featuring Kodak Black, was released on March 10, 2017. "Beast Mode" featuring PnB Rock and YoungBoy Never Broke Again, was released as a pre-order single on September 8, 2017. The second and final single, "Say A'", was released on September 22, 2017.

== Critical reception ==
The Bigger Artist received widespread critical acclaim. Pitchfork highlighted the album's blend of melody and grit, noting that A Boogie's ability to transform vulnerable moments into catchy sing-alongs was a standout feature . XXL Magazine commended the album's emotional depth, particularly on tracks like "No Comparison," where A Boogie delivers a brooding performance over solemn production . HipHopDX acknowledged the album's success in showcasing A Boogie's strengths, especially with the platinum-selling single "Drowning" featuring Kodak Black.

== Commercial performance ==
The Bigger Artist debuted at number four on the US Billboard 200 with 67,000 album-equivalent units, of which 10,000 were in pure album sales in its first week of release. It is A Boogie wit da Hoodie's third work to appear on the chart, and his highest-peaking after Hoodie SZN. On August 21, 2019, the album was certified platinum by the Recording Industry Association of America (RIAA) for combined sales and album-equivalent units of over a million units in the United States.

== Track listing ==
No.	Title	Writer(s)	Producer(s)	Length
1.	"No Promises"	Artist Dubose; Ronald LaTour	Cardo	3:17
2.	"Undefeated" (featuring 21 Savage)	Dubose; Shayaa Abraham-Joseph; Shane Lindstrom; Ramon Ibanga, Jr.	Illmind; Murda Beatz	2:54
3.	"Drowning" (featuring Kodak Black)	Dubose; Dieuson Octave; Jahaan Sweet; Ray Nelson	Quasi; Jahaan Sweet	3:29
4.	"Say A'"	Dubose; Courtney Clayburn; Nick Seeley	Ness; Nick Seeley	3:34
5.	"No Comparison"	Dubose; Leland Wayne	Metro Boomin	4:04
6.	"Unhappy"	Dubose; Scott Storch; Diego Avendaño	Scott Storch; Diego Ave^{[a]}	2:59
7.	"Let's Start Over"	Dubose; Darling Hernandez	Jamz	3:37
8.	"Get to You"	Dubose; Wayne; Joshua Luellen; Navraj Goraya	Metro Boomin; Southside^{[a]}; Nav^{[a]}	3:26
9.	"Somebody" (featuring Don Q)	Dubose; Le'Quincy Anderson; Dijon McFarlane	Mustard	2:58
10.	"Money Sprung" (featuring Don Q)	Dubose; Anderson; Hernandez	Jamz	3:15
11.	"If I Gotta Go"	Dubose; Hernandez	Jamz	3:23
12.	"Fucking & Kissing" (featuring Chris Brown)	Dubose; Christopher Brown; John Hyszko	Young Troy	2:51
13.	"Bad Girl" (featuring Trey Songz and Robin Thicke)	Dubose; Tremaine Neverson; Robin Thicke; Fred Jackson	Myster Whyte; Traksterz	3:49
14.	"Stalking You"	Dubose; Jackson	Dudley Exantus; Traksterz	3:41
15.	"Beast Mode" (featuring PnB Rock and YoungBoy Never Broke Again)	Dubose; Rakim Allen; Kentrell Gaulden; Hyszko	Young Troy	4:18
Total length:				51:35

Notes

- ^{^[a]} signifies a co-producer

Sample credits

- "Bad Girl" contains an interpolation from "Teach U a Lesson", performed by Robin Thicke.
- "Get to You" contains an interpolation from "Ex-Factor", performed by Lauryn Hill.
- "Stalking You" contains an interpolation from "This Love", performed by Maroon 5.

== Charts ==
=== Weekly charts ===
Chart (2017)	Peak position
Canadian Albums (Billboard)	10
New Zealand Heatseeker Albums (RMNZ)	9
US Billboard 200	4
US Top R&B/Hip-Hop Albums (Billboard)	1

=== Year-end charts ===
Chart (2017)	Position
US Billboard 200	171
US Top R&B/Hip-Hop Albums (Billboard)	55
Chart (2018)	Position
US Billboard 200	100
US Top R&B/Hip-Hop Albums (Billboard)	47

== Certifications ==
Region	Certification	Certified units/sales
Canada (Music Canada)	Platinum	80,000^{‡}
New Zealand (RMNZ)	Gold	7,500^{‡}
United States (RIAA)	2× Platinum	2,000,000^{‡}
^{‡} Sales+streaming figures based on certification alone.
