= Better Off Alone (album) =

Studio album by A Boogie wit da Hoodie
- Released: May 17, 2024
- Recorded: 2023–2024
- Length: 57:42
- Labels: Atlantic; Highbridge
- Producers: 254Bodi; AJ Ruined My Record; Andyr; ATL Jacob; AyoPeeb; Bobby Raps; CashMoneyAP; Crater; Cutz; Daniel Moras; Deezy Beats; Dez Wright; DJ Bandz; Doc McKinney; DY Krazy; FnZ; Fridayy; Gabe Lucas; Harper; Haze; Hendrix Smoke; Hitmaka; JoeFromYO; London on da Track; Luca Beats; Magic; Musik MajorX; Nico Baran; Nuki; Philip Cornish; ProdByReid; Prod. JPBeatz; Qriley; Sam Jackson Willows; Scott Storch; S.Dot; Sean Momberger; Sebastian Lopez; Tariq Beats; T Kee; Tone Deaf; TrePounds; Tsurreal; Zaytoven

A Boogie wit da Hoodie chronology
Alone (2024)	Better Off Alone (2024)	Better Off Alone 2 (TBA)

Singles from Better Off Alone
- 1. "Steppas" Released: March 29, 2024

Better Off Alone is the fifth studio album by American rapper A Boogie wit da Hoodie. It was released on May 17, 2024, through Atlantic Records and Highbridge. The album features guest appearances from Young Thug, Cash Cobain, Future, Lil Durk, Fridayy and Mariah the Scientist.

== Promotion ==
A Boogie wit da Hoodie announced the album on January 29, 2024, accompanying a new world tour, named likewise with a release date set for May 17, 2024. The world tour started on April 10, 2024, in Auckland, New Zealand, and then moved into other Australian and New Zealand arenas, before heading to Europe, and after to the United States.

The promotional EP Alone was released on April 22, 2024.

== Critical reception ==
HotNewHipHop describes the album as a "reflective look at the dualities of fame and the cost of artistic expression," noting A Boogie's more mature and contemplative approach. Ratings Game Music highlights the track "Spotlight," featuring Lil Durk, as a standout, praising the duo's chemistry and the song's feel-good production. Rap Radar emphasizes the album's introspective nature, with A Boogie taking time to himself and delivering a more personal narrative through its 21 tracks. On Album of The Year, user reviews reflect a positive reception, with many praising the album's consistency and A Boogie's lyrical growth. One user notes, "The first 8 songs of the album gave me some hope for the rest of the listen... Dark King is a new classic for A Boogie overall."

== Commercial performance ==
The album became A Boogie's least commercially successful album selling 26,000 copies in its first week to debut at number 18 on the Billboard 200 chart. The album dropped to number 82 in its second week and dropped to number 190 in its third week. The album exited the chart entirely in its fourth week.

== Track listing ==
Better Off Alone track listing
No.	Title	Writer(s)	Producer(s)	Length
1.	"Better Off Alone"	Artist Dubose; Arthur Putman; Tyler Kee; Oriel Bitton; Moises Marin; Jordan Holt-May	AJ Ruined My Record; T Kee; Bitton on the Beat; Biirthplace	2:19
2.	"Dark King"	Dubose; Sebastian Lopez; Reid Taylor; Troy Wall	Sebastian Lopez; ProdByReid; Yachti	3:19
3.	"Let's Go Away" (featuring Young Thug)	Dubose; Jeffery Williams; Martin McKinney; Sam Willows; Adrien Gough; Joseph Salusbury	Doc McKinney; Sam Jackson Willows	2:21
4.	"Body" (featuring Cash Cobain)	Dubose; Cashmere Small; Corey Nutile; Luca Fano-Caroti; Nicolas Baran; Jaucquez Lowe	Cutz; Luca Beats; Nico Baran	3:12
5.	"Somebody" (featuring Future)	Dubose; Nayvadius Cash; Robert Richardson; Dwan Avery; Jeffrey LaCroix; Le'Quincy Anderson; Holt-May	Bobby Raps; DY Krazy; TrePounds	3:33
6.	"Steppas"	Dubose; London Holmes; Alex Petit; Daniel Raab; Dylan Clearly-Kell; Antonio Williams; Martell Smith-Williams; Holt-May	London on da Track; CashMoneyAP; Daniel Moras; Dez Wright; Tone Deaf	3:21
7.	"Headaches"	Dubose; Jengis Rahmanoski; Cleary-Krell; Harper Gordon; Joseph Zoumboulias	Chuck Taylor; Dez Wright; Harper; JoeFromYO	1:59
8.	"Spotlight" (featuring Lil Durk)	Dubose; Durk Banks; Holmes; Dinero	London on da Track; Dinero	2:58
9.	"Need You Around" (featuring Fridayy)	Dubose; Francis Leblanc; Shaun Thomas; Manuel Seal; Raymond Usher; Jermain Maudlin; Holt-May	Fridayy; S.Dot	2:53
10.	"One Shot"	Dubose; Holmes; Mateen Niknam; Joshua Hui; Philipp Lindworksy; Konstatinos Latos; Marshall Mathers; Jeff Bass; Luis Resto; Holt-May	London on da Track; AyoPeeb; Vitals; Phil; Nuki Beats	2:21
11.	"They Shooting"	Dubose; Andrej Marko; Devonte Richmond; Demetrius Bell; Salaam Remi; Nasir Jones; Jeremiah Lordan; Dwayne Carter. Jr; Marcus Boyd; LaMar Seymour; LaNelle Seymour; Jermaine Preyan; Noel Fisher; Rick Cunningham; Bryan Williams	Andyr; DJ Bandz; Magic	2:54
12.	"Feel Like Dying"	Dubose; Christian Ward; Altariq Crapps; Christopher Dotson; Quinton Lamar Cook; Holt-May	Hitmaka; Tariq Beats; Musik MajorX; Q Riley	2:51
13.	"P&E" (featuring Mariah the Scientist)	Dubose; Mariah Buckles; Holmes; Michael Mulé; Isaac De Boni; Scott Storch; Hui; Philip Cornish; Jeffrey Atkins; Seven Aurelius; Tiffany Lane; Irving Lorenzo; Holt-May	London on da Track; FnZ; Scott Storch; Vitals; Phil	2:30
14.	"Tiffanys"	Dubose; LeBlanc; Jacob Canady; Derrick Miller; Ethan Hayes	Fridayy; ATL Jacob; Hendrix Smoke; Haze	3:08
15.	"No More Questions"	Dubose; Nathaniel Kim; Alvin Velasco; Rakim Allen; Brandon Bell	Crater; Tsurreal	3:18
16.	"How to Love"	Dubose; Rahmanoski; Zoumboulias; Ian Viitala Jacobsen; Oliver Larsson	Chuck Taylor; JoeFromYO; JPBeatz	1:51
17.	"D.T.N."	Dubose; Thomas	S.Dot	2:46
18.	"Did Me Wrong"	Dubose; Thomas; Isaac Hayes; Anderson	S.Dot; 254Bodi	2:57
19.	"Her Birthday"	Dubose; Holmes; Sean Momberger; Williams; Brandon Casey; Brian Casey; Bryan-Michael Cox; Kevin Hicks; Holt-May	London on da Track; Sean Momberger; Philip Cornish; Tone Deaf	2:34
20.	"Booby Trap"	Dubose; Holmes; Xavier Dotson; Williams; Holt-May	London on da Track; Zaytoven; Deezy Beats; Tone Deaf	2:16
21.	"I Already Know"	Dubose; Thomas; Kim; Luka Berman	S.Dot; Crater; Gabe Lucas	2:21
Total length:				57:42

== Personnel ==
- A Boogie wit da Hoodie – vocals
- Joe LaPorta – mastering
- AJ Ruined My Record – mixing (tracks 1, 2, 4, 5, 7, 9–12, 14–17, 21), recording (1, 3, 5, 6, 9, 12, 21), vocal mixing (6, 13)
- Bainz – mixing (tracks 3, 6, 8, 13), immersive mixing (1–18, 21)
- Alex Estevez – mixing (tracks 18–20), recording (2, 3, 6–11, 13–16, 18–20)
- Anthony "Keys" Villena – recording (tracks 1, 2, 4–6, 9–11, 13, 14)
- Moustafa Moustafa – recording (track 4)
- Eric Manco – recording (track 5)
- Bobby Regeiro – recording (track 18)
- Johnny Ayoub – recording (track 18)
- James Dunn – recording (19, 20)
- Michael "Mackey" Dietrick – recording (track 21)
- Aresh Banaji – mixing assistance (tracks 3, 6, 8, 13, 19)
- Jenso Plymouth – mixing assistance (tracks 6, 13)
- Fridayy – background vocals (track 14)
- Gabe Lucas – background vocals (track 21)

== Charts ==
Chart performance for Better Off Alone
Chart (2024)	Peak position
Australian Albums (ARIA)	53
Australian Hip Hop/R&B Albums (ARIA)	11
Canadian Albums (Billboard)	42
Belgian Albums (Ultratop Flanders)	157
Dutch Albums (Album Top 100)	65
UK Albums (Official Charts)	72
US Billboard 200	18
US Top R&B/Hip-Hop Albums (Billboard)	5
