= Swervin =

2019 single by A Boogie wit da Hoodie

Single by A Boogie wit da Hoodie (solo or featuring 6ix9ine or Veysel)

from the album Hoodie SZN
- Released: July 2, 2019
- Genre: Hip hop
- Length: 3:08
- Label: Highbridge; Atlantic
- Songwriters: Artist Julius Dubose; Aubrey Robinson; Daniel Hernandez; Kevin Richardson; London Holmes; Roark Bailey
- Producer: London on da Track

A Boogie wit da Hoodie singles chronology
"Young Grizzly World" (2019)	"Swervin" (2019)	"Big Rich Town (Power Remix)" (2019)

6ix9ine singles chronology
"Tsunami" (2019)	"Swervin" (2019)	"Gooba" (2020)

Music video
- "Swervin" on YouTube

"Swervin" is a song by American rapper and singer A Boogie wit da Hoodie featuring fellow American rapper 6ix9ine from the former's second studio album Hoodie SZN, released on December 21, 2018. The song was written by the artists alongside Aubrey Robinson, Kevin Richardson, Roark Bailey, and producer London on da Track. The song was released as the album's second single along with an official video on July 2, 2019, omitting 6ix9ine and his verse. In the German-language states, "Swervin" was re-released with German rapper Veysel on July 26, 2019.

== Music video ==
The song's official video was released on July 2, 2019. 6ix9ine does not appear in the video, nor does his verse.

=== Synopsis ===
The video opens with A Boogie trapped on an airplane that just blew its engine. From there, the visual switches to him interacting with the female lead and cuts to various other scenes. Complex found similarities between Destiny's Child's "Say My Name" video and noted that the video's scenes "are spliced together in a way that follows the trajectory of A Boogie's lyrics".

== Chart performance ==
"Swervin" peaked the highest in Belgium, where it reached number 19. The second highest peak was in Canada, where it peaked at number 24. The song was certified Platinum in Canada by Music Canada on March 5, 2019 and certified 6× Platinum in the United States by the RIAA for selling more than 6,000,000 copies on June 8, 2023.

== Charts ==
=== Weekly charts ===
Chart (2018–2019)	Peak position
Australia (ARIA)	41
Belgium (Ultratip Bubbling Under Flanders)	19
Canada Hot 100 (Billboard)	24
Czech Republic Singles Digital (ČNS IFPI)	72
Germany (GfK)	73
Lithuania (AGATA)	30
New Zealand Hot Singles (RMNZ)	21
Portugal (AFP)	86
Slovakia Singles Digital (ČNS IFPI)	49
Sweden (Sverigetopplistan)	83
Switzerland (Schweizer Hitparade)	95
UK Singles (Official Charts)	27
US Billboard Hot 100	38
US Hot R&B/Hip-Hop Songs (Billboard)	16
US R&B/Hip-Hop Airplay (Billboard)	38
US Rolling Stone Top 100	47

=== Year-end charts ===
Chart (2019)	Position
Canada (Canadian Hot 100)	50
UK Singles (Official Charts Company)	86
US Billboard Hot 100	82
US Hot R&B/Hip-Hop Songs (Billboard)	37
US Rolling Stone Top 100	24

== Certifications ==
Region	Certification	Certified units/sales
Australia (ARIA)	Platinum	70,000^{‡}
Austria (IFPI Austria)	Platinum	30,000^{‡}
Canada (Music Canada)	8× Platinum	640,000^{‡}
Denmark (IFPI Danmark)	Platinum	90,000^{‡}
Germany (BVMI)	Gold	200,000^{‡}
New Zealand (RMNZ)	2× Platinum	60,000^{‡}
Portugal (AFP)	Platinum	10,000^{‡}
United Kingdom (BPI)	Platinum	600,000^{‡}
United States (RIAA)	6× Platinum	6,000,000^{‡}
^{‡} Sales+streaming figures based on certification alone.
