= Jungle (A Boogie wit da Hoodie song) =

2016 single by A Boogie wit da Hoodie

Single by A Boogie wit da Hoodie

from the album Artist
- Released: 2016
- Genre: East Coast Hip Hop
- Length: 2:54
- Label: Highbridge; Atlantic
- Songwriters: Artist Dubose; Daris Meachem
- Producer: D Stackz

A Boogie wit da Hoodie singles chronology
"My Shit" (2016)	"Jungle" (2016)	"Timeless" (2016)

Music video
- "Jungle" on YouTube

"Jungle" is a song by American rapper A Boogie wit da Hoodie. It is a single from his debut mixtape Artist (2016), and was produced by D Stackz.

== Composition ==
The song centers on A Boogie wit da Hoodie's life growing up in the neighborhood of Highbridge, Bronx, which he deems a "jungle", and his rise to success as a rapper.

== Music video ==
In the music video, A Boogie loses a friend to gun violence. He and his crew catch up with the shooter to "enact some street justice".

== Charts ==
Chart (2016–2017)	Peak position
US Bubbling Under Hot 100 (Billboard)	7
US Hot R&B/Hip-Hop Songs (Billboard)	46

== Certifications ==
Region	Certification	Certified units/sales
Canada (Music Canada)	3× Platinum	240,000^{‡}
New Zealand (RMNZ)	Gold	15,000^{‡}
United Kingdom (BPI)	Platinum	600,000^{‡}
United States (RIAA)	5× Platinum	5,000,000^{‡}
^{‡} Sales+streaming figures based on certification alone.
