= Troy Johnson (singer) =

American gospel and soul singer

- Origin: United States
- Genres: Gospel, soul, new jack swing
- Instrument: Vocals
- Years active: 1984–present

Troy Kent Johnson is an American gospel and soul singer. He got his first break with a track on the Blame It on Rio soundtrack in 1984, and signed to Motown Records, where he released his first album. He scored a hit in 1986 with "It's You", which peaked at number 65 on Billboard's Hot R&B Singles chart. After a religious conversion, Johnson began recording gospel music. He put his career on hiatus in the late 1990s to focus on spiritual matters, but returned with his own label, SA Entertainment, on which he has released his most recent, secular album, which featured a new version of "It's You", again charting, this time peaking at number 40 on Billboard's Adult Contemporary chart in 2005.

== Discography ==
- Getting a Grip on Love (Motown, 1986)
- The Way It Is (RCA, 1989) - #87 U.S. R&B/Hip Hop Albums
- Plain and Simple (Word, 1993)
- I Will (Word, 1998)
- Troy Johnson (Sought After Entertainment, 2005)
