= Timeless (A Boogie wit da Hoodie song) =

2016 single by A Boogie wit da Hoodie

Single by A Boogie wit da Hoodie featuring DJ SpinKing

from the EP TBA
- Released: October 28, 2016
- Length: 3:04
- Label: Highbridge; Atlantic
- Songwriter(s): Artist Dubose; Gibran Jairam; Jake Aujla; Christopher Washington; Joseph Venuti
- Producer(s): DJ SpinKing; Jaegen; C.P Dubb; Arnold of Mod

A Boogie wit da Hoodie singles chronology
"Side Nigga" (2016)	"Timeless" (2016)	"Know Shit!" (2016)

Music video
- "Timeless" on YouTube

"Timeless" is a song by American rapper A Boogie wit da Hoodie, released on October 28, 2016, from his EP TBA as the lead single. It features DJ SpinKing, who produced the song with Jaegen, C.P Dubb and Arnold of Mod. The song contains samples of "Where I Wanna Be" by Donell Jones and "Wasted" by Gucci Mane featuring Plies.

== Background and composition ==
The style of the song has been described as "more R&B than rap". The lyrics are about how A Boogie wit da Hoodie cannot afford to waste his time. In an interview with Genius, he detailed the meaning behind the song: "It hurts to say it, but I barely got time for the family right now because I'm on the road right now. All these shows. I got to still do all these songs. Got another album to make. Mad shit going on. That's why I put that in. This life is crazy right now. The fast life is just ridiculous."

== Music video ==
The music video was released alongside the single. It sees A Boogie hanging out with a group of friends and walking around New York City.

== Charts ==
Chart (2016–2017)	Peak position
US Billboard Hot 100	86
US Hot R&B/Hip-Hop Songs (Billboard)	36

== Certifications ==
Region	Certification	Certified units/sales
Canada (Music Canada)	Platinum	80,000^{‡}
United States (RIAA)	Platinum	1,000,000^{‡}
^{‡} Sales+streaming figures based on certification alone.
