= Say A' =

2017 single by A Boogie wit da Hoodie

Single by A Boogie wit da Hoodie

from the album The Bigger Artist
- Released: September 22, 2017
- Genre: Trap
- Length: 3:34
- Label: Highbridge; Atlantic
- Songwriters: Artist Dubose; Courtney Clyburn; Nick Seeley
- Producers: Ness; Seeley

A Boogie wit da Hoodie singles chronology
"Beast Mode" (2017)	"Say A'" (2017)	"Keke" (2018)

Music video
- "Say A'" on YouTube

"Say A'" is a song by American rapper A Boogie wit da Hoodie from his debut studio album The Bigger Artist (2017). It was released on September 22, 2017 as the album's second single. The song was produced by Ness and Nick Seeley.

== Composition ==
Kevin Goddard of HotNewHipHop called the song a "light-hearted, catchy street banger". Produced by in-house producer Ness, a label mate of A Boogie wit da Hoodie, the instrumental has a "cheerful" piano loop with "trap drums" playing which appears to be sampled from "Tempest Towers" from the Nintendo game Kirby's Epic Yarn, along with a faint sound of police siren. A Boogie sings about his experiences of life in the streets and being stopped by police, and what his newfound success has to offer him.

== Music video ==
Directed by Michael Garcia, the accompanying music video was released on January 5, 2018. It begins with A Boogie wit da Hoodie in an argument with a woman before noticing that police have spotted him. He hops into his Mercedes-Benz, which transforms into a Ferrari, with a female model by his side. The visual then alternates between animated and live-action shots, showing the pursuit, which is being televised. Boogie stops his car and leaves the model inside, and makes his way to a staircase and onto a rooftop. He eventually outruns the police, and on his way downstairs, he sees a couple of kids who were watching him on the news the entire time.

== Charts ==
Chart (2017)	Peak position
US Billboard Hot 100	75
US Hot R&B/Hip-Hop Songs (Billboard)	33

== Certifications ==
Region	Certification	Certified units/sales
Canada (Music Canada)	Platinum	80,000^{‡}
United States (RIAA)	2× Platinum	2,000,000^{‡}
^{‡} Sales+streaming figures based on certification alone.
