= Part of Me (A Boogie wit da Hoodie song) =

2025 single by A Boogie wit da Hoodie

Single by A Boogie wit da Hoodie
- Released: October 10, 2025
- Genre: Pop rap
- Length: 2:47
- Label: Highbridge; Atlantic
- Songwriters: Artist Dubose; Joshua Moreau; Tyler Gabriele; Luca Fano-Caroti; Bobby Womack; Mariah Carey; Jermaine Mauldin; Manuel Seal; Johntá Austin; Kenneth Edmonds; Darnell Bristol; Sid Johnson; Bobby Womack; Patrick Moten; Sandra Sully
- Producers: Moreau; Abstrakt; Luca Beats

A Boogie wit da Hoodie singles chronology
"Whatever For You (Remix)" (2025)	"Part of Me" (2025)

"Part of Me" is a song by American rapper A Boogie wit da Hoodie, released on October 10, 2025. Produced by Joshua Moreau, Abstrakt and Luca Beats, it contains an interpolation of "We Belong Together" by Mariah Carey.

== Composition ==
"Part of Me" is a melodic rap song that finds A Boogie wit da Hoodie conveying his vulnerable state and internal conflict, as he reflects on a lost relationship. He describes struggling to move on as he still feels attached to his ex-girlfriend. Over a "mellow and echoey" minimal beat with synths, A Boogie delivers soft-spoken, crooning vocals, alongside some confident boasts.

== Critical reception ==
Armon Sadler of Vibe gave a positive review, writing "Boogie may not be the white hot act he was from 2016-2020, but a song like this is the ideal launchpad to roll out a forthcoming LP and get right back into the conversation. This is perfect as the temperature drops and the desire for that old thing back increases. This song link will be sent to many men and women over the next few months."

== Charts ==
Chart performance for "Part of Me"
Chart (2025)	Peak position
Canada Hot 100 (Billboard)	52
New Zealand Hot Singles (RMNZ)	11
UK Singles (OCC)	57
US Billboard Hot 100	66
US Hot R&B/Hip-Hop Songs (Billboard)	12
US Rhythmic Airplay (Billboard)	37
