= My Shit (A Boogie wit da Hoodie song) =

Single by A Boogie wit da Hoodie

from the album Artist
- Released: July 1, 2016
- Recorded: 2016
- Genre: East Coast Hip hop
- Length: 2:08
- Label: Highbridge; Atlantic
- Songwriter(s): Artist Dubose; Daris Jaquon Meachem
- Producer(s): D Stackz

A Boogie wit da Hoodie singles chronology
"Bando" (2016)	"My Shit" (2016)	"Jungle" (2016)

"My Shit" (also known as "My Shhh" or "My S***" on the clean versions) is a song by American rapper A Boogie wit da Hoodie, taken from his first full-length project, a mixtape titled Artist. The song was released as a single via digital distribution on July 1, 2016. The song peaked at number 86 on the Billboard Hot 100. The song was used in the Rick and Morty episode "The Old Man and The Seat".

== Chart performance ==
The single debuted at number 98 on the US Billboard Hot 100 chart on the week of November 5, 2016. It eventually peaked at number 86 twelve weeks later. The song is certified 4× Platinum by the Recording Industry Association of America (RIAA) for combined sales and streaming equivalent units of over 4 million units in the United States as of September 2023.

== Charts ==
Chart (2016–17)	Peak position
US Billboard Hot 100	86
US Hot R&B/Hip-Hop Songs (Billboard)	35

== Certifications ==
Region	Certification	Certified units/sales
Canada (Music Canada)	3× Platinum	240,000^{‡}
New Zealand (RMNZ)	Platinum	30,000^{‡}
United Kingdom (BPI)	Silver	200,000^{‡}
United States (RIAA)	4× Platinum	4,000,000^{‡}
^{‡} Sales+streaming figures based on certification alone.
