= Don Q (rapper) =

American rapper

- Born: Le'Quincy Anderson; April 28, 1990 (age 36); New York City, U.S.
- Genre: Hip hop
- Occupations: Rapper; songwriter
- Years active: 2006–present
- Labels: Highbridge The Label; Empire
- Website: donqhbtl.com

Le'Quincy Anderson (born April 28, 1990), better known by his stage name Don Q, is an American rapper. He is best known for his collaborations with labelmate A Boogie wit da Hoodie.

== Early life ==
Le'Quincy Anderson was born and raised in the Bronx in New York City. He began writing raps in the fifth grade but did not start taking rap seriously until high school, he first rapped in a booth at the age of 16. Don grew up listening to artists such as Cassidy, Fabolous, Jadakiss, Styles P, Lloyd Banks and Jay-Z.

As he got older he began battle rapping in the streets, parks, and different blocks which helped him build confidence. Don began battling because he was inspired by the Smack DVD series. Don's first stage name was Q da Don, he would then change it to Don Q, after the popular rum after seeing it on the shelves at local liquor stores. Don released his first mixtape at 17. The mixtape was in dedication to Andre "Pop" Davidson, a standout basketball player at John F. Kennedy High School who died. Pop was Don's best friend and the first person to co-sign Don's rapping talent. The mixtape, however, did not receive much traction outside of Highbridge. Don almost quit rapping losing motivation as he did not have money to pay for studio sessions. Don was still worried about continuing his school studies and the streets but he came to the conclusion that rap was going to be his way to a better life. He made appearances in the local battle circuit where he rapped for several leagues such as Battle On The Beat, Blue Collar Television and Come Up Groundz.

== Career ==
=== 2016: Career beginnings ===
In 2016, Don signed to Highbridge the Label, a label ran by friends Quincy "QP" Acheampong and Sambou "Bubba" Camara. He and A Boogie were the first artists signed to the label. He was heavily featured on the compilation, Highbridge the Label: The Takeover Vol. 1, which dropped on May 28, 2016. Don gained more notoriety after appearing on Funkmaster Flex's freestyle series on Hot 97, along with A Boogie wit da Hoodie who had become one of the most popular up and coming rappers in New York City. Don delivered an impressive freestyle over Nas' Oochie Wally. Soon, the songs Bando and Bag On Me, featuring Don Q began getting radio play in the Tri-State area. In July 2016, Highbridge the Label partnered with Atlantic Records. Don dropped his first official mixtape in August 2016. The mixtape titled Don Season was hosted by DJ Don Cannon. The mixtape has features from A Boogie, PnB Rock and Keir. In September 2016, he was featured on the BET Hip Hop Awards cypher alongside A Boogie wit da Hoodie, Russ, Kent Jones and Nick Grant. During the year, Don collaborated with artists like Meek Mill, Dave East, Fabolous, Young Scooter and PnB Rock among others.

=== 2017 ===
In 2017, Don dropped his second mixtape titled Corner Stories featuring Dave East, A Boogie, Jadakiss, Styles P, Zoey Dollaz, PnB Rock, Fabolous and Loso Loaded, he would later follow up with a remastered version titled Corner Stories Reloaded with extra songs adding one featuring Rowdy Rebel. Don is featured on A Boogie's debut album The Bigger Artist on the tracks "Somebody" and "Money Sprung". Don collaborated with Dominican recording artist Chimbala, on a track titled “Matalo”. Don Q released his mixtape Don Talk featuring Pusha T, Tee Grizzley and Desiigner.

=== 2018 ===
Don Q released his follow-up mixtape to Don Season titled Don Season 2 featuring G Herbo, Dave East, Lil Durk, Moneybagg Yo and more. The lead single for the project is titled "Yeah Yeah" and features A Boogie wit da Hoodie and 50 Cent and produced by Murda Beatz. Don Q closed out the year dropping a 6 song extended play titled Underrated. He was also featured on A-Boogie's Platinum album, Hoodie SZN on a collaboration titled "Bosses and Workers" with fellow labelmate Trap Manny.

=== 2019 ===
To start off 2019, Don responded to Tory Lanez's battle challenge. Lanez had engaged in a battle with Joyner Lucas and had proclaimed himself the best rapper alive. Don proclaimed that Tory could not be the best rapper alive as he accused him of stealing lyrics from his Hot 97 freestyle. After a brief exchange of words via social media, Don released a diss track titled, "I'm Not Joyner." Lanez responded with his own diss entitled "Don Queen". The following day, Don Q retaliated with another diss track, called "This Is Ya King?"

Don Q was one of 5 rappers banned from New York City's Rolling Loud festival due to safety concerns by the NYPD.

=== 2020 ===
Don Q returned to music in 2020 by releasing "Flood My Wrist" featuring Lil Uzi Vert and A Boogie wit da Hoodie on July 1, 2020. He went on to release "I'm the One" a week later, and "Blood Sweat & Tears" on July 24. Another A Boogie-collaboration, "Vroom Vroom", was released on September 2, 2020. Don Q also collaborated on a track titled “Legends” with Buffalo MC, Benny the Butcher.

=== 2021 ===
After a long hiatus, having not dropped an official project in 3 years, Don Q made his departure from Atlantic Records and signed a new record deal with record label EMPIRE. Don Q released mixtape called 'Double or Nothing' on October 22, 2021, featuring a song with Bronx drill rapper B-Lovee. Don Q cited label issues saying he felt like a low priority, leading to major release delays, uncleared tracks, and multi-year gaps between projects. He also mentioned family issues Serious family challenges—including his mother's illness and caring for his daughter—required him to relocate and spend extended time away in Atlanta instead of focusing on recording. The COVID-19 pandemic further delayed his planned rollout schedules and music returns around 2020. He eventually moved away from the major label bottleneck by signing with Empire, allowing him more ownership and freedom over his masters and future releases.

=== 2022 ===
In 2022, Don Q released his fourth official mixtape titled “Corleone”. The mixtape featured Detroit-based rappers Icewear Vezzo and 42 Dugg, labelmate and frequent collaborator A Boogie wit da Hoodie, Dream Doll, G Herbo, Rowdy Rebel and Dusty Locane.

=== 2025 ===
Don Q took another long hiatus from music. In an April 2025 interview he admitted that he went through a phase of immense pressure to deliver radio-friendly, melodic records. Trying to force a commercial sound slowed down his natural creative output. During his hiatus, he realized that his core fanbase loves him most for his raw storytelling and punchlines, prompting him to reset and focus strictly on his signature style. In December he returned with his comeback extended play “From Dust to Don” featuring Goldie and Keen Streetz.

== Personal life ==
Don has one daughter.

In November 2017 Anderson was arrested for felony firearm possession in New York.

In January 2024 Anderson was arrested in New York for evading nearly $20,000 in vehicle tolls.

== Discography ==
=== Commercial mixtapes ===
Title	Album details	Peak chart positions	
Title	Album details	US	US R&B/HH
Don Season	Released: August 12, 2016; Label: Highbridge, Atlantic; Format: Digital download, streaming	—	—
Don Season 2	Released: August 31, 2018; Label: Highbridge, Atlantic; Format: Digital download, streaming	93	46
Double Or Nothing	Released: October 22, 2021; Label: Highbridge, Empire; Format: Digital download, streaming	—	—
Corleone	Released: June 24, 2022; Label: Highbridge, Empire; Format: Digital download, streaming	—	—
"—" denotes a recording that did not chart or was not released in that territory.

=== Mixtapes ===
List of mixtapes, showing selected details
Title	Details
Highbridge The Label: The Takeover Vol. 1 (with A Boogie wit da Hoodie)	Released: May 18, 2016; Label: Highbridge, Atlantic; Format: Digital download
Corner Stories	Released: February 27, 2017; Label: Highbridge, Atlantic; Format: Digital download
Highbridge The Label: Vol. 2 (with Highbridge The Label)	Released: TBD 2021; Label: Highbridge, Atlantic; Format: TBD

=== Extended plays ===
List of extended plays, with selected details
Title	Details
Don Talk	Released: March 23, 2017; Label: Highbridge; Format: Digital download
Underrated	Released: December 8, 2018; Label: Highbridge; Format: Digital download

=== Singles ===
==== As lead artist ====
Title	Year	Peak chart positions		Album
Title	Year	US	NZ Hot	Album
"Cant Trust Em" (featuring PnB Rock, Lil Bibby & A Boogie wit da Hoodie)	2016	—	—	Non-album singles
"Its All Love" (featuring Dave East)	2016	—	—	Non-album singles
"Take Me Alive" (featuring Styles P & Jadakiss)	2016	—	—	Non-album singles
"All My Bitches"	2016	—	—	Non-album singles
"Game Winnerz" (with A Boogie wit da Hoodie)	2016	—	—	Highbridge the Label: The Takeover Vol. 1
"Bando" (with A Boogie wit da Hoodie)	2016	—	—	Highbridge the Label: The Takeover Vol. 1
"Bag on Me" (with A Boogie wit da Hoodie)	2016	—	—	Highbridge the Label: The Takeover Vol. 1
"Groupie Love"	2016	—	—	Highbridge the Label: The Takeover Vol. 1
"Trap Phone" (featuring Desiigner)	2017	—	—	Don Talk
"Yeah Yeah" (featuring A Boogie wit da Hoodie & 50 Cent)	2018	—	—	Don Season 2
"Roll My Weed" (featuring Jay Critch)	2018	—	—	Don Season 2
"Pull Up" (featuring G Herbo & Dave East)	2018	—	—	Don Season 2
"I'm Not Joyner"	2019	—	—	Non-album singles
"Make Me Wanna" (featuring A Boogie wit da Hoodie)	2019	—	—	Non-album singles
"Out of Line" (with Jay Critch)	2019	—	—	Non-album singles
"Flood My Wrist" (with A Boogie wit da Hoodie and Lil Uzi Vert)	2020	— (Note: "Flood My Wrist" did not enter the Billboard Hot 100, but peaked at number 9 on the Bubbling Under Hot 100 Singles chart.)	28	Highbridge the Label: The Takeover Vol. 2
"I'm the One"	2020	—	—	Highbridge the Label: The Takeover Vol. 2
"Blood Sweat & Tears"	2020	—	—	Highbridge the Label: The Takeover Vol. 2
"Vroom Vroom" (with A Boogie wit da Hoodie and Trap Manny)	2020	—	—	Highbridge the Label: The Takeover Vol. 2
"—" denotes a recording that did not chart or was not released in that territory.

=== As a featured artist ===
Title	Year	Peak chart positions		Album
Title	Year	US	NZ Hot	Album
"Money Sprung" (A Boogie wit da Hoodie featuring Don Q)	2017	—	—	The Bigger Artist
"Somebody"A Boogie wit da Hoodie featuring Don Q	2017	—	—	The Bigger Artist
"Bosses and Workers by A Boogie wit da Hoodie (featuring Don Q & Trap Manny)	2018	—	—	Hoodie SZN
"Hard To Kill" by Jdmilitant (featuring Don Q)	2021	—	—	Non-album single
"Came From Nothing" Jay Guawpo featuring Lil Tjay & Don Q	2019	—	—	Came From Nothing Pt.1
"Shoot" by Trap Manny featuring Don Q and Lil Durk	2021	—	—	In Trap We Trust
