= List of awards and nominations received by Cardi B =

Cardi B awards and nominations
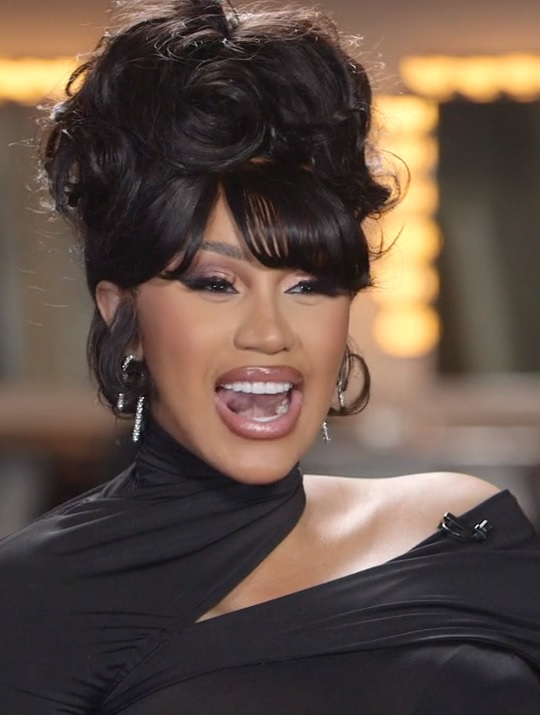
- Cardi B in 2021
Awards and nominations
Award	Wins	Nominations
American Music Awards	9	13
BET Awards	7	26
BET Hip Hop Awards	14	37
Billboard Latin Music Awards	1	4
Billboard Music Awards	8	34
Billboard Women in Music	1	1
Brit Awards	0	2
Global Awards	1	2
Grammy Awards	1	14
iHeartRadio Music Awards	4	25
Juno Awards	0	1
Latin American Music Awards	3	4
Lo Nuestro Awards	1	3
MOBO Awards	0	1
MTV Europe Music Awards	2	10
MTV Millennial Awards	2	5
MTV Movie & TV Awards	0	1
MTV Video Music Awards	4	24
NRJ Awards	1	3
Soul Train Music Awards	4	13
UK Music Video Awards	1	1

Totals (Note: Certain award groups do not simply award one winner. They acknowledge several different recipients, have runners-up, and have third place. Since this is a specific recognition and is different from losing an award, runner-up mentions are considered wins in this award tally. For simplification and to avoid errors, each award in this list has been presumed to have had a prior nomination.)
- Wins: 165
- Nominations: 277

American rapper Cardi B is the recipient of numerous awards, including a Grammy Award, nine American Music Awards, eight Billboard Music Awards, seven BET Awards, fourteen BET Hip Hop Awards, four iHeartRadio Music Awards, two MTV Europe Music Awards, four MTV Video Music Awards, four Soul Train Music Awards and a NRJ Music Award. She has also earned eight Guinness World Records during her career. Cardi B received the award for ASCAP Songwriter of the Year in 2019, the first time the accolade was presented to a female rapper. She received the honor for the second time in 2020, making her the first female songwriter to win the award twice. In 2020, Cardi became the first female rapper to be named Woman of the Year at the Billboard Women in Music Awards.

Cardi B received her first Grammy Award nominations at the 60th annual ceremony, with "Bodak Yellow" being nominated for Best Rap Song and Best Rap Performance. Her debut studio album Invasion of Privacy won Best Rap Album at the 61st annual ceremony, with Cardi becoming the first female rapper to win the category as a solo artist. It also received a nomination for Album of the Year, with "I Like It" being nominated for Record of the Year and "Be Careful" for Best Rap Performance. Additionally, her collaboration with Maroon 5 "Girls Like You" received a nomination for Best Pop Duo/Group Performance. Cardi became the third female rapper to be nominated for Album of the Year, following Lauryn Hill (1999) and Missy Elliott (2004). At the 62nd annual ceremony, her collaboration with Offset, "Clout", garnered her a nomination for Best Rap Performance. "Up" extended Cardi B's record as the female rapper with the most nominations in that category.

Cardi B has received two nominations for the Brit Award for International Female Solo Artist (2019 and 2021), joining Missy Elliott as the only female rappers to be nominated multiple times in that category. She has won three consecutive times both the Billboard Music Award for Top Rap Female Artist and the Bravo Otto for Hip Hop International. Invasion of Privacy won the BET Award for Album of the Year. She has received two nominations for the MTV Video Music Award for Video of the Year: "Finesse (remix)" (2018) and "WAP" (2021). She is the most awarded female rapper at the Billboard Music Awards, BET Hip Hop Awards, iHeartRadio Music Awards, and Guinness World Records.

== Awards and nominations ==
Award	Year (Note: Indicates the year of ceremony. Each year is linked to the article about the awards held that year, wherever possible.)	Recipient(s) and nominee(s)	Category	Result	Ref.
50/50innertainment Awards	2022	Cardi B	Top 50 Greatest Female Rappers of All Time	Won	
Afro X Digitals Awards	2021	Cardi B	International Act Of The Year	Won	
American Music Awards	2018	Herself	New Artist of the Year	Nominated	
American Music Awards	2018	Herself	Favorite Hip-Hop/Rap Artist	Won	
American Music Awards	2018	Herself	Favorite Female Artist — Pop/Rock	Nominated	
American Music Awards	2018	Herself	Favorite Social Artist	Nominated	
American Music Awards	2018	"Finesse" (with Bruno Mars)	Collaboration of the Year	Nominated	
American Music Awards	2018	"Finesse" (with Bruno Mars)	Favorite Song — Soul/R&B	Won	
American Music Awards	2018	"Bodak Yellow"	Favorite Song — Rap/Hip Hop	Won	
American Music Awards	2018	"Bodak Yellow"	Favorite Music Video	Nominated	
American Music Awards	2019	Herself	Favorite Artist — Rap/Hip Hop	Won	
American Music Awards	2020	"WAP" (featuring Megan Thee Stallion)	Favorite Song — Rap/Hip-Hop	Won	
American Music Awards	2020	"WAP" (featuring Megan Thee Stallion)	Collaboration of the Year	Nominated	
American Music Awards	2020	Herself	Favorite Female Artist — Rap/Hip-Hop	Nominated	
American Music Awards	2021	Herself	Favorite Female Artist — Rap/Hip-Hop	Nominated	
American Music Awards	2021	"Up"	Favorite Song— Rap/Hip-Hop	Won	
American Music Awards	2021	"Up"	Favorite Music Video	Nominated	
American Music Awards	2022	Herself	Favorite Female Artist — Rap/Hip-Hop	Nominated	
American Music Awards	2026	Herself	Best Female Hip-Hop Artist	Won	
American Music Awards	2026	"ErrTime"	Favorite Song — Rap/Hip Hop	Won	
American Music Awards	2026	Am I the Drama?	Album of the Year	Nominated	
American Music Awards	2026	Am I the Drama?	Best Hip-Hop Album	Won	
Apple Music Awards	2018	"I Like It"	Song of the Year	Won	
ASCAP Music Awards	2025	Herself	Voice of the Culture Award	Won	
ASCAP Pop Music Awards	2018	"Bodak Yellow"	Winning Songs	Won	
ASCAP Pop Music Awards	2019	"I Like It"	Winning Songs	Won	
ASCAP Pop Music Awards	2019	"Finesse"	Winning Songs	Won	
ASCAP Pop Music Awards	2019	"Girls Like You"	Winning Songs	Won	
ASCAP Pop Music Awards	2019	"No Limit"	Winning Songs	Won	
ASCAP Pop Music Awards	2020	"Please Me"	Winnings Songs	Won	
ASCAP Pop Music Awards	2022	"Up"	Winning Songs	Won	
ASCAP Pop Music Awards	2023	"Wild Side"	Winning Songs	Won	
ASCAP Rhythm & Soul Music Awards	2018	"Bodak Yellow"	Winning R&B/Hip-Hop Songs	Won	
ASCAP Rhythm & Soul Music Awards	2018	"Bodak Yellow"	Winning Rap Songs	Won	
ASCAP Rhythm & Soul Music Awards	2019	Herself	Songwriter of the Year	Won	
ASCAP Rhythm & Soul Music Awards	2019	"Be Careful"	Winning Songs	Won	
ASCAP Rhythm & Soul Music Awards	2019	"I Like It"	Winning Songs	Won	
ASCAP Rhythm & Soul Music Awards	2019	"MotorSport"	Winning Songs	Won	
ASCAP Rhythm & Soul Music Awards	2019	"No Limit"	Winning Songs	Won	
ASCAP Rhythm & Soul Music Awards	2019	"Bartier Cardi"	Winning Songs	Won	
ASCAP Rhythm & Soul Music Awards	2019	"Bodak Yellow"	Winning Songs	Won	
ASCAP Rhythm & Soul Music Awards	2019	"Finesse"	Winning Songs	Won	
ASCAP Rhythm & Soul Music Awards	2019	"Ring"	Winning Songs	Won	
ASCAP Rhythm & Soul Music Awards	2020	Herself	Songwriter of the Year	Won	
ASCAP Rhythm & Soul Music Awards	2020	"Thotiana (remix)"	Winning Songs	Won	
ASCAP Rhythm & Soul Music Awards	2020	"Backin' It Up"	Winning Songs	Won	
ASCAP Rhythm & Soul Music Awards	2020	"Please Me"	Winning Songs	Won	
ASCAP Rhythm & Soul Music Awards	2020	"Ring"	Winning Songs	Won	
ASCAP Rhythm & Soul Music Awards	2020	"Money"	Winning Songs	Won	
ASCAP Rhythm & Soul Music Awards	2020	"Press"	Winning Songs	Won	
ASCAP Rhythm & Soul Music Awards	2020	"Twerk"	Winning Songs	Won	
ASCAP Rhythm & Soul Music Awards	2020	"Clout"	Winning Songs	Won	
ASCAP Rhythm & Soul Music Awards	2021	"WAP"	Winning Songs	Won	
ASCAP Rhythm & Soul Music Awards	2022	"Up"	Winning Songs	Won	
ASCAP Rhythm & Soul Music Awards	2022	"Wild Side"	Winning Songs	Won	
ASCAP Rhythm & Soul Music Awards	2023	"Tomorrow 2"	Winning Songs	Won	
ASCAP Rhythm & Soul Music Awards	2024	"Put It on Da Floor Again"	Winning Songs	Won	
El Premio ASCAP	2019	"I Like It"	Song of the Year	Won	
El Premio ASCAP	2019	"La Modelo"	Winning Songs	Won	
El Premio ASCAP	2019	"Taki Taki"	Winning Songs	Won	
Angola VMAS	2020	"Yes"	Best International Video	Won	
BBC Radio 1's Teen Awards	2018	Herself	Most Entertaining Celeb	Won	
BET Awards	2017	Herself	Best New Artist	Nominated	
BET Awards	2017	Herself	Best Female Hip-Hop Artist	Nominated	
BET Awards	2018	Herself	Best Female Hip-Hop Artist	Won	
BET Awards	2018	"Bartier Cardi" (featuring 21 Savage)	Best Collaboration	Nominated	
BET Awards	2018	"Finesse" (with Bruno Mars)	Best Collaboration	Nominated	
BET Awards	2018	"Finesse" (with Bruno Mars)	Video of the Year	Nominated	
BET Awards	2018	"Bodak Yellow"	Video of the Year	Nominated	
BET Awards	2018	"Bodak Yellow"	Coca-Cola Viewers' Choice Award	Won	
BET Awards	2018	"MotorSport" (with Migos and Nicki Minaj)	Coca-Cola Viewers' Choice Award	Nominated	
BET Awards	2019	Herself	Best Female Hip-Hop Artist	Won	
BET Awards	2019	Invasion of Privacy	Album of the Year	Won	
BET Awards	2019	"Money"	Video of the Year	Nominated	
BET Awards	2019	"Please Me" (with Bruno Mars)	Video of the Year	Nominated	
BET Awards	2019	"Please Me" (with Bruno Mars)	Best Collaboration	Nominated	
BET Awards	2019	"I Like It" (featuring Bad Bunny and J Balvin)	Best Collaboration	Nominated	
BET Awards	2019	"I Like It" (featuring Bad Bunny and J Balvin)	Coca-Cola Viewers' Choice Award	Nominated	
BET Awards	2020	Herself	Best Female Hip-Hop Artist	Nominated	
BET Awards	2021	Herself	Best Female Hip-Hop Artist	Nominated	
BET Awards	2021	"Up"	Video of the Year	Nominated	
BET Awards	2021	"WAP" (with Megan Thee Stallion)	Video of the Year	Won	
BET Awards	2021	"WAP" (with Megan Thee Stallion)	Coca-Cola Viewers' Choice Award	Nominated	
BET Awards	2021	"WAP" (with Megan Thee Stallion)	Best Collaboration	Won	
BET Awards	2022	Herself	Best Female Hip-Hop Artist	Nominated	
BET Awards	2023	Herself	Best Female Hip-Hop Artist	Nominated	
BET Awards	2023	"Tomorrow 2" (with GloRilla)	Best Collaboration	Nominated	
BET Awards	2023	"Tomorrow 2" (with GloRilla)	Video of the Year	Nominated	
BET Awards	2024	Herself	Best Female Hip Hop Artist	Nominated	
BET Awards	2024	"Bongos" (with Megan Thee Stallion)	Best Collaboration	Nominated	
BET Awards	2024	"Bongos" (with Megan Thee Stallion)	Video of the Year	Nominated	
BET Awards	2025	Herself	Best Female Hip Hop Artist	Nominated	
BET Awards	2026	Am I the Drama?	Album of the Year	Nominated	
BET Awards	2026	"Outside"	Viewers' Choice Award	Nominated	
BET Awards	2026	"ErrTime" (with Jeezy and Latto)	Best Collaboration	Nominated	
BET Awards	2026	Herself	Best Female Hip Hop Artist	Won	
BET Awards	2026	Herself (with Patience Foster)	Video Director of the Year	Nominated	
BET Awards	2026	Herself	Fashion Vanguard Award	Nominated	
BET Hip Hop Awards	2017	Herself	Hot Ticket Performer	Nominated	
BET Hip Hop Awards	2017	Herself	MVP of the Year	Nominated	
BET Hip Hop Awards	2017	Herself	Best New Hip-Hop Artist	Won	
BET Hip Hop Awards	2017	Herself	Made-You-Look Award (Best Hip-Hop Style)	Won	
BET Hip Hop Awards	2017	Herself	Hustler of the Year	Won	
BET Hip Hop Awards	2017	"Bodak Yellow"	Best Hip-Hop Video	Nominated	
BET Hip Hop Awards	2017	"Bodak Yellow"	Single of the Year	Won	
BET Hip Hop Awards	2017	"Bodak Yellow"	Impact Track	Nominated	
BET Hip Hop Awards	2017	Gangsta Bitch Music, Vol. 2	Best Mixtape	Won	
BET Hip Hop Awards	2018	Herself	Hot Ticket Performer	Nominated	
BET Hip Hop Awards	2018	Herself	MVP of the Year	Won	
BET Hip Hop Awards	2018	Herself	Made-You-Look Award (Best Hip Hop Style)	Won	
BET Hip Hop Awards	2018	Herself	Hustler of the Year	Won	
BET Hip Hop Awards	2018	Invasion of Privacy	Album of the Year	Nominated	
BET Hip Hop Awards	2018	"I Like It" (featuring Bad Bunny and J Balvin)	Best Hip-Hop Video	Nominated	
BET Hip Hop Awards	2018	"I Like It" (featuring Bad Bunny and J Balvin)	Single of the Year	Nominated	
BET Hip Hop Awards	2018	"I Like It" (featuring Bad Bunny and J Balvin)	Best Collabo, Duo or Group	Nominated	
BET Hip Hop Awards	2018	"MotorSport"	Sweet 16: Best Featured Verse	Won	
BET Hip Hop Awards	2019	Herself	Hot Ticket Performer	Nominated	
BET Hip Hop Awards	2019	Herself	MVP of the Year	Nominated	
BET Hip Hop Awards	2019	Herself	Made-You-Look Award (Best Hip-Hop Style)	Won	
BET Hip Hop Awards	2019	Herself	Hustler of the Year	Nominated	
BET Hip Hop Awards	2019	"Money"	Single of the Year	Nominated	
BET Hip Hop Awards	2019	"Money"	Best Hip-Hop Video	Won	
BET Hip Hop Awards	2019	"Twerk" (with City Girls)	Best Hip-Hop Video	Nominated	
BET Hip Hop Awards	2019	"Twerk"	Sweet 16: Best Featured Verse	Nominated	
BET Hip Hop Awards	2019	"Clout"	Sweet 16: Best Featured Verse	Nominated	
BET Hip Hop Awards	2019	"Please Me" (with Bruno Mars)	Best Collab, Duo or Group	Nominated	
BET Hip Hop Awards	2020	Herself	Hustler of the Year	Nominated	
BET Hip Hop Awards	2020	"Writing on the Wall"	Sweet 16: Best Featured Verse	Nominated	
BET Hip Hop Awards	2021	Herself	Hip-Hop Artist of the Year	Nominated	
BET Hip Hop Awards	2021	Herself	Best Live Performer	Nominated	
BET Hip Hop Awards	2021	Herself	Hustler of the Year	Nominated	
BET Hip Hop Awards	2021	"Up"	Song of the Year	Nominated	
BET Hip Hop Awards	2021	"Up"	Best Hip-Hop Video	Nominated	
BET Hip Hop Awards	2021	"WAP" (with Megan Thee Stallion)	Song of the Year	Won	
BET Hip Hop Awards	2021	"WAP" (with Megan Thee Stallion)	Best Hip-Hop Video	Won	
BET Hip Hop Awards	2021	"WAP" (with Megan Thee Stallion)	Best Collaboration	Won	
BET Hip Hop Awards	2021	"Type Sh**"	Sweet 16: Best Featured Verse	Nominated	
BET Hip Hop Awards	2022	"Hot Shit"	Best Hip Hop Video	Nominated	
BET Hip Hop Awards	2022	"Hot Shit"	Best Collaboration	Nominated	
BET Hip Hop Awards	2022	"Hot Shit"	Song Of The Year	Nominated	
BET Hip Hop Awards	2022	Herself	Best Live Performer	Nominated	
BET Hip Hop Awards	2022	Herself	Hip Hop Artist Of The Year	Nominated	
BET Hip Hop Awards	2022	Herself	Hustler Of The Year	Nominated	
BET Hip Hop Awards	2023	"Put It on da Floor Again" (with Latto)	Best Hip Hop Video	Nominated	
BET Hip Hop Awards	2023	"Put It on da Floor Again" (with Latto)	Best Collaboration	Nominated	
BET Hip Hop Awards	2023	"Put It on da Floor Again" (with Latto)	Song Of The Year	Nominated	
BET Hip Hop Awards	2023	"Put It on da Floor Again" (with Latto)	Best Featured Verse	Nominated	
BET Hip Hop Awards	2023	"Tomorrow 2" (with GloRilla)	Best Hip Hop Video	Nominated	
BET Hip Hop Awards	2023	"Tomorrow 2" (with GloRilla)	Best Collaboration	Nominated	
BET Hip Hop Awards	2023	"Tomorrow 2" (with GloRilla)	Song Of The Year	Nominated	
BET Hip Hop Awards	2023	"Tomorrow 2" (with GloRilla)	Best Featured Verse	Nominated	
BET Hip Hop Awards	2023	Herself	Best Live Performer	Nominated	
BET Hip Hop Awards	2023	Herself	Lyricist of the Year	Nominated	
BET Hip Hop Awards	2023	Herself	Hustler Of The Year	Nominated	
BET Hip Hop Awards	2024	Herself	Hip Hop Artist of the Year	Nominated	
BET Hip Hop Awards	2024	Herself	Best Live Performer	Nominated	
BET Hip Hop Awards	2024	Herself	Lyricist of the Year	Nominated	
BET Hip Hop Awards	2024	Herself	Hustler of the Year	Nominated	
BET Hip Hop Awards	2024	"Bongos" (with Megan Thee Stallion)	Best Collaboration	Nominated	
BET Hip Hop Awards	2024	"Wanna Be"	Sweet 16: Best Featured Verse	Nominated	
BET Hip Hop Awards	2024	"Enough (Miami)"	Best Hip Hop Video	Nominated	
BET Social Awards	2018	Cardi B & Offset	Baewatch	Nominated	
BET Social Awards	2019	Herself	Best Celebrity Follow	Won	
Billboard Latin Music Awards	2019	Herself	Crossover Artist of the Year	Won	
Billboard Latin Music Awards	2019	"Taki Taki" (with DJ Snake, Selena Gomez, & Ozuna)	Hot Latin Song of the Year	Nominated	
Billboard Latin Music Awards	2019	"Taki Taki" (with DJ Snake, Selena Gomez, & Ozuna)	Hot Latin Song of the Year, Vocal Event	Nominated	
Billboard Latin Music Awards	2019	"Taki Taki" (with DJ Snake, Selena Gomez, & Ozuna)	Digital Song of the Year	Nominated	
Billboard Latin Music Awards	2024	Herself	Crossover Artist of the Year	Nominated	
Billboard Live Music Awards	2018	Herself	Breakthrough Artist	Nominated	
Billboard Music Awards	2018	Herself	Top New Artist	Nominated	
Billboard Music Awards	2018	Herself	Billboard Chart Achievement Award	Nominated	
Billboard Music Awards	2018	Herself	Top Female Artist	Nominated	
Billboard Music Awards	2018	Herself	Top Streaming Songs Artist	Nominated	
Billboard Music Awards	2018	Herself	Top Rap Female Artist	Won	
Billboard Music Awards	2018	"Bodak Yellow"	Top Streaming Song (Video)	Nominated	
Billboard Music Awards	2018	"Bodak Yellow"	Top Rap Song	Nominated	
Billboard Music Awards	2018	"Finesse" (with Bruno Mars)	Top R&B Song	Nominated	
Billboard Music Awards	2019	Herself	Top Artist	Nominated	
Billboard Music Awards	2019	Herself	Top Female Artist	Nominated	
Billboard Music Awards	2019	Herself	Top Streaming Artist	Nominated	
Billboard Music Awards	2019	Herself	Top Radio Songs Artist	Nominated	
Billboard Music Awards	2019	Herself	Top Hot 100 Artist	Nominated	
Billboard Music Awards	2019	Herself	Top Rap Artist	Nominated	
Billboard Music Awards	2019	Herself	Top Rap Female Artist	Won	
Billboard Music Awards	2019	Invasion of Privacy	Top Billboard 200 Album	Nominated	
Billboard Music Awards	2019	Invasion of Privacy	Top Rap Album	Nominated	
Billboard Music Awards	2019	"Girls Like You" (with Maroon 5)	Top Hot 100 Song	Won	
Billboard Music Awards	2019	"Girls Like You" (with Maroon 5)	Top Streaming Song (Video)	Nominated	
Billboard Music Awards	2019	"Girls Like You" (with Maroon 5)	Top Collaboration	Won	
Billboard Music Awards	2019	"Girls Like You" (with Maroon 5)	Top Radio Song	Won	
Billboard Music Awards	2019	"Girls Like You" (with Maroon 5)	Top Selling Song	Won	
Billboard Music Awards	2019	"I Like It" (featuring Bad Bunny and J Balvin)	Top Hot 100 Song	Nominated	
Billboard Music Awards	2019	"I Like It" (featuring Bad Bunny and J Balvin)	Top Streaming Song (Audio)	Nominated	
Billboard Music Awards	2019	"I Like It" (featuring Bad Bunny and J Balvin)	Top Collaboration	Nominated	
Billboard Music Awards	2019	"I Like It" (featuring Bad Bunny and J Balvin)	Top Selling Song	Nominated	
Billboard Music Awards	2019	"I Like It" (featuring Bad Bunny and J Balvin)	Top Rap Song	Won	
Billboard Music Awards	2019	"Taki Taki" (with DJ Snake, Selena Gomez, & Ozuna)	Top Latin Song	Nominated	
Billboard Music Awards	2019	"Taki Taki" (with DJ Snake, Selena Gomez, & Ozuna)	Top Dance/Electronic Song	Nominated	
Billboard Music Awards	2020	Herself	Top Rap Female Artist	Won	
Billboard Music Awards	2021	Herself	Top Rap Female Artist	Nominated	
Billboard Music Awards	2021	"WAP"	Top Selling Song	Nominated	
Billboard Music Awards	2021	"WAP"	Top Streaming song	Nominated	
Billboard Music Awards	2021	"WAP"	Top Rap Song	Nominated	
Billboard Music Awards	2022	Herself	Top Rap Female Artist	Nominated	
Billboard Women in Music	2020	Herself	Woman of the Year	Won	
Berlin Music Video Awards	2021	WAP	Best Art Director	Nominated	
Brazil TodaTeen Awards	2020	"Coronavirus"	Meme of the Year	Won	
Bravo Otto	2018	Herself	Hip-Hop	Gold	
Bravo Otto	2019	Herself	Hip-Hop International	Gold	
Bravo Otto	2020	Herself	Hip-Hop International	Gold	
Break the Internet Awards	2018	Herself	People's Icon	Won	
Break the Internet Awards	2018	"My momma said"	Meme of the Year	Won	
Break the Internet Awards	2018	Cardi B's response to fat shaming	Clapback of the Year	Nominated	
Break the Internet Awards	2018	Invasion of Privacy	Music Drop of The Year	Nominated	
Brit Awards	2019	Herself	International Female Solo Artist	Nominated	
Brit Awards	2021	Herself	International Female Solo Artist	Nominated	
Capricho Awards	2020	Herself	Best International Artist	Won	
Capricho Awards	2020	"Me Gusta" (Anitta featuring Cardi B and Myke Towers)	Feature of the Year	Won	
Clio Awards	2018	"Bodak Yellow"	Commercials	Shortlisted	
Detroit City Council	2017	Herself	Spirit of Detroit Award	Won	
Ebony Power 100 Gala	2018	Herself	Entertainment & Arts	Won	
Entertainment Weekly	2018	Herself	Entertainer of the Year	Won	
FN Achievement Awards	2020	Herself	Style Influencer of the Year	Won	
GAFFA Awards (Denmark)	2019	Herself	Best Foreign New Act	Won	
GAFFA Awards (Denmark)	2019	Herself	Best Foreign Artist	Nominated	
GAFFA Awards (Denmark)	2019	"Finesse" (with Bruno Mars)	Best Foreign Song	Nominated	
GAFFA Awards (Denmark)	2021	"WAP" (featuring Megan Thee Stallion)	Best Foreign Song	Nominated	
GAFFA Awards (Norway)	2018	Herself	Best Foreign Artist	Nominated	
GAFFA Awards (Norway)	2018	Invasion of Privacy	Best Foreign Album	Nominated	
GAFFA Awards (Norway)	2018	"I Like It" (featuring Bad Bunny and J Balvin)	Best Foreign Song	Nominated	
GAFFA Awards (Norway)	2018	"Girls Like You" (with Maroon 5)	Best Foreign Song	Nominated	
GAFFA Awards (Sweden)	2019	Herself	Best Foreign Solo Artist	Nominated	
GAFFA Awards (Sweden)	2019	"I Like It" (featuring Bad Bunny and J Balvin)	Best Foreign Song	Nominated	
Global Awards	2019	Herself	Social Media Superstar	Nominated	
Global Awards	2021	Herself	Best Hip-Hop or R&B	Won	
Grammy Awards	2018	"Bodak Yellow"	Best Rap Performance	Nominated	
Grammy Awards	2018	"Bodak Yellow"	Best Rap Song	Nominated	
Grammy Awards	2019	Invasion of Privacy	Album of the Year	Nominated	
Grammy Awards	2019	Invasion of Privacy	Best Rap Album	Won	
Grammy Awards	2019	"I Like It" (featuring Bad Bunny and J Balvin)	Record of the Year	Nominated	
Grammy Awards	2019	"Girls Like You" (with Maroon 5)	Best Pop Duo/Group Performance	Nominated	
Grammy Awards	2019	"Be Careful"	Best Rap Performance	Nominated	
Grammy Awards	2020	"Clout" (with Offset)	Best Rap Performance	Nominated	
Grammy Awards	2022	"Up"	Best Rap Performance	Nominated	
Grammy Awards	2025	"Enough (Miami)"	Best Rap Performance	Nominated	
Grammy Awards	2026	"Outside"	Best Rap Performance	Nominated	
Grammy Awards	2027	"ErrTime"	Best Rap Performance	Pending	
Grammy Awards	2027	"ErrTime"	Best Rap Song	Pending	
Grammy Awards	2027	Am I the Drama?	Best Rap Album	Pending	
Grammy Awards	2027	"Safe" (featuring Kehlani)	Best Melodic Rap Performance	Pending	
Guinness World Records	2019	Herself	Most simultaneous Billboard US Hot 100 entries by a female	Won	
Guinness World Records	2019	Herself	Most simultaneous Billboard US Hot R&B/Hip-Hop Top 10 entries by a female	Won	
Guinness World Records	2019	Invasion of Privacy	Most streamed album on Apple Music in one week by a female artist	Won	
Guinness World Records	2020	Herself	Most US No.1 singles by a female rapper	Won	
Guinness World Records	2020	Herself	First solo female artist to win Best Rap Album at the Grammy Awards	Won	
Guinness World Records	2022	Herself	Most RIAA Diamond singles for a female artist	Won	
Guinness World Records	2025	Am I the Drama?	Most deliveries by UAV drones in one hour	Won	
Guinness World Records	2025	Am I the Drama?	Most signed items sold in 8 hours	Won	
Hip Hop DE Awards	2017	Herself	Best Newcomer International	Won	
Hip Hop DE Awards	2020	"WAP" (featuring Megan Thee Stallion)	Best International Song	Won	
Hip Hop DE Awards	2020	"WAP" (featuring Megan Thee Stallion)	Best International Video	Nominated	
HipHopDX Awards	2017	"Bodak Yellow"	Hottest Song of the Year	Won	
HipHopDX Awards	2017	Herself	Comeup of the Year	Won	
HipHopDX Awards	2018	Herself	Comeup of the Year	Won	
HipHopDX Awards	2019	Rhythm & Flow (as a judge and executive producer)	Best TV Show of the Year	Won	
HipHopDX Awards	2022	"Tomorrow 2"	Best Collaboration of the Year	Won	
Hollywood Unlocked Awards	2024	Herself	Inspiration Award	Won	
iHeartRadio Much Music Video Awards	2018	Herself	Best Hip Hop Artist or Group	Nominated	
iHeartRadio Much Music Video Awards	2018	Herself	Artist of the Year	Nominated	
iHeartRadio Much Music Video Awards	2018	Herself	Fan Fave New Artist	Nominated	
iHeartRadio Much Music Video Awards	2018	"I Like It" (featuring Bad Bunny and J Balvin)	Song of the Summer	Nominated	
iHeartRadio Music Awards	2018	Herself	Best New Artist	Won	
iHeartRadio Music Awards	2018	Herself	Best New Hip-Hop Artist	Won	
iHeartRadio Music Awards	2018	"Bodak Yellow"	Hip-Hop Song of the Year	Nominated	
iHeartRadio Music Awards	2018	"Bodak Yellow"	Best Lyrics	Nominated	
iHeartRadio Music Awards	2018	"Bodak Yellow"	Best Music Video	Nominated	
iHeartRadio Music Awards	2019	Herself	Female Artist of the Year	Nominated	
iHeartRadio Music Awards	2019	Herself	Hip-Hop Artist of the Year	Won	
iHeartRadio Music Awards	2019	"Girls Like You" (with Maroon 5)	Song of the Year	Nominated	
iHeartRadio Music Awards	2019	"Girls Like You" (with Maroon 5)	Best Music Video	Nominated	
iHeartRadio Music Awards	2019	"Girls Like You" (with Maroon 5)	Best Lyrics	Nominated	
iHeartRadio Music Awards	2019	"Girls Like You" (with Maroon 5)	Best Collaboration	Nominated	
iHeartRadio Music Awards	2019	"Finesse" (with Bruno Mars)	Best Collaboration	Won	
iHeartRadio Music Awards	2019	"Finesse" (with Bruno Mars)	R&B Song of the Year	Nominated	
iHeartRadio Music Awards	2019	"Finesse" (with Bruno Mars)	Best Music Video	Nominated	
iHeartRadio Music Awards	2019	"I Like It" (featuring Bad Bunny and J Balvin)	Hip-Hop Song of the Year	Nominated	
iHeartRadio Music Awards	2019	"I Like It" (featuring Bad Bunny and J Balvin)	Best Music Video	Nominated	
iHeartRadio Music Awards	2019	"I Like It" (featuring Bad Bunny and J Balvin)	Best Collaboration	Nominated	
iHeartRadio Music Awards	2019	"Taki Taki" (with DJ Snake, Selena Gomez and Ozuna)	Best Music Video	Nominated	
iHeartRadio Music Awards	2019	BardiGang	Best Fan Army	Nominated	
iHeartRadio Music Awards	2020	"Money"	Hip-Hop Song of the Year	Nominated	
iHeartRadio Music Awards	2020	Herself	Hip-Hop Artist of the Year	Nominated	
iHeartRadio Music Awards	2020	"Taki Taki" (with DJ Snake, Selena Gomez, & Ozuna)	Latin Pop/Urban Song of the Year	Nominated	
iHeartRadio Music Awards	2020	"Thotiana (remix)" (Blueface featuring Cardi B and YG)	Best Remix	Nominated	
iHeartRadio Music Awards	2021	"WAP" (featuring Megan Thee Stallion)	Best Music Video	Nominated	
iHeartRadio Music Awards	2021	"WAP" (featuring Megan Thee Stallion)	TikTok Bop of the Year	Nominated	
iHeartRadio Music Awards	2022	"Up"	Hip-Hop Song of the Year	Nominated	
iHeartRadio Music Awards	2022	"Up"	TikTok Bop of the Year	Nominated	
iHeartRadio Music Awards	2024	"Tomorrow 2"	Best Collaboration	Nominated	
iHeartRadio Music Awards	2024	"Tomorrow 2"	Hip-Hop Song of the Year	Nominated	
iHeartRadio Music Awards	2025	Herself	Favorite Surprise Guest	Nominated	
iHeartRadio Music Awards	2026	Herself	Hip-Hop Artist of the Year	Nominated	
iHeartRadio Music Awards	2026	"Outside"	Hip-Hop Song of the Year	Nominated	
iHeartRadio Titanium Awards	2019	"I Like It" (featuring Bad Bunny and J Balvin)	1 Billion Total Audience Spins on iHeartRadio Stations	Won	
iHeartRadio Titanium Awards	2019	"Finesse (remix)" (with Bruno Mars)	1 Billion Total Audience Spins on iHeartRadio Stations	Won	
iHeartRadio Titanium Awards	2019	"Girls Like You" (with Maroon 5)	1 Billion Total Audience Spins on iHeartRadio Stations	Won	
iHeartRadio Women In Music Awards	2021	Herself	She Her Award	Won	
Juno Awards	2019	Invasion of Privacy	International Album of the Year	Nominated	
Latin American Music Awards	2018	Herself	Favorite Crossover Artist	Nominated	
Latin American Music Awards	2019	"Taki Taki" (with DJ Snake, Selena Gomez, & Ozuna)	Song of the Year	Won	
Latin American Music Awards	2019	"Taki Taki" (with DJ Snake, Selena Gomez, & Ozuna)	Favorite Urban Song	Won	
Latin American Music Awards	2021	Herself	Social Artist of the Year	Won	
Latin Music Italian Awards	2017	"Bodak Yellow" (with Messiah)	Best Latin Urban Song of the Year	Nominated	
Latin Music Italian Awards	2017	Herself	Best Latin Revelation of the Year	Nominated	
Latin Music Italian Awards	2018	Herself	Best Latin Female Artist of the Year	Won	
Latin Music Italian Awards	2018	Herself	Best Look	Nominated	
Latin Music Italian Awards	2018	"I Like It" (featuring Bad Bunny and J Balvin)	Best Latin Song of the Year	Nominated	
Latin Music Italian Awards	2019	Herself	Best Look	Won	
Latin Music Italian Awards	2019	Herself	Best Latin Artist Worldwide	Nominated	
Latin Music Italian Awards	2020	Herself	Best Latin Artist Worldwide	Won	
Latin Music Italian Awards	2020	"Me Gusta" (with Anitta and Myke Towers)	Best Latin Female Video	Won	
Latin Music Italian Awards	2020	"Me Gusta" (with Anitta and Myke Towers)	Best Spanglish Song	Won	
The Lockdown Awards	2020	Cardi B's Do It Yourself Hair Mask	Favorite Musician Not Playing Music	Won	
Lo Nuestro Awards	2019	Herself	Female Urban Artist of the Year	Nominated	
Lo Nuestro Awards	2019	"I Like It" (featuring Bad Bunny and J Balvin)	Crossover Collaboration of the Year	Nominated	
Lo Nuestro Awards	2019	"Taki Taki" (with DJ Snake, Selena Gomez and Ozuna)	Crossover Collaboration of the Year	Won	
Lo Nuestro Awards	2021	"Me Gusta" (with Anitta and Myke Towers)	Crossover Collaboration of the Year	Nominated	
LOS40 Music Awards	2019	"Taki Taki" (with DJ Snake, Selena Gomez and Ozuna)	LOS40 Global Show Award	Nominated	
Love & Hip Hop Awards	2019	Herself	Most Quotable	Won	
Love & Hip Hop Awards	2019	Herself	Most Viral	Won	
MOBO Awards	2017	Herself	Best International Act	Nominated	
MTV Europe Music Awards	2018	Herself	Best New Act	Won	
MTV Europe Music Awards	2018	Herself	Best US Act	Nominated	
MTV Europe Music Awards	2018	Herself	Best Look	Nominated	
MTV Europe Music Awards	2019	Herself	Best Hip-Hop	Nominated	
MTV Europe Music Awards	2020	Herself	Best Hip-Hop	Won	
MTV Europe Music Awards	2020	Herself	Best US Act	Nominated	
MTV Europe Music Awards	2020	"WAP" (featuring Megan Thee Stallion)	Best Video	Nominated	
MTV Europe Music Awards	2020	"WAP" (featuring Megan Thee Stallion)	Best Collaboration	Nominated	
MTV Europe Music Awards	2021	Herself	Best Hip-Hop	Nominated	
MTV Europe Music Awards	2021	"Wild Side" (with Normani)	Best Video	Nominated	
MTV Millennial Awards	2018	"Finesse" (with Bruno Mars)	International Hit of the Year	Nominated	
MTV Millennial Awards	2019	"Taki Taki" (with DJ Snake, Selena Gomez and Ozuna)	Music-ship of the Year	Won	
MTV Millennial Awards	2019	"I Like It" (featuring Bad Bunny and J Balvin)	Global Hit	Nominated	
MTV Millennial Awards	2019	Cardi B vs. Nicki Minaj	Ridiculous of the Year	Won	
MTV Millennial Awards	2021	Herself	Viral Philosopher	Won	
MTV Millennial Awards Brazil	2018	"Finesse" (with Bruno Mars)	International Hit	Nominated	
MTV Millennial Awards Brazil	2019	"Taki Taki" (with DJ Snake, Selena Gomez, & Ozuna)	Global Hit	Nominated	
MTV Millennial Awards Brazil	2019	"I Like It" (featuring Bad Bunny and J Balvin)	Global Hit	Nominated	
MTV Millennial Awards Brazil	2020	Cardi B yelling Coronavirus	Quarantine Meme	Nominated	
MTV Movie & TV Awards	2021	Cardi Tries	Best New Unscripted Series	Nominated	
MTV Video Play Awards	2019	"Girls Like You" (with Maroon 5)	Winning Video	Won	
MTV Video Music Awards	2018	"Finesse" (with Bruno Mars)	Video of the Year	Nominated	
MTV Video Music Awards	2018	"Finesse" (with Bruno Mars)	Song of the Year	Nominated	
MTV Video Music Awards	2018	"Finesse" (with Bruno Mars)	Best Collaboration	Nominated	
MTV Video Music Awards	2018	"Finesse" (with Bruno Mars)	Best Choreography	Nominated	
MTV Video Music Awards	2018	"Finesse" (with Bruno Mars)	Best Editing	Nominated	
MTV Video Music Awards	2018	Herself	Artist of the Year	Nominated	
MTV Video Music Awards	2018	Herself	Best New Artist	Won	
MTV Video Music Awards	2018	"Bartier Cardi" (featuring 21 Savage)	Best Hip Hop	Nominated	
MTV Video Music Awards	2018	"Dinero" (with DJ Khaled and Jennifer Lopez)	Best Latin	Nominated	
MTV Video Music Awards	2018	"Dinero" (with DJ Khaled and Jennifer Lopez)	Best Collaboration	Won	
MTV Video Music Awards	2018	"I Like It" (featuring Bad Bunny and J Balvin)	Song of Summer	Won	
MTV Video Music Awards	2018	"Girls Like You" (with Maroon 5)	Song of Summer	Nominated	
MTV Video Music Awards	2019	Herself	Artist of the Year	Nominated	
MTV Video Music Awards	2019	"Please Me" (with Bruno Mars)	Best Pop	Nominated	
MTV Video Music Awards	2019	"Money"	Best Hip Hop	Won	
MTV Video Music Awards	2019	"Taki Taki" (with DJ Snake, Selena Gomez, and Ozuna)	Best Dance	Nominated	
MTV Video Music Awards	2019	"Wish Wish" (with DJ Khaled and 21 Savage)	Best Power Anthem	Nominated	
MTV Video Music Awards	2020	"WAP" (featuring Megan Thee Stallion)	Song of Summer	Nominated	
MTV Video Music Awards	2021	"WAP" (featuring Megan Thee Stallion)	Video of the Year	Nominated	
MTV Video Music Awards	2021	"WAP" (featuring Megan Thee Stallion)	Song of the Year	Nominated	
MTV Video Music Awards	2021	"WAP" (featuring Megan Thee Stallion)	Best Collaboration	Nominated	
MTV Video Music Awards	2021	"WAP" (featuring Megan Thee Stallion)	Best Hip Hop	Nominated	
MTV Video Music Awards	2021	"Rumors" (with Lizzo)	Song of Summer	Nominated	
MTV Video Music Awards	2021	"Wild Side" (with Normani)	Song of Summer	Nominated	
MTV Video Music Awards	2022	"Wild Side" (with Normani)	Best Choreography	Nominated	
MTV Video Music Awards	2022	"Wild Side" (with Normani)	Best Cinematography	Nominated	
MTV Video Music Awards	2022	"Wild Side" (with Normani)	Best R&B Video	Nominated	
MTV Video Music Awards	2022	"No Love (Extended Version)" (with Summer Walker and SZA)	Best R&B Video	Nominated	
MTV Video Music Awards	2023	"Tomorrow 2" (with GloRilla)	Best Hip-Hop	Nominated	
MTV Video Music Awards	2024	"Puntería" (with Shakira)	Best Latin	Nominated	
Myx Music Awards	2019	"Girls Like You" (with Maroon 5)	Favorite International Video	Nominated	
NAACP Image Awards	2019	"Finesse (remix)" (with Bruno Mars)	Outstanding Duo, Group or Collaboration	Nominated	
NAACP Image Awards	2019	"Finesse (remix)" (with Bruno Mars)	Outstanding Music Video/Visual Album	Nominated	
NAACP Image Awards	2019	"Finesse (remix)" (with Bruno Mars)	Outstanding Song – Contemporary	Nominated	
NAACP Image Awards	2020	Rhythm & Flow (as a judge and executive producer)	Outstanding Reality Program, Reality Competition or Game Show	Won	
NAACP Image Awards	2026	Herself	Outstanding Female Artist	Won	
NAACP Image Awards	2026	Am I the Drama?	Outstanding Album	Won	
NAACP Image Awards	2026	"Safe" (with Kehlani)	Outstanding Duo, Group or Collaboration (Contemporary)	Nominated	
NAACP Image Awards	2026	"ErrTime"	Outstanding Hip Hop/Rap Song	Won	
National Film & TV Awards	2019	Hustlers	Best Performance in a Movie	Nominated	
Neighborhood Defender Service	2021	Herself	Special Recognition Award	Won	
NET Honours	2020	Herself	Most Popular Foreign Celebrity Female	Won	
NET Honours	2021	Herself	Most Popular Foreign Celebrity Female	Won	
Nickelodeon Kids' Choice Awards	2018	Herself	Favorite Breakout Artist	Nominated	
Nickelodeon Kids' Choice Awards	2019	Herself	Favorite Breakout Artist	Nominated	
Nickelodeon Kids' Choice Awards	2019	Herself	Favorite Female Artist	Nominated	
Nickelodeon Kids' Choice Awards	2019	"Girls Like You" (with Maroon 5)	Favorite Music Collaboration	Nominated	
Nickelodeon Kids' Choice Awards	2019	"I Like It" (with Bad Bunny and J Balvin)	Favorite Music Collaboration	Nominated	
Nickelodeon Kids' Choice Awards	2022	Herself	Favorite Female Artist	Nominated	
Nickelodeon Kids' Choice Awards	2022	"Up"	Favorite Song	Nominated	
Nickelodeon Kids' Choice Awards	2022	"Rumors" (with Lizzo)	Favorite Music Collaboration	Nominated	
Nickelodeon Kids' Choice Awards	2023	Herself	Favorite Female Artist	Nominated	
Nickelodeon Kids' Choice Awards	2024	Herself	Favorite Female Artist	Nominated	
Nickelodeon Kids' Choice Awards	2025	Herself	Favorite Female Artist	Nominated	
Nickelodeon Kids' Choice Awards	2025	"Higher Love" (from Smurfs)	Favorite Song from a Movie	Nominated	
NME Awards	2020	Best Festival Headliner	Herself	Nominated	
NRJ DJ Awards	2019	"Taki Taki" (with DJ Snake, Selena Gomez and Ozuna)	Club Hit of the Year	Nominated	
NRJ Music Awards	2018	Herself	International Breakthrough of the Year	Nominated	
NRJ Music Awards	2018	"Girls Like You" (with Maroon 5)	Video of the Year	Nominated	
NRJ Music Awards	2018	"Girls Like You" (with Maroon 5)	Song of the Year	Won	
People's Choice Awards	2018	Herself	Female Artist of 2018	Nominated	
People's Choice Awards	2018	"I Like It" (featuring Bad Bunny and J Balvin)	Song of 2018	Nominated	
People's Choice Awards	2018	Invasion of Privacy	Album of 2018	Nominated	
People's Choice Awards	2019	Herself	Female Artist of 2019	Nominated	
People's Choice Awards	2019	Herself	Style Star of 2019	Nominated	
People's Choice Awards	2019	Herself	Social Celebrity of 2019	Nominated	
People's Choice Awards	2020	Herself	Female Artist of 2020	Nominated	
People's Choice Awards	2020	"WAP" (featuring Megan Thee Stallion)	Song of 2020	Nominated	
People's Choice Awards	2020	"WAP" (featuring Megan Thee Stallion)	Music Video of 2020	Nominated	
People's Choice Awards	2020	"WAP" (featuring Megan Thee Stallion)	Collaboration of 2020	Won	
People's Choice Awards	2021	Herself	Female Artist of 2021	Nominated	
People's Choice Awards	2021	"Up"	Music Video of 2021	Nominated	
People's Choice Awards	2024	Herself	The Hip-Hop Artist of the Year	Nominated	
People en Español	2018	Herself	Star of the Year	Won	
PLAY - Portuguese Music Awards	2019	Herself	Best International Artist	Nominated	
Pornhub Awards	2018	Herself	Celebrity of the Year	Nominated	
Pornhub Awards	2019	Herself	Top Celebrity	Nominated	
Premios Juventud	2019	Herself	Best Reality Show Break-Out Artist	Won	
Premios Juventud	2019	Herself	Shoe-Aholic	Won	
Premios Juventud	2019	"Taki Taki" (with DJ Snake, Selena Gomez, & Ozuna)	This Is a BTS (Best Behind the Scenes)	Won	
Premios Juventud	2020	Herself	Nailed It	Nominated	
Premios Juventud	2020	Herself	Scroll Stopper	Nominated	
Premios Juventud	2023	"Despechá RMX"	OMG Collaboration	Won	
Premios Juventud	2023	"Despechá RMX"	Girl Power	Nominated	
Prêmio Jovem Brasileiro	2019	"Taki Taki" (with DJ Snake, Selena Gomez and Ozuna)	Me Gusta	Nominated	
Prêmio F5	2020	"Me Gusta" (Anitta featuring Cardi B and Myke Towers)	Hit of the Year	Won	
Prêmio POP Mais	2020	"WAP" (featuring Megan Thee Stallion)	Hit Internacional	Won	
Prêmio POP Mais	2020	"Me Gusta" (Anitta featuring Cardi B and Myke Towers)	Melhor Clipe	Won	
RTHK International Pop Poll Awards	2019	"Girls Like You" (with Maroon 5)	Top Ten International Gold Songs	Won	
Shorty Awards	2018	Herself	Best in Music	Won	
Shorty Awards	2019	"Okurrrrr"	Best Gif	Nominated	
Soberano Awards	2019	Herself	Outstanding Artist Abroad	Nominated	
Soul Train Music Awards	2017	"Bodak Yellow"	Rhythm & Bars Award	Won	
Soul Train Music Awards	2018	"I Like It" (featuring Bad Bunny and J Balvin)	Rhythm & Bars Award	Nominated	
Soul Train Music Awards	2018	"Finesse" (with Bruno Mars)	Song of the Year	Nominated	
Soul Train Music Awards	2018	"Finesse" (with Bruno Mars)	The Ashford and Simpson Songwriter's Award	Nominated	
Soul Train Music Awards	2018	"Finesse" (with Bruno Mars)	Best Dance Performance	Nominated	
Soul Train Music Awards	2018	"Finesse" (with Bruno Mars)	Best Collaboration Performance	Nominated	
Soul Train Music Awards	2018	"Finesse" (with Bruno Mars)	Video of the Year	Won	
Soul Train Music Awards	2019	"Money"	Rhythm & Bars Award	Won	
Soul Train Music Awards	2019	"Please Me" (with Bruno Mars)	Best Collaboration	Nominated	
Soul Train Music Awards	2020	"WAP" (featuring Megan Thee Stallion)	Rhythm & Bars Award	Nominated	
Soul Train Music Awards	2021	"Wild Side" (with Normani)	Video of the Year	Nominated	
Soul Train Music Awards	2021	"Wild Side" (with Normani)	Best Dance Performance	Won	
Soul Train Music Awards	2021	"Rumors" (with Lizzo)	Best Dance Performance	Nominated	
Spotify Awards	2020	"I Like It" (featuring Bad Bunny and J Balvin)	One Billion Streams Award	Won	
Spotify Awards	2020	"Taki Taki" (with DJ Snake, Selena Gomez, & Ozuna)	One Billion Streams Award	Won	
Spotify Awards	2020	"Girls Like You" (with Maroon 5)	One Billion Streams Award	Won	
Spotify Awards	2022	"WAP"	One Billion Streams Award	Won	
Swisher Sweets Awards	2019	Herself	Spark Award	Won	
TEC Awards	2019	"Finesse (remix)" (with Bruno Mars)	Outstanding Creative Achievement – Record Production/Single or Track	Nominated	
Teen Choice Awards	2018	Herself	Choice Artist: R&B/Hip-Hop	Won	
Teen Choice Awards	2018	Herself	Choice Summer Female Artist	Nominated	
Teen Choice Awards	2018	Herself	Choice Female Artist	Nominated	
Teen Choice Awards	2018	"Finesse (remix)" (with Bruno Mars)	Choice Collaboration	Nominated	
Teen Choice Awards	2018	"Finesse (remix)" (with Bruno Mars)	Choice Song: R&B/Hip-Hop	Nominated	
Teen Choice Awards	2018	"Dinero" (with Jennifer Lopez & DJ Khaled)	Choice Song: Latin	Nominated	
Teen Choice Awards	2018	"Girls Like You" (with Maroon 5)	Choice Summer Song	Nominated	
Teen Choice Awards	2019	Herself	Choice Female Artist	Nominated	
Teen Choice Awards	2019	Herself	Choice Artist: R&B/Hip-Hop	Won	
Tu Música Urban Awards	2019	Herself	International Female Artist	Nominated	
Tu Música Urban Awards	2019	"Taki Taki" (with DJ Snake, Selena Gomez and Ozuna)	Urban Pop Song	Nominated	
Tu Música Urban Awards	2019	"I Like It" (featuring Bad Bunny and J Balvin)	International Artist Song	Nominated	
Tu Música Urban Awards	2019	"I Like It" (featuring Bad Bunny and J Balvin)	International Artist Video	Nominated	
UK Music Video Awards	2021	"Wild Side" (with Normani)	Best R&B/Soul Video – International	Won	
Urban Music Awards	2017	Herself	Artist of the Year (USA)	Nominated	
Urban Music Awards	2017	Herself	Best Female Act	Nominated	
Urban Music Awards	2018	Herself	Best International Artist 2018	Nominated	
Urban Music Awards	2018	Herself	Artist of the Year (USA)	Nominated	
Webby Awards	2019	"Girls Like You" (with Maroon 5)	Music Video (Video) – Honoree	Shortlisted	
ZD Awards	2018	Herself	Best Foreign Act	Nominated	
