= HoodCelebrityy =

Jamaican singer (born 1991)

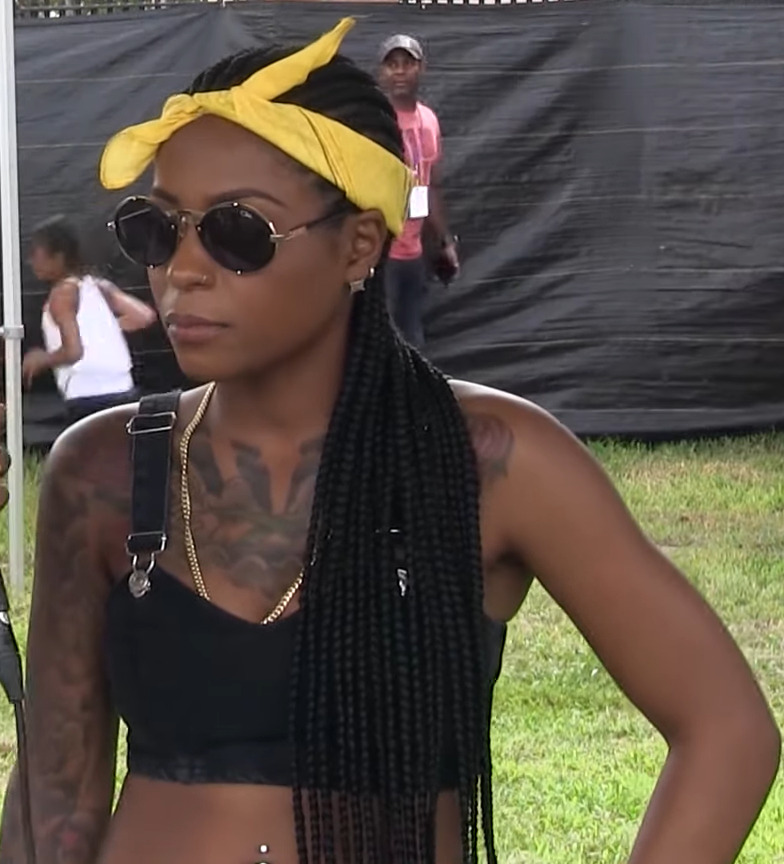
- HoodCelebrityy in 2024

Background information
- Born: Tina Pinnock; 5 July 1991 (age 34); Portmore, Jamaica
- Origin: The Bronx, New York
- Genres: Dancehall; reggae; hip hop
- Occupations: Singer; songwriter
- Years active: 2015–present
- Labels: Epic; KSR
- Website: Official website

Tina Pinnock (born 5 July 1991), known mononymously as Tina and previously known professionally as HoodCelebrityy, is a Jamaican singer and songwriter. Born and raised in Portmore, Jamaica, Tina migrated to The Bronx, New York City at the age of 12. Currently signed to Epic Records, she released two mixtapes in 2017, Can't Believe It's Just a Girl and Trap Vs. Reggae. The latter album peaked at number 9 on the Billboard Reggae Albums chart. Her 2017 single, "Walking Trophy," peaked at number 22 on the R&B/Hip-Hop Airplay chart.

== Early life ==
Tina Pinnock was born and raised in Saint Catherine Parish and Portmore, Jamaica. When she was 12, Pinnock and her family moved to The Bronx, New York. Prior to achieving fame, she worked at a clothing store and uploaded 15-second freestyle videos on her Instagram account.

== Career ==
HoodCelebrityy's breakout came in 2015 when friend and future collaborator, Cardi B, posted about her song, "Wine Pon It". The song went viral soon after. In 2016, HoodCelebrityy was featured on the Jubilee song, "Wine Up." She would later be signed by the management company and record label, KSR Group. In January 2017, she appeared on Cardi B's mixtape, Gangsta Bitch Music, Vol. 2, on the song "Back It Up" which also featured Konshens. That same month, she released the lead single, "The Takeover", off of her debut mixtape, Can't Believe It's Just a Girl. The mixtape was released in the spring of that year.

In August 2017, HoodCelebrityy released her second mixtape, Trap Vs. Reggae, which featured the song "Island Girls," a collaboration with Cardi B and Josh X. The mixtape would later peak at number 9 on the Billboard Reggae Albums chart. Later in 2017, she released the single, "Walking Trophy." She was also featured on the remix of the French Montana song, "Famous." The video for "Walking Trophy" was directed by Mazi O and released in February 2018. The song has thus far peaked at number 22 on the Billboard R&B/Hip-Hop Airplay chart.

In May 2018, HoodCelebrityy was signed to Epic Records. Later that month, she and Tory Lanez were featured on the Megan Ryte track, "On & On." She performed at the 2018 Summer Jam.

On 30 August 2019, HoodCelebrityy released a single called "Bum Pon It" on her official YouTube channel. The song is catered to women and is being played at numerous events worldwide.

== Discography ==
=== Mixtapes ===
List of mixtapes, with album details and selected chart positions
Title	Album details	Peak chart positions	
Title	Album details	US	US Reg.
Can't Believe It's Just a Girl	Released: April 2017; Label: KSR Group; Formats: Digital Download	—	—
Trap Vs. Reggae	Released: 11 August 2017; Label: KSR Group; Formats: Digital Download	—	9
Tina vs Hoodcelebrityy	Released: 17 May 2024; Label: KSR Group; Formats: Digital Download	—	—
"—" denotes a title that did not chart, or was not released in that territory.

=== Singles ===
List of singles, with selected chart positions, showing year released and album name
Title	Year	Peak chart positions			Album
Title	Year	US	US RB/HH Air	US Rhy.	Album
"Wine Pon It"	2015	—	—	—	Non-album single
"The Takeover"	2017	—	—	—	Can't Believe It's Just a Girl
"Island Girls" (feat. Cardi B and Josh X)	2017	—	—	—	Trap Vs. Reggae
"Walking Trophy"	2017	—	22	24	Inna Real Life
"Inna Real Life"	2018	—	—	—	Inna Real Life
"Bum Pon It"	2019	—	—	—	
"—" denotes a single that did not chart or was not released in that territory.
