= Gangsta Bitch Music, Vol. 1 =

2016 mixtape by Cardi B

Mixtape by Cardi B
- Released: March 7, 2016
- Recorded: 2016
- Genre: Hip-hop
- Length: 33:10
- Label: KSR

Cardi B chronology
Gangsta Bitch Music, Vol. 1 (2016)	Gangsta Bitch Music, Vol. 2 (2017)

Gangsta Bitch Music, Vol. 1 is the debut mixtape by American rapper Cardi B. It was released on March 7, 2016, by KSR. A hip-hop record, the mixtape was recorded in 2016, and features guest appearances from Josh X and Haitian V, alongside vocals from The Breakfast Club and Lisa Evers. Upon its release, the mixtape charted at number 30 on Billboard's Top R&B/Hip-Hop Albums chart and at number 27 on their Independent Albums chart, alongside peaking at number 6 on their Heatseekers Albums chart, with all charts based in the United States of America.

== Artwork ==
The album's cover, designed by graphic artist Timm Gooden, depicts Cardi B receiving a cunnilingus in the car from a tattooed man "Kevin Brophy Jr." while drinking from a bottle of Corona Extra beer. The image is actually a photomontage in which a tattoo belonging to Kevin Brophy Jr. was digitally composited onto the body of the uncredited male model who posed for the photo; Brophy later claimed that tattoo image was used without his permission and that his likeness was appropriated in "a misleading, offensive, humiliating and provocatively sexual humiliating way". Brophy has filed suit in California over the unauthorized use of his image, and in December 2020 the court rejected Cardi B's motion for summary judgment on the basis of fair use, sending the case to a jury. On October 21, 2022, jury declared its verdict siding with Cardi B, and clearing her from the copyright infringement allegations.

== Track listing ==
Gangsta Bitch Music, Vol. 1
No.	Title	Length
1.	"Intro (Skit)" (featuring The Breakfast Club)	0:56
2.	"Trust Issues"	2:24
3.	"On Fleek"	2:46
4.	"Washpoppin"	3:20
5.	"Her Perspective (Skit)"	1:30
6.	"Selfish" (featuring Josh X)	3:12
7.	"I Gotta Hurt You"	4:11
8.	"Foreva"	3:22
9.	"Trick (Skit)" (featuring Haitian V)	2:07
10.	"Trick"	2:52
11.	"Lit Thot"	3:01
12.	"Sauce Boyz"	2:53
13.	"Outro (Skit)" (featuring Lisa Evers)	0:36

== Charts ==
Chart (2017)	Peak position
US Heatseekers Albums (Billboard)	6
US Independent Albums (Billboard)	27
US Top R&B/Hip-Hop Albums (Billboard)	30

== See also ==
- List of controversial album art
