= Romantic Depot =

Lingerie store brand

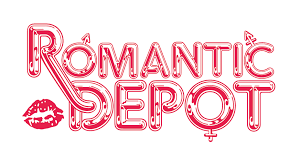
- Company type: Privately held company
- Industry: Apparel & Health and wellness products
- Founded: 2000
- Founders: Glen Buzzetti
- Headquarters: New York City
- Website: romanticdepot.com

Romantic Depot is a brand of lingerie stores that sells sexual health and wellness products. It was founded in 2000 by Glen Buzzetti.

== Overview ==
The first Romantic Depot store was opened in West Nyack, New York, in August 2000. Other stores are located in Manhattan, The Bronx, Queens and Yonkers.

In 2016 the brand signed Cardi B to her first endorsement deal, which was noted by the NY Post in a feature article about "Cardi B's meteoric rise from stripper to superstar" in April 2018.

On February 10, 2019, rapper 6ix9ine appeared in an anti-abuse commercial for Romantic Depot. The brand pulled the spots after it was alleged 6ix9ine was committing violence against his baby's mother, Sara Molina.

In 2020, Romantic Depot was awarded the AVN award for the best retail chain.

A Romantic Depot store opened on Queens Boulevard in January 2021.

On February 14, 2022, Romantic Depot opened a new location at Fulton Street Brooklyn NY.
