= Cardi B =

American rapper (born 1992)

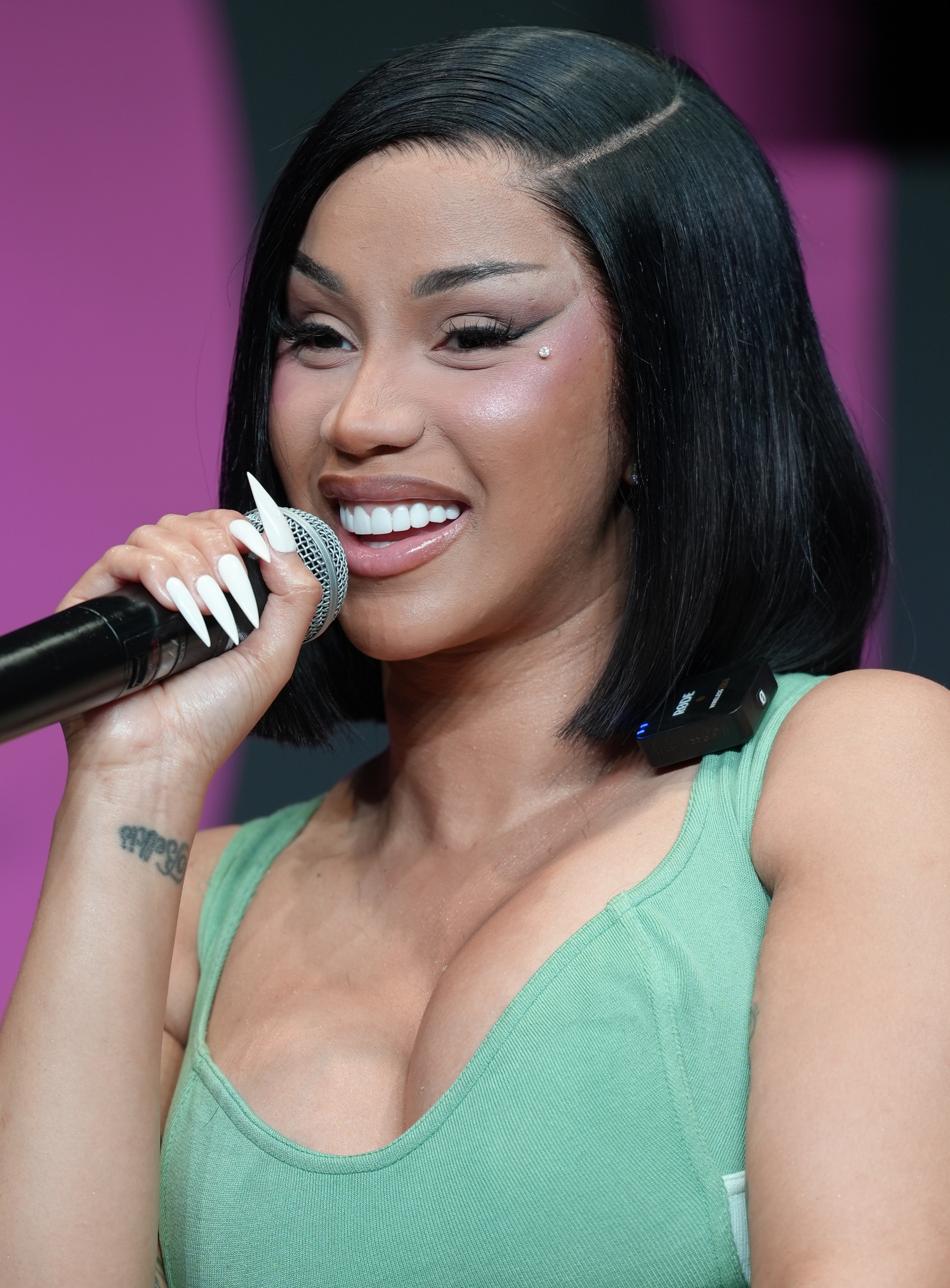
- Cardi B in 2026
- Born: Belcalis Marlenis Almánzar; October 11, 1992 (age 34); New York City, U.S.
- Other name: Belcalis Almánzar-Cephus
- Occupation: Rapper
- Years active: 2015–present
- Spouse: Offset (m. 2017; sep. 2023)
- Partner: Stefon Diggs (2025–2026)
- Children: 4
- Relatives: GloRilla (cousin); Hennessy Carolina (sister)
- Awards: Full list
- Musical career
- Genres: East Coast hip-hop; trap; dirty rap
- Instrument: Vocals
- Labels: KSR; Atlantic
- Website: cardib.com

Belcalis Marlenis Almánzar (Note: English pronunciation: /ˈbɛlkəliːz ɑːlˈmænzɑːr/ BEL-kə-leez ahl-MAN-zar, Spanish pronunciation: Latin American Spanish pronunciation: [alˈmansaɾ].) (formerly Cephus; born October 11, 1992), known professionally as Cardi B, is an American rapper. Born and raised in New York City, she is known for her energetic rap flow and outspoken lyrics. Since launching her music career in 2016 and releasing her two mixtapes, Cardi B has been credited for elevating the relevance of female rappers in popular music.

Her first studio album, Invasion of Privacy (2018), debuted atop the Billboard 200 with the largest female rap album streaming week of all time and became the best-selling and the highest-certified female rap album of the 21st century. Ranked by Rolling Stone as the best debut album of all time by a female rapper, it made Cardi B the first solo female artist in history to win the Grammy Award for Best Rap Album. Its singles "Bodak Yellow" and "I Like It" both topped the Billboard Hot 100 and were certified diamond by the RIAA; the former made Cardi B the first female rapper in the 21st century to top the Hot 100 with a solo song and the first in history to achieve a diamond-certified song, while the latter made her the first-ever with multiple number-one songs. Her third US number-one, the collaboration "Girls Like You" in 2018, made her the first female rapper ever to earn multiple RIAA diamond-certified songs.

Cardi B's second album, Am I the Drama? (2025), made her the only female rapper in history to have her first two albums debut atop the Billboard 200. It became the female rap album with the highest certification of the 2020s, the most weeks inside the top ten of the Billboard 200 in the 2020s, and the most charting songs (18) in Billboard Hot 100 history. Including the US top-ten song "Outside" and US number-ones "WAP" and "Up", it is tied with Invasion of Privacy as the female rap album with the most Hot 100 number-ones (two each). "WAP" is the only female rap collaboration to debut atop the Hot 100 and had a large cultural impact.

Cardi B is the female rapper with the most number-one singles (five) on the Billboard Hot 100, the only female rapper to achieve multiple solo number-ones, and the only to earn number-one singles in two decades (2010s and 2020s). The highest-certified female rapper in US digital single sales (70 million), Cardi B has the most diamond-certified songs (four) among female rappers—with "Bodak Yellow" being the highest-certified female rap song. Furthermore, Invasion of Privacy is the most-streamed female rap album on Apple Music and Spotify. A Grammy Award winner and the female rapper with the most Billboard Music Awards (8), Guinness World Records (8), BET Awards (21) (Note: 14 BET Hip Hop Awards and 7 BET Awards.) and ASCAP Songwriter of the Year awards (2), Cardi B has also won nine American Music Awards, five MTV Video Music Awards, four NAACP Image Awards, and four Soul Train Music Awards. Time listed her as one of the 100 most influential people in the world in 2018, while Billboard named her Woman of the Year in 2020 and ranked Invasion of Privacy as the top female rap album of the 2010s.

== Early life and education ==
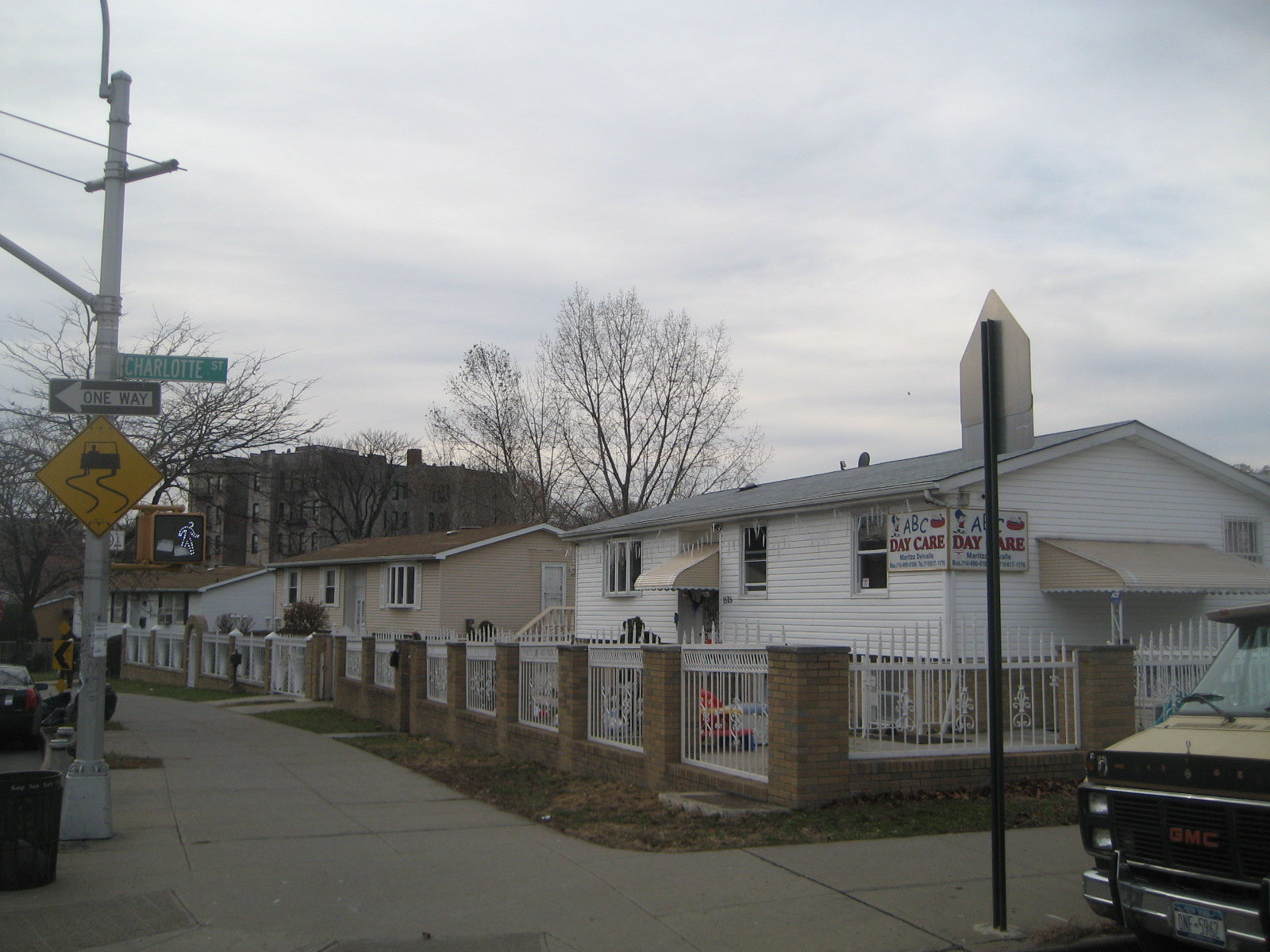
Cardi B was born and raised in the southern part of the South Bronx

Belcalis Marlenis Almánzar was born on October 11, 1992, in the Washington Heights neighborhood of Manhattan, New York City. Her father Carlos is Dominican and her mother Clara is a Trinidadian of multiethnic descent; Almánzar identifies as an Afro-Caribbean. Almánzar was raised in the Highbridge neighborhood of the South Bronx, and spent much time at her paternal grandmother's home in Washington Heights, which she credits with giving her "such a thick accent." Almánzar developed the stage name "Cardi B" as a derivation of Bacardi, a rum brand that was formerly her nickname. She has a younger sister, Hennessy Carolina, who was born in 1995. She has said she was a gang member with the Bloods in her youth, from age 16, but stated she would not encourage joining a gang. She attended Renaissance High School for Musical Theater & Technology, a vocational high school on the Herbert H. Lehman High School campus. Belcalis speaks Dominican Spanish, English, and a small amount of Russian and French.

During her teens, Cardi B was employed at a grocery store in Tribeca. She was fired and became a dancer at a strip club across the street. Cardi B has said that becoming a stripper was positive for her life in many ways: "It really saved me from a lot of things. When I started stripping I went back to school." She stated that she became a stripper to escape poverty and domestic violence, having been in an abusive relationship at the time after being kicked out of her mother's house, and that stripping was her only way to earn enough money to escape the situation and get an education. She attended Borough of Manhattan Community College before eventually dropping out. While stripping, Cardi B lied to her mother by telling her she was making money by babysitting.

In 2013, she began to gain publicity due to several of her videos spreading on social media, on Vine and her Instagram page.

== Career ==
=== 2015–2016: Career beginnings ===
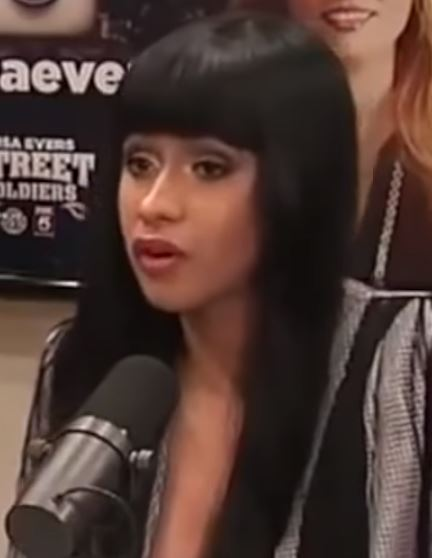
Cardi B interviewing on Street Soldiers with Lisa Evers in January 2016

In 2015, Cardi B joined the cast of the VH1 reality television series Love & Hip Hop: New York, debuting in season six. Jezebel considered her the breakout star of the show's sixth season. The New York Times wrote that she garnered popularity with "her ability to rattle off one-liners". The sixth and seventh seasons chronicle her rise to stardom and her turbulent relationship with her incarcerated fiancé. On December 30, 2016, after two seasons, she announced that she would be leaving the show to further pursue a career in music.

In November 2015, Cardi B made her musical debut on Jamaican reggae fusion singer Shaggy's remix to his single "Boom Boom", alongside fellow Jamaican dancehall singer Popcaan. She made her music video debut on December 15, 2015, with the song "Cheap Ass Weave", her rendition of British rapper Lady Leshurr's "Queen's Speech 4". On March 7, 2016, Cardi B released her first full-length project, a mixtape titled Gangsta Bitch Music, Vol. 1. In November 2016, she was featured on the digital cover of Vibe magazine's "Viva" issue.

On September 12, 2016, KSR Group released the compilation Underestimated: The Album, a collaboration between Cardi B and other KSR Group artists HoodCelebrityy, SwiftOnDemand, Cashflow Harlem, and Josh X. It was previously released only to attendees of their U.S. tour. As the label's flagship artist, Cardi B said: "I wanted to make a song that would make girls dance, twerk and at the same time encourage them to go get that Shmoney," in regard to the compilation's single "What a Girl Likes".

She appeared on the December 9, 2015, episode of Uncommon Sense with Charlamagne. On April 6, 2016, she was on the twelfth episode of Khloé Kardashian's Kocktails with Khloé: in this episode, she revealed how she told her mother that she was a stripper. In November 2016, it was announced that she would be joining the cast of the BET series Being Mary Jane. TVLine describes her character, Mercedes, as a "round-the-way beauty with a big weave, big boobs and a big booty to match her oversize, ratchet personality."

In 2016, Cardi B was featured in her first endorsement deal with Romantic Depot, a large New York chain of lingerie stores that sell sexual health and wellness products. The ad campaign was featured on radio and cable TV.

=== 2017–2018: Breakthrough with Invasion of Privacy ===
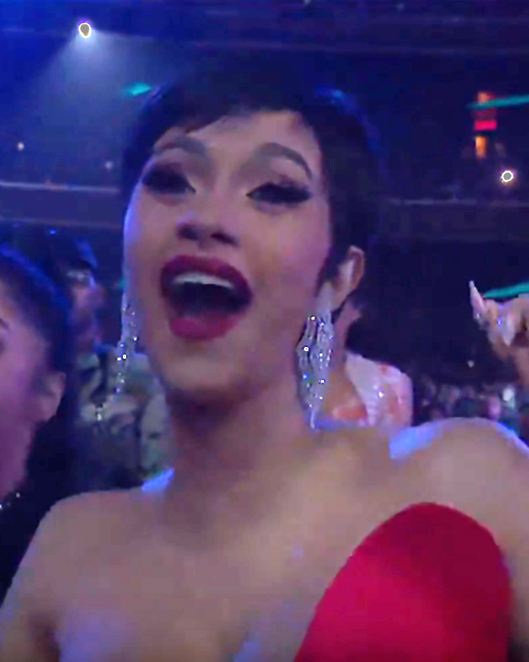
Cardi B at the 2018 MTV Video Music Awards

On January 20, 2017, Cardi B released her second mixtape, Gangsta Bitch Music, Vol. 2. In February 2017, Cardi B partnered with MAC Cosmetics and Rio Uribe's Gypsy Sport for an event for New York Fashion Week. In late February, Cardi B signed her first major record label recording contract with Atlantic Records. On February 25, 2017, Cardi B was the opening act for East Coast hip hop group The Lox's Filthy America... It's Beautiful Tour, alongside fellow New York City-based rappers Lil' Kim and Remy Ma. In April 2017, she was featured in i-D's "A-Z of Music" video sponsored by Marc Jacobs. Cardi guest-starred on the celebrity panel show Hip Hop Squares, appearing on the March 13 and April 3, 2017, episodes. She also released the freestyle "Red Barz".

In May 2017, the nominees for the 2017 BET Awards were announced, revealing that Cardi B had been nominated for Best New Artist and Best Female Hip-Hop Artist. Although Chance the Rapper and Remy Ma won those categories, respectively, Cardi B performed at the BET Awards Afterparty show. On June 11, 2017, during Hot 97's annual Summer Jam music festival, Remy Ma brought out Cardi B, along with The Lady of Rage, MC Lyte, Young M.A, Monie Love, Lil' Kim, and Queen Latifah, to celebrate female rappers and perform Latifah's 1993 hit single "U.N.I.T.Y." about female empowerment. In June 2017, it was revealed that Cardi B would be on the cover of The Fader's Summer Music issue for July/August 2017. She performed at MoMA PS1 on August 19 to a crowd of 4,000.

On June 16, 2017, Atlantic Records released Cardi B's commercial debut single, "Bodak Yellow", via digital distribution. She performed the single on The Wendy Williams Show and Jimmy Kimmel Live! The song climbed the charts for several months, and, on the Billboard Hot 100 chart dated September 25, 2017, "Bodak Yellow" reached the number one spot, making Cardi B the first female rapper to do so with a solo single since Lauryn Hill's "Doo Wop (That Thing)" debuted atop the chart in 1998. The song stayed atop the charts for three consecutive weeks, tying with American pop singer Taylor Swift's "Look What You Made Me Do" as the longest running female at the number one spot in 2017.

Cardi B became the first person of Dominican descent to reach number one in the history of the Hot 100 since it was launched in 1958. An editor of The New York Times called it "the rap anthem of the summer". Selected by The Washington Post and Pitchfork music critics as the best song of 2017, "Bodak Yellow" was eventually certified Diamond by the Recording Industry Association of America (RIAA). The song received nominations for Best Rap Performance and Best Rap Song at the 60th Grammy Awards. It won Single of the Year at the 2017 BET Hip Hop Awards. With her collaborations "No Limit" and "MotorSport", she became the first female rapper to land her first three entries in the top 10 of the Hot 100, and the first female artist to achieve the same on the Hot R&B/Hip-Hop Songs chart. In October 2017, Cardi B headlined Power 105.1's annual Powerhouse music celebration, alongside the Weeknd, Migos, and Lil Uzi Vert, at the Barclays Center in Brooklyn, New York. In December, she released two songs: a collaboration with Puerto Rican singer Ozuna titled "La Modelo", and "Bartier Cardi", the second single from her debut album.

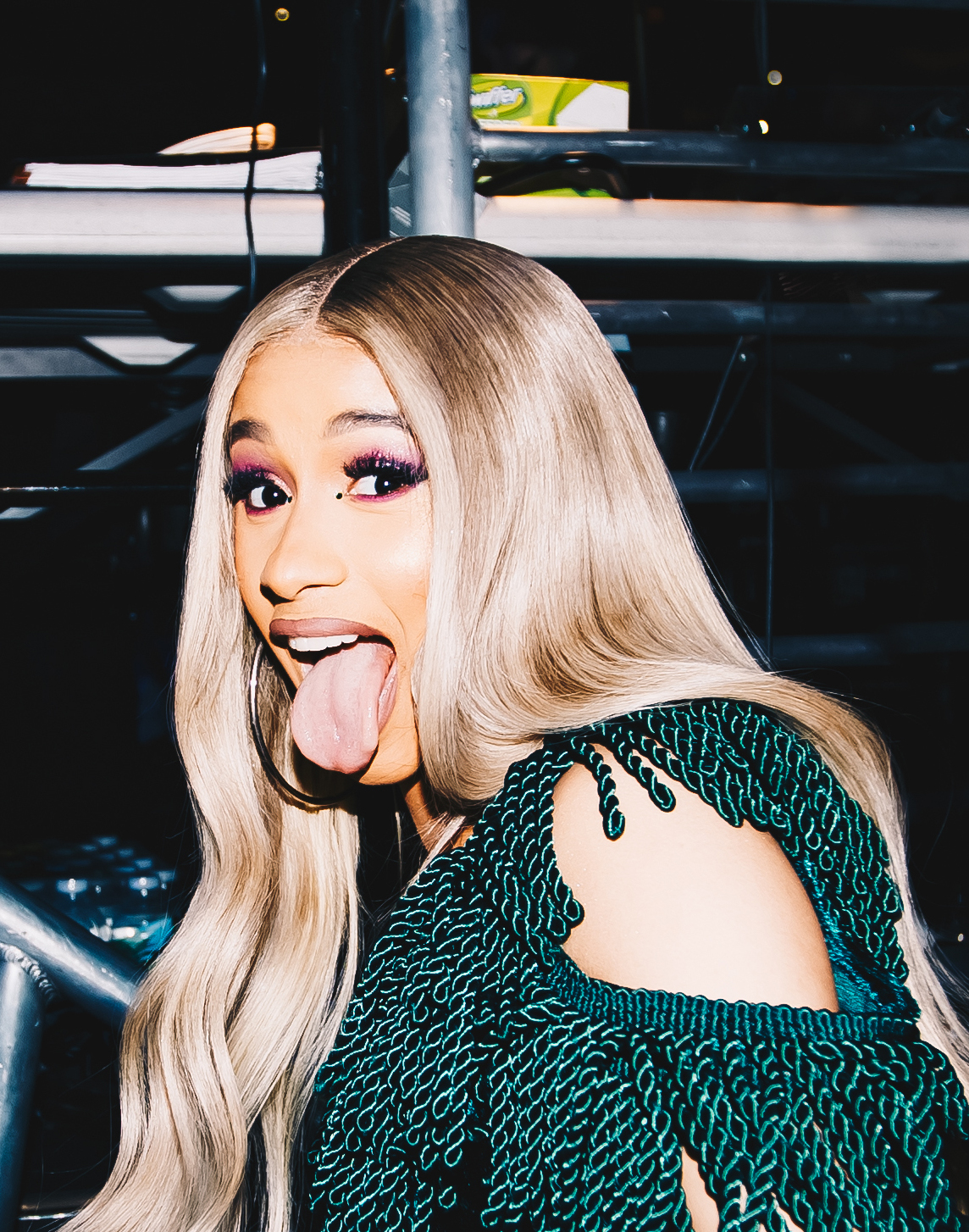
Cardi B backstage at the 2018 Jingle Ball

On January 3, 2018, Cardi B was featured on the remix of Bruno Mars' single "Finesse", and appeared in the 90s inspired video. It reached the top three on the Hot 100, Canada and New Zealand. On January 18, 2018, Cardi B became the first female rapper to have five top 10 singles simultaneously on the Billboard Hot R&B/Hip-Hop Songs chart. She released another single, "Be Careful", on March 30, 2018, a week before her album's release.

Her debut studio album, Invasion of Privacy, was released on April 6, 2018, to universal acclaim from music critics. Editors from Variety and The New York Times called it "one of the most powerful debuts of this millennium" and "a hip-hop album that doesn't sound like any of its temporal peers," respectively. The album entered at number one in the United States, while she became the first female artist to chart 13 entries simultaneously on the Billboard Hot 100, on the chart issue dated April 21. It became the most streamed album by a female artist in a single week in Apple Music, and the largest on-demand audio streaming week ever for an album by a woman. Cardi held the latter record until 2019. The album's title reflects Cardi B's feeling that as she gained popularity her privacy was being invaded in a variety of ways. Following the album's release, during a performance on Saturday Night Live, Cardi B officially announced her pregnancy, after much media speculation. She also co-hosted an episode of The Tonight Show Starring Jimmy Fallon.

After the release of "Girls" in May 2018, a collaboration where she had a featured verse, Cardi B responded to accusations of the song trivializing LGBT relationships; she tweeted, "We never try to cause harm or had bad intentions with the song." She went on to add, "I personally myself had experiences with other women." Several months later, in July 2018, Invasion's fourth single, "I Like It", which features vocals from Bad Bunny and J Balvin, reached number one on the Hot 100; this marked her second number one on the chart and made her the first female rapper to achieve multiple chart-toppers. It received critical acclaim, with Rolling Stone naming it "the best summer song of all time" in 2020. Her collaboration with Maroon 5, "Girls Like You", also reached number one on the Hot 100 chart, extending her record among female rappers and also making her the sixth female artist to achieve three number-one singles on the chart during the 2010s. The song's music video has received more than 3.8 billion views on YouTube and was the fifth-best selling song of the year globally.

With "Girls Like You" following "I Like It" at the top of the Billboard Radio Songs chart, Cardi B became the first female rapper to replace herself at number one on the chart. The single spent seven weeks atop the Hot 100, making Cardi the female rapper with the most cumulative weeks atop the chart, with eleven weeks. It spent 33 weeks in the top 10, tying both Ed Sheeran's "Shape of You" and Post Malone and Swae Lee's "Sunflower" for the longest top 10 run in the chart's archives at the time. In September 2025, Invasion of Privacy was certified six-times platinum by the RIAA. With the thirteen tracks, it became the first album in history to have all of its songs certified platinum or higher in the US.

Cardi B received the most nominations for the 2018 MTV Video Music Awards with 12 mentions—including for Video of the Year, winning three awards. She tied with Drake for the most nominations at the 2018 American Music Awards. She won three AMAs and performed at the ceremony. Her single "Money" earned her a fourth Video Music Award, with visuals that feature Cardi playing characters in different locations, including in an art museum, a bank and a strip club. Her collaboration with DJ Snake "Taki Taki" topped the charts in a number of Hispanic countries, made Cardi B the first female rapper to top the Spotify Global 50 chart, and has garnered more than 2 billion views. Both singles were certified multiple-platinum by the RIAA. People en Español named her Star of the Year, and Entertainment Weekly deemed her "a pop culture phenomenon", as she was named one of "2018 Entertainers of the Year".

On November 30, 2018, Cardi B was honored at Ebony's annual Power 100 Gala. Cardi ranked fifth on the 2018 Billboard Year-End Top Artists chart, while Invasion of Privacy ranked sixth. She achieved the most-streamed album of the year by a female artist globally in Apple Music, and ranked as the most streamed female artist of the year in the United States in Spotify. Editorial staff from Apple Music and Billboard named "I Like It" the best song of 2018, while Time magazine and Rolling Stone named Invasion of Privacy the best album of the year. Also in 2018, Time included her on their annual list of the 100 most influential people in the world. In its decade-end review article, NME stated that the era secured "her crown as the new Queen of Rap."

=== 2019–2020: Hustlers, Rhythm + Flow and "WAP" ===
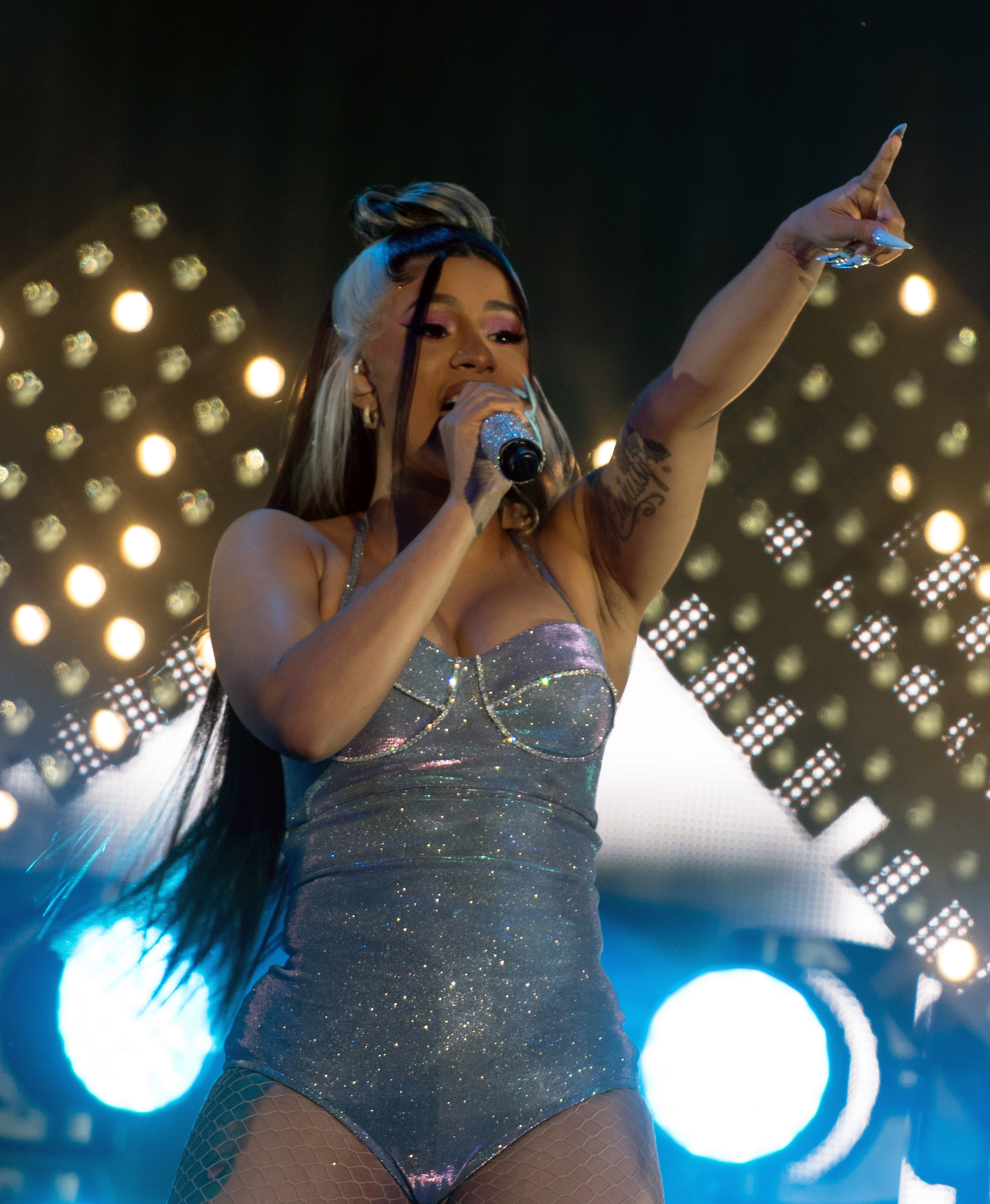
Cardi B performing at the Openair Frauenfeld in July 2019

Cardi B received five nominations at the 61st Grammy Awards, including for Album of the Year, Best Rap Album and Record of the Year ("I Like It"). She became the third female rapper to be nominated for Album of the Year, following Lauryn Hill (1999) and Missy Elliott (2004). On February 10, 2019, she then performed at the award ceremony, where she wore three vintage Thierry Mugler couture looks during the telecast and became the first female rapper to win Best Rap Album as a solo artist. Cardi B led the 2019 Billboard Music Awards nominations, with 21, earning the most nominations in a single year by a female artist and the third most nominations in a year (behind Drake and The Chainsmokers, who both had 22 in a year). She ended up winning six awards, including for Top Hot 100 Song, bringing her career total wins to seven—the most of any female rapper in history. An article by Omaha World-Herald called her "the biggest rapper in the world."

On February 15, 2019, Cardi B released "Please Me", a collaboration with Bruno Mars, which became her seventh top-ten song on the Hot 100, reaching number three. The song marked Cardi and Bruno's second collaboration, following "Finesse" in 2018. The official music video was released two weeks later. On March 1, Cardi set a new attendance record at the Houston Livestock Show and Rodeo, with 75,580 fans in the audience. With "Backin' It Up", "Twerk" and "Money", Cardi became the first female artist to occupy the top three on the Billboard Mainstream R&B/Hip-Hop airplay chart.

Her following single titled "Press" was released on May 31, 2019. The parental-advisory labeled music video marked her directorial debut—being credited as co-director, and was released on June 26, 2019. It had its debut performance at the 2019 BET Awards, where she received the most nominations with seven, and won Album of the Year. During the summer of 2019, she embarked on an arena tour. In September, she led the BET Hip Hop Awards nominations with ten.

Cardi B made her film debut in Hustlers directed by Lorene Scafaria, opposite Jennifer Lopez, Constance Wu, and Lili Reinhart. The film was released on September 13, 2019. Cardi B, along with Chance the Rapper and T.I., were confirmed as judges for the Netflix series Rhythm + Flow, a ten-part hip-hop talent search that premiered on October 9, 2019, which she also executive produced. In December 2019, Cardi B embarked on her first tour of Africa, performing in Nigeria and Ghana. Her collaboration "Clout" was nominated for a Grammy Award for Best Rap Performance. She was the most streamed female rapper of 2019 in the US, according to Spotify. Consequence of Sound deemed her "one of the most formidable hip-hop artists of the decade." In March 2020, Cardi B created a reaction video about the coronavirus pandemic. DJ iMarkkeyz, a Brooklyn DJ known for turning memes and online moments into full-length songs, created a track, based on her reaction titled "Coronavirus", which became an internet meme and was released to music platforms. Netflix announced the return of Rhythm + Flow for 2021.

Cardi B released the single "WAP" featuring American rapper Megan Thee Stallion on August 7, 2020, as the lead single off her forthcoming second studio album. The song received critical acclaim and was praised for its sex positive messages. The Colin Tilley-directed music video accompanied the song itself, and broke the record for the biggest 24-hour debut for an all-female collaboration on YouTube. She became the only female rap artist to top the Global Spotify chart multiple times. "WAP" debuted at number-one on the Billboard Hot 100 chart, garnering Cardi B her fourth chart-topper in the US, extending her record as the female rapper with the most number-one singles, and also making her the first female rapper to achieve Hot 100 number one singles in two different decades (2010s and 2020s).

With 93 million streaming units, it became the largest first-week streams for a song, breaking the all-time record held by Ariana Grande's "7 Rings". It has spent four weeks atop the Hot 100. The single has also spent multiple weeks at number one in seven other countries, including Australia and the United Kingdom. Neil Shah of The Wall Street Journal deemed it "a big moment for female rappers" and "a historic sign that women artists are making their mark on hip-hop like never before". "WAP" became the first number one single on the inaugural Billboard Global 200 chart.

It became critics' best song of the year according to a compilation of rankings made by the BBC, with publications such as Pitchfork and Rolling Stone placing it at number one. Cardi B won the Billboard Music Award for Top Rap Female Artist for the third time at the 2020 ceremony. In December 2020, Cardi B became the first female rapper to be named Woman of the Year at the Billboard Women in Music Awards. With her win for "WAP" at the American Music Awards, she became the first artist to win the American Music Award for Favorite Rap/Hip-Hop Song multiple times, following her win for "Bodak Yellow" in 2018.

=== 2021–2024: Standalone singles and other ventures ===
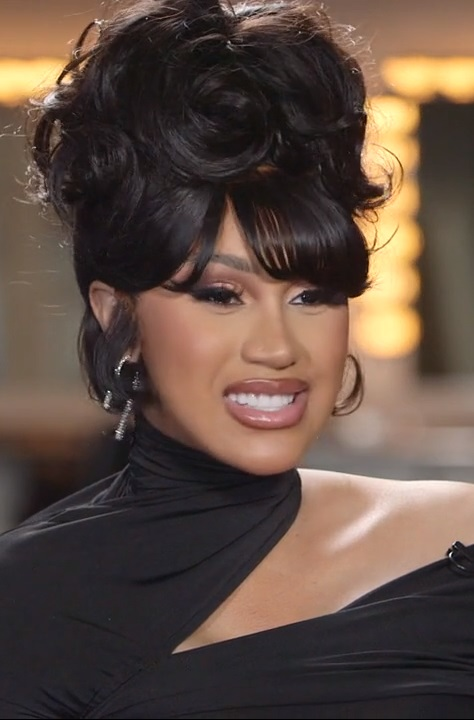
Cardi B in 2021

On February 5, 2021, Cardi B released "Up". The song was praised by NME magazine for its lyricism and fresh approach as a successor to "WAP". "Up" debuted at number two on the US Billboard Hot 100 chart, marking the highest debut for a solo female rap song since Lauryn Hill's "Doo Wop (That Thing)" in 1998. It debuted at number one on the Rolling Stone Top 100, becoming both Cardi B's second number-one single and second number-one debut, as well as the first time a female rapper debuted atop the chart with a solo song. Cardi B became the first female artist and first lead artist with consecutive number-one debuts on the US Hot R&B/Hip-Hop Songs chart, and second overall performer following Drake in 2016. "Up" reached number one on the Billboard Hot 100 after her Grammy Awards performance, making her the only female rapper to reach the summit multiple times with solo songs, following "Bodak Yellow", and extended her record as the female rapper with the most number-one songs on the Hot 100 as her fifth chart-topper. Cardi B received a second nomination for the Brit Award for International Female Solo Artist.

Cardi B made a last-minute appearance in "Big Paper", from DJ Khaled's album Khaled Khaled released on April 30, 2021. She received two nominations for the BET Award for Video of the Year, for the music videos of "Up" and "WAP", winning for the latter and becoming the first female rapper to win Video of the Year as a lead artist. It marked the tenth time that an artist had two nominated videos in this category as a lead act, and the second time for her, following her nominations for "Money" and "Please Me" in 2019. Cardi played a brief role in F9, which was released on June 25, 2021, by Universal Pictures. On July 16, she was featured on the Normani single "Wild Side". Cardi collaborated with Lizzo on "Rumors", which debuted at number four on the Billboard Hot 100, becoming her tenth top-ten single on the chart, and her seventh number-one on the Hot R&B/Hip-Hop Songs chart. She received six nominations at the 2021 MTV Video Music Awards, including her second nomination for Video of the Year. Cardi also led the nominations for the 2021 BET Hip Hop Awards along with Megan Thee Stallion, with nine each; both rappers won the most awards during the ceremony with three for "WAP", with Cardi becoming the first female artist to win Best Hip Hop Video twice (2019 and 2021). On November 21, Cardi B hosted the 2021 American Music Awards (AMAs). The award show was held at the Microsoft Theater in Los Angeles, and marked the most social telecast of the year per interactions across social media. During the ceremony, "Up" won the award for Favorite Hip Hop Song, making Cardi the first artist to win the category three times. She featured on Summer Walker's second studio album Still Over It on the opening track "Bitter", released on November 5, 2021. Cardi co-executive produced Halle Berry's directorial debut, the sports drama Bruised, released via Netflix on November 17. She also performed an original song "Bet It" for the film's soundtrack, released by Warner Records two days after.

In March 2022, Cardi B appeared on the extended version of Summer Walker and SZA's collaboration, "No Love". The following month, she featured on rapper Kay Flock's song, "Shake It"; it samples Akon's 2005 song "Belly Dancer (Bananza)". Also in April, Cardi guest-voiced as Sharki B, her "aquatic alter ego", on "The Seaweed Sway" episode of the Nickelodeon animated series Baby Shark's Big Show!—and performed a song of the same name. She appeared alongside Offset and her daughter. On July 1, 2022, Cardi B released "Hot Shit", featuring rappers Kanye West and Lil Durk. The song was first announced during a BET Awards 2022 commercial break. On July 8 and 9, she headlined the 2022 Wireless Festival in London and Birmingham. Cardi B worked with cousin and fellow rapper GloRilla on the remix to her song "Tomorrow", titled "Tomorrow 2", which was released in September 2022. The remix peaked at number nine on the Billboard Hot 100, becoming Cardi's eleventh top-ten single. HipHopDX listed it as the "Best Hip-Hop Collaboration" of 2022 while it was also the highest-listed song by a female rapper on Billboard's 100 Best Songs of 2022 list. On October 1, Cardi B made a surprise appearance at the Inglewood show of Puerto Rican rapper Bad Bunny's concert tour, the World's Hottest Tour. In November, she signed with entertainment executive Irving Azoff's Full Stop Management. In December 2022, she gave a 35-minute private performance at the Miami Art Basel for which she was paid $1 million. Later that month, a remix of Spanish artist Rosalía's song "Despechá" featuring Cardi, was released.

Cardi B appeared as a surprise performer at the New York City shows of SZA and GloRilla's tours: the SOS Tour and Anyways, Life's Great Tour, in early 2023. In April, she served as one of three headliners of the inaugural Rolling Loud Thailand festival in Pattaya, along with Travis Scott and Chris Brown. In June, she featured on "Put It on da Floor Again", the remix to rapper Latto's "Put It on da Floor". It peaked at number 13 on the Hot 100, becoming Cardi's 20th top-twenty single. On June 4, Cardi B headlined the 2023 Summer Jam festival in Elmont, New York. In July, she featured on "Point Me 2", the remix to drill rapper FendiDa Rappa's single "Point Me to the Slut's". Later that month, she collaborated with Offset on two tracks of his second solo album, Set It Off (2023): "Freaky" and "Jealousy". The latter was released as the lead single of the record; it samples Three 6 Mafia's "Jealous Ass Bitches". On September 8, 2023, Cardi released "Bongos" featuring Megan Thee Stallion, which marks the pair's second collaboration after "WAP" (2020). The music video, directed by Tanu Muino, cost over $2 million. "Bongos" reached number 14 in the US. Cardi led the 2023 BET Hip Hop Awards nominations with 21 Savage, with twelve each. She reprised her voice role as Sharki B for the children's animated film, Baby Shark's Big Movie!, in which she appeared alongside Offset and their two children. It premiered in December on Paramount+ and Nickelodeon. Cardi B co-headlined TikTok's inaugural In the Mix festival on December 10 in Mesa, Arizona, which was released as a concert special on Disney+ and Hulu on December 15. She performed at the Fontainebleau Miami Beach, accompanied by DJ Gryffin, on December 31, 2023, which aired live for the 2024 edition of Dick Clark's New Year's Rockin' Eve.

She released the promotional single "Like What (Freestyle)" on March 1, 2024, with an accompanying music video directed by Offset. Her first solo song since "Up" (2021), it is a freestyle of rapper Missy Elliott's "She's a Bitch" (1999). The track reached the top 40 in the US and became Cardi's 19th top-ten and 11th chart-topper on Hot Rap Songs and Hot Rap Digital Songs. It was followed by "Enough (Miami)" on March 15, which marked her 12th top-ten on the Hot 100 and seventh number-one on the Digital Songs chart. A remix of Flo Milli's "Never Lose Me" was released on the same day, featuring SZA and Cardi B. On March 11, Cardi joined Madonna onstage for a guest appearance at the Inglewood show of her Celebration Tour. She appeared on "Puntería" with Shakira, the opening track and eighth single of the latter's twelfth album Las Mujeres Ya No Lloran, released on March 22, 2024. "Puntería" reached number one on the Latin Airplay chart and topped the Latin Pop Airplay chart for nine weeks. On May 21, Cardi B appeared as a surprise performer at the Madison Square Garden show of Megan Thee Stallion's Hot Girl Summer Tour. She featured on the remix of Thee Stallion and GloRilla's "Wanna Be", released on May 31. In June, Cardi featured on "Put Em in the Fridge" from Peso Pluma's fourth album Éxodo. She co-headlined the BET Experience festival at the Crypto.com Arena on June 28. Her collaboration with Rob49, titled "On Dat Money", was released on July 19. "Enough (Miami)" was nominated for Best Rap Performance at the 67th Annual Grammy Awards.

=== 2025–present: Am I the Drama? ===
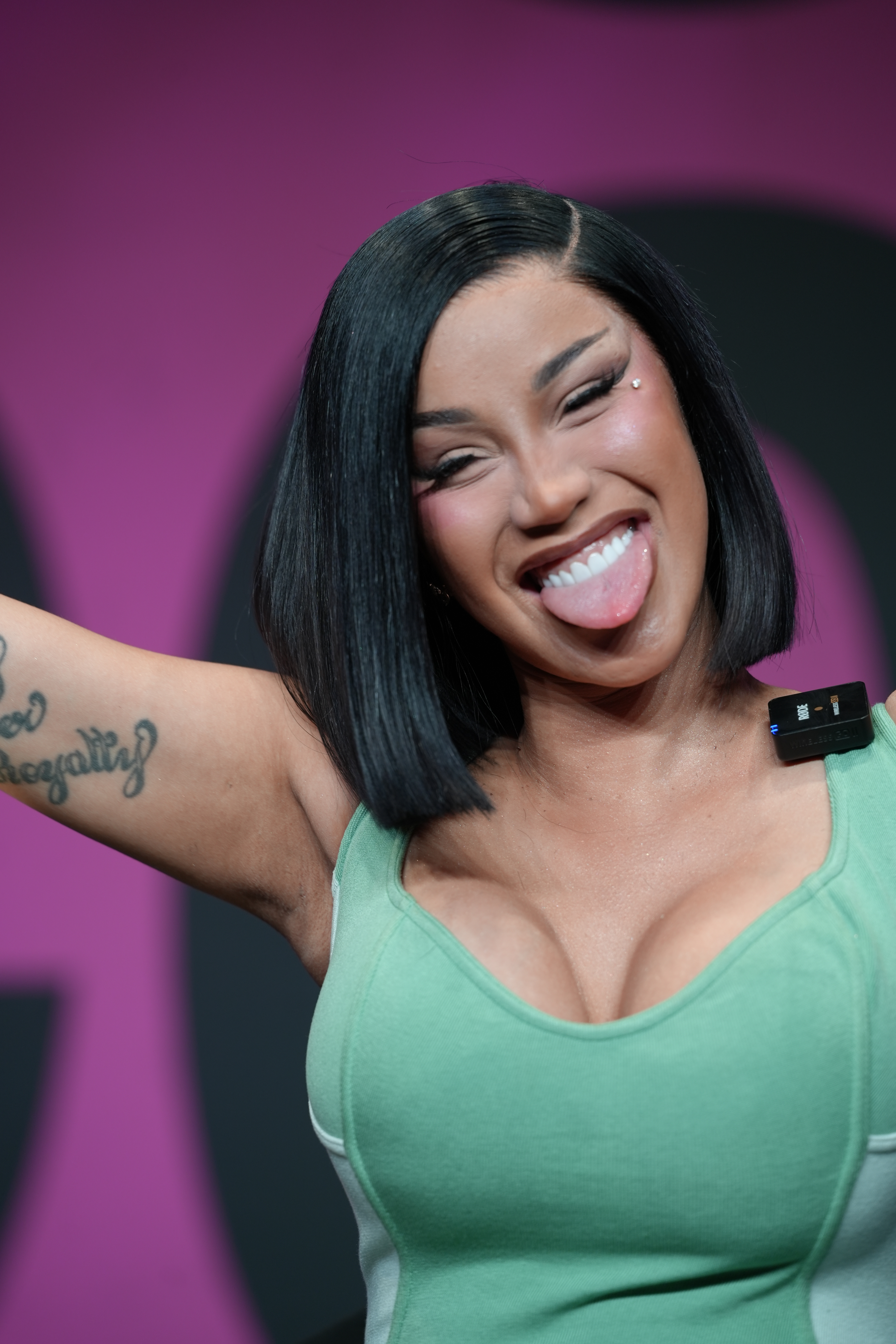
Cardi B in 2026

On February 7, 2025, Cardi and Pardison Fontaine released "Toot It Up". She then featured alongside DJ Khaled, Natania, and Subhi on Desi Trill's "Higher Love", released on February 21 as the lead single of the Smurfs soundtrack. In June 2025, Cardi B headlined the 2025 LadyLand music festival along with FKA Twigs in Brooklyn. She hosted WWE's 2025 SummerSlam event on August 2 and 3 at the MetLife Stadium in East Rutherford, New Jersey. Cardi's second studio album Am I the Drama?, was released on September 19, 2025, over seven years after her debut album. The project was delayed numerous times over multiple years after the release of Invasion of Privacy, citing perfectionism and pressure to live up to expectations. Recorded over a six-year period, the album features 23 tracks, including her previous singles "WAP" and "Up".

It was preceded by the singles "Outside" on June 20 and "Imaginary Playerz" on August 15. The former debuted at number ten on the Billboard Hot 100 and made Cardi the female rapper with the most top-ten debuts on the chart (3), while the latter samples Jay-Z's 1997 track "Imaginary Players". "Safe", featuring Kehlani, was released as the third single in tandem with the album; it became Cardi's tenth number-one on the Billboard Rhythmic Airplay chart. A remix of the track "ErrTime" featuring Jeezy was released in November 2025 as the fourth and final single off the album. Am I the Drama? was met with positive reviews from critics, with Rob Sheffield of Rolling Stone describing it as a "massive comeback triumph". It debuted atop the Billboard 200 with 200,000 album-equivalent units, marking Cardi's second consecutive number-one album and achieving 2025's biggest sales week for an R&B/hip-hop album by a woman. She became the only female rapper in history to have her first two albums debut atop the Billboard 200. The record earned the most entries for a female rap album in Hot 100 history (18 songs), and became the female rap album with the most weeks in the top-ten of the Billboard 200 in the 2020s decade (eight). It was certified triple platinum by the RIAA, becoming the highest-certified female rap album of the 2020s decade and the fastest female album in history to achieve the feat. It was also the fastest album to be certified double platinum in history.

On September 27, Cardi co-headlined the Global Citizen Festival in New York City. On December 13, she headlined the final night of the 2025 Soundstorm Festival in Riyadh, Saudi Arabia. On January 31, 2026, Cardi appeared as the musical guest on the 1,000th episode of Saturday Night Live, hosted by Alexander Skarsgård. In February, she won three awards at the NAACP Image Awards: Outstanding Album for Am I The Drama?, Outstanding Hip-Hop/Rap Song for "ErrTime", and further became the first Hip-Hop artist to win Outstanding Female Artist since Lauryn Hill in 1999. Am I The Drama? is only the third hip-hop album to win Outstanding Album, following Hill's The Miseducation of Lauryn Hill (1999) and Kendrick Lamar's Damn (2017). She was also nominated as Best International Act at the MOBO Awards 2026. In support of Am I the Drama?, Cardi B headlined the Little Miss Drama Tour, spanning 35 arena shows across the US and Canada, from February to April 2026. The tour was met with acclaim from critics, who praised her performance, the production, wardrobe, and visual representation. Paula Mejía of The Guardian described it as an "ambitious spectacle" that successfully translated Cardi's "online-era charisma into a physical arena powerhouse". The Little Miss Drama Tour sold 453,000 tickets and grossed $70 million. Cardi featured on the track "Pocket" off Kehlani's eponymous album, released on April 24, 2026, marking their third collaboration. She won three awards at the 2026 American Music Awards; Best Hip-Hop Album for Am I The Drama?, Best Female Hip-Hop Artist, and Best Hip-Hop Song for "Errtime", expanding her all-time record as the artist with the most wins in the latter category (4). On June 8, Cardi performed at the 2026 NBA Finals' Game 3 halftime show. On June 28, she performed four tracks off Am I The Drama? ("ErrTime", "Hello", "Check Please", and "Pretty & Petty") at the BET Awards 2026; she was the ceremony's most-nominated act with six nods, including Album of the Year, winning Best Female Hip Hop Artist, her third win in the category. Five days later, Cardi headlined the first night of the 2026 Essence Festival of Culture in New Orleans. On July 31, 2026, she released the single "Ah Ha". Her 30th top-ten on the Hot Rap Songs chart, it extended her record for the second-most top-tens among women, and 13th-most top-tens overall. In September, Cardi co-headlined the iHeartRadio Music Festival 2026 and headlined the Create & Cultivate Festival 2026. She won the Best Hip-Hop category at the 2026 MTV Video Music Awards for the music video of her song “Safe” (featuring Kehlani), her fifth career VMA.

== Artistry ==
=== Influences ===
In Billboard's "You Should Know" series, Cardi B said the first albums she ever purchased were by American entertainers Missy Elliott and Tweet, respectively. She has credited Puerto Rican rapper Ivy Queen and Jamaican dancehall artist Spice as influences, as well as Beyoncé, Lady Gaga, Lil' Kim, Madonna, and Selena. She has mentioned Chicago drill music as an important influence. When asked about the initial direction for her music, Cardi B said in an interview,

"When I first started rapping [...] I liked certain songs from Khia and Trina, and they [were] fighting songs. I haven't heard fighting songs for a very long time," crediting the two female rappers for her aggressive rap style. She continued, saying "a lot of girls they cannot afford red bottoms, a lot of girls they cannot afford foreign cars [...] but I know that every girl has beef with a girl [...] I know that every bitch don't like some bitch, and it's like 'that's what I wanna rap about.'"

She credits her experiences growing up in the South Bronx for her success, stating: "I wouldn't be able to rap about the things that I rap about now [if I hadn't grown up there]."

=== Musical style ===
Her debut studio album, Invasion of Privacy, is primarily a hip hop record, which comprises elements of trap, Latin music, and R&B. Her flow was described as "acrobatic and nimble" by Consequence of Sound, and "aggressive" by Newsweek and AllMusic. Stereogum called her vocals an "unabashedly loud and sexual fuck-you New York honk" and "a full-bodied New Yawk nasal bleat, the sort of thing that you've heard if someone has ever told you that you stupid for taking too long at swiping your MetroCard." Pitchfork wrote that her vocal performance in "WAP" is in "her classic throaty style", while Los Angeles Times characterized it as a "staccato bark".

NME described her album as "sexually free" and performed with "rapid" flow. Pitchfork and The Source highlighted the album's punchlines as clever and quotable, and The New York Times called them "classically comedic". In a 2017 Complex article, the editor wrote: "unapologetic does not begin to describe the totally unfiltered and sheer Cardi B-ness of Cardi B's personality. She's a hood chick who's not afraid to be hood no matter the setting ... this is why she resonates with people, and that same energy comes out in her music." She possesses a New York-Dominican accent.

Cardi B has defended her musical content featuring sexually charged lyrics—like most contemporary female rappers; she stated that the content "seems like that's what people want to hear", since she faced negative reactions after releasing her more emotional song, "Be Careful". She has declared, "[Drill music] is the type of artist I always wanted to be: I like to rap about the streets, and I like to rap about my pussy. I don't give a fuck about it." She has stated that writing and performing songs about her personal life and relationships initially caused her a "weird and uncomfortable" feeling and shyness.

== Other ventures ==
=== Products and endorsements ===
In February 2017, she partnered with MAC Cosmetics and Rio Uribe's Gypsy Sport for a New York Fashion Week event. Her April appearance in i-D's "A-Z of Music" video was sponsored by designer Marc Jacobs, and she made the cover of The Fader's July/August 2017 Summer Music issue. Tom Ford's Cardi B-inspired lipstick, named after her, was released in September 2018. It sold out within 24 hours. In November, she released a clothing line collection with Fashion Nova. The same month she partnered with Reebok, promoting the brand's Aztrek sneaker.

In partnership with Reebok, she released a footwear and apparel collection in 2020, inspired by her personal style and paying homage to "classic 80s styling" and motifs. She released her second collection with Reebok in 2021, titled "Let Me Be...In My World", comprising sneakers, tracksuits, and corsets, inspired by everyday life in New York City. The third collection with the brand, "Mommy & Me", was released in May 2021 in recognition of Mother's Day, which includes Cardi's iteration of Club C shoes for adults, children, and infants. The next, titled "Let Me Be...Enchanted" was released in two parts in June and July 2022; it was revealed to be inspired by "a state of enchantment and euphoria" and included crop tops, faux fur jackets, and leotards along with footwear. The fifth and final collection, "Let Me Be...Next Level Energy", was also released in two parts in September and December 2022, concluding her four-year partnership with Reebok. Inspired by Cardi B's "unmatched energy", the collection consisted of bodysuits, crop tops, footwear, leggings, and woven jackets—of a color palette based on crystals.

Cardi B teamed up with Pepsi for three television commercials, which aired during the Super Bowl LIII, the 61st Annual Grammy Awards, and Christmas. In early 2019, Cardi also joined other hip hop artists (including her husband Offset, as part of Migos) in releasing her flavors of snack food Rap Snacks: two flavors of chips, and two of popcorn. The bags' artwork was designed by Jai Manselle and inspired by the cover of Invasion of Privacy. In December 2021, Cardi B partnered with PLBY Group Inc. as creative director in residence for Playboy and founding member of Centerfold, a creator-driven website in the works. The partnership also includes fashion and sexual wellness products.

In February 2023, Cardi B and Offset partnered with McDonald's to create the Cardi B and Offset meal, which was launched on Valentine's Day. The meal was first announced in the 2023 McDonald's Super Bowl commercial which the couple appeared in. In October, she fronted the campaign for Skims' Cotton Collection. The campaign generated over $4 million in media impact value (MIV). In December 2023, Cardi made her runway debut at the Balenciaga fall 2024 show in Los Angeles. In February 2024, she starred in NYX Cosmetics' inaugural Super Bowl commercial for Super Bowl LVIII, titled "Lips Only". An edited version of the advert—centered around the company's Duck Plump lip gloss—was broadcast during the commercial break, due to ribald themes of humor. In May 2024, Cardi appeared alongside sprinter Sha'Carri Richardson in a commercial for the 2024 Summer Olympics. In July, she fronted the Marc Jacobs fall 2024 campaign. In April 2025, Cardi B and e-commerce fashion retailer Revolve Group announced a joint venture under which she will launch apparel and beauty lines. In September 2025, she recorded public service announcements for MTA New York City Transit's subway system. The following month, she joined infant formula company Bobbie as its honorary "Chief Confidence Officer" and starred in the campaign "The B is for Bobbie". In March 2026, Cardi entered a two-year partnership with stevia-based beverage company Zevia as a brand ambassador and shareholder; the company was the lead sponsor for her Little Miss Drama Tour. Her first appearance as the brand's face was in its "Real Talk Interpreter" summer campaign. Later that month, she was the face of Yahoo Mail's "Cardi B Busy" campaign, promoting the email service's new "Planner" feature. In May, she became luxury recommerce brand Fashionphile's global ambassador and released a collection curated by her. The following month, Cardi provided a voiceover to beauty brand EOS's campaign "Just Make Scents", promoting its body care products and fragrances. In August, she fronted the 2026 fall campaign for Old Navy, titled "Most Wanted Denim".

=== Whipshots ===
In collaboration with Starco Brands, Cardi B launched a vodka-infused, vegan whipped cream, called Whipshots, in the US in December 2021. It has sold over five million cans as of March 2024.

=== Cardi Tries ===
She premiered the series Cardi Tries via Facebook Messenger in December 2020, with herself as one of the executive producers. The web series ran for three seasons until April 2023.

=== Grow Good Beauty ===
In February 2026, Cardi B announced the launch of her haircare brand, Grow Good Beauty, her first venture with the Revolve Group. The venture follows years of the artist sharing homemade hair mask recipes and DIY hair care routines on social media. Industry analysts noted that the transition into the beauty space was a "natural evolution" for the rapper, given her long-standing transparency regarding her natural hair journey and her advocacy for hair health within the Afro-Latino community.

According to Women's Wear Daily (WWD), the brand aims to provide "accessible luxury" in the textured hair care market, focusing on hydration, growth, and scalp health. The product lineup is formulated to cater to different hair textures, specifically addressing the needs of those with natural and chemically treated hair. Grow Good Beauty debuted on April 15, 2026, releasing a range of six products—two shampoos, two conditioners, a hair mask, and a serum—on its webstore. The range sold out within the first 45 minutes since launch. Financial experts noted that Cardi's significant digital footprint and "authentic connection" to the subject matter positioned the brand to compete with established celebrity-led beauty brands.

=== Philanthropy ===
In 2022, Cardi B donated $100,000 to the elementary school she attended, I.S. 232 in The Bronx. In the same year, Cardi B pledged to cover the funeral expenses of all 17 victims of the 2022 Bronx apartment fire, as well as repatriation costs for a number of the victims who are to be buried in Gambia.

== Public image ==
=== Political statements ===
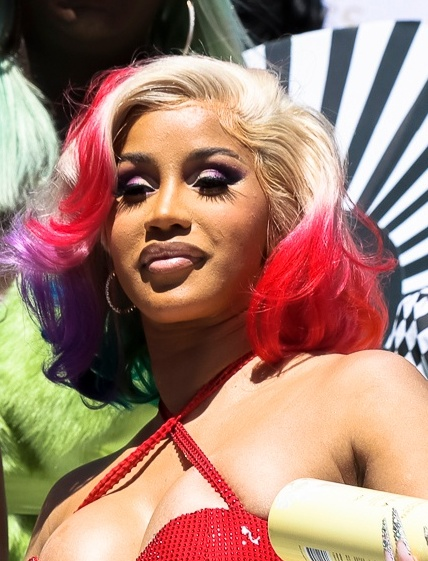
Cardi B at the Weho Pride in West Hollywood, California, in 2022

Cardi B identifies as a feminist. The rapper has been called "unabashedly, directly political" and often uses social media to advocate for causes she believes in, such as gun control. During the 2016 presidential primaries, she warned her fans of Donald Trump's immigration policies and encouraged them to vote for Senator Bernie Sanders. At the Grammy Awards in 2018, she appeared in a video along with Hillary Clinton to narrate a portion of Fire and Fury, Michael Wolff's insider's account of Trump's administration, and stated "Why am I even reading this shit? I can't believe this. I can't believe—this is how he really lives his life?"

Early in 2018, she used her social media to demand transparency on tax policy, asking for detailed information on how her taxpayer dollars are being spent in New York state and criticizing the maintenance of its streets, prisons, and public transportation. Also in 2018, she praised President Franklin D. Roosevelt for advocating for the Social Security program and the New Deal project. She said of Roosevelt, "he helped us get over the Depression, all while he was in a wheelchair. Like, this man was suffering from polio at the time of his presidency, and yet all he was worried about was trying to make America great—make America great again for real. He's the real 'Make America Great Again,' because if it wasn't for him, old people wouldn't even get Social Security." Sanders has praised her for her "leading role" in calling attention to Social Security.

Cardi B endorsed Sanders once again in his second bid for the presidency in the 2020 United States presidential election, while praising U.S. Representative Tim Ryan. She stated that one of the reasons for her endorsement is Sanders' long-time involvement in supporting underprivileged minorities and "people getting Medicare because he knows they can't afford it," while Politico argued that she "might be one of Bernie's most powerful 2020 allies."

In 2020, Cardi B used her social pages to raise awareness for victims of police brutality, and has encouraged people to vote for mayors, judges and district attorneys in local elections. In a conversation with Democratic candidate Joe Biden for Elle, they discussed Medicare, free college tuition, and racial equality. According to a study published by The Hollywood Reporter, Cardi B ranked as the fifth most influential celebrity, and fourth among Generation Z, for the 2020 presidential election.

In late 2023, Cardi B stated she no longer supports Joe Biden for president, saying that she would "not [be] endorsing no fucking presidents no more" as a result of Biden's "spending on wars". In 2024, she endorsed Kamala Harris. She endorsed Jasmine Crockett in the 2026 United States Senate election in Texas.

=== Fashion ===
Cardi has a noted affinity for Christian Louboutin heels, a running theme in her song "Bodak Yellow". She has also mentioned her affinity for cheap, fast fashion brands stating "I don't care if it cost $20 or $15. If it looks good on me, it looks good on me". During an interview in early 2017, Cardi B spoke on being rejected by some fashion designers. Cardi wore vintage Thierry Mugler to the 2019 Grammy Awards, with an i-D article stating that the fashion house's "resurgence onto the fashion scene can almost single-handedly be attributed" to the Swarovski crystal-embroidered crinoline sheath gown she wore at the ceremony.

Mugler's collaboration with Cardi B marked the second time in 25 years that the Paris house opened its archives to dress a celebrity, the first being Beyoncé for her 2009 concert tour. W magazine credited the "WAP" music video for popularizing the Mugler bodysuit in the mainstream. Cardi has acknowledged Mugler as one of the first designers to "take a major chance on [her]" for their fashion collaborations.

Vogue, The Telegraph, Time, and Vibe have referred to her as a fashion icon. An article from Vogue noted she "is famous for her statement getups—whether she's rocking archival Mugler on the red carpet, or dripping in Chanel while sitting courtside at a basketball game." Her over-the-top manicures, designed by nail artist Jenny Bui and studded with Swarovski crystals, have become a part of her signature look. Editor Christian Allaire from the magazine in 2021 commented that her signature "bold" ensembles "create a spectacle" during fashion weeks.

In 2018, she became the first female rapper in the U.S. to appear on the cover of Vogue magazine. Photographed by Annie Leibovitz, the cover, one of four for the January 2019 issue that included Stella McCartney, features her in a red and white Michael Kors dress and matching red Jimmy Choo shoes, while holding her daughter, Kulture.

In 2019, the Council of Fashion Designers of America included her on their list of "28 Black Fashion Forces". Vogue editor-in-chief Anna Wintour commended her fashion sense, declaring that she "completely rethought [her] opinion of Cardi B's style" after the 2019 Met Gala, where the rapper wore a Thom Browne-designed burgundy gown that extends outward in concentric circles for about ten feet and was inspired by the female form.

Cardi B became the face of Balenciaga's ad campaign for the winter 2020 season. The campaign includes billboards in several international locations, such as the Louvre museum. Vogue's Brooke Bobb commented, "This is Cardi's first campaign for a luxury fashion house, though she's definitely no stranger to the Parisian style scene", citing her floral printed Richard Quinn ensemble "that literally covered her from head to toe" and her being "a front row fixture" at high fashion shows, adding, "She and her stylist Kollin Carter have been wildly successful in carving out a much-needed space for Cardi within the fashion industry, and they've cultivated a personal style that is all her own while being inspiring to all".

In 2020, Cardi B became the first female rapper to be awarded by the FN Achievement Awards when she won the Style Influencer of the Year award, which was presented to her by Christian Louboutin. In a press release for the awards show, she was called an "influence on just about everything in pop culture—from music, fashion and style to social media, politics and even public service". In 2022, Rolling Stone ranked her as the second most-stylish woman in music, behind Lady Gaga, and GQ considered her "one of fashion's preeminent risk-takers."

== Impact ==
Cardi B has been referred to as the "Reigning Queen of Hip Hop" by multiple publications, including Billboard, The Hollywood Reporter, Entertainment Weekly, Omaha World-Herald, Black Enterprise, Newsweek, and The A.V. Club, and as the "Queen of Rap" by NME, Essence, Harper's Bazaar Malaysia, The Jakarta Post, Uproxx, iHeartRadio, Geo TV, Vanity Fair, Joe, Boston Herald, Refinery 29, France 24, and Nigerian media The Guardian, BBC News, and Daily Trust.

Spin staff credited her for opening "the table to a new generation of pop artists remaking American music in their own image and accents," as Cardi B "recognized that POC artists no longer need to pander or soften themselves in order to become household names." Billboard editors stated that with "Bodak Yellow"'s commercial success, "she left an indelible mark on the summer of 2017, not only because she rewrote history, but she gave hope to the have nots...". Several publications have credited "I Like It", the first Latin trap song to reach number one on the Hot 100, for introducing the "musical movement" to a mainstream, massive audience. Billboard's Carl Lamarre considered "WAP"'s achievements "a clever Trojan horse for the myriad ways Cardi influences the culture with every move she makes." Billboard noted that from the late 2010s to the early 2020s, "Cardi kept cranking out hits that either crossed over to pop radio (like "Girls Like You" with Maroon 5) or exploded across hip-hop culture (like "WAP" with Megan Thee Stallion), while also dabbling in Hollywood projects and brand deals".

The Wall Street Journal's Neil Shah stated in 2020 that her breakthrough and success influenced "today's female-rap renaissance," while Genius staff credited her for "helping jumpstart a new wave of female hip-hop signings and promotion at labels," and NPR Music commented that the "renaissance" of the dynamism of women in rap grew "in enthusiasm and breadth" since Cardi's "first historic run" in 2017. Similarly, Clover Hope's book The Motherlode (2021) stated that Invasion of Privacy "jump-started a new era for women rappers in which success felt much more tangible" as Cardi B "multiplied the wealth of talent and resurrected the idea that numerous women who controlled their own stories could dominate rap at once."

The New Yorker has credited her for "changing a genre that has rarely allowed for more than one female superstar at a time." Uproxx noted Cardi B for promoting up-and-coming female rappers; "[she is] choosing to use her position at the height of stardom to open doors for other women to flourish in hip-hop at a greater level than any since the Golden Era and 'Ladies First'," considering it "something of a departure from tradition; for the decade previous to Cardi's precipitous come-up, it seemed hip-hop had an unspoken, Highlander-esque rule in place regarding women." Variety deemed her a "hip-hop icon", and The Independent called her "the people's pop culture icon", writing that she "has become one of the most recognisable cultural figures of the past 10 years". In 2024, Billboard included Cardi B among the honorable mentions of its "25 Greatest Pop Stars of the 21st Century" listicle. The magazine called her one of the "most influential female rappers ever, and one of the most bankable hit-makers across all of hip-hop".

NPR defined "Cardi B effect" as "a branding power rooted in specific authenticity, created and permeated by rapper Cardi B" and noticed that with her breakthrough, "brands finally started to become hip to [her] effect, noticing the cultural markers outside of the rap world that were proving it wasn't limited to clubs, concerts and radio." Business magazine Inc. stated that her success "shows how social media changed everything we knew about traditional marketing and media", which no longer relies on a "well-thought marketing scheme or millions of dollars in advertising." In 2019, a life-sized sculpture of her was on display at the Brooklyn Museum, as part of Spotify's RapCaviar "Pantheon".

Bloomberg News reported that her data bill helped to boost Ghana's GDP growth in 2019, after it was part of a concert tour. She inspired the creation of the sitcom Partners in Rhyme, executively produced by MC Lyte about a young woman in high school who "aspires to be the next Cardi B." P-Valley creator and executive producer Katori Hall cited her an inspiration for the TV series, and credited her for "helping prepare the public" for its storyline.

Several artists have cited Cardi B's work as an inspiration, including Rosalía, Olivia Rodrigo, Jazmine Sullivan, Selena Gomez, Blackpink, Spice, Greta Gerwig, Nathy Peluso, Rubi Rose, María Becerra, and Abigail Asante. Cardi B has been credited for supporting and uniting female rappers in the industry, with a writer from Uproxx considering her co-sign "the new Drake effect" for women in hip hop.

== Achievements ==
Cardi B is the recipient of numerous accolades, including a Grammy Award, eight Billboard Music Awards (including three consecutive Top Rap Female Artist wins), eight Guinness World Records, nine American Music Awards, five MTV Video Music Awards, seven BET Awards (including Album of the Year), and fourteen BET Hip Hop Awards. Invasion of Privacy—which made her the first female rapper to win the Grammy Award for Best Rap Album as a solo artist—became the first female rap album in fifteen years to be nominated for a Grammy Award for Album of the Year.

Time included her on their annual list of the 100 most influential people in the world in 2018. She received the ASCAP award for Songwriter of the Year in 2019, becoming the first female rapper to win the award. She received the honor for the second time in 2020, making her the first female songwriter to win the award twice. In 2020, Cardi B became the first female rapper to be named Woman of the Year at the Billboard Women in Music Awards.

Cardi B is the female rapper with the most Billboard Hot 100 number one singles (5) and the one with the most total weeks on the top position (16). "I Like It" became the first song led by a female rapper to surpass a billion streams on Spotify, making her the first woman in hip hop with multiple billion-streamers on the service, and the female rapper with the second-most, with a total of four so far. With the singles "Taki Taki" and "WAP" she became the only female rapper to top the global Spotify chart multiple times. Since August 2020, "WAP" holds the record of the biggest first-week streams for a song in the United States. Invasion of Privacy was the top female rap album of the 2010s, according to the Billboard 200 decade-end chart. It became the longest-charting album by a female rapper on the Billboard 200, and the most-streamed female rap album on Spotify.

Cardi is the female rapper with the most (4) Diamond-certified songs by the Recording Industry Association of America (RIAA): "Bodak Yellow", which made her the first female rapper to have a song certified Diamond; "Girls Like You", which made her the first female rapper to achieve multiple Diamond-certified songs; "I Like It", a tie for the second-most among women artists; and "WAP", which is the only female rap collaboration to be certified diamond. Cardi B has topped twice Pitchfork's annual list of best songs of the year (2017 and 2020). Billboard staff and Rolling Stone ranked her debut album number 13 and 34 on their critics' lists of the best albums of the 2010s respectively, both the highest rank for a female rapper for the decade. Cardi B has become the highest-certified female rapper of all time on the RIAA's Top Artists (Digital Singles) ranking, with 69 million certified units, also being among the highest-certified female artists overall. In October 2022, five years after her major-label debut, she reached 100 million units sold in RIAA certifications, across her album, singles and guest appearances.

In the US, Cardi has achieved three times the best-performing song of the year by a female artist—the first act to do so this century—in 2017, 2018, and 2020. As of 2021, "I Like It" is the most-streamed song by a female rapper in the United Kingdom. In August 2021, "Bodak Yellow" made Cardi B the first female rapper to have two videos on her YouTube channel with more than 1 billion views, joining "I Like It", and became the fastest solo female rap song to reach that mark on the platform. She has the most-viewed music videos on YouTube, both as a solo act and feature, among female rappers ("Bodak Yellow"; "Girls Like You"). As of September 2024, she has one music video with over 3 billion views ("Girls Like You"); one video with over 2 billion views ("Taki Taki"); and three videos with over a billion views ("I Like It", "Bodak Yellow", "Girls Like You (Volume 2)") on YouTube. Cardi is the only female rapper ranked on Billboard's Greatest Hot 100 Hits of All Time, with "Girls Like You" at number 30.

Cardi B's sophomore studio album, Am I the Drama? (2025), achieved significant commercial and critical success upon its release. The album debuted at number one on the US Billboard 200, earning 200,000 album-equivalent units in its first week. This milestone made her the only female rapper in history to have her first two studio albums debut at the top of the chart. The project also set a record for the most charting songs by a female rapper in a single week on the Billboard Hot 100, with 18 tracks entering the tally simultaneously.

The album was certified platinum by the Recording Industry Association of America (RIAA) on its day of release, a feat attributed to the pre-release success of the singles "WAP" and "Up". By February 2026, the album had been certified double platinum, making it the highest-certified female rap album of the 2020s decade thus far.

== Personal life ==
Cardi B has defined herself as a practicing Catholic.

In 2016, Cardi B said that when working as a stripper, she used to drug and rob men for their money. Following controversies on the matter, sparked in 2019, she defended herself, saying, "whether or not they were poor choices at the time, I did what I had to do to survive." She explains: "I never glorified the things I brought up in that live [video], I never even put those things in my music because I'm not proud of it and feel a responsibility not to glorify it. I made the choices that I did at the time because I had very limited options." In 2024, Cardi B spoke on the matter again, saying "Why do y'all keep writing 'Cardi drugged, whatever, robbed men,' other crap. So what? I'll do it again bitch. I don't give a fuck, I don't feel bad. I don't feel bad for no niggas. I'll do it the fuck again. And y'all think y'all gagging. I talk about that shit on my album too. I don't give a fuck."

She identifies as bisexual. In connection with the MeToo movement, she has discussed being sexually assaulted in the past while working as a stripper.

In a 2018 interview, Cardi B talked about being Afro-Latina and Afro-Caribbean:

We are Caribbean people. [...] Some people want to decide if you're black or not, depending on your skin complexion, because they don't understand Caribbean people or our culture. [...] I don't got to tell you that I'm black. I expect you to know about it. When my father taught me about Caribbean countries, he told me that Europeans took over our lands. That's why we all speak different languages. [...] Just like everybody else, we came over here the same way. I hate when people try to take my roots from me. Because we know that there's African roots inside of us.

Rapper GloRilla is Cardi's biological first cousin (once removed) due to Glorilla's father being a half-sibling to one of Cardi's parents, but referred to her as her "half-niece". Glorilla also confirmed they are cousins. Cardi B has also been involved in a widely publicized feud with rapper Nicki Minaj since around 2017.

=== Relationships ===
In early 2017, Cardi B began dating fellow rapper Offset. They became engaged on October 27, 2017. On April 7, 2018, during her second performance on Saturday Night Live, Cardi B revealed her pregnancy; she was about six months (24 weeks) pregnant at the time. On June 25, 2018, TMZ found a marriage license revealing Cardi B and Offset had actually secretly married in September 2017, one month before the public proposal. She later confirmed this in a social media post.

Cardi B gave birth to a daughter on July 10, 2018. In December 2018, she announced on Instagram that she and Offset had separated, though the pair later reunited. In February 2019, the couple made a public appearance for the Grammys. He accompanied her onstage during her acceptance speech for Best Rap Album.

In September 2020, it was reported that Cardi B had filed for divorce from Offset, but the following month it was revealed they were back together. In June 2021, Cardi B revealed she was pregnant with her second child, a boy. She gave birth to a son on September 4, 2021. On the fifth anniversary of her marriage, Cardi B announced she was planning her official wedding. In December 2023, Cardi shared via Instagram that she had been "single for a minute," confirming that she and Offset were no longer together. However, by March 2024, the status of their marriage became unclear as they were still working together, with Offset having directed a music video for Cardi B. In July 2024, Cardi officially filed for divorce from Offset. She announced her third pregnancy the day after. She gave birth to her third child, a daughter, on September 7, 2024.

In October 2024, Cardi was rumored to be in a relationship with NFL player Stefon Diggs. On June 1, 2025, she publicly confirmed her relationship with Diggs in an Instagram post with photos with them together. On September 17, 2025, in an interview with Gayle King, Cardi confirmed she was pregnant with her fourth child, also her first with Diggs. She gave birth to a son in November of that year. In February 2026, Cardi confirmed that she and Diggs had split.

In September 2026, Almánzar was reportedly dating Nigerian soccer player, Maduka Okoye.

=== Legal issues ===
On October 1, 2018, Cardi B was accused of an alleged assault of two female bartenders. The victims claimed that Cardi B and her entourage "threw bottles and alcohol at them." She denied involvement. She was charged with two misdemeanors: assault and reckless endangerment. Cardi B appeared in court for her arraignment on December 7, 2018, after she did not show up for the originally scheduled date due to a scheduling conflict, according to her attorney. On June 21, 2019, a jury indicted Cardi B on 14 charges, including two counts of felony assault with intent to cause serious physical injury, stemming from the incident. She was arraigned on June 25, 2019, and pleaded not guilty on all charges. On September 15, 2022, she pleaded guilty to third-degree assault and second-degree reckless endangerment, resulting in a sentence of 15 days of community service.

On January 24, 2022, Cardi won a million-dollar defamation verdict against YouTuber Latasha Kebe (Tasha K) for waging a "malicious campaign" to hurt her reputation by posting false rumors. She stated that the lies had led her to contemplate suicide in 2019. The jury issued a verdict that Cardi B had been defamed and awarded $1.25 million in damages. Further proceedings brought the total fine against Kebe to $3.82 million.

On March 25, 2022, Cardi, her sister Hennessy, and Hennessy's girlfriend won a defamation lawsuit filed against them by three men over an incident at a Suffolk County beach.

In July 2023, Cardi B threw her microphone into the crowd at a Las Vegas concert of hers after a fan threw a liquid at her. Subsequently, one fan attempted to press charges but the Clark County Police Department following an investigation decided not to move forward with a case.

== Discography ==
Studio albums

- Invasion of Privacy (2018)
- Am I the Drama? (2025)

== Tours and residencies ==
Headlining tours

- 2019 Tour
- Little Miss Drama Tour (2026)

Residencies

- Cardi B at KAOS (2019)

== Filmography ==
Television
Year	Title	Role	Notes
2015–2017	Love & Hip Hop: New York	Herself	Main cast
2017	Being Mary Jane	Mercedes	Episode: "Getting Real"
2017	Hip Hop Squares	Herself	Panelist; episodes: "Ray J vs Princess Love", "Jessica White vs Joe Budden"
2018	Saturday Night Live	Herself (musical guest)	Episode: "Chadwick Boseman/Cardi B"
2018	The Tonight Show Starring Jimmy Fallon	Herself	Co-host; episode: "Cardi B/John Mulaney"
2019	Untold Stories of Hip Hop	Herself	Episode: "Cardi B & Snoop Dogg"; docuseries
2019	Rhythm + Flow	Herself	Judge; reality show; also executive producer
2020–2023	Cardi Tries	Herself	Host; web reality series; also creator and executive producer
2021	Last Week Tonight with John Oliver	Herself	Episode: "Union Busting"
2022	Baby Shark's Big Show!	Sharki B	Episode: "The Seaweed Sway"
2023	TikTok: In the Mix	Herself	Performer; television concert special
2026	Saturday Night Live	Herself (musical guest) / Joaquin's wife	Episode: "Alexander Skarsgård/Cardi B"

Film
Year	Title	Role	Notes
2019	Hustlers	Diamond	
2021	F9	Leysa	
2023	Renaissance: A Film by Beyoncé	Herself	Cameo
2023	Baby Shark's Big Movie	Sharki B	

=== Commercials ===
Year	Product(s)	Brand(s)	Role	Ref.
2018	Fashion Nova x Cardi B	Fashion Nova	Herself	
2018	Aztrek sneaker	Reebok	Herself	
2019	Cheddar BBQ and Jerk BBQ chips as well as Honey Drip Butter and Habanero Hot Cheese popcorn	Rap Snacks	with Offset	
2019		Pepsi	Herself	
2020	Footwear and apparel collection	Reebok	Herself	
2021	"Let Me Be...In My World" collection	Reebok	Herself	
2021	Mocha, Vanilla and Caramel flavored vodka infused whipped cream	Whipshots	Herself	
2022	"Let Me Be...Next Level Energy" collection	Reebok	Herself	
2023	Cardi B & Offset Meal	McDonald's	with Offset	
2023	Skims' Cotton Collection campaign	Skims	Herself	

== See also ==
- Afro-Caribbean music
- Black Hispanic and Latino Americans
- Dominican Americans – Americans of Dominican (Dominican Republic) birth or descent
- Hispanics and Latinos in New York
- LGBTQ culture in New York City
- List of artists who reached number one in the United States
- List of highest-certified music artists in the United States
- List of LGBTQ people from New York City
- List of most-followed Instagram accounts
- NYC Pride March – Event celebrating the LGBTQ community
