= Billboard Music Award for Top Rap Female Artist =

Annual American music award

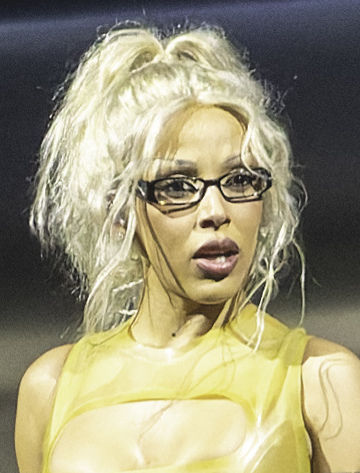
- Doja Cat is the most recent recipient
- Country: United States
- Presented by: Billboard
- First award: 2018
- Currently held by: Doja Cat (2024)

Highlights
- Most wins: Cardi B (3)
- Most nominations: Cardi B (5)
- Website: billboardmusicawards.com

The following list shows the winners and nominees for the Billboard Music Award for Top Rap Female Artist. First given in 2018, Cardi B was the first winner and has won this award three times.

== Winners and nominees ==
Winners are listed first and highlighted in bold.

Year	Artist	Ref.
2018	**Cardi B**	
2018	Nicki Minaj	
2018	Bhad Bhabie	
2019	**Cardi B**	
2019	Nicki Minaj	
2019	City Girls	
2020	**Cardi B**	
2020	City Girls	
2020	Megan Thee Stallion	
2021	**Megan Thee Stallion**	
2021	Cardi B	
2021	Saweetie	
2022	**Megan Thee Stallion**	
2022	Cardi B	
2022	Latto	
2023	**Nicki Minaj**	
2023	Doja Cat	
2023	Ice Spice	
2024	**Doja Cat**	
2024	GloRilla	
2024	Nicki Minaj	
