= Gangsta Bitch Music, Vol. 2 =

2017 mixtape by Cardi B

Mixtape by Cardi B
- Released: January 20, 2017
- Genre: Hip-hop
- Length: 28:26
- Label: KSR

Cardi B chronology
Gangsta Bitch Music, Vol. 1 (2016)	Gangsta Bitch Music, Vol. 2 (2017)	Invasion of Privacy (2018)

Singles from Gangsta Bitch Music, Vol. 2
- 1. "Bronx Season" Released: September 15, 2016

Gangsta Bitch Music, Vol. 2 is the second mixtape by American rapper Cardi B. It was the follow-up mixtape to her debut mixtape, Gangsta Bitch Music, Vol. 1. It was released on January 20, 2017, by KSR. The mixtape, a hip-hop record, features guest appearances from Migos member and then-spouse Offset, DJ Hardwerk, Justvlad, Konshens, Hoodcelebrityy, Josh X, and Casanova.

"Bronx Season" was released as the mixtape's sole single on the 15th of September, 2016. Upon its release, the mixtape charted at number 25 on Billboard's Independent Albums chart and peaked at number 6 on their Heatseekers Albums chart, with both charts based in the United States of America. The mixtape also won in the Best Mixtape category at the 2017 BET Hip Hop Awards.

== Accolades ==
Award	Year (Note: Indicates the year of ceremony. Each year is linked to the article about the awards held that year, wherever possible.)	Category	Result	Ref.
BET Hip Hop Awards	2017	Best Mixtape	Won	

== Track listing ==
Gangsta Bitch Music, Vol. 2
No.	Title	Length
1.	"Bronx Season"	2:22
2.	"Lick" (featuring Offset)	3:53
3.	"Hectic" (featuring DJ Hardwerk)	2:52
4.	"Leave That Bitch Alone" (Skit) (featuring Justvlad)	1:27
5.	"Leave That Bitch Alone"	2:47
6.	"Rollin"	3:34
7.	"Back It Up" (featuring Konshens and Hoodcelebrityy)	2:37
8.	"Never Give Up" (featuring Josh X)	2:39
9.	"Pull Up"	2:42
10.	"Pop Off" (featuring Casanova)	3:33

== Charts ==
Chart (2017)	Peak position
US Heatseekers Albums (Billboard)	6
US Independent Albums (Billboard)	25
