= Josh X =

American singer-songwriter

- Born: Josh Xantus; Brooklyn, New York City
- Genres: Hip hop; trap; R&B
- Occupations: Singer; songwriter; record producer
- Instruments: Vocals; piano
- Years active: 2009–present
- Labels: KSR; Epic
- Website: joshxantusmusic.com

Josh Xantus, known professionally as Josh X, is a Haitian-American singer, songwriter, and record producer. He is best known for his single Heaven on My Mind.

== Early life and education ==
Xantus was born in Brooklyn, New York City and raised by a single mother in Queens. He began playing classical piano at age six and composed his first song at age 13. He attended the summer program at the Juilliard School and after receiving a full college scholarship, graduated from Five Towns College in Long Island, NY.

He cites Brian McKnight as his favorite singer.

== Career ==
While in Los Angeles in 2009, Xantus performed his single "First Time" for Stevie Wonder, who praised his work, telling him to "continue to carry out the legacy of being a musician that represents real music."

In 2015, he co-wrote the track "Ready to Go" with Swizz Beatz for Pepsi and Fox's Empire and released his debut single "All for Love" featuring Jadakiss. That same year, he began writing and producing for rapper Cardi B, and collaborated on the tracks "Selfish", "Island Girls", and "Heaven on My Mind" the following year. "Heaven on My Mind" ranked at No. 22 on the Billboard Adult R&B Songs charts in January 2017. He continued working with Cardi B for three years. In 2018, Xantus signed with record label Epic Records and released the single "All On Me" featuring Rick Ross. The music video received over 3.7 million views on YouTube.

== Discography ==
Year	Title	Label	Other Artist(s)	Notes
2015	All For Love	Independent	Jadakiss	(as Josh Xantus)
2016	Bussin' Plays	Majic City Network	Monee Baggz	
2016	Island Girls	KSR Group	Cardi B, Young Chow	
2016	Heaven on My Mind	KSR Group	Cardi B	
2016	Selfish	KSR Group	Cardi B	Featured artist
2017	Amour	KSR Group	Dro	EP
2017	First Time	Taken Over Sound		
	Never Give Up	KSR Group	Cardi B	Featured artist
2018	All On Me	Epic Records	Rick Ross	
2018	Love Lost	Female Shotta Records	HoodCelebrityy	
2021	Lights	Andrea Production	Andrea (Bulgarian singer)	Featured artist
