= Little Miss Drama Tour =

2026 concert tour by Cardi B

- Tour by Cardi B
- Location: Canada; US
- Associated album: Am I the Drama?
- Start date: February 11, 2026
- End date: April 18, 2026
- No. of shows: 35
- Attendance: 453,043
- Box office: $70.03 million

Cardi B concert chronology
- 2019 Tour (2019); Little Miss Drama Tour (2026)

The Little Miss Drama Tour was a concert tour by the American rapper Cardi B, in support of her second studio album, Am I the Drama? (2025). The tour commenced on February 11, 2026, in Palm Desert, California, and concluded on April 18 of the same year in Atlanta, Georgia, consisting of 35 concerts. It sold 453,000 tickets and grossed $70 million across 35 dates.

== Background ==
On June 22, 2025, Cardi B announced that her second studio album, Am I the Drama?, would be released on September 19. As part of her pre-release rollout, she co-hosted the September 16 episode of Today with Jenna & Friends, in which she revealed that she would go on tour across 30 cities in the US and Canada in promotion of the album.

== Commercial performance ==
=== Ticket sales ===
In February 2026, Cardi B became the first female rapper in history to sell out two consecutive nights at the Kia Forum in Inglewood, California. The performances served as the opening weekend for her Little Miss Drama Tour, featuring a 37-song setlist and elaborate stage production that included the artist being suspended above the audience. The concerts featured several guest appearances, including performances by GloRilla, Kehlani, Tyla, and Blueface. During the first show, she performed the song "Pretty & Petty," which was widely interpreted by media outlets as a diss track directed at rapper Bia. Following the Los Angeles shows, Cardi B continued the tour with a streak of thirty five consecutive sold-out performances across North America. It became the highest-grossing tour by a female rapper in California, earning $9.4 million from 59,300 tickets sold across five shows in the state. It is the first tour by a female rapper in history to gross over $5 million at a single venue, with $5.325 million across two shows at Madison Square Garden in New York on March 25–26, 2026. The tour sold 453,000 tickets and grossed $70 million across 35 dates in 32 cities, becoming the highest-grossing debut arena tour by a female rapper.

=== Critical reception ===
The Little Miss Drama Tour received widespread acclaim from music critics, who lauded the production's ambition, Cardi B's stamina, and the show's theatrical scale. Writing for The Guardian, Paula Mejía awarded the Los Angeles performance four out of five stars, describing it as an "ambitious spectacle" that successfully translated the rapper's "online-era charisma into a physical arena powerhouse." Mejía highlighted the setlist's "vigorous score-settling," specifically noting that the performance of "Pretty & Petty" was delivered with a "brutally witty" energy that solidified the show's title theme.

Tomás Mier of Billboard characterized the opening night as a "tour de force," noting that the 37-track setlist was designed to showcase the breadth of her discography while maintaining a consistent "baddie energy" throughout. Mier praised the pacing of the show, stating that despite the high volume of songs, the production never felt "cluttered," largely due to the "seamless transitions" between various aesthetic "chapters" of the performance.

The tour's visual presentation and wardrobe also became a focal point for international media. News.com.au reported on the "very racy" nature of the stage outfits, describing the fashion as a "high-octane blend of high drama and fearless confidence." The publication highlighted a "bold, sheer dress" and various "cut-out bodysuits" that were designed to emphasize the "unapologetic femininity" that has defined Cardi B's public persona. Furthermore, critics noted that the stage design–which included pyrotechnics and a floating platform–elevated the show beyond a standard rap concert into a "fully-realized theatrical event." While the majority of reviews were positive, some journalists pointed out minor logistical "kinks" during the early dates, though Mejía noted that Cardi B's "improvisational humor" during technical moments only served to further "humanize the superstar."

== Set list ==
This set list is from the concert in Palm Desert on February 11, 2026. It is not intended to represent a majority of the concerts throughout the tour.

1. "Hello"
2. "Magnet"
3. "Salute"
4. "Check Please"
5. "Trophies"
6. "Enough (Miami)"
7. "Money"
8. "Press"
9. "Man of Your Word" (intro)
10. "Be Careful"
11. "Ring"
12. "Thru Your Phone"
13. "Killin You Hoes"
14. "On My Back"
15. "Safe"
16. "Taki Taki"
17. "Bongos"
18. "Bodega Baddie"
19. "I Like It"
20. "La Modelo"
21. "Please Me"
22. "Principal"
23. "Pick It Up"
24. "Better than You" / "Nice Guy"
25. "Up"
26. "Imaginary Playerz"
27. "ErrTime"
28. "On Dat Money"
29. "No Limit"
30. "Thotiana"
31. "Pretty & Petty"
32. "WAP"
  Encore
33. "Girls Like You"
34. "Finesse"
35. "Tomorrow 2"
36. "Bartier Cardi"
37. "Outside"
38. "Bodak Yellow"

=== Additional notes ===
On select dates, Cardi B performs a duet with special guests.

- February 15, 2026 – Inglewood: "Tomorrow 2" with GloRilla
- February 16, 2026 – Inglewood: "Safe" and "Folded" with Kehlani; "Nice Guy" and "Chanel" with Tyla; "Thotiana" with Blueface
- March 4, 2026 – Houston: "On Dat Money" with Rob49; "WAP" with Megan Thee Stallion
- March 15, 2026 – Detroit: "Here I Go" with Kash Doll
- March 25, 2026 – New York City: "Fisherrr" and "Hoes Be Mad" with Cash Cobain; "Quiet Storm" with Lil' Kim; "Doin What I Want" with Natalie Nunn
- March 26, 2026 – New York City: "Jungle" and "Look Back at It" with A Boogie wit da Hoodie; "Backin' It Up" with Pardison Fontaine
- March 28, 2026 – Newark: "Trap Queen" with Fetty Wap
- April 7, 2026 – Philadelphia: "Dreams and Nightmares" with Meek Mill
- April 14, 2026 – Sunrise: "T-Shirt" with Quavo; "Taki Taki" with Ozuna; "Fever" with Vybz Kartel; "Look Back at Me" with Trina

== Shows ==
List of 2026 concerts
Date (2026)	City	Country	Venue	Attendance	Revenue
February 11	Palm Desert	United States	Acrisure Arena	8,481 / 8,481	$1,183,047
February 13	Paradise (Note: Labeled as Las Vegas in promotional material.)	United States	T-Mobile Arena	13,839 / 13,839	$1,888,618
February 15	Inglewood (Note: Labeled as Los Angeles in promotional material.)	United States	Kia Forum	25,745 / 25,745	$4,058,627
February 16	Inglewood	United States	Kia Forum	25,745 / 25,745	$4,058,627
February 19	Portland	United States	Moda Center	12,387 / 12,387	$1,339,156
February 21	Vancouver	Canada	Rogers Arena	13,145 / 13,145	$1,385,156
February 22	Seattle	United States	Climate Pledge Arena	14,046 / 14,046	$1,818,540
February 25	Sacramento	United States	Golden 1 Center	13,466 / 13,466	$1,918,545
February 27	San Francisco	United States	Chase Center	13,395 / 13,395	$2,239,008
March 1	Phoenix	United States	Mortgage Matchup Center	12,078 / 12,078	$1,907,059
March 4	Houston	United States	Toyota Center	11,226 / 11,226	$1,839,634
March 6	Austin	United States	Moody Center	11,404 / 11,404	$2,005,740
March 7	Dallas	United States	American Airlines Center	13,636 / 13,636	$2,550,243
March 9	Denver	United States	Ball Arena	12,900 / 12,900	$1,976,865
March 12	Minneapolis	United States	Target Center	13,368 / 13,368	$1,641,058
March 14	Indianapolis	United States	Gainbridge Fieldhouse	13,150 / 13,150	$1,964,686
March 15	Detroit	United States	Little Caesars Arena	14,106 / 14,106	$2,360,033
March 17	Kansas City	United States	T-Mobile Center	13,667 /13,667	$1,894,020
March 19	Cincinnati	United States	Heritage Bank Center	12,598 / 12,598	$1,778,542
March 21	Chicago	United States	United Center	14,372 / 14,372	$2,469,585
March 25	New York City	United States	Madison Square Garden	26,211 / 26,211	$5,325,491
March 26	New York City	United States	Madison Square Garden	26,211 / 26,211	$5,325,491
March 28	Newark	United States	Prudential Center	12,609 / 12,609	$2,308,762
March 30	Toronto	Canada	Scotiabank Arena	15,052 / 15,052	$1,833,767
March 31	Hamilton	Canada	TD Coliseum	11,706 / 11,706	$963,838
April 2	Boston	United States	TD Garden	13,043 / 13,043	$2,114,596
April 3	Hartford	United States	PeoplesBank Arena	10,723 / 10,723	$1,572,099
April 4	Baltimore	United States	CFG Bank Arena	11,743 / 11,743	$2,041,833
April 7	Philadelphia	United States	Xfinity Mobile Arena	14,383 / 14,383	$2,295,689
April 8	Washington, D.C.	United States	Capital One Arena	13,603 / 13,603	$2,228,447
April 11	Raleigh	United States	Lenovo Center	13,426 / 13,426	$2,272,333
April 12	Charlotte	United States	Spectrum Center	14,404 / 14,404	$2,088,523
April 14	Sunrise	United States	Amerant Bank Arena	13,233 / 13,233	$1,879,800
April 17	Atlanta	United States	State Farm Arena	22,898 / 22,898	$4,891,129
April 18	Atlanta	United States	State Farm Arena	22,898 / 22,898	$4,891,129
Total				453,043 (100%)	$70,034,469
