= Ah Ha (song) =

2026 single by Cardi B

Single by Cardi B
- Released: July 31, 2026
- Length: 2:56
- Label: Atlantic
- Lyricists: Belcalis Almánzar; James D. Steed; Jordan Thorpe; Mathew "Sean island" Allen
- Producer: DJ SwanQo

Cardi B singles chronology
"ErrTime" (2025)	"Ah Ha" (2026)	"Don't Chart" (2026)

Music video
- "Ah Ha" on YouTube

"Ah Ha" is a song by American rapper Cardi B. It was released through Atlantic Records on July 31, 2026, as her first solo single of the year. Produced by DJ SwanQo, it marked her first solo release following her second studio album, Am I the Drama? (2025).

== Background ==
Following the release of her second studio album, Am I the Drama?, in September 2025, the release of its fourth single, "ErrTime", on November 18, 2025, marked Cardi B's final solo release for the following nine months. In October 2025, she stated that she planned to release another project within less than a year. On July 27, 2026, Cardi B shared the first preview of the song on social media, accompanied by a video of her walking along a beach in the Dominican Republic while wearing a bikini. In an Instagram Live video the following day, Cardi B provided further context on the song's lyrics and their meaning. On July 29, Cardi B announced the song on social media and unveiled its cover artwork photographed by Zac Schuss, inviting fans to "meet [her] at the club". Producer DJ SwanQo had previously collaborated with Cardi B on the single "Up" (2021), which became her fifth number-one single on the Billboard Hot 100.

== Composition ==
Reviewing the song, Pitchfork described "Ah Ha" as a "classic Cardi cut", highlighting its braggadocious lyrics about wealth, "laughing at haters", and the humiliation of former lovers. "Ah Ha" is built around a "hard-hitting" club production with "catchy" and "revved up" lyrics, while also featuring lyrics directed at Donald Trump. In an "unapologetic statement", the song showcases Cardi B's "signature energy of sexy and fun", with lyrics that mock her detractors and emphasize that she is "still on top".

== Charts ==
Chart performance for "Ah Ha"
Chart (2026)	Peak position
Costa Rica Anglo Airplay (Monitor Latino)	11
Global 200 (Billboard)	95
New Zealand Hot Singles (RMNZ)	9
Nicaragua Anglo Airplay (Monitor Latino)	5
Nigeria (TurnTable Top 100)	85
UK Singles Sales (Official Charts)	42
US Billboard Hot 100	25
US Hot R&B/Hip-Hop Songs (Billboard)	5
US R&B/Hip-Hop Airplay (Billboard)	9
US Rhythmic Airplay (Billboard)	1
