= Enough Said (disambiguation) =

Enough Said is a 2013 film with Julia Louis-Dreyfus and James Gandolfini.

Enough Said may also refer to:

- Enough Said (film score)
- Enough Said!, a 1959 album by Bill Jennings, and its title track
- "Enough Said" (song), a 2012 song by Aaliyah, released posthumously
- "Enough Said", a song by Devo from New Traditionalists
- "Enough Said" (George Canyon song)
- "Enough Said" (Sepultura song)

== See also ==
- Nuff Said (disambiguation)
- Enough (disambiguation)
