= Enough =

Enough may refer to:

== Film and television ==
- Enough (film), a 2002 American thriller directed by Michael Apted
- Enough! Lebanon's Darkest Hour, a 2021 Australian documentary film
- "Enough" (CSI: NY), a 2008 TV episode
- "Enough" (Not Going Out), a 2017 TV episode
- "Enough" (Tru Calling), a 2005 TV episode

== Music ==
=== Albums ===
- Enough, by Tricia Brock, 2013

=== Songs ===
- "Enough" (Delta Goodrem song), 2016
- "Enough" (Malina Moye song), 2019
- "Enough (Miami)", by Cardi B, 2024
- "Enough", by Ateez from Golden Hour: Part.2, 2024
- "Enough", by BarlowGirl from Another Journal Entry, 2005
- "Enough", by Branan Murphy, 2017
- "Enough", by Cat Power from Myra Lee, 1996
- "Enough", by charlieonnafriday, 2022
- "Enough", by Chris Tomlin from Not to Us, 2002
- "Enough", by Default from Elocation, 2003
- "Enough", by Disturbed from Indestructible, 2008
- "Enough", by Fantasia from Sketchbook, 2019
- "Enough", by Flume from Skin Companion EP 2, 2017
- "Enough", by Got7 from Present: You, 2018
- "Enough", by Grandson from I Love You, I'm Trying, 2023
- "Enough", by Gravity Kills from Gravity Kills, 1996
- "Enough", by Jeremy Camp from Carried Me, 2004
- "Enough", by Jess Glynne from Jess, 2024
- "Enough", by Jessica Sierra, 2010
- "Enough", by Keke Wyatt from Unbelievable, 2011
- "Enough", by Kelela from Take Me Apart, 2017
- "Enough", by Lil Mosey, 2021
- "Enough", by Mary J. Blige from Good Morning Gorgeous, 2022
- "Enough", by Sara Groves from Floodplain, 2015
- "Enough", by Sevendust from Chapter VII: Hope & Sorrow, 2008
- "Enough", by Simply Red from A New Flame, 1989
- "Enough", by Tarja Turunen from My Winter Storm, 2007
- "Enough", by Todrick Hall from Haus Party, Pt. 3, 2021
- "Enough", by Tweet from Simply Tweet, 2013
- "Enough", from the musical In the Heights, 2005

== Politics ==
- Enough Project, a U.S.-based human rights organization
- Enough! National School Walkout, a 2018 United States gun violence protest
- Chega (English: "Enough"), a Portuguese political party
- Stačilo! (English: "Enough!"), a Czech political coalition

== Other uses ==
- Enough (book), a 2023 memoir by Cassidy Hutchinson
- Enough, Missouri, U.S., a ghost town

== See also ==
- Enuff (disambiguation)
