= Get Up 10 =

2018 song by Cardi B

Song by Cardi B

from the album Invasion of Privacy
- Genre: Hip hop
- Length: 3:51
- Label: Atlantic
- Songwriters: Belcalis Almanzar; James Swanqo; Sean Allen; Jordan Thorpe; Anthony Tucker; Robert Williams; Maurice Jordan; Jermaine Preyan
- Producers: The Beat Bully; DJ SwanQo; Allen

"Get Up 10" is a song recorded by American rapper Cardi B for her debut studio album Invasion of Privacy (2018). The opening number on the album, it was written by Cardi B and Pardison Fontaine, and its producers The Beat Bully, DJ SwanQo and Sean Allen. The song contains interpretations from "Dreams and Nightmares", written by Meek Mill, Maurice Jordan and Jermaine Preyan, therefore they are credited among the composers. It debuted at number 38 on the US Billboard Hot 100 the week following the album's release.

== Composition and lyrics ==
In the lyrics, Cardi B chronicles her rise to prominence, from working at a strip club in New York to her breakthrough in the music industry. For a Vibe editor, it takes influence from Meek Mill's "Dreams and Nightmares" in the "gradual lead in, slowly leading up to a sick bass drop and rapid fire flow about taking over the rap industry."

== Critical reception ==
Jem Aswad of Variety called the song an "empowering opening autobiographical testimonial," and noted it also made room for "clever, piercingly funny lyrics." Andreas Hale in Billboard said, "from the haunting piano opening to the aggressive manner that the song builds momentum, this is the way you welcome listeners to your world and show them that you mean business." Eleanor Halls of GQ considered it the best song on the album. For Kathy Iandoli of XXL, in the "dynamic" intro "Cardi barks with ferocity [...] she leaves the listener with only the ability to focus on her music—gossip blog clickbait to the side."

== Live performances ==
Cardi B gave the first televised performance of the song at the 2018 BET Hip Hop Awards in a medley that also included "Backin' It Up", where she was joined by Pardison Fontaine.

== Charts ==
Chart (2018)	Peak position
Canada Hot 100 (Billboard)	67
US Billboard Hot 100	38
US Hot R&B/Hip-Hop Songs (Billboard)	23

== Certifications ==
Region	Certification	Certified units/sales
Canada (Music Canada)	Gold	40,000^{‡}
United States (RIAA)	Platinum	1,000,000^{‡}
^{‡} Sales+streaming figures based on certification alone.
