= Pretty & Petty =

Song by Cardi B

from the album Am I the Drama?
- Released: September 19, 2025
- Genre: West Coast hip-hop
- Length: 2:40
- Label: Atlantic
- Songwriters: Belcalis Almánzar; Jordan Thorpe; James Steed; Matthew Allen
- Producers: DJ SwanQo; Sean Island

Audio video
- "Pretty & Petty" on YouTube

"Pretty & Petty" is a song by American rapper Cardi B. Released on September 19, 2025, through Atlantic Records, it is the thirteenth track on Cardi B's second studio album, Am I the Drama? (2025). A diss track aimed at American rapper Bia, it was written by Cardi B, Pardison Fontaine, and its producers DJ SwanQo and Sean Island.

== Background ==
The feud between rappers Cardi B and Bia originated when the former released the song "Like What (Freestyle)" in 2024, which samples Missy Elliott's hit "She's a Bitch". Bia had sampled the same record in her own song titled "I'm That Bitch" with Timbaland in 2023. As a result, fans on Twitter began comparing the works and claiming Cardi imitated Bia, to which Bia responded seemingly agreeing. The feud escalated when Bia allegedly referenced Cardi on the remix of Dreezy's "Bitch Duh" in April 2024 by mocking her rap skills and for crying on live. Cardi responded a month later on the remix of GloRilla and Megan Thee Stallion's "Wanna Be", playing off of Bia's name in the line "Nobody wanna be ya (Bia)," and accusing her of deleting tweets.

Immediately following the release of the "Wanna Be" remix, Bia took to Twitter to shade Cardi with a play on lyrics from her and her then-husband Offset's song "Clout" and posted a video of a rap battle in which a rapper uses a line that falls flat with the crowd. In June 2024, Bia previewed a diss record in which she accuses Cardi B of cheating on Offset. She also references Cardi's children, Kulture and Wave, rapping "Thought your ass was for the culture, you just tryin' to ride the wave / You should be home with your kids 'cause bitch, you speak like second grade." Hours later, Cardi B went on Instagram Live to address the situation, explaining that she recorded "Like What (Freestyle)" years earlier and threatening to file a lawsuit against Bia for spreading false rumors. In response, Bia officially released her full diss track titled "Sue Meee?", with cover art that featured a deleted June 2023 Instagram Story from Offset in which he alleged that Cardi B cheated on him.

== Music and lyrics ==
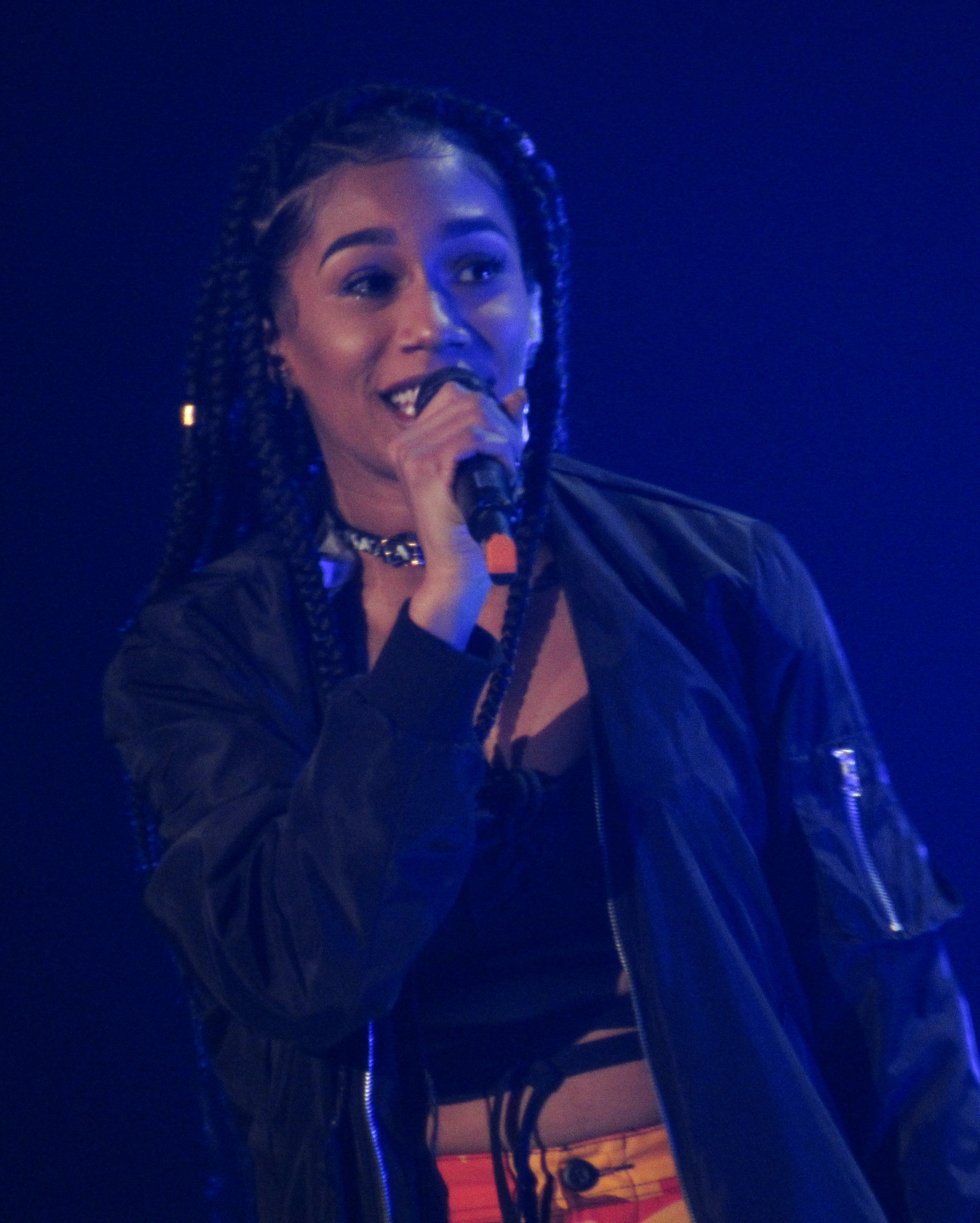
In "Pretty & Petty", Cardi B insults Bia's success, rap flow, and looks, among numerous other disses.

"Pretty & Petty" is a diss track aimed at Bia in response to her song "Sue Meee?", and features Cardi B unloading a series of disses at her rival over a West Coast-inspired beat. In an interview with The Breakfast Club, Cardi expressed that she chose to respond because she took exception to Bia mentioning her children: "You mentioned my kids tryna be cute ... When my kids grow up one day and they see that you mentioned them, they're gonna ask me, 'So what you said, what you did?' I'm not gonna tell my kids, I'm not going to tell my kids I took the high road ... I'm like, 'You see how I violated?'"

At the start of the track, Cardi B declares herself "pretty" and "petty as fuck" before setting her target on Bia. In a direct challenge to Bia's recognition in rap culture, Cardi begins the first verse with the line "Name five Bia songs, gun pointed to your head / Bow, I'm dead," mocking her rival's relatively unknown catalog. She then criticizes Bia's "melatonin flow" for its lack of energy and claims Bia's label Epic Records is overspending on the artist, quipping "I'm doing you a favor, Epic, run me my bread." Cardi goes after Bia's looks, saying she'd "rather die on the surgery table" than "walk around here lookin' like you." She then taunts Bia for not having a single BET Award as a winner of 21 herself.

In the second verse, Cardi B continues to mock Bia and calls her a "fake ghetto bitch". She raises allegations of questionable affiliations and asks "Why you always at Diddy house? ... Tell these folks what it's really about." Cardi piles on a series of disses, naming her "Diarrhea Bia" and saying promoters only book her when "they can't afford Coi", referring to fellow rapper Coi Leray. To add insult to injury, Cardi mocks Bia's looks by rapping "I'm a bad bitch and you mad/ 'Cause you built like your dad". She criticizes Bia's light-skinned privilege in the line "I hate when a bitch think she cute 'cause she light skin" and nods to the film Mean Girls in the closing moments of the track by calling her "a Gretchen," a side character to Cardi's "icon" and "legend". She ends by wondering if Bia is "dumb" for wanting a feud with her and warns her rival, "Told you, don't you ever mention my kids, bitch."

== Critical reception ==
"Pretty & Petty" received generally positive reception from critics, who praised it as an excellent diss track as well as one of the best songs on Am I the Drama?. Billboard staff ranked it as the third-best track on the album, praising its "laid-back, breezy feel" while "Cardi's volatile delivery ensures the diss lands with full impact", even while she enjoys a "good time along the way." Writing for Vibe, Armon Sandler ranked it the fifth-best song on the album and called it "great not just for the digs but also the overall song elements."

== Impact ==
According to Google Trends data, searches for Bia spiked dramatically in the United States immediately following the release of "Pretty & Petty". Bia would later reference the track a week later in an Instagram post promoting her upcoming album Bianca, with the caption "I got 16 more songs u can name".

== Credits and personnel ==
Credits were adapted from Tidal.

Musicians

- Cardi B – vocals, songwriter
- James "DJ SwanQo" Steed – producer, songwriter
- Matthew "Sean Island" Allen – producer, songwriter
- Jordan Thorpe – songwriter
- Darrale Jones – executive producer
- Jonathan "Brooklyn Johnny" Descartes – executive producer

Technical

- Evan LaRay – recording engineer
- Leslie Brathwaite – mixing engineer
- Colin Leonard – mastering engineer

== Charts ==
Chart performance for "Pretty & Petty"
Chart (2025)	Peak position
Global 200 (Billboard)	198
New Zealand Hot Singles (RMNZ)	15
US Billboard Hot 100	43
US Hot R&B/Hip-Hop Songs (Billboard)	10
