= American Music Award for Favorite Rap/Hip Hop Song =

American music award

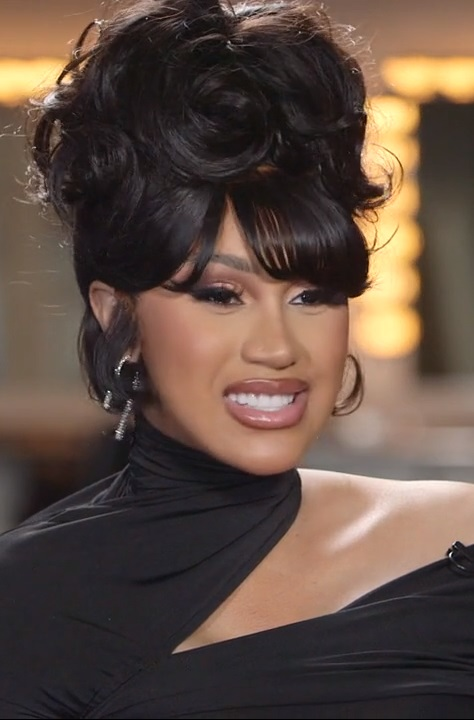
- "ErrTime" by Cardi B is the most recent recipient
- Country: United States
- Presented by: American Music Awards
- First award: 2016
- Currently held by: Cardi B – "ErrTime"

Highlights
- Most wins: Cardi B (4)
- Most nominations: Kendrick Lamar (4)
- Website: theamas.com

The American Music Award for Favorite Song – Rap/Hip Hop has been awarded since 2016. Three songs are nominated per year. Cardi B became the first artist to win the award twice. She has won four times.

== Winners and nominees ==
=== 2010s ===
Year	Artist	Song	Ref
2016 (44th)
2016 (44th)	Drake	"Hotline Bling"	
2016 (44th)	Desiigner	"Panda"	
2016 (44th)	Fetty Wap	"679"	
2017 (45th)
2017 (45th)	DJ Khaled (featuring Justin Bieber, Quavo, Chance the Rapper and Lil Wayne)	"I'm the One"	
2017 (45th)	Kendrick Lamar	"Humble."	
2017 (45th)	Rae Sremmurd (featuring Gucci Mane)	"Black Beatles"	
2018 (46th)
2018 (46th)	Cardi B	"Bodak Yellow"	
2018 (46th)	Drake	"God's Plan"	
2018 (46th)	Post Malone (featuring 21 Savage)	"Rockstar"	
2019 (47th)
2019 (47th)	Lil Nas X (featuring Billy Ray Cyrus)	"Old Town Road"	
2019 (47th)	Travis Scott	"Sicko Mode"	
2019 (47th)	Post Malone	"Wow"	

=== 2020s ===
Year	Artist	Song	Ref
2020 (48th)
2020 (48th)	Cardi B (featuring Megan Thee Stallion)	"WAP"	
2020 (48th)	DaBaby (featuring Roddy Ricch)	"Rockstar"	
2020 (48th)	Roddy Ricch	"The Box"	
2021 (49th)
2021 (49th)	Cardi B	"Up"	
2021 (49th)	Internet Money (featuring Gunna, Don Toliver and Nav)	"Lemonade"	
2021 (49th)	Lil Tjay (featuring 6lack)	"Calling My Phone"	
2021 (49th)	Polo G	"Rapstar"	
2021 (49th)	Pop Smoke	"What You Know Bout Love"	
2022 (50th)
2022 (50th)	Future (featuring Drake and Tems)	"Wait for U"	
2022 (50th)	Jack Harlow	"First Class"	
2022 (50th)	Kodak Black	"Super Gremlin"	
2022 (50th)	Latto	"Big Energy"	
2022 (50th)	Lil Nas X (featuring Jack Harlow)	"Industry Baby"	
2025 (51st)
2025 (51st)	Kendrick Lamar	"Not Like Us"	
2025 (51st)	Future, Metro Boomin and Kendrick Lamar	"Like That"	
2025 (51st)	GloRilla	"TGIF"	
2025 (51st)	GloRilla (featuring Sexyy Red)	"Whatchu Kno About Me"	
2025 (51st)	Kendrick Lamar and SZA	"Luther"	
2026 (52nd)
2026 (52nd)	Cardi B	"ErrTime"	
2026 (52nd)	Drake	"Nokia"	
2026 (52nd)	Gunna (featuring Burna Boy)	"WGFT"	
2026 (52nd)	Playboi Carti and The Weeknd	"Rather Lie"	
2026 (52nd)	Metro Boomin, Breskii, Quavo and YK Niece	"Take Me Thru Dere"	

== Category facts ==
=== Multiple wins ===
4 wins

- Cardi B

=== Multiple nominations ===
4 nominations

- Kendrick Lamar

3 nominations

- Cardi B
- Drake

2 nominations

- Future
- GloRilla
- Jack Harlow
- Lil Nas X
- Post Malone
- Roddy Ricch
