= Outside (Cardi B song) =

2025 single by Cardi B

Single by Cardi B

from the album Am I the Drama?
- Released: June 20, 2025
- Recorded: 2024
- Genre: Hip-hop
- Length: 3:26
- Label: Atlantic
- Songwriters: Belcalis Almanzar; Ernest Brown III; James Steed; Jorden Thorpe; Orville Hall; Phillip Price; Roosevelt Jean; Yakki Davis; Micaela Moore
- Producers: Charlie Heat; HeyMicki; DJ SwanQo

Cardi B singles chronology
"Toot It Up" (2025)	"Outside" (2025)	"Imaginary Playerz" (2025)

Lyric video
- "Outside" on YouTube

"Outside" is a song by American rapper Cardi B. It was released on June 20, 2025, through Atlantic Records as the lead single from her second studio album, Am I the Drama? (2025). Her first solo single since "Enough (Miami)" in 2024, it is a hip-hop song written by Cardi B and various collaborators and produced by Charlie Heat, HeyMicki, and DJ SwanQo.

"Outside" debuted at number 10 on the US Billboard Hot 100, becoming Cardi B's thirteenth top-ten hit and the first song by a female rapper to debut in the top ten since "Enough (Miami)" in 2024. It also marked the third top-ten single on Am I the Drama?, after "WAP" and "Up". The song peaked at number one on the Rhythmic Airplay and Rap Airplay charts, her ninth and eighth chart-topper on each respectively. "Outside" received a nomination for the Grammy Award for Best Rap Performance at the 68th Annual Grammy Awards, extending Cardi B's record as the female rapper with the most nominations in that category.

== Background ==
In early June, a leaked snippet of an unreleased track by Cardi B went viral in which she disses an unnamed man, speculated to be her estranged husband Offset. In response to the track's virality, the rapper shared that she did not plan on releasing it as a single and wished to release her long-awaited second studio album all together instead, and was filming a music video "in a couple of weeks" for another song. She later expressed that her label wanted her to release the song due to the positive reaction and that she "might drop it."

On June 17, Cardi B announced the single named "Outside" would release in three days and posted its cover art depicting the aftermath of a summer block party in New York City, including an overflowing fire hydrant and dominoes, open lipstick, blunt wrappers, and red Solo cups spread across the sidewalk. The song was officially released on June 20, 2025, marking her first solo single of the year and her first since "Enough (Miami)" in 2024. "Outside" appeared on the rapper's second studio album Am I the Drama? (2025).

== Music and lyrics ==
According to Cardi B, she made the song "a few months ago when I was very, very angry. I had to change some bars because I was angry, honey," adding that she wouldn't have released it without the fan demand. Over a sample of the classic Triggerman beat, Cardi B declares that she is ready to be back outside. She seemingly takes aim at Offset, insulting him as "Good-for-nothing, low-down dirty dogs, I'm convinced / Next time you see your mama, tell her how she raised a bitch." She also hints at her new relationship with football player Stefon Diggs, saying "Favorite player from your favorite team, he in my DM, uh / I'm so small and tiny, he so big and tall / Might let him dunk this pussy like he dunk the ball."

== Release ==
"Outside" was released on digital streaming platforms on June 20, 2025. Cardi B debuted the song live two days prior at a Spotify event in Cannes, France. It was sent to urban and rhythmic radio on June 23. An a cappella version of "Outside" was released digitally on June 26.

== Critical reception ==
Billboard ranked "Outside" as the twelfth-best song on Am I the Drama?, praising the track's "fiery confidence and razor-sharp wit" and calling it the "right appetizer" for the album.

== Commercial performance ==
In the United States, "Outside" debuted at number ten on the Billboard Hot 100 chart, marking Cardi B's thirteenth top-ten hit. The song earned 15.6 million streams, 6 million in airplay audience and 14,000 sold in its debut week, and became her eighth number-one hit on the Digital Song Sales chart. It marked the first song by a female rapper to debut in the top ten of the Billboard Hot 100 since her last solo single "Enough (Miami)" in 2024. "Outside" reached number one on the Rhythmic Airplay chart on the August 16 dated ranking, becoming her ninth number-one on the chart and her first since "Up" in 2021. It also reached number one on the Rap Airplay chart in the same week, becoming her eighth number-one on the chart and her first since "Tomorrow 2" with GloRilla in 2022. With this, Cardi B became the woman with the second-most number ones on Rap Airplay, only one behind Nicki Minaj, and the artist with the sixth-most number-ones overall after Drake, Lil Wayne, Ye, Jay-Z, and Minaj.

== Accolades ==
Awards and nominations for "Outside"
Organization	Year	Category	Result	Ref.
Grammy Awards	2026	Best Rap Performance	Nominated	
iHeartRadio Music Awards	2026	Hip-Hop Song of the Year	Nominated	
BET Awards	2026	Viewer's Choice Award	Nominated	

== Credits and personnel ==
Credits were adapted from Tidal.

Musicians

- Cardi B – vocals, songwriter
- Ernest "Charlie Heat" Brown III – producer, songwriter
- Micaela "HeyMicki" Moore – producer, songwriter
- James "DJ SwanQo" Steed – co-producer, songwriter
- Jorden Thorpe – songwriter
- Orville Hall – songwriter
- Phillip Price – songwriter
- Roosevelt Jean – songwriter
- Yakki Davis – songwriter

Technicals

- Evan LaRay – recording engineer, mixing engineer
- Leslie Brathwaite – mixing engineer
- Colin Leonard – mastering engineer

== Charts ==
=== Weekly charts ===
Weekly chart performance for "Outside"
Chart (2025)	Peak position
Canada Hot 100 (Billboard)	61
Germany Urban (Deutsche Urban Charts)	3
Global 200 (Billboard)	27
Lithuania (AGATA)	2
New Zealand Hot Singles (RMNZ)	12
South Africa Streaming (TOSAC)	21
Suriname (Nationale Top 40)	6
UK Singles (Official Charts)	72
UK Hip Hop/R&B (Official Charts)	15
US Billboard Hot 100	10
US Hot R&B/Hip-Hop Songs (Billboard)	2
US R&B/Hip-Hop Airplay (Billboard)	6
US Rhythmic Airplay (Billboard)	1

=== Year-end charts ===
Year-end chart performance for "Outside"
Chart (2025)	Position
US Hot R&B/Hip-Hop Songs (Billboard)	31
US R&B/Hip-Hop Airplay (Billboard)	20
US Rhythmic Airplay (Billboard)	29

== Certifications ==
Certifications for "Outside"
Region	Certification	Certified units/sales
Canada (Music Canada)	Gold	40,000^{‡}
^{‡} Sales+streaming figures based on certification alone.

== Release history ==
Release dates and formats for "Outside"
Region	Date	Format	Version	Label	Ref.
Various	June 20, 2025	Digital download; streaming	Original; instrumental	Atlantic	
United States	June 23, 2025	Urban contemporary; rhythmic contemporary radio	Original	Atlantic	
Various	June 26, 2025	Digital download; streaming	Acapella	Atlantic	
