= Nice Guy (Cardi B song) =

Song by Cardi B featuring Tyla

from the album Am I the Drama?
- Released: September 19, 2025
- Length: 3:16
- Label: Atlantic
- Songwriters: Belcalis Almanzar; Tyla Seethal; London Holmes; Hailey Rusch; Jordan Thorpe; Almando Cresso; Javier Mercado; Kevin Andre Price; Steven Giron
- Producers: London on da Track; Synthetic; Venny

Audio video
- "Nice Guy" on YouTube

"Nice Guy" is a song by American rapper Cardi B featuring South African singer Tyla. Released on September 19, 2025, through Atlantic Records, it is the twentieth track on Cardi B's second studio album, Am I the Drama? The song was produced by London on da Track, Synthetic and Venny, with Go Grizzly contributing additional production. It was written by Cardi B, Tyla, Hailey Rusch, Jordan Thorpe, Almando Cresso, Javier Mercado, Kevin Andre Price, and its producers.

It received generally positive reception from critics and outlets praising it as a standout cut on the album. "Nice Guy" peaked at number 8 on the US Bubbling Under Hot 100 and number 38 on the Official South African Charts.

== Critical reception ==
"Nice Guy" received generally positive reception from critics and outlets praising it as a standout on the album. Billboard staff ranked it as the number one track on the album, noting that it "should've been a lead single" due to its hit potential and ability to dominate radio during the summer. They highlighted Tyla's smooth vocals, her surprising rap and Cardi's fiery cadence and ad-libs, calling the collaboration a "big win" that bridges global sounds.

== Credits and personnel ==
Credits were adapted from Tidal.

Musicians

- Cardi B – vocals, songwriter
- Tyla – vocals, songwriter
- Darrale Jones – executive producer
- Jonathan "Brooklyn Johnny" Descartes – executive producer
- London on da Track – producer, songwriter
- Sythetic – producer, songwriter
- Venny – producer, songwriter
- Go Grizzly – additional producer, songwriter
- Almando Cresso – songwriter
- Hailey Rusch – songwriter
- Jordan Thorpe – songwriter

Technical

- Evan LaRay – recording engineer
- Colin Leonard – mastering engineer
- Leslie Brathwaite – mixing engineer

== Charts ==
Chart performance for "Nice Guy"
Chart (2025)	Peak position
South Africa Streaming (TOSAC)	40
US Bubbling Under Hot 100 (Billboard)	8
US Hot R&B/Hip-Hop Songs (Billboard)	38
