= List of Billboard Digital Song Sales number ones of 2024 =

2024 highest-selling digital singles in the United States

The Billboard Digital Song Sales chart is a chart that ranks the most downloaded songs in the United States. Its data is compiled by Nielsen SoundScan based on each song's weekly digital sales, which combines sales of different versions of a song by an act for a summarized figure.

== Chart history ==
Key
†	Indicates best-selling song of 2024

Issue date	Song	Artist(s)	Weekly sales	Ref(s)
January 6	"Closer Than This"	Jimin	14,000	
January 13	"Lovin on Me"	Jack Harlow	8,000	
January 20	"FTCU"	Nicki Minaj	—N/a	
January 27	"Yes, And?"	Ariana Grande	41,000	
February 3	"Lose Control"	Teddy Swims	7,000	
February 10	"Hiss"	Megan Thee Stallion	104,000	
February 17	"Fast Car"	Tracy Chapman	35,000	
February 24	"Texas Hold 'Em"	Beyoncé	39,000	
March 2	"Texas Hold 'Em"	Beyoncé	29,000	
March 9	"Beautiful Things"	Benson Boone	25,000	
March 16	"Lose Control"	Teddy Swims	26,000	
March 23	"Lose Control"	Teddy Swims	12,000	
March 30	"Enough (Miami)"	Cardi B	37,000	
April 6	"Beautiful Things"	Benson Boone	10,000	
April 13	"Texas Hold 'Em"	Beyoncé	15,000	
April 20	"Wanna Be"	GloRilla and Megan Thee Stallion	16,000	
April 27	"A Bar Song (Tipsy)" †	Shaboozey	10,000	
May 4	"Fortnight"	Taylor Swift featuring Post Malone	19,000	
May 11	"A Bar Song (Tipsy)" †	Shaboozey	21,000	
May 18	"A Bar Song (Tipsy)" †	Shaboozey	—N/a	
May 25	"I Had Some Help"	Post Malone featuring Morgan Wallen	69,000	
June 1	"I Had Some Help"	Post Malone featuring Morgan Wallen	21,000	
June 8	"A Bar Song (Tipsy)" †	Shaboozey	20,000	
June 15	"Houdini"	Eminem	49,000	
June 22	"A Bar Song (Tipsy)" †	Shaboozey	—N/a	
June 29	"A Bar Song (Tipsy)" †	Shaboozey	20,000	
July 6	"A Bar Song (Tipsy)" †	Shaboozey	22,000	
July 13	"A Bar Song (Tipsy)" †	Shaboozey	23,000	
July 20	"A Bar Song (Tipsy)" †	Shaboozey	21,000	
July 27	"You Missed"	Tom MacDonald	—N/a	
August 3	"Who"	Jimin	53,000	
August 10	"Who"	Jimin	49,000	
August 17	"A Bar Song (Tipsy)" †	Shaboozey	12,000	
August 24	"A Bar Song (Tipsy)" †	Shaboozey	12,000	
August 31	"Die with a Smile"	Lady Gaga and Bruno Mars	18,000	
September 7	"A Bar Song (Tipsy)" †	Shaboozey	11,000	
September 14	"A Bar Song (Tipsy)" †	Shaboozey	10,000	
September 21	"Neva Play"	Megan Thee Stallion and RM	—N/a	
September 28	"Dancing in the Flames"	The Weeknd	14,000	
October 5	"Fighter"	Jon Kahn	—N/a	
October 12	"I'm Gonna Love You"	Cody Johnson and Carrie Underwood	—N/a	
October 19	"Darkest Hour (Helene Edit)"	Eric Church	—N/a	
October 26	"A Bar Song (Tipsy)" †	Shaboozey	—N/a	
November 2	"Love Somebody"	Morgan Wallen	17,000	
November 9	"Die with a Smile"	Lady Gaga and Bruno Mars	16,000	
November 16	"Goodbye Joe"	Tom MacDonald and Nova Rockafeller	12,000	
November 23	"Hard Fought Hallelujah"	Brandon Lake	13,000	
November 30	"Running Wild"	Jin	22,000	
December 7	"A Bar Song (Tipsy)" †	Shaboozey	9,000	
December 14	"Winter Ahead"	V with Park Hyo-shin	—N/a	
December 21	"White Christmas"	V and Bing Crosby	—N/a	
December 28	"All I Want for Christmas Is You"	Mariah Carey	—N/a	
