= Magnet (Cardi B song) =

2025 song by Cardi B

Song by Cardi B

from the album Am I the Drama?
- Released: September 19, 2025
- Genre: Hip-hop
- Length: 2:58
- Label: Atlantic
- Songwriters: Belcalis Almánzar; Jorden Thorpe; Julius Rivera III; Lloyd McKenzie; Morris Jones; Maurice Washington; James Steed; Darryl Clemons; Kevin Price; Timothy McKibbins
- Producers: DJ SwanQo; Pooh Beatz; Go Grizzly; B100

"Magnet" is a song by American rapper Cardi B, released on September 19, 2025, from her second studio album Am I the Drama? (2025). It was produced by DJ SwanQo, Pooh Beatz, Go Grizzly and B100. The song is a diss track primarily aimed at rapper JT and escalated a feud between the two rappers.

== Content ==
The song finds Cardi B rapping about attracting the finer things in life and her success as a top celebrity, It opens with a voice calling her "the real trap Selena", followed by the chorus, in which she boasts about her beauty and compares herself to singer Toni Braxton in regard to her short hair. Throughout the song, Cardi takes shots at several rappers. In the first verse, she responds to Ice Spice's diss on her song "BB Belt" with an assertion of her dominance in the hip-hop industry. She also shouts out to women who wear pantsuits like former U.S. Vice President Kamala Harris and juxtaposes them against her estranged husband Offset, saying they "got my baby daddy actin' like my baby mama". In the second verse, Cardi targets JT and her partner Lil Uzi Vert. She lambasts JT as an ungrateful, fake friend who kicked her when she was down, and compares her to the titular character of 2Pac's song "Brenda's Got a Baby". Cardi recalls a line from JT's song "Intro (Hope)" that referred to a viral video that people perceived as Cardi using a bottle as a sex toy. She also criticizes Lil Uzi Vert for their sexual relationship with JT and the couple sharing bags, saying she never shared accessories with Offset even though he was unfaithful. Toward the end, Cardi references JT spending time with fashion designer Rick Owens earlier in the year.

== Critical reception ==
Billboard ranked "Magnet" as the 17th best song from Am I the Drama?, with Angel Diaz believing it would likely become popular on social media. Sam Franzini of The Line of Best Fit described the song as "structurally solid but shallow". Mary Chiney of Beats Per Minute wrote that the song "doubles down with club-ready aggression, a sweaty, high-octane workout jam that flexes Cardi's voice as weapon and shield." Zachary Horvath of HotNewHipHop considered it "one of the best and biggest bangers regardless of the headline-worthy bars."

== Response ==
Following the song's release, Cardi B and JT continued to take shots at each other on social media, starting when JT responded to the song with a series of angry tweets and Snapchat stories. JT replied to a post about the song's ten credited writers with a message calling the song "weak" and mocking that Cardi would eventually "need Jesus to help write".

== Credits and personnel ==
Credits were adapted from Tidal.

Musicians

- Cardi B – vocals, songwriter
- James "DJ SwanQo" Steed – producer, songwriter
- Darryl "Pooh Beatz" Clemons – producer, songwriter
- Kevin "Go Grizzly" Price – producer, songwriter
- Timothy "B100" McKibbins – producer, songwriter
- Jordan Thorpe – songwriter
- Julius Rivera III – songwriter
- Lloyd McKenzie – songwriter
- Morris Jones – songwriter
- Maurice Washington – songwriter
- Darrale Jones – executive producer
- Jonathan "Brooklyn Johnny" Descartes – executive producer

Technical

- Evan LaRay – recording engineer
- Colin Leonard – mastering engineer
- Leslie Brathwaite – mixing engineer

== Charts ==
Chart performance for "Magnet"
Chart (2025)	Peak position
Jamaica Airplay (JAMMS)	7
Global 200 (Billboard)	170
US Billboard Hot 100	37
US Hot R&B/Hip-Hop Songs (Billboard)	8
