= Safe (Cardi B song) =

2025 single by Cardi B

Single by Cardi B featuring Kehlani

from the album Am I the Drama?
- Released: September 19, 2025
- Genre: Brooklyn drill; R&B
- Length: 2:57
- Label: Atlantic
- Songwriters: Belcalis Almánzar; Kehlani Parrish; Jordan Thorpe; James Steed; Matthew Allen
- Producers: DJ SwanQo; Sean Island

Cardi B singles chronology
"Imaginary Playerz" (2025)	"Safe" (2025)	"ErrTime" (2025)

Kehlani singles chronology
"Sugar Sweet" (2025)	"Safe" (2025)	"Out the Window" (2025)

Music video
- "Safe" on YouTube

"Safe" is a song by American rapper Cardi B featuring American singer Kehlani. It was released on September 19, 2025, through Atlantic Records as the third single from Cardi B's second studio album, Am I the Drama? (2025). The song was written by the artists with Jordan Thorpe and its producers James "DJ SwanQo" Steed and Matthew "Sean Island" Allen.

== Background and release ==
On June 22, 2025, Cardi B announced her second studio album Am I the Drama? (2025), due for release on September 19. The album's first two singles "Outside" and "Imaginary Playerz" were released on June 20 and August 15 respectively. On September 15, she shared the album's list of features, including singer Kehlani. The collaboration's name was revealed to be "Safe" in the album tracklist reveal on September 18.

The day of the album's release, Cardi B confirmed that a music video for "Safe" would accompany the album's release at midnight ET. The song was released to Italian radio the same day, as well as US rhythmic radio on September 23.

== Critical reception ==
Billboard ranked "Safe" as the second-best song on the album, stating that the song had potential to be a radio hit and to be used on social media for Valentine's Day.

== Accolades ==
Awards and nominations for "Safe"
Organization	Year	Category	Result	Ref.
MTV Video Music Awards	2026	Best Hip Hop	Won	
NAACP Image Awards	2026	Outstanding Duo, Group or Collaboration (Contemporary)	Nominated	
Grammy Awards	2027	Best Melodic Rap Performance	Pending	

== Music video ==
An official music video to accompany the song was directed by Arrad and released on September 19, 2025. American actor Don Benjamin appears in the video as Cardi B’s love interest. In the video, Cardi and Benjamin are depicted starting a family together. However, his secret activities strain their relationship, resulting in Cardi B's increasing sense of isolation during her pregnancy. After a climactic argument, Benjamin leaves the house but returns to find his lover murdered.

== Credits and personnel ==
Credits were adapted from Tidal.

Musicians

- Cardi B – vocals, songwriter
- Kehlani – vocals, songwriter
- Darrale Jones – executive producer
- Jonathan "Brooklyn Johnny" Descartes – executive producer
- James "DJ SwanQo" Steed – producer, songwriter
- Matthew "Sean Island" Allen – producer, songwriter
- Jordan Thorpe – songwriter

Technical

- Evan LaRay – recording engineer
- Colin Leonard – mastering engineer
- Leslie Brathwaite – mixing engineer

== Charts ==
Chart performance for "Safe"
Chart (2025–2026)	Peak position
Australia Hip Hop/R&B (ARIA)	28
Canada Hot 100 (Billboard)	93
Germany Urban (Deutsche Urban Charts)	1
Global 200 (Billboard)	76
Jamaica Airplay (JAMMS)	5
New Zealand Hot Singles (RMNZ)	5
Nigeria (TurnTable Top 100)	71
South Africa Streaming (TOSAC)	51
UK Singles (Official Charts)	98
US Billboard Hot 100	26
US Hot R&B/Hip-Hop Songs (Billboard)	3
US R&B/Hip-Hop Airplay (Billboard)	6
US Rhythmic Airplay (Billboard)	1

== Release history ==
Release dates and formats for "Safe"
Region	Date	Format	Label	Ref.
Italy	September 19, 2025	Radio airplay	Warner Music Italy	
United States	September 23, 2025	Rhythmic contemporary radio	Atlantic	
