= Imaginary Playerz =

2025 single by Cardi B

Single by Cardi B

from the album Am I the Drama?
- Released: August 15, 2025
- Genre: Hip-hop
- Length: 3:27
- Label: Atlantic
- Songwriters: Belcalis Almánzar; Angela Winbush; Daven Vanderpool; James Steed; Jordan Thorpe; Matthew Allen; René Moore; Saleem Allen; Shawn Carter
- Producers: DJ SwanQo; OctaneThisThatGas; Sean Island

Cardi B singles chronology
"Outside" (2025)	"Imaginary Playerz" (2025)	"Safe" (2025)

Music video
- "Imaginary Playerz" on YouTube

"Imaginary Playerz" is a song by American rapper Cardi B. It was released on August 15, 2025, through Atlantic Records as the second single from her second studio album, Am I the Drama? (2025). The song was written by Cardi B, Pardison Fontaine, and its producers James "DJ SwanQo" Steed, Saleem "OctaneThisThatGas" Allen, and Matthew "Sean Island" Allen, and samples Jay-Z's 1997 track "Imaginary Player". The song peaked at number 66 on the US Billboard Hot 100, following the release of Am I the Drama?.

== Background ==
On June 22, 2025, Cardi B announced her second studio album Am I the Drama? (2025), due for release on September 19. The album's lead single "Outside" was released on June 20, debuting within the top ten of the Billboard Hot 100. On August 11, Cardi B revealed her follow-up single "Imaginary Playerz" would be released on August 15, describing it as "Just a lil taste of the drama." The announcement was accompanied by the single's cover art of herself with pink hair and a white fur coat in front of a white Rolls Royce. The rapper confirmed an accompanying music video with a teaser clip the day before its release.

== Music and lyrics ==
"Imaginary Playerz" samples Jay-Z's 1997 track "Imaginary Players" from his second studio album In My Lifetime, Vol. 1. Prior to the song's release, she shared with fans on Twitter Spaces that "the one and only", referring to Jay-Z, personally approved her use of "Imaginary Players" and admitted that if he had not approved of the song, she would have reflected "'OK, maybe I just had to come a little bit harder.' But I'm glad that I came hard and he loved it." She also shared on Instagram Live that she "fought really hard to put this song out" with those who wanted a different direction while she wanted to go for a hip-hop sound, describing it as "real calm flex shit", and that "When [Jay-Z] text back, my manager, the record was clear, it was at 4:44 pm," taking the time as a sign with respect to the rapper's latest solo studio album 4:44 (2017).

== Critical reception ==
Billboard ranked "Imaginary Playerz" as the fourteenth-best song on the album. They argued that the song should have stayed a B-side instead of being released as a single, which raised expectations for the track. However, they felt that the song made sense with the album's themes and would grow on listeners in context of the full album.

== Music video ==
The official music video was directed by Cardi B and Patientce Foster and released alongside the single. In the video, Cardi B turns a New York airport tarmac into a fashion show runway with a red ballroom gown. After taking a private jet to Mykonos, Greece, she is then shown spending a day on a yacht. The rapper enjoys a lobster dinner on the beach and then returns to her five-star resort for a foot bath with champagne. In the final scene, she models couture looks before heading out for a night in Paris.

== Credits and personnel ==
Credits were adapted from Tidal.

Musicians

- Cardi B – vocals, songwriter
- James "DJ SwanQo" Steed – producer, songwriter
- Matthew "Sean Island" Allen – producer, songwriter
- Saleem "OctaneThisThatGas" Allen – producer, songwriter
- Angela Winbush – songwriter
- Daven Vanderpool – songwriter
- Jordan Thorpe – songwriter
- René Moore – songwriter
- Shawn Carter – songwriter

Technical

- Evan LaRay – recording engineer, mixing engineer
- Leslie Brathwaite – mixing engineer
- Colin Leonard – mastering engineer

== Charts ==
Chart performance for "Imaginary Playerz"
Chart (2025)	Peak position
Germany Urban (DUC)	2
New Zealand Hot Singles (RMNZ)	30
US Billboard Hot 100	66
US Hot R&B/Hip-Hop Songs (Billboard)	14
US R&B/Hip-Hop Airplay (Billboard)	37
US Rhythmic Airplay (Billboard)	36

== Release history ==
Release dates and formats for "Imaginary Playerz"
Region	Date	Format	Label	Ref.
Various	August 15, 2025	Digital download; streaming	Atlantic	
