= Lourdiz =

American singer-songwriter (born 2001)

- Born: Alyssa Lourdiz Cantu; April 18, 2001 (age 25)
- Origin: San Antonio, Texas, U.S.
- Genres: Pop
- Occupations: Singer; songwriter
- Label: Prescription Songs

Alyssa Lourdiz Cantu (born April 18, 2001) is an American singer and songwriter.

== Life and career ==
Alyssa Lourdiz Cantu was born raised in San Antonio. She cites the city's Tejano culture as a heavy influence on her music. She resides in Los Angeles.

While still a teenager, Lourdiz wrote songs for artists including Swae Lee, Anitta, and G-Eazy. She signed with Dr. Luke's publishing company Prescription Songs in 2018.

Lourdiz launched her career as a performer with the release of her debut single, "I'm Pissed", in 2020. In 2021, she was selected for the inaugural class of the "First on SoundCloud" artist incubator program.

== Discography ==
=== As lead artist ===
List of singles as lead artist
Title	Year	Album
"Suicide Down" (featuring Lil Gotit)	2020	Non-album singles
"Ground Control" (featuring Jon Z)	2020	Non-album singles
"Somersault"	2020	Non-album singles
"Za Za"	2020	Non-album singles
"Circles"	2021	Non-album singles
"Shoot Me Down"	2021	Non-album singles
"Get Along" (featuring Shenseea)	2021	Non-album singles
"All My Bitches"	2023	Non-album singles
"Heartbreakers"	2023	Non-album singles
"Trust Issues"	2024	Non-album singles
"Cute"	2024	Non-album singles

=== As featured artist ===
List of singles as featured artist, with selected chart positions and certifications
Title	Year	Album
"Me Time" (Carneyval featuring Lourdiz)	2022	Non-album single

=== Other charted songs ===
Title	Year	Peak chart positions		Album
Title	Year	US Bub.	US R&B/HH	Album
"On My Back" (Cardi B featuring Lourdiz)	2025	1	31	Am I the Drama?

=== As guest artist ===
List of non-single guest appearances, showing year released and album name
Title	Other artist(s)	Year	Album
"Little By Little"	Tritonal	2019	U & Me
"Love U Right"	Tritonal	2019	U & Me
"Back Seat"	Saweetie	2021	Pretty Summer Playlist: Season 1
"Cowgirl"	Nicki Minaj	2023	Pink Friday 2

=== As songwriter ===
List of songwriting credits, showing year released, artist, fellow co-writers and album name
Title	Year	Artist(s)	Co-written with	Album
"Poquito"	2019	Anitta featuring Swae Lee	Khalif Malik Ibn Shaman Brown, Michael Matosic, Ryan Ogren	Kisses
"Pantera"	2019	Anitta	Elof Fred Karl Loelv, Larissa de Macedo Machado, Mauricio Rengifo, Umberto Da Silva Tavares, Andres Torres	Charlie's Angels: Original Motion Picture Soundtrack
"Hate the Way"	2020	G-Eazy featuring Blackbear	Michael Lewis Crook, Gerald Gillum, Matthew Tyler Musto, Ryan Ogren, Benjamin Shubert	These Things Happen Too (deluxe edition)
"The Best"	2022	Erica Banks	Erica Banks, Brandon Hamlin, Randall Hammers, Ryan Ogren, Asia Smith	Diary of the Flow Queen
"Freaky Deaky"	2022	Tyga and Doja Cat	Michael Louis Crook, Amala Ratna Dlamini, Lukasz Gottwald, Ryan Ogren, Brandon Hamlin, Michael Stevenson, Suzanne Vega	Non-album singles
"Sunshine"	2022	Tyga featuring Jhené Aiko and Pop Smoke	Samuel Edward Chinedu Ahana, Jhené Aiko Efuro Chilombo, Michael Crook, Alexander Edwards, Carlos Omar Hassan, Bashar Barakah Jackson, Sandy Lal, Asher Reed Saperstein, Michael Stevenson, Wesley Eric Weston, Armen Zabounian	Non-album singles
"Anxiety"	2022	Coi Leray	Lil Aaron, Coi Leray Collins, Lukasz Gottwald, Rocco Valdes	Trendsetter
"Bite Me"	2023	ENHYPEN	Jason Evigan, Henry Russel Walter, Hyuk Shin, David Alexander Stewart	Dark Blood
