= Nuff Said =

Nuff Said may refer to:

- 'Nuff Said! (Nina Simone album), 1968
- 'Nuff Said (Ike & Tina Turner album), 1971
- Nuff Said (2023), a National Wrestling Alliance pay-per-view event

== See also ==
- Nuf Ced, a nickname of Michael T. McGreevy
- "Nuf Said", a song by Lil Tjay from his 2021 album Destined 2 Win
