= Backin' It Up =

Single by Pardison Fontaine featuring Cardi B

from the album UNDER8ED
- Released: September 20, 2018
- Genre: Hip hop
- Length: 3:10
- Label: Atlantic
- Songwriters: Jordan Thorpe; Belcalis Almanzar; Joshua Louis Huizar; Joshua Scruggs; Stuart Lowery; Rashawnna Guy; Todd Shaw; Stuart Jordan; Ramone Gooden; Bryant Bell
- Producers: J-Louis; Syk Sense; Epikh Pro

Pardison Fontaine singles chronology
"Food Stamps" (2018)	"Backin' It Up" (2018)	"Madden Flow" (2019)

Cardi B singles chronology
"Ring" (2018)	"Backin' It Up" (2018)	"Taki Taki" (2018)

Music video
- "Backin' It Up" on YouTube

"Backin' It Up" is a hip hop song by American rapper Pardison Fontaine, featuring vocals from fellow American rapper Cardi B. It was released along with its music video on September 20, 2018, by Atlantic Records. The song was written by the two artists, along its producers, J-Louis, Syk Sense, and Epikh Pro. It contains an interpolation of "Gettin' Some", with Shawnna, Too Short, Shorty B and Pee-Wee of The Dangerous Crew, and Xcel being credited as co-writers. It was certified platinum by the Recording Industry Association of America (RIAA).

== Background ==
Fontaine and Cardi B are long-time collaborators, having worked together on several songs. "Backin' It Up" was previewed at a 2018 MTV Video Music Awards afterparty that Cardi attended. It is the first song released from Fontaine's major label debut EP.

== Music video ==
Directed by Kid Art, the song's music video shows Fontaine, Cardi B and their crew performing in illuminated floors and parking garages, wearing luxurious fabrics and jewels. In the clip, Fontaine enters a pizzeria and proceeds to flirt with a girl. Cardi first appears in a Lil' Kim-inspired all-red outfit.

== Live performances ==
Pardison Fontaine and Cardi B gave the first televised performance of the song at the 2018 BET Hip Hop Awards. Fontaine joined Cardi on stage following her performance of "Get Up 10".

== Charts ==
=== Weekly charts ===
Chart (2018–19)	Peak position
New Zealand Hot Singles (RMNZ)	36
US Billboard Hot 100	40
US Hot R&B/Hip-Hop Songs (Billboard)	18
US Rhythmic Airplay (Billboard)	11

=== Year-end charts ===
Chart (2019)	Position
US Hot R&B/Hip-Hop Songs (Billboard)	59
US Rhythmic (Billboard)	47

== Certifications ==
Region	Certification	Certified units/sales
New Zealand (RMNZ)	Platinum	30,000^{‡}
United States (RIAA)	Platinum	1,000,000^{‡}
^{‡} Sales+streaming figures based on certification alone.

== Release history ==
Region	Date	Format	Label	Ref.
Various	September 20, 2018	Digital download	Atlantic	
United States	November 6, 2018	Rhythmic contemporary radio	Atlantic	
