= Like What (Freestyle) =

2024 promotional single by Cardi B

Promotional single by Cardi B
- A-side: "Enough (Miami)"
- Released: March 1, 2024
- Recorded: January 2023
- Genre: Hip hop
- Length: 2:16
- Label: Atlantic
- Songwriter: Belcalis Almánzar
- Producers: DJ SwanQo; Sean Island; OctaneThisThatGas; Lateef the Truthspeaker

Music video
- "Like What (Freestyle)" on YouTube

"Like What (Freestyle)" is a song by American rapper Cardi B, released on March 1, 2024, through Atlantic Records with an accompanying music video. The song was included on a digital reissue of her second studio album Am I the Drama? (2025). It is a freestyle of "She's a Bitch" by Missy Elliott.

== Composition ==
Over the instrumental of "She's a Bitch", Cardi B targets her detractors and enemies and reminds them of her status in the rap music industry.

== Critical reception ==
Zachary Horvath of HotNewHipHop wrote of the song, "Lyrically, Cardi is delivering some solid rhymes and lines". Alex Gonzalez of Uproxx commented that Cardi B "arrives with the same eccentric and charismatic energy Missy did 25 years ago" and "She delivers some of the most scorching bars of her career, as she reminds us all how quickly she can switch it up."

== Music video ==
The official music video was directed by Offset. Set in a hillside, glass-covered mansion, it begins with Cardi B strutting around the halls in an outfit that pays homage to Lil' Kim in her video for "Came Back for You": a black bikini under a floor-length fur coat, in addition to a jeweled choker with matching earrings and crystal-encrusted eyebrows (a tribute to Missy Elliott). In one scene, she is shown with pink eyelashes and in another she lounges on a red sofa by a pool as she eats sushi out of a Yves Saint Laurent bag. Cardi B later wears a diamond-encrusted bikini and chaps, posing for a photo shoot. The visual ends with a message reading, "This is just the beginning...stay tuned".

== Charts ==
Chart performance for "Like What (Freestyle)"
Chart (2024)	Peak position
Canada Hot 100 (Billboard)	88
Global 200 (Billboard)	91
New Zealand Hot Singles (RMNZ)	8
Nigeria (TurnTable Top 100)	58
US Billboard Hot 100	38
US Hot R&B/Hip-Hop Songs (Billboard)	12
