= Pick It Up (Cardi B song) =

Song by Cardi B featuring Selena Gomez

from the album Am I the Drama?
- Released: September 19, 2025
- Genre: R&B
- Length: 2:40
- Label: Atlantic
- Songwriters: Belcalis Almánzar; Hadar Adora; Jordan Thorpe; Lewis Shoates; Philip Constable; Roosevelt Jean
- Producer: DJ Hardwerk

Audio video
- "Pick It Up" on YouTube

"Pick It Up" is a song by American rapper Cardi B featuring American singer Selena Gomez. Released on September 19, 2025, through Atlantic Records, it is the fourth track on Cardi B's second studio album, Am I the Drama? (2025). It was written by Cardi B, Hadar Adora, Jordan Thorpe, Lewis Shoates, Roosevelt Jean, and its producer Philip "DJ Hardwerk" Constable.

== Background ==
Cardi B first collaborated with Selena Gomez on the 2018 hit single "Taki Taki", which they performed together at the 2019 Coachella Valley Music and Arts Festival. On September 15, 2025, the rapper shared the list of features on her second studio album Am I the Drama?, which included Gomez. Their collaboration was revealed to be titled "Pick It Up" in the album tracklist reveal on September 18. In a CBS Mornings interview, Cardi B expressed that she chose to work again with Gomez for "Pick It Up" because "she sounded really lovely for this song" and called her a "delight to work with". The rapper added that despite being "a whole billionaire", Gomez always provided her support and "if you call her for something, she’s not going to hesitate".

== Music and lyrics ==
"Pick It Up" has been described as a "sensual" track with themes of "longing, desire, and love that doesn’t fade". In the song, Cardi B and Selena Gomez beg a prospective lover to return to where they left off and come back for more. With its "catchy melodies, some whimsical tones, and an airy atmosphere", the song is a tranquil change of pace on the album. An R&B-leaning pop track, the beat combines rap drum patterns and pop-like synths to create a hybrid that fits both artists.

Gomez opens the love song with a confession that "I'm so obsessed, you got me checkin’ my phone / Every second like, I hope you ask if I’m home." She gets more impatient as she waits for any signal that the relationship isn't done. Cardi B then shows off her singing skills by sharing the chorus with Gomez. They sing the hook "Pick it up where we left off / can't give it up, I've been missin' ya", exploring the tension of being stuck on an irresistible yet stagnant connection. Cardi then raps a confident, sharp-tongued verse, though her punchlines eventually soften as she admits her lover has an incomparable hold on her, saying "And I still ain't find nobody who do it like you."

== Critical reception ==
"Pick It Up" received generally positive reception from critics, who named it one of the best tracks on Am I the Drama?. Writing for Vibe, Armon Sandler ranked it the second-best song on the album, saying it has "radio hit, playlist monster, and TikTok virality written all over it." Robin Murray of Clash called it an "immediate highlight" for its "vibrancy" and the "dazzling light of their vocals honing in on femme effervescence." Billboard staff ranked it as the fifth-best track on the album, praising Cardi B's versatility. They questioned why it wasn't one of the lead singles and hoped for a music video as it "feels like it should be playing on TRL and 106 & Park after school."

== Credits and personnel ==
Credits were adapted from Tidal.

Musicians

- Cardi B – vocals, songwriter
- Selena Gomez – featured vocals
- Philip "DJ Hardwerk" Constable – producer, songwriter
- Hadar Adora – songwriter, background vocals
- Jordan Thorpe – songwriter
- Lewis Shoates – songwriter
- Roosevelt Jean – songwriter
- Darrale Jones – executive producer
- Jonathan "Brooklyn Johnny" Descartes – executive producer

Technical

- Evan LaRay – recording engineer
- Colin Leonard – mastering engineer
- Leslie Brathwaite – mixing engineer

== Charts ==
Chart performance for "Pick It Up"
Chart (2025)	Peak position
Global 200 (Billboard)	157
New Zealand Hot Singles (RMNZ)	17
US Billboard Hot 100	45
