= Am I the Drama? =

2025 studio album by Cardi B

Studio album by Cardi B
- Released: September 19, 2025
- Recorded: September 2019 – February 2025
- Genre: Hip-hop
- Length: 70:49
- Label: Atlantic
- Producers: Argel; Ayo & Keyz; B100; B HAM; Charlie Heat; Daan; Dizzy Banko; DJ Hardwerk; DJ SwanQo; Don; FnZ; Go Grizzly; HeyMicki; Hide; Shae Jacobs; Jeff Kleinman; Lateef; London on da Track; Kham McPherson; Octane; Omar Grand; Pardison Fontaine; Ponzoo; Pooh Beats; Ric & Thadeus; Sean Island; Sensai; Smash David; Synthetic; TM88; Too Dope; Triangle Park; Venny; Vinylz; Yung Dza

Cardi B chronology
Invasion of Privacy (2018)	Am I the Drama? (2025)

Singles from Am I the Drama?
- 1. "Outside" Released: June 20, 2025; 2. "Imaginary Playerz" Released: August 15, 2025; 3. "Safe" Released: September 19, 2025; 4. "ErrTime" Released: November 18, 2025

Am I the Drama? is the second studio album by American rapper Cardi B. It was released on September 19, 2025, through Atlantic Records. It serves as the follow-up to her debut album, Invasion of Privacy (2018). The album, a hip-hop record, includes features from Summer Walker, Selena Gomez, Kehlani, Dougie F, Lizzo, Cash Cobain, Lourdiz, Janet Jackson, Tyla, and Megan Thee Stallion. The album's production was handled by Ayo the Producer, Keyz, Charlie Heat, FnZ, London on da Track, TM88, and Vinylz, among others.

Am I the Drama? debuted at number one on the US Billboard 200, making Cardi B the only female rapper to have her first two albums debut atop the chart. It earned 200,000 album-equivalent units in its first week, and was later certified triple platinum by the Recording Industry Association of America (RIAA). It has sold over 4.6 million units in the United States as of February 2026. Elsewhere, the album reached the top ten in Australia and Canada.

The album was supported by the singles "Outside", "Imaginary Playerz", "Safe" (featuring Kehlani), and "ErrTime", with "Outside" debuting in the top ten of the US Billboard Hot 100. The album also included the number-one singles "WAP" and "Up", in turn this tied with Invasion of Privacy as the female rap album with the most Hot 100 number-ones (two each). "WAP" is the only female rap collaboration to debut atop the Hot 100 and had a large cultural impact.

Upon release, Am I the Drama? received generally positive reviews from critics, who deemed it a strong return to form, highlighting Cardi B's lyrical delivery, rap flow, and honesty throughout the album. The album won the award for Outstanding Album at the 57th NAACP Image Awards, and for Best Hip-Hop Album at the 52nd American Music Awards. To support the album, Cardi B embarked on the Little Miss Drama Tour (2026).

== Background and development ==
Following the release of her debut album Invasion of Privacy (2018), Cardi B released several stand-alone singles, and ventured into other forms of entertainment, including television and fashion. Apart from single releases, the rapper occasionally previewed snippets of other tracks on her social media. During this period, Cardi B achieved two number one singles on the US Billboard Hot 100 – "WAP" (2020) (featuring Megan Thee Stallion), and "Up" (2021). The rapper revealed that her second studio album would shortly follow; however, the project was delayed multiple times, citing perfectionism and pressure to live up to expectations.

Arriving over seven years after its predecessor, Am I the Drama? was recorded over a six-year period and features collaborations with artists she has worked with before as well as new collaborators. The inclusion of "WAP" and "Up" on the album's track list initially drew some criticism, with accusations that including the songs was a ploy to boost streaming numbers. Cardi B later clarified in a tweet in June 2025 that the songs were among her biggest hits and "deserve a home," as they were released during the album's creative process.

Cardi B was inspired to name the album Am I the Drama? after the amount of "real-life drama" she had been experiencing. She also drew inspiration from a meme in the online Drag Race community, specifically a quote from Scarlet Envy said during "Meet the Queens" segment of RuPaul's Drag Race All Stars.

== Release and promotion ==
After teasing an impending announcement on June 22, 2025, Cardi B officially revealed the album artwork and the release date for Am I the Drama? the next day via her social media. On June 27, Scarlet Envy brought Cardi B onstage on the LadyLand Festival, where the rapper performed "Outside". On June 30, a video trailer for the album was released, which sees a CGI flock of aggressive black birds attack Cardi B, who tries to get inside a car to escape. Jonah Krueger of Consequence and Atreyo Palit of Screen Rant wrote that the video and cover art's aesthetic were reminiscent of The Birds (1963) by Alfred Hitchcock; Krueger made an additional comparison to Home Alone 2 (1992) by Chris Columbus. In July, Cardi B attended the Schiaparelli fashion show in Paris, where she brought a live black bird on her arm. Multiple news outlets named the bird as a raven, crow, or rook.

Cardi B rolled out a series of alternative vinyl and CD covers for Am I the Drama?, which are themed around tracks on the album, including "Imaginary Playerz", "Pretty & Petty", and "Magnet", respectively. In August, she appeared in court after a former security guard sued the rapper for assault originating from an incident in 2018. Cardi B's testimony at the trial went viral for her unfiltered, charismatic persona, resulting in numerous clips and memes shared across social media. After she was found not liable, Cardi B announced on September 3 that she would release special CD versions of her album titled "The Courtroom Edition", featuring photos of her viral moments from the trial on the cover.

Cardi B held a pop-up event on September 13 titled "Bodega Baddie" at a bodega in Washington Heights, New York City. On September 15, she announced the list of featured artists on the album, consisting of Summer Walker, Selena Gomez, Kehlani, Lizzo, Cash Cobain, Tyla, Janet Jackson and Megan Thee Stallion. Cardi B shared the album's tracklist on September 18, revealing an additional feature from Lourdiz. From September 19 to 25, Cardi B embarked on a meet-and-greet tour across the United States, visiting six stops.

=== Singles and videos ===
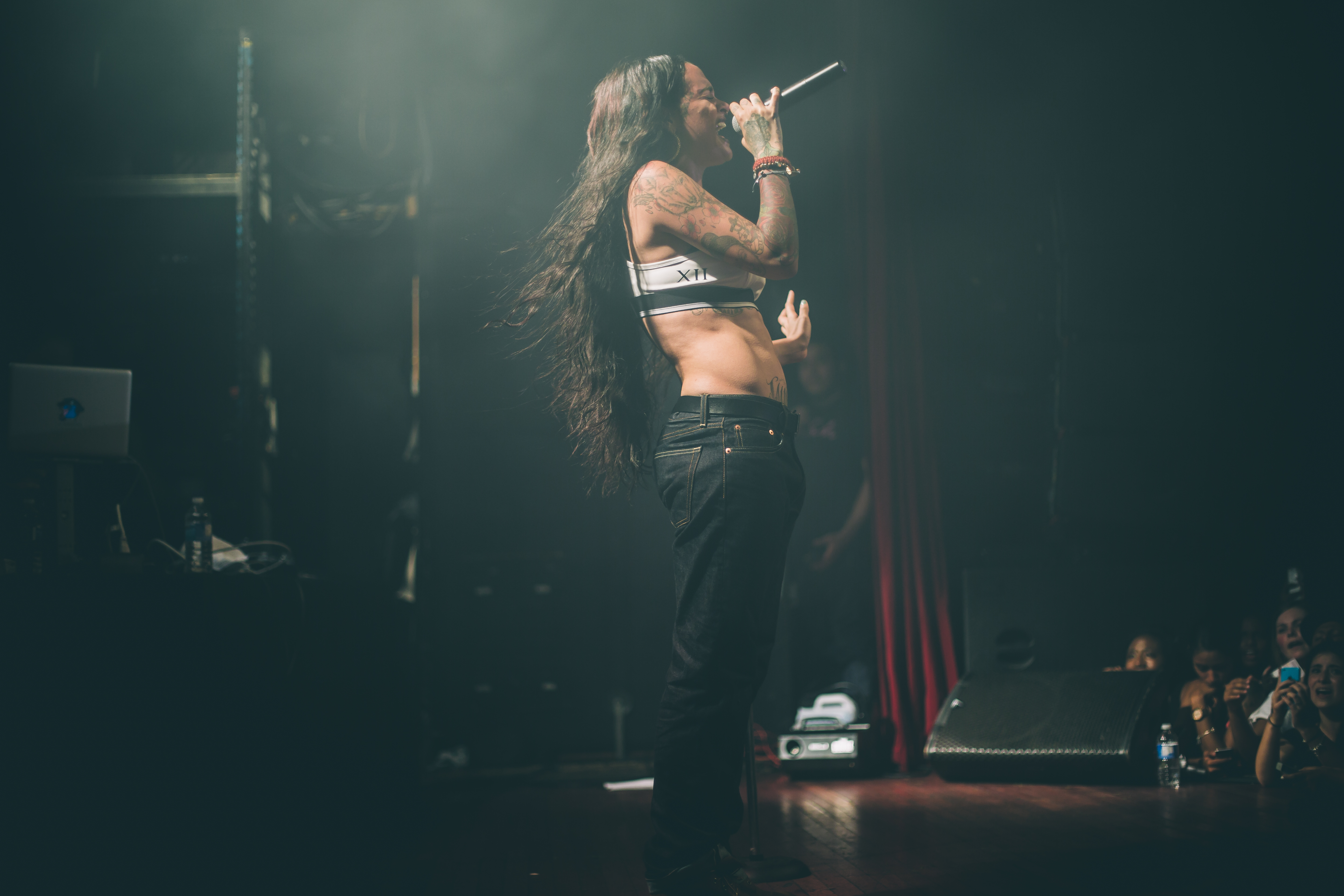
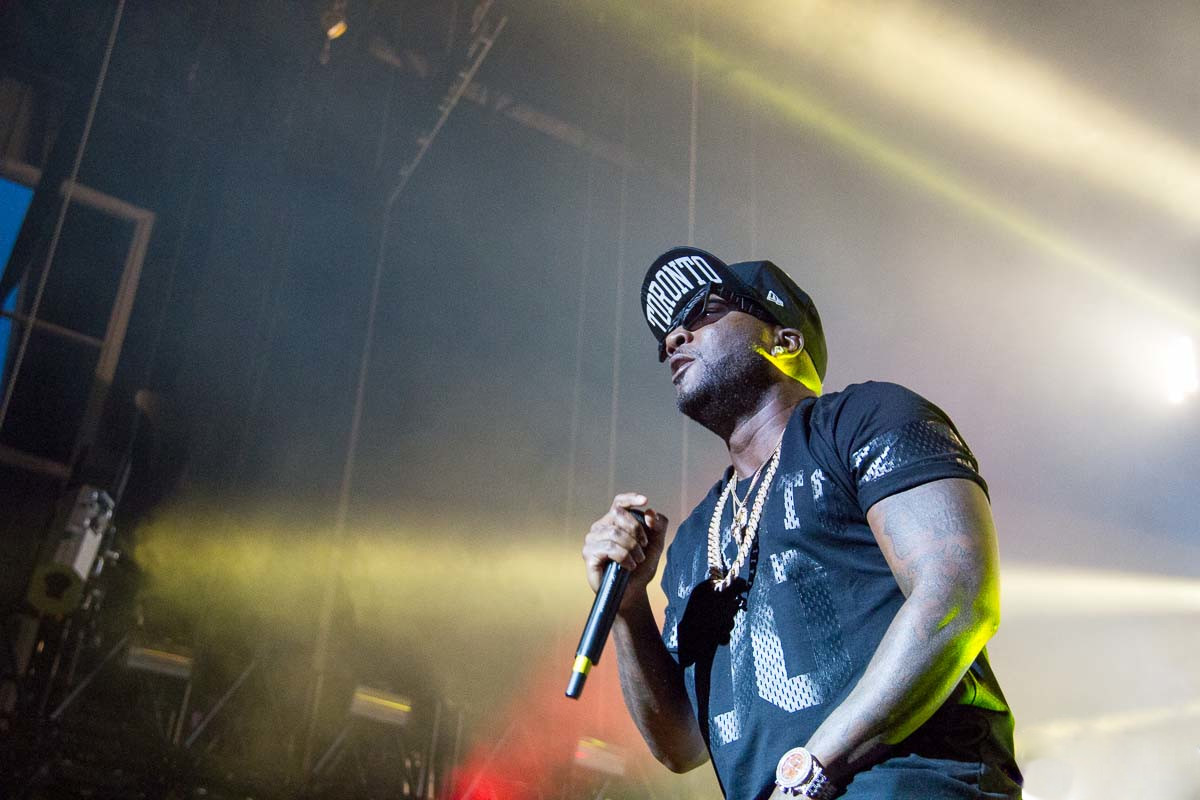
Kehlani (top) and Jeezy (bottom) feature on the singles "Safe" and "ErrTime", respectively.

The lead single from Am I the Drama?, "Outside", was released on June 20, 2025. The track reached number ten on the US Billboard Hot 100, becoming Cardi B's thirteenth top ten entry on the chart. It marked the first song by a female rapper to debut in the top ten since her 2024 single "Enough (Miami)". Additionally, the track reached number 72 on the UK Singles Chart, and number 27 on the Billboard Global 200. "Outside" was nominated for Best Rap Performance at the 68th Annual Grammy Awards, and Hip-Hop Song of the Year at the iHeartRadio Music Awards 2026.

The album's second single "Imaginary Playerz" was released on August 15, alongside its music video directed by Patientce Foster. The track samples Jay-Z's song "Imaginary Players" (1997). "Imaginary Playerz" peaked at number 66 on the Billboard Hot 100, and number 14 on the Billboard Hot R&B/Hip-Hop Songs chart.

The album's third single, "Safe" featuring Kehlani, was released alongside the album on September 19. Directed by Arrad Rahgoshay, the song's music video was released the same day and features actor Don Benjamin. "Safe" peaked at number 26 on the Billboard Hot 100, and number three on the Billboard Hot R&B/Hip-Hop Songs chart. Additionally, it reached number 98 on the UK Singles Chart, and number 76 on the Billboard Global 200.

Following the release of the "Ultimate" version of the album on November 12, the remix of "ErrTime" featuring Jeezy was serviced to rhythmic contemporary radio on November 18 as the album's fourth single. The remix reached number one on the US Rhythmic Airplay chart, becoming the second number one single from the album on the chart following "Outside", while the standard version of the track reached number 43 on the US Billboard Hot 100. The standard version of "ErrTime" was nominated for Best Hip-Hop Song at the American Music Awards 2026.

=== Tour ===
To promote the album, Cardi B embarked on the Little Miss Drama Tour (2026). It consisted of 35 shows in North America and commenced on February 11, 2026, in Palm Desert, concluding on April 18 in Atlanta. The tour received positive reviews from critics, and was attended by over 450,000 people, grossing $70 million.

== Critical reception ==
Professional ratings
Aggregate scores
Source	Rating
AnyDecentMusic?	6.7/10
Metacritic	74/100
Review scores
Source	Rating
AllMusic	3.5/5 stars
Clash	7/10
Consequence	B
The Guardian	4/5 stars
The Line of Best Fit	6/10
MusicOMH	3.5/5 stars
NME	2/5 stars
Pitchfork	6.6/10
Rolling Stone	4.5/5 stars
Slant Magazine	3.5/5 stars

Am I the Drama? received generally positive reviews from music critics upon release. According to the review aggregator Metacritic, Am I the Drama? received "generally favorable reviews" based on a weighted average score of 74 out of 100 from 13 critic scores. The review aggregator site AnyDecentMusic? compiled ten reviews and gave the album an average of 6.7 out of 10, based on their assessment of the critical consensus.

Rob Sheffield of Rolling Stone described Am I the Drama? as a "massive comeback triumph" and a "fittingly grand return for a queen who never left the throne." Writing for The Guardian, Alexis Petridis complimented the album's "sharp, impressively witty lyrics" which he described as being "delivered with brutal vigour". He described the album's material as "raw and powerful", while mentioning rapper Young Thug shifting the release date of his upcoming album, noting that "[Am I the Drama? is] not an album that a rival would want to go up against". Steven J. Horowitz of Variety referred to Am I the Drama? as a "unflinching, raw and refined" album that "never loses its footing", and praised tracks concerning her divorce such as "Shower Tears" and "Magnet" for giving the album "much-needed heft". He noted the addition of the previously released tracks "WAP" and "Up", describing them as "[slotting] comfortably with the rest of the record", and concluded that the album "shrugs off the threat of a sophomore slump".

Writing for Clash, Robin Murray commented how Am I the Drama? is an album that "at first curiously struggles to find its footing" before an "assured mid-section guides Cardi B to the next level of her career". He noted the tracks "Pick It Up" with Selena Gomez and "Bodega Baddie" as being highlights from the album, with the "dazzling light of their vocals honing in on femme effervescence" on the former, while describing the latter as "one of the record's most confident solo expressions" and "the sound of an icon reclaiming their own identity". Kiana Fitzgerald of Consequence noted the tracks addressing "other women MCs", such as the track "Magnet" which she describes as a "pointed attack" at fellow rapper JT that "shatters [JT's] image", along with the track "Pretty & Petty" "[re-escalating] her beef" with Boston rapper Bia. She described the singles "Outside" and "Imaginary Playerz" as "[sounding] like leftovers within the context of the album", concluding that Am I the Drama? is "no Invasion of Privacy", but "Cardi B is closer to fighting form than she's been in years".

In more mixed reviews, Sam Franzini of The Line of Best Fit described Cardi as not "making it any easier on herself" by releasing a new record "during a year that is several removed from when she was a topic of cultural conversation", but that "the field isn't as stacked this year" with "rap dominated headlines", which should be "an open path to victory". However, he concluded that few of Am I the Drama?'s songs "seem poised to stick around", describing the album's tracks as "fine at best and miserable at worst". He offered praise to the previously released "WAP" and "Up", describing the former as "doing a lot of heavy lifting" and the latter as not "[loosing] any of its star power from 2021". Franzini highlighted the new track "Trophies" as a standout, describing it as "[providing] some intensity", while noting that the tracks "Magnet" and "Pretty & Petty" are "structurally solid but shallow". Writing for The Times, Will Hodgkinson described Am I the Drama? as "a record that would have been seriously good at half the length". Similarly, Kyann-Sian Williams of NME described the album as "bloated" and "unsure of its own identity". Mary Chiney of Beats Per Minute noted that "even the weaker cuts" on the album "carry flashes of energy", and suggested that the album's perceived excessive length could tie in with Cardi's public persona, which she describes as "never [having] been singular" and that "multiplicity is her identity, and [Am I the Drama?] reflects it without apology".

=== Year-end lists ===
Select rankings of Am I the Drama?
Publication	Accolade	Rank	Ref.
Billboard	The 50 Best Albums of 2025	19	
Complex	The 50 Best Albums of 2025	8	
HotNewHipHop	The 40 Best Rap Albums Of 2025	30	
HuffPost	The Best Albums Of 2025	—N/a	
Rolling Stone	The 100 Best Albums of 2025	60	

== Accolades ==
Award nominations for Am I the Drama?
Award	Year (Note: Indicates the year of ceremony. Each year is linked to the article about the awards held that year, wherever possible.)	Category	Result	Ref.
Guinness World Records	2025	Most deliveries by UAV drones in one hour	Won	
Guinness World Records	2025	Most signed items sold in 8 hours	Won	
Hollywood Music Video Awards	2026	Best Short Form Visualizer	Won	
NAACP Image Awards	2026	Outstanding Album	Won	
Webby Awards	2026	Best Prank, Stunt or Activation, Creator Excellence	Won	
Webby Awards	2026	Most Viral, Creator Excellence	Won	
American Music Awards	2026	Album of the Year	Nominated	
American Music Awards	2026	Best Hip-Hop Album	Won	
BET Awards	2026	Album of the Year	Nominated	
Grammy Awards	2027	Best Rap Album	Pending	

== Commercial performance ==
In the United States, Am I the Drama? debuted at number one on the Billboard 200, with first week sales of 200,000 album-equivalent units, consisting of 88,000 pure sales, 110,000 streaming-equivalent units (translated from 145.72 million on-demand streams) and 2,000 track-equivalent units. In doing so, Cardi B achieved her second consecutive number one album in the country, while earning the biggest sales week for an R&B/hip-hop album by a woman in 2025. She also became the only female rapper in history to have her first two albums debut atop the Billboard 200. Additionally, the album was certified platinum by the Recording Industry Association of America (RIAA) on its first day of release, and was certified double platinum after ten days of availability. It was later certified triple platinum by the RIAA in November 2025. The album has moved over 4.6 million units in the United States, as of February 2026. Additionally, of the twenty-three tracks that appear on the standard tracklist of Am I the Drama?, seventeen of them charted simultaneously on the Hot 100.

Outside of the United States, Am I the Drama? debuted at number six on the Billboard Canadian Albums chart, and number eight on the ARIA Top 50 Albums chart in Australia, becoming Cardi B's second consecutive top ten album in both countries, while also earning a double platinum certification in the former. Additionally, the album reached number one on the Australian Hip Hop/R&B Albums chart. The album charted moderately throughout Europe, attaining its highest position in the United Kingdom at number 26 with 4,254 equivalent sales, where it also reached number two on the UK Hip Hop and R&B Albums chart.

== Track listing ==
Am I the Drama? track listing
No.	Title	Writer(s)	Producer(s)	Length
1.	"Dead" (featuring Summer Walker)	Belcalis Almanzar; Jorden Thorpe; James Steed; Matthew Allen; Samuel Jiménez; Argel Lara; Saleem Allen; Omar Thorpe; Hide	DJ SwanQo; Sean Island; Smash David; Argel; Octane; Lateef; Hide	4:27
2.	"Hello"	Almanzar; J. Thorpe; Steed; M. Allen	DJ SwanQo; Sean Island; Smash David	2:35
3.	"Magnet"	Almanzar; J. Thorpe; Julius Rivera III; Lloyd McKenzie; Morris Jones; Maurice Washington; Steed; Darryl Clemons; Kevin Price; Timothy McKibbins	DJ SwanQo; Pooh Beatz; Go Grizzly; B100	2:58
4.	"Pick It Up" (featuring Selena Gomez)	Almanzar; J. Thorpe; Roosevelt Jean; Adrienne Ben Haim; Lewis Shoates; Philip Constable	DJ Hardwerk; Kuk Harrell^{[v]}	2:40
5.	"Imaginary Playerz"	Almanzar; J. Thorpe; Steed; M. Allen; S. Allen	DJ SwanQo; Sean Island; Octane	3:27
6.	"Bodega Baddie"	Almanzar; Jean; Fourtee Crawford; Kofi Amponsah; Gilbert Baba; Juan de los Santos	Ponzoo	1:44
7.	"Salute"	Almanzar; J. Thorpe; Bryan Simmons; Lesidney Ragland; Daan Huljbregts; Casey Millan; Quentin Shemwell; Gary Terrell Jr.; Tauheed Epps	TM88; Too Dope; Daan; Ric & Thadeus; Sensai	2:34
8.	"Safe" (featuring Kehlani)	Almanzar; Kehlani Parrish; J. Thorpe; Steed; M. Allen	DJ SwanQo; Sean Island	2:57
9.	"Man of Your Word" (featuring Dougie F)	Almanzar; Douglas Ford; Javaan Anderson; Jeff Kleinman	Kleinman	3:41
10.	"What's Goin On" (featuring Lizzo)	Almanzar; Melissa Jefferson; Jean; Anderson; Ben Haim; Shoates; Duwayne Mills; Constable; Ricky Reed; Linda Perry	DJ Hardwerk; Reed^{[a]}	3:24
11.	"Shower Tears" (featuring Summer Walker)	Almanzar; Nija Charles; Torae Carr; Jean; Jonathan Descartes; Avery Earl; Donnie Meadows; Scott Carter; Vanessa Wood; Ali Prawl	Triangle Park	3:27
12.	"Outside"	Almanzar; J. Thorpe; Jean; Yakki Davis; Ernest Brown III; Micaela Moore; Steed	Charlie Heat; HeyMicki; DJ SwanQo^{[c]}	3:26
13.	"Pretty & Petty"	Almanzar; J. Thorpe; Steed; M. Allen	DJ SwanQo; Sean Island	3:03
14.	"Better than You" (featuring Cash Cobain)	Almanzar; Cashmere Small; J. Thorpe; Anderson; Michael Mulé; Isaac De Boni; Anderson Hernandez; Norman Ingram	FnZ; Vinylz; Cash Cobain^{[a]}	4:01
15.	"On My Back" (featuring Lourdiz)	Almanzar; Alyssa Cantu; J. Thorpe; Brandon Hamlin; Shae Jacobs; James Harris; Terry Lewis	B HAM; Jacobs	3:51
16.	"ErrTime"	Almanzar; J. Thorpe; Anderson; Steed; M. Allen	DJ SwanQo; Sean Island	2:26
17.	"Check Please"	Almanzar; J. Thorpe; Steed; M. Allen	DJ SwanQo; Sean Island	2:01
18.	"Principal" (featuring Janet Jackson)	Almanzar; J. Thorpe; Monte Moir; Omar Perrin; Deandre Sumpter	Omar Grand; Dizzy Banko	2:17
19.	"Trophies"	Almanzar; Steed; M. Allen; O. Thorpe	DJ SwanQo; Sean Island; Lateef	3:02
20.	"Nice Guy" (featuring Tyla)	Almanzar; Tyla Seethal; Almando Cresso; Hailey Rusch; London Holmes; Javier Mercado; Steven Giron; Price	London on da Track; Synthetic; Venny; Go Grizzly^{[a]}	3:16
21.	"Killin You Hoes"	Almanzar; J. Thorpe; Edward Davadi; Steed; Jimenez; Don; Katrina Laverne Kearse	DJ SwanQo; Smash David; Don	3:49
22.	"Up"	Almanzar; Joshua Baker; Steed; M. Allen; J. Thorpe; Edis Selmani	DJ SwanQo; Sean Island; Pardison Fontaine; Yung Dza	2:36
23.	"WAP" (featuring Megan Thee Stallion)	Almanzar; Megan Pete; J. Thorpe; Austin Owens; James Foye III	Ayo & Keyz	3:07
Total length:				70:49

Ultimate Edition additional tracks
No.	Title	Writer(s)	Producer(s)	Length
24.	"Don't Do Too Much"	Almanzar; Deshon Gillian; Steed; J. Thorpe	DJ SwanQo; Brooklyn Johnny; Darrale Jones	2:21
25.	"ErrTime" (remix; featuring Latto)	Almanzar; Alyssa Michelle Stevens; J. Thorpe; Anderson; Steed; M. Allen	DJ SwanQo; Sean Island	2:26
26.	"ErrTime" (featuring Jeezy and Latto)	Almanzar; Stevens; Jay Wayne Jenkins; J. Thorpe; Anderson; Steed; M. Allen	DJ SwanQo; Sean Island	3:16
27.	"ErrTime" (remix; featuring Jeezy)	Almanzar; Jenkins; J. Thorpe; Anderson; Steed; M. Allen	DJ SwanQo; Sean Island	3:16
28.	"Money"	Almanzar	J. White Did It	3:03
29.	"Please Me" (with Bruno Mars)	Almanzar; Mars; James Fauntleroy; Jonathan Yip; Ray Romulus; Jeremy Reeves; Ray McCullough II	Mars; The Stereotypes	3:20
30.	"Press"	Almanzar; Derrick Milano; J. Thorpe; Dwane Weir; Klenord Raphael; Lewdini; Slade Da Monsta	Slade Da Monsta; Key Wane	2:23
31.	"Bongos" (featuring Megan Thee Stallion)	Almanzar; Pete	We Good; Breyan Isaac for the Thirties; DJ SwanQo	2:55
32.	"Like What (Freestyle)"	Almanzar	DJ SwanQo; Sean Island; OctaneThisThatGas; Lateef the Truthspeaker	2:16
33.	"Enough (Miami)"	Almanzar	DJ SwanQo; OG Parker; Romano	2:38
Total length:				104:23

=== Notes ===
- ^{^[c]} indicates a co-producer
- ^{^[a]} indicates an additional producer
- ^{^[v]} indicates a vocal producer
- The Apple Music Album Release Live Edition includes live performances of "Outside", "Imaginary Playerz", "Magnet", "Bodega Baddie", and "Pretty & Petty" as bonus videos.
- The digital Bonus Edition includes "Don't Do Too Much" as a bonus track.
- The digital ErrTime Edition includes the Latto remix of "ErrTime" as a bonus track.
- The digital Bardi Gang Edition includes "Money", "Please Me", "Press", "Bongos", "Like What (Freestyle)", and "Enough (Miami)" as bonus tracks, as well as a voice note titled "Dear Bardi Gang"; "Up" and "WAP" swap positions in this release.
- The digital Beat Edition includes the instrumentals of all standard tracks (excluding "Imaginary Playerz", "Bodega Baddie", "Outside", "Better than You", "On My Back", "Principal", and "WAP") as bonus tracks.
- The digital Snow Mix edition includes the Latto and Jeezy remixes of "ErrTime", as well as "Don't Do Too Much", as bonus tracks.

=== Samples and interpolations ===
- "Dead" samples "Bottom of the Map" (2005), written by Jay Jenkins and Demetrius Stewart, and performed by Jeezy.
- "Hello" interpolates "Dey Know" (2007), written by Jerold D. Evans, Carlos Walker, Sean B. Whittington, and performed by Shawty Lo.
- "Imaginary Playerz" samples "Imaginary Player" (1997), written by Shawn Carter, Daven Vanderpool, René Moore, Angela Winbush and Herman Chainey, and performed by Jay-Z, which itself samples "Imaginary Playmates" (1982), by René & Angela.
- "Bodega Baddie" samples "Ta Buena (Tipico)" (2002), written and performed by Magic Juan and "Gasolina" (2004), written by Ramón Ayala and Eddie Ávila, and performed by Daddy Yankee.
- "What's Goin On" interpolates "What's Up?" (1992), written by Linda Perry and performed by 4 Non Blondes.
- "Outside" contains elements of "Drag Rap (Triggerman)" (1986), written by Orville Hall and Phillip Price and performed by the Showboys.
- "Better than You" samples "Listen Dear” (1978), written and performed by Sassafras.
- "On My Back" contains elements of "Funny How Time Flies (When You're Having Fun)" (1986), written by James Harris, Terry Lewis and Janet Jackson as performed by Janet Jackson.
- "Check Please" interpolates "We Gonna Make It" (2001), written by Jason Phillips, David Styles, Alan Maman, and performed by Jadakiss.
- "Principal" contains elements of "The Pleasure Principle" (1986), written by Monte Moir as performed by Janet Jackson.
- "Killin You Hoes" contains a sample of "Killing You Hoes" (2008), written by Katrina Laverne Taylor and performed by Trina.
- "WAP" contains a sample of "Whores in This House" (1993), written and performed by Frank Ski.
- "Like What (Freestyle)" is a freestyle of "She's a Bitch" (1999), written by Melissa Elliott and Timothy Mosley, as performed by Missy Elliott.

== Personnel ==
Credits adapted from Tidal.

=== Musicians ===
- Cardi B – vocals
- Summer Walker – featured vocals (tracks 1, 11)
- Hadar Adora – background vocals (4)
- Selena Gomez – featured vocals (4)
- Kehlani – featured vocals (8)
- Dougie – additional vocals (9)
- Lizzo – featured vocals (10)
- Cash Cobain – featured vocals (14)
- Lourdiz – featured vocals (15)
- Janet Jackson – featured vocals (18)
- Tyla – featured vocals (20)
- Megan Thee Stallion – featured vocals (23)

=== Technical ===
- Leslie Brathwaite – mixing (1, 3–14, 17, 20–22)
- A. "Bainz" Bains – mixing, immersive mixing (2, 15, 16, 18)
- Aresh Banaji – mixing (2, 15, 16, 18)
- Evan LaRay – mixing (5, 9, 12), engineering (all tracks), co-mixing (2, 15, 16, 18)
- Nick Cavalieri – mixing (19)
- Colin Leonard – mastering
- David "Dos Dias" Bishop – engineering (1, 11)
- Shawn "Source" Jarrett – engineering (23)
- Kuk Harrell – vocal engineering (4)

== Charts ==
=== Weekly charts ===
Weekly chart performance
Chart (2025)	Peak position
Australian Albums (ARIA)	8
Australian Hip Hop/R&B Albums (ARIA)	1
Belgian Albums (Ultratop Flanders)	64
Belgian Albums (Ultratop Wallonia)	76
Canadian Albums (Billboard)	6
Dutch Albums (Album Top 100)	27
French Albums (SNEP)	48
Irish Albums (IRMA)	68
Japanese Download Albums (Billboard Japan)	72
New Zealand Albums (RMNZ)	19
Nigerian Albums (TurnTable)	20
Portuguese Albums (AFP)	99
Swiss Albums (Schweizer Hitparade)	28
UK Albums (Official Charts)	26
UK R&B Albums (OCC)	2
US Billboard 200	1
US Top R&B/Hip-Hop Albums (Billboard)	1

=== Year-end charts ===
Year-end chart performance
Chart (2025)	Position
US Billboard 200	166
US Top R&B/Hip-Hop Albums (Billboard)	47

== Certifications ==
Certifications
Region	Certification	Certified units/sales
Canada (Music Canada)	3× Platinum	240,000^{‡}
United States (RIAA)	3× Platinum	3,000,000^{‡}
^{‡} Sales+streaming figures based on certification alone.

== Release history ==
Am I the Drama? release history
Region	Date	Format	Edition	Label	Ref.
Various	September 19, 2025	CD; digital download; streaming; vinyl	Original	Atlantic	
Various	November 12, 2025	Digital download; streaming	Ultimate	Atlantic	
