= Enuff =

Enuff may refer to:

- "Enuff", a song by DJ Shadow from his 2006 album The Outsider
- Enuff, an alias of German musician Peter Fox

== See also ==
- Enuff Z'Nuff, an American musical group
