= Enough Said (film score) =

Enough Said (Original Motion Picture Score)

Film score by Marcelo Zarvos
- Released: September 17, 2013
- Recorded: 2013
- Studio: AIR Studios, London
- Genre: Film score
- Length: 35:06
- Label: Fox Music
- Producer: Marcelo Zarvos

Marcelo Zarvos chronology
The Hot Flashes (2013)	Enough Said (2013)	Reaching for the Moon (2013)

Enough Said (Original Motion Picture Score) is the film score composed by Marcelo Zarvos to the 2013 film Enough Said directed by Nicole Holofcener, and starring James Gandolfini and Julia Louis-Dreyfus. The film score was composed by Marcelo Zarvos and released through Fox Music on September 17, 2013.

== Background ==
Marcelo Zarvos composed the film score for Enough Said, collaborating with Holofcener for the second time after Please Give (2010). The score was recorded at the AIR Studios in London. Zarvos wanted the score to have minimalistic sounds that communicate the feelings between the lead pair, Eva and Albert. Zarvos utilized acoustic instruments and minimal orchestra to score the film.

== Release ==
Fox Music released the film score on September 17, 2013, a day before the film's release.

== Critical reception ==
Kaya Savas of Film.Music.Media wrote "The score feels perfect for these characters and the instrumentation echoes everything these characters are. There is just the right amount of energy behind it to give the music that charm, but the organic character touches are what make the score special. Musically, this is a wonderful experience. The score is genuine and the story it's telling is as well. This is a lovely score about people done in a way that Marcelo [Zarvos] does best." Sean Salisbury of Soundtrack.Net wrote "The score by Marcelo Zarvos follows this theme as well and fits the film's mood perfectly. Simple instruments and melodies make up most of the music and the soundtrack makes for a relaxing stand-alone listening experience."

Justin Chang of Variety wrote "Marcelo Zarvos' easy-listening score, usher the film in a soothingly banal direction." Todd McCarthy of The Hollywood Reporter described it as "melancholic". Ty Burr of The Boston Globe wrote "Marcelo Zarvos's shimmery background music sounds notes of melancholy". Joseph Walsh of CineVue wrote "there is Marcelo Zarvos' score, which really does let the whole piece down, intruding like an unwelcome dinner guest at a gathering of friends."

== Accolades ==
The score was shortlisted as one of the 114 contenders for Academy Award for Best Original Score at the 86th Academy Awards but was not nominated. It was nominated for the International Film Music Critics Association Award for Best Original Score for a Comedy Film which was lost to Theodore Shapiro for The Secret Life of Walter Mitty (2013).

== Track listing ==
No.	Title	Length
1.	"Eva and Albert"	2:08
2.	"Good Date"	0:48
3.	"Do You Want to Kiss"	1:20
4.	"Opening"	2:24
5.	"Eva Meets Albert"	1:13
6.	"Protecting Us"	2:08
7.	"Drive By"	1:00
8.	"Nice Paddles"	0:32
9.	"First Date with Albert"	0:30
10.	"Drive to Brunch"	0:49
11.	"Eva Meets Tess"	0:37
12.	"Busted"	1:33
13.	"Whose Car Is This?"	0:44
14.	"Eva Snoops"	0:52
15.	"Massage Montage #1"	0:56
16.	"Eva Figures It Out"	1:38
17.	"Thanksgiving"	1:09
18.	"Things We Fought About"	1:27
19.	"Meet Eva"	2:25
20.	"Lonely and Anxious"	1:20
21.	"I Thought You Actually Liked Me"	1:01
22.	"I Could Give You a Massage"	1:26
23.	"New Client"	1:26
24.	"Pillow Talk"	0:39
25.	"Massage Montage #2"	0:55
26.	"So Embarrassing"	0:47
27.	"Threesomes"	0:42
28.	"Beautiful Fruit"	0:41
29.	"Do You Want To Kiss" (Reprise)	1:56
Total length:		35:06

== Additional music ==
The songs were featured in the film, but not included in the soundtrack:

- "Neon Night" – written and performed by Craig Erickson
- "Love Alone (Jeremy Sole Remix)" – written by Andrew Spraggon and Trevor Rennie; performed by Sola Rosa
- "Way with Words" – written by Elisabeth Linton and Spencer Harrison; performed by Mideau
- "Red Star" – written by Matteo Curcio and Marinella Mastrosimone; performed by Musetta
- "Those Who Live for Love Will Live Forever" – written by Taraka Larson and Nimai Dasi Larson; performed by Prince Rama
- "So Come with Us" – written by Ben Kaniewski and Louise Alenius Boserup; performed by Lasse Boman
- "Harlot" – written by Andrew Wallace, Misun Wojcik and William Givens; performed by Misun
- "Comic Strip Bubbles" – written by Delphine Gardin, Sacha Toorop and Joel Grignard; performed by Monsoon
- "Venetian Ecstasy" – written by Alessandro Alessandroni and Alex Alessandroni; performed by Moo Industries Collective
- "Songs Without Words Op. 19, No. 1" – written by Felix Mendelssohn
- "Digging Shelters" – written and performed by Neil Halstead
- "I Like the Way This Is Going" – written by Mark Oliver Everett; performed by Eels
