= ErrTime =

Single by Cardi B

from the album Am I the Drama?
- Released: November 18, 2025
- Genre: Hip-hop
- Length: 2:26
- Label: Atlantic
- Songwriters: Belcalis Almánzar; Jordan Thorpe; Javaan Anderson; James Steed; Matthew Allen
- Producers: DJ SwanQo; Sean Island

Cardi B singles chronology
"Safe" (2025)	"ErrTime" (2025)	"Ah Ha" (2026)

Audio video
- "ErrTime" on YouTube

"ErrTime" is a song by American rapper Cardi B. The song was written by Cardi B, Jordan Thorpe, Javaan Anderson, and its producers James "DJ SwanQo" Steed and Matthew "Sean Island" Allen. Remixes with American rappers Latto and Jeezy were included separately on digital bonus editions of the album, as well as one with both featured together. The version featuring Jeezy was released to rhythmic contemporary radio on November 18, 2025 through Atlantic Records, as the fourth single from her second studio album, Am I the Drama? (2025). In 2026, the original version of "ErrTime" won the NAACP Image Award for Outstanding Hip Hop/Rap Song and the American Music Award for Favorite Rap/Hip Hop Song.

== Background ==
On September 18, 2025, Cardi B revealed the tracklist to her second studio album Am I the Drama?, including "ErrTime" as the sixteenth track. Following the album's release on September 19, Latto posted an Instagram story with the words "Latto is the drama" on September 24, teasing a collaboration. The duo previously worked together in 2023 on the song "Put It on da Floor Again", which reached number 13 on the Billboard Hot 100 and was certified platinum in the US. On September 24, Cardi B released the "ErrTime Edition" of Am I the Drama?, including a remix of "ErrTime" with Latto as a bonus track. Cardi B shared an image across her social platforms on November 11 showing a black crow perched on top of a snowman, captioned "Looks like there is a 100 percent chance of snow tomorrow at 12pm est ⛄️😏", to which Jeezy replied with a snowman emoji. She released "The Snow Mix" edition of the album the next day, including two new remixes of "ErrTime" as bonus tracks, one with Jeezy and another with both Latto and Jeezy. Atlantic Records serviced "ErrTime" to rhythmic contemporary radio on November 18 as the album's fourth single.

== Music and lyrics ==
In the song's opening verse, Cardi B calls out women who made moves on her husband Offset when they were together, rapping "If I take your nigga, I don’t wanna hear no cryin’ / Cause I ain’t say shit when hoes was out herе fuckin' mine." She also references Latto in the original version with the line "Bad yellow bitch, look like Latto in this motherfucker."

The Latto remix keeps most of the original song but replaces Cardi B's second verse with Latto's. Latto starts her verse with "Pop out, brand new body like I’m Carti in this motherfucker / Bitch, I’m giving belt out like karate in this motherfucker," referencing Playboi Carti's song "Pop Out" from his album Music (2025). She goes on to reference her own nickname and the album itself in the lines "Big Mama, fuck the small talk, what's the word, Ski? / I must be the drama, way he drop 200 first beat." Near the end of the verse, Latto describes her experiences at Fashion Week and how she must be "the drama" because a man cashed out on her after they spent a night together.

== Critical reception ==
Billboard staff ranked "ErrTime" as the sixth-best track on the album, comparing it to GloRilla and Cardi B's song "Tomorrow 2" and saying that the "track would have gotten a huge boost from a GloRilla feature." Writing for Vibe, Armon Sandler also ranked "ErrTime" the sixth-best song on the album, calling it an "anthem in every way". He compared the song structure to those from the 2000s and praised Cardi B and her team for doing "their homework on the type of songs that have staying power." He also praised Latto's feature on the remix, stating she "fit the record like a glove" and "seamlessly matched" Cardi B's energy. Uproxx's Aaron Williams further praised her "knockout verse that elevates the club fight song to a new plateau of electrifying excitement."

== Accolades ==
Awards and nominations for "ErrTime"
Organization	Year	Category	Result	Ref.
NAACP Image Awards	2026	Outstanding Hip Hop/Rap Song	Won	
BET Awards	2026	Best Collaboration	Nominated	
American Music Awards	2026	Favorite Rap/Hip Hop Song	Won	
Grammy Awards	2027	Best Rap Performance	Pending	
Grammy Awards	2027	Best Rap Song	Pending	

== Track listing ==
- Digital download
1. "ErrTime" (remix; with Latto) – 2:26
- Digital download
1. "ErrTime" (remix; with Jeezy) – 3:16
- Digital download
1. "ErrTime" (with Jeezy and Latto) – 3:16

== Credits and personnel ==
Credits were adapted from Tidal.

Musicians

- Cardi B – vocals, songwriter
- Latto – featured vocals (Latto remix)
- Jeezy – featured vocals (Jeezy remix)
- James "DJ SwanQo" Steed – producer, songwriter
- Matthew "Sean Island" Allen – producer, songwriter
- Jordan Thorpe – songwriter
- Javaan Anderson – songwriter
- Darrale Jones – executive producer
- Jonathan "Brooklyn Johnny" Descartes – executive producer

Technical

- Evan LaRay – recording engineer
- Colin Leonard – mastering engineer
- Leslie Brathwaite – mixing engineer

== Charts ==
Chart performance for "ErrTime"
Chart (2025–2026)	Peak position
US Billboard Hot 100	43
US Hot R&B/Hip-Hop Songs (Billboard)	8
US Rhythmic Airplay (Billboard)	1

== Release history ==
Release dates and formats for "ErrTime"
Region	Date	Format	Label	Ref.
United States	November 18, 2025	Rhythmic contemporary radio	Atlantic	
