= Enough (Miami) =

2024 single by Cardi B

Single by Cardi B
- B-side: "Like What (Freestyle)"
- Released: March 15, 2024
- Recorded: 2022
- Genre: Hip hop
- Length: 2:39
- Label: Atlantic
- Songwriter: Belcalis Almánzar
- Producers: DJ SwanQo; OG Parker; Romano

Cardi B singles chronology
"Bongos" (2023)	"Enough (Miami)" (2024)	"Puntería" (2024)

Music video
- "Enough (Miami)" on YouTube

"Enough (Miami)" is a song by American rapper Cardi B, released on March 15, 2024, through Atlantic Records. The song was included on a digital reissue of her second studio album Am I the Drama? (2025). It was her first solo single since "Up" (2021), it was released with an accompanying music video directed by Patience Harding. It is a rap and hip-hop song, written by Cardi B and produced by DJ SwanQo, OG Parker and Romano.

"Enough (Miami)" debuted at number nine on the Billboard Hot 100, becoming Cardi B's twelfth top-ten hit and her first solo top-ten since "Up" in 2021. It received a nomination for the Grammy Award for Best Rap Performance at the 67th Annual Grammy Awards, extending Cardi B's record as the female rapper with the most nominations in that category.

== Background ==
The song was first teased after a snippet of the track was premiered at a club on New Year's Day. The song was later previewed again via an Instagram snippet posted by Cardi B while teasing its release date. On March 12, she posted the song's cover art and officially announced the single.

Just a day prior to the single's release, Cardi B held a private listening party for the song via Zoom. "Enough (Miami)" was expected to appear on the rapper's upcoming second studio album, but ultimately did not make the standard edition tracklist; it was later included on the limited webstore-exclusive "Bardi Gang Edition" and then the "Ultimate Edition" on digital download and streaming.

== Music and lyrics ==
Produced by OG Parker and Romano, "Enough (Miami)" finds Cardi B taking aim at her opponents. It has been described as a "braggadocious rap number" in which she confidently talks up her style, saying "I do not see no competitors." In the first verse, she taunts her haters by rapping, "Bitches is washed, soap on the dishes/ I apply pressure like boa constrictors/ One bitch, two bitch, old bitch, new bitch/ None of y’all bitches not gon’ do shit." She delivers catchy innuendos and quippy rhymes such as "I’m gettin’ better and better-er" with her "usual bold-face flow" over "aggressive basslines".

On July 3, 2024, Joshua Fraustro and Miguel Aguilar, who make up producer duo Kemika1956, sued Cardi B for copyright infringement, alleging that the rapper used their 2021 track "Greasy Frybread" without permission on "Enough (Miami)".

== Music video ==
The music video was directed by Patience Harding and released alongside the song on March 15, 2024. The video bears the influence of Missy Elliott's videos and consists of Cardi B rapping the song’s lyrics on a blank soundstage. It flashes between shots of Cardi wearing a quintet of "skimpy high-fashion, thong-forward ensembles." In one outfit, she wears a black leather and spikes bondage gear kit, while in another she wears a full-length fur over a burgundy sling bikini and platform boots, as well as a copper pixie cut wig. Another look features a shiny helmet and oversized shades paired with a skimpy crimson tape bikini.

== Commercial performance ==
In the United States, "Enough (Miami)" debuted at number nine on the Billboard Hot 100 chart, marking Cardi B's twelfth top-ten hit and her first on her own since her last solo single "Up", which became her fifth number-one in 2021. The song started with 14.5 million streams, 8.8 million in radio audience and 37,000 sold, opening as her seventh leader on the Digital Song Sales chart.

== Accolades ==
Awards and nominations for "Enough (Miami)"
Organization	Year	Category	Result	Ref.
Grammy Awards	2025	Best Rap Performance	Nominated	

== Track listing ==
- Streaming/digital download
1. "Enough (Miami)" (explicit) – 2:38
2. "Enough (Miami)" (clean) – 2:38
3. "Enough (Miami)" (acapella; explicit) – 2:38
4. "Enough (Miami)" (acapella; clean) – 2:38
5. "Enough (Miami)" (sped up; explicit) – 2:18
6. "Enough (Miami)" (slowed down; explicit) – 2:57
7. "Enough (Miami)" (sped up; clean) – 2:18
8. "Enough (Miami)" (slowed down; clean) – 2:57
9. "Enough (Miami)" (Bronx drill mix; explicit) – 2:22
10. "Enough (Miami)" (Bronx drill mix; clean) – 2:22
11. "Enough (Miami)" (Bronx drill mix; instrumental) – 2:22
12. "Enough (Miami)" (instrumental) – 2:38
- 7-inch vinyl
1. "Enough (Miami)" – 2:38
2. "Like What (Freestyle)" – 2:16

== Charts ==
=== Weekly charts ===
Weekly chart performance for "Enough (Miami)"
Chart (2024)	Peak position
Canada Hot 100 (Billboard)	75
Global 200 (Billboard)	24
New Zealand Hot Singles (RMNZ)	9
Nigeria (TurnTable Top 100)	51
Sweden Heatseeker (Sverigetopplistan)	7
UK Singles (Official Charts)	85
US Billboard Hot 100	9
US Hot R&B/Hip-Hop Songs (Billboard)	3
US Rhythmic Airplay (Billboard)	3

=== Year-end charts ===
2024 year-end chart performance for "Enough (Miami)"
Chart (2024)	Position
US Hot R&B/Hip-Hop Songs (Billboard)	46
US Rhythmic (Billboard)	31

== Certifications ==
Certifications for "Enough (Miami)"
Region	Certification	Certified units/sales
Canada (Music Canada)	Gold	40,000^{‡}
^{‡} Sales+streaming figures based on certification alone.

== Release history ==
Release dates and formats for "Enough (Miami)"
Region	Date	Format	Version	Label	Ref.
Various	March 15, 2024	Digital download; streaming	Original; acapella; instrumental	Atlantic	
Various	March 18, 2024	Digital download; streaming	Sped up; slowed down	Atlantic	
United States	March 19, 2024	Rhythmic contemporary radio; urban contemporary radio	Original	Atlantic	
Various	March 20, 2024	Digital download; streaming	Bronx drill mix; Bronx drill mix instrumental	Atlantic	
United States	March 22, 2024	CD	Original	Atlantic	
United States	July 26, 2024	7-inch vinyl	Original	Atlantic	

== See also ==
- List of Billboard Hot 100 top-ten singles in 2024
- List of Billboard Digital Song Sales number ones of 2024
