= Bongos (song) =

- Standard cover (Note: Physical editions feature two alternative covers.)

Single by Cardi B featuring Megan Thee Stallion
- Released: September 8, 2023
- Recorded: 2023
- Genre: Funk carioca; dirty-rap
- Length: 2:55 (original); 2:31 (alternate mix)
- Label: Atlantic
- Composers: Breyan Isaac; Carlos Londono; Chaniah Kelley; Donny Flores; James D. Steed
- Lyricists: Cardi B; Megan Pete
- Producers: We Good; Breyan Isaac for the Thirties; DJ SwanQo

Cardi B singles chronology
"Jealousy" (2023)	"Bongos" (2023)	"Enough (Miami)" (2024)

Megan Thee Stallion singles chronology
"Her" (2022)	"Bongos" (2023)	"Cobra" (2023)

Music video
- "Bongos" on YouTube

"Bongos" is a song by American rapper Cardi B featuring fellow American rapper-songwriter Megan Thee Stallion. It was released on September 8, 2023, through Atlantic Records. The song was included on a digital reissue of her second studio album Am I the Drama? (2025). "Bongos" marks the pair's second collaboration, following their 2020 hit song "WAP". The song debuted at number 14 on the US Billboard Hot 100.

== Background ==
Cardi B and Megan Thee Stallion announced "Bongos" on September 4, sharing its cover artwork and release date on social media. Cardi B had announced to Vogue México y Latinoamérica in August 2023 that she was not going to release any more collaborations before her next solo single. It was not shared that "Bongos" would be included on her upcoming second studio album. Cardi B later explained that the song had been "part of a plan for a minute now" and called it "just one of those records where you need somebody", revealing that she "chopped" up the verses Megan Thee Stallion had sent her, also calling Megan her "work wife".

== Composition ==
The bongos are a type of Afro-Cuban drum. The song has an incessant male spoken word beat ("bong, bong, ...") that introduces the song and persists throughout the chorus and verses. Variety's Thania Garcia remarked that the song has "Latin-infused beats" on which the pair "spit their verses over a twerk-worthy bassline".

== Music video ==
The music video was released alongside the song on September 8, 2023. It was directed by Tanu Muino in Beverly Hills and Malibu, California with a budget of 2 million dollars. In an interview for iHeartRadio, Cardi B explained that her first intention was to film the video outside the United States, but the Atlantic hurricane season forced the project to be shot in Malibu.

The location is the Beverly Estate in Beverly Hills, previously featured Beyoncé's visual album, Black Is King. The video also presents choreographies and references in costumes and filming to Beyoncé's film. It shows Cardi B and Megan Thee Stallion at a beach "wearing over-the-top accessories and custom fits". Cardi B called the video "intricate" and "beautiful" and felt it has a "whole complete different type of theme".

== Live performances ==
On September 12, 2023, Cardi B and Megan Thee Stallion performed "Bongos" for the first time at the 2023 MTV Video Music Awards. The performance began with Cardi descending to the stage from atop a large disco ball, after which the duo performed a dance routine dressed in sparkly blue outfits surrounded by background dancers. Justin Curto of Vulture praised the performance as a highlight of the night, whereas Pitchfork's Madison Bloom described it as "boring" and less memorable than the pair's first collaboration "WAP".

== Accolades ==
Awards and nominations for "Bongos"
Year	Organization	Award	Result	Ref(s)
2023	MTV Europe Music Awards	Best Video	Nominated	

== Track listings ==
- Streaming/digital download
  1. "Bongos" – 2:55
  2. "WAP" – 3:07
- Streaming/digital download – Bongos: The Pack
  1. "Bongos" (explicit) – 2:55
  2. "Bongos" (clean) – 2:55
  3. "Bongos" (alternate mix) – 2:31
  4. "Bongos" (sped up) – 2:34
  5. "Bongos" (DJ edit) – 2:47
  6. "Bongos" (radio edit) – 2:31
  7. "Bongos" (instrumental) – 2:55
  8. "Bongos" (alternate mix instrumental) – 2:31
- Streaming/digital download – DJ SpinKing and DJ Taj Jersey club mix
  1. "Bongos" (DJ SpinKing and DJ Taj Jersey club mix) – 1:37

== Charts ==
=== Weekly charts ===
Weekly chart performance for "Bongos"
Chart (2023)	Peak position
Australia (ARIA)	78
Australia Hip Hop/R&B (ARIA)	16
Canada Hot 100 (Billboard)	43
Global 200 (Billboard)	26
Ireland (IRMA)	64
Lithuania (AGATA)	12
New Zealand Hot Singles (RMNZ)	6
Nigeria (TurnTable Top 100)	71
Sweden Heatseeker (Sverigetopplistan)	15
UK Singles (Official Charts)	35
UK Hip Hop/R&B (Official Charts)	16
US Billboard Hot 100	14
US Hot R&B/Hip-Hop Songs (Billboard)	4
US R&B/Hip-Hop Airplay (Billboard)	5
US Rhythmic Airplay (Billboard)	2

=== Year-end charts ===
Annual chart rankings
Chart (2023)	Position
US Hot R&B/Hip-Hop Songs (Billboard)	92
US Digital Song Sales (Billboard)	73

Chart (2024)	Position
US Hot R&B/Hip-Hop Songs (Billboard)	78

== Certifications ==
Certifications for "Bongos"
Region	Certification	Certified units/sales
Canada (Music Canada)	Platinum	80,000^{‡}
^{‡} Sales+streaming figures based on certification alone.

== Release history ==
Release dates and formats for "Bongos"
Region	Date	Format	Version	Label	Ref.
Various	September 8, 2023	CD; digital download; streaming	Original	Atlantic	
Italy	September 8, 2023	Radio airplay	Original	Warner	
Various	September 11, 2023	Digital download; streaming	The Pack EP	Atlantic	
Various	September 14, 2023	Digital download; streaming	Jersey club mix	Atlantic	
