= Pardison Fontaine =

American rapper and songwriter (born 1989)

- Also known as: Pardi; Jordan Thorpe
- Born: Jorden Kyle Lanier Thorpe; December 29, 1989 (age 36); Newburgh, New York, U.S.
- Genres: Hip hop
- Occupations: Rapper; songwriter
- Years active: 2011–present
- Label: Atlantic
- Partner: Megan Thee Stallion (2020–2023)
- Children: 1

Jorden Kyle Lanier Thorpe (born December 29, 1989), better known by his stage name Pardison Fontaine, is an American rapper and songwriter from Newburgh, New York. He is best known for his 2018 single "Backin' It Up" (featuring Cardi B), which peaked at number 40 on the US Billboard Hot 100, received platinum certification by the Recording Industry Association of America (RIAA), and led him to sign with Atlantic Records. The label released his debut studio album, Under8ed (2019), which failed to chart.

Along with his recording career, Thorpe has been credited as co-writer on songs for other artists, such as Kanye West ("Yikes", "Ghost Town", and "All Mine"), Cardi B ("Bodak Yellow", "I Like It", "Wild Side", "WAP", and "Up"), and Megan Thee Stallion ("Savage Remix" and "WAP"). At the 63rd Annual Grammy Awards, Thorpe won Best Rap Song for his contributions to the latter's single, "Savage Remix".

== Career ==
In August 2015, Fontaine released his debut mixtape, Not Supposed to Be Here. In 2016, he met fellow New York City-based rapper Cardi B, with whom he would work closely in the years following. In June 2018, Fontaine co-wrote songs for rapper Kanye West's eighth studio album, Ye, including "Violent Crimes." In August 2018, he released the single "Say What I Want". In September 2018, he released the single "Backin' It Up" (featuring Cardi B), which peaked at number 40 on the US Billboard Hot 100 chart. They performed the song live at the 2018 BET Hip Hop Awards.

Fontaine released his debut extended play (EP), Sext8pe on December 12, 2023 — the same day the music video for its lead single, "That's Cute", was published on YouTube. Fontaine has stated that the EP is an "audio mashup of the creative [he's] become." He also called it a "brief overview of who [he's] become as a person" and that it was inspired by "love, heartbreak, and all the highs and lows of these things we call relationships. A wide spectrum of emotions and texture, a taste of what is yet to come." The only collaboration on Sext8pe was "Sexyy & Conceited" which features Southern rapper Sexyy Red. "Shake Sum," the EP's second single, was accompanied by a music video published on January 17, 2024.

== Personal life ==
In November 2016, Fontaine's daughter was born.

He was in a public relationship with fellow rapper Megan Thee Stallion from 2020 to 2023.

In November 2023, Fontaine responded to cheating allegations concerning his past relationship with Megan Thee Stallion through the release of his single "Thee Person". He later denied the accusations in an interview on radio program The Breakfast Club.

== Discography ==
=== Studio albums ===
List of studio albums, with selected details
Title	Details
Under8ed	Released: November 15, 2019; Label: Atlantic; Format: Digital download, streaming

=== Extended plays ===
List of extended plays, with selected details
Title	Details
Sext8pe	Released: December 12, 2023; Label: Section 8 Format; Format: Digital download, streaming

=== Mixtapes ===
List of mixtapes, with selected details
Title	Details
Not Supposed to Be Here	Released: August 4, 2015; Label: Self-released; Format: Digital download, streaming

=== Singles ===
==== As lead artist ====
List of singles as lead artist, with selected chart positions, showing year released and album name
Title	Year	Peak chart positions		Certifications	Album
Title	Year	US	US R&B /HH	Certifications	Album
"Oyyy"	2013	—	—		Not Supposed to Be Here
"Bobby Brown"	2015	—	—		Not Supposed to Be Here
"Black History Month"	2016	—	—		Non-album singles
"Woooa"	2016	—	—		Non-album singles
"In the Field"	2017	—	—		Non-album singles
"Food Stamps"	2017	—	—		Non-album singles
"Jumpin Jumpin"	2017	—	—		Non-album singles
"Hangin Off Me"	2017	—	—		Non-album singles
"For the Win"	2017	—	—		Non-album singles
"Backin' It Up" (featuring Cardi B)	2018	40	19	RIAA: Platinum	Under8ed
"Madden Flow"	2019	—	—		Non-album single
"Rodman"	2019	—	—		Under8ed
"Peach" (featuring City Girls)	2019	—	—		Under8ed
"Shea Butter"	2019	—	—		Under8ed
"Take It Down" (featuring Offset)	2019	—	—		Under8ed
"By Myself"	2021	—	—		Non-album singles
"Hoop Earrings"	2022	—	—		Non-album singles
"Safe Word" (with Mr.Chicken)	2022	—	—		Non-album singles
"Thee Person"	2023	—	—		Non-album singles
"That's Cute"	2023	—	—		Sext8pe
"Polygamy"	2023	—	—		Non-album single
"Shake Sum"	2024	—	—		Sext8pe
"Show Me Love"	2024	—	—		Sext8pe
"Who Told You"	2024	—	—		Non-album single
"Run Run Run"	2024	—	—		Sext8pe
"Toot It Up" (with Cardi B)	2025	—	—		Non-album single

==== As featured artist ====
List of singles as featured artist, showing year released and album name
Title	Year	Album
"C.R.E.A.Mix" (Jonny Prise featuring Pardison Fontaine)	2017	The Book of Jonny: New Wavelations
"How I Feel" (Bynoe featuring Pardison Fontaine)	2017	Sweet Sight for Sour Eyes
"Biotchhh" (Klean Söze featuring Pardison Fontaine)	2018	Non-album singles
"Iceberg" (Dougie F featuring Pardison Fontaine)	2018	Non-album singles

== Songwriting credits ==
Title	Year	Artist	Album
"Washpoppin"	2016	Cardi B	Gangsta Bitch Music, Vol. 1
"Bodak Yellow"	2017	Cardi B	Invasion of Privacy
"No Limit" (featuring ASAP Rocky and Cardi B)	2017	G-Eazy	The Beautiful & Damned
"Be Careful"	2018	Cardi B	Invasion of Privacy
"Get Up 10"	2018	Cardi B	Invasion of Privacy
"Drip" (featuring Migos)	2018	Cardi B	Invasion of Privacy
"Best Life" (featuring Chance the Rapper)	2018	Cardi B	Invasion of Privacy
"I Like It" (with Bad Bunny and J Balvin)	2018	Cardi B	Invasion of Privacy
"Ring" (featuring Kehlani)	2018	Cardi B	Invasion of Privacy
"Money Bag"	2018	Cardi B	Invasion of Privacy
"She Bad" (with YG)	2018	Cardi B	Invasion of Privacy
"Thru Your Phone"	2018	Cardi B	Invasion of Privacy
"I Do" (featuring SZA)	2018	Cardi B	Invasion of Privacy
"Taki Taki" (featuring Selena Gomez, Ozuna and Cardi B)	2018	DJ Snake	Carte Blanche
"Yikes"	2018	Kanye West	Ye
"All Mine"	2018	Kanye West	Ye
"Wouldn't Leave" (featuring PartyNextDoor)	2018	Kanye West	Ye
"Ghost Town" (featuring PartyNextDoor)	2018	Kanye West	Ye
"Violent Crimes"	2018	Kanye West	Ye
"Girls" (featuring Cardi B, Bebe Rexha and Charli XCX)	2018	Rita Ora	Phoenix
"South of the Border" (featuring Camila Cabello and Cardi B)	2019	Ed Sheeran	No.6 Collaborations Project
"Rodeo" (with Cardi B)	2019	Lil Nas X	7
"Yes" (with Cardi B and Anuel AA)	2019	Fat Joe	Family Ties
"WAP" (featuring Megan Thee Stallion)	2020	Cardi B	Am I the Drama?
"Circles"	2020	Megan Thee Stallion	Good News
"Savage Remix" (featuring Beyoncé)	2020	Megan Thee Stallion	Good News
"Up"	2021	Cardi B	Am I the Drama?
"Wild Side" (featuring Cardi B)	2021	Normani	Dopamine
"Hot Shit" (with Kanye West and Lil Durk)	2022	Cardi B	Non-album single
"Pressurelicious" (featuring Future)	2022	Megan Thee Stallion	Traumazine
"Tomorrow 2" (featuring Cardi B)	2022	GloRilla	Anyways, Life's Great...
"Bongos" (featuring Megan Thee Stallion)	2023	Cardi B	Non-album single
"Outside"	2025	Cardi B	Am I the Drama?
"Imaginary Playerz"	2025	Cardi B	Am I the Drama?
"Dead" (featuring Summer Walker)	2025	Cardi B	Am I the Drama?
"Hello"	2025	Cardi B	Am I the Drama?
"Magnet"	2025	Cardi B	Am I the Drama?
"Pick It Up" (featuring Selena Gomez)	2025	Cardi B	Am I the Drama?
"Salute"	2025	Cardi B	Am I the Drama?
"Safe" (featuring Kehlani)	2025	Cardi B	Am I the Drama?
"Pretty & Petty"	2025	Cardi B	Am I the Drama?
"Better Than You" (featuring Cash Cobain)	2025	Cardi B	Am I the Drama?
"On My Back" (featuring Lourdiz)	2025	Cardi B	Am I the Drama?
"ErrTime"	2025	Cardi B	Am I the Drama?
"Check Please"	2025	Cardi B	Am I the Drama?
"Principal" (featuring Janet Jackson)	2025	Cardi B	Am I the Drama?
"Killin You Hoes"	2025	Cardi B	Am I the Drama?
