= Up (Cardi B song) =

2021 single by Cardi B

Single by Cardi B
- Released: February 5, 2021
- Recorded: 2020
- Genre: Hip-hop; trap; pop-rap
- Length: 2:36
- Label: Atlantic
- Songwriters: Belcalis Almanzar; Edis Selmani; James Steed; Jorden Thorpe; Joshua Baker; Matthew Allen
- Producers: DJ SwanQo; Pardison Fontaine; Sean Island; Yung Dza

Cardi B singles chronology
"Me Gusta" (2020)	"Up" (2021)	"Wild Side" (2021)

Music video
- "Up" on YouTube

"Up" is a song by American rapper Cardi B. It was released on February 5, 2021, through Atlantic Records. It was included on her second studio album Am I the Drama? (2025). The track is a pop-rap and hip-hop song, co-written by Cardi B with Edis Selmani, James Steed, Jorden Thorpe, Joshua Baker, and Matthew Allen and produced by DJ SwanQo, Pardison Fontaine, Sean Island, and Yung Dza.

"Up" reached number one on the US Billboard Hot 100, making Cardi B the only female rapper to top the chart with multiple solo singles, following "Bodak Yellow". It previously debuted at number two on the chart, which at the time marked the highest debut for a solo female rap song since Lauryn Hill's "Doo Wop (That Thing)" in 1998, and became her second number-one debut on the Rolling Stone Top 100. It also reached the top ten in Canada, Greece, and Ireland, and became her second top five debut on the Billboard Global 200. The song was the fourth-bestselling hip-hop song of 2021 in the US.

"Up" received a nomination for the Grammy Award for Best Rap Performance at the 2022 Grammys, extending Cardi B's record as the female rapper with the most nominations in that category. It won the American Music Award for Favorite Rap/Hip Hop Song, making Cardi B the first artist to win the category three times. The music video received nominations for the BET Award for Video of the Year and the American Music Award for Video of the Year. She performed the song at the 63rd Annual Grammy Awards on March 14, 2021.

== Background ==
On August 7, 2020, Cardi B released the single "WAP", featuring American rapper Megan Thee Stallion. The song achieved worldwide success, reaching number one in multiple countries, including Australia, Canada, and the UK. The single also spent a total of four weeks atop the Billboard Hot 100. On October 1, 2020, it was revealed that she was already "plotting her next move". However, she also clarified that she does not desire to put out music too frequently in order not to succumb to the label's pressure, saying "I feel like I'm not gonna let that shit get to me to the point that I'm gonna put out a song that I'm not really in love with just 'cause". On January 31, 2021, the rapper teased towards an announcement she was going to make the day after. She revealed the song title alongside the cover art the following day, February 1. The song was released on February 5. In an interview with Apple Music's Zane Lowe, the rapper stated that "Up" is inspired by Chicago drill music, which also influenced her first mixtape Gangsta Bitch Music, Vol. 1. "If it's up then it's stuck" is colloquialism for "street beef." In 2022, Cardi B confirmed that "Up" would appear on her upcoming second studio album. When asked about the meaning of the song on The Tonight Show, she responded, with "nothing."

== Critical reception ==
In Pitchfork, Cat Zhang stated that "Up" has "Cardi's characteristic self-assurance and instantly quotable one-liners", praising it as "a solid showing." Zhang also added that Cardi B "is skilled at these types of brusque taunts" as "her taut delivery drives the song." Lindsay Zoladz of The New York Times declared that Cardi B's "preferred method of annihilating the haters is oxygen deprivation" considering that "her flow is so relentless that for nearly three minutes she doesn't offer listeners a single moment to catch their breath." Zoladz also wrote that Cardi B "raps with rapturous alliteration, before running that tongue twister back again, in case you didn't catch it all the first time," and commented that her tone is a bit more cheerful "than the drill influence would suggest", featuring "some classically comedic Cardi punch lines, but the ravenous way she digs into this beat is serious business." Kyann-Sian Williams of NME opined that "Cardi's lyricism stands up many of her peers" while "proving that she still has plenty of fresh bars," further adding that the rapper "created a new power anthem with this one." Ben Beaumont-Thomas of The Guardian wrote that "Cardi B deserves the crown", and called the song "a blast of pure entertainment" that "flaires out her favoured consonant in a spittle-drenching, supremely satisfying tongue twister", while speaking on the Grammy nomination.

=== Accolades ===
Critical rankings for "Up"
Publication	Critics' lists	Rank	Ref.
Billboard	The Best Songs of 2021	22	
The New York Times (Lindsay Zoladz)	Best Songs of 2021	10	
Spotify	RapCaviar's Best Hip-Hop Songs of 2021	2	

== Commercial performance ==
In the United States, "Up" debuted at number two on the Billboard Hot 100 chart, marking the highest debut for a solo female rap song since Lauryn Hill's "Doo Wop (That Thing)" in 1998. It became Cardi B's ninth top-ten single on the Hot 100, and opened atop both Digital Song Sales and Streaming Songs charts, where it marked Cardi B's fifth and fourth leader, respectively. The single also started at number one on both the Hot R&B/Hip-Hop Songs and Hot Rap Songs charts, which use the same methodology as the Hot 100, with Cardi B achieving her sixth and fifth leader, respectively. Cardi B has achieved at least one top 10 in each of the last five years, dating to her first number one single "Bodak Yellow" in 2017. Before reaching the summit, it spent four weeks in the top five, including three at number two. The week after her Grammy Awards performance, "Up" reached number one on the Hot 100 rising six spots to number one, causing Cardi B to become the sole female rapper to top the chart several times with solo songs, after "Bodak Yellow", and furthered her record as the female rap artist with the most number-one hits on the Hot 100 as her fifth song to top the chart. "Up" received 22.7 million U.S. streams and 18,000 digital song sales in the week ending March 18, according to MRC Data. It also attracted 34.9 million radio airplay audience impressions (up 7%) in that week. Dating to her first week atop the Hot 100 with "Bodak Yellow" in 2017, Cardi B ties for the second most number-one hits among all acts with Ariana Grande, Drake leads with six.

Cardi B also tied Taylor Swift for the most number ones on the US Streaming Songs chart among women, with four each. She joined a three-way tie for the third most number-ones among all artists, Justin Bieber is second with five and Drake leading with ten. "Up" debuted at number one on the Rolling Stone Top 100, becoming both Cardi B's second number-one single and second number-one debut on that chart, as well as the first time a female rapper debuts atop the chart with a solo song. "Up" has spent two weeks at number one on that chart. The single opened at number four on the Billboard Global 200, becoming her second top-five debut on the chart. It was Billboard's top female rap song and top female R&B/hip-hop song of 2021.

== Music video ==
To resemble "water flowing across her body", the rapper wears a "transparent ensemble" on top of a glass table in one of the scenes, custom made with thermoplastic by Amsterdam-based designer Esmay Wagemans.

The music video, directed by Tanu Muino, was shot in a Los Angeles studio on January 16–17, 2021, and was released on Cardi B's official YouTube channel alongside the song on February 5, 2021. The official lyric video and the first part of the behind-the-scenes video series were released on February 9. Cardi B mainly worked with independent fashion designers and custom-made brands for statement pieces depicted in the music video.

=== Synopsis ===
The music video opens with Cardi B wearing a black ensemble as she stands on top of a coffin with a headstone that reads, "RIP 2020." Considered by Harper's Bazaar a reference to Patrick Magaud's book Exhibition in Paris, the graveyard look features Louboutin shoes with back seam stockings, a crystal corset, and a custom black roses hat. Her "fishtail braid" is decorated with cross appliques and black roses. The next scene sees Cardi B in an "angelic" white ball gown with nail gloves and a crystal neckpiece while posing on the hood of a supersized car portraying The Spirit of Ecstasy. For the dance routine, Cardi Bardi wears a custom powder blue velour outfit and spray-painted sneakers, combining elements of Jean Paul Gaultier's 1984 design and vintage sportswear clothing.

Attached to her hair, a number of doll heads speak the line "I know that's right". For the scene where she appears inside a giant clam, the rapper's mermaid-esque bodysuit features a baroque porcelain-finish corset, hip piece, leg pieces, matching handpieces and stripper heels in the same porcelain. The clear look in the champagne scene is a custom transparent plastic aquatic piece, while she sits on a see-through chair held up by a naked man. For the closing scene, she leads a troupe of dancers and sports a black leather bondage bodysuit and fringe-trimmed arm warmers. In this scene, she wears a "sculptural hairstyle" inspired by Left Eye. In the music video Cardi B has a kiss with two women.

=== Reception ===
The video was acclaimed by critics. In Harper's Bazaar, Bianca Betancourt stated that the rapper "raises the bar again" with the "bold" music video, "showing off a number of showstopping, high-fashion looks." Kalleigh Fasanella of Allure wrote about Cardi B's "willingness to experiment with boundary-pushing beauty looks." Mario Abad of Paper commented that the fashion "captured Cardi's provocative style approach and penchant for statement pieces." Eric Torres of Pitchfork stated that "if there's one thing Cardi B will absolutely do, it's turn a music video into a playground for orgiastic visuals dripping in high fashion" adding that "Cardi keeps the high-femme, playful imagery at an all-time high." Torres considered the rapper in a transparent bodysuit sitting in a chair held up by a naked man the best visual, deeming it "a consummate snapshot of Cardi: so confidently in control that it looks like an honor just to be her furniture."

=== TikTok ===
The dance routine in the music video, choreographed by Sean Bankhead, inspired a dance challenge on the video-sharing app TikTok, with users performing the moves. Posts by other celebrities and courier employees received media coverage. The dance routine was performed by Leslie Jones during a sketch for the 2021 MTV Movie & TV Awards.

== Awards ==
Awards and nominations for "UP"
Year	Organization	Award	Result	Ref.
2021	BET Awards	Video of the Year	Nominated	
2021	BET Hip Hop Awards	Song of the Year	Nominated	
2021	BET Hip Hop Awards	Best Hip-Hop Video	Nominated	
2021	American Music Awards	Favorite Rap/Hip-Hop Song	Won	
2021	American Music Awards	Video of the Year	Nominated	
2021	People's Choice Awards	The Music Video of 2021	Nominated	
2022	Grammy Awards	Best Rap Performance	Nominated	
2022	iHeartRadio Music Awards	Hip-Hop Song of the Year	Nominated	
2022	iHeartRadio Music Awards	TikTok Bop of the Year	Nominated	
2022	Kids' Choice Awards	Favorite Song	Nominated	
2022	ASCAP Pop Music Awards	Winning Songs	Won	

== Live performances ==
Cardi B performed "Up" and "WAP" for the first time at the 63rd Annual Grammy Awards, airing on CBS on March 14, 2021. She appeared in a metallic armor ensemble while sporting a light purple pixie hairstyle. For the number, vibrant graphics appeared about the stage.

== In other media ==
"Up" was played in the TV series Abbott Elementary during the episode "Step Class", where characters danced to the song. The song was also played and referenced in the 2022 film A Madea Homecoming. The song also served as the theme song of SummerSlam (2021).The song was also played in the first episode of the television series, The Summer I Turned Pretty

== Credits and personnel ==
Credits adapted from Tidal.

- Cardi B – vocals, songwriting
- Yung Dza – production, songwriting
- Sean Island – production, songwriting
- DJ SwanQo – production, songwriting
- Joshua Baker – songwriting
- Jordan Thorpe – songwriting
- Evan LaRay – engineering
- Colin Leonard – mastering
- Leslie Brathwaite – mixing

== Charts ==
=== Weekly charts ===
Chart performance for "Up"
Chart (2021—2025)	Peak position
Australia (ARIA)	11
Australia Urban (ARIA)	4
Austria (Ö3 Austria Top 40)	69
Belgium (Ultratip Bubbling Under Flanders)	1
Canada Hot 100 (Billboard)	7
Canada CHR/Top 40 (Billboard)	39
Czech Republic Singles Digital (ČNS IFPI)	76
Euro Digital Songs (Billboard)	17
France (SNEP)	169
Germany (GfK)	99
Global 200 (Billboard)	4
Greece International (IFPI)	5
Hungary (Single Top 40)	17
Hungary (Stream Top 40)	24
Iceland (Tónlistinn)	30
Ireland (IRMA)	10
Lithuania (AGATA)	2
Netherlands (Single Top 100)	94
New Zealand (Recorded Music NZ)	14
Portugal (AFP)	36
Romania (Airplay 100)	44
Singapore (RIAS)	29
Slovakia (Singles Digitál Top 100)	22
Sweden (Sverigetopplistan)	97
Switzerland (Schweizer Hitparade)	47
UK Singles (Official Charts)	16
UK Hip Hop/R&B (Official Charts)	7
US Billboard Hot 100	1
US Hot R&B/Hip-Hop Songs (Billboard)	1
US R&B/Hip-Hop Airplay (Billboard)	2
US Pop Airplay (Billboard)	20
US Rhythmic Airplay (Billboard)	1
US Rolling Stone Top 100	1

=== Year-end charts ===
Year-end chart performance for "Up"
Chart (2021)	Position
Australia (ARIA)	46
Canada (Canadian Hot 100)	50
Global 200 (Billboard)	54
Hungary (Stream Top 40)	84
UK Singles (OCC)	89
US Billboard Hot 100	26
US Hot R&B/Hip-Hop Songs (Billboard)	4
US Rhythmic (Billboard)	13

== Certifications ==
Certifications for "Up"
Region	Certification	Certified units/sales
Australia (ARIA)	4× Platinum	280,000^{‡}
Canada (Music Canada)	5× Platinum	400,000^{‡}
France (SNEP)	Gold	100,000^{‡}
New Zealand (RMNZ)	2× Platinum	60,000^{‡}
Poland (ZPAV)	Platinum	50,000^{‡}
Portugal (AFP)	Gold	5,000^{‡}
United Kingdom (BPI)	Platinum	600,000^{‡}
United States (RIAA)	5× Platinum	5,000,000^{‡}
^{‡} Sales+streaming figures based on certification alone.

== Release history ==
Release dates and formats for "Up"
Region	Date	Format(s)	Label	Ref.
Various	February 5, 2021	CD single; digital download; streaming	Atlantic	
United States	February 9, 2021	Contemporary hit radio; rhythmic radio	Atlantic	
United States	March 2, 2021	Contemporary hit radio	Atlantic	

== See also ==
- List of Billboard Hot 100 number ones of 2021
