= Cardi B discography =

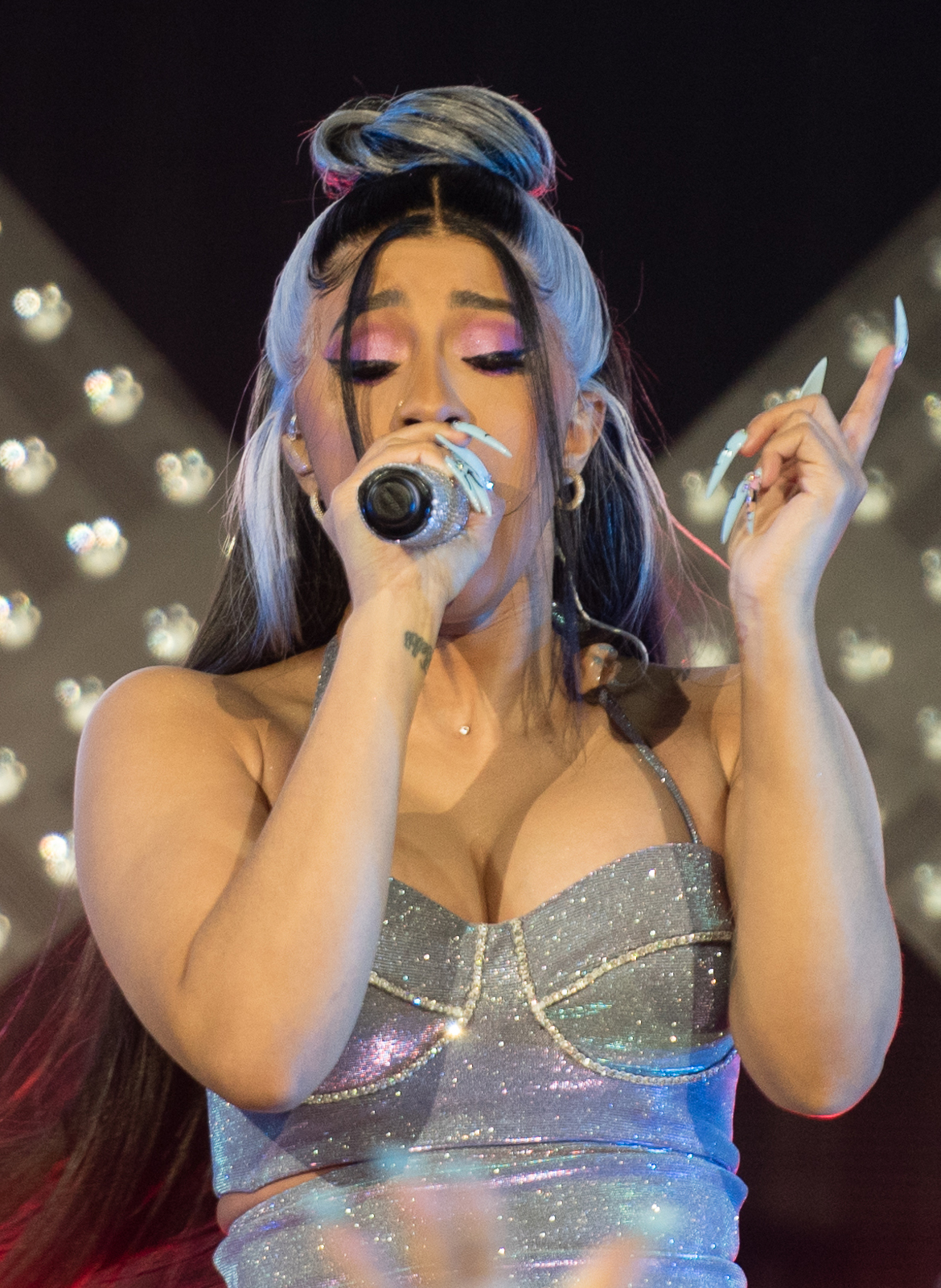
- Cardi B performing at the Openair Frauenfeld in 2019
- Studio albums: 2
- Singles: 51
- Music videos: 55
- Mixtapes: 3

American rapper Cardi B has released two studio albums and two mixtapes as a soloist, 51 singles (including 26 as a featured artist), and 55 music videos (including 25 as a featured artist). According to the Recording Industry Association of America (RIAA), she has sold 100 million equivalent units in the United States across albums, singles, and mixtapes, making her the 6th best-selling female digital artist in the country. Her debut album Invasion of Privacy was the best selling female rap album of the 2010s according to The Recording Academy. It also became the most streamed female rap album on Spotify history. According to the International Federation of the Phonographic Industry (IFPI), "Girls Like You" was the 5th best-selling single of 2018 worldwide, selling 11.9 million units that year alone.

In 2015, she embarked on a musical career, after amassing a large Internet fan base, following her appearances on VH1's Love & Hip Hop: New York. On March 7, 2016, Cardi B released her first full-length mixtape, Gangsta Bitch Music, Vol. 1 with KSR Group. On September 12, 2016, KSR Group released the compilation, Underestimated: The Album, which is a collaboration between KSR Group artists Cardi B, Hood Celebrity, SwiftOnDemand, Cashflow Harlem and Josh X. It was previously released only to attendees of their US tour. On January 20, 2017, Cardi B released her second full-length mixtape as the second installment to her Gangsta Bitch Music series, which spawned the single "Bronx Season".

In February 2017, Cardi B signed her first solo major label recording contract with Atlantic Records. Cardi B's first single for Atlantic, titled "Bodak Yellow", proved to be a success, becoming a crossover hit single, when it reached number one on the US Billboard Hot 100 chart. On the Hot 100 chart dated October 1, 2017, Cardi B claimed the top spot becoming the first female rapper to do so with a solo song since Lauryn Hill in 1998. On April 6, 2018, Cardi B released her debut studio album Invasion of Privacy, which topped the US Billboard 200, received a triple platinum certification by the RIAA, and became the longest-charting album by a female rapper. She became the first female artist to have all tracks from an album certified gold or higher by the RIAA, and the first artist overall to have all the tracks certified platinum or higher. Her single "I Like It", with Bad Bunny and J Balvin, made her the first female rapper with multiple number one songs on the Hot 100, and her collaboration with Maroon 5, "Girls Like You", extended the record, also making her the female rapper with most cumulative weeks at number one. "Bodak Yellow" made Cardi B the first female rapper to have a song certified Diamond by the RIAA, a record which she has since extended to three Diamond-certified songs. Debuting in 2017, she was Billboard's 35th Artist of the 2010s. "WAP", which was later included her second album, became her fourth chart-topper and made her the first female rapper to achieve Hot 100 number one singles in two different decades (2010s and 2020s). "Up", her fifth number one single on the Hot 100, made her the only female rapper to top the chart with multiple solo songs.

== Studio albums ==
List of studio albums, with selected chart positions and certifications
| Title | Album details | Peak chart positions | | | | | | | | | | Certifications |
| Title | Album details | US | US R&B/ HH | US Rap | AUS | CAN | DEN | IRE | NZ | SWE | UK | Certifications |
|---|---|---|---|---|---|---|---|---|---|---|---|---|
| Invasion of Privacy | Released: April 6, 2018; Label: Atlantic; Formats: CD, LP, digital download, streaming | 1 | 1 | 1 | 5 | 1 | 6 | 2 | 2 | 7 | 5 | RIAA: 6× Platinum; ARIA: 2× Platinum; BPI: Platinum; IFPI DEN: Platinum; MC: 4× Platinum; RMNZ: 3× Platinum |
| Am I the Drama? | Released: September 19, 2025; Label: Atlantic; Formats: CD, LP, digital download, streaming | 1 | 1 | 1 | 8 | 6 | — | 68 | 19 | — | 26 | RIAA: 3× Platinum; MC: 3× Platinum |
"—" denotes a title that did not chart, or was not released in that territory.

== Mixtapes ==
List of mixtapes, with year released and selected chart positions
| Title | Album details | Peak chart positions | | |
| Title | Album details | US Ind. | US R&B/ HH | US Rap |
|---|---|---|---|---|
| Gangsta Bitch Music, Vol. 1 | Released: March 7, 2016; Label: KSR; Format: Digital download | 27 | 30 | 20 |
| Underestimated: The Album (with The KSR Group) | Released: September 15, 2016; Label: KSR; Format: Digital download | — | — | — |
| Gangsta Bitch Music, Vol. 2 | Released: January 20, 2017; Label: KSR; Format: Digital download | 25 | — | — |
"—" denotes a title that did not chart, or was not released in that territory.

== Singles ==
=== As lead artist ===
List of singles as lead artist, with selected chart positions, showing year released and album name
| Title | Year | Peak chart positions | | | | | | | | | | Certifications | Album |
| Title | Year | US | US R&B/ HH | US Rap | AUS | CAN | FRA | IRE | NZ | SWI | UK | Certifications | Album |
|---|---|---|---|---|---|---|---|---|---|---|---|---|---|
| "Bodak Yellow" | 2017 | 1 | 1 | 1 | 33 | 6 | 127 | 51 | 24 | 74 | 24 | RIAA: 13× Platinum; ARIA: 6× Platinum; BPI: Platinum; MC: 8× Platinum; RMNZ: 3× Platinum; SNEP: Platinum | Invasion of Privacy |
| "Bartier Cardi" (featuring 21 Savage) | 2017 | 14 | 7 | 6 | 77 | 18 | 191 | 51 | — (Note: "Bartier Cardi" did not enter the NZ Top 40 Singles Chart, but peaked at number one on the NZ Heatseeker Singles Chart.) | 79 | 40 | RIAA: 4× Platinum; ARIA: 2× Platinum; BPI: Silver; MC: 4× Platinum; RMNZ: Platinum | Invasion of Privacy |
| "Be Careful" | 2018 | 11 | 8 | 6 | 65 | 24 | 154 | 25 | 39 | — | 24 | RIAA: 5× Platinum; ARIA: 2× Platinum; BPI: Platinum; MC: 3× Platinum; RMNZ: 2× Platinum | Invasion of Privacy |
| "I Like It" (with Bad Bunny and J Balvin) | 2018 | 1 | 1 | 1 | 14 | 2 | 19 | 10 | 7 | 8 | 8 | RIAA: 11× Platinum; ARIA: 8× Platinum; BPI: 3× Platinum; IFPI SWI: 2× Platinum; MC: Diamond; RMNZ: 5× Platinum; SNEP: Diamond | Invasion of Privacy |
| "Ring" (featuring Kehlani) | 2018 | 28 | 17 | 14 | — | 61 | — | — | — (Note: "Ring" did not enter the NZ Top 40 Singles Chart, but peaked at number four on the NZ Heatseeker Singles Chart.) | — | — | RIAA: 4× Platinum; BPI: Silver; MC: 2× Platinum; RMNZ: 2× Platinum | Invasion of Privacy |
| "Money" | 2018 | 13 | 6 | 6 | 65 | 30 | — | 14 | 36 | — | 35 | RIAA: 5× Platinum; ARIA: 3× Platinum; BPI: Platinum; MC: 5× Platinum; RMNZ: 2× Platinum; SNEP: Gold | Am I the Drama? (Note: The songs were later included on a digital reissue of Am I the Drama?.) |
| "Please Me" (with Bruno Mars) | 2019 | 3 | 1 | 1 | 22 | 12 | 116 | 21 | 12 | 57 | 12 | RIAA: 3× Platinum; ARIA: 3× Platinum; BPI: Platinum; MC: 3× Platinum; RMNZ: 2× Platinum; SNEP: Gold | Am I the Drama? |
| "Press" | 2019 | 16 | 6 | 5 | 65 | 37 | 158 | 38 | — (Note: "Press" did not enter the NZ Top 40 Singles Chart, but peaked at number six on the NZ Hot Singles Chart.) | 97 | 44 | RIAA: 2× Platinum; ARIA: Platinum; MC: Platinum | Am I the Drama? |
| "Yes" (with Fat Joe and Anuel AA) | 2019 | — (Note: "Yes" did not enter the Billboard Hot 100, but peaked at number 15 on the Bubbling Under Hot 100 chart.) | — (Note: "Yes" did not enter the Hot R&B/Hip-Hop Songs chart, but peaked at number 2 on the Bubbling Under R&B/Hip-Hop Singles chart.) | — (Note: "Yes" did not enter the Hot Rap Songs chart, but peaked at number 5 on the Rap Digital Song Sales chart.) | — | — | — | — | — | — | — | RIAA: Gold | Family Ties |
| "WAP" (featuring Megan Thee Stallion) | 2020 | 1 | 1 | 1 | 1 | 1 | 30 | 1 | 1 | 5 | 1 | RIAA: Diamond; ARIA: 10× Platinum; BPI: 2× Platinum; MC: 9× Platinum; RMNZ: 5× Platinum; SNEP: Diamond | Am I the Drama? |
| "Up" | 2021 | 1 | 1 | 1 | 11 | 7 | 169 | 10 | 14 | 47 | 16 | RIAA: 5× Platinum; ARIA: 4× Platinum; BPI: Platinum; MC: 5× Platinum; RMNZ: 2× Platinum; SNEP: Gold | Am I the Drama? |
| "Hot Shit" (featuring Kanye West and Lil Durk) | 2022 | 13 | 7 | 5 | 39 | 28 | — | 60 | — (Note: "Hot Shit" did not enter the NZ Top 40 Singles Chart, but peaked at number two on the NZ Hot Singles Chart.) | — | 59 | | Non-album single |
| "Tomorrow 2" (with GloRilla) | 2022 | 9 | 3 | 2 | — | 78 | — | — | — (Note: "Tomorrow 2" did not enter the NZ Top 40 Singles Chart, but peaked at number 22 on the NZ Hot Singles Chart.) | — | — | RIAA: 4× Platinum; MC: Gold; RMNZ: Gold | Anyways, Life's Great |
| "Point Me 2" (with FendiDa Rappa) | 2023 | 82 | 20 | 14 | — | — | — | — | — | — | — | RIAA: Gold | Non-album single |
| "Bongos" (featuring Megan Thee Stallion) | 2023 | 14 | 4 | 3 | 78 | 43 | — | 64 | — (Note: "Bongos" did not enter the NZ Top 40 Singles Chart, but peaked at number six on the NZ Hot Singles Chart.) | — | 35 | MC: Platinum | Am I the Drama? |
| "Enough (Miami)" | 2024 | 9 | 3 | 3 | — | 75 | — | — | — (Note: "Enough (Miami)" did not enter the NZ Top 40 Singles Chart, but peaked at number nine on the NZ Hot Singles Chart.) | — | 85 | MC: Gold | Am I the Drama? |
| "Puntería" (with Shakira) | 2024 | 72 | — | — | — | — | — | — | — (Note: "Puntería" did not enter the NZ Top 40 Singles Chart, but peaked at number 34 on the NZ Hot Singles Chart.) | 62 | — (Note: "Puntería" did not enter the UK Singles Chart but debuted and peaked at number 76 on the UK Singles Downloads Chart.) | RIAA: 3× Platinum (Latin) | Las Mujeres Ya No Lloran |
| "Toot It Up" (with Pardison Fontaine) | 2025 | — | — | — | — | — | — | — | — | — | — | | Non-album single |
| "Outside" | 2025 | 10 | 2 | 2 | — | 61 | — | — | — (Note: "Outside" did not enter the NZ Top 40 Singles Chart, but peaked at number 12 on the NZ Hot Singles Chart.) | — | 72 | MC: Gold | Am I the Drama? |
| "Imaginary Playerz" | 2025 | 66 | 14 | 7 | — | — | — | — | — (Note: "Imaginary Playerz" did not enter the NZ Top 40 Singles Chart, but peaked at number 30 on the NZ Hot Singles Chart.) | — | — | | Am I the Drama? |
| "Safe" (featuring Kehlani) | 2025 | 26 | 3 | 1 | — | 93 | — | — | — (Note: "Safe" did not enter the NZ Top 40 Singles Chart, but peaked at number 5 on the NZ Hot Singles Chart.) | — | 98 | | Am I the Drama? |
| "ErrTime" | 2025 | 43 | 8 | 4 | — | — | — | — | — | — | — | | Am I the Drama? |
| "Ah Ha" | 2026 | 25 | 5 | 3 | — | — | — | — | — (Note: "Ah Ha" did not enter the NZ Top 40 Singles Chart, but peaked at number 9 on the NZ Hot Singles Chart.) | — | — (Note: "Ah Ha" did not enter the UK Singles Chart, but debuted at number 42 on the UK Singles Sales Chart.) | | Non-album single |
"—" denotes a title that did not chart, or was not released in that territory.

=== As featured artist ===
List of singles as featured artist, with selected chart positions, showing year released and album name
| Title | Year | Peak chart positions | | | | | | | | | | Certifications | Album |
| Title | Year | US | US R&B/ HH | US Latin | AUS | CAN | FRA | IRE | NZ | SWI | UK | Certifications | Album |
|---|---|---|---|---|---|---|---|---|---|---|---|---|---|
| "Gimme Head Too" (J.R. featuring Cardi B) | 2016 | — | — | — | — | — | — | — | — | — | — | | In Due Time |
| "Want My Love Back" (Cashflow Harlem featuring Cardi B and Ryan Dudley) | 2016 | — | — | — | — | — | — | — | — | — | — | | Rich Thoughts Poor Habits |
| "Island Girls" (Hood Celebrityy featuring Cardi B, Josh X, and Young Chow) | 2016 | — | — | — | — | — | — | — | — | — | — | | Underestimated: The Album |
| "Heaven on My Mind" (Josh X featuring Cardi B) | 2016 | — | — | — | — | — | — | — | — | — | — | | Underestimated: The Album |
| "Right Now" (Phresher featuring Cardi B) | 2017 | — | — | — | — | — | — | — | — | — | — | | Non-album single |
| "No Limit" (G-Eazy featuring A$AP Rocky and Cardi B) | 2017 | 4 | 2 | — | 43 | 7 | 123 | 61 | 21 | 54 | 45 | RIAA: 8× Platinum; ARIA: Platinum; BPI: Gold; MC: 4× Platinum; RMNZ: 3× Platinum | The Beautiful & Damned |
| "MotorSport" (Migos featuring Nicki Minaj and Cardi B) | 2017 | 6 | 3 | — | 74 | 12 | 123 | 79 | — (Note: "MotorSport" did not enter the NZ Top 40 Singles Chart, but peaked at number two on the NZ Heatseekers Singles Chart.) | 54 | 49 | RIAA: 6× Platinum; ARIA: Platinum; BPI: Platinum; MC: 3× Platinum; RMNZ: Platinum; SNEP: Gold | Culture II |
| "La Modelo" (Ozuna featuring Cardi B) | 2017 | 52 | — | 3 | — | 84 | — | — | — | — | — | | Aura |
| "Finesse (Remix)" (Bruno Mars featuring Cardi B) (Note: According to Atlantic Records, Spotify and iTunes Store, Cardi B is a featured artist, not a lead artist. But Billboard, UK Singles Chart and RIAA identified the song as a collaboration.) | 2018 | 3 | 1 | — | 6 | 3 | 48 | 5 | 2 | 29 | 5 | RIAA: 5× Platinum; ARIA: 3× Platinum; BPI: 2× Platinum; IFPI SWI: Gold; RMNZ: Platinum; SNEP: Platinum | 24K Magic (Note: "Finesse (Remix)" appears on the Japanese deluxe edition of 24K Magic.) |
| "Girls" (Rita Ora featuring Cardi B, Bebe Rexha, and Charli XCX) | 2018 | — (Note: "Girls" did not enter the Billboard Hot 100, but peaked at number three on the Bubbling Under Hot 100 Singles chart.) | — | — | 52 | 72 | 138 | 26 | — (Note: "Girls" did not enter the NZ Top 40 Singles Chart, but peaked at number one on the NZ Heatseeker Singles Chart.) | 54 | 22 | ARIA: Gold; BPI: Gold; RMNZ: Gold | Phoenix |
| "Dinero" (Jennifer Lopez featuring DJ Khaled and Cardi B) | 2018 | 80 | — | — | — | 75 | 140 | — | — | — | — | RIAA: Gold | Non-album single |
| "Girls Like You" (Maroon 5 featuring Cardi B) | 2018 | 1 | — | — | 2 | 1 | 7 | 5 | 1 | 4 | 7 | RIAA: Diamond; ARIA: 13× Platinum; BPI: 3× Platinum; MC: 9× Platinum; RMNZ: 7× Platinum; SNEP: Diamond | Red Pill Blues |
| "Who Want the Smoke?" (Lil Yachty featuring Cardi B and Offset) | 2018 | — (Note: "Who Want the Smoke?" did not enter the Billboard Hot 100, but peaked at number 9 on the Bubbling Under Hot 100 Singles chart.) | — (Note: "Who Want the Smoke?" did not enter the Hot R&B/Hip-Hop Songs chart, but peaked at number 5 on the Bubbling Under R&B/Hip-Hop Singles chart.) | — | — | — | — | — | — | — | — | RIAA: Gold | Nuthin' 2 Prove |
| "Backin' It Up" (Pardison Fontaine featuring Cardi B) | 2018 | 40 | 18 | — | — | — | — | — | — (Note: "Backin' It Up" did not enter the NZ Top 40 Singles Chart, but peaked at number 36 on the NZ Hot Singles Chart.) | — | — | RIAA: Platinum; RMNZ: Platinum | UNDER8ED |
| "Taki Taki" (DJ Snake featuring Ozuna, Cardi B, and Selena Gomez) | 2018 | 11 | — | 1 | 24 | 7 | 2 | 16 | 12 | 3 | 15 | RIAA: 4× Platinum; ARIA: 3× Platinum; BPI: Platinum; MC: 6× Platinum; RMNZ: 2× Platinum; SNEP: Diamond | Carte Blanche |
| "Mi Mami" (El Alfa featuring Cardi B) | 2018 | — | — | 42 | — | — | — | — | — | — | — | | El Hombre |
| "Twerk" (City Girls featuring Cardi B) | 2019 | 29 | 14 | — | — | 70 | — | — | — (Note: "Twerk" did not enter the NZ Top 40 Singles Chart, but peaked at number 31 on the NZ Hot Singles Chart.) | — | — | RIAA: Platinum; RMNZ: Gold | Girl Code |
| "Clout" (Offset featuring Cardi B) | 2019 | 39 | 17 | — | — | 41 | — | 54 | — (Note: "Clout" did not enter the NZ Top 40 Singles Chart, but peaked at number 22 on the NZ Hot Singles Chart.) | — | 64 | RIAA: 3× Platinum; BPI: Silver; RMNZ: Platinum; SNEP: Gold | Father of 4 |
| "South of the Border" (Ed Sheeran featuring Camila Cabello and Cardi B) | 2019 | 49 | — | — | 12 | 14 | 75 | 6 | 14 | 14 | 4 | RIAA: Gold; ARIA: 4× Platinum; BPI: 2× Platinum; MC: 6× Platinum; RMNZ: 4× Platinum; SNEP: Platinum | No.6 Collaborations Project |
| "Writing on the Wall" (French Montana featuring Post Malone, Cardi B, and Rvssian) | 2019 | 56 | 33 | — | 43 | 18 | — | 42 | — (Note: "Writing on the Wall" did not enter the NZ Top 40 Singles Chart, but peaked at number four on the NZ Hot Singles Chart.) | 54 | 44 | RIAA: Gold; MC: Gold | Montana |
| "Me Gusta" (Anitta featuring Cardi B and Myke Towers) | 2020 | 91 | — | 5 | — | 92 | — | 63 | — (Note: "Me Gusta" did not enter the NZ Top 40 Singles Chart, but peaked at number 16 on the NZ Hot Singles Chart.) | 56 | — | | Versions of Me |
| "Wild Side" (Normani featuring Cardi B) | 2021 | 14 | 4 | — | — | 59 | — | 77 | — (Note: "Wild Side" did not enter the NZ Top 40 Singles Chart, but peaked at number six on the NZ Hot Singles Chart.) | — | 49 | RIAA: Gold; BPI: Silver; MC: Gold; RMNZ: Gold | Dopamine |
| "Rumors" (Lizzo featuring Cardi B) | 2021 | 4 | 1 | — | 16 | 12 | — | 16 | 23 | 85 | 20 | RIAA: Platinum; ARIA: Gold; BPI: Silver; MC: Platinum; RMNZ: Gold | Non-album single |
| "Shake It" (Kay Flock featuring Cardi B, Dougie B, and Bory300) | 2022 | 51 | 14 | — | — | 53 | — | — | — (Note: "Shake It" did not enter the NZ Top 40 Singles Chart, but peaked at number nine on the NZ Hot Singles Chart.) | — | — | RIAA: Platinum | The D.O.A. Tape |
| "Put It on da Floor Again" (Latto featuring Cardi B) | 2023 | 13 | 6 | — | — | — | — | — | — (Note: "Put It on da Floor Again" did not enter the NZ Top 40 Singles Chart, but peaked at number 36 on the NZ Hot Singles Chart.) | — | — | RIAA: 2× Platinum | Sugar Honey Iced Tea |
| "Jealousy" (Offset featuring Cardi B) (Note: According to Motown Records, Spotify, and Recorded Music NZ, Cardi B is a featured artist, not a lead artist. But Billboard, Apple Music, and YouTube identified the song as a collaboration.) | 2023 | 55 | 26 | — | — | — | — | — | — (Note: "Jealousy" did not enter the NZ Top 40 Singles Chart, but peaked at number 19 on the NZ Hot Singles Chart.) | — | — | | Set It Off |
| "On Dat Money" (Rob49 featuring Cardi B) | 2024 | — | 47 | — | — | — | — | — | — | — | — | | Let Me Fly |
"—" denotes a title that did not chart, or was not released in that territory.

=== Promotional singles ===
List of songs, with selected chart positions, showing year released and album name
| Title | Year | Peak chart positions | | | | | | | | | | Certifications | Album |
| Title | Year | US | US R&B/ HH | US Rap | AUS | CAN | FRA | IRE | NZ | SWI | UK | Certifications | Album |
|---|---|---|---|---|---|---|---|---|---|---|---|---|---|
| "Cheap Ass Weave" | 2015 | — | — | — | — | — | — | — | — | — | — | | Non-album singles |
| "Stripper Hoe" | 2016 | — | — | — | — | — | — | — | — | — | — | | Non-album singles |
| "What a Girl Likes" | 2016 | — | — | — | — | — | — | — | — | — | — | | Underestimated: The Album |
| "Foreva" | 2016 | — | — | — | — | — | — | — | — | — | — | | Gangsta Bitch Music, Vol. 1 |
| "Washpoppin" | 2016 | — | — | — | — | — | — | — | — | — | — | | Gangsta Bitch Music, Vol. 1 |
| "Bronx Season" | 2017 | — | — | — | — | — | — | — | — | — | — | | Underestimated: The Album and Gangsta Bitch Music, Vol. 2 |
| "Lick" (Remix) (featuring Offset) | 2017 | — (Note: "Lick (Remix)" did not enter the Billboard Hot 100, but peaked at number 17 on the Bubbling Under Hot 100 chart.) | — (Note: "Lick (Remix)" did not enter the Hot R&B/Hip-Hop Songs chart, but peaked at number 1 on the Bubbling Under R&B/Hip-Hop Singles chart.) | — | — | — | — | — | — | — | — | | Gangsta Bitch Music, Vol. 2 |
| "Pull Up" | 2017 | — | — | — | — | — | — | — | — | — | — | | Gangsta Bitch Music, Vol. 2 |
| "Drip" (featuring Migos) | 2018 | 21 | 15 | 11 | 60 | 31 | 187 | 72 | — (Note: "Drip" did not enter the NZ Top 40 Singles Chart, but peaked at number three on the NZ Heatseeker Singles Chart.) | 95 | 41 | RIAA: Platinum; ARIA: Platinum; MC: Platinum; RMNZ: Gold | Invasion of Privacy |
| "Like What (Freestyle)" | 2024 | 38 | 12 | 8 | — | 88 | — | — | — (Note: "Like What (Freestyle)" did not enter the NZ Top 40 Singles Chart, but peaked at number eight on the NZ Hot Singles Chart.) | — | — | | Am I the Drama? |
| "Higher Love" (Desi Trill featuring DJ Khaled, Cardi B, Natania, and Subhi) | 2025 | — | — | — | — | — | — | — | — | — | — | | Smurfs Movie Soundtrack (Music From & Inspired By) |
| "Don't Chart" | 2026 | — (Note: "Don't Chart" did not enter the Billboard Hot 100, but peaked at number two on the Bubbling Under Hot 100 chart.) | 24 | 15 | — | — | — | — | — (Note: "Don't Chart" did not enter the NZ Top 40 Singles Chart, but peaked at number 27 on the NZ Hot Singles Chart.) | — | — | | Grand Theft Auto VI: The Album |
"—" denotes a title that did not chart, or was not released in that territory.

== Other charted songs ==
List of songs, with selected chart positions, showing year released and album name
| Title | Year | Peak chart positions | | | | | | | | | | Certifications | Album |
| Title | Year | US | US R&B/ HH | US Rap | US Latin | AUS | CAN | IRE | NZ | UK | WW | Certifications | Album |
|---|---|---|---|---|---|---|---|---|---|---|---|---|---|
| "Ahora Dice (Real Hasta La Muerte Remix)" (Chris Jedi featuring Anuel AA, Cardi B, Offset, J Balvin, Ozuna, and Arcángel) | 2018 | — (Note: "Ahora Dice (Real Hasta La Muerte Remix)" did not enter the Billboard Hot 100, but peaked at number 4 on the Bubbling Under Hot 100 chart.) | — | — | 7 | — | — | — | — | — | — | | Non-album single |
| "I Do" (featuring SZA) | 2018 | 23 | 16 | 12 | — | — | 38 | 81 | — | — | — | RIAA: 2× Platinum; ARIA: Platinum; BPI: Silver; MC: 2× Platinum; RMNZ: Gold | Invasion of Privacy |
| "Get Up 10" | 2018 | 38 | 23 | 18 | — | — | 67 | — | — | — | — | RIAA: Platinum; MC: Gold | Invasion of Privacy |
| "Best Life" (featuring Chance the Rapper) | 2018 | 39 | 24 | 19 | — | — | 66 | — | — | — | — | RIAA: Platinum; MC: Gold | Invasion of Privacy |
| "Bickenhead" | 2018 | 43 | 25 | 20 | — | — | 76 | — | — | — | — | RIAA: Platinum; MC: Gold | Invasion of Privacy |
| "Thru Your Phone" | 2018 | 50 | 29 | 24 | — | — | 80 | — | — | — | — | RIAA: 3× Platinum; ARIA: Platinum; BPI: Gold; MC: 2× Platinum; RMNZ: Platinum | Invasion of Privacy |
| "She Bad" (with YG) | 2018 | 57 | 31 | — | — | — | 87 | — | — | — | — | RIAA: Platinum; MC: Gold | Invasion of Privacy |
| "Money Bag" | 2018 | 58 | 32 | — | — | — | 84 | — | — | — | — | RIAA: Platinum; MC: Gold | Invasion of Privacy |
| "Champagne Rosé" (Quavo featuring Madonna and Cardi B) | 2018 | — (Note: "Champagne Rosé" did not enter the Billboard Hot 100, but peaked at number 20 on the Bubbling Under Hot 100 Singles chart.) | — (Note: "Champagne Rosé" did not enter the Hot R&B/Hip-Hop Songs chart, but peaked at number 8 on the Bubbling Under R&B/Hip-Hop Singles chart.) | — | — | — | — | — | — | — | — | | Quavo Huncho |
| "On Me" (Meek Mill featuring Cardi B) | 2018 | 30 | 13 | 12 | — | — | 97 | — | — | — | — | RIAA: Gold | Championships |
| "Thotiana (Remix)" (Blueface featuring Cardi B and YG) | 2019 | — | — | — | — | — | — | — | 9 | — | — | RMNZ: 2× Platinum | Famous Cryp (Reloaded) |
| "Wish Wish" (DJ Khaled featuring Cardi B and 21 Savage) | 2019 | 19 | 8 | 6 | — | 88 | 28 | — | — (Note: "Wish Wish" did not enter the NZ Top 40 Singles Chart, but peaked at number 14 on the NZ Hot Singles Chart.) | 81 | — | RIAA: 2× Platinum; ARIA: Gold; MC: Gold | Father of Asahd |
| "Rodeo" (with Lil Nas X) | 2019 | 22 | 12 | 10 | — | 72 | 44 | 35 | — (Note: "Rodeo" did not enter the NZ Top 40 Singles Chart, but peaked at number 6 on the NZ Hot Singles Chart.) | 55 | — | RIAA: 3× Platinum; ARIA: Gold; BPI: Silver; MC: 2× Platinum; RMNZ: Gold | 7 |
| "La Bebe (Remix)" (with Anuel AA, Black Jonas Point, Secreto, and Liro Shaq) | 2020 | — | — | — | — (Note: "La Bebe (Remix)" did not enter the Hot Latin Singles Chart, but peaked at number 21 on the Latin Digital Song Sales Chart.) | — | — | — | — | — | — | RIAA: Gold (Latin) | Non-album single |
| "Bet You Wanna" (Blackpink featuring Cardi B) | 2020 | — (Note: "Bet You Wanna" did not enter the Billboard Hot 100, but peaked at number 1 on the Bubbling Under Hot 100 chart.) | — | — | — | 42 | 58 | 43 | — (Note: "Bet You Wanna" did not enter the NZ Top 40 Singles Chart, but peaked at number 4 on the NZ Hot Singles Chart.) | 62 | 25 | | The Album |
| "Big Paper" (DJ Khaled featuring Cardi B) | 2021 | 84 | 37 | — | — | — | — | — | — | — | 156 | | Khaled Khaled |
| "Type Shit" (with Migos) | 2021 | 71 | 30 | — | — | — | — | — | — | — | 104 | | Culture III |
| "Bitter" (Note: Subtitled "(Narration by Cardi B)") (with Summer Walker) | 2021 | 25 | 9 | — | — | — | 76 | — | — (Note: "Bitter" did not enter the NZ Top 40 Singles Chart, but peaked at number 20 on the NZ Hot Singles Chart.) | 48 | 36 | RIAA: Gold | Still Over It |
| "No Love (Extended)" (with Summer Walker and SZA) | 2022 | ― (Note: "No Love (Extended)" did not enter the Billboard Hot 100, but peaked at number 17 on the Digital Song Sales chart.) | ― (Note: "No Love (Extended)" did not enter the Hot R&B/Hip-Hop Songs chart, but peaked at number 6 on the R&B/Hip-Hop Digital Song Sales chart.) | ― | ― | — | ― | ― | ― | ― | ― | | Non-album singles |
| "Wanna Be (Remix)" (with GloRilla and Megan Thee Stallion) | 2024 | ― | — (Note: "Wanna Be (Remix)" did not enter the Hot R&B/Hip-Hop Songs chart, but peaked at number 2 on the R&B/Hip-Hop Airplay chart.) | ― (Note: "Wanna Be (Remix)" did not enter the Hot Rap Songs chart, but peaked at number 2 on the Rap Airplay chart.) | — | ― | ― | ― | — (Note: "Wanna Be (Remix)" did not enter the NZ Top 40 Singles Chart, but peaked at number 25 on the NZ Hot Singles Chart.) | ― | ― | | Non-album singles |
| "Put Em in the Fridge" (with Peso Pluma) | 2024 | — (Note: "Put Em in the Fridge" did not enter the Billboard Hot 100, but peaked at number 21 on the Bubbling Under Hot 100 chart.) | — | — | 17 | — | — | — | — | — | — | | Éxodo |
| "Dead" (featuring Summer Walker) | 2025 | 47 | 12 | 9 | — | — | — | — | — (Note: "Dead" did not enter the NZ Top 40 Singles Chart, but peaked at number 19 on the NZ Hot Singles Chart.) | — | — | | Am I the Drama? |
| "Hello" | 2025 | 46 | 11 | 8 | — | — | — | — | — | — | — | | Am I the Drama? |
| "Magnet" | 2025 | 37 | 8 | 4 | — | — | — | — | — | — | 170 | | Am I the Drama? |
| "Pick It Up" (featuring Selena Gomez) | 2025 | 45 | — | 7 | — | — | — | — | — (Note: "Pick It Up" did not enter the NZ Top 40 Singles Chart, but peaked at number 15 on the NZ Hot Singles Chart.) | — | 157 | | Am I the Drama? |
| "Bodega Baddie" | 2025 | 53 | — | 11 | — | — | — | — | — | — | — | | Am I the Drama? |
| "Salute" | 2025 | 73 | 20 | 16 | — | — | — | — | — | — | — | | Am I the Drama? |
| "Man of Your Word" (featuring Dougie F) | 2025 | 70 | 19 | 15 | — | — | — | — | — | — | — | | Am I the Drama? |
| "What's Goin On" (featuring Lizzo) | 2025 | 63 | 15 | 12 | — | — | — | — | — | — | — | | Am I the Drama? |
| "Shower Tears" (featuring Summer Walker) | 2025 | 81 | 22 | 18 | — | — | — | — | — | — | — | | Am I the Drama? |
| "Pretty & Petty" | 2025 | 43 | 10 | 6 | — | — | — | — | — (Note: "Pretty & Petty" did not enter the NZ Top 40 Singles Chart, but peaked at number 17 on the NZ Hot Singles Chart.) | — | 198 | | Am I the Drama? |
| "Better than You" (featuring Cash Cobain) | 2025 | 85 | 25 | 20 | — | — | — | — | — | — | — | | Am I the Drama? |
| "On My Back" (featuring Lourdiz) | 2025 | — (Note: "On My Back" did not enter the Billboard Hot 100, but peaked at number 1 on the Bubbling Under Hot 100 chart.) | 31 | — | — | — | — | — | — | — | — | | Am I the Drama? |
| "Check Please" | 2025 | — (Note: "Check Please" did not enter the Billboard Hot 100, but peaked at number 3 on the Bubbling Under Hot 100 chart.) | 31 | — | — | — | — | — | — | — | — | | Am I the Drama? |
| "Principal" (featuring Janet Jackson) | 2025 | 92 | 26 | 21 | — | — | — | — | — | — | — | | Am I the Drama? |
| "Trophies" | 2025 | — (Note: "Trophies" did not enter the Billboard Hot 100, but peaked at number 4 on the Bubbling Under Hot 100 chart.) | 35 | — | — | — | — | — | — | — | — | | Am I the Drama? |
| "Nice Guy" (featuring Tyla) | 2025 | — (Note: "Nice Guy" did not enter the Billboard Hot 100, but peaked at number 8 on the Bubbling Under Hot 100 chart.) | 38 | — | — | — | — | — | — | — | — | | Am I the Drama? |
| "Killin You Hoes" | 2025 | — (Note: "Killin You Hoes" did not enter the Billboard Hot 100, but peaked at number 7 on the Bubbling Under Hot 100 chart.) | 37 | — | — | — | — | — | — | — | — | | Am I the Drama? |
| "On the News" (Young Thug featuring Cardi B) | 2025 | — (Note: "On the News" did not enter the Billboard Hot 100, but peaked at number 23 on the Bubbling Under Hot 100 chart.) | 38 | — | — | — | — | — | — | — | — | | UY Scuti |
"—" denotes a title that did not chart, or was not released in that territory.

== Guest appearances ==
List of non-single guest appearances, with other performing artists, showing year released and album name
| Title | Year | Other artist(s) | Album |
|---|---|---|---|
| "Boom Boom (Remix)" | 2015 | Shaggy, Popcaan | —N/a |
| "Know the Difference" | 2015 | N.O. Corleone | —N/a |
| "Fuck Me Up" | 2016 | TJR | —N/a |
| "She a Bad One (BBA)" (Remix) | 2016 | Red Café | —N/a |
| "Look at Me" | 2017 | Popperazzi Po, Billionaire Black | —N/a |
| "Island Girls" | 2017 | HoodCelebrityy, Josh X and Young Chow | —N/a |
| "Cute (Remix)" | 2017 | DRAM | |
| "Kamasutra" | 2017 | Juicy J | Highly Intoxicated and Shutdafukup |
| "Um Yea" | 2017 | Offset | Quality Control: Control the Streets Volume 1 |
| "Coronavirus" | 2020 | iMarkkeyz | —N/a |
| "Intro / Cardi B Interlude" | 2020 | Rubi Rose | For the Streets |
| "Bet It" | 2021 | —N/a | Bruised: Soundtrack From and Inspired by the Netflix Film |
| "The Seaweed Sway" | 2022 | The Cast of Baby Shark's Big Show | Sing, Dance and Sway the Nick Jr. Way |
| "Despechá RMX" | 2022 | Rosalía | —N/a |
| "Freaky" | 2023 | Offset | Set It Off |
| "Never Lose Me (Remix)" | 2024 | Flo Milli, SZA | Fine Ho, Stay |
| "Pocket" | 2026 | Kehlani | Kehlani |

== Music videos ==
=== As lead artist ===
List of music videos as lead artist, showing year released and directors
| Title | Year | Director(s) |
|---|---|---|
| "Cheap Ass Weave" | 2015 | Renel Jolly |
| "Foreva" | 2016 | Picture Perfect |
| "Washpoppin" | 2016 | Picture Perfect |
| "Red Barz" | 2017 | Benji Filmz |
| "Lick" (Remix) (featuring Offset) | 2017 | Mazi O. |
| "Pull Up" | 2017 | Benji Filmz |
| "Bodak Yellow" | 2017 | Picture Perfect |
| "MotorSport" (with Migos and Nicki Minaj) | 2017 | Bradley & Pablo and Quavo |
| "Bartier Cardi" (featuring 21 Savage) | 2018 | Petra Collins |
| "Be Careful" | 2018 | Jora Frantzis |
| "I Like It" (with Bad Bunny and J Balvin) | 2018 | Eif Rivera |
| "Ring" (featuring Kehlani) | 2018 | Mike Ho |
| "Money" | 2018 | Jora Frantzis |
| "Please Me" (with Bruno Mars) | 2019 | Bruno Mars and Florent Dechard |
| "Press" | 2019 | Jora Frantzis and Cardi B |
| "Yes" (with Fat Joe and Anuel AA) | 2019 | Eif Rivera |
| "WAP" (featuring Megan Thee Stallion) | 2020 | Colin Tilley |
| "Up" | 2021 | Tanu Muino |
| "No Love (Extended)" (with Summer Walker and SZA) | 2022 | Lacey Duke |
| "Hot Shit" (featuring Kanye West and Lil Durk) | 2022 | Lado Kvataniya |
| "Tomorrow 2" (with GloRilla) | 2022 | Diesel Filmz |
| "Point Me 2" (with FendiDa Rappa) | 2023 | Michelle Parker |
| "Bongos" (featuring Megan Thee Stallion) | 2023 | Tanu Muino |
| "Like What (Freestyle)" | 2024 | Offset |
| "Enough (Miami)" | 2024 | Patience Harding |
| "Puntería" (with Shakira) | 2024 | Hannah Lux Davis |
| "Toot It Up" (with Pardison Fontaine) | 2025 | Jon J Visuals |
| "Imaginary Playerz" | 2025 | Cardi B and Patientce Foster |
| "Safe" (featuring Kehlani) | 2025 | Arrad |
| ''Ah ha'' | 2026 | *Unknown |

=== As featured artist ===
List of music videos as a featured artist, showing year released and directors
| Title | Year | Director(s) |
|---|---|---|
| "She a Bad One (BBA) [Remix]" (Red Café featuring Cardi B) | 2016 | Red Café |
| "Heaven on My Mind" (Josh X featuring Cardi B) | 2016 | Mazi O. |
| "Look At Me" (Popperazzi Po featuring Cardi B and Billionaire Black) | 2017 | Benji Filmz |
| "La Modelo" (Ozuna featuring Cardi B) | 2017 | Nuno Gomez |
| "No Limit (Remix)" (G-Eazy featuring A$AP Rocky, Cardi B, French Montana, Juicy J, and Belly) | 2017 | Daniel Cz |
| "Finesse (Remix)" (Bruno Mars featuring Cardi B) | 2018 | Bruno Mars and Florent Dechard |
| "Dinero" (Jennifer Lopez featuring Cardi B and DJ Khaled) | 2018 | Joseph Kahn |
| "Girls" (Rita Ora featuring Cardi B, Bebe Bexha, and Charli XCX) | 2018 | Helmi |
| "Girls Like You" (Original, Volume 2 and Vertical Video versions) (Maroon 5 featuring Cardi B) | 2018 | David Dobkin |
| "Backin' It Up" (Pardison Fontaine featuring Cardi B) | 2018 | Kid Art |
| "Taki Taki" (DJ Snake featuring Ozuna, Cardi B, and Selena Gomez) | 2018 | Colin Tilley |
| "Mi Mami" (El Alfa featuring Cardi B) | 2018 | Fernando Lugo |
| "Twerk" (City Girls featuring Cardi B) | 2019 | Daps and Sara Lacombe |
| "Thotiana (Remix)" (Blueface featuring Cardi B) | 2019 | Cole Bennett |
| "Clout" (Offset featuring Cardi B) | 2019 | Daniel Russel |
| "Wish Wish" (DJ Khaled featuring Cardi B and 21 Savage) | 2019 | Eif Rivera |
| "South of the Border" (Ed Sheeran featuring Camila Cabello and Cardi B) | 2019 | Jason Koenig |
| "Writing on the Wall" (French Montana featuring Post Malone, Cardi B, and Rvssian) | 2019 | Myles Whittingham and French Montana |
| "Me Gusta" (Anitta featuring Cardi B and Myke Towers) | 2020 | Daniel Russel |
| "Wild Side" (Normani featuring Cardi B) | 2021 | Tanu Muino |
| "Rumors" (Lizzo featuring Cardi B) | 2021 | Tanu Muino |
| "Shake It" (Kay Flock featuring Cardi B, Dougie B, and Bory300) | 2022 | |
| "Put It on da Floor" (Latto featuring Cardi B) | 2023 | HidjiWorld and Latto |
| "Jealousy" (Offset featuring Cardi B) | 2023 | Offset |
| "On Dat Money" (Rob49 featuring Cardi B) | 2024 | George Buford, Frederick Buford, and Directedbyfrankie |
