= Thru Your Phone =

2018 song by Cardi B

Song by Cardi B

from the album Invasion of Privacy
- Genre: R&B
- Length: 3:08
- Label: Atlantic
- Songwriters: Belcalis Almanzar; Benjamin Levin; Jordan Thorpe; Justin Tranter; Alexandra Tamposi; Andrew Wotman
- Producers: Andrew Watt; Benny Blanco

"Thru Your Phone" is a song recorded by American rapper Cardi B for her debut studio album Invasion of Privacy (2018). It was written by Cardi B, Jordan Thorpe, Justin Tranter, Alexandra Tamposi, and its producers Benny Blanco and Andrew Wotman, with additional production from Louis Bell. "Thru Your Phone" entered at number 50 on the US Billboard Hot 100 the week following the album's release. The song was certified triple platinum by the Recording Industry Association of America (RIAA).

== Composition ==
Lyrically, "Thru Your Phone" is about the protagonist finding explicit conversations on her partner's mobile phone and contemplates revenge on him. A Billboard article deemed the song "the rap equivalent of Jazmine Sullivan's "Bust Your Windows", while a Rolling Stone article noted it as one of the two "most emotionally hardcore" songs in the parent album—the other being "I Do"—that builds on the rage of "Be Careful", and compared it to a doo-wop ballad.

== Critical reception ==
Neil Z. Yeung of AllMusic deemed the track "unflinching and relatable," and considered the vengeance lines where the narrator poisons her cheating man with bleach in his cereal and "a good old-fashioned" stabbing, "cartoonish but real, a confession of thoughts that are all too familiar to the scorned." In NME, Nick Levine stated, "the way she flips from righteous fury to plaintive desperation on "Thru Your Phone", a track about her partner's infidelity, is thrilling and palpably emotional."

== Charts ==
2018 chart performance for "Thru Your Phone"
Chart (2018)	Peak position
Canada Hot 100 (Billboard)	80
US Billboard Hot 100	50
US Hot R&B/Hip-Hop Songs (Billboard)	29

2022 chart performance for "Thru Your Phone"
Chart (2022)	Peak position
Lithuania (AGATA)	1

== Certifications ==
Certifications for "Thru Your Phone"
Region	Certification	Certified units/sales
Australia (ARIA)	Platinum	70,000^{‡}
Canada (Music Canada)	2× Platinum	160,000^{‡}
New Zealand (RMNZ)	Platinum	30,000^{‡}
United Kingdom (BPI)	Gold	400,000^{‡}
United States (RIAA)	3× Platinum	3,000,000^{‡}
^{‡} Sales+streaming figures based on certification alone.
