= Bag of Money (disambiguation) =

"Bag of Money" is a song by American rapper Wale.

Bag of Money, Money bag, Money purse and similar terms may refer to:

- Money bag, a bag normally used to hold and transport coins and banknotes
- Moneybags (game show), a British television show broadcast on Channel 4 from 2021 to 2022
- "Money Bag" (song), a song by Cardi B
- Moneybagg Yo, an American rapper
- "Bag of Money", an episode of Hey Arnold!
- Moneybags, a recurring character in the Spyro series

== See also ==
- Prize money, also called purse money
