= Nija Charles =

American songwriter and record producer (born 1997)

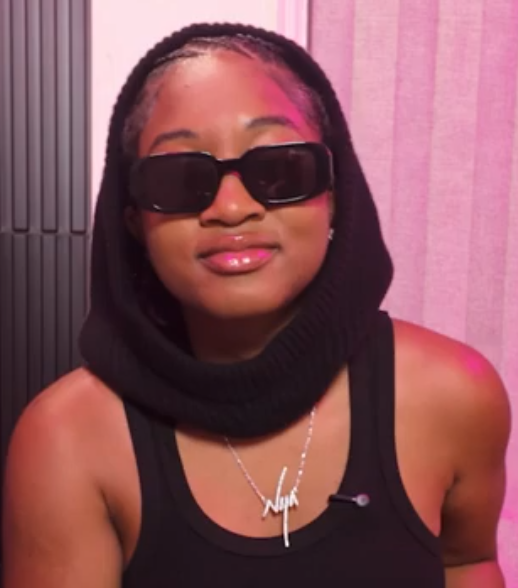
- Charles in 2025

Background information
- Also known as: Amnija; Nija
- Born: Nija Aisha-Alayja Charles; October 20, 1997 (age 28); Union, New Jersey, U.S.
- Genres: R&B; pop rap; pop
- Occupations: Singer; songwriter; record producer
- Years active: 2017–present
- Label: Capitol
- Publisher: Universal Music Publishing Group

Nija Aisha-Alayja Charles (born October 20, 1997), also known by her stage name Amnija, is an American singer, songwriter, and record producer. Charles began her career in 2017, and has since written songs for The Carters ("Heard About Us" and "LoveHappy"), Lady Gaga ("Rain on Me"), Cardi B ("I Do" and "Ring"), and Chris Brown ("No Guidance"). She is signed to Capitol Records and Universal Music Publishing Group.

She was nominated for the inaugural Grammy Award for Songwriter of the Year at the 65th Annual Grammy Awards for her work on releases by Beyoncé, Summer Walker, City Girls, Lil Durk, Anitta, Meek Mill, Megan Thee Stallion and Kehlani.

== Biography ==
Charles gained interest in music as a child, observing her uncle and aunt experiment on the production software Fruity Loops. Raised in Union, New Jersey, Charles graduated in 2015 from Union High School.

In 2016, she enrolled in the Clive Davis Institute of Recorded Music at New York University where she practiced her production and songwriting skills. During the second semester of her sophomore year, Charles met her current manager, Christian McCurdy. He introduced her to RCA Records A&R J Grand, and he flew her to Los Angeles to work with producers and other artists and repertoires in the recording industry. Charles continued traveling between Los Angeles and New York City for short bi-weekly trips, allowing her to work on music in Los Angeles while still attending classes in New York City. Charles left Clive Davis Institute of Recorded Music in 2017 after signing a publishing deal with Universal Music Publishing Group.

As a songwriter and producer, Charles' songwriting credits include Beyoncé, Jay-Z, Chris Brown, Cardi B, SZA, Kehlani, Lady Gaga, Ariana Grande, and Jason Derulo. Charles was placed on BET's 2020 "Future 40" list, which is a list of "40 of the most inspiring and innovative vanguards who are redefining what it means to be unapologetically young, gifted & black". She was named to Rolling Stone's "Future 25" in October 2020.

== Artistry ==
=== Influences ===
Charles has described growing up listening to R&B all around her. She claims The-Dream, Usher, Ryan Leslie, Chris Brown, Amerie, NSYNC, Britney Spears, Beyoncé, and Paramore as influences, describing herself as "a melting pot of everyone that I've ever listened to." In reference to her 2022 EP Don't Say I Didn't Warn You, Charles cited Pop Smoke as a direct influence.

=== Songwriting ===
Charles has described her songwriting process as empathetic, stating that "When I write for other people I have to kind of imagine how I would sing a song if I were them or tailor it to how they would sing it." She has drawn comparisons between acting and collaborative songwriting, describing how writing with other artists requires her to "dig deep" and "imagine how you would feel if you were in this scenario." Charles maintains a solo career alongside her songwriting, and has urged listeners to "keep in mind [...] that I am not the other records that you've heard me pen on, they were meant for other people." Her solo songs, by contrast, are "not tailored to anyone but me as my experiences".

=== Production ===
Charles calls production her "first love," having started producing at age 13. Her style varies depending on her mood, and she credits trial and error as an important part of the development of her production tastes. She finds production to be more difficult than songwriting, saying that "Writing for me is effortless, but with production I tend to overthink sometimes."

=== Solo work ===
Charles' 2022 EP Don't Say I Didn't Warn You grew out of Charles' desire to experiment with the New York drill scene, combining it with R&B: "I wanted to hear an actual singing song on top of a drill beat, so that was one of the inspirations." She views the album as the result of combining rap, pop, and R&B she was listening to at the time. Charles also described wanting to bring themes of female empowerment from rap into an R&B space, saying that she "always want[s] to come from a position of power" in her music.

== Discography ==
=== Extended plays ===
- Don't Say I Didn't Warn You (2022)

== Songwriting discography ==
| Year | Artist(s) | Song | Album | Ref. | |
|---|---|---|---|---|---|
| 2017 | Kid Ink | "F with U (featuring Ty Dolla $ign)" | 7 Series (EP) | | |
| 2017 | Lecrae | "Lucked Up (featuring Nija)" | All Things Work Together | | |
| 2017 | Chris Brown | "Pull Up" | Heartbreak on a Full Moon | | |
| 2017 | Flo Rida | "Hola (featuring Maluma)" | FR5* | | |
| 2017 | Lyrica Anderson | "Don't Take It Personal" | Adia | | |
| 2017 | Lyrica Anderson | "Mind Fucked" | Adia | | |
| 2017 | Lyrica Anderson | "Late Night" | Adia | | |
| 2017 | Daniel Skye | "Stuck On You (featuring PnB Rock)" | - | | |
| 2018 | Jason Derulo | "Colors (The Official 2018 Coca-Cola Fifa World Cup Song)" | - | | |
| 2018 | Cardi B | "Ring (featuring Kehlani)" | Invasion of Privacy | | |
| 2018 | Cardi B | "I Do (featuring SZA)" | Invasion of Privacy | | |
| 2018 | Tone Stith | "Light Flex (featuring 2 Chainz)" | Uncle Drew (Original Motion Picture Soundtrack) | | |
| 2018 | The Carters | "Heard About Us" | Everything Is Love | | |
| 2018 | The Carters | "LoveHappy" | Everything Is Love | | |
| 2018 | Christian Lalama | "Tic Toc" | - | | |
| 2018 | Kid Ink | "Cana (featuring 24 Hrs)" | - | | |
| 2018 | Bia | "Blue Bank" | Nice Girls Finish Last: Cuidado - EP | | |
| 2018 | Bia | "Vibes On Me (featuring Kodak Black)" | Nice Girls Finish Last: Cuidado - EP | | |
| 2018 | Bia | "Drown In My Cup" | Nice Girls Finish Last: Cuidado - EP | | |
| 2018 | Kodie Shane | "Hiatus" | Young aa | | |
| 2018 | Meek Mill | "Uptown Vibes (featuring Fabolous & Anuel AA)" | Championships | | |
| 2018 | Meek Mill | "On Me (featuring Cardi B)" | Championships | | |
| 2018 | Meek Mill | "24/7 (featuring Ella Mai)" | Championships | | |
| 2018 | 21 Savage | "A&T (featuring City Girls)" | I Am > I Was | | |
| 2019 | Sean Paul | "Shot & Wine (featuring Stefflon Don)" | - | | |
| 2019 | Eric Bellinger | "Type A Way (featuring Chris Brown & OG Parker)" | The Rebirth 2 | | |
| 2019 | ELHAE | "Sanctuary (featuring Big Krit) | Trouble In Paradise | | |
| 2019 | Loren Gray | "Options" | - | | |
| 2019 | PnB Rock | "How It Feels" | TrapStar Turnt PopStar | | |
| 2019 | DJ Khaled | "Celebrate (featuring Travis Scott & Post Malone)" | Father of Asahd | | |
| 2019 | Anitta with Major Lazer | "Make It Hot" | Music Is the Weapon | | |
| 2019 | Chris Brown | "No Guidance (featuring Drake)" | Indigo | | |
| 2019 | Chris Brown | "Emerald/Burgundy (featuring Juvenile & Juicy J)" | Indigo | | |
| 2019 | Chris Brown | "Early 2k (featuring Tank)" | Indigo | | |
| 2019 | Mustard | "Surface (featuring Ella Mai & Ty Dolla Sign)" | Perfect Ten | | |
| 2019 | Beyoncé | "Water (featuring Salatiel & Pharrell)" | The Lion King: The Gift | | |
| 2019 | Beyoncé | "My Power (featuring Nija, Tierra Whack, Busiswa & Moonchild Sanelly)" | The Lion King: The Gift | | |
| 2019 | Summer Walker | "Come Thru (featuring Usher)" | Over It | | |
| 2019 | Summer Walker | "Potential" | Over It | | |
| 2019 | Summer Walker | "Tonight" | Over It | | |
| 2019 | Summer Walker | "Like It (featuring 6lack)" | Over It | | |
| 2019 | Summer Walker | "Something Real (featuring Chris Brown & London on da Track)" | TBA | | |
| 2019 | Jacquees | "Out The Ordinary" | King of R&B | | |
| 2019 | Jacquees | "New New" | King of R&B | | |
| 2019 | Jason Derulo | "Be the One" | 2Sides (Side 1) | | |
| 2019 | Davido | "D&G (featuring Summer Walker)" | A Good Time | | |
| 2020 | Sean Paul | "Calling on Me (featuring Tove Lo)" | TBA | | |
| 2020 | A Boogie wit da Hoodie | "Calm Down (Bittersweet)" (featuring Summer Walker) | Artist 2.0 | | |
| 2020 | Megan Thee Stallion | "Hit My Phone (featuring Kehlani)" | Suga | | |
| 2020 | Dvsn | "Keep It Going" | A Muse In Her Feelings | | |
| 2020 | Trey Songz | "Back Home (featuring Summer Walker)" | Back Home | | |
| 2020 | Kehlani | "F&MU" | It Was Good Until It Wasn't | | |
| 2020 | Kehlani | "Can You Blame Me (featuring Lucky Daye)" | It Was Good Until It Wasn't | | |
| 2020 | Kehlani | "Open (Passionate)" | It Was Good Until It Wasn't | | |
| 2020 | Chris Brown & Young Thug | "She Bumped Her Head (featuring Gunna)" | Slime & B | | |
| 2020 | Chris Brown & Young Thug | "Big Slimes (featuring Gunna & Lil Duke)" | Slime & B | | |
| 2020 | Chris Brown & Young Thug | "I Ain't Tryin" | Slime & B | | |
| 2020 | Lady Gaga & Ariana Grande | "Rain on Me" | Chromatica | | |
| 2020 | Teyana Taylor | "69" | The Album | | |
| 2020 | Teyana Taylor | "Bare Wit Me" | The Album | | |
| 2020 | Teyana Taylor | "Try Again" | The Album | | |
| 2020 | Chloe x Halle | "Intro" | Ungodly Hour | | |
| 2020 | Chloe x Halle | "Forgive Me" | Ungodly Hour | | |
| 2020 | H.E.R. | "Do To Me" | TBA | | |
| 2020 | Maroon 5 | "Nobody's Love" | Jordi | | |
| 2020 | Ariana Grande | "Motive (with Doja Cat)" | Positions | | |
| 2020 | Ariana Grande | "Positions" | Positions | | |
| 2020 | Ariana Grande | "Obvious" | Positions | | |
| 2020 | Ty Dolla $ign | "Time Will Tell" | Featuring Ty Dolla $ign | | |
| 2020 | Wizkid | "Piece of Me (featuring Ella Mai)" | Made In Lagos | | |
| 2020 | Mulatto | "Sex Lies (featuring Lil Baby)" | Queen of Da Souf | | |
| 2021 | ZAYN | "Vibez" | Nobody Is Listening | | |
| 2021 | Paloma Mami | "RDMDA" | Sueños de Dalí | | |
| 2021 | Young Thug | "No Surprise (featuring Don Toliver & B Slime)" | Slime Language 2 | | |
| 2021 | DJ Khaled | "We Going Crazy (featuring H.E.R. & Migos)" | Khaled Khaled | | |
| 2021 | Zhavia Whard | "Big Girl$ Don't Cry" | TBA | | |
| 2021 | Mabel | "Take It Home" | Pokémon 25: The Album | | |
| 2021 | Kiana Ledé | "Ur Best Friend (featuring Kehlani)" | TBA | | |
| 2021 | Jackson Wang | "Drive You Home with Internet Money" | TBA | | |
| 2021 | Chlöe | "Have Mercy" | TBA | | |
| 2021 | Summer Walker | "Ex for a Reason (with JT from City Girls)" | Still Over It | | |
| 2021 | Summer Walker | "Throw It Away" | Still Over It | | |
| 2021 | Melody | "Assalto Perigoso" | | | |
| 2022 | Megan Thee Stallion | "Sweetest Pie (featuring Dua Lipa)" | Traumazine | | |
| 2022 | Kehlani | "Tangerine" | Blue Water Road | | |
| 2022 | Lil Durk | "IYKYK (featuring Ella Mai & A Boogie wit da Hoodie)" | 7220 | | |
| 2022 | City Girls | "Good Love (featuring Usher)" | TBA | | |
| 2022 | Beyoncé | "Cozy" | Renaissance | | |
| 2022 | Calvin Harris | "Ready or Not (featuring Busta Rhymes) | Funk Wav Bounces Vol. 2 | | |
| 2023 | Shenseea | "Call Now" | — | songwriter | |
| 2023 | Shenseea | "Running Away" | — | songwriter | |
| 2024 | Usher | "Good Good" | Coming Home | — | songwriter |
| 2024 | Sexyy Red | "I Might" | — | songwriter | |
| 2024 | Coco Jones | "Most Beautiful Design" | — | songwriter | |
| 2024 | Toosii featuring Muni Long | "I Do" | — | songwriter | |
| 2024 | Megan Thee Stallion featuring TWICE | "Mamushi (Remix)" | | | |
| 2024 | Shenseea | "Dolla" | — | songwriter | |
| 2024 | Shenseea | "Keep a Place" | — | songwriter | |
| 2025 | Lisa | "Fxck Up the World" (featuring Future) | Alter Ego | songwriter | |
| 2025 | Lil Nas X | "Light Again" | — | songwriter | |
| 2025 | J-Hope | "Mona Lisa" | — | songwriter | |
| 2025 | Saweetie | "I Need Some Inspo" | — | songwriter | |
| 2025 | Cardi B | "Shower Tears" | — | songwriter | |
| 2025 | Honey Dijon featuring Chlöe | "The Nightlife" | — | songwriter | |
| 2025 | Summer Walker and Mariah the Scientist | "Robbed You" | — | songwriter | |
| 2025 | Kiana Ledé and Chlöe | "Weakness" | — | songwriter | |
| 2026 | Jordan Adetunji | "Who Is It" | — | songwriter | |
| 2026 | John Summit | "Mess With Me" | — | songwriter | |
| 2026 | Lisa and Anyma | "Bad Angel" | — | songwriter | |
| 2026 | Rosalía | "Focu 'Ranni" | Lux | songwriter | |
| 2026 | Le Sserafim | "Irony" | Pureflow Pt. 1 | songwriter | |
