= Drip (Cardi B song) =

Promotional single by Cardi B featuring Migos

from the album Invasion of Privacy
- Released: April 4, 2018
- Genre: Hip hop; trap
- Length: 4:23
- Label: Atlantic
- Songwriters: Belcalis Almanzar; Quavious Marshall; Kirsnick Ball; Kiari Cephus; Joshua Cross
- Producers: Cassius Jay; Nonstop Da Hitman

"Drip" is a song recorded by American rapper Cardi B, featuring American hip hop trio Migos. It was written by the artists alongside Joshua Cross, with production handled by Cassius Jay and Nonstop Da Hitman. The song was released by Atlantic Records on April 4, 2018, as the first promotional single from Cardi B's debut studio album, Invasion of Privacy (2018).

== Release and composition ==
The song was made available for digital download alongside the reveal of the album's full track listing. 2 days later, it was sent to Australian radio. "Drip" is a groove-heavy trap song that features "slinky production and a pulsating trap beat". Described as "a blinking, Atlanta-style track full of hi-hat tics and tinny synth melodies", it "chugs along on looped flutes and Simon-like synth blips". Lyrically, the artists hit back at critics who have attacked them. The song's beat was originally used for an unreleased Young Thug and Future song titled "Upscale" which also featured Quavo.

== Critical reception ==
"Drip" received mixed reviews from music critics. Kevin Goddard of HotNewHipHop deemed the song "an aggressive and braggadocios record". Shaad D'Souza of Noisey wrote that the song "makes a meal out of some pretty standard Migos trap", calling it "a return to the hard-as-nails Cardi that we're used to" despite being "pretty standard Migos fare". She complimented Cardi B's ability to make good use of her only verse.

Sheldon Pearce of Pitchfork opined that the song marks a return to Cardi B's initial mindset that made her popular, describing it as "a self-assured, swag-obsessed rap parade packed with quotables". While it lacks punchiness and slickness compared to "Bodak Yellow" and "Bartier Cardi", he wrote that "the song does exude supreme self-confidence, and with Cardi that's often half the victory". Charles Holmes of MTV News wrote: "If 'Be Careful' was Cardi at her most vulnerable, then 'Drip' finds the rapper reclaiming her confidence."

== Charts ==
=== Weekly charts ===
Chart (2018)	Peak position
Australia (ARIA)	60
Canada Hot 100 (Billboard)	31
France (SNEP)	187
Greece (IFPI)	55
Ireland (IRMA)	72
New Zealand Heatseekers (RMNZ)	3
Portugal (AFP)	84
Sweden Heatseeker (Sverigetopplistan)	6
Switzerland (Schweizer Hitparade)	95
UK Singles (Official Charts)	41
UK Hip Hop/R&B (Official Charts)	26
US Billboard Hot 100	21
US Hot R&B/Hip-Hop Songs (Billboard)	15

=== Year-end charts ===
Chart (2018)	Position
US Hot R&B/Hip-Hop Songs (Billboard)	87

== Certifications ==
Region	Certification	Certified units/sales
Australia (ARIA)	Platinum	70,000^{‡}
Canada (Music Canada)	Platinum	80,000^{‡}
New Zealand (RMNZ)	Gold	15,000^{‡}
United States (RIAA)	Platinum	1,000,000^{‡}
^{‡} Sales+streaming figures based on certification alone.
