= Who Is She (disambiguation) =

Who Is She is a romantic fantasy television series

Who Is She may also refer to:

== Music ==
- "Who Is She?", a song by I Monster from the album Neveroddoreven
- "Who Is She", a song by RuPaul from Mamaru
- "Who Is She", a song by Bonnie Guitar
- "Who Is She", an unreleased song by Offer Nissim
- "Who Is She", a song by Qveen Herby
- "Who Is She", a song from Centaurworld
- "Who Is She", a song from the 2015 film score Cinderella
- "Who Is She?", a song from the soundtrack for Devilman Crybaby
- "Who Is She?", a song from the musical Doctor Zhivago
- Who Is She?!, an album by Jenna Kim Jones
- "(Who, Who, Who, Who) Who Is She?", a song from the musical The Apple Tree
- "Who Is She 2 U", a song by Brandy
- "Who Is She (And What Is She to You)?", one of several covers of "Who Is He (And What Is He to You)?"
- "Who Is She That Ascendeth", a motet by Healey Willan
- "Who Is She to Me", a song by Christian Bautista
- "Who's She", a song from the musical The Devil Wears Prada
- "Silvia (Who Is She?)", a song by Steve Winwood from About Time

== Other uses ==
- Who Is She That Looketh Forth as the Morning, a poetry book by William Everson
- Nikki Grahame: Who Is She?, a documentary by Channel 4 about Nikki Grahame

== See also ==
- Who Is It
- Aame Evaru? (transl. Who Is She?, a psychological thriller film
- Aval Yaar (transl. Who Is She?, a legal thriller film
- "Habibati Man-Takoon" (transl. My Love, Who Is She), a song by Abdel Halim Hafez
- "Min Hi?" (transl. Who Is She?), a song by Walter Micallef
