= Scribz Riley =

British record producer, singer, songwriter and rapper

- Born: Michael Orabiyi; 25 August 1993 (age 32); London, England
- Genres: R&B; hip hop; pop
- Occupations: Producer; singer; songwriter
- Years active: 2012–present
- Label: Sony Music
- Website: www.scribzriley.com

Michael Orabiyi (born 25 August 1993), known professionally as Scribz Riley, is a British record producer, songwriter, singer, and rapper from London, England. He is sometimes credited as Mike "Scribz" Riley or Mike Riley. He is the brother of singer-songwriter Talay Riley. He has collaborated and worked with artists including Khalid, Cardi B, Kehlani, H.E.R., Kendrick Lamar, Chris Brown, Tove Lo, Ella Mai, and Wiley.

== Early life ==
Born and raised in East London, Riley initially played the piano in church for his older brother, singer-songwriter Talay Riley. Later he began freestyling over grime beats while attending St. Bons Secondary School & YAP Youth Club. He also attended the Identity School of Acting, but decided to do a music career instead. He was associated with Mucky Wolfpack, the E3 crew headed by God's Gift, meanwhile learning studio craft by attending sessions for the label Alwayz Recording with his older brother Talay Riley.

== Career ==
His early credits included working with Rascals in 2012, with Wiley in 2013, and with Tove Lo as composer, producer, and keyboardist on her 2014 album Queen of the Clouds. In 2015 and 2016, he wrote and arranged for projects from Saygrace, and Julian Perretta.

In 2017, he composed and produced the track "Lights On" from H.E.R.'s self-titled compilation album. He also composed and produced for Khalid's American Teen and Chris Brown's Heartbreak on a Full Moon.

In 2018, he provided production work on the track "Ring" from Cardi B's album Invasion of Privacy, which won the Grammy Award for Best Rap Album and was also nominated for Album of the Year in 2019. He also produced Zacari's song "Redemption" from the Black Panther soundtrack, which was also nominated for a Grammy Award for Album of the Year in 2019.

On 25 May 2018, he was featured with Rachel Furner on the cover of Music Week's annual Hitmakers edition as one of "the next generation of superstar songwriters."

In May 2020, Riley released a single titled "Impress Me" featuring Headie One. The single was scheduled to be part of his debut solo project, which was later cancelled.

== Select discography ==
Song or Album	Artist	Year	Label	Role
Free Spirit	Khalid	2019	RCA	Composer, Producer
"Redemption"	Zacari	2018	Top Dawg Ent./Aftermath Records/Interscope Records	Composer, Producer
"Ring"	Cardi B featuring Kehlani	2018	Atlantic Records	Instrumentation, Producer, Programming
"Lights On"	H.E.R.	2017	RCA	Writing, Engineer, Producer
"How to Love Me"	Saygrace	2016	RCA	Writing, Arranger, Producer
