= Who Is It =

Who Is It may refer to:

- "Who Is It" (Michael Jackson song)
- "Who Is It" (Björk song)
- "Who Is It", a song by Talking Heads from Talking Heads: 77

== See also ==
- Who Is She (disambiguation)
