= Invasion of Privacy (album) =

2018 studio album by Cardi B

Studio album by Cardi B
- Released: April 6, 2018
- Recorded: 2017–2018
- Studio: The Cutting Room (New York City)
- Genres: Hip-hop; trap
- Length: 48:13
- Labels: KSR; Atlantic
- Producers: Craig Kallman; 30 Roc; Allen Ritter; Andrew Watt; Benny Blanco; Boi-1da; Cubeatz; DJ Mustard; Frank Dukes; J. White Did It; Keyz; Murda Beatz; Needlz; Scribz Riley; Tainy; Vinylz

Cardi B chronology
Gangsta Bitch Music, Vol. 2 (2017)	Invasion of Privacy (2018)	Am I the Drama? (2025)

Singles from Invasion of Privacy
- 1. "Bodak Yellow" Released: June 16, 2017; 2. "Bartier Cardi" Released: December 22, 2017; 3. "Be Careful" Released: March 30, 2018; 4. "I Like It" Released: May 25, 2018; 5. "Ring" Released: August 28, 2018

Invasion of Privacy is the debut studio album by American rapper Cardi B. It was released on April 6, 2018, through Atlantic Records and KSR. The album is primarily hip-hop, but also includes elements of trap, Latin trap and R&B. It features production from 30 Roc, Andrew Watt, Benny Blanco, Boi-1da, Craig Kallman, Cubeatz, DJ Mustard, Frank Dukes, J. White Did It, Keyz, Murda Beatz, Needlz, Tainy, and Vinylz, among others. The album features guest appearances by Migos, Chance the Rapper, Kehlani, SZA, 21 Savage, J Balvin, Bad Bunny, and YG.

The album debuted atop the US Billboard 200 with 255,000 units earned in its first week, including 202.6 million on-demand streams—the largest female rap album streaming week of all time—and 103,000 pure copies. Cardi B became the first female artist to chart thirteen songs simultaneously on the Billboard Hot 100 and the album was supported by five singles–"Bodak Yellow", "Bartier Cardi" (featuring 21 Savage), "Be Careful", "I Like It" (with Bad Bunny and J Balvin), and "Ring" (featuring Kehlani). Both Diamond-certified singles "Bodak Yellow" and "I Like It" reached number one on the Billboard Hot 100, making Cardi B the first female rapper to top the chart more than once, and making the album the female rap album with the most Hot 100 number-one songs—a record later tied with her own second album, Am I the Drama?.

With over seven million units sold in the US to date, Invasion of Privacy is the best-selling female rap album of the 21st century, according to Luminate. It broke the record for longest-charting album by a female rapper on the Billboard 200, surpassing The Miseducation of Lauryn Hill, and has spent three full years on the chart. In December 2019, it became the most-streamed female rap album on Spotify and Apple Music, and the most-viewed female rap album on YouTube. It has been certified 6× Platinum by the Recording Industry Association of America (RIAA), becoming the highest-certified female rap album of the 21st century, while further in 2022 becoming the first album in music history to have all its tracks certified platinum or higher by the RIAA.

Invasion of Privacy was met with critical acclaim. A number of music publications included it among their lists of best albums of the year, with Rolling Stone and Time listing it at number one. Several publications ranked it among the best albums of the 2010s as well, with Rolling Stone placing it at number thirty-four. Among its accolades, it won Best Rap Album at the 61st Annual Grammy Awards, with Cardi B becoming the first female rapper to win the award as a solo artist. It also became the first female rap album in fifteen years to be nominated for Album of the Year, with "I Like It" being nominated for Record of the Year and "Be Careful" for Best Rap Performance. "Bodak Yellow" was nominated for Best Rap Song and Best Rap Performance at the previous ceremony. At the 2019 BET Awards, Invasion of Privacy won the BET Award for Album of the Year.

The album was made available for streaming on April 5, 2018, but was not available on any physical format upon its initial release. It would later be released for digital download worldwide, a day later, on April 6. The album was eventually released on vinyl on December 7, 2018, and on CD on February 22, 2019. A deluxe edition was intended to be released on January 25, 2019, and include "Money", "Press", and potentially three other tracks, but was scrapped for unknown reasons. Those two aforementioned songs were eventually included in the 2025 sophomore project Am I The Drama?.

In 2026, it had all its tracks certified gold or higher in Canada.

== Background ==
Prior to the release of the album, "Bodak Yellow" reached number one on the US Billboard Hot 100, while several collaborations also reached the top 10. Those singles set multiple chart records, including making her the first female rapper to land her first three entries in the top 10 of the Hot 100, and the first female artist to achieve the same on the Hot R&B/Hip-Hop Songs chart. With her collaboration with Bruno Mars, "Finesse (Remix)", she became the first woman to have five top 10 singles simultaneously on the Hot R&B/Hip-Hop Songs. In March 2018, Cardi announced at the iHeartRadio Music Awards that the album will be released in April. She announced the release date and the title posting the album artwork in her social media pages on March 27, 2018.

== Recording and production ==
Invasion of Privacy was recorded from 2017 until early 2018, in The Cutting Room, based in New York City, based in New York. It features production from 30 Roc, Allen Ritter, Andrew Watt, Ayo, Benny Blanco, Boi-1da, Cassius Jay, Cheeze Beatz, Craig Kallman, Cubeatz, DJ Mustard, DJ Official, DJ SwanQo, Frank Dukes, Invincible, J. White, Keyz, Klenard Raphael, Murda Beatz, Matt Allen, Needlz, NES, Nonstop Da Hitman, Scribz Riley, Tainy and Vinylz, among others. Numerous notable artists collaborated with Cardi B on the project, including the Migos (whose member Offset married Cardi B in 2017), Chance the Rapper, Bad Bunny, J Balvin, Kehlani, 21 Savage, YG, and SZA.

== Music and lyrics ==
Primarily a hip hop album, Invasion of Privacy also comprises trap, Latin music and R&B, while its lyrical themes include fame, success, wealth, sex, and feminism, as well as Cardi B's past. The album opens with "Get Up 10", which speaks about Cardi B's rise to fame. It is followed by a trap song "Drip", which features a guest appearance by Migos, and speaks about jewelry, wealth, and Cardi B and Migos' status. The third track "Bickenhead" has a feminist theme; its title refers to women who work hard for money.

A hip hop and trap song "Bodak Yellow" follows, on which Cardi B confronts her enemies and makes statements such as "I don't dance now, I make money moves", referring to her past, as she used to work as a stripper before rising to fame. On the fifth track "Be Careful", Cardi B performs the hook using a softly sung vocal style over a "laidback" beat. The song also comprises "flickering" hi-hats and "slick" synths. Lyrically, "Be Careful" is a song about infidelity, where the protagonist warns her cheating partner and asks him to treat her better. During an interview, Cardi B stated that she drew inspiration from past relationships, while denying that the song was directed at her fiancé Offset.

The sixth track "Best Life" features a guest appearance by Chance the Rapper; the lyrics discuss the power of God and positive thinking. It's followed by "I Like It", a bilingual (English and Spanish) latin trap song featuring Bad Bunny and J Balvin. Invasion of Privacy also contains two R&B mid-tempo songs–"Ring" (featuring Kehlani) and "Thru Your Phone"–which both lyrically show Cardi B's emotional vulnerability.

"Ring" is followed by three hip hop and trap songs: "Money Bag", "Bartier Cardi" (featuring 21 Savage), and "She Bad" (with YG). On "Bartier Cardi", Cardi B raps about her attraction to diamonds, sports cars and sex, while 21 Savage raps about a similar theme from a male perspective.

== Release and promotion ==
Prior to the release of Invasion of Privacy, Cardi B promoted its lead single "Bodak Yellow" in several live performances, including at the BET Awards 2017 afterparty on June 25, 2017, during the 2017 MTV Video Music Awards pre-show on August 27, at the 2017 BET Hip Hop Awards on October 6, and on Jimmy Kimmel Live! on October 18.

While accepting her iHeartRadio Music Award for Best New Artist at the 2018 iHeartRadio Music Awards on March 11, 2018, Cardi B revealed that Invasion of Privacy would be released in April 2018. On March 27, 2018, she revealed both the official artwork and title for the album. The album was made available for streaming on April 5, 2018, through Atlantic Records, and was released for digital download worldwide the following day.

On April 7, 2018, Cardi B performed the first three singles on Saturday Night Live. On April 9, she co-hosted The Tonight Show Starring Jimmy Fallon, becoming the first person to co-host the show. Cardi B also performed during the Coachella Valley Music and Arts Festival on April 15 and April 20, 2018. She also performed at the Broccoli City Festival 2018 on April 28, 2018; she was also supposed to perform at the Wireless Festival in July, however, the performance was cancelled due to her pregnancy. Her summer tour in support of the album, which would run from May 4 until July 29, 2018, in the United States, Norway and Ireland, and all performances until September were also cancelled.

Cardi B was also originally scheduled to be the opening act on Bruno Mars's 24K Magic World Tour in North America during September and October 2018, however, she withdrew as she just had her daughter, Kulture. A deluxe edition including "Money", "Press", and potentially three other tracks was intended to be released on January 25, 2019, but was scrapped for unknown reasons.

== Singles ==
The album's lead single, "Bodak Yellow", was released on June 16, 2017. It topped the US Billboard Hot 100 chart for three weeks. Cardi B became the first female rapper to have a song certified Diamond by the RIAA when "Bodak Yellow" received the certification in March 2021.

"Bartier Cardi" was released on December 22, 2017, as the second single and features rapper 21 Savage. It peaked at number 14 on the US Billboard Hot 100 and was certified triple platinum by the RIAA.

"Be Careful" was released as the third single on March 30, 2018. It peaked at number 11 on the US Billboard Hot 100 and was certified triple platinum by the RIAA.

"Drip" featuring Migos was released as a promotional single on April 4, 2018, despite being released to Australian radio on April 6, 2018. It peaked at number 21 on the US Billboard Hot 100. The song has been certified platinum by the RIAA.

"I Like It", with Bad Bunny and J Balvin, debuted at number eight on the Hot 100 following the album's release. It was distributed to urban contemporary and contemporary hit radio as the album's fourth single on May 25, 2018, and several days later, the song's music video premiered on Cardi B's YouTube channel. After being released as a single, it topped the Billboard Hot 100 chart, making Cardi the first female rapper with multiple number one singles on the chart's history. The single has been certified Diamond by the RIAA, becoming the second song from the album to receive this certification, following "Bodak Yellow, and making Cardi B the first female rapper with three Diamond songs. "I Like It" and "Bodak Yellow" made Cardi B the only female rapper to have two videos on her YouTube channel with more than 1 billion views.

"Ring", featuring Kehlani, impacted US urban contemporary radio on August 28, 2018, as the fifth single. Previously, it had entered at number 28 on the Hot 100 as an album track following the album's release. The single has been certified double platinum by the RIAA.

== Critical reception ==
Professional ratings
Aggregate scores
Source	Rating
AnyDecentMusic?	8.1/10
Metacritic	84/100
Review scores
Source	Rating
AllMusic	5/5 stars
The A.V. Club	B
Entertainment Weekly	B+
Exclaim!	9/10
The Guardian	4/5 stars
The Independent	4/5 stars
NME	4/5 stars
Pitchfork	8.7/10
Rolling Stone	4/5 stars
Vice (Expert Witness)	A

Invasion of Privacy received widespread acclaim from music critics. At Metacritic, which assigns a normalized rating out of 100 to reviews from mainstream publications, the album received an average score of 84, based on 24 reviews, indicating "universal acclaim". Ben Beaumont-Thomas of The Guardian gave Invasion of Privacy four out of five stars, and called it "a magnificent debut that fuses vulnerability, sexual voraciousness, paranoia, and party music" and wrote that the album "shows the rapper is capable of far more than punchy put-downs". For Exclaim!, Erin Lowers scored the album a 9 out of 10, noting that her softer singles add "a new dimension" to her artistry, and adding that the release "feels like her 'Lemonade' moment, one that magnifies her insecurities for public consumption."

Maeve McDermott of USA Today gave the album another positive review, stating that "at 13 tracks, Invasion of Privacy isn't overstuffed with endless filler tracks like many releases by Cardi's rap peers. Leave it to Cardi, marketing queen, to know that fans get exhausted when performers overstay their welcome in attempts to rack up streaming numbers. The hip hop star likely doesn't have to worry about that, considering her album seems destined for charts success, if "Bodak Yellow"'s record-breaking last year was any indication." Jem Aswad of Variety called it "one of the most powerful debuts of this millennium" and praised its opening number "Get Up 10" as an "empowering opening autobiographical testimonial," though he also felt "in a couple of cases the featured artists run off with the song so completely that it feels like Cardi is a guest on her own album." Eleanor Halls of GQ wrote: "Invasion of Privacy proves "Bodak Yellow" was far from a summer one-hit wonder. These money moves are played for the long game."

Rob Sheffield of Rolling Stone described the album as "lavishly emotional, intimately personal, wildly funny," and concluded "Invasion proves she's here to stay." For Pitchfork, Sheldon Pearce awarded the album "Best New Music", writing that "Cardi B's remarkable debut places her, without a doubt, in the pantheon of great rappers. It is both brazen and vulnerable, filled with wild amounts of personality, style, and craft". Jon Caramanica of The New York Times noted, "she is more versatile than most rappers or pop stars of any stripe," adding, "[it] is also, notably, a hip-hop album that doesn't sound like any of its temporal peers."

Chris Richards of The Washington Post commented: "She seems to be telling one long story here — about self-empowerment, beating the odds, transcendence — but the force of Cardi's narrative resides in the sound of her voice as much as it does in her words. You can hear it during the album's grand finale, "I Do," when she asks, "My little 15 minutes lasted long as hell, huh?" What a victory speech. Close your eyes and you might feel the confetti falling on your shoulders, too." Carrie Battan of The New Yorker complimented Invasion of Privacy by saying "[it] is as studious as it is bombastic."

Time magazine named Invasion of Privacy the best album of 2018, stating, "Cardi's debut doesn't just earn her a seat at hip-hop's table—it marks her as a singular voice."

=== Accolades ===
A number of music publications included Invasion of Privacy among their top 10 albums of the year lists, with Rolling Stone and Time listing it at number one. In 2019, Rolling Stone and Pitchfork listed the album as one of the greatest albums of the decade, placing it at number 34 and 73, respectively. In 2022, Rolling Stone ranked the album at number 20 on its list of "100 Best Debut Albums of All Time".

All genres (2018)

- 1st – Capital XTRA
- 1st – Entertainment Tonight
- 1st – The Ringer
- 1st – Rob Sheffield, Rolling Stone
- 1st – Staff, Rolling Stone
- 1st – Time
- 2nd – Billboard
- 2nd – Entertainment Weekly
- 2nd – Esquire
- 3rd – A.Side
- 3rd – Dagbladet
- 3rd – Highsnobiety
- 3rd – Metro Times
- 3rd – The New Zealand Herald
- 3rd – Okayplayer
- 3rd – Paper
- 3rd – Refinery29
- 3rd – Thrillist
- 3rd – Staff, Yahoo!
- 4th – El Periódico de Catalunya
- 4th – The Guardian
- 4th – The Nation
- 4th – Stereogum
- 4th – Vibe
- 5th – The Daily Beast
- 5th – Rhian Daly, DIY
- 6th – BrooklynVegan
- 6th – Karl Smith, Kerrang!
- 6th – The Line of Best Fit
- 6th – The Mercury News
- 6th – The Music
- 6th – NPR Music
- 6th – Slant
- 7th – Omaha World-Herald
- 8th – Consequence of Sound
- 8th – Jon Caramanica, The New York Times
- 8th – NME
- 8th – Uproxx
- 9th – Marianne Eloise, Kerrang!
- 10th – Complex
- 10th – Erik Leijon, Cult MTL
- 10th – NBC News
- 10th – The Sunday Times
- Top 10 (unordered list) – El Universal
- Top 10 (unordered list) – G1
- Top 10 (unordered list) – The Georgia Straight
- Top 10 (unordered list) – Out
- Top 10 (unordered list) – People
- 11th – Crack Magazine
- 13th – Dazed
- 13th – Noisey
- 13th – Jem Aswad, Variety
- 14th – Clash
- 14th – Gaffa (Denmark)
- 16th – Esquire (UK)
- Top 16 (unordered list) – Marie Claire
- 19th – Newsday
- 19th – Pitchfork
- 20th – Fact
- 20th – The Independent
- Top 20 (unordered list) – Junkee
- 21st – Flood Magazine
- 21st – Spin
- 23rd – The Triangle
- 37th – John Meagher, Irish Independent
- 42nd – PopMatters
- 54th – The Quietus
- Best of 2018 (unordered list) – Buzznet
- Best of 2018 (unordered list) – Chicago Sun-Times
- Best of 2018 (unordered list) – Evening Standard
- Best of 2018 (unordered list) – Gothamist
- Best of 2018 (unordered list) – GQ
- Best of 2018 (unordered list) – La Vanguardia
- Best of 2018 (unordered list) – New York Post
- Best of 2018 (unordered list) – The Philadelphia Inquirer
- Best of 2018 (unordered list) – San Diego CityBeat
- Best of 2018 (unordered list) – Slate
- Best of 2018 (unordered list) – USA Today

Hip-hop and rap (2018)

- 1st – Rolling Stone
- 1st – BrooklynVegan
- 1st – Exclaim!
- 1st – Stereogum
- 2nd – Billboard
- 3rd – NPR Music
- 4th – Salon
- 5th – Paste
- 6th – The Austin Chronicle
- 7th – Revolt TV
- 9th – PopMatters
- 10th – HipHopDX
- Top 10 (unordered list) – Yardbarker
- Top 50 (unordered list) – XXL
- Best of 2018 (unordered list) – AllMusic
- Best of 2018 (unordered list) – The A.V. Club
- Best of 2018 (unordered list) – Pitchfork

Pop (2018)

- 4th – The Austin Chronicle

All-genres (decade)

- 8th – Spin
- 13th – Billboard
- 34th – Rolling Stone
- 35th – NME
- 56th – Stereogum
- 58th – Slant
- 67th – Paste
- 73rd – Pitchfork
- 79th – BrooklynVegan
- 83rd – Consequence of Sound

== Awards and nominations ==
Invasion of Privacy won the Grammy Award for Best Rap Album, making Cardi B the first solo female artist to win the award in history. Its single "I Like It" was nominated for Record of the Year, while "Be Careful" was nominated for Best Rap Performance. It became the first female rap album in fifteen years since Under Construction (2002) by Missy Elliott to be nominated for Album of the Year.

Award nominations for Invasion of Privacy
Award	Year (Note: Indicates the year of ceremony. Each year is linked to the article about the awards held that year, wherever possible.)	Category	Result	Ref.
BET Awards	2019	Album of the Year	Won	
BET Hip Hop Awards	2018	Album of the Year	Nominated	
Billboard Music Awards	2019	Top Billboard 200 Album	Nominated	
Billboard Music Awards	2019	Top Rap Album	Nominated	
Break the Internet Awards	2018	Music Drop of the Year	Nominated	
Norway GAFFA Awards	2018	Best Foreign Album	Nominated	
Grammy Awards	2019	Album of the Year	Nominated	
Grammy Awards	2019	Best Rap Album	Won	
Guinness World Records	2019	Most streamed album on Apple Music in one week by a female artist	Won	
Juno Awards	2019	International Album of the Year	Nominated	
People's Choice Awards	2018	Album of 2018	Nominated	

== Commercial performance ==
Invasion of Privacy was certified gold by the Recording Industry Association of America (RIAA) on the day of its release due to the track-equivalent units moved by its previously released singles "Bodak Yellow" and "Bartier Cardi". It was certified double platinum on October 3, 2018, and triple platinum on April 3, 2019, following its physical release on CD. On December 20, 2018, all thirteen tracks were certified gold or higher by the RIAA, making her the first female artist to achieve such feat, and third overall. On March 24, 2022, Invasion of Privacy became the first album to have all of its tracks certified platinum or higher by the RIAA. At 6× Platinum, as of September, 2025, it is the highest-certified female rap album of the 21st century.

The album set multiple streaming records upon release. On April 13, 2018, Apple Music announced that Invasion of Privacy set a new record for the most streamed album by a female artist in a single week with over a hundred million streams. The album debuted at number one on the US Billboard 200 chart, moving 255,000 album-equivalent units with 103,000 coming from pure album sales in its first week. It achieved the largest on-demand audio streaming week ever for an album by a woman and for a female rap album, with 202.6 million streams. At the time of its release, it became the second biggest first-week sales of 2018. Cardi B became the fifth female rapper to top the chart. On the US Billboard Hot 100 chart dated April 21, Cardi B listed 13 songs, with 12 of them being songs from Invasion of Privacy, thus surpassing Beyoncé for the most simultaneous songs on the chart by a solo female artist. The record was later broken by Billie Eilish in 2019 when 12 tracks from her album When We All Fall Asleep, Where Do We Go? and two additional singles charted on the Hot 100 in a single week.

In its second week, the album fell to number two on the chart, earning an additional 129,000 units, dropping forty-nine percent from the first week. In its third week, the album remained at number two with over 91,000 units, dropping thirty percent from the previous week. It has spent twenty one consecutive weeks within the top ten on the chart, which is the most weeks for a female rap album— including eight non-consecutive weeks within the top five. It also spent twenty two consecutive weeks within the top ten on the Top R&B/Hip Hop chart. As of July 6, 2018, Invasion of Privacy is the best-performing female album of 2018 and the third overall in the United States. The album remained the largest female debut of 2018 in the country until September 2018, with the release of Carrie Underwood's Cry Pretty. In the US, Invasion of Privacy was the fourth best selling album of 2018 with 2,060,000 album-equivalent units, the best selling for a female artist that year. In December 2019, it became the most-streamed female rap album on Spotify.

Invasion of Privacy is one of the best-selling female rap albums of the 2010s according to the Recording Academy and the Billboard 200 decade-end chart. In January 2020, it became the longest-charting debut album by a female rapper on the Billboard 200, surpassing Lauryn Hill's The Miseducation of Lauryn Hill (1998). In August 2020, it became the longest-charting album by a female rapper, surpassing 124 weeks. It surpassed 150 weeks in the chart in February 2021. As of August 2025, the album has earned 7.1 million equivalent album units, being the best-selling female rap album of the 21st century in the US, according to Luminate. Invasion of Privacy also debuted atop the Canadian Albums Chart, moving 12,000 album-equivalent units. It was certified Platinum by Music Canada for shipments of 80,000 copies. The album was a commercial success internationally as well, peaking within the top ten on charts in Australia, Denmark, Estonia, Finland, Flanders, Iceland, Ireland, the Netherlands, New Zealand, Norway, Sweden, and the United Kingdom.

== Impact and legacy ==
Spin staff credited the album for opening "the table to a new generation of pop artists remaking American music in their own image and accents. And Cardi will remain front-and-center." The magazine further added that Invasion of Privacy is an "invitation into [her] world of blood, sweat, and tears... it's a rebuke to much of what passes for chart-focused rap, where the artist's persona is crafted for maximum exposure. Instead, Cardi B recognized that artists of color no longer need to pander or soften themselves in order to become household names." In 2019, Consequence of Sound editors wrote "her authenticity and charisma are constants that reinforce her standing as one of the most formidable hip-hop artists of the decade," and NME stated that the album secured "her crown as the new Queen of Rap." In a book excerpt published in Jezebel of The Motherlode (2021) by Clover Hope, the author wrote that Invasion of Privacy was "the best rap debut in years and belongs in the canon along with Lil' Kim's Hard Core and Lauryn Hill's The Miseducation of Lauryn Hill," and stated that the album "jump-started a new era for women rappers in which success felt much more tangible" as Cardi B "multiplied the wealth of talent and resurrected the idea that numerous women who controlled their own stories could dominate rap at once... Never again would there only be one."

== Track listing ==
Credits adapted from Tidal.

No.	Title	Writer(s)	Producer(s)	Length
1.	"Get Up 10"	Belcalis Almanzar; James Steed; Matthew Allen; Robert Williams; Jermaine Preyan; Anthony Tucker; Maurice Jordan; Jordan Thorpe	DJ SwanQo; Matt Allen	3:51
2.	"Drip" (featuring Migos)	Almanzar; Quavious Marshall; Kiari Cephus; Kirsnick Ball; Joshua Cross; Gary Fountaine; Thorpe	Cassius Jay; Nonstop da Hitman	4:23
3.	"Bickenhead"	Almanzar; Austin Owens; James Foye III; Philip Coleman; Dion Norman; Derrick Ordogne; Jordan Houston; Paul Beauregard; Todd Shaw	Ayo; Keyz; NES	3:01
4.	"Bodak Yellow"	Almanzar; Klenord Raphael; Thorpe; Anthony White; Laquan Green; Bill Kapri	J. White Did It; Green^{[c]}	3:43
5.	"Be Careful"	Almanzar; Matthew Samuels; Adam Feeney; Anderson Hernandez; Thorpe; Marilyn Bergman; Alan Bergman; Robert Diggs; Lauryn Hill; Clifford Smith; Lamont Hawkins; Dennis Coles; Gary Grice; Jason Hunter; Russell Jones; Corey Woods; Marvin Hamlisch	Boi-1da; Frank Dukes; Vinylz	3:30
6.	"Best Life" (featuring Chance the Rapper)	Almanzar; Chancelor Bennett; Thorpe; Samuels; Allen Ritter	Boi-1da; Allen Ritter	4:44
7.	"I Like It" (with Bad Bunny and J Balvin)	Almanzar; Benito Martínez; José Osorio; Raphael; Thorpe; Vincent Watson; Xavier Vargas; Edgar Vargas; Luian Malave; Edgar Machuca; Marcos Masís; Noah Assad; Tony Pabón; Manny Rodriguez; Benny Bonnilla	Craig Kallman; J. White Did It; Tainy; Invincible^{[c]}; Nick Seeley^{[a]}	4:13
8.	"Ring" (featuring Kehlani)	Almanzar; Kehlani Parrish; Khari Cain; Michael Orabiyi; Thorpe; Desmond Dennis; Nija Charles	Needlz; Scribz Riley	2:57
9.	"Money Bag"	Almanzar; Raphael; Thorpe; White; Green	J. White Did It; Green^{[c]}	3:49
10.	"Bartier Cardi" (featuring 21 Savage)	Almanzar; Shayaa Abraham-Joseph; Samuel Gloade; Darryl McCorkell; Jacquez Lowe	30 Roc; Cheeze Beatz	3:44
11.	"She Bad" (with YG)	Almanzar; Keenon Jackson; Dijon McFarlane; Leslie Wakefield, Jr.; Thorpe	Mustard; DJ Official	3:50
12.	"Thru Your Phone"	Almanzar; Andrew Wotman; Ali Tamposi; Benjamin Levin; Thorpe; Justin Tranter	Andrew Watt; Benny Blanco; Louis Bell^{[a]}	3:08
13.	"I Do" (featuring SZA)	Almanzar; Thorpe; Charles; Raphael; Shane Lindstrom; Kevin Gomringer; Tim Gomringer	Murda Beatz; Cubeatz	3:20
Total length:				48:13

Notes

- ^{^[c]} signifies a co-producer
- ^{^[a]} signifies an additional producer
- "I Like It" features additional background vocals by Andrew Tinker, Holly Seeley, Michael Romero, Nick Seeley and Sarah Sellers
- "Thru Your Phone" features background vocals by Andrew Watt and uncredited vocals by Ali Tamposi

Sample credits

- "Get Up 10" contains an interpolation of "Dreams and Nightmares", performed by Meek Mill and written by Maurice Jordan, Jermaine Preyan, Robert Williams and Anthony Tucker.
- "Bickenhead" contains a sample of "Chickenhead", written by Jordan Houston, Paul Beauregard and Todd Shaw, performed by Project Pat.
- "Bodak Yellow" contains an interpolation of "No Flockin", performed by Kodak Black.
- "Be Careful" contains an interpolation of "Ex-Factor", written and performed by Lauryn Hill.
- "I Like It" contains a sample of "I Like It Like That", written by Tony Pabon and Manny Rodriguez, and performed by Pete Rodriguez.

== Personnel ==
=== Performance ===
- Cardi B – primary artist
- Migos – featured artist
- Chance the Rapper – featured artist
- Bad Bunny – artist
- J Balvin – artist
- Kehlani – featured artist
- 21 Savage – featured artist
- YG – artist
- SZA – featured artist
- Ali Tamposi – uncredited vocals (track 12)
- Holly Seeley – background vocals (track 7)
- Nick Seeley – background vocals (track 7)
- Michael Romero – background vocals (track 7)
- Andrew Tinker – background vocals (track 7)
- Sarah Sellers – background vocals (track 7)
- Andrew Watt – background vocals (track 12)

=== Instrumentation ===
- Juan Chavez – trumpets (track 7)
- Andrew Watt – guitar (track 12)
- Benny Blanco – keyboards (track 12)

=== Production ===
- Darrale Jones – executive production
- Brooklyn Johnny – executive production
- Craig Kallman – executive production
- Avery Earls – production coordinator (track 8)
- Carlyn Calder – production coordinator (track 8)
- Donnie Meadows – production coordinator (track 8)
- Andrew Luftman – production coordinator (track 12)
- Sarah Shelton – production coordinator (track 12)
- Sofia Yen – production coordinator (track 12)
- Zvi Edelman – production coordinator (track 12)

=== Technical ===
- DJ SwanQo – programming (track 1), additional recording (track 7), editing (track 7)
- Matt Allen – programming (track 1)
- Cassius Jay – programming (track 2)
- Max Lord – recording (track 2)
- Nonstop Da Hitman – programming (track 2)
- Ayo & Keys – programming (track 3)
- NES – programming (track 3)
- J. White Did It – programming (tracks 4, 7, and 9)
- Laquan Green – programming (tracks 4 and 9)
- Boi-1da – programming (tracks 5 and 6)
- Frank Dukes – programming (track 5)
- Vinylz – programming (track 5)
- Allen Ritter – programming (track 6)
- Craig Kallman – programming (track 7), editing (track 7)
- Invincible – programming (track 7)
- Tainy – programming (track 7)
- Needlz – programming (track 8)
- Scribz Riley – programming (track 8)
- 30 Roc – programming (track 10)
- Cheeze Beatz – programming (track 10)
- DJ Mustard – programming (track 11)
- DJ Official – programming (track 11)
- Andrew Watt – programming (track 12)
- Benny Blanco – programming (track 12)
- Murda Beatz – programming (track 13)
- Nick Seeley – additional programming (track 7)
- David Rodriguez – engineering (track 12)
- Geoff Swan – engineering (track 12)
- Michael Freeman – engineering (track 12)
- Ebonie Smith – engineering assistance (track 7), editing (track 7)
- Evan LaRay – recording (all tracks), engineering (track 12)
- Louie Gomez – additional recording (track 7), editing (track 7)
- Peter Kim – additional recording (track 7), editing (track 7)
- Joel Iglesias – additional recording (track 7)
- Leslie Brathwaite – mixing (tracks 1–10, and 13)
- MixedByAli – mixing (track 11)
- Mark Stent – mixing (track 12)
- Colin Leonard – mastering
- Joe Pomarico – editing (track 7)
- Kuk Harrell – editing (track 7)

=== Artwork ===
- Brian Rainney – packaging production
- Jora Frantzis – photography
- Nicholas Fulcher – art direction & design

== Charts ==
=== Weekly charts ===
Weekly chart performance
Chart (2018–2019)	Peak position
Australian Albums (ARIA)	5
Austrian Albums (Ö3 Austria)	21
Belgian Albums (Ultratop Flanders)	10
Belgian Albums (Ultratop Wallonia)	43
Canadian Albums (Billboard)	1
Danish Albums (Hitlisten)	6
Dutch Albums (Album Top 100)	7
Estonian Albums (Eesti Ekspress)	2
Finnish Albums (Suomen virallinen lista)	9
French Albums (SNEP)	35
German Albums (Offizielle Top 100)	39
Greek Albums (IFPI)	29
Icelandic Albums (Tónlistinn)	5
Irish Albums (IRMA)	2
Italian Albums (FIMI)	37
Japanese Albums (Oricon)	112
Lithuanian Albums (AGATA)	28
New Zealand Albums (RMNZ)	2
Norwegian Albums (VG-lista)	4
Scottish Albums (Official Charts)	18
Slovak Albums (ČNS IFPI)	41
Swedish Albums (Sverigetopplistan)	7
Swiss Albums (Schweizer Hitparade)	20
UK Albums (Official Charts)	5
UK R&B Albums (Official Charts)	2
US Billboard 200	1
US Top R&B/Hip-Hop Albums (Billboard)	1

=== Year-end charts ===
Year-end chart performance
Chart (2018)	Position
Australian Albums (ARIA)	34
Belgian Albums (Ultratop Flanders)	104
Canadian Albums (Billboard)	14
Danish Albums (Hitlisten)	39
Dutch Albums (Album Top 100)	89
Estonian Albums (Eesti Ekspress)	23
Icelandic Albums (Tónlistinn)	25
New Zealand Albums (RMNZ)	22
Norwegian Albums (VG-lista)	18
Swedish Albums (Sverigetopplistan)	43
UK Albums (OCC)	55
US Billboard 200	6
US Top R&B/Hip-Hop Albums (Billboard)	3

Year-end chart performance
Chart (2019)	Position
Australian Albums (ARIA)	38
Canadian Albums (Billboard)	35
Icelandic Albums (Tónlistinn)	82
New Zealand Albums (RMNZ)	28
US Billboard 200	19
US Top R&B/Hip-Hop Albums (Billboard)	12

Year-end chart performance
Chart (2020)	Position
Australian Albums (ARIA)	84
US Billboard 200	78
US Top R&B/Hip-Hop Albums (Billboard)	45

Year-end chart performance
Chart (2021)	Position
US Billboard 200	110

Year-end chart performance
Chart (2022)	Position
US Billboard 200	171

=== Decade-end charts ===
2010s chart performance for Invasion of Privacy
Chart (2010–2019)	Position
US Billboard 200	38

== Certifications and sales ==
Certifications and sales
Region	Certification	Certified units/sales
Australia (ARIA)	2× Platinum	140,000^{‡}
Canada (Music Canada)	4× Platinum	320,000^{‡}
Denmark (IFPI Danmark)	Platinum	20,000^{‡}
France (SNEP)	Gold	50,000^{‡}
Iceland (Tónlistinn)	—	1,622
Italy (FIMI)	Gold	25,000^{‡}
New Zealand (RMNZ)	3× Platinum	45,000^{‡}
Norway (IFPI Norway)	Platinum	20,000^{‡}
Poland (ZPAV)	Gold	10,000^{‡}
United Kingdom (BPI)	Platinum	300,000^{‡}
United States (RIAA)	6× Platinum	6,000,000^{‡}
^{‡} Sales+streaming figures based on certification alone.

== Release history ==
List of release dates, with region, edition(s), format(s), label(s) and reference(s) shown
Region	Date	Edition(s)	Format(s)	Label(s)	Ref.
Various	April 5, 2018	Standard	Streaming	Atlantic	
Various	April 6, 2018	Standard	Digital download	Atlantic	
Various	December 7, 2018	Standard	Vinyl	Atlantic	
Various	February 22, 2019	Standard	CD	Atlantic	
Japan	February 27, 2019	Standard	CD	Warner Music Japan	

== See also ==
- List of 2018 albums
- List of Billboard 200 number-one albums of 2018
- List of Billboard number-one R&B/hip-hop albums of 2018
- List of number-one albums of 2018 (Canada)
- List of UK top-ten albums in 2018
