= Bickenhead =

2018 song performed by Cardi B

Song by Cardi B

from the album Invasion of Privacy
- Genre: Bounce
- Length: 3:01
- Label: Atlantic
- Songwriters: Belcalis Almanzar; Jordan Thorpe; Austin Owens; James Foye III; Derrick Ordogne; Dion Norman; Jordan Houston; Paul Beauregard; Philip Coleman; Todd Shaw
- Producers: Ayo; Keyz; Nes

"Bickenhead" is a song by American rapper Cardi B from her debut studio album Invasion of Privacy (2018). It was written by Cardi B and Pardison Fontaine alongside producers by Ayo, Keyz and Nes. It samples Project Pat's song "Chickenhead", written by Juicy J, DJ Paul and Todd Shaw, which itself samples DJ Jimi's "Bitches (Reply)", written by Derrick Ordogne and Dion Norman; therefore they are all credited among the composers. It debuted at number 43 on the US Billboard Hot 100 the week following the album's release.

== Background and production ==
An explicit song that expresses sexual liberation, "Bickenhead" builds on Cardi B's affinities with Southern rap, while serving as a response to Project Pat's "Chickenhead." Chickenhead is a derogatory term popularized in 1990s hip hop music that refers to a woman that performs oral sex indiscriminately. Changing the message, in the lyrics of "Bickenhead", reviewers noted Cardi B "takes ownership of her sexuality".

Dion Norman, who co-wrote the sampled song "Bitches (Reply)", stated about "Bickenhead":

"I was really amazed that it would be Cardi B that would do the record, especially her being from the Bronx. I thought that that spoke volumes of how far New Orleans music has traveled, but I also thought that it was appropriate because she's been under scrutiny and somewhat of an underdog that has actually persevered to a level of success [...] When I heard the record, I told [the contact person], 'Man, Cardi B needs to put that on her album.'"

== Critical reception ==
In Complex, Kiana Fitzgerald said, "the beat itself is faithful to the first, with slight variations that make it sound like 2018 while still invoking the feel of the early '00s. It sounds like the song Cardi's been waiting her whole career to make, and she swan dived right into the depths of pearl-clutching crassness that we've come to love her for. (Half the song is dedicated to advice about pussy popping.) Above all else, 'Bickenhead' is a reminder to women everywhere that there's nothing wrong with alternating being a bird with being about your paper...". Writing for AllMusic, Neil Z. Yeung felt Cardi B gets "filthy" on the "explicit" track, that "it could make Lil' Kim or Foxy Brown blush."

=== Antisemitism accusations ===
A lyric in the first verse of the song, "Lawyer is a Jew, he gon' chew up all the charges", was received poorly by some audiences and multiple Jewish publications accused Cardi B of playing into antisemitic stereotypes of lawyers being overwhelmingly Jewish or that Jewish lawyers wield disproportionate legal power. Some perceived her lyric as a reference to her legal defense team containing multiple Jewish attorneys, but still considered the lyric to be inappropriate.

== Live performances ==
Cardi B performed "Bickenhead" and "She Bad" at the 36th AVN Awards on January 26, 2019.

== Charts ==
Chart (2018)	Peak position
Canada Hot 100 (Billboard)	76
US Billboard Hot 100	43
US Hot R&B/Hip-Hop Songs (Billboard)	25

== Certifications ==
Region	Certification	Certified units/sales
Canada (Music Canada)	Gold	40,000^{‡}
United States (RIAA)	Platinum	1,000,000^{‡}
^{‡} Sales+streaming figures based on certification alone.
