= Ring (Cardi B song) =

2018 single by Cardi B

Single by Cardi B featuring Kehlani

from the album Invasion of Privacy
- Released: August 28, 2018
- Genre: Bronx drill; R&B
- Length: 2:57
- Label: Atlantic
- Songwriters: Belcalis Almanzar; Desmond Dennis; Jordan Thorpe; Kehlani Parrish; Khari Cain; Michael Orabiyi; Nija Charles
- Producers: Needlz; Scribz Riley

Cardi B singles chronology
"Girls Like You" (2018)	"Ring" (2018)	"Backin' It Up" (2018)

Kehlani singles chronology
"What I Need" (2018)	"Ring" (2018)	"Nights Like This" (2019)

Music video
- "Ring" on YouTube

"Ring" is a song by American rapper Cardi B featuring American singer Kehlani, from the former's debut studio album Invasion of Privacy (2018). It was released on August 28, 2018, through Atlantic as the fifth single from the album. It was written by the two artists, Desmond Dennis, Jordan Thorpe, DeMario Bridges and Nija Charles, along with its producers Needlz and Scribz Riley. It debuted at number 28 on the US Billboard Hot 100 the week following the album's release, and marked Kehlani's highest-charting song until her song "Folded" reached the top ten in 2026. It was serviced to rhythmic and urban contemporary radio on August 28, 2018, as the album's final single.

== Composition and lyrics ==
Described as a "smooth R&B jam" by an AllMusic editor, "Ring" shows the protagonist in a vulnerable situation, as it features themes of heartbreak and jealousy. In the lyrics, Cardi expresses frustration at a significant other that stopped contacting her, while holding onto her pride. A writer for The Guardian interpreted the lyrics as exploring "the contemporary romantic paranoia that comes from smartphones."

== Music video ==
Cardi announced the release of the music video in late July for the next month. Directed by Mike Ho and released on August 20, 2018, the video finds the rapper in tangled telephone wires, and both artists performing their respective verses inside phone booths and in stark gray rooms while wearing black and silver ensembles. Cardi B, the artist of the song, had been confused upon why the song's music video had been released that specific day, as she claimed she did not see the final edits of the video before its release. As of February 2026, it has received over 270 million views on YouTube.

== Chart performance ==
In the United States, "Ring" debuted at number 28 on the Billboard Hot 100 the week following the album's release. This gave Kehlani her first top 40 hit and highest-peaking song at the time. With the release of the music video, it re-entered the Hot 100 on the chart issue dated September 1, 2018 for a fifth charting week, and returned to the top 40 in its 15th charting week.

== Awards and nominations ==
Year	Ceremony	Category	Result	Ref.
2019	ASCAP Rhythm & Soul Music Awards	Winning Songs	Won	
2020	ASCAP Rhythm & Soul Music Awards	Winning Songs	Won	
2020	BMI R&B/Hip-Hop Awards	Winning Songs	Won	

== Charts ==
=== Weekly charts ===
Chart (2018)	Peak position
Canada Hot 100 (Billboard)	61
New Zealand Hot Singles (RMNZ)	27
US Billboard Hot 100	28
US Hot R&B/Hip-Hop Songs (Billboard)	17
US R&B/Hip-Hop Airplay (Billboard)	3
US Rhythmic Airplay (Billboard)	2

=== Year-end charts ===
Chart (2018)	Position
US Hot R&B/Hip-Hop Songs (Billboard)	61
US Rhythmic (Billboard)	40
Chart (2019)	Position
US Hot R&B/Hip-Hop Songs (Billboard)	88

== Certifications ==
Region	Certification	Certified units/sales
Canada (Music Canada)	2× Platinum	160,000^{‡}
New Zealand (RMNZ)	2× Platinum	60,000^{‡}
United Kingdom (BPI)	Silver	200,000^{‡}
United States (RIAA)	4× Platinum	4,000,000^{‡}
^{‡} Sales+streaming figures based on certification alone.

== Release history ==
Country	Date	Format	Label(s)	Ref.
United States	August 28, 2018	Rhythmic contemporary radio	KSR; Atlantic	
United States	August 28, 2018	Urban contemporary radio	KSR; Atlantic	
