= Money Bag (song) =

Song by Cardi B

from the album Invasion of Privacy
- Released: April 6, 2018
- Recorded: December 2017
- Genre: Hip hop
- Length: 3:49
- Label: Atlantic
- Songwriters: Belcalis Almanzar; Jordan Thorpe; Klenord Raphael; Laquan Green; Anthony White
- Producers: Laquan Green; J. White Did It

"Money Bag" is a song recorded by American rapper Cardi B for her debut studio album Invasion of Privacy (2018). It was written by Cardi B, Jordan Thorpe, Klenord Raphael, and its producers Laquan Green and J. White Did It. It debuted at number 58 on the US Billboard Hot 100 the week following the album's release.

== Composition ==
According to a critic, "Money Bag" shows off the rapper's "stone-cold strut". Lyrically, she boasts about her growing riches over "cavernous" production.

== Critical reception ==
Karas Lamb of Entertainment Weekly opined it "eviscerates detractors who have tried to play her cheap." In HipHopDX, Trent Clark wrote that the song is an "aggressively fun performance that neatly checks all the Cardi persona boxes." Clayton Pardum of The A.V. Club stated the rapper is "at her best detonating over cavernous production, as she does on the shit-talk extravaganza ['Money Bag']." Ben Beaumont-Thomas of The Guardian wrote, "the gigantic 'Money Bag' [...] rides a slow, caustic electro backing towards the album's most eyepop-emoji punchline: 'I don't understand what this hate is about / How you gon' suck yo man dick with my name in yo mouth?'".

== Live performances ==
Cardi B performed "Money Bag" with the Roots on The Tonight Show Starring Jimmy Fallon. The instrumental for the song was used for the piano starting at Cardi's performance of her song "Money" at the 61st Annual Grammy Awards.

== Charts ==
Chart (2018)	Peak position
Canada Hot 100 (Billboard)	84
US Billboard Hot 100	58
US Hot R&B/Hip-Hop Songs (Billboard)	32

== Certifications ==
Region	Certification	Certified units/sales
Canada (Music Canada)	Gold	40,000^{‡}
United States (RIAA)	Platinum	1,000,000^{‡}
^{‡} Sales+streaming figures based on certification alone.
