= I Do (Cardi B song) =

Song by Cardi B featuring SZA

from the album Invasion of Privacy
- Length: 3:20
- Label: Atlantic
- Songwriters: Belcalis Almanzar; Solána Rowe; Jordan Thorpe; Nija Charles; Klenord Raphael; Shane Lindstrom; Kevin Gomringer; Tim Gomringer
- Producers: Murda Beatz; Cubeatz

"I Do" is a song recorded by American rapper Cardi B for her debut studio album Invasion of Privacy (2018), featuring vocals from American singer-songwriter SZA. It was written by Cardi B, SZA, Pardison Fontaine, Nija Charles, Klenord Raphael, Murda Beatz and Cubeatz, the former and latter of whom also produced the song.. It entered at number 23 on the US Billboard Hot 100 the week following the album's release.

== Critical reception ==
"I Do" received critical acclaim. Chris Richards of The Washington Post deemed the lyrics "My little 15 minutes lasting long as hell, huh?" as "a victory speech," and the song as "the album's grand finale," since it is the closing track in Invasion of Privacy. Similarly, for Rolling Stone, Rob Sheffield said the parent album "ends on a triumphant note with SZA, the only star who really could hold her own with Cardi on a track like this." Maeve McDermott of USA Today felt "I Do" "seems destined for status as a single." Roisin O'Connor of The Independent commented, "Cardi B has a particular way of inflection that conveys her personality so beautifully. She's as confident as it seems possible to be when she spits "Pussy so good I say my own name during sex" on [the song], weaponising her own sexuality." In The New York Times, Jon Caraminaca said that Cardi B "raps about sex with the assertiveness and raw detail of Lil' Kim or Too Short," on "I Do" and "She Bad." Entertainment Weekly's Andrew Hampp ranked it 10th among the best female collaborations of the time span 1998–2018. Paste ranked it as the 15th best song of 2018.

== Live performance ==
"I Do" had its live performance debut on March 4, 2023, at the Madison Square Garden in New York City as part of a North American tour in support of SZA's second studio album, SOS (2022). Cardi B appeared as the concert's surprise guest, who joined SZA in performing her verse.

== Charts ==
Chart (2018)	Peak position
Canada Hot 100 (Billboard)	38
Ireland (IRMA)	81
US Billboard Hot 100	23
US Hot R&B/Hip-Hop Songs (Billboard)	16

== Certifications ==
Region	Certification	Certified units/sales
Australia (ARIA)	Platinum	70,000^{‡}
Canada (Music Canada)	2× Platinum	160,000^{‡}
United Kingdom (BPI)	Silver	200,000^{‡}
United States (RIAA)	2× Platinum	2,000,000^{‡}
^{‡} Sales+streaming figures based on certification alone.
