= Be Careful (Cardi B song) =

2018 single by Cardi B

Single by Cardi B

from the album Invasion of Privacy
- Released: March 30, 2018
- Genre: Hip hop
- Length: 3:30
- Label: Atlantic
- Songwriters: Belcalis Almanzar; Matthew Samuels; Anderson Hernandez; Adam Feeney; Jordan Thorpe; Marilyn Bergman; Alan Bergman; Robert Diggs; Lauryn Hill; Clifford Smith; Lamont Hawkins; Dennis Coles; Gary Grice; Jason Hunter; Russell Jones; Corey Woods; Marvin Hamlisch; Cassius Bilbro
- Producers: Boi-1da; Frank Dukes; Vinylz

Cardi B singles chronology
| "Finesse (Remix)" (2018) | "Be Careful" (2018) | "Girls" (2018) |

Music video
- "Be Careful" on YouTube

"Be Careful" is a song by American rapper Cardi B from her debut studio album Invasion of Privacy (2018). It was released on March 30, 2018, as the third single from the album. The song was written by Cardi B, Jordan Thorpe, and produced by Boi-1da, Vinylz, and Frank Dukes. It contains an interpolation from "Ex-Factor", written and performed by Lauryn Hill, which itself samples "Can It Be All So Simple", written and performed by Wu-Tang Clan. The latter song also samples "The Way We Were". Therefore, Hill, the eight members of Wu-Tang Clan, and Marvin Hamlisch, Alan Bergman and Marilyn Bergman are credited among the composers.

"Be Careful" peaked at number 11 on the US Billboard Hot 100, and topped the Rhythmic Songs chart. Internationally it reached the top 40 in Canada, Ireland, New Zealand and the United Kingdom. It received a nomination for Best Rap Performance at the 61st Annual Grammy Awards. On April 7, 2018, Cardi B performed the song on Saturday Night Live, where she revealed the pregnancy of her first child. The song has been certified quintuple platinum by the Recording Industry Association of America (RIAA).

== Background and release ==
A demo of some lines for "Be Careful" was first recorded by Pardison Fontaine, the stage name of Jordan Thorpe. Later, Cardi B added the hook and wrote the rest of the song, with production completed with the help of producers Frank Dukes, Boi-1da and Vinylz. Cardi was motivated to write the song when she was in New York City finishing her debut album, Invasion of Privacy (2018). Annoyed about her past romantic relationships and the unfaithfulness in them, she found herself tense and upset – prioritising work, with too many bad thoughts. Initially some listeners believed the song was addressed to Cardi's fiancé, rapper Offset, however she denied this. The song was released a week after its recording with "Drip" in February 2018.

== Composition ==
Cardi B performs the hook using a softly sung vocal style over a "laidback" beat. The song also comprises "flickering" hi-hats and "slick" synths. Lyrically, "Be Careful" is a song about infidelity, where the performer warns her cheating partner and asks him to treat her better. During an interview, Cardi B expressed she drew inspiration from past relationships, while denying that the song was directed at her fiancé Offset.

== Chart performance ==
"Be Careful" debuted on the Billboard Hot 100 at 16 on April 14, 2018, before rising and peaking at 11 the next week after the release of Invasion of Privacy. The song spent 20 weeks on the Billboard Hot 100.

== Music video ==
Directed by Jora Frantzis, the song's music video premiered on May 21, 2018. The clip opens with a wedding in a church filled with Jesus statues and crucifixes located in the middle of the dessert. Cardi B walks down the aisle in a wedding dress. The clip shifts to a darker hue as the rapper returns to the church, this time for her husband's funeral. The music video was filmed at the Sanctuary Adventist Church in Lancaster, California.

== Live performances ==
On April 7, 2018, Cardi B performed "Be Careful" on Saturday Night Live. During the performance she revealed her pregnancy.

== Awards and nominations ==
| Year | Ceremony | Category | Result | Ref. |
|---|---|---|---|---|
| 2019 | Grammy Awards | Best Rap Performance | Nominated | |
| 2019 | ASCAP Rhythm & Soul Music Awards | Winning Songs | Won | |
| 2019 | BMI R&B/Hip-Hop Awards | Most Performed R&B/Hip-Hop Songs | Won | |

== Charts ==
=== Weekly charts ===
| Chart (2018) | Peak position |
|---|---|
| Australia (ARIA) | 65 |
| Belgium (Ultratip Bubbling Under Flanders) | 19 |
| Canada Hot 100 (Billboard) | 24 |
| France (SNEP) | 154 |
| Greece (IFPI) | 37 |
| Ireland (IRMA) | 25 |
| New Zealand (Recorded Music NZ) | 39 |
| Portugal (AFP) | 75 |
| Scottish Singles Sales (Official Charts) | 79 |
| Sweden Heatseeker (Sverigetopplistan) | 6 |
| UK Hip Hop/R&B (Official Charts) | 13 |
| UK Singles (Official Charts) | 24 |
| US Billboard Hot 100 | 11 |
| US Hot R&B/Hip-Hop Songs (Billboard) | 8 |
| US R&B/Hip-Hop Airplay (Billboard) | 4 |
| US Rhythmic Airplay (Billboard) | 1 |

=== Year-end charts ===
| Chart (2018) | Position |
|---|---|
| US Billboard Hot 100 | 59 |
| US Hot R&B/Hip-Hop Songs (Billboard) | 32 |
| US Rhythmic (Billboard) | 21 |

== Certifications ==
| Region | Certification | Certified units/sales |
|---|---|---|
| Australia (ARIA) | 2× Platinum | 140,000^{‡} |
| Canada (Music Canada) | 3× Platinum | 240,000^{‡} |
| New Zealand (RMNZ) | 2× Platinum | 60,000^{‡} |
| United Kingdom (BPI) | Platinum | 600,000^{‡} |
| United States (RIAA) | 5× Platinum | 5,000,000^{‡} |
^{‡} Sales+streaming figures based on certification alone.

== Release history ==
| Region | Date | Format | Label | Ref. |
|---|---|---|---|---|
| Various | March 29, 2018 | Digital download | Atlantic | |
| Australia | March 30, 2018 | Contemporary hit radio | Atlantic | |
| United States | April 24, 2018 | Urban contemporary | KSR; Atlantic | |
