= Bodak Yellow =

2017 single by Cardi B

Single by Cardi B

from the album Invasion of Privacy
- Released: June 16, 2017
- Studio: Krematorium Studios (Elmont, New York)
- Genre: Hip hop; trap
- Length: 3:43
- Label: Atlantic; KSR
- Songwriters: Belcalis Almánzar; Dieuson Octave; Klenord Raphael; Jorden Thorpe; Anthony White; Laquan Green
- Producers: J. White Did It; Laquan Green

Cardi B singles chronology
"Bronx Season" (2016)	"Bodak Yellow" (2017)	"No Limit" (2017)

Music video
- "Bodak Yellow" on YouTube

"Bodak Yellow" (alternatively titled "Bodak Yellow (Money Moves)") is the major label debut single by American rapper Cardi B. It was written alongside Pardison Fontaine, Klenord Raphael, and producers J. White Did It and Laquan Green, with an additional writing credit going to Kodak Black for the interpolation of his song "No Flockin". It was released on June 16, 2017, by Atlantic Records as the lead single from her debut studio album Invasion of Privacy (2018).

Selected by The Washington Post and Pitchfork music critics as the best song of 2017, it was cited by many publications as one of the songs that defined the 2010s decade. The single topped the US Billboard Hot 100 chart for three consecutive weeks, making Cardi B the second female rapper to reach number one with a solo song, following Lauryn Hill's "Doo Wop (That Thing)" in 1998. It was Billboard's top female rap song of the year. Cardi B became the first female rapper to have a solo single certified Diamond by the Recording Industry Association of America (RIAA), when "Bodak Yellow" received the certification in 2021 for selling more than 10 million units in the country and, at 13× Platinum, as of September, 2025, it is the highest-certified female rap song of all time. Filmed in Dubai, its accompanying music video made her the first female rapper to have two videos on her YouTube channel with more than 1 billion views, as it joined "I Like It", and became the fastest solo female rap song to reach that mark on the platform.

"Bodak Yellow" received nominations for Best Rap Performance and Best Rap Song at the 60th Grammy Awards. The song won Single of the Year at the 2017 BET Hip Hop Awards, Rhythm & Bars Award at the 2017 Soul Train Music Awards, and Favorite Rap/Hip Hop Song at the 2018 American Music Awards.

== Composition and production ==
The beat for "Bodak Yellow" was created by Jermaine "J. White Did It" White, a producer from Dallas. White and Cardi B met in New York through to a shared manager and decided to work together. She stated, "every bitch that I don't like came to my head. And I pictured me, slapping it to them." White has stated he has sometimes been "intimidated" by Cardi B's violence in the recording studio, and that "our chemistry at first was a love-hate one, because I was such a general at first, and then she became the general." The name of the song was inspired by Kodak Black, a Florida rapper, because Cardi B said the cadence of words in "Bodak Yellow" reminded her of Black's 2015 song "No Flockin". Kodak Black later released a remix of "Bodak Yellow".

The lyrics, which reference the signature red sole of luxury shoe brand Louboutin, discuss her no longer needing to dance (she worked as a stripper), taunt her critics that she's now more powerful and making more money than they are, and that it's because of her work ethic. The video for the song has amassed over one billion views on YouTube.

== Critical reception ==
"Bodak Yellow" received widespread critical acclaim. Complex's writers called the song "a great, extraordinarily catchy record. The hook, the beat, her lyrics: it all works. Cardi sounds so sure of herself, it's difficult not to believe and rap along with every word. Her shit feels like early Lil' Kim, the way the fellas react to her bars. That beat drops and people go nuts." Tom Breihan of Stereogum wrote, "On 'Bodak Yellow,' Cardi uses [her] voice to fill up the synthy, minimal beat, using all the track's open space to project personality everywhere. It's a big, loud, brash, noisy song, and it's perfect." USA Today wrote, "The track’s name is a reference to the Florida rapper Kodak Black, borrowing the distinctive cadences he used on his minor hit 'No Flockin'." The Washington Post editor Chris Richards said that the song did not need a hook because "every phrase she blurts has its own ticklish melody, its own whiplash rhythm." Naming it the best song of the year, Pitchfork stated that it "emboldened many of the people—especially women of color—who were marginalized for the very things that anchor the Afro-Latina star's impenetrable pride." Dan Weiss of Consequence of Sound named it "the best rap debut in years." The Ringer considered it the best female rap song of the 2010s.

=== Accolades ===
Critics' lists
Publication	List	Rank	Ref.
Billboard	100 Best Songs of 2017	2	
Billboard	Songs That Defined the 2010s Decade	*	
Consequence of Sound	Top 100 Songs of the 2010s	25	
Elle	The 52 Best Songs That Defined the 2010s	*	
Entertainment Weekly	The 30 Best Songs of 2017	8	
GQ	The 24 Songs That Shaped the Decade	*	
Harper's Bazaar	The 35 Best Songs of the 2010s	*	
NME	The Best Songs of the Decade: The 2010s	60	
Pitchfork	The 100 Best Songs of 2017	1	
Pitchfork	The 200 Best Songs of the 2010s	30	
Refinery 29	29 Songs That Defined Us in the 2010s	25	
The Ringer	100 Best Rap Songs of the 2010s	8	
Rolling Stone	50 Best Songs of 2017	4	
Rolling Stone	The 100 Best Songs of the Decade	32	
Rolling Stone	Rob Sheffield's 50 Best Songs of the 2010s	9	
Rolling Stone	The 100 Greatest Songs of the Century So Far (2018)	59	
Stereogum	The 200 Best Songs of the 2010s	21	
Vanity Fair	10 Songs That Explain the 2010s	*	
The Washington Post	Best Music of 2017	1	

* denotes an unordered list.

== Music video ==
Cardi B with a cheetah in the music video. The presence of the real animal–which belongs to a local sultan–was proposed by the director.

The song's music video was released on June 24, 2017. The video features scenes with Cardi B in Dubai, riding camels through the desert. Production for the video cost $10,000. The video received nominations to the BET Hip Hop Awards and iHeartRadio Music Awards. As of February 2026, the video had been viewed over 1.1 billion times on YouTube.

In August 2021, "Bodak Yellow" made Cardi B the first female rapper to have two videos on her YouTube channel with more than 1 billion views, joining "I Like It", and became the fastest solo female rap song to reach that mark on the platform.

== Chart performance ==
"Bodak Yellow" debuted at number 85 on the US Billboard Hot 100 chart during the week of July 22, 2017. During its fifth week on the chart, it jumped to number 14, becoming Cardi B's first top 20 entry in the United States. It later reached number two, behind American pop singer Taylor Swift's song "Look What You Made Me Do", in the issue dated September 23, 2017, before climbing to the top of the chart two weeks later. "Bodak Yellow" topped the Hot 100 for three consecutive weeks, making it the second solo hip-hop number-one single by a female artist in the chart's history, following American rapper Lauryn Hill's "Doo Wop (That Thing)" in 1998. Spending a third week on top, it became the first song by a female rapper to spend multiple weeks atop the chart. Also the longest number one for a solo single by a female rapper at the time, the record has since been surpassed by Lizzo's "Truth Hurts" with seven weeks in 2019. In its 26th week on chart, the song re-entered the top ten, joining her other singles "MotorSport" and "No Limit", making Cardi B join the Beatles and Ashanti as the third act to place her first three chart entries in the top ten simultaneously.

In September 2019, it was certified nonuple platinum by the Recording Industry Association of America (RIAA). In March 2021, it was certified Diamond by the RIAA, making Cardi B the a female rapper that achieved this.

== Live performances ==
Cardi B debuted the song live on June 15, 2017, at the Anti-Prom cruise hosted by NYC-based skate crew Brujas and designer label Gypsy Sport. On June 25, 2017, Cardi B performed the song at the 2017 BET Awards afterparty show. On July 18, she performed "Bodak Yellow" on The Wendy Williams Show. On August 7, she performed the song at OVO Fest, an annual music festival in Toronto hosted by Canadian rapper Drake. Cardi B performed "Bodak Yellow" during the pre-show for the 2017 MTV Video Music Awards on August 27, 2017.

Cardi B went on to perform the song at the twelfth annual BET Hip Hop Awards. She opened the 2018 iHeartRadio Music Awards with a medley of "Bartier Cardi", "Bodak Yellow", "No Limit", "MotorSport" and "Finesse (Remix)". On April 7, 2018, Cardi B performed the song in a medley with "Bartier Cardi" on Saturday Night Live.

== Remixes ==
A remix of "Bodak Yellow", the "Latin Trap Remix", was officially released on August 18, 2017. The song features Cardi B rapping in Spanish and includes vocals from Dominican hip hop recording artist Messiah, who contributes a guest verse. A second official remix was released on September 18, 2017, featuring vocals by Florida-based rapper Kodak Black. Jamaican dancehall artist Spice also released a remix of the song, "Bodak Bitch". On the Fox series The Four: Battle For Stardom, Zhavia has covered and remixed the song. Bruno Mars performed a drum version of the song during several shows of his 24K Magic World Tour. Janet Jackson also performed a dance routine to a mashup of "Bodak Yellow" on tour.

== Impact ==
With Cardi B alluding to Louboutin's red bottomed shoes in the lyrics, the song generated a 217% spike in search traffic for Christian Louboutin shoes, and an estimated $4.5 million media value, according to Business of Fashion. Billboard staff acknowledged that the song made Cardi B "a hip-hop household name", further adding, "as men dominated the charts and the airwaves in 2017, Cardi B didn't just break through—she made history", referring to her becoming the second female rapper to top the Hot 100 unassisted." Another article from the magazine in 2019 stated "she left an indelible mark on the summer of 2017" as "sonically, and lyrically, no mainstream song had the same flare as 'Bodak Yellow'" during the season. In 2019, Pitchfork staff noticed that her "genuinely ground-up and people-driven" success showed that it "was possible—or inevitable, and a precursor for more success to come." In El Paso Times, Dave Acosta opined that with the song's success Cardi B gave "a new voice" to Hispanics and women, further adding, "at a time when Hispanics of all nationalities are being targeted by various government and political entities and the war rages for women's equality in health care and employment, Cardi's opening line, "You can't (expletive) with me, if you wanted to", give us an anthem and a voice—one with a heavy accent." In 2020, NPR Music stated that the "renaissance" of the dynamism of women in rap grew "in enthusiasm and breadth" since Cardi's "first historic run" in 2017. With memorable performances at Made in America and the VMAs, Cardi's flavorful club banger has undeniably taken the crown as hip-hop's song of the late summer.

== Awards and nominations ==
Year	Ceremony	Category	Result	Ref.
2017	BET Hip Hop Awards	Best Hip-Hop Video	Nominated	
2017	BET Hip Hop Awards	Impact Track	Nominated	
2017	BET Hip Hop Awards	Single of the Year	Won	
2017	Soul Train Music Awards	Rhythm & Bars Award	Won	
2018	American Music Awards	Favorite Song — Rap/Hip Hop	Won	
2018	American Music Awards	Favorite Music Video	Nominated	
2018	ASCAP Pop Music Awards	Winning Song	Won	
2018	ASCAP Rhythm & Soul Music Awards	Winning R&B/Hip-Hop Song	Won	
2018	ASCAP Rhythm & Soul Music Awards	Winning Rap Song	Won	
2018	BET Awards	Video of the Year	Nominated	
2018	BET Awards	Coca-Cola Viewers' Choice Award	Won	
2018	Billboard Music Awards	Top Streaming Song (Video)	Nominated	
2018	Billboard Music Awards	Top Rap Song	Nominated	
2018	BMI R&B/Hip-Hop Awards	Winning Song	Won	
2018	Grammy Awards	Best Rap Performance	Nominated	
2018	Grammy Awards	Best Rap Song	Nominated	
2018	iHeartRadio Music Awards	Hip-Hop Song of the Year	Nominated	
2018	iHeartRadio Music Awards	Best Lyrics	Nominated	
2018	iHeartRadio Music Awards	Best Music Video	Nominated	
2019	ASCAP Rhythm & Soul Music Awards	Winning Song	Won	

== Track listing ==
- Digital download
1. "Bodak Yellow" – 3:43
- Digital download
1. "Bodak Yellow" (featuring Kodak Black) – 2:33
- Digital download
1. "Bodak Yellow" (Latin Trap Mix) (featuring Messiah) – 3:42

== Credits and personnel ==
Recording

- Recorded, Mixed and mastered at Fight Klub Studios (New York, New York)
- Vocal Recording, at Krematorium Studio (Elmont, New York)

Personnel

Songwriting credits adapted from AllMusic and Tidal.

- Belcalis Almanzar – vocals
- Jermaine White – producer
- Laquan Green – co-producer
- Evan LaRay – mixing
- Michael Ashby – recording engineer
- Colin Leonard – mastering

== Charts ==
=== Weekly charts ===
Chart (2017–2018)	Peak position
Australia (ARIA)	33
Belgium (Ultratip Bubbling Under Flanders)	14
Belgium (Ultratip Bubbling Under Wallonia)	27
Canada Hot 100 (Billboard)	6
Canada CHR/Top 40 (Billboard)	48
Czech Republic Singles Digital (ČNS IFPI)	55
Dominican Republic (Monitor Latino)	11
France (SNEP)	70
Greece International (IFPI)	10
Ireland (IRMA)	51
Latvia (DigiTop100)	46
Netherlands (Single Top 100)	81
New Zealand (Recorded Music NZ)	24
Nigeria Airplay (Playdata charts)	2
Philippines (Philippine Hot 100)	51
Portugal (AFP)	47
Scotland Singles (OCC)	51
Slovakia Singles Digital (ČNS IFPI)	47
Sweden (Sverigetopplistan)	71
Switzerland (Schweizer Hitparade)	74
UK Singles (OCC)	24
UK Hip Hop/R&B (OCC)	11
US Billboard Hot 100	1
US Dance Club Songs (Billboard)	28
US Dance/Mix Show Airplay (Billboard)	15
US Hot R&B/Hip-Hop Songs (Billboard)	1
US R&B/Hip-Hop Airplay (Billboard)	1
US Pop Airplay (Billboard)	23
US Rhythmic Airplay (Billboard)	1

=== Year-end charts ===
Chart (2017)	Position
Australia Urban (ARIA)	27
Canada (Canadian Hot 100)	55
US Billboard Hot 100	24
US Hot R&B/Hip-Hop Songs (Billboard)	10
US Rhythmic (Billboard)	18

Chart (2018)	Position
Canada (Canadian Hot 100)	70
Portugal Full Track Download (AFP)	178
US Billboard Hot 100	54
US Hot R&B/Hip-Hop Songs (Billboard)	44
US Rhythmic (Billboard)	47

=== Decade-end charts ===
Chart (2010–2019)	Position
US Billboard Hot 100	80
US Hot R&B/Hip-Hop Songs (Billboard)	26

== Certifications ==
Region	Certification	Certified units/sales
Australia (ARIA)	6× Platinum	420,000^{‡}
Austria (IFPI Austria)	Gold	15,000^{‡}
Canada (Music Canada)	8× Platinum	640,000^{‡}
Denmark (IFPI Danmark)	Gold	45,000^{‡}
France (SNEP)	Platinum	200,000^{‡}
Germany (BVMI)	Gold	200,000^{‡}
Italy (FIMI)	Gold	25,000^{‡}
New Zealand (RMNZ)	3× Platinum	90,000^{‡}
Norway (IFPI Norway)	Gold	30,000^{‡}
Poland (ZPAV)	Platinum	20,000^{‡}
Portugal (AFP)	Platinum	10,000^{‡}
United Kingdom (BPI)	Platinum	600,000^{‡}
United States (RIAA)	13× Platinum	13,000,000^{‡}
^{‡} Sales+streaming figures based on certification alone.

== Release history ==
List of release dates, showing region, format, and label
Country	Date	Format	Version	Label	Ref.
United States	June 16, 2017	Digital download	Original	Atlantic	
United States	August 1, 2017	Urban contemporary	Original	Atlantic	
Various	August 18, 2017	Digital download	Latin Remix Trap	Atlantic	
Various	September 18, 2017	Digital download	Remix	Atlantic	

== See also ==
- List of Billboard Hot 100 number-one singles of 2017
