= Bartier Cardi =

2017 single by Cardi B

Single by Cardi B featuring 21 Savage

from the album Invasion of Privacy
- Released: December 22, 2017
- Recorded: 2017
- Genre: Hip hop; trap
- Length: 3:44
- Label: Atlantic
- Songwriters: Belcalis Almanzar; Shayaa Abraham-Joseph; Samuel Gloade; Darryl McCorkell
- Producers: 30 Roc; Cheeze Beatz

Cardi B singles chronology
"La Modelo" (2017)	"Bartier Cardi" (2017)	"Finesse (Remix)" (2018)

21 Savage singles chronology
"Crisis" (2017)	"Bartier Cardi" (2017)	"Cocky" (2018)

Music video
- "Bartier Cardi" on YouTube

"Bartier Cardi" is a song by American rapper Cardi B featuring British-American rapper 21 Savage, from the former's debut studio album Invasion of Privacy (2018). It was released on December 22, 2017, as the second single from the album. The song was written by the two performers and its producers 30 Roc and Cheeze Beatz. Its official music video received a nomination for Best Hip-Hop Video at the 2018 MTV Video Music Awards.

== Background ==
Cardi B teased the release of the single through social media and confirmed it on December 20. Before the release, she became the first female rapper to send her first three Billboard Hot 100 entries to the top 10, with "Bodak Yellow", "No Limit" and "MotorSport". The original version of the song leaked in January 2020 and featured rapper Playboi Carti.

== Composition ==
Cardi B raps a series of triplet rhythms over a minimal trap beat and synth chords, as noted by Rolling Stone. Themes in the lyrics include her attraction for diamonds, sports cars and sex. 21 Savage raps a similar theme from a male perspective. XXL described Cardi's triplet flow as Migos-esque.

== Critical reception ==
Sheldon Pearce of Pitchfork noted "her phrases sway naturally, the same way her chatter does. She never minces words, and in these verses, her taunts and insults are even more cutting." He opined the single is "even more audacious" than her previous "Bodak Yellow" and "full of the same controlled aggression", though "not as instantly quotable". He added "Cardi has a distinct presence, and next to the inexpressive 21 [Savage] she seems even livelier." Jon Caramanica in The New York Times described it as a "sinister, greasy number full of quick-tongued rapping", featuring a "charmingly snarling verse" from 21 Savage. Jose Martinez of Complex described it as a "banger", and Sidney Madden of NPR opined, for its "fairly simple rhyme scheme" it is "perfect" for fans to "belt out in the club". For Tosten Burks of Spin, 21 Savage "feels out of place".

== Music video ==
Directed by Petra Collins, the music video premiered on April 2, 2018. In the video, Cardi B performs on a silver-covered stage in red fur, satin lingerie and diamonds. The visuals are reminiscent of the Hollywood's golden era, as noted by a Vogue editor. The clip features a guest appearance by Offset.

The video features paid promotion from Fashion Nova, which Cardi B is an ambassador for. Throughout the video, many Instagram influencers and models appear including Salem Mitchell, Widney Bazile, Ashourina Washington, Destiny Anderson, and Leanna. Numerous male models are seen standing like the Statue of David in white boxer briefs, among them include twins Austin & Alec Proeh.

== Live performances ==
A snippet of the song was included during her performance with Bruno Mars of the song "Finesse" at the 60th Grammy Awards. Cardi performed "Bartier Cardi" during a medley at the 2018 iHeartRadio Music Awards. On April 7, 2018, Cardi B performed the song in a medley with "Bodak Yellow" on Saturday Night Live.

== Awards and nominations ==
Year	Ceremony	Category	Result	Ref.
2018	BET Awards	Best Collaboration	Nominated	
2018	MTV Video Music Awards	Best Hip Hop	Nominated	
2019	ASCAP Rhythm & Soul Music Awards	Winning Songs	Won	
2019	BMI R&B/Hip-Hop Awards	Most Performed R&B/Hip-Hop Songs	Won	

== Charts ==
=== Weekly charts ===
Chart (2018)	Peak position
Australia (ARIA)	77
Belgium (Ultratip Bubbling Under Flanders)	12
Belgium (Ultratip Bubbling Under Wallonia)	19
Canada Hot 100 (Billboard)	18
Czech Republic Singles Digital (ČNS IFPI)	63
France (SNEP)	91
Greece International (IFPI)	9
Hungary (Stream Top 40)	35
Ireland (IRMA)	51
Latvia (DigiTop100)	34
Netherlands (Single Top 100)	76
New Zealand Heatseekers (RMNZ)	1
Portugal (AFP)	52
Slovakia Singles Digital (ČNS IFPI)	56
Sweden (Sverigetopplistan)	58
Switzerland (Schweizer Hitparade)	79
UK Singles (Official Charts)	40
UK Hip Hop/R&B (Official Charts)	20
US Billboard Hot 100	14
US Hot R&B/Hip-Hop Songs (Billboard)	7
US R&B/Hip-Hop Airplay (Billboard)	3
US Rhythmic Airplay (Billboard)	7

=== Year-end charts ===
Chart (2018)	Position
Canada (Canadian Hot 100)	79
US Billboard Hot 100	61
US Hot R&B/Hip-Hop Songs (Billboard)	34
US Rhythmic (Billboard)	42

== Certifications ==
Region	Certification	Certified units/sales
Australia (ARIA)	2× Platinum	140,000^{‡}
Canada (Music Canada)	4× Platinum	320,000^{‡}
New Zealand (RMNZ)	Platinum	30,000^{‡}
Poland (ZPAV)	Gold	25,000^{‡}
United Kingdom (BPI)	Silver	200,000^{‡}
United States (RIAA)	4× Platinum	4,000,000^{‡}
^{‡} Sales+streaming figures based on certification alone.

== Release history ==
Region	Date	Format	Label(s)	Ref.
United States	December 22, 2017	Digital download; streaming	KSR; Atlantic	
