= DJ Snake discography =

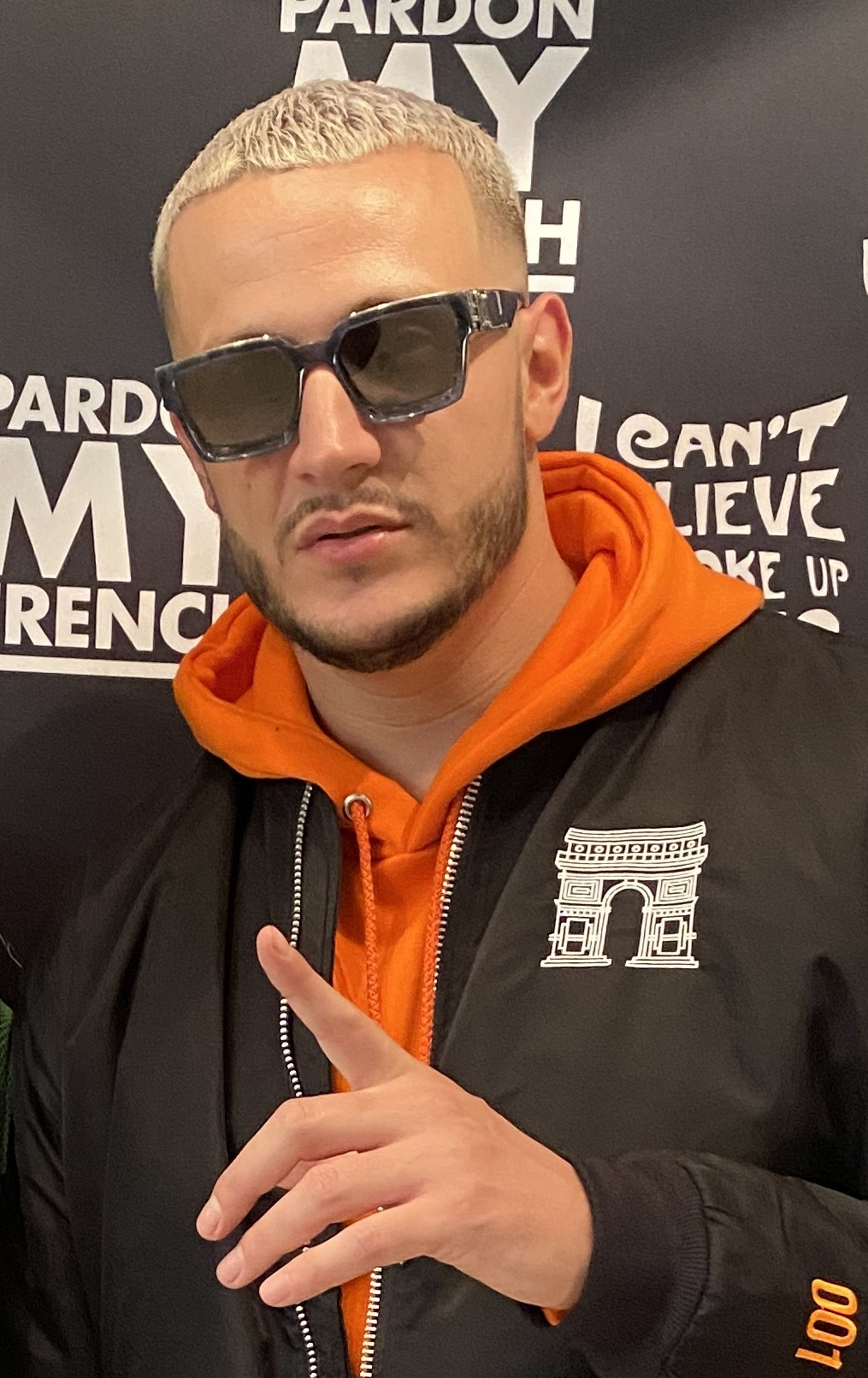
- DJ Snake in 2020
- Studio albums: 3
- Singles: 45
- Music videos: 15
- Promotional singles: 5
- DJ mixes: 5

French DJ and EDM producer DJ Snake has released three studio albums, one DJ mix, and 45 singles.

== Studio albums ==
List of studio albums, with selected details, chart positions, and certifications shown
| Title | Album details | Peak chart positions | | | | | | | | Certifications |
| Title | Album details | FRA | AUS | BEL | GER | NLD | UK | US | US Dance | Certifications |
|---|---|---|---|---|---|---|---|---|---|---|
| Encore | Released: 5 August 2016; Label: Interscope; Format: CD, Digital download, streaming | 4 | 10 | 22 | 73 | 14 | 46 | 8 | 1 | SNEP: Platinum; ARIA: Gold; RIAA: Platinum |
| Carte Blanche | Released: 25 July 2019; Label: Geffen; Format: CD, digital download, streaming | 5 | — | 23 | 99 | 23 | — | 48 | 1 | SNEP: Platinum; RIAA: Gold |
| Nomad | Released: 7 November 2025; Label: DJ Snake, Interscope; Format: CD, LP, digital download, streaming | 35 | — | — | — | — | — | — | 7 | |
"—" denotes a recording that did not chart or was not released.

== DJ mixes ==
List of DJ mixes, with details
| Title | Album details |
|---|---|
| Live at Paris La Défense Arena | Released: 2 October 2020 |

== Singles ==
=== As lead artist ===
List of singles as lead artist, with selected chart positions and certifications, showing year released and album name
| Title | Year | Peak chart positions | | | | | | | | | | Certifications | Album |
| Title | Year | FRA | AUS | AUT | BEL | CAN | GER | NLD | UK | US | US Dance | Certifications | Album |
|---|---|---|---|---|---|---|---|---|---|---|---|---|---|
| "Turn Down for What" (with Lil Jon) | 2013 | 19 | 13 | 35 | 18 | 11 | 31 | 21 | 23 | 4 | 1 | ARIA: 2× Platinum; BPI: Platinum; BVMI: 3× Gold; IFPI AUT: Gold; MC: 7× Platinum; RIAA: 8× Platinum | Non-album single |
| "Get Low" (with Dillon Francis) | 2014 | 93 | 44 | 55 | 58 | 48 | 79 | — | 88 | 61 | 5 | ARIA: Gold; MC: Platinum; RIAA: Platinum | Money Sucks, Friends Rule |
| "You Know You Like It" (with AlunaGeorge) | 2014 | 22 | 11 | 37 | 19 | 21 | 27 | 24 | 67 | 13 | 2 | ARIA: 5× Platinum; BPI: Gold; BRMA: Gold; BVMI: Platinum; MC: 3× Platinum; RIAA: 3× Platinum | Non-album single |
| "Lean On" (with Major Lazer featuring MØ) | 2015 | 2 | 1 | 3 | 2 | 3 | 4 | 1 | 2 | 4 | 1 | SNEP: Diamond; ARIA: 10× Platinum; BPI: 5× Platinum; BRMA: 3× Platinum; BVMI: 2× Platinum; IFPI AUT: Platinum; MC: 2× Platinum; NVPI: Platinum; RIAA: Diamond | Peace Is the Mission |
| "Middle" (featuring Bipolar Sunshine) | 2015 | 12 | 5 | 48 | 8 | 20 | 49 | 45 | 10 | 20 | 3 | SNEP: Platinum; ARIA: 6× Platinum; BPI: Platinum; BRMA: Platinum; BVMI: Gold; IFPI AUT: Gold; MC: 5× Platinum; RIAA: 3× Platinum | Encore |
| "Talk" (featuring George Maple) | 2016 | 39 | 57 | — | 57 | — | — | — | 131 | — | 13 | ARIA: Gold | Encore |
| "Let Me Love You" (featuring Justin Bieber) | 2016 | 1 | 2 | 4 | 6 | 4 | 1 | 1 | 2 | 4 | 2 | SNEP: Diamond; ARIA: 10× Platinum; BPI: 4× Platinum; BRMA: 2× Platinum; BVMI: Diamond; IFPI AUT: Platinum; MC: Diamond; RIAA: 6× Platinum | Encore |
| "The Half" (featuring Jeremih, Young Thug and Swizz Beatz) | 2017 | 107 | — | — | — | — | — | — | — | — | 20 | | Encore |
| "A Different Way" (featuring Lauv) | 2017 | 57 | 59 | — | 51 | 78 | — | 46 | 85 | — (Note: "A Different Way" did not enter the Billboard Hot 100, but peaked at number 23 on the Bubbling Under Hot 100 chart.) | 11 | SNEP: Platinum; ARIA: Platinum; MC: Platinum; RIAA: Gold | Non-album singles |
| "Broken Summer" (featuring Max Frost) | 2017 | — | — | — | — | — | — | — | — | — | 34 | | Non-album singles |
| "Magenta Riddim" | 2018 | 46 | — | — | — | — | — | — | — | — | 16 | MC: Gold | Carte Blanche |
| "Gassed Up" (with Jauz) | 2018 | — | — | — | — | — | — | — | — | — | — | | The Wise and the Wicked |
| "Public Enemy" (with Yellow Claw) | 2018 | — | — | — | — | — | — | — | — | — | — | | New Blood |
| "Let's Get Ill" (with Mercer) | 2018 | 132 | — | — | — | — | — | — | — | — | 45 | | Non-album singles |
| "Maradona Riddim" (with Niniola) | 2018 | — | — | — | — | — | — | — | — | — | — | | Non-album singles |
| "Taki Taki" (featuring Selena Gomez, Cardi B and Ozuna) | 2018 | 2 | 24 | 13 | 18 | 7 | 8 | 3 | 15 | 11 | 2 | SNEP: Diamond; ARIA: 3× Platinum; BPI: Platinum; BRMA: Platinum; BVMI: Platinum; IFPI AUT: Platinum; MC: 6× Platinum; RIAA: 4× Platinum | Carte Blanche |
| "Try Me" (with Plastic Toy) | 2019 | — | — | — | — | — | — | — | — | — | — | | Carte Blanche |
| "SouthSide" (with Eptic) | 2019 | — | — | — | — | — | — | — | — | — | 40 | | Carte Blanche |
| "Enzo" (with Sheck Wes, featuring Offset, 21 Savage and Gucci Mane) | 2019 | — | — | — | — | — | — | — | — | — | — | | Carte Blanche |
| "Loco Contigo" (with J Balvin and Tyga) | 2019 | 1 | — | 13 | 9 | 54 | 3 | 3 | 87 | 95 | — | SNEP: Diamond; ARIA: Platinum; BPI: Silver; BRMA: Platinum; BVMI: Platinum; IFPI AUT: Platinum; MC: 3× Platinum; RIAA: Platinum | Carte Blanche |
| "Fuego" (with Sean Paul and Anitta featuring Tainy) | 2019 | — | — | — | — | — | — | — | — | — | 31 | | Carte Blanche |
| "Trust Nobody" | 2020 | — | — | — | — | — | — | — | — | — | — | | Non-album single |
| "Selfish Love" (with Selena Gomez) | 2021 | 54 | — | — | 73 | 71 | — | — | 93 | — (Note: "Selfish Love" did not enter the Billboard Hot 100, but peaked at number five on the Bubbling Under Hot 100 chart.) | 4 | SNEP: Platinum | Revelación |
| "Enjoy Enjaami" (with Dhee featuring Arivu and Santhosh Narayanan) | 2021 | — | — | — | — | — | — | — | — | — | — | | Spotify Singles |
| "Ring the Alarm" (with Malaa) | 2021 | — | — | — | — | — | — | — | — | — | — | | Non-album single |
| "You Are My High" | 2021 | 121 | — | — | — | — | — | — | — | — | 6 | SNEP: Gold; ARIA: Platinum; BPI: Silver; MC: Gold | Nomad |
| "Run It" (featuring Rick Ross and Rich Brian) | 2021 | — | — | — | — | — | — | — | — | — | 13 | | Shang-Chi and the Legend of the Ten Rings |
| "Pondicherry" (with Malaa) | 2021 | — | — | — | — | — | — | — | — | — | ― | | Non-album singles |
| "SG" (with Ozuna, Megan Thee Stallion, and Lisa) | 2021 | 87 | — | — | — | 86 | — | — | — | — (Note: "SG" did not enter the Billboard Hot 100, but peaked at number two on the Bubbling Under Hot 100 chart.) | 4 | SNEP: Gold | Non-album singles |
| "Nightbird" | 2022 | — | — | — | — | — | — | — | — | — | 42 | | Non-album singles |
| "Guddi Riddim" (with Wade and Nooran Sisters) | 2022 | — | — | — | — | — | — | — | — | — | 35 | | Non-album singles |
| "Westside Story" | 2023 | — | — | — | — | — | — | — | — | — | — | | Non-album singles |
| "Teka" (with Peso Pluma) | 2024 | — | — | — | — | — | — | — | — | — | 11 | | Éxodo |
| "Complicated" (with Fridayy) | 2024 | — | — | — | — | — | — | — | — | — | 11 | | Non-album singles |
| "Goodbyes (Myrrh)" (with Naomi Sharon) | 2024 | — | — | — | — | — | — | — | — | — | — | | Non-album singles |
| "Piketú" (with Chencho Corleone) | 2024 | — | — | — | — | — | — | — | — | — | — | | Solo |
| "Diana" (with Hamza) | 2024 | — | — | — | — | — | — | — | — | — | — | SNEP: Gold | Non-album single |
| "Paradise" (with Bipolar Sunshine) | 2025 | 34 | — | — | — | — | — | — | — | — | — | SNEP: Diamond | Nomad |
| "Reloaded" (with Space Laces) | 2025 | — | — | — | — | — | — | — | — | — | — | | Nomad |
| "Patience" (with Amadou & Mariam) | 2025 | — | — | — | — | — | — | — | — | — | — | | Nomad |
| "Noventa" (with J Balvin) | 2025 | 186 | — | — | — | — | — | — | — | — | — | | Nomad |
| "Something Wrong" (with Don Toliver) | 2025 | — | — | — | — | — | — | — | — | — | — | | Nomad |
| "Bring the House Down" (with Dillon Francis and Trxggx) | 2025 | — | — | — | — | — | — | — | — | — | — | | Nomad |
| "In the Dark" (with Stray Kids) | 2025 | — | — | — | — | — | — | — | — | — | — | | Nomad |
| "Soda" | 2026 | — | — | — | — | — | — | — | — | — | — | | |
"—" denotes a recording that did not chart or was not released in that territory.

=== As featured artist ===
List of singles as featured artist, with chart position and certifications, showing year released and album name
| Title | Year | Peak chart positions | Certifications | Album |
| Title | Year | US Dance | Certifications | Album |
|---|---|---|---|---|
| "Good Day" (Yellow Claw featuring DJ Snake and Elliphant) | 2017 | 41 | | Los Amsterdam |
| "Creep on Me" (Gashi featuring French Montana and DJ Snake) | 2018 | — | MC: Gold | Gashi |
| "Safety" (Gashi featuring DJ Snake) | 2019 | — | | Gashi |
| "All This Lovin" (Vlade Kay featuring DJ Snake) | 2019 | — | | Non-album single |
"—" denotes a recording that did not chart or was not released.

=== Promotional singles ===
List of promotional singles, with chart positions, showing year released and album name
| Title | Year | Peak chart positions | | Album |
| Title | Year | FRA | US Dance | Album |
|---|---|---|---|---|
| "Together" | 2013 | — | — | Non-album promotional single |
| "Bird Machine" (featuring Alesia) | 2013 | — | — | Jeffree's, Vol. 7 |
| "Lunatic" (with Mercer) | 2014 | — | — | Non-album promotional single |
| "Propaganda" | 2016 | — | 35 | Encore |
| "Ocho Cinco" (featuring Yellow Claw) | 2016 | 89 | 26 | Encore |
"—" denotes a recording that did not chart or was not released.

== Other charted songs ==
=== As lead artist ===
List of other charted songs, with chart positions, showing year released and album name
| Title | Year | Peak chart positions | | | | | | Album |
| Title | Year | FRA | CAN | KOR | US Bub. | US Dance | WW | Album |
|---|---|---|---|---|---|---|---|---|
| "Let Me Love You" (R. Kelly Remix) (with R. Kelly) | 2017 | — | — | — | 24 | 11 | — | Non-album song |
| "Butterly Effect" | 2019 | 167 | — | — | — | — | — | Carte Blanche |
| "Quiet Storm" (featuring Zomboy) | 2019 | 199 | — | — | — | 48 | — | Carte Blanche |
| "Recognize" (featuring Majid Jordan) | 2019 | 176 | — | — | — | — | — | Carte Blanche |
| "No More" (featuring Zhu) | 2019 | — | — | — | — | 46 | — | Carte Blanche |
| "Made in France" (featuring Tchami, Malaa and Mercer) | 2019 | — | — | — | — | 50 | — | Carte Blanche |
| "When the Lights Go Down" | 2019 | — | — | — | — | 42 | — | Carte Blanche |
| "Smile" (featuring Bryson Tiller) | 2019 | — | — | — | — | 31 | — | Carte Blanche |
| "Frequency 75" | 2020 | — | 50 | — | — | — | — | Carte Blanche |
| "Please Don't Change" (with Jungkook) | 2023 | — | — | 92 | — | 5 | 46 | Golden |
"—" denotes a recording that did not chart or was not released.

=== As featured artist ===
List of other charted songs, with chart positions, showing year released and album name
| Title | Year | Peak chart positions | Album |
| Title | Year | US Gospel | Album |
|---|---|---|---|
| "Worship" (Asake featuring DJ Snake) | 2026 | 2 | M$ney |

== Guest appearances ==
List of non-single guest appearances, with other performing artists, showing year released and album name
| Title | Year | Other artist(s) | Album |
|---|---|---|---|
| "Slow Down" | 2013 | Yellow Claw, Spanker | Amsterdam Twerk Music |
| "Happiness" | 2020 | Black Motion, Phemza The Kween | N/A |

== Production and songwriting credits ==
| Title | Year | Artist(s) | Album | Credit(s) |
|---|---|---|---|---|
| "Shut It Down" | 2009 | Pitbull, Akon | Rebelution | Producer, programming |
| "Dancehall Queen" | 2009 | Big Ali, Beenie Man, One World | | Composer |
| "Drop" | 2009 | Big Ali, One World | | Composer |
| "Vida 23" | 2010 | Pitbull, Nayer | Armando | Producer, arranger, instrumentation |
| "Government Hooker" | 2011 | Lady Gaga | Born This Way | Bass, drums, keyboard, producer |
| "One More Night" | 2011 | Jordan Knight | Unfinished | Composer, producer |
| "Shake Señora" | 2011 | Pitbull, T-Pain, Sean Paul | Planet Pit | Instrumentation, producer, programming |
| "Promesses" | 2013 | Tchami, Kaleem Taylor | | Bass, drums, keyboard, producer |
| "Sexxx Dreams" | 2013 | Lady Gaga | Artpop | Composer |
| "Do What U Want" | 2013 | Lady Gaga, R. Kelly | Artpop | Composer |
| "Applause" | 2013 | Lady Gaga | Artpop | Composer |
| "Papaoutai" | 2013 | Stromae | Racine carrée | Drums |
| "Worth It" | 2015 | Fifth Harmony, Kid Ink | Reflection | Composer, producer |
| "FIRE" | 2016 | BTS | The Most Beautiful Moment in Life: Young Forever | Composer, producer |
| "Save Me" | 2016 | BTS | The Most Beautiful Moment in Life: Young Forever | Composer, producer |
| "Begin" | 2016 | BTS | Wings & You Never Walk Alone | Composer, producer |
| "Work From Home" | 2016 | Fifth Harmony, Ty Dolla $ign | 7/27 | Composer, producer |
| "Gonna Get Better" | 2016 | Fifth Harmony | 7/27 | Composer, producer |
| "Burn" | 2018 | SayMyName | | Composer, producer |
| "Boss" | 2018 | Mercer | | Composer, producer |
| "Girls Have Fun" | 2019 | Tyga, G-Eazy, Rich The Kid | Legendary | Composer, producer |
| "Revolt" | 2019 | Malaa, Jacknife | | Composer, producer |
| "Ramayama" | 2019 | Don Omar, Farruko | The Last Album | Composer, producer |
| "Amarillo" | 2020 | J Balvin | Colores | Composer, producer |
| "Action" | 2020 | Black Eyed Peas | Translation | Composer, producer |
| "Born Again" | 2020 | Tchami | Year Zero | Composer, producer |

== Remixes ==
| Year | Title | Original artist(s) |
|---|---|---|
| 2012 | "Stress" (DJ Snake & Alesia Trap Vision) | Justice |
| 2013 | "Humain à l'eau" (DJ Snake Remix) | Stromae |
| 2013 | "New Slaves" (DJ Snake Remix) | Kanye West |
| 2013 | "It's You" (DJ Snake Remix) | Duck Sauce |
| 2013 | "Bubble Butt" (DJ Snake Remix) | Major Lazer (featuring Bruno Mars, 2 Chainz, Tyga & Mystic) |
| 2013 | "Stay the Night" (DJ Snake Remix) | Zedd (featuring Hayley Williams) |
| 2014 | "Dirty Vibe" (DJ Snake & Aazar Remix) | Skrillex & Diplo (featuring G-Dragon & CL) |
| 2014 | "Club Goin' Up on a Tuesday" (DJ Snake Remix) | ILoveMakonnen |
| 2015 | "After Life" (DJ Snake & Mercer Remix) | Tchami (featuring Stacy Barthe) |
| 2015 | "How Deep Is Your Love" (DJ Snake Remix) | Calvin Harris & Disciples |
| 2018 | "Made In China" (DJ Snake Remix) | Higher Brothers |
| 2021 | "Dog Eat Dog" (DJ Snake Remix) | YehMe2 (featuring Duke Deuce) |
| 2025 | "Type Dangerous" (The Touch the Soul of the People Remix) | Mariah Carey |

== Music videos ==
List of music videos, showing year released and directors
| Title | Year | Director(s) |
|---|---|---|
| "Turn Down for What" (with Lil Jon) | 2014 | Daniels |
| "Get Low" (with Dillon Francis) | 2014 | Mister Whitmore |
| "You Know You Like It" (with AlunaGeorge) | 2014 | Sammy Rawal |
| "Lean On" (with Major Lazer featuring MØ) | 2015 | Tim Erem |
| "Middle" (featuring Bipolar Sunshine) | 2016 | Colin Tilley |
| "Talk" (featuring George Maple) | 2016 | Emil Nava |
| "Let Me Love You" (featuring Justin Bieber) | 2016 | James Lees |
| "The Half" (featuring Jeremih, Young Thug and Swizz Beatz) | 2017 | Director X |
| "A Different Way" (featuring Lauv) | 2017 | Colin Tilley |
| "Magenta Riddim" | 2018 | Vania Heymann, Gal Muggia |
| "Taki Taki" | 2018 | Colin Tilley |
| "Taki Taki" (Animated version) | 2018 | Jason Tammemagi |
| "Loco Contigo" | 2019 | Colin Tilley |
| "Fuego" | 2019 | Colin Tilley |
| "SG" (with Ozuna, Megan Thee Stallion, and Lisa) | 2021 | Colin Tilley |
