= W&W discography =

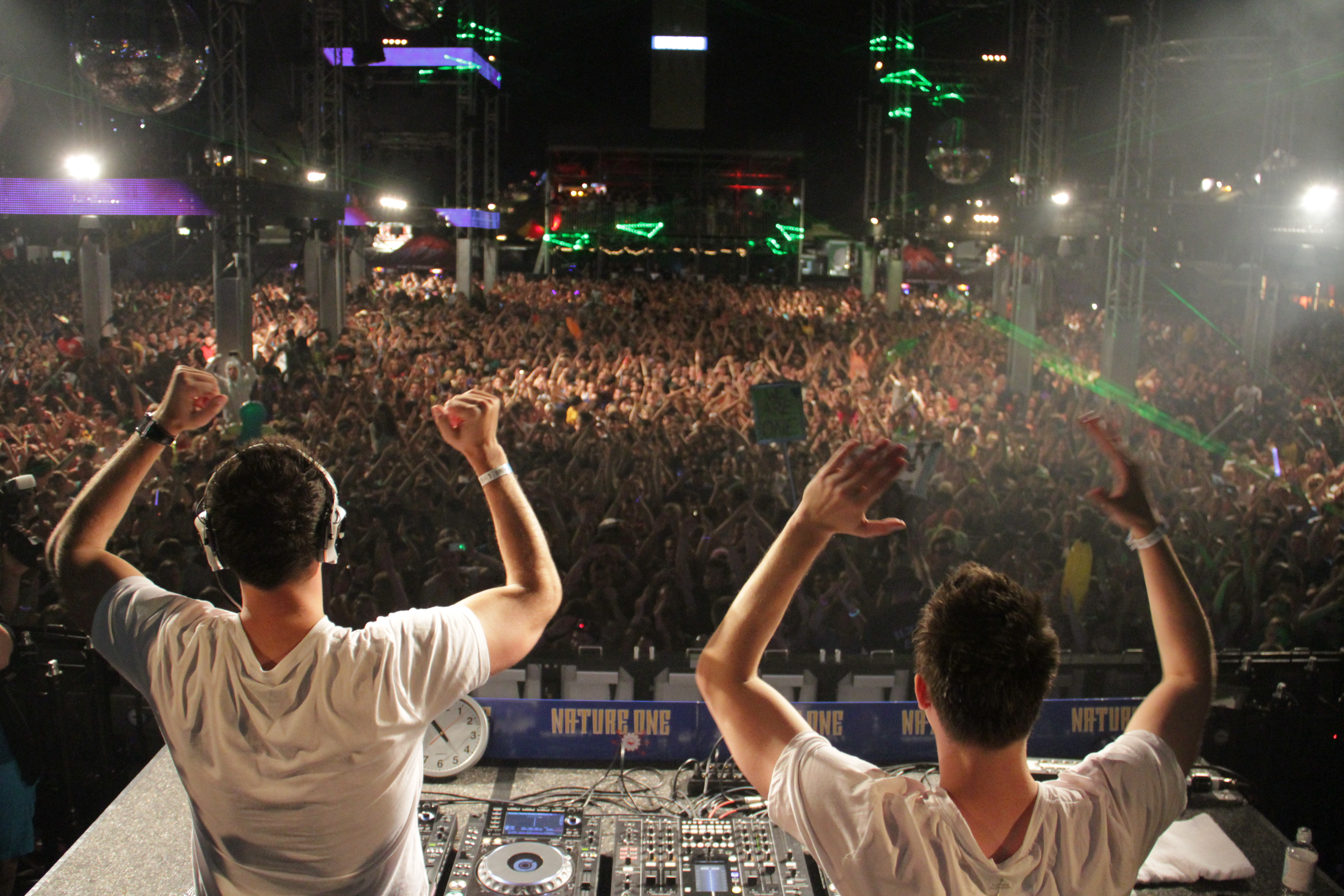
- W&W at Nature One 2013
- Studio albums: 1
- Compilation albums: 2
- Singles: 66
- Remixes: 28

The discography of Dutch DJ duo W&W includes one studio album, two compilation albums, and sixty-five singles, including ten charting singles.

== Albums ==
=== Studio albums ===
List of studio albums
| Title | Album details |
|---|---|
| Impact | Released: September 23, 2011; Label: Armada; Formats: CD, digital download |

=== Compilation albums ===
List of compilation albums
| Title | Album details |
|---|---|
| Mainstage, Vol. 1 | Released: September 21, 2012; Label: Armada; Formats: CD, digital download |
| Bigfoot | Released: April 29, 2015; Label: Avex Music; Formats: CD, digital download |

== Singles ==
=== As W&W ===
==== Charted singles ====
List of singles as lead artist, with selected chart positions, showing year released
| Title | Year | Peak chart positions | | | | | |
| Title | Year | NLD | BEL | FRA | GER | SWI | US Dance |
|---|---|---|---|---|---|---|---|
| "Mustang" | 2008 | 63 | — | — | — | — | — |
| "Lift Off!" | 2013 | 82 | — | — | — | — | — |
| "The Code" (with Ummet Ozcan) | 2013 | 94 | — | — | — | — | — |
| "Jumper" (with Hardwell) | 2013 | — | — | 141 | — | — | — |
| "Bigfoot" | 2014 | 27 | 75 | 135 | 74 | 61 | 44 |
| "Waves" (vs. Dimitri Vegas & Like Mike) | 2014 | — | 7 | — | — | — | — |
| "Don't Stop the Madness" (with Hardwell featuring Fatman Scoop) | 2014 | — | 98 | — | — | — | — |
| "Arcade" (vs. Dimitri Vegas & Like Mike) | 2016 | — | 37 | 161 | — | — | — |
| "Live the Night" (with Hardwell featuring Lil Jon) | 2016 | — | — | 112 | — | — | — |
| "Crowd Control" (vs. Dimitri Vegas & Like Mike) | 2017 | — | 37 | — | — | — | — |
"—" denotes a recording that did not chart or was not released in that territory.

==== Other singles ====
| Title | Year | Notes |
|---|---|---|
| "Eruption" | 2008 | Non-album singles |
| "Countach" | 2008 | Non-album singles |
| "Intercity" | 2008 | Non-album singles |
| "Dome" | 2008 | Non-album singles |
| "Arena" | 2008 | Non-album singles |
| "Chronicles" | 2008 | Non-album singles |
| "Plasma" | 2008 | Non-album singles |
| "The Plan" | 2009 | Non-album singles |
| "Synergy" (with Ummet Ozcan) | 2009 | Non-album singles |
| "Mainstage" | 2009 | Non-album singles |
| "System Overload" | 2009 | Non-album singles |
| "D.N.A" | 2010 | Non-album singles |
| "Alligator Fuckhouse" (vs. Jonas Stenberg) | 2010 | Non-album singles |
| "Manhattan" | 2010 | Non-album singles |
| "Alpha" | 2010 | Non-album singles |
| "Saturn" (vs. Leon Bolier) | 2010 | Non-album singles |
| "Break the Rules" (vs. Ben Gold) | 2010 | Non-album singles |
| "Nexgen" | 2010 | Non-album singles |
| "Impact" | 2011 | Impact |
| "AK-47" | 2011 | Impact |
| "Phantom" (with Wezz Devall) | 2011 | Impact |
| "Three O'Clock" (featuring Ana Criado) | 2011 | Impact |
| "Beta" | 2011 | Impact |
| "Twist" (with Mark Sixma) | 2011 | Non-album singles |
| "Nowhere to Go" (featuring Bree) | 2011 | Non-album singles |
| "Invasion" (ASOT 550 Anthem) | 2012 | Mainstage Volume 1 |
| "Shotgun" | 2012 | Mainstage Volume 1 |
| "Summer" (with Jochen Miller) | 2012 | Mainstage Music – Best of 2012 |
| "Trigger" (with Marcel Woods) | 2012 | Mainstage Volume 1 |
| "Moscow" | 2012 | Bigfoot |
| "D# Fat" (with Armin van Buuren) | 2013 | Bigfoot |
| "Ghost Town" (Free download) | 2013 | Bigfoot |
| "Thunder" | 2013 | Bigfoot |
| "Rocket" (with Blasterjaxx) | 2014 | Non-album singles |
| "Shocker" (with Headhunterz) | 2014 | Non-album singles |
| "The Dance Floor Is Yours" (with Hardwell) | 2014 | Non-album singles |
| "We Control the Sound" (with Headhunterz) | 2014 | Non-album singles |
| "Rave After Rave" | 2015 | Bigfoot |
| "Bowser" (with Blasterjaxx) | 2015 | Non-album single |
| "The One" (samples "How Will I Know" by Whitney Houston) | 2015 | Mainstage Music – Best of 2015 |
| "Spack Jarrow" (with MOTi; samples "He's a Pirate") | 2015 | Non-album singles |
| "If It Ain't Dutch" (with Armin van Buuren) | 2015 | Non-album singles |
| "How Many" (Vocals by Sophia Ayana) | 2016 | Non-album singles |
| "Meet Her at Tomorrowland" (vs. Dimitri Vegas & Like Mike featuring Da Hool) | 2016 | Non-album singles |
| "Caribbean Rave" | 2016 | Non-album singles |
| "Get Down" (with Hardwell) | 2016 | Non-album singles |
| "Whatcha Need" | 2017 | Non-album singles |
| "Put Em Up" | 2017 | Non-album singles |
| "Chakra" (with Vini Vici) | 2017 | Non-album singles |
| "God Is a Girl" (with Groove Coverage) | 2018 | Non-album singles |
| "Supa Dupa Fly 2018" | 2018 | Non-album singles |
| "Long Way Down" (with Darren Styles featuring Giin) | 2018 | Non-album singles |
| "Arcade Mammoth" (with Dimitri Vegas & Like Mike and Moguai) | 2018 | Non-album singles |
| "Rave Culture" | 2018 | Non-album singles |
| "Ready to Rave" (with Armin van Buuren) | 2018 | Non-album singles |
| "Repeat After Me" (with Armin van Buuren and Dimitri Vegas & Like Mike) | 2019 | Non-album singles |
| "The Light" (featuring Kizuna AI) | 2019 | Non-album singles |
| "Matrix" (with Maurice West) | 2019 | Non-album singles |
| "Ups & Downs" (with Nicky Romero) | 2019 | Non-album singles |
| "Let the Music Take Control" (with Blasterjaxx) | 2019 | Non-album singles |
| "Khaleesi" (with 3 Are Legend) | 2019 | Non-album singles |
| "Tricky Tricky" (with Timmy Trumpet and Will Sparks featuring Sequenza) | 2019 | Non-album singles |
| "Wizards of the Beats" (with Sandro Silva and Zafrir) | 2020 | Non-album singles |
| "Do It for You" (with Lucas & Steve) | 2020 | Non-album singles |
| "Clap Your Hands" (with Dimitri Vegas & Like Mike and Fedde Le Grand) | 2020 | Non-album singles |
| "Comin' to Getcha" | 2020 | Non-album singles |
| "Rave Love" (with Axmo featuring Sonja) | 2020 | Non-album singles |
| "Gold" | 2020 | Non-album singles |
| "Distant Memory" (with R3hab and Timmy Trumpet) | 2021 | Non-album singles |
| "Skydance" (with Axmo featuring Giin) | 2021 | Non-album singles |
| "Greece 2021" (with Martin Jensen featuring Linnea Schössow) | 2021 | Non-album singles |
| "This Is Our Legacy" (with Sandro Silva and Justin Prime) | 2021 | Non-album singles |
| "We're Still Young" (with Nicky Romero featuring Olivia Penalva) | 2021 | Non-album singles |
| "Dynamite (Bigroom Nation)" (with Blasterjaxx) | 2021 | Non-album singles |
| "Moonlight Shadow" (with Groove Coverage) | 2021 | Non-album singles |
| "StarShine (I Don't Want This Night to End)" (with Axmo and Sonja) | 2022 | Non-album singles |
| "Fantasy (Tricky Disco)" (with Harris & Ford and TRIIIPL3 INC.) | 2023 | Non-album singles |
| "Ritmo de la Noche (Vamos a la Playa)" (with AXMO) | 2023 | Non-album singles |

=== as NWYR ===
| Title | Year |
|---|---|
| "Voltage" | 2017 |
| "Dragon" | 2017 |
| "Ends of Time" | 2018 |
| "Time Spiral" | 2018 |
| "Wormhole" | 2018 |
| "The Melody" (with Andrew Rayel) | 2019 |
| "Artificial Intelligence" | 2019 |
| "Mind Control" | 2019 |
| "Heart Eyes" | 2020 |
| "Gamer" | 2020 |
| "Drakaina" | 2020 |
| "Shenron" | 2021 |
| "InterGalactic" (with Flrntn and Darius & Finlay) | 2021 |
| "Year of the Dragon" | 2021 |
| "The Lone Ranger" | 2022 |
| "Zero Gravity" | 2022 |
| "Music In The Air" | 2022 |
| "Cocoon" | 2022 |
| "S1R1" | 2022 |

== Productions ==
=== Production and songwriting credits ===
List of singles as lead artist, with selected chart positions, showing year released
| Title | Year | Artist(s) | Peak chart positions | | Album |
| Title | Year | Artist(s) | UK | SCO | Album |
|---|---|---|---|---|---|
| "Everybody Is in the Place" | 2014 | Hardwell | 63 | — | Non-album singles |
| "Digital Love" | 2017 | Digital Farm Animals featuring Hailee Steinfeld | — | 56 | Non-album singles |
| "We Are One" | 2017 | Hardwell featuring Alexander Tidebrink | — | 56 | Hardwell & Friends Vol. 1 |
"—" denotes a recording that did not chart or was not released.

2009:

- ElSandro – "Style Fusion"
- Quintin vs. DJ Jean – "Original Dutch"
- Ummet Ozcan - "Shamballa"

2011:

- Renvo – "Break Out"
- ElSandro – "Merriment"

2012:

- Renvo – "Energize"
- Jochen Miller – "Zodiac"
- Jochen Miller – "Nevada"
- Quintin – "Toy Story"

2015:

- VINAI – "Techno"
- Dustin Lenji – "Gladiator"

2016:

- Hardwell feat. Jake Reese – "Run Wild"

== Remixes ==
=== As lead artist ===
2008

- M6 – "Fade 2 Black"
- Sied van Riel – "Riel People Know"

2009

- Armin van Buuren – "Rain"
- Leon Bolier and Galen Behr – "Acapulco"
- Ørjan Nilsen – "Artic Globe"

2010

- Aly & Fila – "My Mind Is With You"
- Scott Mac – "Damager 02"
- Svenson & Gielen – "The Beauty of Silence"
- J.O.C. – "Botnik"

2011

- Sean Tyas – "Banshee"
- Marcel Woods – "Champagne Dreams"

2012

- Dash Berlin featuring Emma Hewitt – "Waiting"

2013

- Armin van Buuren featuring Trevor Guthrie – "This Is What It Feels Like"
- Krewella – "Live for the Night"
- Nico & Vinz - "Am I Wrong"

2014

- Gareth Emery featuring Bo Bruce – "U"
- Duke Dumont featuring Jax Jones – "I Got U"
- Dimitri Vegas & Like Mike, Diplo & Fatboy Slim featuring Bonde Do Role & Pin – "Eparrei"
- Mark Sixma – "Shadow"

2015

- Timmy Trumpet – "Freaks"
- Zombie Nation – "Kernkraft 400"
- Axwell Λ Ingrosso – "Sun Is Shining"
- Hardwell featuring Mr. Probz – "Birds Fly"
- DJ Snake and Dillon Francis – "Get Low"
- Stardust - "Music Sounds Better With You"
- Jack Ü (Skrillex & Diplo) feat. Justin Bieber - Where Are Ü Now (w/ Dimitri Vegas & Like Mike)
- Justin Bieber - Sorry
- Ariana Grande - One Last Time
- Kygo - Stole the Show

2016

- The Chainsmokers featuring Daya – "Don't Let Me Down"
- Mike Posner – "I Took a Pill in Ibiza"
- DJ Snake - "Propaganda"
- Dr. Dre and Snoop Dogg - "Still D.R.E."
- Martin Garrix and Bebe Rexha - "In the Name of Love"
- Coldplay featuring Beyoncé - "Hymn For The Weekend"

2017

- Pikotaro – "PPAP"

2018

- Steve Aoki and BTS – "Waste It on Me"

2020

- The Weeknd - "Blinding Lights"
- Alan Walker - "Faded"
- Da Boy Tommy featuring Da Rick - "Candyman" (with Dimitri Vegas & Like Mike and Ummet Ozcan)

2021

- O-Zone - "Dragostea Din Tei"
- Justin Bieber - "Hold On"

=== As NWYR ===
2017:

- Ed Sheeran - "Castle on the Hill"
- Gareth Emery and Standerwick - "Saving Light"
- Calvin Harris feat. Ayah Marar - "Flashback"
- Above & Beyond featuring Richard Bedford - Northern Soul
- Phil Collins - "In The Air Tonight"

==== 2019 ====
- Billie Eilish - When The Party's Over

==== 2020 ====
- Rüfüs Du Sol - Underwater

==== 2022 ====
- Safri Duo - Played-A-Live (The Bongo Song)
