= Taki Taki =

2018 single by DJ Snake featuring Selena Gomez, Ozuna and Cardi B

Single by DJ Snake featuring Selena Gomez, Ozuna and Cardi B

from the album Carte Blanche
- Language: Spanish; English
- B-side: "Magenta Riddim"
- Released: 28 September 2018
- Recorded: 2018
- Genre: Moombahton; reggaeton; dance-pop
- Length: 3:32
- Label: Geffen; Interscope
- Songwriters: William Grigahcine; Selena Gomez; Juan Ozuna; Belcalis Almánzar; Jorden Thorpe; Ava Brignol; Juan Rivera; Max Borghetti; Vicente Saavedra
- Producers: DJ Snake; STANY

DJ Snake singles chronology
"Creep On Me" (2018)	"Taki Taki" (2018)	"Try Me" (2019)

Selena Gomez singles chronology
"Back to You" (2018)	"Taki Taki" (2018)	"Anxiety" (2019)

Ozuna singles chronology
"El Anillo (Remix)" (2018)	"Taki Taki" (2018)	"Imposible" (2018)

Cardi B singles chronology
"Backin' It Up" (2018)	"Taki Taki" (2018)	"Money" (2018)

Music video
- "Taki Taki" on YouTube

"Taki Taki" is a song by French-Algerian DJ and record producer DJ Snake, featuring American singer Selena Gomez, Puerto Rican singer Ozuna, and Dominican-American rapper Cardi B. The song was released on 28 September 2018 as the second single from DJ Snake's second studio album Carte Blanche (2019). It was written and arranged by Bava (aka Ava Brignol), Belcalis Almanzar, Jorden Thorpe, Juan Carlos Ozuna Rosado, Juan G. Rivera, Max Borghetti, Selena Gomez, Vicente Saavedra, William Grigahcine. Ozuna opens the moombahton and reggaetón song in Spanish, while Cardi B and Gomez follow in both English and Spanish.

The song's music video, directed by Colin Tilley, was released on 9 October 2018 and features the four artists and several dancers inside of an ancient temple ruin within a volcano. The single reached number one in sixteen countries (including Argentina, Portugal and Spain), several of which were outside the Hispanophone market. It received a Diamond certification in France, went quadruple Platinum in the US, and won nine music awards. "Taki Taki" made Cardi B the first female rapper to top the Spotify Global chart, extended her record as the first female rapper with multiple billion-streamers on the platform, and made Ozuna the artist with the most one billion-view videos on YouTube.

== Background ==
In July 2018, Cardi B confirmed a collaboration with DJ Snake, Ozuna and a third mystery guest. The following month, Selena Gomez and Cardi B teased a behind-the-scenes look at the song's music video shoot, which was filmed in Los Angeles. On 17 September 2018, DJ Snake announced the release date.

== Composition ==
"Taki Taki", a reference to percussion and drum beats, is classed primarily as a moombahton and reggaetón song. The whistle sample (in the hook) is from Sounds of KSHMR Vol.2. The track runs for three minutes and thirty-two seconds. Ozuna opens the track and provides the chorus, while Cardi B and Gomez follow, performing in English and Spanish.

Lyrically, the song sees Ozuna expressing his style of seduction, inviting his love interest to dance and interpreting what the other is thinking.

Sheet music for "Taki Taki" showed the key of C♯ minor in common time with a fast tempo of 96 beats per minute.

== Music videos ==
From left to right, DJ Snake, Selena Gomez, Cardi B and Ozuna performing on an active lava field.

The music video for "Taki Taki" premiered on 9 October 2018 on DJ Snake's YouTube channel. The video was directed by Colin Tilley. A short teaser clip was shown at the 2018 American Music Awards. The video is set in a post-apocalyptic world. The clip transitions with various landscapes showing the quartet together with a volcano in the background and in the solo scenes. These scenes include DJ Snake out in the storm near a Range Rover, Ozuna in a women-filled pit, Cardi B wearing a black bodysuit covered by a black cape accompanied by dancers, and Gomez in a green monochromatic outfit in the forest. It became the fifth fastest video of 2018 to reach 100 million views, and ranked among the top 10 fastest overall. "Taki Taki" made Ozuna the artist with the most 1 billion-view videos on YouTube, with over seven videos. As of October 2026, the video has received over 2.8 billion views on YouTube.

A pixel video for "Taki Taki" was released on 11 December 2018 on YouTube, which featured animated pixel versions of the four artists dancing in various backgrounds. The lyrics "Booty explota como nagasaki" (Booty blows up like Nagasaki) was criticized by Japanese media for belittling the atomic bombing of Nagasaki and the experience of its survivors. The lyrics were changed to "Booty explota como saki saki" (Booty blows up like saki saki), as requested by Universal Music LLC. This change in the lyrics was made in the official video. In France, the music video were criticized following suggestive scenes, Cardi B's sexual poses and was broadcast with blurring and a warning "Not advised to kids under 10 years old" or without warning.

== Commercial performance ==
In the United States, "Taki Taki" debuted at number one on the Hot Latin Songs, where Ozuna replaced himself at the top with "Te Boté", while bowing at number 27 on the Billboard Hot 100. It eventually reached number 11 on the Hot 100 during its fourth week. It became Gomez's 16th consecutive top 40 entry on the Hot 100, the longest active run of any artist. In the US Latin Airplay chart, it became the first number one for both DJ Snake and Gomez, the eighth for Ozuna and third for Cardi B.

In addition, "Taki Taki" reached number one in Argentina, Bolivia, Colombia, the Dominican Republic, El Salvador, Greece, Guatemala, Honduras, Israel, Nicaragua, Panama, Peru, Portugal, Spain and Venezuela; the song also reached the top 10 in Belgium, Canada, Chile, Costa Rica, the Czech Republic, Denmark, Ecuador, France, Germany, Hungary, Italy, Malaysia, the Netherlands, Paraguay, the Philippines, Romania, Singapore, Slovakia, Sweden and Switzerland; as well as the top 20 in Austria, Finland, Ireland, Lebanon, New Zealand, Norway, the United Kingdom and the United States.

The song had a strong international impact, reaching the top of the Spotify Global 50 chart where it has stayed for over four weeks. This made Cardi B the first female rapper to achieve such a feat. It became DJ Snake's third song to reach a billion streams on Spotify, as well as Cardi's third and Gomez's and Ozuna's first. Cardi B extended her record as the first female rapper with multiple billion-streamers, until being surpassed by black females rappers Nicki Minaj (7 songs) and Doja Cat (8 songs). As of November 2018, the song has reached number one on the official charts of 15 countries and the top 10 of 33 countries around the world.

In France, the song debuted at number thirteen on September 26, 2018, becoming for three of four artists the highest-debut since Gomez's own solo song "Good For You", served as the lead single from her second album Revival, which debuted at number 14. Several weeks later and after Christmas time, the song peaked at number 2 on January 5, 2019, blocked by "Tout Oublier" by Belgian artist Angèle becoming DJ Snake's sixth top ten, Gomez's third, Cardi B's second and last top ten and Ozuna's first top ten.

Although it failed to peak atop, the single is currently certified diamond in France and spent 57 weeks, becoming Ozuna, Gomez's and Cardi B longest-running song and DJ Snake second longest running song after "Loco Contigo".

== Live performances ==
Ozuna and Cardi B performed the song together live for the first time at the Dominican Republic's Electric Paradise Festival on 22 December 2018. Ozuna also performed the song at the 2019 Premios Lo Nuestro. Ozuna featured the song during his headlining set and livestreamed performance at the Viña Del Mar International Song Festival, in Valparaíso, Chile, on 28 February 2020. He also performed the song during the Celebrating America inauguration special in 2021.

== Awards and nominations ==
Year	Award	Category	Result	Ref.
2019	Billboard Music Awards	Top Latin Song	Nominated	
2019	Billboard Music Awards	Top Dance/Electronic Song	Nominated	
2019	Billboard Latin Music Awards	Hot Latin Song of the Year	Nominated	
2019	Billboard Latin Music Awards	Hot Latin Song of the Year, Vocal Event	Nominated	
2019	Billboard Latin Music Awards	Digital Song of the Year	Nominated	
2019	El Premio ASCAP	Winning Song	Won	
2019	iHeartRadio Music Awards	Best Music Video	Nominated	
2019	iHeartRadio Remix Awards	Best Remix in Latin	Nominated	
2019	MTV Video Music Awards	Best Dance	Nominated	
2019	Latin American Music Awards	Song of the Year	Won	
2019	Latin American Music Awards	Favorite Song — Urban	Won	
2019	Lo Nuestro Awards	Crossover Collaboration of the Year	Won	
2019	LOS40 Music Awards	LOS40 Global Show Award	Nominated	
2019	MTV Millennial Awards	Music-ship of the Year	Won	
2019	MTV Millennial Awards Brazil	Global Hit	Nominated	
2019	NRJ DJ Awards	Club Hit of the Year	Nominated	
2019	Premios Juventud	This Is a BTS (Best Behind the Scenes)	Won	
2019	Prêmio Jovem Brasileiro	Me Gusta	Nominated	
2019	Tu Música Urban Awards	Urban Pop Song	Nominated	
2020	BMI Latin Awards	Contemporary Latin Song of the Year	Won	
2020	BMI Latin Awards	Most-Performed Songs of the Year	Won	

== Track listing ==
- Digital download
1. "Taki Taki" – 3:32
- CD single
1. "Taki Taki" – 3:33
2. "Magenta Riddim" – 3:15

== Charts ==
=== Weekly charts ===
Chart (2018–2020)	Peak position
Argentina (Argentina Hot 100)	1
Australia (ARIA)	24
Australia Dance (ARIA)	6
Austria (Ö3 Austria Top 40)	13
Belgium (Ultratop 50 Flanders)	15
Belgium (Ultratop 50 Wallonia)	6
Belgium Dance (Ultratop Wallonia)	8
Bolivia (Monitor Latino)	9
Brazil (Top 100 Brasil)	63
Bulgaria (PROPHON)	4
Canada Hot 100 (Billboard)	7
Canada CHR/Top 40 (Billboard)	30
Chile (Monitor Latino)	2
CIS Airplay (TopHit)	60
Colombia (National-Report)	6
Costa Rica (Monitor Latino)	4
Croatia International Airplay (HRT)	24
Czech Republic Singles Digital (ČNS IFPI)	8
Denmark (Tracklisten)	8
Dominican Republic (Monitor Latino)	1
Ecuador (National-Report)	7
El Salvador (Monitor Latino)	1
Euro Digital Songs (Billboard)	10
Finland (Suomen virallinen lista)	11
France (SNEP)	2
Germany (GfK)	8
Greece (IFPI)	16
Guatemala (Monitor Latino)	23
Honduras (Monitor Latino)	11
Hungary (Dance Top 40)	6
Hungary (Single Top 40)	7
Hungary (Stream Top 40)	2
Ireland (IRMA)	16
Italy (FIMI)	2
Japan Hot 100 (Billboard)	97
Lebanon (Lebanese Top 20)	18
Lithuania (AGATA)	7
Luxembourg Digital Songs (Billboard)	9
Malaysia (RIM)	6
Mexico (Mexico Airplay)	29
Netherlands (Dutch Top 40)	4
Netherlands (Single Top 100)	3
New Zealand (Recorded Music NZ)	12
Nicaragua (Monitor Latino)	1
Norway (VG-lista)	15
Panama (Monitor Latino)	1
Paraguay (Monitor Latino)	2
Peru (Monitor Latino)	7
Portugal (AFP)	1
Puerto Rico (Monitor Latino)	3
Romania (Airplay 100)	1
Scottish Singles Sales (Official Charts)	38
Singapore (RIAS)	3
Slovakia Airplay (ČNS IFPI)	49
Slovakia Singles Digital (ČNS IFPI)	5
Slovenia (SloTop50)	37
Spain (Promusicae)	1
Sweden (Sverigetopplistan)	10
Switzerland (Schweizer Hitparade)	3
UK Singles (Official Charts)	15
UK Dance (Official Charts)	3
US Billboard Hot 100	11
US Dance Club Songs (Billboard)	14
US Hot Dance/Electronic Songs (Billboard)	2
US Hot Latin Songs (Billboard)	1
US Latin Airplay (Billboard)	1
US Pop Airplay (Billboard)	17
US Rhythmic Airplay (Billboard)	11
Venezuela (Monitor Latino)	1

=== Monthly charts ===
Chart (2018)	Peak position
Argentina (CAPIF)	1
Brazil Streaming (ABPD)	49

=== Year-end charts ===
Chart (2018)	Position
Bolivia (Monitor Latino)	92
Dominican Republic Streaming (Monitor Latino)	91
Ecuador (Monitor Latino)	76
El Salvador (Monitor Latino)	65
France (SNEP)	69
Guatemala (Monitor Latino)	78
Honduras (Monitor Latino)	59
Hungary (Dance Top 40)	79
Hungary (Stream Top 40)	29
Italy (FIMI)	79
Netherlands (Dutch Top 40)	62
Netherlands (Single Top 100)	51
Nicaragua (Monitor Latino)	43
Panama (Monitor Latino)	70
Paraguay (Monitor Latino)	71
Peru (Monitor Latino)	81
Portugal (AFP)	34
Romania (Airplay 100)	86
Spain (PROMUSICAE)	51
Switzerland (Schweizer Hitparade)	59
US Hot Dance/Electronic Songs (Billboard)	11
US Hot Latin Songs (Billboard)	15
Chart (2019)	Position
Argentina (Monitor Latino)	18
Bolivia (Monitor Latino)	4
Canada (Canadian Hot 100)	38
Chile (Monitor Latino)	12
Colombia (Monitor Latino)	36
Costa Rica (Monitor Latino)	15
Ecuador (Monitor Latino)	11
El Salvador (Monitor Latino)	26
France (SNEP)	45
Germany (Official German Charts)	84
Guatemala (Monitor Latino)	12
Honduras (Monitor Latino)	8
Hungary (Dance Top 40)	11
Italy (FIMI)	82
Nicaragua (Monitor Latino)	19
Panama (Monitor Latino)	6
Paraguay (Monitor Latino)	12
Peru (Monitor Latino)	5
Portugal (AFP)	68
Romania (Airplay 100)	11
Spain (PROMUSICAE)	64
Switzerland (Schweizer Hitparade)	51
Uruguay (Monitor Latino)	52
US Billboard Hot 100	57
US Hot Dance/Electronic Songs (Billboard)	2
US Hot Latin Songs (Billboard)	2
US Latin Airplay (Billboard)	5
US Mainstream Top 40 (Billboard)	49
US Rhythmic (Billboard)	41
Venezuela (Monitor Latino)	4
Chart (2020)	Position
Hungary (Dance Top 40)	40

=== Decade-end charts ===
Chart (2010–2019)	Position
US Hot Dance/Electronic Songs (Billboard)	9
US Hot Latin Songs (Billboard)	16

== Certifications ==
Region	Certification	Certified units/sales
Australia (ARIA)	3× Platinum	210,000^{‡}
Austria (IFPI Austria)	Platinum	30,000^{‡}
Belgium (BRMA)	Platinum	40,000^{‡}
Brazil (Pro-Música Brasil)	4× Diamond	640,000^{‡}
Canada (Music Canada)	6× Platinum	480,000^{‡}
Denmark (IFPI Danmark)	Platinum	90,000^{‡}
France (SNEP)	Diamond	333,333^{‡}
Germany (BVMI)	Platinum	400,000^{‡}
Italy (FIMI)	2× Platinum	100,000^{‡}
Mexico (AMPROFON)	3× Platinum+Gold	210,000^{‡}
New Zealand (RMNZ)	2× Platinum	60,000^{‡}
Norway (IFPI Norway)	2× Platinum	120,000^{‡}
Poland (ZPAV)	3× Platinum	150,000^{‡}
Portugal (AFP)	3× Platinum	30,000^{‡}
Spain (Promusicae)	4× Platinum	240,000^{‡}
United Kingdom (BPI)	Platinum	600,000^{‡}
United States (RIAA)	4× Platinum	4,000,000^{‡}
^{‡} Sales+streaming figures based on certification alone.

== Release history ==
Region	Date	Format	Label	Ref.
Various	28 September 2018	Digital download; streaming	Geffen	
Italy	12 October 2018	Contemporary hit radio	Universal	
United Kingdom	19 October 2018	Contemporary hit radio	Universal	
United States	6 November 2018	Contemporary hit radio	Interscope	
Germany	30 November 2018	CD single	Geffen	

== See also ==
- List of Airplay 100 number ones of the 2010s
- List of Billboard Hot Latin Songs and Latin Airplay number ones of 2018
- List of Billboard Hot Latin Songs and Latin Airplay number ones of 2019
- List of number-one singles of 2018 (Spain)
- List of Billboard Argentina Hot 100 number-one singles of 2018
- List of airplay number-one hits of the 2010s (Argentina)
