= Run It =

Run It may refer to:

- "Run It" (DJ Snake song), a song from the 2021 film Shang-Chi and the Legend of the Ten Rings
- "Run It" (Stray Kids song), from the EP This & That (2026)
- "Run It!", a song by Chris Brown
- "Run It", a song by Fitz and the Tantrums from their self-titled album
- "Run It", a song by Jelly Roll from the 2024 film Sonic the Hedgehog 3
