= You Are My High =

2000 song by Demon & 2021 song by DJ Snake

Single by Demon vs. Heartbreaker

from the EP You Are My High
- Released: 16 January 2000
- Recorded: 1999
- Genre: French house
- Length: 3:47; 5:28 (extended version)
- Label: 20000st Records; Small
- Songwriters: Demon; Heartbreaker; Charlie Wilson; Johnsye Andrea Smith; Ronnie Wilson
- Producers: Demon, Heartbreaker

Demon singles chronology
"Midnight Funk" (1999)	"You Are My High" (2000)	"Don't Make Me Cry" (2002)

"You Are My High" is a song originally released in 2000 by French electronic music producer Demon. DJ Snake later released a remix version that soared in popularity on 28 July 2021. This version was written by Charlie Wilson, Johnsye Andrea Smith, Ronnie Wilson and DJ Snake, and produced by the latter.

== Composition ==
"You Are My High" by Demon and Heartbreaker samples the songs "You Are My High" and "Oops Up Side Your Head" by American funk band the Gap Band, and merges elements of "traditional dance music, classic R&B and funk."

== You Are My High ==
"You Are My High"

Single by DJ Snake

from the album Nomad
- Released: 28 July 2021
- Genre: R&B; funk; trap
- Length: 3:00; 3:30 (with Future)
- Label: Interscope
- Songwriters: William Grigahcine; Charlie Wilson; Johnsye Andrea Smith; Ronnie Wilson
- Producers: Jeremie Mondon, DJ Snake

DJ Snake singles chronology
"Ring the Alarm" (2021)	"You Are My High" (2021)	"Run It" (2021)

DJ Snake's version was produced with Malaa in July 2021. It also marks their second collaboration since "Selfish Love" with Selena Gomez in March, and his first solo release since "Trust Nobody" in summer 2020.

=== Credits and personnel ===
Credits adapted from AllMusic.

- DJ Snake – producer, primary artist, composer, programming
- DJ Mercer – mixing
- Johnsye Andrea Smith – composer
- Charlie Wilson – composer
- Ronnie Wilson – composer

=== Charts ===
==== Weekly charts ====
Weekly chart performance for "You Are My High"
Chart (2021)	Peak position
France (SNEP)	121
New Zealand Hot Singles (RMNZ)	22
US Hot Dance/Electronic Songs (Billboard)	6

==== Year-end charts ====
2021 year-end chart performance for "You Are My High"
Chart (2021)	Position
US Hot Dance/Electronic Songs (Billboard)	24

2022 year-end chart performance for "You Are My High"
Chart (2022)	Position
US Hot Dance/Electronic Songs (Billboard)	56

=== Certifications ===
Certifications for "You Are My High"
Region	Certification	Certified units/sales
Australia (ARIA)	Gold	35,000^{‡}
Brazil (Pro-Música Brasil)	Platinum	40,000^{‡}
Canada (Music Canada)	Gold	40,000^{‡}
France (SNEP)	Gold	100,000^{‡}
New Zealand (RMNZ)	Platinum	30,000^{‡}
United Kingdom (BPI)	Silver	200,000^{‡}
^{‡} Sales+streaming figures based on certification alone.

=== Release history ===
Release history for "You Are My High"
Region	Date	Format	Label	Ref.
Various	28 July 2021	Digital download; streaming	Interscope	
