= Demon (musician) =

French electronic music producer (born 1977)

- Also known as: DJ Demon
- Born: Jérémie Mondon; 1977 (age 48–49); Paris, France
- Genres: French house, house
- Occupations: Disc jockey, record producer
- Years active: 1997–present
- Label: 20000ST
- Website: helpyourself.fr/artists/demon

Jérémie Mondon (French pronunciation: [ʒeʁemi mɔ̃dɔ̃]), known by his stage name Demon, is a French electronic music producer, born in 1977 in Paris. His music comes under the genre known as French touch.

== Music career ==
The start of Demon's career was particularly influenced by the hip hop movement and artists such as Wu-Tang Clan, Nas, Mobb Deep and A Tribe Called Quest. These artists heavily influenced his first recordings and he still has close ties to rap music, as he produces music for French rappers. Soon after his spell with hip-hop he joined the French electronic scene.

In 1997, he created the label 20000ST, in order to produce his first EP, A-Typique. At 22, he signed for Sony record label and recorded his first studio album, Midnight Funk, considered by critics as one of the classic albums of French touch. Several thousand copies of his single, You Are My High, have been sold and the song is being played in clubs worldwide. Major artists within French touch such as Daft Punk, Mr. Oizo, Etienne de Crécy and Matthew Herbert, have asked him to remix their work.

He then decided to explore other avenues in music, and brought out his album, Music That You Wanna Hear, which mixes electronic music and R&B. The album was recognised by critics, and it even fought against the declining CD industry. Demon later explained in an interview that this experience shaped his understanding of music production and the music industry in general.

== Audiovisual components ==
Through drawing upon the diverse musical genres that he had explored, Demon has developed his audio-visual personality; in particular through his work with the French graphics studio H5. You will often see clients in many of his videos. His well-known videos include:

- You Are My High: This is a video wherein a man and a woman are kissing throughout the clip – the video was up for nomination in the Victoires de la musique, as well as the MTV Music Awards.
- Happy Therapy : The designer Ora-ito and the photographer and cinematographer Arno Bani direct the video. It consists of an interplay of 3D shapes, including the faces of the designer Ora-ito and the actress Vahina Giocante.
- Happy Therapy, ARI Remix : Directed by Arno Bani and Demon. The breakdancing world champion B-Boy Junior shows off his talent in this video.
- In the Park : This clip includes the actress Mylene Jamponoi and B-Boy Junior along with his breakdancing crew Wanted posse.

== Productions ==
He wrote and produced in 2010 the soundtrack for the video, De l'encre, directed by the artists in the group La Rumeur.

He directed the tracks for a number of rappers such as Booba, La Rumeur, 113, etc.

== Discography ==
=== Albums ===
- 2000 : Midnight Funk (20000st Records)
- 2001 : Branding (remix compilation) (20000st Records)
- 2002 : Wuz (with Alex Gopher) (Everlasting Records)
- 2004 : Music That You Wanna Hear (Small, 20000st Records)

=== Singles and EPs ===
- 1997: "A-Typique" (20000st Records)
- 1998: "Electronic Boogie" (20000st Records)
- 1998: "Regulate" (20000st Records)
- 1998: "Elektra" (20000st Records)
- 1999: "Lil'Fuck" (Remix 1) (20000st Records)
- 1999: "Lil'Fuck" (Remix 2)(20000st Records)
- 1999: "Midnight Funk" (20000st Records)
- 2000: "Regulate" (20000st Records)
- 2000: "You Are My High" (feat. Heartbreaker) (20000st Records)
- 2001: "You Are My High" (feat. Heartbreaker) (20000st Records)
- 2002: "Don't Make Me Cry" (20000st Records)
- 2003: "In the Park" (20000st Records)
- 2007: "Smiley® – Happy Therapy" (Help Yourself)
- 2010: "I Think" (Help Yourself)
