= Fuego (DJ Snake, Sean Paul and Anitta song) =

Single by DJ Snake, Sean Paul and Anitta featuring Tainy

from the album Carte Blanche
- Language: English; Spanish
- English title: "Fire"
- Released: 26 July 2019
- Genre: Latin; reggaeton; dancehall
- Length: 3:15
- Label: DJ Snake Music Productions; Geffen
- Songwriters: William Sami Étienne Grigahcine; Marco Masís; Sean Paul; Michael Sabath; Donny Flores; Christopher Chill; Camilo
- Producers: DJ Snake; Tainy

DJ Snake singles chronology
"Loco Contigo" (2019)	"Fuego" (2019)	"Trust Nobody" (2020)

Sean Paul singles chronology
"Contra La Pared" (2019)	"Fuego" (2019)	"When It Comes to You" (2019)

Anitta singles chronology
"Muito Calor" (2019)	"Fuego" (2019)	"Contatinho" (2019)

Tainy singles chronology
"Callaita" (2019)	"Fuego" (2019)	"Adicto" (2019)

Music video
- "Fuego" on YouTube

"Fuego" (English: "Fire") is a song recorded by French DJ and record producer DJ Snake, Jamaican dancehall musician Sean Paul, and Brazilian singer Anitta featuring Puerto Rican record producer Tainy, from DJ Snake's second studio album Carte Blanche, which was released on 26 July 2019. It was simultaneously released as a single.

== Background ==
Anitta took the song to Rock in Rio, a festival that took place from 27 September to 6 October 2019 in Rio de Janeiro, creating a high expectation for the new track, and by unveiling it to the public. She later said about the song : "This song is important to me for a number of reasons. Firstly, DJ Snake is considered one of the greatest DJs of the moment. [...] He is extremely giant, has several hits that the whole Brazil dances, sings, memes, viralizes. [...] And because I have Sean Paul, Sean Paul, he was part of my life story, I grew up listening to Sean Paul."

== Critical reception ==
Katie Stone from EDM.com called the song a "reggaeton smash" endowed with "sultry vocals and an infectious production", and noted that it's "the type of single that will get the dance floors bumping and grinding". In the same way, DJ Mag France, Switzerland & Belgium described "Fuego" as "a new hit crossover that moves away from EDM to better embrace reggaeton and dancehall sounds". Writing for Idolator, Mike Nied compared the release to DJ Snake's 2018 song "Taki Taki".

== Music video ==
First, a lyric video of the track was made. It consists of a colourful lyrical animation video featuring dancers, it was posted on 31 July 2019 through DJ Snake YouTube channel. In her Instagram, Anitta released a short of a choreography and included the name of the DJ, in addition to a countdown, in order to raise hints for an upcoming music video. He posted a teaser on 9 October via his social media, and launched a premiere for the video, which was scheduled for the following day. It was released on 10 October, through his YouTube channel. Shot in Los Angeles, USA, in August 2019, and directed by award-winning Colin Tilley, who worked for Kendrick Lamar, Rihanna, Nicki Minaj and Justin Timberlake, it takes place in a mysterious world, reminiscent of an old circus, "full of maze of mirrors, fire tunnels and threatening forests". In turn, DJ Snake, Sean Paul and Anitta each write their own mini-narrative. DJ Snake is dancing around a dark area where he hangs near to a wolf and intermittently changes his jacket, while Sean Paul sings from inside a tunnel of fire. Anitta appears with several neat models, wiggling and stepping alongside dancers in a water mirror. According to Katie Stone from EDM.com, the video is "set to be as spicy and sexy as the song it accompanies". Katie Bain from Billboard noted that "the lighting makes everyone look sexy". Then, she wrote that the clip has a "slick, shiny effect" which raise the temperature.

== Commercial performance ==
Before having a clip, the song has been streamed over 14 million times on Spotify and the lyric video had over 4 millions of views. The song also entered position 40 in the US Hot Dance/Electronic Songs chart during the week of 10 August, before it even had a clip. The music video, released on 10 October 2019, was also viewed nearly 300,000 times in just over an hour, and 500,000 times in less than two hours after it went online.

== Credits and personnel ==
Credits adapted from Tidal.

- DJ Snake – production, composition, lyrics, mixing, studio personnel
- Tainy – production, composition, lyrics
- Sean Paul – composition, lyrics
- Camilo – composition, lyrics
- Christopher Chil – composition, lyrics
- Donny Flores – composition, lyrics
- Michael Sabath – composition, lyrics

== Charts ==
Chart performance for "Fuego"
Chart (2019)	Peak position
Belgium (Ultratip Bubbling Under Wallonia)	30
Belgium Dance (Ultratop Wallonia)	14
Portugal (AFP)	63
US Hot Dance/Electronic Songs (Billboard)	31

== Certifications ==
Region	Certification	Certified units/sales
Brazil (Pro-Música Brasil)	Diamond	160,000^{‡}
Portugal (AFP)	Gold	5,000^{‡}
^{‡} Sales+streaming figures based on certification alone.
