= In the Dark (DJ Snake and Stray Kids song) =

- Promotional poster

Single by DJ Snake and Stray Kids

from the album Nomad
- Language: English; Korean
- Released: 6 November 2025
- Genre: Synthwave
- Length: 2:59
- Label: DJ Snake; Interscope
- Songwriters: Nicolas Petitfrère; William Grigahcine; Ari PenSmith; Jenna Andrews; Nicholas Audino; Stephen Kirk; Bang Chan; Changbin; Han; Johannes Klahr; Richard Zastenker
- Producers: DJ Snake; Klahr; Liohn

DJ Snake singles chronology
"Bring the House Down" (2025)	"In the Dark" (2025)	"Worship" (2026)

Stray Kids singles chronology
"Ceremony" (2025)	"In the Dark" (2025)	"Do It" / "Divine" (2025)

Lyric video
- "In the Dark" on YouTube

"In the Dark" is a song by French DJ and record producer DJ Snake and South Korean boy band Stray Kids from the former's third studio album, Nomad (2025). It was released as the album's seventh single on 6 November 2025 through DJ Snake Music Productions and Interscope Records.

== Background and release ==
French DJ and record producer DJ Snake first met South Korean boy band Stray Kids in January 2024 at Le Gala des Pièces Jaunes, a charity event organized by Brigitte Macron, the spouse of the president of France Emmanuel Macron. In May 2025, the DJ announced his third studio album, titled Nomad. On 28 October, its track list and release date, 7 November, were revealed; "In the Dark", a collaboration with Stray Kids, appears as the sixth track.

== Composition ==
"In the Dark" is two minutes and 59 seconds long produced by DJ Snake, Klahr, Liohn, who co-wrote with Nicolas Petitfrère, Ari PenSmith, Jenna Andrews, Nicholas Audino, Stephen Kirk, and Stray Kids' in-house production team 3Racha, consisting of Bang Chan, Changbin, and Han. Featured vocals by all Stray Kids members, the song is described as a "chill" and "body-rocking", "vapory" synthwave-influenced track about someone who is chasing love in late-night around town during summer and do not want to "live another day without someone in the dark."

== Credits and personnel ==
- Stray Kids – vocals
  - Bang Chan (3Racha) – songwriting
  - Changbin (3Racha) – songwriting
  - Han (3Racha) – songwriting
- DJ Snake – songwriting, production
- Klahr – songwriting, production
- Liohn – songwriting, production
- Nicolas Petitfrère – songwriting, mixing, mastering
- Ari PenSmith – songwriting
- Jenna Andrews – songwriting
- Nicholas Audino – songwriting
- Stephen Kirk – songwriting
- Pete Adams – immersive mixing

== Charts ==
Chart performance for "In the Dark"
Chart (2025)	Peak position
Guatemala Anglo Airplay (Monitor Latino)	8
Italy Airplay (EarOne)	22
New Zealand Hot Singles (RMNZ)	26
UK Singles Sales (OCC)	69

== Release history ==
Release dates and formats for "In the Dark"
Region	Date	Format	Label	Ref.
Various	6 November 2025	Digital download; streaming	DJ Snake; Interscope	
Italy	21 November 2025	Radio airplay	Universal	
