= Carte Blanche (DJ Snake album) =

Studio album by DJ Snake
- Released: 26 July 2019
- Length: 60:46
- Label: Geffen
- Producer: B Ham; Chizzy; DJ Snake; Eptic; King Henry; Malaa; Mercer; Plastic Toy; Sickdrumz; Tainy; Trackside; Yung Lunchbox; Zomboy

DJ Snake chronology
Encore (2016)	Carte Blanche (2019)	Nomad (2025)

Singles from Carte Blanche
- 1. "Magenta Riddim" Released: 23 February 2018; 2. "Taki Taki" Released: 28 September 2018; 3. "Try Me" Released: 15 March 2019; 4. "SouthSide" Released: 22 March 2019; 5. "Enzo" Released: 24 April 2019; 6. "Loco Contigo" Released: 14 June 2019; 7. "Fuego" Released: 26 July 2019

Carte Blanche is the second studio album by French producer DJ Snake, released on 26 July 2019 through Geffen Records. It is a follow-up to his 2016 debut album Encore.

It includes the singles "Magenta Riddim", "Taki Taki" (featuring Selena Gomez, Ozuna and Cardi B), "Try Me" (with Plastic Toy), "SouthSide" (with Eptic), "Enzo" (with Sheck Wes featuring Offset, 21 Savage and Gucci Mane), "Loco Contigo" (with J Balvin featuring Tyga) and "Fuego" (with Sean Paul and Anitta featuring Tainy), as well as other collaborations with Zhu, Anitta, Gashi, Majid Jordan, Bryson Tiller, Zomboy, Tchami, Malaa, and Mercer.

== Promotion ==
DJ Snake stated on social media on 15 July that he had a "big announcement" to make the following day. On 16 July, he revealed the release date and posted the cover art, a picture of the left corner of the Arc de Triomphe, on top of which he DJed in 2017.

== Track listing ==
Carte Blance track listing
No.	Title	Writer(s)	Producer(s)	Length
1.	"Butterfly Effect"	William Grigahcine	DJ Snake; Stany^{[c]}	3:24
2.	"Quiet Storm" (with Zomboy)	Grigahcine; Joshua Jenkin	DJ Snake; Zomboy; Stany^{[c]}	3:45
3.	"When the Lights Go Down"	Grigahcine	DJ Snake; Stany^{[c]}	3:48
4.	"Recognize" (featuring Majid Jordan)	Grigahcine; Parrish Warrington; Krystin Watkins; Diederik van Elsas	DJ Snake; Trackside; Stany^{[c]}	3:34
5.	"No More" (featuring Zhu)	Grigahcine; Henry Allen; Andrew Jackson; Kennedi Lykken; Ian Kirkpatrick	DJ Snake; King Henry; Stany^{[c]}	2:46
6.	"Made in France" (with Tchami and Malaa featuring Mercer)	Grigahcine; Martin Bresso; Malaa; Nicolas Mercier	DJ Snake; Tchami; Malaa; Mercer	4:11
7.	"Enzo" (with Sheck Wes featuring Offset, 21 Savage, and Gucci Mane)	Grigahcine; Khadimou Fall; Radric Davis; Kiari Cephus; Shéyaa Abraham-Joseph; Coby Rhodes	DJ Snake; Yung Lunchbox^{[c]}; Sickdrumz^{[c]}	4:08
8.	"Smile" (featuring Bryson Tiller)	Grigahcine; Donny Flores; Benjamin Singh-Reynolds; Bryson Tiller; Omar Walker	DJ Snake; Stany^{[c]}; Major Seven^{[c]}; King Bnjmn^{[c]}	3:18
9.	"Try Me" (with Plastic Toy)	Grigahcine	DJ Snake; Plastic Toy	3:18
10.	"Loco Contigo" (featuring J Balvin and Tyga)	Grigahcine; Jose Balvin; Justin Quiles; Michael Stevenson	DJ Snake; Stany^{[c]}	3:05
11.	"Taki Taki" (featuring Selena Gomez, Ozuna, and Cardi B)	Grigahcine; Ava Brignol; Jordan Thorpe; Belcalis Almanzar; Vicente Saavedra; Max Borghetti; Selena Marie Gomez; Juan Carlos Ozuna Rosado; Juan G. Rivera	DJ Snake; Stany^{[c]}; Bart Schoudel^{[v]}	3:32
12.	"Fuego" (with Sean Paul and Anitta featuring Tainy)	Grigahcine; Marco Masis; Sean Paul; Michael Sabath; Flores; Christopher Chill; Camilo	DJ Snake; Tainy; Stany^{[c]}	3:15
13.	"Magenta Riddim"	Grigahcine	DJ Snake; Stany^{[c]}	3:14
14.	"Frequency 75"	Grigahcine; Jacob Osher; Jeremy Fossy; Brendan Long; Reginald Noble; Ramirez Javier Jr.	DJ Snake; Stany^{[c]}	4:26
15.	"SouthSide" (with Eptic)	Grigahcine; Michaël Bella	DJ Snake; Eptic; Stany^{[c]}	4:12
16.	"No Option" (featuring Burna Boy)	Grigahcine; Damini Ogulu; Nicholas Audino; Lewis Hughes	DJ Snake; Stany^{[c]}	3:05
17.	"Paris" (featuring Gashi)	Grigahcine; Labinot Gashi; Brandon Hamlin; Charles Stephens III	DJ Snake; B Ham; Chizzy; Sickdrumz; Stany^{[c]}	3:45
Total length:				60:46

Japanese edition bonus tracks
No.	Title	Writer(s)	Producer(s)	Length
18.	"A Different Way" (featuring Lauv)	Grigahcine; Lindy Robbins; Ed Sheeran; Ilsey Juber; Johnny McDaid; Ryan Tedder; Steve Mac	DJ Snake	3:18
19.	"Made in China" (with Higher Brothers)	Higher Brothers	DJ Snake; Richie Souf	2:51
20.	"Let's Get Ill" (with Mercer)	Mercer; Jermaine Dupri	DJ Snake; Mercer	3:31
Total length:				70:38

Deluxe edition track listing
No.	Title	Writer(s)	Producer(s)	Length
18.	"Loco Contigo" (Remix; featuring with J Balvin and Ozuna and featuring Nicky Jam, Natti Natasha, Darell, and Sech)	Grigahcine; Balvin; Quiles; Stevenson; Rosado; Nick Caminero; Natalia Batista; Darell; Carlos Williams	DJ Snake; Stany^{[c]}	5:41
19.	"Loco Contigo" (Cedric Gervais Remix; with J Balvin and Tyga)	Grigahcine; Balvin; Quiles; Stevenson	DJ Snake; Stany^{[c]}; Cedric Gervais^{[r]}	4:39
20.	"Enzo" (Malaa Remix; featuring Sheck Wes, Offset, 21 Savage, and Gucci Mane)	Grigahcine; Fall; Davis; Cephus; Abraham-Joseph; Rhodes	DJ Snake; YungLunchbox^{[c]}; Sickdrumz^{[c]}; Malaa^{[r]}	4:24
21.	"SouthSide" (Yultron Remix; with Eptic)	Grigahcine; Bella	DJ Snake; Eptic; Stany^{[c]}; Yultron^{[r]}	3:56
22.	"SouthSide" (Riot Ten Remix; with Eptic)	Grigahcine; Bella	DJ Snake; Eptic; Stany^{[c]}; Riot Ten^{[r]}	3:24
23.	"SouthSide" (Sullivan King Remix; with Eptic)	Grigahcine; Bella	DJ Snake; Eptic; Stany^{[c]}; Sullivan King^{[r]}	3:18
24.	"SouthSide" (Teez Remix; with Eptic)	Grigahcine; Bella	DJ Snake; Eptic; Stany^{[c]}; Teez^{[r]}	3:01
25.	"SouthSide" (Ship Wrek Remix; with Eptic)	Grigahcine; Bella	DJ Snake; Eptic; Stany^{[c]}; Ship Wrek^{[r]}	3:18
26.	"Made in France" (Wax Motif Remix; with Tchami and Malaa featuring Mercer)	Grigahcine; Bresso; Malaa; Mercier	DJ Snake; Tchami; Malaa; Mercer; Wax Motif	3:25
27.	"Made in France" (Wuki Remix; with Tchami and Malaa featuring Mercer)	Grigahcine; Bresso; Malaa; Mercier	DJ Snake; Tchami; Malaa; Mercer; Wuki	3:05
28.	"Made in France" (Nitti Grittiacra Remix; with Tchami and Malaa featuring Mercer)	Grigahcine; Bresso; Malaa; Mercier	DJ Snake; Tchami; Malaa; Mercer; Nitti Gritti	3:08
29.	"Frequency 75" (Acraze Remix)	Grigahcine; Osher; Fossy; Long; Noble; Javier	DJ Snake; Stany^{[c]}; Acraze^{[r]}	3:04
30.	"No More" (DeVault Remix; featuring Zhu)	Grigahcine; Allen; Lykken; Jacksona; Kirkpatrick	DJ Snake; King Henry; Stany^{[c]}; DeVault^{[r]}	4:17
31.	"No Option" (Kiya Remix; featuring Burna Boy)	Grigahcine; Ogulu; Audino; Hughes	DJ Snake; Stany^{[c]}; Kiya^{[r]}	3:40
Total length:				113:09

=== Note ===
- ^{^[c]} signifies a co-producer
- ^{^[r]} signifies a remixer

== Personnel ==
Credits adapted from the album's liner notes and Tidal.

- William Grigachine – mixing
- Te Whiti Warbrick – drum programming on "Enzo"
- Yung Lunchbox – programming on "Enzo"
- Bart Schoudel – vocal engineering on "Taki Taki"
- Tarek Okbir – package design
- Miko Goncalves – photography
- Anthony Ghnassia – photography

== Charts ==
=== Weekly charts ===
Weekly chart performance for Carte Blanche
Chart (2019)	Peak position
Austrian Albums (Ö3 Austria)	69
Belgian Albums (Ultratop Flanders)	39
Belgian Albums (Ultratop Wallonia)	23
Canadian Albums (Billboard)	24
Danish Albums (Hitlisten)	14
Dutch Albums (Album Top 100)	23
Finnish Albums (Suomen virallinen lista)	38
French Albums (SNEP)	5
German Albums (Offizielle Top 100)	99
Italian Albums (FIMI)	19
Lithuanian Albums (AGATA)	23
Norwegian Albums (VG-lista)	21
Swedish Albums (Sverigetopplistan)	25
Swiss Albums (Schweizer Hitparade)	27
US Billboard 200	48
US Top Dance Albums (Billboard)	1

=== Year-end charts ===
Year-end chart performance for Carte Blanche
Chart (2019)	Position
French Albums (SNEP)	83
US Top Dance/Electronic Albums (Billboard)	19
Chart (2020)	Position
French Albums (SNEP)	153
US Top Dance/Electronic Albums (Billboard)	11

== Certifications ==
Certifications for Carte Blanche
Region	Certification	Certified units/sales
Brazil (Pro-Música Brasil)	3× Platinum	120,000^{‡}
France (SNEP)	Platinum	100,000^{‡}
Italy (FIMI)	Gold	25,000^{‡}
Mexico (AMPROFON)	Platinum+Gold	90,000^{‡}
New Zealand (RMNZ)	Gold	7,500^{‡}
Poland (ZPAV)	Platinum	20,000^{‡}
Singapore (RIAS)	Gold	5,000^{*}
United States (RIAA)	Gold	500,000^{‡}
^{*} Sales figures based on certification alone.^{‡} Sales+streaming figures based on certification alone.
