= Nomad (DJ Snake album) =

- Digital cover

Studio album by DJ Snake
- Released: 7 November 2025
- Length: 58:01
- Languages: English; Spanish; Korean; Bambara
- Labels: DJ Snake; Interscope
- Producers: Avedon; CSR; DJ Snake; Dr. Chaii; Dillon Francis; Klahr; Liohn; Mr Miyagi; Nömak; Trxggx

DJ Snake chronology
Carte Blanche (2019)	Nomad (2025)

Singles from Nomad
- 1. "Paradise" Released: 16 May 2025; 2. "Reloaded" Released: 23 May 2025; 3. "Patience" Released: 5 June 2025; 4. "Noventa" Released: 2 July 2025; 5. "Something Wrong" Released: 29 August 2025; 6. "Bring the House Down" Released: 10 October 2025; 7. "In the Dark" Released: 6 November 2025

Professional ratings
Review scores
Source	Rating
Rolling Stone UK	4/5 stars

Nomad is the third studio album by French producer DJ Snake. It was released through DJ Snake Music Productions and Interscope Records on 7 November 2025, the first album in six years since Carte Blanche (2019). Announced in May, following his "the Final Show" at Stade de France and its after party at Accor Arena, seven singles supported the album: "Paradise", "Reloaded", "Patience", "Noventa", "Something Wrong", "Bring the House Down", and "In the Dark".

To "build bridges" between musical genres with reggaeton, Middle Eastern street music, baile funk, and hip-hop sounds, Nomad features guest appearances from Amadou & Mariam, J Balvin, Bantu, Bipolar Sunshine, Future, Damian Marley, DJ Snake's alter ego the Outlaw, Peso Pluma, Travis Scott, Stray Kids, and Don Toliver, and includes production from DJ Snake for all tracks, as well as Avedon, CSR, Dr. Chaii, Dillon Francis, Klahr, Liohn, Mr Miyagi, Nömak, and Trxggx. To promote the album, DJ Snake held an exclusive event at Hangar H4, Paris–Le Bourget Airport on 6 November.

== Track listing ==
Nomad track listing
No.	Title	Writer(s)	Producer(s)	Length
1.	"Nomad"	William Grigahcine; Austin Chinemezu Nwamara; Aluna Dewji Francis; Martin Bresso; George Reid	DJ Snake	2:04
2.	"Noventa" (with J Balvin)	José Osorio; Grigahcine; Luis Angel O'Neill Laureano; Kevyn Mauricio Cruz Moreno; Francis Rivera Diaz; Pedro Torruellas; Kyan Angelo Sánchez Claudio; Carliane Tamara Santiago Rodriguez; Sven Grummel; Cesar R Peralta Benabe	DJ Snake; CSR	2:26
3.	"Monte Carlo"	Grigahcine; Grummel; Nicolas Petitfrère; Maxime Le Roux	DJ Snake	6:42
4.	"Company" (with Bantu)	Vincent van den Ende; Grigahcine; Tanaka Sibanda; Philip Kembo; Tinashe Sibanda	DJ Snake; Mr Miyagi; Dr. Chaii; Avedon	2:44
5.	"Paradise" (with Bipolar Sunshine)	Phil Collins	DJ Snake	3:20
6.	"In the Dark" (with Stray Kids)	Petitfrère; Grigahcine; Ari PenSmith; Jenna Andrews; Nicholas Audino; Stephen Kirk; Bang Chan (3Racha); Changbin (3Racha); Han (3Racha); Johannes Klahr; Richard Zastenker	DJ Snake; Klahr; Liohn	2:59
7.	"Something Wrong" (with Don Toliver)	Grigahcine; Simon David Plummer; Martin de la Celle; Caleb Toliver; Te Whiti Warbrick; Donny Flores	DJ Snake	2:22
8.	"Tsunami" (featuring Future and Travis Scott)	Grigahcine; Nayvadius Wilburn; Jacques Bermon Webster II; Petitfrère; Warbrick	DJ Snake	3:19
9.	"Patience" (with Amadou & Mariam)	Damian Marley; Nasir Jones; Amadou Bagayoko; Mariam Doumbia	DJ Snake	3:05
10.	"Bring the House Down" (with Dillon Francis and Trxggx)	Francis; Berge Komorian; Grigahcine	DJ Snake; Francis; Trxggx	3:42
11.	"Reloaded" (with Space Laces)	Space Laces; Tim Skold; John 5; Brian Warner; Grigahcine	DJ Snake; Space Laces	3:48
12.	"Bam Bam" (with Damian "Jr. Gong" Marley)	Grigahcine; Sven Grummel; Marley	DJ Snake	2:37
13.	"Cairo Express"	Grigahcine; Grummel; Petitfrère; Warbrick; Islam Chipsy	DJ Snake	3:18
14.	"Kiki2000"	Ewerton Luiz Da Silva; Washington Luis Gomes de Lima	DJ Snake	2:40
15.	"U Are My High"	Charlie Wilson; Johnsye Andrea Smith; Ronnie Wilson; Wilburn; Warbrick; Stany Roger Kibulu; Grigahcine	DJ Snake; Stany^{[c]}	3:00
16.	"Teka" (with Peso Pluma)	Justin Quiles; Hassan Emilio Kabande Laija; Grigahcine; Petitfrère; Grummel; Jean Rodriguez; Jordan Viviant	DJ Snake	2:43
17.	"Final Fantasy" (with the Outlaw)	Grigahcine; Petitfrère	DJ Snake; Nömak	7:04
Total length:				58:01

=== Notes ===
- ^{^[c]} indicates a co-producer
- "Paradise" contains an interpolation from "Another Day in Paradise", written and performed by Phil Collins.
- "Patience" contains an interpolation from "Sabali", written by Mariam Doumbia, Damon Albarn, and Marc Antoine Moreau, and performed by Amadou & Mariam.
- "U Are My High" contains a sample of "You Are My High", written by Charlie Wilson, Johnsye Andrea Smith, and Ronnie Wilson, and performed by the Gap Band.
- Both "Reloaded" and 'Kiki2000" are stylized in all caps.
- "Patience", "Bring The House Down", "U Are My High" and "Teka" are omitted from vinyl releases.

== Personnel ==
Credits adapted from Tidal.

- DJ Snake – bass, drums, keyboards (tracks 2–4, 7, 11, 13, 14, 17), mixing (2, 5, 9, 11, 16), engineering (2, 7), mastering (2, 11), programming (5, 9, 15, 16), background vocals (15)
- Nömak – mixing (4, 5, 7, 9, 16), mastering (4, 5, 7, 9)
- Vincent van den Ende – bass, drums, keyboards (4)
- Bipolar Sunshine – vocals (5)
- Stray Kids – vocals (6)
- Nicolas Petitfrère – mixing, mastering (6)
- Berge Komorian – mixing, mastering (10)
- Maxime Le Roux – mixing, mastering (14)
- Te Whiti Warbrick – drum programming (15)
- Mercer – mixing (15)
- Stany – programming (15)
- Pete Adams – immersive mixing (16)
- Peso Pluma – vocals (16)

== Charts ==
Chart performance for Nomad
Chart (2025)	Peak position
French Albums (SNEP)	35
US Top Dance Albums (Billboard)	7
