= Mothership Tour =

2011 concert tour by Skrillex

The Mothership Tour
- Tour by Skrillex
- Promotional poster
- Associated album: Scary Monsters and Nice Sprites, More Monsters and Sprites, Bangarang, Voltage
- Start date: September 22, 2011
- End date: December 17, 2011
- Legs: 2
- No. of shows: 50 in North America, 16 in Europe; 66 Total

Skrillex concert chronology
- -; The Mothership Tour (2011)

The Mothership Tour was the first tour by the American electronic music artist Skrillex. The tour had 66 shows, 50 in the United States and Canada, and 16 in Europe. The tour was set to include many guest acts such as the Foreign Beggars, Skream, Benga, Nero, 12th Planet, Diplo, Two Fresh, and Nadastrom.

== Tour dates ==
Date	City	Country	Venue
North America
September 22, 2011	San Diego	United States	Petco Park
September 23, 2011	Las Vegas	United States	Surrender
September 24, 2011	Salt Lake City	United States	Saltair
September 26, 2011	El Paso	United States	Buchanans
September 27, 2011	San Antonio	United States	Rio
September 28, 2011	Dallas	United States	Palladium
September 29, 2011	Houston	United States	Stereo Live
September 30, 2011	New Orleans	United States	Sugar Mill
October 1, 2011	Atlanta	United States	Tabernacle
October 2, 2011	Raleigh	United States	Long Branch
October 4, 2011	Norfolk	United States	Norva
October 5, 2011	Baltimore	United States	Rams Head
October 6, 2011	Washington, D.C.	United States	Fur
October 7, 2011	Richmond	United States	National
October 8, 2011	Philadelphia	United States	Electric Factory
October 9, 2011	Sayreville	United States	Starland Ballroom
October 10, 2011	Buffalo	United States	Town Ballroom
October 11, 2011	Syracuse	United States	Center of Progress
October 12, 2011	Portland	United States	State Theater
October 13, 2011	Burlington	United States	Memorial Auditorium
October 14, 2011	Montreal	Canada	Metropolis
October 15, 2011	Toronto	Canada	Kool Haus
October 18, 2011	Saskatoon	Canada	Tequila
October 19, 2011	Calgary	Canada	Flames Central
October 20, 2011	Edmonton	Canada	EDM Events Centre
October 21, 2011	Vancouver	Canada	Pne Forum
October 22, 2011	Vernon (Cancelled)	Canada	Wesbild Center
October 24, 2011	Spokane	United States	Knitting Factory
October 25, 2011	Seattle	United States	WaMu Theater
October 26, 2011	Eugene	United States	McDonald Theatre
October 27, 2011	Portland	United States	Roseland
October 28, 2011	San Francisco	United States	Warfield
October 29, 2011	Los Angeles	United States	Hard Haunted Mansion
October 30, 2011	Phoenix	United States	Marquee Theater
October 31, 2011	Broomfield	United States	1st Bank Center
November 2, 2011	Lawrence	United States	Liberty Hall
November 3, 2011	St. Louis	United States	The Pageant
November 4, 2011	Memphis	United States	Minglewood Hall
November 6, 2011	Asheville	United States	Orange Peel
November 8, 2011	Bloomington	United States	Bluebird
November 9, 2011	Columbus	United States	LC Pavilion
November 10, 2011	Indianapolis	United States	Egyptian Room
November 11, 2011	Chicago	United States	Congress Theater
November 12, 2011	Chicago	United States	Congress Theater
December 10, 2011	Athens	United States	Georgia Theater
December 11, 2011	Jacksonville	United States	Freebird
December 12, 2011	Tallahassee	United States	The Moon
December 15, 2011	Orlando	United States	House of Blues
December 16, 2011	Tampa	United States	Ritz Ybor
December 17, 2011	Miami	United States	The Filmore
