= Enzo (song) =

Single by DJ Snake and Sheck Wes featuring Offset, 21 Savage and Gucci Mane

from the album Carte Blanche
- Released: 24 April 2019
- Genre: Hip-hop
- Length: 4:08
- Label: Interscope
- Songwriters: William Grigahcine; Khadimou Fall; Kiari Cephus; Shayaa Bin Abraham-Joseph; Radric Davis; Coby Rhodes
- Producers: DJ Snake; Sickdrumz; Yung Lunchbox

DJ Snake singles chronology
"Southside" (2019)	"Enzo" (2019)	"Loco Contigo" (2019)

Sheck Wes singles chronology
"Chippi Chippi" (2018)	"Enzo" (2019)	"Sadio Mane" (2019)

Offset singles chronology
"Clout" (2019)	"Enzo" (2019)	"Let`s Get Married" (2019)

21 Savage singles chronology
"A Lot" (2019)	"Enzo" (2019)	"Monster" (2019)

Gucci Mane singles chronology
"With You" (2019)	"Enzo" (2019)	"Love Thru the Computer" (2019)

Music video
- "Enzo" on YouTube

"Enzo" is a song by French DJ and record producer DJ Snake and American rapper Sheck Wes featuring British-American rapper 21 Savage and fellow American rappers Offset and Gucci Mane. It was released as a single on 24 April 2019, from Snake's second studio album Carte Blanche (2019).

== Promotion ==
DJ Snake shared the cover art on Twitter on 23 April 2019, and said the track would be released the next day.

== Charts ==
Chart (2019)	Peak position
New Zealand Hot Singles (RMNZ)	21

== Release history ==
Region	Date	Format	Label	Ref.
Various	24 April 2019	Digital download; streaming	Interscope	
United States	14 May 2019	Rhythmic contemporary	Interscope	
