= Magenta Riddim =

2018 song by DJ Snake

Single by DJ Snake

from the album Carte Blanche
- Released: 23 February 2018
- Genre: Dancehall; moombahton
- Length: 3:14
- Label: Geffen
- Songwriter: William Grigahcine
- Producer: DJ Snake

DJ Snake singles chronology
"Broken Summer" (2017)	"Magenta Riddim" (2018)	"Gassed Up" (2018)

Music video
- "Magenta Riddim" on YouTube

"Magenta Riddim" is a song by French DJ and record producer DJ Snake. It was released on 23 February 2018, from his second studio album Carte Blanche. The song is written and produced by DJ Snake.

== Composition ==
The song has dancehall tunes and incorporates a number of elements from Indian music.

== Music video ==
The music video was uploaded on 12 April 2018, directed by Gal Muggia and Vania Heymann. It was shot in Ramoji Film City in Hyderabad, India. DJ Snake, who is the representative of the French elite fire force, joined forces with the local firefighters under the leadership of captain Raj, who can't stop dancing and as they ride around town, and companioned demonstrate fire safety techniques, then the neighbors also groove alongside them to the song's beats.

Later, the shortest of the firemen finds out that all the fires that they had extinguished were started by Captain Raj himself with the help of the "magenta riddim" matchstick and gasoline. He had done this so as to extinguish it later and earn a bravery award from the government. The song ends as the shortest fireman is shocked with utter disbelief as the rest of the crew continue dancing.

=== Symbolism ===
The plot of the video, through the firemen, symbolizes corruption, a problem prevalent worldwide and notorious in Indian history. Like the firemen, politicians are well known to create problems and then later solve problems, pretending to be heroes.

The video also mimics Indian film industries, which are known to use excessive VFX and are popular in Indian society, by showing a flying car, a boy being kicked by one of the firemen with so much force that he jumps back to his house, a fireman using excessive water stored in the body to extinguish the fire, etc. The video incorporates suspension of disbelief, just like the films themselves.

As of September 2025, the music video has received over 382 million views.

== Charts ==
=== Weekly charts ===
Chart (2018)	Peak position
Belgium (Ultratip Bubbling Under Flanders)	4
Belgium (Ultratip Bubbling Under Wallonia)	15
France (SNEP)	46
US Dance Club Songs (Billboard)	1
US Hot Dance/Electronic Songs (Billboard)	14

=== Year-end charts ===
Chart (2018)	Position
France (SNEP)	174
US Dance Club Songs (Billboard)	26
US Hot Dance/Electronic Songs (Billboard)	59

== Certifications ==
Region	Certification	Certified units/sales
Brazil (Pro-Música Brasil)	Gold	20,000^{‡}
Canada (Music Canada)	Gold	40,000^{‡}
^{‡} Sales+streaming figures based on certification alone.
