= Loco Contigo =

Single by DJ Snake, J Balvin and Tyga

from the album Carte Blanche
- Language: Spanish; English
- English title: "Crazy for You"
- Released: 14 June 2019
- Genre: Reggaeton
- Length: 3:05
- Label: DJ Snake Music; Geffen
- Songwriters: William Grigahcine; José Osorio; Michael Stevenson; Justin Quiles; Jhay Cortez
- Producer: DJ Snake

DJ Snake singles chronology
"Enzo" (2019)	"Loco Contigo" (2019)	"Fuego" (2019)

J Balvin singles chronology
"Haute" (2019)	"Loco Contigo" (2019)	"Qué Pretendes" (2019)

Tyga singles chronology
"Haute" (2019)	"Loco Contigo" (2019)	"Juicy" (2019)

"Loco Contigo" (Spanish pronunciation: [ˈloko konˈtiɣo]; English: "Crazy for You") is a song by French DJ and record producer DJ Snake, Colombian singer J Balvin, and American rapper Tyga. Written alongside Justin Quiles, it was released on 14 June 2019 by DJ Snake Music Productions and Geffen Records as the sixth single from Snake's second studio album Carte Blanche. The official remix, released 27 December 2019, omits Tyga and is credited to DJ Snake, J Balvin and Ozuna, featuring Nicky Jam, Natti Natasha, Sech, and Darell.

== Charts ==
=== Weekly charts ===
Chart (2019–2020)	Peak position
Argentina Hot 100 (Billboard)	77
Austria (Ö3 Austria Top 40)	13
Belgium (Ultratop 50 Flanders)	9
Belgium (Ultratop 50 Wallonia)	3
Bolivia (Monitor Latino)	8
Canada Hot 100 (Billboard)	54
Colombia (National-Report)	45
Czech Republic Singles Digital (ČNS IFPI)	23
Denmark (Tracklisten)	40
France (SNEP)	1
Germany (GfK)	3
Greece (IFPI)	2
Hungary (Dance Top 40)	3
Hungary (Rádiós Top 40)	19
Hungary (Single Top 40)	11
Hungary (Stream Top 40)	6
Ireland (IRMA)	58
Italy (FIMI)	8
Lithuania (AGATA)	21
Netherlands (Dutch Top 40)	7
Netherlands (Single Top 100)	3
Panama (Monitor Latino)	9
Poland Airplay (ZPAV)	16
Portugal (AFP)	3
Puerto Rico (Monitor Latino)	3
Romania (Airplay 100)	6
San Marino (SMRRTV Top 50)	8
Slovakia Singles Digital (ČNS IFPI)	17
Spain (PROMUSICAE)	8
Sweden (Sverigetopplistan)	40
Switzerland (Schweizer Hitparade)	2
UK Singles (Official Charts)	87
US Billboard Hot 100	95
US Hot Latin Songs (Billboard)	4
US Latin Airplay (Billboard)	1
US Pop Airplay (Billboard)	35
US Rhythmic Airplay (Billboard)	18
Venezuela (Monitor Latino)	5

=== Year-end charts ===
Chart (2019)	Position
Austria (Ö3 Austria Top 40)	42
Belgium (Ultratop Flanders)	40
Belgium (Ultratop Wallonia)	25
France (SNEP)	15
Germany (Official German Charts)	30
Hungary (Dance Top 40)	40
Italy (FIMI)	41
Netherlands (Dutch Top 40)	48
Netherlands (Single Top 100)	21
Poland (ZPAV)	99
Portugal (AFP)	28
Switzerland (Schweizer Hitparade)	16
US Hot Latin Songs (Billboard)	18

Chart (2020)	Position
France (SNEP)	102
Hungary (Dance Top 40)	7
Hungary (Rádiós Top 40)	83
Romania (Airplay 100)	82
US Hot Latin Songs (Billboard)	15

Chart (2021)	Position
Hungary (Dance Top 40)	44

== Certifications ==
Region	Certification	Certified units/sales
Australia (ARIA)	Platinum	70,000^{‡}
Austria (IFPI Austria)	Platinum	30,000^{‡}
Belgium (BRMA)	Platinum	40,000^{‡}
Brazil (Pro-Música Brasil)	Diamond	160,000^{‡}
Canada (Music Canada)	3× Platinum	240,000^{‡}
Denmark (IFPI Danmark)	Gold	45,000^{‡}
France (SNEP)	Diamond	333,333^{‡}
Germany (BVMI)	Platinum	400,000^{‡}
Italy (FIMI)	2× Platinum	100,000^{‡}
Mexico (AMPROFON)	2× Platinum	120,000^{‡}
New Zealand (RMNZ)	Gold	15,000^{‡}
Poland (ZPAV)	2× Platinum	100,000^{‡}
Portugal (AFP)	2× Platinum	20,000^{‡}
Spain (Promusicae)	3× Platinum	180,000^{‡}
United Kingdom (BPI)	Silver	200,000^{‡}
United States (RIAA)	Platinum	1,000,000^{‡}
^{‡} Sales+streaming figures based on certification alone.

== Release history ==
Region	Date	Format	Label	Ref.
Various	14 June 2019	Digital download; streaming	Interscope; Geffen; A&M	
United States	10 September 2019	Rhythmic contemporary	Interscope; Geffen; A&M	

== See also ==
- List of Billboard number-one Latin songs of 2019
