= DJ Snake =

French record producer (born 1986)

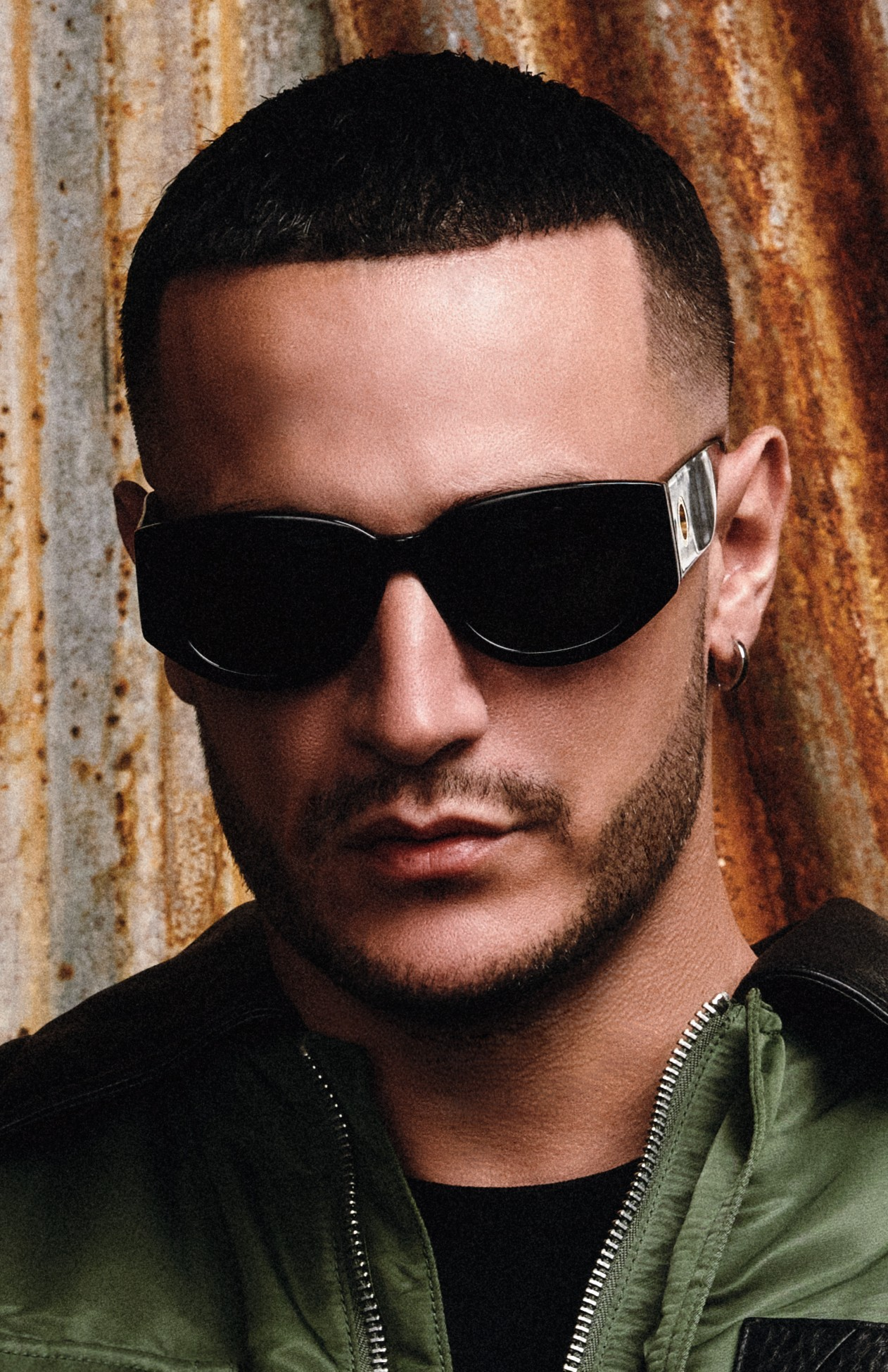
- DJ Snake in 2025

Background information
- Born: William Sami Étienne Grigahcine; 13 June 1986 (age 40); Paris, France
- Genres: EDM; trap; moombahton; dubstep
- Occupations: Record producer; disc jockey; songwriter
- Years active: 2000–present
- Labels: Geffen; Premiere Classe; Starsick; Columbia; Interscope; Mad Decent; Spinnin'; Universal Music; Polydor
- Website: djsnake.com

William Sami Étienne Grigahcine (born 13 June 1986), known by his stage name DJ Snake, is a French record producer. He was first credited with production work on several singles for other artists—including "Shut It Down" by Pitbull and "Applause" by Lady Gaga—before gaining widespread recognition for his 2013 debut single, "Turn Down for What" (with Lil Jon).

Released by Mad Decent, an imprint of Columbia Records, the song peaked at number 19 on the French SNEP singles chart, number four on the Billboard Hot 100, and received octuple platinum certification by the Recording Industry Association of America (RIAA). Furthermore, it was nominated for Best Music Video at the 57th Annual Grammy Awards, and won Top Dance/Electronic Song at the 2015 2015 Billboard Music Awards. DJ Snake's 2015 collaborative single with label boss Diplo, "Lean On" (with Major Lazer featuring MØ), was met with similar success, peaking at number four on the Billboard Hot 100 and peaking atop music charts in nine countries.

His debut studio album, Encore (2016), was supported by the Billboard Hot 100-top five single "Let Me Love You" (featuring Justin Bieber), and peaked at number eight on the Billboard 200. His second, Carte Blanche (2019), peaked at number 48 and was supported by the top 20 single "Taki Taki" (featuring Selena Gomez, Ozuna and Cardi B).

He and Dillon Francis were announced as alternating supporting artists for the summer Mothership Tour 2014 with Skrillex. In March 2018, Billboard named DJ Snake number nine on their 2018 ranking of dance musicians, Billboard Dance 100.

== Early life ==
Grigahcine was born in Paris to Algerian parents and grew up in Ermont, a banlieue district outside Paris, which he describes as a ghetto, though Ermont is not an economically-deprived suburb featuring low-income housing projects. He cites a scene with Cut Killer in the French film La Haine as well as hip-hop artists KRS-One and Cypress Hill as early influences. In his youth, Grigahcine produced graffiti art, earning him the moniker "Snake" because he was able to consistently evade the police. Of his name, Grigahcine says "When I started DJing, everyone called me 'Snake' in my city first, I was like 'DJ Snake, OK let's go for it.' The name sucks, but it's too late now." He started DJing at age 14, and later producing at 19. In his early career, Grigahcine performed at clubs including Le Bains Douches in Paris. In 2005, he met his manager Steve Goncalves, who encouraged Grigahcine to begin creating his own music.

== Career ==
In 2011, DJ Snake produced for Lady Gaga's album Born This Way. This earned him a Grammy nomination for Album of the Year in February 2012. DJ Snake was co-producer for the song "Government Hooker", which was voted best song by Lady Gaga fans after the release of the album. This song was supposed to be released as a single before Interscope Records decided to stop the marketing of the album after its release. He remixed Kanye West's "New Slaves", AlunaGeorge's "You Know You Like It", Duck Sauce's "It's You", Major Lazer's "Bubble Butt" and Junior Senior's "Move Your Feet". In 2013, DJ Snake produced three songs with Paul "DJ White Shadow" Blair on Lady Gaga's album Artpop including "Applause", "Sexxx Dreams", and "Do What U Want". DJ Snake and Dillon Francis were alternating supporting artists on the Mothership Tour 2014 with Skrillex. He performed at the 2015 Coachella Music Festival with guest appearances by AlunaGeorge and MØ, who did vocals on "Lean On" with Major Lazer. "Lean On" and DJ Snake's remix of AlunaGeorge's "You Know You Like It" were both top 10 Shazamed songs from Coachella 2015.

In October 2015, DJ Snake and fellow electronic producer Tchami were injured in a car crash, causing them both to miss a scheduled stop at Toronto's Monster Mash festival. In January 2016, Forbes named him one of their "30 Under 30 In Music" for the year.

=== Standalone singles (2013–2015) ===
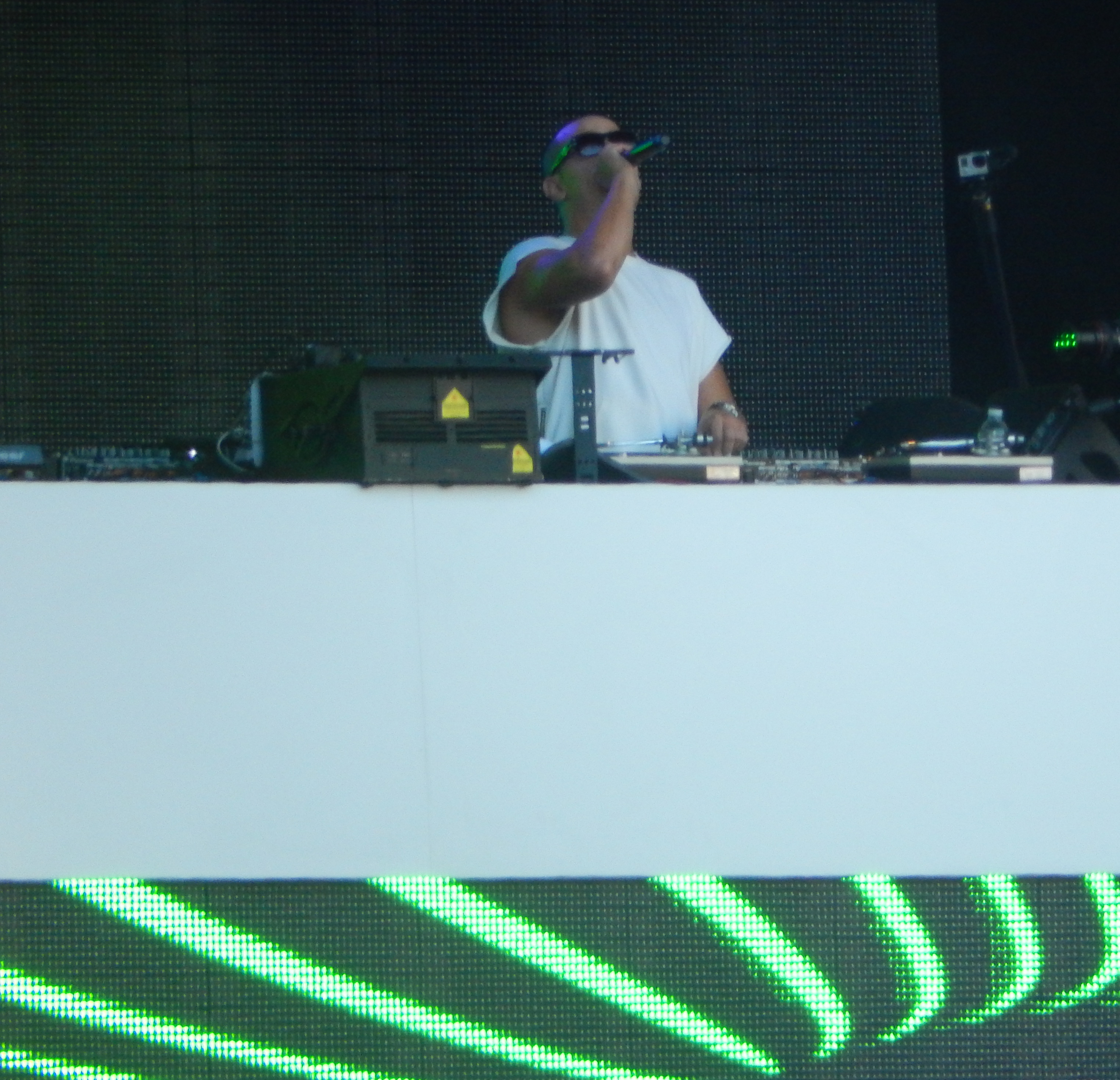
DJ Snake performing in 2014

In December 2013, "Turn Down for What", DJ Snake's collaboration with Lil Jon, was released on Columbia Records. The song was featured in a commercial for the Sol Republic DECK, a wireless speaker, which aired in October 2013. "Turn Down for What" entered the top ten of the Billboard Dance/Electronic chart during the last week of December. In January 2014, the single entered the top 5 on the Dance/Electronic chart and debuted No. 38 on the Billboard Hot 100. The song was certified gold in February 2014 and platinum in March 2014. The song reached the top ten of the Hot 100 in April 2014. The music video for the single was released in March 2014. "Turn Down for What" was nominated for MTV Video Music Awards for Best Direction, Best Art Direction, Best Visual Effects, and the MTV Clubland Award.

In February 2014, DJ Snake and Dillon Francis released "Get Low" on their official SoundCloud and YouTube pages, as the lead single from Francis's debut studio album Money Sucks, Friends Rule. Both "Get Low" and "Turn Down for What" were featured on the Furious 7 motion picture soundtrack. Along with the exposure gained from commercials for Dodge and Taco Bell featuring the song, the inclusion of "Get Low" on the soundtrack helped the song re-enter the Billboard Hot Dance/Electronic chart while DJ Snake re-entered the Billboard Artist 100.

In December 2014, DJ Snake's remix of the AlunaGeorge song "You Know You Like It" was released on Island Records. "You Know You Like It" reached number one on Billboard's Dance/Mix Show Airplay chart and Rhythmic Songs chart in June 2015. It peaked at 13 on the Billboard Hot 100. In November 2015, the song received RIAA double-platinum certification. For the remix, DJ Snake used a fusion of European dance music and hip hop beats. It took him about four hours to write. The collaboration was done via the Internet, with the vocals emailed to DJ Snake, who worked in Paris.

In March 2015, "Lean On", DJ Snake's collaborative track with Major Lazer featuring MØ, was released on Mad Decent, as the lead single from Major Lazer's third studio album Peace Is the Mission. It made it on Billboard's Rhythmic Songs, Mainstream Top 40, Latin Pop Songs, Dance Club Songs, Hot Dance/Electric Songs and Adult Top 40 charts. It peaked at 4 on the Billboard Hot 100. In June, Time magazine named it one of the "Best Songs of 2015 So Far" In September 2015, "Lean On" was named Spotify's global song of the summer. In November 2015, the song surpassed 526 million Spotify plays, making it the service's most streamed song ever. The video for "Lean On" was released in March 2015. It was shot in India and directed by Tim Erem. Amplify magazine named "Lean On" one of "The Best Videos of 2015". In January 2016, the "Lean On" video reached 1 billion views on YouTube, and has since reached over 3 billion.

=== Encore (2015–2017) ===
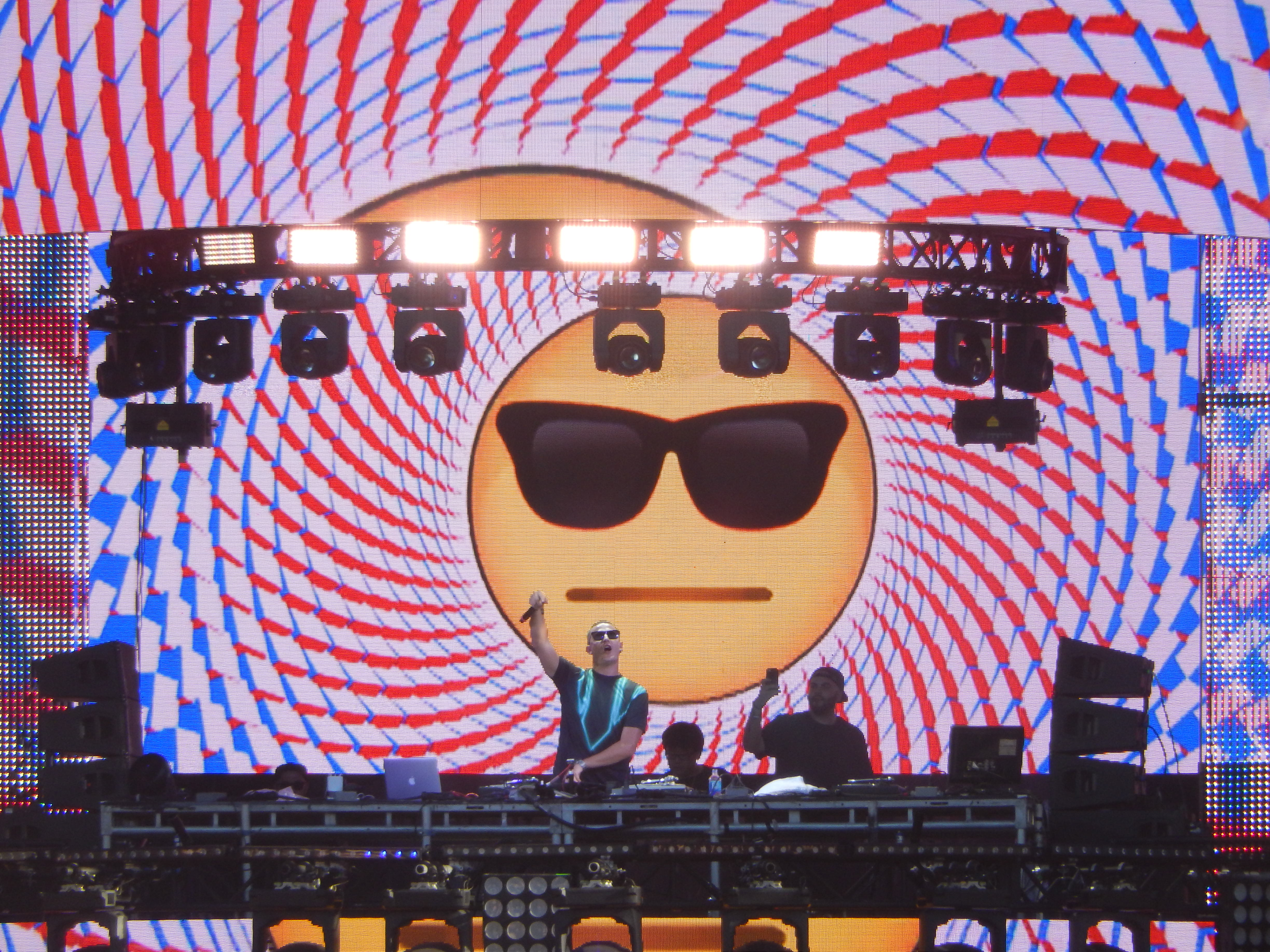
DJ Snake performing in 2015

DJ Snake released his next single "Middle" on 16 October 2015. The song was released by Interscope Records, Mad Decent and Spinnin' Records. It features the vocals from English singer Bipolar Sunshine. The song's accompanying music video premiered on 16 March 2016 on DJ Snake's YouTube account on Vevo.

On 2 June 2016, the single "Talk" was released. DJ Snake had hinted the possibility of releasing new music via Twitter a few days before the single's release. It features vocals from George Maple's song "Talk Talk" that was released in December 2014. The track infuses tropical house sounds and was released by Interscope Records and made available for purchase on iTunes on 10 June 2016. The music video for the song was released on DJ Snake's YouTube account on 11 July 2016. In July 2016, he announced the release of his debut studio album, titled Encore, released on 5 August 2016. "Middle" and "Talk" serve as singles from the album.

On 5 August 2016, with the release of Encore, DJ Snake released the album's third single, "Let Me Love You", featuring the vocals of Canadian singer Justin Bieber. On 2 January 2017, DJ Snake started promoting the album's fourth single "The Half", featuring Jeremih, Young Thug and Swizz Beatz. In fall 2017, DJ Snake performed at the Arc de Triomphe to promote Paris' bid for the 2024 Summer Olympics.

=== Carte Blanche (2018–present) ===
On 23 February 2018, his single "Magenta Riddim" was released. In late August 2018, DJ Snake announced via his social media platforms that he would be releasing a new song later that year. The following month, he confirmed the song would be called "Taki Taki" and it would feature Selena Gomez, Cardi B and Ozuna. The track was released on 28 September 2018.

On 16 July 2019, DJ Snake revealed his second album, Carte Blanche would be released on 26 July 2019. It includes his singles "Magenta Riddim", "Taki Taki", "Enzo" (with Sheck Wes featuring Offset, 21 Savage and Gucci Mane), and "Loco Contigo" (with J Balvin featuring Tyga), on 10 October 2019 Snake released his new single "Fuego" (Featuring Sean Paul, Anitta & Tainy).

DJ Snake is a Vegas resident DJ at Zouk Nightclub and AYU Dayclub at Resorts World. Aaron Musicaro in conjunction with Jared Garcia worked together to get this partnership as a resident DJ.

== Other ventures ==
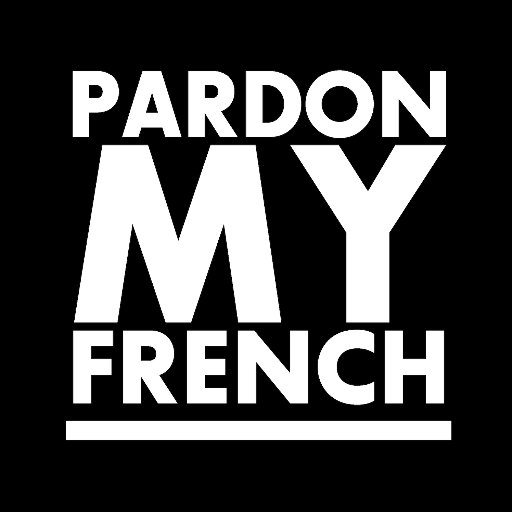
Pardon My French's Logo

=== Pardon My French ===
DJ Snake is currently part of the Pardon My French team, a collective of four French DJs composed of Tchami, Mercer, Malaa and himself. Throughout the year 2016 and into early 2017, DJ Snake was part of the Pardon My French Tour with Tchami and Mercer.

For his special venue at the Accor Hotel Arena (Paris), in 2018 DJ Snake had an exclusive collaboration between his own trademark Pardon My French and the denim brand Levi's. It was composed by the emblematic Levi's trucker jacket sprayed with the DJ's brand. The very limited edition was available as a world exclusive at the Champs-Elysées Levis flagship the day of the venue (24 February 2018) and encountered a huge success.

=== Premiere Classe Records ===
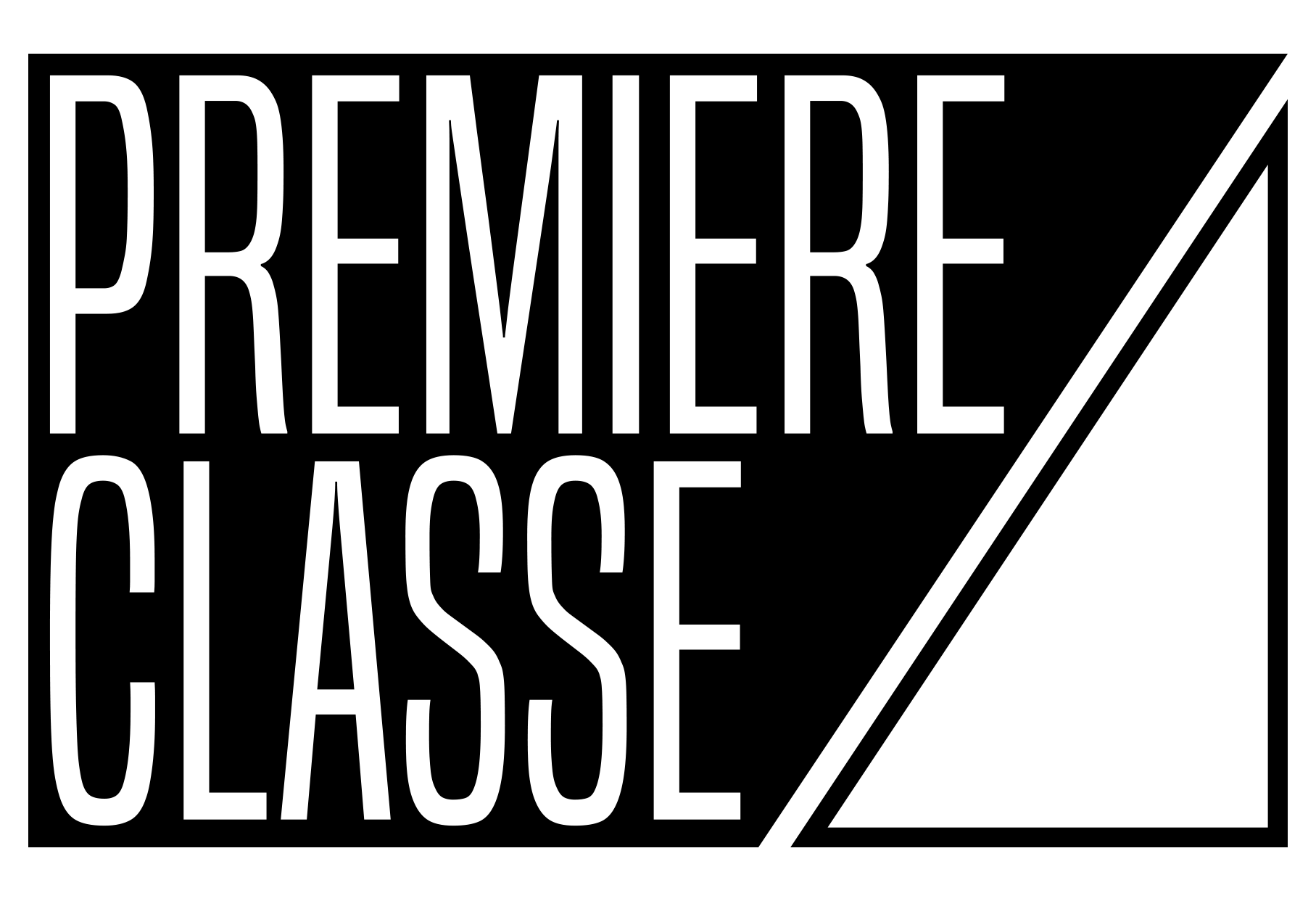
Premiere Classe's logo

In March 2018, he established his own record label named Premiere Classe.

List of Premiere Classe released tracks:

- 4B & Teez – "Whistle"
- Aazar & Bellecour – "Da Vinci"
- Chace – "Never"
- Masayoshi Iimori – "Flow"
- SAYMYNAME – "Burn"
- Gammer featuring Sam King – "Out with the Old"
- Mercer – "Boss"
- Plastic Toy & DJ Snake – "Try Me"
- Malaa featuring Jacknife – "Revolt"
- SQWAD – "Big Ting Vibe"
- Plastic Toy – "Escape"

== Personal life ==
DJ Snake is a fan of French football club Paris Saint Germain. He has passports from both France and Algeria.

== Discography ==
=== Albums ===
- Encore (2016)
- Carte Blanche (2019)
- Nomad (2025)

== Awards and nominations ==
=== Grammy Awards ===
Year	Nominee / work	Award	Result	Ref
2012	Born This Way (as producer)	Album of the Year	Nominated	
2015	"Turn Down for What" (with Lil Jon)	Best Music Video	Nominated	

=== Billboard Music Awards ===
Year	Nominee / work	Award	Result	Ref
2015	"Turn Down for What" (with Lil Jon)	Top Dance/Electronic Song	Won	
2016	"You Know You Like It" (with AlunaGeorge)	Top Dance/Electronic Song	Nominated	
2016	"Lean On" (with Major Lazer featuring MØ)	Top Dance/Electronic Song	Won	
2016	DJ Snake	Top Dance/Electronic Artist	Nominated	
2017	DJ Snake	Top Dance/Electronic Artist	Nominated	
2017	"Let Me Love You" (featuring Justin Bieber)	Top Dance/Electronic Song	Nominated	

=== Berlin Music Video Awards ===
The Berlin Music Video Award is an international festival that promotes the art of music videos.

Year	Nominee/work	Award	Result	Ref.
2019	MAGENTA RIDDIM	Best Concept	Nominated	
2023	Disco Maghreb	Best Editor	Nominated	
2025	Patience (Sabali)	Best Narrative	Won	
2026	SOMETHING WRONG	Best AI	Nominated	

=== Denmark GAFFA Awards ===
Delivered since 1991, the GAFFA Awards are a Danish award that rewards popular music by the magazine of the same name.

Year	Nominee / work	Award	Result	Ref.
2015	Lean On	Best Foreign Song	Won	

=== Electronic Music Awards ===
Year	Nominee / work	Award	Result	Ref
2017	"Let Me Love You"	Single of the Year	Nominated	

=== iHeartRadio Music Awards ===
Year	Nominee / work	Award	Result	Ref
2017	DJ Snake	Dance Artist of the Year	Nominated	
2017	"Let Me Love You" (featuring Justin Bieber)	Dance Song of the Year	Nominated	

=== Joox Thailand Music Awards ===
Year	Nominee / work	Award	Result	Ref
2022	"SG" (with Ozuna, Megan Thee Stallion and Lisa)	International Song of the Year	Nominated	

=== Kids' Choice Awards ===
Year	Nominee / work	Award	Result	Ref
2017	DJ Snake	Favorite DJ/EDM Artist	Nominated	

=== MTV Video Music Awards ===
Year	Nominee / work	Award	Result	Ref
2014	"Turn Down for What" (with Lil Jon)	MTV Clubland Award	Nominated	
2014	"Turn Down for What" (with Lil Jon)	Best Direction	Won	
2014	"Turn Down for What" (with Lil Jon)	Best Visual Effects	Nominated	
2014	"Turn Down for What" (with Lil Jon)	Best Art Direction	Nominated	

=== NRJ Music Awards ===
Year	Nominee / work	Award	Result	Ref
2018	DJ Snake	Best French DJ	Won	

=== Premios Lo Nuestro ===
Year	Nominee / work	Award	Result	Ref
2023	"SG" (with Ozuna, Megan Thee Stallion and Lisa)	Crossover Collaboration of the Year	Nominated	

=== Teen Choice Awards ===
Year	Nominee / work	Award	Result	Ref
2014	"Turn Down for What" (with Lil Jon)	Choice Music: R&B/Hip-Hop Song	Nominated	

=== DJ Magazine Top 100 DJs ===
Year	Position	Notes	Ref.
2014	65	New Entry	
2015	32	Up 33	
2016	22	Up 10	
2017	23	Down 1	
2018	24	Down 1	
2019	16	Up 8	
2020	25	Down 9	
2021	33	Down 8	
2022	44	Down 11	
2023	38	Up 6	
2024	33	Up 5	
2025	40	Down 7	
