= Roddy Ricch discography =

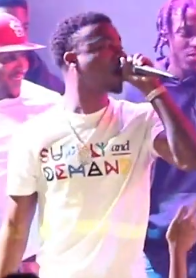
- Ricch in 2019
- Studio albums: 2
- Singles: 55
- Mixtapes: 3
- Extended Plays: 2

The discography of American rapper Roddy Ricch, consists of two studio albums, two extended plays, three mixtapes, and 55 singles (including 27 as a featured artist). His debut studio album, Please Excuse Me for Being Antisocial (2019), debuted at number one on the US Billboard 200. The album includes the singles "Big Stepper", "Start wit Me", "Tip Toe", "The Box", and "High Fashion". "The Box" became Roddy Ricch's highest-charting song worldwide, spending eleven weeks at number one on the US Billboard Hot 100; as well as topping the charts in Canada, New Zealand, Hungary, and peaking at number two in both the United Kingdom and Ireland. His second studio album, Live Life Fast debuted at number four on the US Billboard 200. The album was proceeded with one single, "Late at Night". Ricch's second studio album was less commercially successful in comparison to his debut album, leading some people believe that he was another prominent young artist to succumb to the sophomore slump. Through 2021 and 2022 Ricch released a total of ten singles, with only four of those solo.

== Studio albums ==
List of studio albums, with their respective details, selected chart positions, and certifications
Title	Album details	Peak chart positions										Certifications
Title	Album details	US	AUS	CAN	DEN	FRA	IRE	NLD	NZ	SWE	UK	Certifications
Please Excuse Me for Being Antisocial	Released: December 6, 2019; Label: Bird Vision, Atlantic; Formats: CD, LP, digital download, streaming	1	29	2	7	39	30	3	22	10	13	RIAA: 2× Platinum; BPI: Gold; IFPI DEN: Platinum; MC: Platinum; RMNZ: Platinum; SNEP: Gold
Live Life Fast	Released: December 17, 2021; Label: Bird Vision, Atlantic; Formats: Digital download, streaming	4	59	5	32	149	77	26	27	—	34	
The Navy Album	Label: Bird Vision, Atlantic; Formats: Digital download, streaming	To be released										
"—" denotes releases that did not chart or were not released.

== Extended plays ==
List of extended plays, with their respective details
Title	Extended play details
Be 4 tha Fame	Released: March 1, 2018; Label: Self-released; Format: CD, digital download
The Big 3	Released: June 24, 2022; Label: Bird Vision, Atlantic; Format: Digital download, streaming

== Mixtapes ==
List of mixtapes, with their respective details, selected chart positions, and certifications
Title	Mixtape details	Peak chart positions					Certifications
Title	Mixtape details	US	US R&B /HH	CAN	NLD	UK	Certifications
Feed Tha Streets	Released: November 22, 2017; Label: Bird Vision; Formats: Digital download	—	—	—	—	—	
Feed Tha Streets II	Released: November 2, 2018; Label: Bird Vision, Atlantic; Formats: Digital download, streaming	67	36	84	67	86	RIAA: Gold; BPI: Silver
Feed Tha Streets III	Released: November 18, 2022; Label: Bird Vision, Atlantic; Formats: Digital download, streaming	14	6	34	—	—	
"—" denotes a recording that did not chart, or was not released in that territory.

== Singles ==
=== As lead artist ===
List of singles as lead artist, with year released, selected chart positions, and certifications
Title	Year	Peak chart positions										Certifications	Album
Title	Year	US	US R&B /HH	AUS	CAN	FRA	IRE	NLD	NZ	SWE	UK	Certifications	Album
"Cuz I'm on" (with DJ Bugsy)	2015	—	—	—	—	—	—	—	—	—	—		Non-album single
"Chase tha Bag"	2017	—	—	—	—	—	—	—	—	—	—		Feed tha Streets
"Hoodricch"	2017	—	—	—	—	—	—	—	—	—	—		Feed tha Streets
"Fucc It Up"	2017	—	—	—	—	—	—	—	—	—	—		Feed tha Streets
"Die Young"	2018	99	38	—	—	—	—	—	—	—	84	RIAA: 2× Platinum; BPI: Gold; MC: Platinum; RMNZ: Gold	Feed tha Streets II
"Ricch Forever"	2018	—	—	—	—	—	—	—	—	—	—		Non-album single
"Every Season"	2018	— (Note: "Every Season" did not enter the Billboard Hot 100, but peaked at number 7 on the Bubbling Under Hot 100 chart.)	48	—	—	—	—	—	—	—	—	RIAA: Platinum; BPI: Silver; MC: Platinum; RMNZ: Gold	Feed tha Streets II
"Project Dreams" (with Marshmello)	2018	— (Note: "Project Dreams" did not enter the Billboard Hot 100, but peaked at number 8 on the Bubbling Under Hot 100 chart.)	46	—	—	—	87	—	— (Note: "Project Dreams" did not enter the NZ Top 40 Singles Chart, but peaked at number 20 on the NZ Hot Singles Chart.)	—	—	RIAA: Platinum; BPI: Silver; MC: Platinum; RMNZ: Gold	Non-album singles
"How It Is" (with Yxng Bane and Chip featuring the Plug)	2019	—	—	—	—	—	—	—	—	—	18	BPI: Silver	Non-album singles
"Out tha Mud"	2019	—	—	—	—	—	—	—	—	—	—		Non-album singles
"Ballin'" (with Mustard)	2019	11	4	72	34	—	42	98	—	—	37	RIAA: 7× Platinum; ARIA: Platinum; BPI: Platinum; MC: Platinum; RMNZ: 3× Platinum; SNEP: Gold	Perfect Ten
"Big Stepper"	2019	98	43	—	—	—	—	—	— (Note: "Big Stepper" did not enter the NZ Top 40 Singles Chart, but peaked at number 32 on the NZ Hot Singles Chart.)	—	—	RIAA: Platinum	Please Excuse Me for Being Antisocial
"Start wit Me" (featuring Gunna)	2019	56	25	—	63	—	—	—	— (Note: "Start wit Me" did not enter the NZ Top 40 Singles Chart, but peaked at number 37 on the NZ Hot Singles Chart.)	—	—	RIAA: 2× Platinum; MC: Platinum	Please Excuse Me for Being Antisocial
"Tip Toe" (featuring A Boogie wit da Hoodie)	2019	73	32	—	71	—	—	—	— (Note: "Tip Toe" did not enter the NZ Top 40 Singles Chart, but peaked at number 16 on the NZ Hot Singles Chart.)	—	—	RIAA: Platinum; MC: Gold	Please Excuse Me for Being Antisocial
"The Box"	2020	1	1	4	1	7	2	4	1	5	2	RIAA: Diamond; ARIA: 3× Platinum; BPI: 2× Platinum; MC: Diamond; RMNZ: 4× Platinum; SNEP: Diamond	Please Excuse Me for Being Antisocial
"High Fashion" (featuring Mustard)	2020	20	12	63	30	—	48	91	— (Note: "High Fashion" did not enter the NZ Top 40 Singles Chart, but peaked at number 25 on the NZ Hot Singles Chart.)	— (Note: "High Fashion" did not enter the Swedish Singellista Chart, but peaked at number seven on the Swedish Heatseeker Chart.)	45	RIAA: 4× Platinum; ARIA: Gold; BPI: Gold; MC: Platinum; RMNZ: Platinum	Please Excuse Me for Being Antisocial
"Heartless (Live from LA)"	2021	—	—	—	—	—	—	—	—	—	—		Non-album single
"4 da Gang" (with 42 Dugg)	2021	67	28	—	68	—	—	—	— (Note: "4 da Gang" did not enter the NZ Top 40 Singles Chart, but peaked at number 12 on the NZ Hot Singles Chart.)	—	—	RIAA: Gold	Free Dem Boyz
"Stunnaman" (with Birdman featuring Lil Wayne)	2021	—	—	—	—	—	—	—	—	—	—		Non-album single
"Late at Night"	2021	20	6	49	24	—	38	—	— (Note: "Late at Night" did not enter the NZ Top 40 Singles Chart, but peaked at number two on the NZ Hot Singles Chart.)	—	40	BPI: Silver; RMNZ: Platinum	Live Life Fast
"Lemme Find Out" (with Bino Rideaux)	2021	—	—	—	—	—	—	—	—	—	—		Sorry 4 tha Wait II
"Last One Left" (with Fredo Bang)	2022	—	—	—	—	—	—	—	—	—	—		Two-Face Bang 2
"Ghetto Superstar" (featuring G Herbo and Doe Boy)	2022	—	—	—	—	—	—	—	—	—	—		Non-album single
"Stop Breathing"	2022	— (Note: "Stop Breathing" did not enter the Billboard Hot 100, but peaked at number 4 on the Bubbling Under Hot 100 chart.)	31	—	90	—	—	—	— (Note: "Stop Breathing" did not enter the NZ Top 40 Singles Chart, but peaked at number 24 on the NZ Hot Singles Chart.)	—	—		Feed tha Streets III
"Aston Martin Truck"	2022	— (Note: "Aston Martin Truck" did not enter the Billboard Hot 100, but peaked at number 1 on the Bubbling Under Hot 100 chart.)	36	—	—	—	—	—	— (Note: "Aston Martin Truck" did not enter the NZ Top 40 Singles Chart, but peaked at number 16 on the NZ Hot Singles Chart.)	—	—		Feed tha Streets III
"Twin" (featuring Lil Durk)	2022	— (Note: "Twin" did not enter the Billboard Hot 100, but peaked at number 1 on the Bubbling Under Hot 100 chart.)	35	—	—	—	—	—	—	—	—		Feed tha Streets III
"I Remember" (with Internet Money and Kodak Black)	2023	—	41	—	—	—	—	—	—	—	—		TBA
"Closed Doors" (with Trippie Redd)	2023	—	—	—	—	—	—	—	— (Note: "Closed Doors" did not enter the NZ Top 40 Singles Chart, but peaked at number 22 on the NZ Hot Singles Chart.)	—	—		A Love Letter to You 5
"Survivor's Remorse"	2024	— (Note: "Survivor's Remorse" did not enter the Billboard Hot 100, but peaked at number 4 on the Bubbling Under Hot 100 chart.)	33	—	—	—	—	—	— (Note: "Survivor's Remorse" did not enter the NZ Top 40 Singles Chart, but peaked at number 21 on the NZ Hot Singles Chart.)	—	—		The Navy Album
"911"	2024	—	—	—	—	—	—	—	— (Note: "911" did not enter the NZ Top 40 Singles Chart, but peaked at number 35 on the NZ Hot Singles Chart.)	—	—		Non-album single
"Lonely Road" (featuring Terrace Martin)	2024	—	—	—	—	—	—	—	—	—	—		The Navy Album
"—" denotes a recording that did not chart, or was not released in that territory.

=== As featured artist ===
List of singles as lead artist, with year released, selected chart positions, certifications, and album name
Title	Year	Peak chart positions										Certifications	Album
Title	Year	US	US R&B /HH	AUS	CAN	FRA	IRE	NLD	NZ	SWE	UK	Certifications	Album
"Basic Bitch" (Lil HotB featuring Roddy Ricch)	2018	—	—	—	—	—	—	—	—	—	—		Non-album singles
"Humble" (Orrin King featuring Roddy Ricch)	2018	—	—	—	—	—	—	—	—	—	—		Non-album singles
"4Sho' X2" (Wizz Dakota featuring Roddy Ricch)	2018	—	—	—	—	—	—	—	—	—	—		Non-album singles
"Out the Streets" (Oun-P featuring Roddy Ricch)	2018	—	—	—	—	—	—	—	—	—	—		Non-album singles
"Racks in the Middle" (Nipsey Hussle featuring Roddy Ricch and Hit-Boy)	2019	26	11	—	47	—	70	—	— (Note: "Racks in the Middle" did not enter the NZ Top 40 Singles Chart, but peaked at number 15 on the NZ Hot Singles Chart.)	—	59	RIAA: Platinum; BPI: Silver; MC: Platinum; RMNZ: Gold	Non-album singles
"Wow" (Remix) (Post Malone featuring Roddy Ricch and Tyga)	2019	—	—	—	—	—	—	—	—	—	—		Non-album singles
"Chase the Money" (E-40 featuring Quavo, Roddy Ricch, ASAP Ferg, and Schoolboy Q)	2019	—	—	—	—	—	—	—	—	—	—		Practice Makes Paper
"Go Up" (Rich the Kid featuring Roddy Ricch)	2019	—	—	—	—	—	—	—	—	—	—		Non-album singles
"Law of Attraction" (Cascio featuring Roddy Ricch)	2019	—	—	—	—	—	—	—	—	—	—		Non-album singles
"Lips Closed" (Cash Gotti featuring Roddy Ricch)	2019	—	—	—	—	—	—	—	—	—	—		Non-album singles
"Want It" (Izzy Izzy featuring Roddy Ricch)	2019	—	—	—	—	—	—	—	—	—	—		Non-album singles
"Letter to Nipsey" (Meek Mill featuring Roddy Ricch)	2020	73	34	—	—	—	—	—	—	—	—		Non-album singles
"Walk Em Down" (NLE Choppa featuring Roddy Ricch)	2020	38	16	—	49	—	65	—	— (Note: "Walk Em Down" did not enter the NZ Top 40 Singles Chart, but peaked at number nine on the NZ Hot Singles Chart.)	—	85	RIAA: 3× Platinum; BPI: Silver; MC: 4× Platinum; RMNZ: Platinum	Top Shotta
"Numbers" (A Boogie wit da Hoodie featuring Roddy Ricch, Gunna, and London on da Track)	2020	23	12	—	32	—	90	—	— (Note: "Numbers" did not enter the NZ Top 40 Singles Chart, but peaked at number 16 on the NZ Hot Singles Chart.)	—	53	RIAA: Platinum; MC: Platinum	Artist 2.0
"Rockstar" (DaBaby featuring Roddy Ricch)	2020	1	1	1	1	6	1	1	1	3	1	RIAA: 5× Platinum; ARIA: 5× Platinum; BPI: 3× Platinum; MC: 8× Platinum; NVPI: Gold; RMNZ: 5× Platinum; SNEP: Diamond	Blame It on Baby
"The Woo" (Pop Smoke featuring 50 Cent and Roddy Ricch)	2020	11	9	18	6	39	13	10	10	23	9	RIAA: 2× Platinum; ARIA: Platinum; BPI: Platinum; GLF: Gold; RMNZ: 2× Platinum; SNEP: Platinum	Shoot for the Stars, Aim for the Moon
"Gifted" (Cordae featuring Roddy Ricch)	2020	— (Note: "Gifted" did not enter the Billboard Hot 100, but peaked at number 1 on the Bubbling Under Hot 100 chart.)	37	—	84	—	—	—	— (Note: "Gifted" did not enter the NZ Top 40 Singles Chart, but peaked at number 9 on the NZ Hot Singles Chart.)	—	—		From a Birds Eye View
"Lemonade (Remix)" (Internet Money featuring Don Toliver and Roddy Ricch)	2020	—	—	—	—	—	—	—	—	—	—		B4 the Storm
"Body in Motion" (DJ Khaled featuring Bryson Tiller, Lil Baby, and Roddy Ricch)	2021	79	33	—	66	—	—	—	— (Note: "Body in Motion" did not enter the NZ Top 40 Singles Chart, but peaked at number 16 on the NZ Hot Singles Chart.)	—	—		Khaled Khaled
"Too Easy" (Remix) (Gunna featuring Future and Roddy Ricch)	2021	—	—	—	—	—	—	—	—	—	—		DS4Ever
"Real Ones" (Mozzy featuring Roddy Ricch)	2022	—	—	—	—	—	—	—	—	—	—		Survivor's Guilt
"Cooped Up" (Post Malone featuring Roddy Ricch)	2022	12	5	10	10	—	20	—	8	26	18	ARIA: Platinum; BPI: Silver; MC: Platinum; RMNZ: Platinum	Twelve Carat Toothache
"How" (Ella Mai featuring Roddy Ricch)	2022	—	—	—	—	—	—	—	— (Note: "How" did not enter the NZ Top 40 Singles Chart, but peaked at number 33 on the NZ Hot Singles Chart.)	—	—		Heart on My Sleeve
"Never Change" (Symba featuring Roddy Ricch)	2022	—	—	—	—	—	—	—	—	—	—		Results Take Time
"B.R.O. (Better Ride Out)" (A Boogie wit da Hoodie featuring Roddy Ricch)	2022	— (Note: "B.R.O. (Better Ride Out)" did not enter the Billboard Hot 100, but peaked at number 13 on the Bubbling Under Hot 100 Singles chart.)	41	—	82	—	—	—	25	—	—		Me vs. Myself
"Passionate" (Blxst featuring Roddy Ricch)	2023	—	—	—	—	—	—	—	— (Note: "Passionate" did not enter the NZ Top 40 Singles Chart, but peaked at number 33 on the NZ Hot Singles Chart.)	—	—		Just for Clarity 2
"Pissy" (Gucci Mane featuring Roddy Ricch and Nardo Wick)	2023	— (Note: "Pissy" did not enter the Billboard Hot 100, but peaked at number 15 on the Bubbling Under Hot 100 Singles chart.)	37	—	—	—	—	—	—	—	—		Breath of Fresh Air
"—" denotes a recording that did not chart, or was not released in that territory.

==== Promotional singles ====
Song, showing year released and album name
Title	Year	Album
"One Bad Decision" (Mustard featuring Ella Mai and Roddy Ricch)	2024	Faith of a Mustard Seed

== Other charted and certified songs ==
List of other charted and certified songs, with selected chart positions, showing year released and album name
Title	Year	Peak chart positions					Certifications	Album
Title	Year	US	US R&B /HH	CAN	NZ	NZ Hot	Certifications	Album
"Down Below"	2018	—	—	—	—	—	RIAA: Gold; BPI: Silver; MC: Gold; RMNZ: Platinum	Feed Tha Streets II
"Splash Warning" (Meek Mill featuring Future, Roddy Ricch, and Young Thug)	2018	77	42	—	—	—		Championships
"Intro"	2019	— (Note: "Intro" did not enter the Billboard Hot 100, but peaked at number five on the Bubbling Under Hot 100 chart.)	50	—	—	—	RIAA: Gold	Please Excuse Me for Being Antisocial
"Perfect Time"	2019	— (Note: "Perfect Time" did not enter the Billboard Hot 100, but peaked at number seven on the Bubbling Under Hot 100 chart.)	—	—	—	—	RIAA: Gold	Please Excuse Me for Being Antisocial
"Moonwalkin" (featuring Lil Durk)	2019	— (Note: "Moonwalkin" did not enter the Billboard Hot 100, but peaked at number 20 on the Bubbling Under Hot 100 chart.)	—	—	—	—		Please Excuse Me for Being Antisocial
"God's Eyes"	2019	— (Note: "God's Eyes" did not enter the Billboard Hot 100, but peaked at number 19 on the Bubbling Under Hot 100 chart.)	—	—	—	—		Please Excuse Me for Being Antisocial
"Peta" (featuring Meek Mill)	2019	72	31	72	—	29	RIAA: Platinum; MC: Gold	Please Excuse Me for Being Antisocial
"Boom Boom Room"	2019	— (Note: "Boom Boom Room" did not enter the Billboard Hot 100, but peaked at number 5 on the Bubbling Under Hot 100 chart.)	—	—	—	—	RIAA: Platinum	Please Excuse Me for Being Antisocial
"Bacc Seat" (featuring Ty Dolla Sign)	2019	— (Note: "Bacc Seat" did not enter the Billboard Hot 100, but peaked at number two on the Bubbling Under Hot 100 chart.)	49	—	—	35	RIAA: Platinum; BPI: Silver; RMNZ: Platinum	Please Excuse Me for Being Antisocial
"War Baby"	2019	— (Note: "War Baby" did not enter the Billboard Hot 100, but peaked at number 21 on the Bubbling Under Hot 100 chart.)	—	—	—	—	RIAA: Gold	Please Excuse Me for Being Antisocial
"Cooler Than a Bitch" (Gunna featuring Roddy Ricch)	2020	41	16	51	—	11	RIAA: Gold	Wunna
"Fame & Riches" (Polo G featuring Roddy Ricch)	2021	— (Note: "Fame & Riches" did not enter the Billboard Hot 100, but peaked at number nine on the Bubbling Under Hot 100 chart.)	—	—	—	—		Hall of Fame
"Pure Souls" (Kanye West featuring Roddy Ricch and Shenseea)	2021	52	25	46	—	—	RIAA: Gold	Donda
"Thailand"	2021	95	26	84	—	15		Live Life Fast
"All Good" (featuring Future)	2021	— (Note: "All Good" did not enter the Billboard Hot 100, but peaked at number two on the Bubbling Under Hot 100 chart.)	32	—	—	—		Live Life Fast
"Rollercoastin"	2021	— (Note: "Rollercoastin" did not enter the Billboard Hot 100, but peaked at number 22 on the Bubbling Under Hot 100 chart.)	—	—	—	—		Live Life Fast
"Hibachi" (featuring Kodak Black and 21 Savage)	2021	91	25	77	—	13		Live Life Fast
"Paid My Dues" (featuring Takeoff)	2021	— (Note: "Paid My Dues" did not enter the Billboard Hot 100, but peaked at number 20 on the Bubbling Under Hot 100 chart.)	—	—	—	—		Live Life Fast
"Moved to Miami" (featuring Lil Baby)	2021	85	21	87	—	24		Live Life Fast
"Don't I" (featuring Gunna)	2021	— (Note: "Don't I" did not enter the Billboard Hot 100, but peaked at number 11 on the Bubbling Under Hot 100 chart.)	44	—	—	—		Live Life Fast
"25 Million"	2021	77	18	71	—	10		Live Life Fast
"Real Talk"	2022	— (Note: "Real Talk" did not enter the Billboard Hot 100, but peaked at number 12 on the Bubbling Under Hot 100 chart.)	—	—	—	35		The Big 3
"Keep Going" (DJ Khaled featuring Lil Durk, 21 Savage, and Roddy Ricch)	2022	57	18	67	—	—		God Did
"Fam Good, We Good" (DJ Khaled featuring Gunna and Roddy Ricch)	2022	— (Note: "Fam Good, We Good" did not enter the Billboard Hot 100, but peaked at number nine on the Bubbling Under Hot 100 chart.)	39	—	—	—		God Did
"Sober" (YG featuring Roddy Ricch and Post Malone)	2022	—	—	—	—	19		I Got Issues
"Let It Breathe" (Gunna featuring Roddy Ricch)	2024	—	49	—	—	—		One of Wun
"Dodger Blue" (Kendrick Lamar featuring Wallie the Sensei, Siete7x, and Roddy Ricch)	2024	11	8	29	18	—		GNX
"—" denotes a recording that did not chart, or was not released in that territory.

== Guest appearances ==
List of non-single guest appearances, with other performing artists, showing year released and album name
Title	Year	Other artists	Album
"Blue Face Benjis"	2017	Hollywood Beats	Hollywood Blvd
"Splash Warning"	2018	Meek Mill, Future, Young Thug	Championships
"Pray 4 My Enemies"	2019	Philthy Rich	The Remixes 3
"Hop In"	2019	Friyie	ANF: Ain't Nothing Free
"Project Baby"	2019	Super Cool Q	Pc1
"Still wit It"	2019	YFL Kelvin	Neva Lookin Back
"Evolved"	2019	PnB Rock	TrapStar Turnt PopStar (Deluxe)
"Dragon"	2019	Lil Keed	Long Live Mexico
"Doheny"	2019	Kember	Smiles & Cries
"The Bottom"	2019	C Clip Beatz	Rap & Beats
"Made It Happen"	2019	Filiboimoe	Made It Happen
"Time"	2019	Fabolous	Summertime Shootout 3: Coldest Summer Ever
"Cooler Than a Bitch"	2020	Gunna	Wunna
"Real Life"	2020	Ty Dolla Sign, Mustard	Featuring Ty Dolla Sign
"Fame & Riches"	2021	Polo G	Hall of Fame
"Pure Souls"	2021	Kanye West, Shenseea	Donda
"Real Recognize Real"	2022	Doe Boy	Oh Really
"Outstanding"	2022	2 Chainz	Dope Don't Sell Itself
"How Far I Came"	2022	The Game	Drillmatic – Heart vs. Mind
"Keep Going"	2022	DJ Khaled, Lil Durk, 21 Savage	God Did
"Fam Good, We Good"	2022	DJ Khaled, Gunna	God Did
"Sober"	2022	YG, Post Malone	I Got Issues
"FMFU"	2023	DJ Drama, Lil Wayne, Gucci Mane	I´M REALLY LIKE THAT
"Let It Breathe"	2024	Gunna	One of Wun
"Truth Is"	2024	Mustard	Faith of a Mustard Seed
"Dodger Blue"	2024	Kendrick Lamar, WallieTheSensei, Siete7x	GNX

== Music videos ==
=== As lead artist ===
Title	Year	Other performer(s) credited	Director(s)	Album	Ref(s)
"Baby Boy"	May 2, 2017	—N/a	Unknown	Feed Tha Streets	
"Fucc It Up"	October 27, 2017	—N/a	JD Films	Feed Tha Streets	
"Hoodricch"	January 23, 2018	—N/a	SkyyLiineVisualz	Feed Tha Streets	
"Ricch Vibes"	April 17, 2018	—N/a	JD Films	Feed Tha Streets	
"Chase Tha Bag"	May 28, 2018	—N/a	JD Films	Feed Tha Streets	
"Die Young"	July 23, 2018	—N/a	JD Films	Feed Tha Streets II	
"Every Season"	October 29, 2018	—N/a	JD Films	Feed Tha Streets II	
"Can't Express"	November 20, 2018	—N/a	JD Films	Feed Tha Streets II	
"Project Dreams"	December 6, 2018	Marshmello		—N/a	
"Down Below"	February 28, 2019	—N/a	JMP	Feed Tha Streets II	
"How It Is"	February 28, 2019	Yxng Bane, Chip, The Plug		—N/a	
"Out Tha Mud"	June 6, 2019	—N/a		—	
"Ballin'"	October 2, 2019	Mustard		Perfect Ten	
"Big Stepper"	October 11, 2019	—N/a		Please Excuse Me for Being Antisocial	
"Start Wit Me"	October 28, 2019	Gunna		Please Excuse Me for Being Antisocial	
"Tip Toe"	November 25, 2019	A Boogie wit da Hoodie		Please Excuse Me for Being Antisocial	
"Boom Boom Room"	January 22, 2020	—N/a		Please Excuse Me for Being Antisocial	
"The Box"	February 28, 2020	—N/a		Please Excuse Me for Being Antisocial	
"4 Da Gang"	April 29, 2021	42 Dugg		Free Dem Boyz	
"Stunnaman"	May 21, 2021	Birdman, Lil Wayne		—N/a	
"Late at Night"	June 4, 2021	—N/a	Live Life Fast		
"LLF"	December 9, 2021	—N/a	Live Life Fast		
"25 Million"	December 17, 2021	—N/a	Live Life Fast		
"Last One Left"	April 15, 2022	Fredo Bang		Two-Face Bang 2	
"Real Talk"	June 27, 2022	—N/a		The Big 3	
"Stop Breathing"	September 30, 2022	—N/a		Feed Tha Streets III	
"Aston Martin Truck"	October 21, 2022	—N/a		Feed Tha Streets III	
"Twin"	November 21, 2022	Lil Durk		Feed Tha Streets III	
"Closed Doors"	August 14, 2023	Trippie Redd		A Love Letter to You 5	
"Survivor's Remorse"	May 31, 2024	—N/a		The Navy Album	
"911"	June 27, 2024	—N/a		The Navy Album	
"Lonely Road"	December 6, 2024	Terrace Martin		The Navy Album	

=== Film Soundtrack ===
Song	Year	Album	Co-Artist(s)
"Underdog"	2025	F1 the Album	
