= List of number-one R&B/hip-hop songs of 2020 (U.S.) =

This page lists the songs that reached number-one on the overall Hot R&B/Hip-Hop Songs chart, the R&B Songs chart (which was created in 2012), and the Hot Rap Songs chart in 2020. The R&B Songs and Rap Songs charts partly serve as distillations of the overall R&B/Hip-Hop Songs chart.

== List of number ones ==
Key
†	Indicates best-performing song of 2020

Issue date	R&B/Hip-Hop Songs	Artist	R&B Songs	Artist	Rap Songs	Artist	R&B/Hip-Hop Airplay	Artist	Refs.
January 4	"Roxanne"	Arizona Zervas	"Good as Hell"	Lizzo	"Roxanne"	Arizona Zervas	"No Guidance" †	Chris Brown featuring Drake	
January 11	"The Box"	Roddy Ricch	"Good as Hell"	Lizzo	"The Box" †	Roddy Ricch	"No Guidance" †	Chris Brown featuring Drake	
January 18	"The Box"	Roddy Ricch	"Yummy"	Justin Bieber	"The Box" †	Roddy Ricch	"No Guidance" †	Chris Brown featuring Drake	
January 25	"The Box"	Roddy Ricch	"Yummy"	Justin Bieber	"The Box" †	Roddy Ricch	"No Guidance" †	Chris Brown featuring Drake	
February 1	"The Box"	Roddy Ricch	"Yummy"	Justin Bieber	"The Box" †	Roddy Ricch	"No Guidance" †	Chris Brown featuring Drake	
February 8	"The Box"	Roddy Ricch	"Good as Hell"	Lizzo	"The Box" †	Roddy Ricch	"No Guidance" †	Chris Brown featuring Drake	
February 15	"The Box"	Roddy Ricch	"Yummy"	Justin Bieber	"The Box" †	Roddy Ricch	"No Guidance" †	Chris Brown featuring Drake	
February 22	"The Box"	Roddy Ricch	"Intentions"	Justin Bieber featuring Quavo	"The Box" †	Roddy Ricch	"No Guidance" †	Chris Brown featuring Drake	
February 29	"The Box"	Roddy Ricch	"Intentions"	Justin Bieber featuring Quavo	"The Box" †	Roddy Ricch	"The Box"	Roddy Ricch	
March 7	"The Box"	Roddy Ricch	"Blinding Lights" †	The Weeknd	"The Box" †	Roddy Ricch	"The Box"	Roddy Ricch	
March 14	"The Box"	Roddy Ricch	"Blinding Lights" †	The Weeknd	"The Box" †	Roddy Ricch	"The Box"	Roddy Ricch	
March 21	"The Box"	Roddy Ricch	"Blinding Lights" †	The Weeknd	"The Box" †	Roddy Ricch	"The Box"	Roddy Ricch	
March 28	"The Box"	Roddy Ricch	"Blinding Lights" †	The Weeknd	"The Box" †	Roddy Ricch	"The Box"	Roddy Ricch	
April 4	"Blinding Lights" †	The Weeknd	"Blinding Lights" †	The Weeknd	"The Box" †	Roddy Ricch	"The Box"	Roddy Ricch	
April 11	"Blinding Lights" †	The Weeknd	"Blinding Lights" †	The Weeknd	"The Box" †	Roddy Ricch	"The Box"	Roddy Ricch	
April 18	"Toosie Slide"	Drake	"Blinding Lights" †	The Weeknd	"Toosie Slide"	Drake	"The Box"	Roddy Ricch	
April 25	"Blinding Lights" †	The Weeknd	"Blinding Lights" †	The Weeknd	"Toosie Slide"	Drake	"The Box"	Roddy Ricch	
May 2	"Blinding Lights" †	The Weeknd	"Blinding Lights" †	The Weeknd	"Toosie Slide"	Drake	"The Box"	Roddy Ricch	
May 9	"The Scotts"	The Scotts, Travis Scott and Kid Cudi	"Blinding Lights" †	The Weeknd	"The Scotts"	The Scotts, Travis Scott and Kid Cudi	"The Box"	Roddy Ricch	
May 16	"Say So"	Doja Cat featuring Nicki Minaj	"Say So"	Doja Cat featuring Nicki Minaj	"Savage"	Megan Thee Stallion featuring Beyoncé	"The Box"	Roddy Ricch	
May 23	"Say So"	Doja Cat featuring Nicki Minaj	"Say So"	Doja Cat featuring Nicki Minaj	"Gooba"	6ix9ine	"Savage"	Megan Thee Stallion featuring Beyoncé	
May 30	"Savage"	Megan Thee Stallion featuring Beyoncé	"Say So"	Doja Cat featuring Nicki Minaj	"Savage"	Megan Thee Stallion featuring Beyoncé	"Savage"	Megan Thee Stallion featuring Beyoncé	
June 6	"Savage"	Megan Thee Stallion featuring Beyoncé	"Blinding Lights" †	The Weeknd	"Savage"	Megan Thee Stallion featuring Beyoncé	"Savage"	Megan Thee Stallion featuring Beyoncé	
June 13	"Rockstar"	DaBaby featuring Roddy Ricch	"Blinding Lights" †	The Weeknd	"Rockstar"	DaBaby featuring Roddy Ricch	"High Fashion"	Roddy Ricch featuring Mustard	
June 20	"Rockstar"	DaBaby featuring Roddy Ricch	"Blinding Lights" †	The Weeknd	"Rockstar"	DaBaby featuring Roddy Ricch	"High Fashion"	Roddy Ricch featuring Mustard	
June 27	"Trollz"	6ix9ine and Nicki Minaj	"Blinding Lights" †	The Weeknd	"Trollz"	6ix9ine and Nicki Minaj	"High Fashion"	Roddy Ricch featuring Mustard	
July 4	"Rockstar"	DaBaby featuring Roddy Ricch	"Blinding Lights" †	The Weeknd	"Rockstar"	DaBaby featuring Roddy Ricch	"High Fashion"	Roddy Ricch featuring Mustard	
July 11	"Rockstar"	DaBaby featuring Roddy Ricch	"Blinding Lights" †	The Weeknd	"Rockstar"	DaBaby featuring Roddy Ricch	"High Fashion"	Roddy Ricch featuring Mustard	
July 18	"Rockstar"	DaBaby featuring Roddy Ricch	"Blinding Lights" †	The Weeknd	"Rockstar"	DaBaby featuring Roddy Ricch	"High Fashion"	Roddy Ricch featuring Mustard	
July 25	"Rockstar"	DaBaby featuring Roddy Ricch	"Blinding Lights" †	The Weeknd	"Rockstar"	DaBaby featuring Roddy Ricch	"Rockstar"	DaBaby featuring Roddy Ricch	
August 1	"Rockstar"	DaBaby featuring Roddy Ricch	"Blinding Lights" †	The Weeknd	"Rockstar"	DaBaby featuring Roddy Ricch	"Rockstar"	DaBaby featuring Roddy Ricch	
August 8	"Rockstar"	DaBaby featuring Roddy Ricch	"Blinding Lights" †	The Weeknd	"Rockstar"	DaBaby featuring Roddy Ricch	"Rockstar"	DaBaby featuring Roddy Ricch	
August 15	"Rockstar"	DaBaby featuring Roddy Ricch	"Blinding Lights" †	The Weeknd	"Rockstar"	DaBaby featuring Roddy Ricch	"Rockstar"	DaBaby featuring Roddy Ricch	
August 22	"WAP"	Cardi B featuring Megan Thee Stallion	"Blinding Lights" †	The Weeknd	"WAP"	Cardi B featuring Megan Thee Stallion	"Go Crazy"	Chris Brown and Young Thug	
August 29	"WAP"	Cardi B featuring Megan Thee Stallion	"Blinding Lights" †	The Weeknd	"WAP"	Cardi B featuring Megan Thee Stallion	"Go Crazy"	Chris Brown and Young Thug	
September 5	"WAP"	Cardi B featuring Megan Thee Stallion	"Blinding Lights" †	The Weeknd	"WAP"	Cardi B featuring Megan Thee Stallion	"Go Crazy"	Chris Brown and Young Thug	
September 12	"WAP"	Cardi B featuring Megan Thee Stallion	"Blinding Lights" †	The Weeknd	"WAP"	Cardi B featuring Megan Thee Stallion	"Go Crazy"	Chris Brown and Young Thug	
September 19	"WAP"	Cardi B featuring Megan Thee Stallion	"Blinding Lights" †	The Weeknd	"WAP"	Cardi B featuring Megan Thee Stallion	"Go Crazy"	Chris Brown and Young Thug	
September 26	"WAP"	Cardi B featuring Megan Thee Stallion	"Blinding Lights" †	The Weeknd	"WAP"	Cardi B featuring Megan Thee Stallion	"Go Crazy"	Chris Brown and Young Thug	
October 3	"WAP"	Cardi B featuring Megan Thee Stallion	"Blinding Lights" †	The Weeknd	"WAP"	Cardi B featuring Megan Thee Stallion	"Laugh Now Cry Later"	Drake featuring Lil Durk	
October 10	"Franchise"	Travis Scott featuring Young Thug and M.I.A.	"Blinding Lights" †	The Weeknd	"Franchise"	Travis Scott featuring Young Thug and M.I.A.	"Laugh Now Cry Later"	Drake featuring Lil Durk	
October 17	"WAP"	Cardi B featuring Megan Thee Stallion	"Blinding Lights" †	The Weeknd	"WAP"	Cardi B featuring Megan Thee Stallion	"Laugh Now Cry Later"	Drake featuring Lil Durk	
October 24	"WAP"	Cardi B featuring Megan Thee Stallion	"Blinding Lights" †	The Weeknd	"Mood"	24kGoldn featuring Iann Dior	"Laugh Now Cry Later"	Drake featuring Lil Durk	
October 31	"WAP"	Cardi B featuring Megan Thee Stallion	"Blinding Lights" †	The Weeknd	"Mood"	24kGoldn featuring Iann Dior	"Laugh Now Cry Later"	Drake featuring Lil Durk	
November 7	"Laugh Now Cry Later"	Drake featuring Lil Durk	"Blinding Lights" †	The Weeknd	"Mood"	24kGoldn featuring Iann Dior	"Laugh Now Cry Later"	Drake featuring Lil Durk	
November 14	"Laugh Now Cry Later"	Drake featuring Lil Durk	"Blinding Lights" †	The Weeknd	"Mood"	24kGoldn featuring Iann Dior	"Go Crazy"	Chris Brown and Young Thug	
November 21	"Laugh Now Cry Later"	Drake featuring Lil Durk	"Blinding Lights" †	The Weeknd	"Mood"	24kGoldn featuring Iann Dior	"Go Crazy"	Chris Brown and Young Thug	
November 28	"Laugh Now Cry Later"	Drake featuring Lil Durk	"Blinding Lights" †	The Weeknd	"Mood"	24kGoldn featuring Iann Dior	"Go Crazy"	Chris Brown and Young Thug	
December 5	"Laugh Now Cry Later"	Drake featuring Lil Durk	"Blinding Lights" †	The Weeknd	"Mood"	24kGoldn featuring Iann Dior	"Go Crazy"	Chris Brown and Young Thug	
December 12	"Laugh Now Cry Later"	Drake featuring Lil Durk	"Blinding Lights" †	The Weeknd	"Mood"	24kGoldn featuring Iann Dior	"Go Crazy"	Chris Brown and Young Thug	
December 19	"Blinding Lights" †	The Weeknd	"Blinding Lights" †	The Weeknd	"Mood"	24kGoldn featuring Iann Dior	"Go Crazy"	Chris Brown and Young Thug	
December 26	"Go Crazy"	Chris Brown and Young Thug	"Go Crazy"	Chris Brown and Young Thug	"Mood"	24kGoldn featuring Iann Dior	"Go Crazy"	Chris Brown and Young Thug	

== See also ==
- Billboard Year-End Hot R&B/Hip-Hop Songs of 2020
- List of Billboard Hot 100 number-one singles of 2020
- List of Billboard number-one R&B/hip-hop albums of 2020
