= BET Awards 2020 =

2020 American television program

2020 BET Awards
- Date: June 28, 2020
- Location: Microsoft Theater, Los Angeles, California
- Presented by: Black Entertainment Television
- Hosted by: Amanda Seales

Highlights
- Most awards: Beyoncé; Chris Brown; Roddy Ricch and Megan Thee Stallion (2 each)
- Most nominations: Drake (6)
- Website: www.bet.com/shows/bet-awards.html

Television/radio coverage
- Network: BET; BET Her; CBS (simulcast)
- Directed by: Glenn Weiss

The 20th BET Awards took place on June 28, 2020. The ceremony celebrates achievements in entertainment and honors music, sports, television, and movies. They also honored the many African-American people killed from police brutality and racial injustice in the United States. It was held virtually due to the effects of the COVID-19 lockdowns, and for the first time, was simulcast on broadcast television on the CBS Television Network, negating the need for a "roadblock" simulcast across all of the cable networks of ViacomCBS. The ceremony marks the award show's 20th year on air and the 40th anniversary of Black Entertainment Television, as well as the first-ever virtual ceremony in its history.

The nominees were announced on June 15, 2020. Drake received the most nominations with 6, ahead of Roddy Ricch and Megan Thee Stallion, who tied with five nominations each. It was also announced that same day that the ceremony will be hosted by actor and comedian Amanda Seales. Beyoncé was presented with the Humanitarian Award by Michelle Obama.

== Performers ==
Artist(s)	Song(s)
Main show
Keedron Bryant; Public Enemy; Nas; Black Thought; Questlove; Rapsody; YG	"I Just Wanna Live" "Fight the Power"
Roddy Ricch	"High Fashion" "The Box"
John Legend	"Never Break"
Masego	"Queen Tings"
D Smoke; SiR	"Let Go" "Black Habits"
Megan Thee Stallion	"Girls in the Hood" "Savage Remix"
DaBaby; Roddy Ricch	"Rockstar"
Jennifer Hudson	"To Be Young, Gifted and Black"
Anderson .Paak; Jay Rock	"Lockdown"
Lonr.	"Make the Most"
Wayne Brady	Tribute to Little Richard "Lucille" "Good Golly, Miss Molly" "Tutti Frutti"
Lil Wayne	Tribute to Kobe Bryant "Kobe Bryant"
Alicia Keys	"Perfect Way to Die"
Chloe x Halle	"Forgive Me" "Do It"
Summer Walker; Usher	"Session 32" "Come Thru" "You Make Me Wanna..."
Jonathan McReynolds; Kane Brown	"People" "Worldwide Beautiful"
Kierra Sheard; Karen Clark Sheard	"Something Has to Break"

== Winners and nominees ==
Album of the Year	Video of the Year
Please Excuse Me For Being Antisocial – Roddy Ricch; Cuz I Love You – Lizzo; Fever – Megan Thee Stallion; Homecoming: The Live Album – Beyoncé; I Used to Know Her – H.E.R.; Kirk – DaBaby	DJ Khaled featuring Nipsey Hussle & John Legend – "Higher"; Chris Brown featuring Drake – "No Guidance"; DaBaby – "Bop"; Doja Cat – "Say So"; Megan Thee Stallion featuring Nicki Minaj & Ty Dolla $ign– "Hot Girl Summer"; Roddy Ricch – "The Box"
Coca-Cola Viewers' Choice Award	Best Collaboration
Megan Thee Stallion featuring Nicki Minaj & Ty Dolla $ign– "Hot Girl Summer"; Chris Brown featuring Drake – "No Guidance"; DaBaby – "Bop"; Future featuring Drake – "Life is Good"; Roddy Ricch – "The Box"; The Weeknd – "Heartless"	Chris Brown featuring Drake – "No Guidance"; DJ Khaled featuring Nipsey Hussle & John Legend – "Higher"; Future featuring Drake – "Life is Good"; H.E.R. featuring YG – "Slide"; Megan Thee Stallion featuring Nicki Minaj & Ty Dolla $ign– "Hot Girl Summer"; Wale featuring Jeremih – "On Chill"
Best Female R&B/Pop Artist	Best Male R&B/Pop Artist
Lizzo; Beyoncé; H.E.R.; Jhene Aiko; Kehlani; Summer Walker	Chris Brown; Anderson .Paak; Jacquees; Khalid; The Weeknd; Usher
Best Female Hip Hop Artist	Best Male Hip Hop Artist
Megan Thee Stallion; Cardi B; Doja Cat; Lizzo; Nicki Minaj; Saweetie	DaBaby; Drake; Future; Lil Baby; Roddy Ricch; Travis Scott
Best Group	Best New Artist
Migos; Chloe x Halle; City Girls; EarthGang; Griselda; JackBoys	Roddy Ricch; DaniLeigh; Lil Nas X; Pop Smoke; Summer Walker; YBN Cordae
Dr. Bobby Jones Best Gospel/Inspirational Award	BET Her Award
Kirk Franklin – "Just for Me"; Fred Hammond – "Alright"; John P. Kee featuring Zacardi Cortez – "I Made It Out"; Kanye West – "Follow God"; PJ Morton featuring Le'Andria Johnson & Mary Mary – "All In His Plan"; The Clark Sisters – "Victory"	Beyoncé featuring Blue Ivy, WizKid & Saint Jhn – "Brown Skin Girl"^{^[a]}; Alicia Keys – "Underdog"; Ciara featuring Lupita Nyong'o, Ester Dean, City Girls & La La – "Melanin"; Layton Greene – "I Choose"; Lizzo featuring Missy Elliott – "Tempo"; Rapsody featuring PJ Morgan – "Afeni"
Video Director of the Year	Best Movie
Teyana Taylor; Benny Boom; Cole Bennett; Dave Meyers; Director X; Eif Rivera	Queen & Slim; Bad Boys for Life; Dolemite Is My Name; Harriet; Homecoming: A Film by Beyoncé; Just Mercy
Best Actress	Best Actor
Issa Rae; Angela Bassett; Cynthia Erivo; Regina King; Tracee Ellis Ross; Zendaya	Michael B. Jordan; Billy Porter; Eddie Murphy; Forest Whitaker; Jamie Foxx; Omari Hardwick; Will Smith
YoungStars Award	Sportswoman of the Year
Marsai Martin; Alex Hibbert; Asante Blackk; Jahi Di'Allo Winston; Miles Brown; Storm Reid	Simone Biles; Ajeé Wilson; Claressa Shields; Coco Gauff; Naomi Osaka; Serena Williams
Sportsman of the Year	Best International Act
LeBron James; Giannis Antetokounmpo; Kawhi Leonard; Odell Beckham Jr.; Patrick Mahomes II; Stephen Curry	Burna Boy (Nigeria); Innoss'B (DRC); Sho Madjozi (South Africa); Dave (UK); Stormzy (UK); Ninho (France); S.Pri Noir (France)
Best New International Act
Sha Sha (Zimbabwe); Rema (Nigeria); Celeste (UK); Young T & Bugsey (UK); Hatik (France); Stacy (France)

=== Notes ===
- ^{^[a]} Brown Skin Girl makes Blue Ivy the youngest person to win a BET Award.

== Special awards ==
Humanitarian Award: Beyoncé

Shine A Light Award: Honoree Recipients: DJ D-Nice (Club Quarantine), Swizz Beatz & Timbaland (Verzuz TV)
