= Late at Night (Roddy Ricch song) =

2021 single by Roddy Ricch

Single by Roddy Ricch

from the album Live Life Fast
- Released: June 4, 2021
- Length: 2:55
- Label: Atlantic; Bird Vision
- Songwriters: Rodrick Moore, Jr.; Dijon McFarlane; Shah Rukh Zaman Khan
- Producer: Mustard

Roddy Ricch singles chronology
"Stunnaman" (2021)	"Late at Night" (2021)	"Body in Motion" (2021)

Music video
- "Late at Night" on YouTube

"Late at Night" (stylized in all lowercase) is a song by American rapper Roddy Ricch. It was released on June 4, 2021, through Atlantic Records and Bird Vision, as the lead single from his second studio album, Live Life Fast. The song serves as his first solo single in more than a year. Ricch wrote the song alongside its producer Mustard and co-producer Gylttryp. The song debuted at number 20 on the Billboard Hot 100 and number 40 on the UK Singles Chart in June 2021.

== Background ==
Prior to the release of the song, Roddy Ricch had worked with producer Mustard three times as two credited artists: Mustard's 2019 single "Ballin'", Ricch's 2020 single "High Fashion", and American singer Ty Dolla Sign's 2020 song "Real Life". On all the songs, Mustard is the producer and Gylttryp is the co-producer even though the latter has never been credited as an artist.

== Release and promotion ==
On May 10, 2021, Roddy Ricch previewed the song through his Twitter account. He announced the release date in a now-deleted post on Instagram on May 24, 2021, also revealing that Mustard would be producing the song. The cover art for the song was revealed on June 2, 2021.

== Music video ==
The official music video of the song premiered alongside the song on June 4, 2021. The accompanying visuals see him "ride Ferris wheels, teleport to gallery parties, and turn into a werewolf". It stars American actress and model Karrueche Tran as Ricch's love interest. There is also a reference to American singer Michael Jackson's 1983 song "Thriller".

== Charts ==
=== Weekly charts ===
Chart performance for "Late at Night"
Chart (2021)	Peak position
Australia (ARIA)	49
Canada Hot 100 (Billboard)	24
Global 200 (Billboard)	27
Ireland (IRMA)	38
Lithuania (AGATA)	94
New Zealand Hot Singles (RMNZ)	2
Portugal (AFP)	104
UK Singles (OCC)	40
US Billboard Hot 100	20
US Hot R&B/Hip-Hop Songs (Billboard)	6
US Rhythmic Airplay (Billboard)	1

=== Year-end charts ===
Year-end chart performance for "Late at Night"
Chart (2021)	Position
US Billboard Hot 100	72
US Hot R&B/Hip-Hop Songs (Billboard)	32
US Rhythmic (Billboard)	9

== Certifications ==
Certifications for "Late at Night"
Region	Certification	Certified units/sales
New Zealand (RMNZ)	Platinum	30,000^{‡}
United Kingdom (BPI)	Silver	200,000^{‡}
^{‡} Sales+streaming figures based on certification alone.
