= How It Is (disambiguation) =

How It Is is a novel by Irish writer Samuel Beckett

How It Is may also refer to:

- "How It Is" (song), a song by Roddy Ricch, Chip and Yxng Bane
- "How It Is (Wap Bap …)", a song by Bibi H.
- "How It Is", a song by Rush from Vapor Trails
- How It Is, a 1968 BBC television series
