= Stacy (zouk singer) =

Zouk singer from Martinique and Guyana

Stacy is a zouk singer from Martinique and Guyana who sings in French and Creole.

== Biography ==
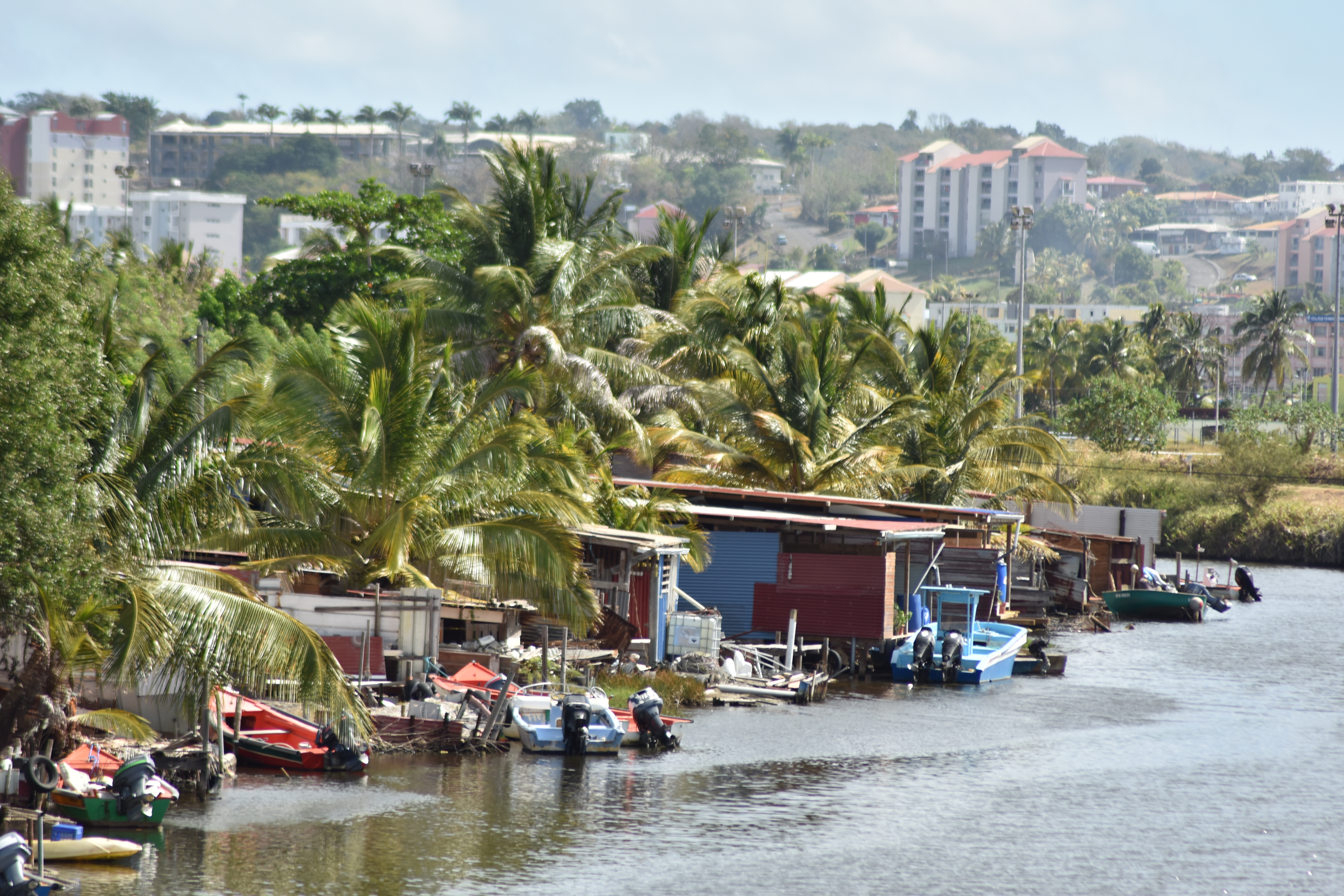
Volga-Plage, Fort-de-France

She grew up in the Volga-plage and Baie des Tourelles neighbourhoods in Fort-de-France, Martinique. Her father is also a zouk singer.

=== Career ===
Her first single recorded with Dj Creeks MX, Et sans toi was a hit, charting at number 1 in the French West Indies and Guyana in 2014; its official video has been viewed over 10 million times on YouTube.

She has made appearances on television including France 24, in the programme Le Paris des Arts en Martinique and at the Olympia Hall.

Stacy was nominated for Best New International Act at the BET awards in 2020. At the Soul Train Music Awards later that year, she performed in Creole as Soul Cypher, where guests show their talent by freestyling over an instrumental track.

Stacy has recently moved from releasing singles to creating an album with her new label, Aztec Musique, the same label who signed Edith Lefel. As of March 2022, her track Fwisson has had nearly four million views on YouTube. It inspired a number of lipsync videos; Stacy has said in an interview that she is pleased to see her work and language resonate and become better known in this way, defying an expectation that Creole language music cannot be exported from the Caribbean.

=== Album ===
2020 Sous ma plume (Aztec Musique)
