= Letter to Nipsey =

2020 tribute single to Nipsey Hussle by Meek Mill featuring Roddy Ricch

Single by Meek Mill featuring Roddy Ricch
- Released: January 27, 2020
- Length: 2:48
- Label: Atlantic; Maybach
- Songwriters: Robert Williams; Rodrick Moore, Jr.; Nikolas Papamitrou
- Producer: Papamitrou

Meek Mill singles chronology
"Thot Box" (2019)	"Letter to Nipsey" (2020)	"Believe" (2020)

Roddy Ricch singles chronology
"Tip Toe" (2019)	"Letter to Nipsey" (2020)	"The Box" (2020)

"Letter to Nipsey" is a song by American rapper Meek Mill, featuring fellow rapper Roddy Ricch. The song was produced by Papamitrou, who co-wrote it with Mill and Roddy Ricch. On January 27, 2020, the song was released for digital download and streaming as a single, through Atlantic Records and Maybach Music Group. It is a tribute to rapper Nipsey Hussle, who was shot and killed on March 31, 2019. All the proceeds from the song went to his family. Lyrically, Mill and Roddy Ricch reflect on their feelings after his death.

"Letter to Nipsey" received positive reviews from music critics, who mostly highlighted its emotional impact. Some appreciated the chemistry of Mill and Roddy Ricch, while certain reviewers praised their storytelling. In the United States, the song charted at number 73 on the Billboard Hot 100, alongside reaching number 34 on the Hot R&B/Hip-Hop Songs chart. Mill and Roddy Ricch debuted it with a performance at the 62nd Annual Grammy Awards.

== Background and composition ==
A memorial area for Nipsey Hussle at a South Los Angeles store, after his death. In the song, Mill and Roddy Ricch pay tribute to him.

Prior to American rapper Nipsey Hussle being shot and killed in Los Angeles, one of his last collaborations was the 2019 single "Racks in the Middle", featuring Roddy Ricch and record producer Hit-Boy. In December 2019, nine months after his death, Roddy Ricch said he has a portrait of the rapper in his house and the song's platinum plaque had been placed beside it. He said that "my brother is not here to share that with me" despite them collaborating on it and admitted, "Nigga, that hurt me... But at the same time, that's life." Shortly before Nipsey Hussle's death, he and Mill had begun work on a collaborative album.

Mill and Roddy Ricch were both friends with Nipsey Hussle. "Letter to Nipsey" marked the rappers' first collaboration; Mill was a contemporary of Nipsey Hussle, while Roddy Ricch was his protege. The song was produced by Papamitrou, the first producer signed to Dream Chasers. He wrote it alongside Mill and Roddy Ricch. The song was debuted by them at the 2020 Grammy Awards. At the same ceremony, "Racks in the Middle" was awarded Best Rap Performance.

In the lyrics of the song, Mill and Roddy Ricch pay tribute to Nipsey Hussle, reflecting on how they felt after his death. Mill raps about the pain of the loss in his verse, admitting that he cried tears despite not having been close friends with the rapper. He begins by referencing Nipsey Hussle's funeral at the Staples Center and former US president Barack Obama's letter for him. Roddy Ricch sings about Nipsey Hussle's personal impact on him as a fellow Angeleno on the hook, questioning his faith and admitting he cried, as his voice's tone changes. He sings and raps his verse, recalling the numbness he felt upon hearing the news, as well as offering individual condolences for those who were close to Nipsey Hussle and concluding by calling him his big brother.

== Release and promotion ==
On January 27, 2020, "Letter to Nipsey" was released for digital download and streaming as a single in various countries, through Mill's labels Atlantic and Maybach. It was announced by Mill and Atlantic that all the proceeds from the song would go to Nipsey Hussle's family. The 2020 Grammy Awards tribute to Nipsey Hussle opened with him and Roddy Ricch performing the song, during which Mill wore a blue suit. DJ Khaled, John Legend, YG, and Kirk Franklin also appeared for the tribute. After the performance, DJ Khaled transitioned into his 2019 single "Higher" with Legend and Franklin, which also features Nipsey Hussle.

== Reception ==
"Letter to Nipsey" was met with positive reviews from music critics, with general praise for its emotional impact. In a glowing review for MTV, Trey Alston described the "touching" and "stirring song" as "an intense, emotional diary entry of emotions", detailing how Mill explains the "tremendous impact" of Nipsey Hussle's death and Roddy Ricch delivers a "powerful chorus". Sheldon Pearce from Pitchfork felt that the song is equally powerful to the Grammys performance and singled out Mill's unique ability to "rap about the pain of loss", providing a verse "striking in its plainness and clarity of thought"; he also praised Roddy Ricch's feature. Charles Holmes of Rolling Stone summarized the song as "a balancing act", with the two rappers attempting "to deliver an uplifting message amid tragedy and the sobering reality" of Nipsey Hussle dying at a young age. He noted that Mill utilizes his "patented yelp" and Roddy Ricch's "melodic sensibilities anchors [sic] the hook", with his voice "dip[ping] and soar[ing]". Stereogum's Tom Breihan declared that the song aims "for heartfelt intensity rather than pop sweep", making "a worthy entry" into the tradition of rap songs dedicated to dead artists. He saw that Mill "vents passionately" about the loss, while Roddy Ricch, not "really a passionate presence, simply sing-raps" about his numbness upon receiving the news. Paul "Big Homie" Duong of Rap Radar wrote that "the heart-felt track" features the rappers reflecting on Nipsey Hussle's death and "his legacy he left behind". For Exclaim!, Sarah Murphy commented that it is covered with "poignant one-liners".

On the chart issue dated February 8, 2020, "Letter to Nipsey" entered the US Billboard Hot 100 at number 80. The following week, it rose seven places to number 73. On the US Hot R&B/Hip-Hop Songs chart, the song peaked at number 34. It further charted at number 39 on the New Zealand Hot Singles Chart.

== Credits and personnel ==
Credits adapted from Tidal.

- Meek Mill – lead vocals, songwriting
- Roddy Ricch – featured vocals, songwriting
- Papamitrou – songwriting, production
- Anthony Cruz – recording
- Chris Dennis – recording
- Derek "MixedByAli" Ali – mixing
- Zachary Acosta – assistant mixing
- Nicholas De Porcel – mastering

== Charts ==
Chart performance for "Letter to Nipsey"
Chart (2020)	Peak position
New Zealand Hot Singles (RMNZ)	39
US Billboard Hot 100	73
US Hot R&B/Hip-Hop Songs (Billboard)	34
US Rolling Stone Top 100	49

== Release history ==
Release dates and formats for "Letter to Nipsey"
Region	Date	Format(s)	Label(s)	Ref.
Various	January 27, 2020	Digital download; streaming	Atlantic; Maybach	
