= Ballin' (Mustard and Roddy Ricch song) =

2019 single by Mustard

Single by Mustard featuring Roddy Ricch

from the album Perfect Ten
- Released: August 20, 2019
- Recorded: 2018
- Genre: Hip hop; trap
- Length: 3:00
- Label: 10 Summers Records; Interscope
- Songwriters: Dijon McFarlane; Rodrick Moore, Jr.; Shah Rukh Zaman Khan; Donell Jones
- Producers: Mustard; Justus West; Gylttryp

Mustard singles chronology
"100 Bands" (2019)	"Ballin'" (2019)	"Heartless" (2019)

Roddy Ricch singles chronology
"Out tha Mud" (2019)	"Ballin'" (2019)	"Big Stepper" (2019)

Music video
- "Ballin'" on YouTube

"Ballin'" is a song by American record producer Mustard featuring American rapper Roddy Ricch. The track was released as the third single from Mustard's third studio album, Perfect Ten, on August 20, 2019, though it was available as early as the end of June 2019. The song and its accompanying video received acclaim from music critics, with Complex magazine naming it the Best Song of 2019. It peaked at number 11 on the Billboard Hot 100, marking Mustard's highest charting song in the US. The song received a nomination for Best Rap/Sung Performance at the 2020 Grammy Awards, making it the first time Ricch has been nominated for a Grammy and Mustard's first nomination as an artist.

Later in 2019, the two released another collaboration, "High Fashion".

== Background ==
Roddy Ricch revealed in an interview that the song was composed in late 2018, but Mustard wanted to keep it for his album, Perfect Ten, which he was still working on. The song was later included on the album, released in June 2019. Ricch said he knew the song was "hard enough" the first time he heard it, while Mustard proclaimed "this is going to be the one".

== Composition and lyrics ==
"Ballin'" has a "rags to riches" theme. In its intro, the song samples girl group 702's 1997 top ten hit "Get It Together".

The song features a "smooth, bouncy beat", with Roddy Ricch rapping about his come-up and ascent in the music industry.

In the first verse, Ricch salutes fellow Los Angeles rapper, the late Nipsey Hussle and his girlfriend Lauren London: "I run these racks up with my queen like London and Nip". The line simultaneously references Ricch and Hussle's collaboration "Racks in the Middle", released earlier in 2019 as Hussle's last single before his death. Billboard's Heran Mamo noted that "in typical Hussle fashion", Roddy Ricch "narrates his life's hardships before delving into his newfound treasures".

== Critical reception ==
The song was widely acclaimed by music critics. Charles Holmes of Rolling Stone magazine called it "a song of the year contender", while Complex and Billboard both named it as a "standout track" on the album. Pitchfork magazine included "Ballin'" in its list of The Best Rap Songs of 2019 and called it "the centerpiece of Mustard's underappreciated album Perfect Ten". Complex later named it the Best Song of 2019, calling it "a feel-good anthem so infectious you'll need antibiotics just to stop running it back".

== Chart performance ==
"Ballin'" was at the time Mustard's highest charting song in the US, peaking at number 11 on the Billboard Hot 100. It was also Roddy Ricch's highest charting song, until he surpassed it a week later, with the release of his album track "The Box", which eventually reached number 1 on the chart. It reached number one on Billboard's Rhythmic Songs chart, becoming Mustard's second number one following "Pure Water" and Ricch's first number one. The song also topped the Rap Airplay chart.

== Music video ==
The music video for the track was teased by Mustard on his Instagram page on September 29, 2019. The music video for the track was eventually released on October 2, 2019 to critical acclaim. The video features Mustard and Roddy Ricch driving a Lamborghini Aventador in Los Angeles, where they both are from, playing poker in a casino, and going to a strip club. This is contrasted with scenes in which Mustard and Roddy Ricch as children play cards with Monopoly money and playing with miniature toy Lamborghinis together, aspiring for wealth and luxury, representing how they went from "rags to riches". The video also pays tribute to rapper Nipsey Hussle, who had been killed a few months ago.

== Live performances ==
On December 16, 2019, Roddy Ricch performed the song live, alongside an 8-piece orchestra, at Peppermint Club in Los Angeles for Audiomack's Trap Symphony series. Along with Mustard, he performed it at The Pop Out: Ken & Friends on June 19, 2024.

== Other uses ==
The song can be heard on "Elyse's Skit", track 10 off Roddy Ricch's debut album Please Excuse Me for Being Antisocial. In the skit, which is an actual voicenote recording, the mother of a woman named Elyse sends her daughter a voicenote, with "Ballin'" playing in the background, while the mother proceeds to say "I can't get that damn song out my head", jokingly calling it "inappropriate music". Ricch called the skit "something natural".

In 2023, AI covers of the song using models based on pop culture characters and real-world celebrities gained viral popularity.

== Awards and nominations ==
62nd Annual Grammy Awards

Year	Award	Result
2020	Best Rap/Sung Performance	Nominated

== Charts ==
=== Weekly charts ===
Chart (2019–2020)	Peak position
Australia (ARIA)	72
Belgium (Ultratip Bubbling Under Flanders)	18
Canada Hot 100 (Billboard)	34
Ireland (IRMA)	42
Netherlands (Single Top 100)	98
Portugal (AFP)	30
Sweden Heatseeker (Sverigetopplistan)	1
UK Singles (OCC)	37
US Billboard Hot 100	11
US Hot R&B/Hip-Hop Songs (Billboard)	4
US Rhythmic Airplay (Billboard)	1
US Rolling Stone Top 100	7

=== Year-end charts ===
Chart (2019)	Position
US Hot R&B/Hip-Hop Songs (Billboard)	58
US Rolling Stone Top 100	81

Chart (2020)	Position
Canada (Canadian Hot 100)	83
Portugal (AFP)	98
US Billboard Hot 100	25
US Hot R&B/Hip-Hop Songs (Billboard)	21
US Rhythmic (Billboard)	10

== Certifications ==
Region	Certification	Certified units/sales
Australia (ARIA)	Platinum	70,000^{‡}
Brazil (Pro-Música Brasil)	Diamond	160,000^{‡}
Canada (Music Canada)	Platinum	80,000^{‡}
Denmark (IFPI Danmark)	Platinum	90,000^{‡}
France (SNEP)	Gold	100,000^{‡}
New Zealand (RMNZ)	3× Platinum	90,000^{‡}
Poland (ZPAV)	Gold	25,000^{‡}
Portugal (AFP)	Platinum	10,000^{‡}
United Kingdom (BPI)	Platinum	600,000^{‡}
United States (RIAA)	7× Platinum	7,000,000^{‡}
^{‡} Sales+streaming figures based on certification alone.
