= Keedron Bryant =

American singer (born 2007)

- Born: July 3, 2007 (age 19); Sicily, Italy
- Origin: Jacksonville, Florida, U.S.
- Genres: Gospel; R&B
- Occupation: Singer
- Instrument: Vocals
- Years active: 2020–present
- Label: Warner

Keedron Bryant (born July 3, 2007) is an American singer. He is best known for his 2020 protest song, "I Just Wanna Live", which earned viral popularity following the murder of George Floyd.

== Life and career ==
Keedron Bryant was born in Sicily, Italy on July 3, 2007, to Johnnetta Bryant, a minister and civilian worker for the United States Department of Defense, and Kendric Bryant, a minister and member of the United States Navy. He began singing at age 5, deciding he wanted to be a singer at age 7. He grew up in Jacksonville, Florida, performing in his church choir and in school musicals, as well as watching DVDs of gospel singers given to him by his father.

He first gained attention in mid-2019 after a video of him singing the gospel song "Brand New Life" went viral online. In 2019, he won the award for Youth Male Vocalist of the Year during the Gospel Choice Music Awards. He appeared on the fourth season of the NBC variety series Little Big Shots in May 2020, where he performed the gospel song "Oh Happy Day".

The following month, Bryant's mother wrote the breaking hit "I Just Wanna Live" one day after the murder of George Floyd in response to seeing Floyd call out for his mother. A video of Bryant singing the song a cappella was posted to YouTube and Instagram, where it quickly gained viral success, earning praise from former President Barack Obama, basketball player LeBron James, singer Janet Jackson, and actress Lupita Nyong'o. After seeing Bryant's video on television, American producer Dem Jointz released a reworked version the song, which was then discovered by the head of urban marketing at Warner Records. Bryant then signed a record contract with Warner Records through Dem Jointz's production company, UMUWWA, and released the Dem Jointz-produced version of "I Just Wanna Live" as his debut single alongside a lyric video.

Later that month, he appeared on the ABC television special Juneteenth: A Celebration of Overcoming and the virtually-held NAACP-run special Juneteenth Black Family Reunion: The Music, The Moments, The Movement to perform the song. Bryant also gave an opening performance at the 20th BET Awards and was invited to sing the national anthem during the sixth NASCAR Cup Series race of 2020. The police brutality-based music video for "I Just Wanna Live" and a remix of the song, featuring American singers Andra Day and Lucky Daye and American rapper IDK, were released in July 2020.

On September 11, 2020, Bryant released his debut EP, I Just Wanna Live, an R&B record. Also in September, Bryant released a gospel rendition of "I Just Wanna Live" alongside a music video. In October 2020, he released a cover of the Marvin Gaye song "Mercy Mercy Me (The Ecology)" for the Hollywood Records album I Can't Breathe/Music for the Movement, and appeared on the Jermaine Dupri song "Change". He released his Christmas EP, The Best Time of Year, on October 30, 2020, through Warner. On January 14, 2022, he released his third EP, Keedron, which featured his singles "Hello" and "Stubborn".

== Public image ==
Billboard included Bryant on their "21 Under 21" list in November 2020. Later that month, he was chosen as a finalist for Time Kid of the Year. "I Just Wanna Live" was selected as the top song of 2020 by Associated Press, while Esquire named "I Just Wanna Live" as one of the greatest protest songs of all time.

== Personal life ==
Bryant attended Oakleaf Junior High School in Orange Park, Florida.

== Discography ==
=== Extended plays ===
Title	Details
I Just Wanna Live	Released: September 11, 2020; Label: Warner; Format: Digital download
The Best Time of Year	Released: October 30, 2020; Label: Warner; Format: Digital download
Keedron	Released: January 14, 2022; Label: Warner; Format: Digital download

=== Singles ===
==== As lead artist ====
Title	Year	Album
"I Just Wanna Live"	2020	I Just Wanna Live
"U Got This"	2020	I Just Wanna Live
"Mercy Mercy Me (The Ecology)"	2020	I Can't Breathe/Music for the Movement
"I Know I Been Changed" (with Symba featuring Gary Clark Jr.)	2021	American Skin
"Faithful"	2023	Non-album single
"I Love You Jesus"	2024	TBA

=== Guest appearances ===
List of non-single guest appearances, showing year released, other artist(s) featured, and album name
Title	Year	Other artist(s)	Album
"Smile"	2020	Yellopain	Yello Is The New Black
