= Please Excuse Me for Being Antisocial =

Studio album by Roddy Ricch
- Released: December 6, 2019
- Recorded: 2019
- Studio: Record Plant, Los Angeles, California; Encore, Los Angeles, California; Ameraycan, Los Angeles, California; Jungle City, New York City; Glenwood Place Recording Studios, Burbank, California
- Genre: Hip hop; trap
- Length: 43:18
- Label: Bird Vision; Atlantic
- Producer: 30 Roc; ATL Jacob; Billboard Hitmakers; Datboisqueeze; DJ Shawdi P; Fabio Aguilar; Figurez Made It; Flexico; ForeignGotEm; GYLTTRYP; Jasper Harris; JetsonMade; Keanu Beats; Kember Dreams; Kid Wond3r; Kilo Keys; Mustard; Niaggi; Nils; OZ; Pilgrim; Sonic; Saint Mino; Yung Lan; Zentachi

Roddy Ricch chronology
Feed Tha Streets II (2018)	Please Excuse Me for Being Antisocial (2019)	Live Life Fast (2021)

Singles from Please Excuse Me for Being Antisocial
- 1. "Big Stepper" Released: October 11, 2019; 2. "Start wit Me" Released: October 25, 2019; 3. "Tip Toe" Released: November 25, 2019; 4. "The Box" Released: January 11, 2020; 5. "High Fashion" Released: May 19, 2020

Please Excuse Me for Being Antisocial is the debut studio album by American rapper Roddy Ricch. It was released on December 6, 2019, through Atlantic Records and Bird Vision Entertainment. It features guest appearances from Gunna, Lil Durk, Meek Mill, Mustard, Ty Dolla $ign, and A Boogie wit da Hoodie, with production handled by multiple producers including 30 Roc, ATL Jacob, JetsonMade, OZ, and Mustard. The album won Album of the Year at the 2020 BET Awards. Apple Music also named it Album of the Year, where it was 2020's most streamed album globally.

Please Excuse Me for Being Antisocial was supported by four singles: "Big Stepper", "Start wit Me" featuring Gunna, "Tip Toe" featuring A Boogie wit da Hoodie, and "High Fashion", featuring Mustard, all of which have been certified platinum or higher. Prior to being released as a single, "The Box" became Roddy Ricch's highest-charting song of his career, reaching the top of the US Billboard Hot 100; the song later became the album's fourth single. The album also received generally positive reviews from music critics and was a massive commercial success. It debuted at number one on the US Billboard 200 chart, earning 101,000 album-equivalent units in its first week. It also spent four non-consecutive weeks atop the chart, becoming the longest-running number one debut rap album since 50 Cent's Get Rich or Die Tryin' in 2003.

== Background and production ==
In an interview with Revolt, the album's audio engineer Chris Dennis uncovered some of the album's recording sessions. Dennis recalls first meeting Roddy Ricch at a studio session one a day in March 2019, where after they "just kept working ever since then" from that day on. Ricch had just returned to the US after touring with Post Malone on the European leg of Malone's Beerbongs & Bentleys Tour. Ricch's label wanted to start working on his debut album, something which Ricch also expressed interest in. Dennis says they spent a "solid year" working on the album, changing tracklists constantly and recording new music. He used production software Plugin Alliance which, he explained, "has no latency in the recording on any of the plugins". For the album, Ricch didn't want to employ a lot of effects or reverb, because "he likes his stuff really clean, dry, and in your face. That was the learning curve in the beginning — getting his clean vocals. You also have to work fast because he can record a song in 10 minutes", Dennis stated. "The Box", for instance, was recorded in roughly 15 minutes. On the track "War Baby", a choir was used, an idea Ricch came up with. The choir was arranged through Ricch's cousin.

Around 250 songs were recorded for the album. Dennis stated that a lot of those songs will instead appear on other artists' albums.

== Awards and nominations ==
Award	Year	Category	Result	Ref.
American Music Awards	2020	Favorite Album — Rap/Hip-Hop	Won	
Apple Music Awards	2020	Album of the Year	Won	
BET Awards	2020	Album of the Year	Won	
BET Hip Hop Awards	2020	Hip Hop Album of the Year	Won	
Billboard Music Awards	2020	Top Rap Album	Nominated	

== Commercial performance ==
Please Excuse Me for Being Antisocial debuted at number one on the US Billboard 200 with 101,000 album-equivalent units (including 3,000 copies as pure album sales) in its first week. This became Roddy Ricch's first number one on the chart. The album also accumulated a total of 130.7 million in on-demand audio streams for the set's songs. In its second week, the album dropped to number three on the chart, with an additional 81,000 units. In its third week, the album remained at number three on the chart, earning 73,000 more units. In its fourth week, the album climbed to number two on the chart with 74,000 units. In its fifth week, it regained the number one position on the chart, earning 97,000 album-equivalent units, with a 31% increase in total units. The album ended up spending two more weeks at number one in its eighth and tenth week. It became the longest-running number one debut rap album in the US since 50 Cent's Get Rich or Die Tryin' in 2003. On November 5, 2020, the album was certified double platinum by the Recording Industry Association of America (RIAA) for combined sales and album-equivalent units of over two million units in the United States.

Five songs off the album also managed to chart on the US Billboard Hot 100, with "The Box" being the highest-charting song, spending eleven weeks at number one on the chart despite no initial single release. Tracks from the album have sold over 20 million certified units as of January 2022.

== Reception ==
Professional ratings
Aggregate scores
Source	Rating
Metacritic	72/100
Review scores
Source	Rating
AllMusic	3.5/5 stars
HipHopDX	4/5
NME	3/5 stars
Pitchfork	6.9/10

Please Excuse Me For Being Antisocial held a 72/100 on Metacritic, indicating “generally favourable reviews”.

== Track listing ==
Credits adapted from Tidal.

No.	Title	Writer(s)	Producer(s)	Length
1.	"Intro"	Rodrick Moore, Jr.; Jacob Canady; Jonathan De La Rosa; Eduardo Burgess	ATL Jacob; Billboard Hitmakers	2:15
2.	"The Box"	Moore; Samuel Gloade; Adarius Moragne; Aqeel Tate; Larrance Dopson; Eric Sloan; Khirye Anthony Tyler	30 Roc; Datboisqueeze; Zentachi^{[b]}	3:16
3.	"Start wit Me" (featuring Gunna)	Moore; Sergio Kitchens; Tahj Morgan; Jasper Harris	JetsonMade; Harris	2:38
4.	"Perfect Time"	Moore; Eric Sandoval; Anthony Beecham	Sonic; Kid Wond3r	2:22
5.	"Moonwalkin" (featuring Lil Durk)	Moore; Durk Banks; Sandoval; Fabio Aguilar	Sonic; Aguilar; Keanu Beats	2:47
6.	"Big Stepper"	Moore; Cristian Gonzalez; Joseph Nguyen; Steven Alexander	Flexico; Figurez Made It; DJ Shawdi P	2:55
7.	"Gods Eyes"	Moore; Sandoval	Sonic	2:15
8.	"Peta" (featuring Meek Mill)	Moore; Robert Williams; Ozan Yildirim; Nils Noehden	OZ; Nils	3:18
9.	"Boom Boom Room"	Moore; Milan Modi; Brain Anamayatana; Vid Vučenović	Yung Lan; Kilo Keys; ForeignGotEm	2:47
10.	"Elyse's Skit"			0:23
11.	"High Fashion" (featuring Mustard)	Moore; Dijon McFarlane; Shahrukh Khan	Mustard; GYLTTRYP	3:40
12.	"Bacc Seat" (featuring Ty Dolla Sign)	Moore; Tyrone Griffin, Jr.; Modi	Yung Lan	2:52
13.	"Roll Dice"	Moore; Gloade; Moragne; Tate	30 Roc; Datboisqueeze; Zentachi	2:50
14.	"Prayers to the Trap God"	Moore; Sandoval; Mino Drerup	Sonic; Saint Mino^{[a]}	2:40
15.	"Tip Toe" (featuring A Boogie wit da Hoodie)	Moore; Artist Dubose; Gianni van den Brom; Beck Norling	Niaggi; Pilgrim	3:05
16.	"War Baby"	Moore; Lamar Haslam Jr; Sandoval; Ashley Kember	Sonic; Kember Dreams^{[a]}	3:15
17.	"Tell Me So" (bonus track)	Moore		2:12
Total length:				43:18

Notes

- ^{^[a]} signifies a co-producer
- ^{^[b]} signifies an additional producer

== Personnel ==
Credits adapted from Tidal:

- Chris Dennis – recording (tracks 1–9, 11–16)
- Curtis "Sircut" Bye – engineering assistant (tracks 1, 2, 4, 6–9, 11–16), mixing (track 5)
- Zachary Acosta – engineering assistant (tracks 1, 2, 4–9, 11–16)
- Cyrus "NOIS" Taghipour – mixing (tracks 1, 2, 4–9, 11–16)
- Derek "MixedByAli" Ali – mixing (tracks 1–9, 11–16)
- Nicolas de Porcel – mastering (tracks 1, 2, 4–9, 11–16)
- Mike Bozzi – mastering (track 3)

== Charts ==
=== Weekly charts ===
Weekly chart performance for Please Excuse Me for Being Antisocial
Chart (2019–2020)	Peak position
Australian Albums (ARIA)	29
Belgian Albums (Ultratop Flanders)	38
Belgian Albums (Ultratop Wallonia)	79
Canadian Albums (Billboard)	2
Danish Albums (Hitlisten)	11
Dutch Albums (Album Top 100)	3
Finnish Albums (Suomen virallinen lista)	13
French Albums (SNEP)	39
Irish Albums (IRMA)	30
Italian Albums (FIMI)	47
New Zealand Albums (RMNZ)	22
Norwegian Albums (VG-lista)	4
Swedish Albums (Sverigetopplistan)	10
Swiss Albums (Schweizer Hitparade)	68
UK Albums (OCC)	13
US Billboard 200	1
US Top R&B/Hip-Hop Albums (Billboard)	1

Chart (2026)	Position
Nigerian Albums (TurnTable)	53

=== Year-end charts ===
2020 year-end chart performance for Please Excuse Me for Being Antisocial
Chart (2020)	Position
Belgian Albums (Ultratop Flanders)	128
Canadian Albums (Billboard)	8
Danish Albums (Hitlisten)	24
Dutch Albums (Album Top 100)	16
French Albums (SNEP)	141
New Zealand Albums (RMNZ)	44
Swedish Albums (Sverigetopplistan)	29
UK Albums (OCC)	83
US Billboard 200	3
US Top R&B/Hip-Hop Albums (Billboard)	3

2021 year-end chart performance for Please Excuse Me for Being Antisocial
Chart (2021)	Position
US Billboard 200	69
US Top R&B/Hip-Hop Albums (Billboard)	42

2022 year-end chart performance for Please Excuse Me for Being Antisocial
Chart (2022)	Position
US Billboard 200	198

== Certifications ==
Certifications for Please Excuse Me for Being Antisocial
Region	Certification	Certified units/sales
Brazil (Pro-Música Brasil)	Gold	20,000^{‡}
Canada (Music Canada)	Platinum	80,000^{‡}
Denmark (IFPI Danmark)	Platinum	20,000^{‡}
France (SNEP)	Gold	50,000^{‡}
New Zealand (RMNZ)	Platinum	15,000^{‡}
United Kingdom (BPI)	Gold	100,000^{‡}
United States (RIAA)	2× Platinum	2,000,000^{‡}
^{‡} Sales+streaming figures based on certification alone.
