= Die Young (Roddy Ricch song) =

Single by Roddy Ricch

from the album Feed Tha Streets II
- Released: July 20, 2018
- Genre: Hip hop; trap
- Length: 2:41
- Label: Atlantic; Bird Vision
- Songwriters: Rodrick Moore, Jr.; London Holmes; Masamune Kudo
- Producers: London on da Track; Rex Kudo

Roddy Ricch singles chronology
"Fucc It Up" (2017)	"Die Young" (2018)	"Ricch Forever" (2018)

"Die Young" is a song by American rapper Roddy Ricch. The song was released on July 20, 2018, as the lead single from Ricch's second mixtape Feed Tha Streets II. The song is dedicated to the deceased rappers XXXTentacion, Lil Snupe, and Speaker Knockerz.

== Composition ==
Produced by London On Da Track and Rex Kudo, the song features a beat described by Rolling Stone as a "somber requiem", with "light, twinkling keys that offset its dark subject matter". It was also described as a "surging hit that comes from L.A. but sounds like a new strain of rap from the South".

== Critical reception ==
Charles Holmes of Rolling Stone described Roddy Ricch's breakout song as "triumphant", writing: "The line between rapping and singing has never been thinner, often displayed over superb, simple production. Roddy Ricch, a buzzing rapper from Compton, is the latest example of that shift."

== Music video ==
The official music video of the song was released on July 23, 2018, through Roddy Ricch's YouTube account. The music video was directed by JDFilms. As of April 2024, it has accumulated over 140 million views.

== Personnel ==
Credits adapted from Tidal.

- London On Da Track – producer, writer
- Rex Kudo – producer, writer
- William Binderup – assistant mix engineer
- Dave Kutch – masterer
- Erik Madrid – mixer
- Rodrick Moore – writer

== Charts ==
Chart (2018–2019)	Peak position
UK Singles (OCC)	84
US Billboard Hot 100	99
US Hot R&B/Hip-Hop Songs (Billboard)	38

== Certifications ==
Region	Certification	Certified units/sales
Canada (Music Canada)	Platinum	80,000^{‡}
New Zealand (RMNZ)	Gold	15,000^{‡}
United Kingdom (BPI)	Gold	400,000^{‡}
United States (RIAA)	2× Platinum	2,000,000^{‡}
^{‡} Sales+streaming figures based on certification alone.
