= Big Stepper =

Single by Roddy Ricch

from the album Please Excuse Me for Being Antisocial
- Released: October 11, 2019
- Length: 2:55
- Label: Atlantic; Bird Vision
- Songwriters: Rodrick Moore, Jr.; Cristian Gonzalez; Joseph Nguyen; Steven Alexander
- Producers: Flexico; Figurez Made It; DJ Shawdi P

Roddy Ricch singles chronology
"Ballin'" (2019)	"Big Stepper" (2019)	"Start wit Me" (2019)

"Big Stepper" is a song by American rapper Roddy Ricch. The song was released on October 11, 2019 as the lead single from Ricch's debut studio album Please Excuse Me for Being Antisocial. The song was written by Rodrick Moore, Jr., Cristian Gonzalez, Joseph Nguyen and Steven Alexander.

== Music video ==
A music video to accompany the release of "Big Stepper" was first released onto YouTube on October 11, 2019.

== Personnel ==
Credits adapted from Tidal.

- DJ Shawdi P – producer
- Flexico/Lil Mexico Beatz – producer
- Figurez Made It – producer
- Curtis "Sircut" Bye – assistant engineer
- Zachary Acosta – assistant engineer
- Nicolas De Porcel – masterer
- Cyrus "NOIS" Taghipour – mixer
- Derek "MixedByAli" Ali – mixer
- Nate Rodriguez - writer
- Cristian Gonzalez – writer
- Joseph Nguyen – writer
- Rodrick Moore – writer
- Steven Alexander – writer

== Charts ==
Chart (2019)	Peak position
New Zealand Hot Singles (RMNZ)	32
US Billboard Hot 100	98
US Hot R&B/Hip-Hop Songs (Billboard)	43
US Rolling Stone Top 100	85

== Certifications ==
Region	Certification	Certified units/sales
United States (RIAA)	Platinum	1,000,000^{‡}
^{‡} Sales+streaming figures based on certification alone.
