= Project Dreams =

Single by Marshmello and Roddy Ricch
- Released: December 7, 2018
- Genre: Hip hop
- Length: 2:47
- Label: Joytime Collective
- Songwriters: Christopher Comstock; Rodrick Moore, Jr.
- Producer: Marshmello

Marshmello singles chronology
"Bayen Habeit (In Love)" (2018)	"Project Dreams" (2018)	"Biba" (2019)

Roddy Ricch singles chronology
"Every Season" (2018)	"Project Dreams" (2018)	"Racks in the Middle" (2019)

Music video
- "Project Dreams" on YouTube

"Project Dreams" is a song by American producer Marshmello and American rapper Roddy Ricch. It was released on December 7, 2018.

== Critical reception ==
HotNewHipHop was positive about the song, and called Roddy Ricch a "young up-and-comer" that "continues to show why he's next up". Billboard called the track "an instant earworm, and it's paired with a straightforward video", saying there's "something so funky about Ricch's sing-song flow. He brings the melody to Marshmello's snare-forward, drum-machine beat. The song was featured as part of the video game MLB The Show 19 soundtrack."

== Charts ==
Chart (2018–2019)	Peak position
Belgium (Ultratip Bubbling Under Flanders)	33
Ireland (IRMA)	87
New Zealand Hot Singles (RMNZ)	20
US Bubbling Under Hot 100 (Billboard)	8
US Hot R&B/Hip-Hop Songs (Billboard)	46
US Rhythmic Airplay (Billboard)	28

== Certifications ==
Region	Certification	Certified units/sales
Canada (Music Canada)	Platinum	80,000^{‡}
New Zealand (RMNZ)	Gold	15,000^{‡}
United Kingdom (BPI)	Silver	200,000^{‡}
United States (RIAA)	Platinum	1,000,000^{‡}
^{‡} Sales+streaming figures based on certification alone.
