= Feed Tha Streets II =

Feed tha Streets II

Mixtape by Roddy Ricch
- Released: November 2, 2018
- Genres: Hip hop; trap
- Labels: Atlantic; Bird Vision
- Producers: Avedon; Beezo; CashMoneyAP; Cassius Jay; Den Beats; KBeazy; Kilo Keys; London on da Track; Paul Cabbin; Rex Kudo; Scott Storch; Sonic; Tarentino; Yung Lan

Roddy Ricch chronology
Feed tha Streets (2017)	Feed tha Streets II (2018)	Please Excuse Me for Being Antisocial (2019)

Singles from Feed tha Streets II
- 1. "Die Young" Released: July 20, 2018; 2. "Every Season" Released: October 28, 2018

Feed tha Streets II is the second mixtape by American rapper Roddy Ricch. It was released on November 2, 2018, by Atlantic Records and Bird Vision Entertainment. The mixtape includes the singles "Die Young" and "Every Season". This project is the sequel to his Feed tha Streets mixtape from 2017. The mixtape's sequel, Feed tha Streets III, was later released in 2022.

== Singles ==
"Die Young" was released as the lead single from the mixtape on July 20, 2018. The song peaked at number 99 on the US Billboard Hot 100. "Every Season" was released as the second single from the mixtape on October 28, 2018. The song did not enter the Billboard Hot 100, but peaked at number 7 on the Bubbling Under Hot 100 chart.

== Track listing ==
Credits adapted from Tidal.

No.	Title	Writer(s)	Producer(s)	Length
1.	"Feed the Streets 2 (Intro)"	Rodrick Moore, Jr.; Chance Youngblood; Keegan Bach	Tarentino; KBeazy	2:49
2.	"Faces"	Moore, Jr.; Eric Sandoval	Sonic	1:49
3.	"Nascar"	Moore, Jr.; Joshua Luellen; Tony Son	Southside; Richie Souf	2:59
4.	"Die Young"	Moore, Jr.; London Holmes; Masamune Kudo	London on da Track; Rex Kudo	2:37
5.	"Cream"	Moore, Jr.; Milan Modi; Brain Anamayatana; Denmarc Mangupag	Yung Lan; Kilo Keys; Den Beats	2:48
6.	"Can't Express"	Moore, Jr.; Sandoval	Sonic	2:48
7.	"Area Codes"	Moore, Jr.; Sandoval	Sonic	2:55
8.	"Brand New"	Moore, Jr.; Modi; Anamayatana; Paul Cabbin	Yung Lan; Kilo Keys; Cabbin	2:55
9.	"Down for Real"	Moore, Jr.; Alex Petit	CashMoneyAP	3:18
10.	"Every Season"	Moore, Jr.; Joshua Cross; Bishop Grinnage	Cassius Jay; Beezo	3:34
11.	"Down Below"	Moore; Scott Storch; Vincent van den Ende	Storch; Avedon	3:44
12.	"Day One (Outro)"	Moore, Jr.; van den Ende	Avedon	2:41

== Personnel ==
Credits adapted from Tidal.

- Dave Kutch – masterer (tracks 1–12)
- Kevin Spencer – mixer (tracks 1–3, 5–12)
- William Binderup – assistant mix engineer (track 4)
- Erik Madrid – mixer (track 4)

== Charts ==
=== Weekly charts ===
Chart (2018–19)	Peak position
Canadian Albums (Billboard)	84
Dutch Albums (Album Top 100)	67
UK Albums (Official Charts)	86
US Billboard 200	67
US Top R&B/Hip-Hop Albums (Billboard)	36

=== Year-end charts ===
Chart (2019)	Position
US Billboard 200	110
US Top R&B/Hip-Hop Albums (Billboard)	92

== Certifications ==
Region	Certification	Certified units/sales
United Kingdom (BPI)	Silver	60,000^{‡}
United States (RIAA)	Gold	500,000^{‡}
^{‡} Sales+streaming figures based on certification alone.

== Release history ==
Region	Date	Format	Label
United States	November 2, 2018	Digital download; streaming	Bird Vision Entertainment
