= Every Season =

Single by Roddy Ricch

from the album Feed Tha Streets II
- Released: October 28, 2018
- Length: 3:34
- Label: Atlantic; Bird Vision
- Songwriter(s): Rodrick Moore, Jr.; Joshua Cross; Bishop Grinnage
- Producer(s): Cassius Jay; Beezo

Roddy Ricch singles chronology
"Ricch Forever" (2018)	"Every Season" (2018)	"Project Dreams" (2018)

"Every Season" is a song by American rapper Roddy Ricch. The song was released on October 28, 2018, as the second single from Ricch's second mixtape Feed Tha Streets II. The song is produced by Cassius Jay and Beezo.

== Music video ==
The official music video for the song was released on October 28, 2018, through Roddy Ricch's YouTube account. The music video was directed by JDFilms. It has accumulated over 130 million views as of October 2020.

== Personnel ==
Credits adapted from Tidal.

- Dave Kutch – masterer
- Kevin Spencer – mixer

== Charts ==
Chart (2018)	Peak position
US Bubbling Under Hot 100 Singles (Billboard)	7
US Hot R&B/Hip-Hop Songs (Billboard)	48

== Certifications ==
Region	Certification	Certified units/sales
Canada (Music Canada)	Platinum	80,000^{‡}
New Zealand (RMNZ)	Gold	15,000^{‡}
United Kingdom (BPI)	Silver	200,000^{‡}
United States (RIAA)	Platinum	1,000,000^{‡}
^{‡} Sales+streaming figures based on certification alone.
