= How It Is (song) =

Single by Roddy Ricch, Chip, and Yxng Bane featuring The Plug
- Released: February 28, 2019
- Length: 4:37
- Label: Atlantic
- Songwriters: Rodrick Moore Jr.; Guystone Menga; Jahmaal Fyffe
- Producer: SpeakerBangerz

Roddy Ricch singles chronology
"Racks in the Middle" (2019)	"How It Is" (2019)	"Out Tha Mud" (2019)

Chip singles chronology
"Emotional" (2019)	"How it is" (2019)	"Your Story" (2019)

Yxng Bane singles chronology
"Intro (Big Wave)" (2019)	"How it is" (2019)	"Skrr" (2019)

Music video
- "How it is" on YouTube

"How It Is" is a song by American rapper Roddy Ricch and British rappers Chip and Yxng Bane. It features British record producer The Plug. The song was released on February 28, 2019. It serves as Yxng Bane's most popular song. On YouTube it is on The Plug's channel, and it is shown as his song featuring Roddy Ricch, Chip, and Yxng Bane. However, this is majorly inaccurate.The plug was the main producer in How it is.

== Background ==
The whole idea of the song was unexpected, it first happened when Ricch was in the U.K., and he ran into North London's Chip and East London's Yxng Bane. They all started talking and they decided to do a song together before Ricch went back to the U.S., the song features credited production from British record producer The Plug, alongside uncredited production from Speaker Bangerz.

== Composition ==
The song featured a melodic hook performed by Roddy Ricch who also performs the first verse. Chip and Yxng Bane perform the second and third verses along with background vocals. The song has been cited as a depressing vibe due to the beat and its melodic hook, However the three rappers rap about their past struggles and hard times growing up.

== Music video ==
A music video to accompany the release of "Young & Free" was first released onto YouTube on February 28, 2019.

== Charts ==
Chart (2019)	Peak position
UK Singles (OCC)	18

== Certifications ==
Region	Certification	Certified units/sales
United Kingdom (BPI)	Silver	200,000^{‡}
^{‡} Sales+streaming figures based on certification alone.
