= Tip Toe (Roddy Ricch song) =

Single by Roddy Ricch featuring A Boogie wit da Hoodie

from the album Please Excuse Me for Being Antisocial
- Released: November 25, 2019
- Length: 3:05
- Label: Atlantic; Bird Vision
- Songwriters: Rodrick Moore, Jr.; Artist Dubose; Gianni van den Brom; Beck Norling
- Producers: Niaggi; Pilgrim

Roddy Ricch singles chronology
"Start wit Me" (2019)	"Tip Toe" (2019)	"Letter to Nipsey" (2020)

A Boogie wit da Hoodie singles chronology
"Party" (2019)	"Tip Toe" (2019)	"Bad Vibe" (2020)

Music video
- "Tip Toe" on YouTube

"Tip Toe" is a song by American rapper and singer Roddy Ricch, featuring vocals from fellow American rapper and singer A Boogie wit da Hoodie. The song was released on November 25, 2019, as the third single from Ricch's debut studio album Please Excuse Me for Being Antisocial. The song was written by the artists alongside producers Niaggi and Pilgrim.

== Music video ==
A music video was first released onto YouTube on November 25, 2019.

== Personnel ==
Credits adapted from Tidal.

- Rodrick Moore – vocals, writer
- Artist Julius Dubose – vocals, writer
- Pilgrim – producer
- Curtis "Sircut" Bye – assistant engineer
- Zachary Acosta – assistant engineer
- Nicolas De Porcel – masterer
- Cyrus "NOIS" Taghipour – mixer
- Derek "MixedByAli" Ali – mixer
- Artist Dubose – writer
- Beck Norling – writer
- Gianni van den Brom – writer
- Niaggi – producer

== Charts ==
Chart (2019)	Peak position
Canada Hot 100 (Billboard)	71
New Zealand Hot Singles (RMNZ)	16
US Billboard Hot 100	73
US Hot R&B/Hip-Hop Songs (Billboard)	32
US Rolling Stone Top 100	40

== Certifications ==
Region	Certification	Certified units/sales
Canada (Music Canada)	Gold	40,000^{‡}
United States (RIAA)	Platinum	1,000,000^{‡}
^{‡} Sales+streaming figures based on certification alone.
