= Roddy Ricch =

American rapper (born 1998)

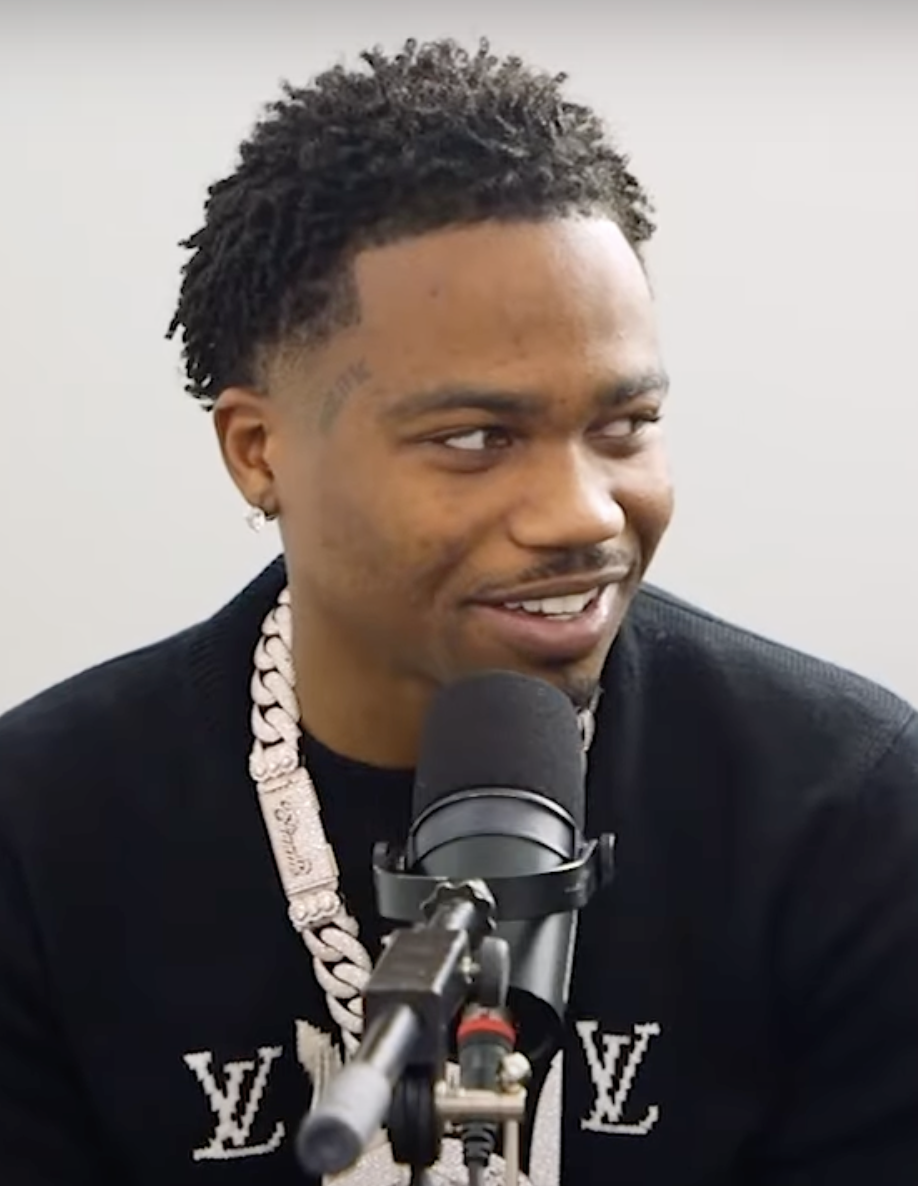
- Roddy Ricch in 2022
- Born: Rodrick Wayne Moore Jr. October 22, 1998 (age 28); Compton, California, U.S.
- Occupations: Rapper; singer; songwriter
- Years active: 2015–present
- Works: Discography
- Children: 2
- Awards: Full list
- Musical career
- Genres: Hip-hop; trap
- Labels: Atlantic; Bird Vision
- Website: roddyricchofficial.com

Rodrick Wayne Moore Jr. (born October 22, 1998), known professionally as Roddy Ricch, is an American rapper. Born and raised in Compton, California, Moore rose to fame in 2018 following the release of his song "Die Young" — which marked his first entry on the Billboard Hot 100 as a tribute to deceased rappers XXXTentacion, Lil Snupe, and Speaker Knockerz. Ricch's first two mixtapes: Feed Tha Streets (2017) and Feed Tha Streets II (2018) were both met with critical acclaim. In 2019, Ricch guest appeared alongside Hit-Boy on Nipsey Hussle's single "Racks in the Middle"—which earned him a Grammy Award for Best Rap Performance—and Mustard's single "Ballin'"—which peaked at number 11 on the Billboard Hot 100 and also received a Grammy nomination for Best Rap Performance.

Ricch signed with Atlantic Records to release his debut studio album, Please Excuse Me for Being Antisocial (2019), which debuted atop the Billboard 200—spending four non-consecutive weeks atop the chart. It spawned the single "The Box", which topped the Billboard Hot 100 for eleven consecutive weeks and received diamond certification by the Recording Industry Association of America (RIAA). The album's final single, "High Fashion" (featuring Mustard) peaked within the chart's top 20, while his guest performance on DaBaby's 2020 single "Rockstar" became his second Billboard Hot 100 number-one song. Ricch's second studio album, Live Life Fast (2021), was met with mixed critical response, also peaking at number four on the Billboard 200. Its lead single, "Late at Night", peaked within the top-20 of the Billboard Hot 100. His third studio album: The Navy Album, has been continually delayed, and has no known release date.

Ricch has won various accolades throughout his career, including a Grammy Award from ten total nominations, as well as two BET Awards, two BET Hip Hop Awards, and an American Music Award.

== Early life and education ==
Rodrick Wayne Moore Jr. was born on October 22, 1998, in Compton, California, and grew up in a Christian household. He attended Carson High School, but briefly attended Compton High School, where he played basketball. Moore started rapping when he was eight years old, and at the age of twelve, performed a freestyle for at-the-time rising artist and fellow Compton native, Kendrick Lamar. Moore began making beats in earnest when he was 16 years old. Moore also had a brief stint in county jail at the time when his second commercial mixtape: Feed Tha Streets II, was released. Moore primarily listened to Lil Wayne growing up, and additionally listened to Young Thug, Future, and Meek Mill.

== Career ==
=== 2017–2018: Commercial debut, Feed Tha Streets, and Feed Tha Streets II ===
On November 22, 2017, Ricch released his debut commercial mixtape: Feed Tha Streets, which also served as his first full-length project. The mixtape featured songs such as "Position", "Chase tha Bag", "HoodRicch", and "Fucc It Up"—among others. The mixtape caused him to garner praise from established rappers with mainstream popularity, most notably Meek Mill, Nipsey Hussle, and 03 Greedo, as well as established record producer Mustard.

In March 2018, Ricch released his debut extended play: Be 4 Tha Fame—consisting of four tracks, the EP featured a sole guest appearance from Skeme and lacked reviews from major music critics. In May 2018, rapper Nipsey Hussle brought Ricch out as his special guest at a PowerHouse concert in Los Angeles. On July 20, 2018, Ricch released the single, "Die Young", the lead single from his second commercial mixtape, Feed Tha Streets II. Ricch had written the song for a childhood friend, who was lost in a high-speed chase and said in a Genius interview he had written it the night that fellow rapper XXXTentacion had died from being shot on June 18. The song—which was dedicated, in part, to the childhood friend and its music video would go on to accumulate over 149 million views on YouTube and 220 million streams on Spotify as of February 16, 2025.

On September 27, 2018, he released the single "Ricch Forever". In October, fellow rapper Meek Mill brought Ricch out as his special guest at a PowerHouse concert in Philadelphia, in which he also gifted Ricch a "Dreamchasers" chain for appearing on his fourth studio album: Championships, in which he was co-featured alongside fellow rappers Future and Young Thug on the song "Splash Warning", which was released a few weeks later on November 30. On October 28, Ricch released the single, "Every Season", as the second single from Feed Tha Streets II—the mixtape being released on November 2, 2018. The album, which features the singles "Die Young" and "Every Season", peaked at number 67 on the Billboard 200 chart and at number 36 on the Top R&B/Hip-Hop Albums chart. On December 7, 2018, Ricch released a collaboration with DJ and producer Marshmello, titled "Project Dreams".

=== 2019–2020: Please Excuse Me for Being Antisocial, "The Box", and "Rockstar" ===
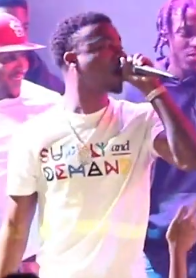
Roddy Ricch performing in 2019

On February 15, 2019, Ricch was featured alongside producer Hit-Boy on Nipsey Hussle's single "Racks in the Middle". It earned him a Grammy Award for Best Rap Performance. Exactly one month later, on March 15, he was featured alongside fellow rapper Tyga on the remix of Post Malone's 2018 single, "Wow". On May 31, 2019, Ricch released the non-album single, "Out Tha Mud". On June 28, 2019, he released a collaboration with producer Mustard on the single, "Ballin'", as part of the latter's third studio album, Perfect Ten. The song received a nomination for Best Rap/Sung Performance at the 2020 Grammy Awards.

On October 11, 2019, Ricch released the single, "Big Stepper", which served as the lead single for his debut album, Please Excuse Me for Being Antisocial. Two weeks later on October 25, 2019, he released the album's second single, "Start wit Me", which features fellow rapper Gunna. Exactly one month later, on November 25, 2019, he released the album's third single "Tip Toe", which features fellow rapper A Boogie wit da Hoodie. Please Excuse Me for Being Antisocial was released on December 6, 2019. It also features guest appearances from Lil Durk, Meek Mill, Mustard, and Ty Dolla Sign. The album debuted atop the Billboard 200 and spent four non-consecutive weeks on the chart, which became the longest running number one debut rap album in the US since Get Rich Or Die Tryin' by rapper 50 Cent in 2003.

The album contained Ricch's highest-charting single: "The Box", which was later released as the fourth single from the album on January 10, 2020, and topped the Billboard Hot 100 the following week, remaining there for eleven weeks—the longest running number-one single of 2020. On January 27, 2020, Ricch was featured on Meek Mill's single, "Letter to Nipsey", an ode to the now-late Nipsey Hussle. Ricch was also co-featured alongside rapper Gunna and producer London on da Track on A Boogie wit da Hoodie's single, "Numbers", from the latter's third studio album, Artist 2.0, which was released on February 14, 2020. On March 19, 2020, Ricch appeared on NLE Choppa's single, "Walk Em Down", which appeared on the latter's debut studio album: Top Shotta. On April 17, 2020, Ricch was featured on DaBaby's single "Rockstar", from the latter's third studio album, Blame It on Baby, which became his second number-one single on the Billboard Hot 100—spending seven weeks atop the chart, as well as reaching number one in the UK, and in several other countries. Ricch became the first artist to achieve his first two number-one singles in the same year since English singer-songwriter Ed Sheeran did so in 2017.

Ricch won Album of the Year at the 2020 BET Awards, and spent eighteen cumulative weeks atop the Hot 100 in 2020, the most weeks atop the chart for any artist that year. On May 19, 2020, Ricch's track "High Fashion", which features Mustard, was released as the fifth single from his debut album Please Excuse Me for Being Antisocial. On July 3, 2020, Ricch was featured alongside 50 Cent on Pop Smoke's posthumous single "The Woo", from Smoke's debut studio album, Shoot for the Stars, Aim for the Moon. On August 27, 2020, Ricch appeared on Cordae's single, "Gifted", a bonus track from the latter's second studio album: From a Birds Eye View (2022). On September 30, 2020, Ricch collaborated with record label Internet Money and Don Toliver on the remix of the latter two's top-10 single, "Lemonade", which the original song is also a collaboration with Gunna and features Canadian rapper Nav; the remix appeared on the complete edition of the label's debut album, B4 the Storm.

During an interview with GQ, Ricch revealed that his second studio album was completed. However, Ricch said that he "is waiting for the right time to release it". Ricch called the album "a full-blown masterpiece. A real idea. A real body of work". On November 24, 2020, he teased towards a potential upcoming project titled Love Is Barely Real Anymore. Ricch tied Canadian singer The Weeknd for being the most nominated artist at the 2020 American Music Awards, both receiving eight nominations. Ricch then would receive six nominations at the 63rd Annual Grammy Awards, including for Song of the Year and Record of the Year for "The Box" and "Rockstar", respectively. Variety named him Breakthrough Artist of 2020, and Apple Music awarded him Album and Song of the Year in 2020, with Please Excuse Me for Being Antisocial and "The Box" respectively being the most-streamed album and song of the year globally on the platform. He was ranked third on the Billboard Year-End chart for Top Artists.

=== 2021–2023: Live Life Fast and Feed Tha Streets III ===
On March 14, 2021, Ricch performed an unreleased song called "Heartless", and his song "The Box"—which he debuted at the 63rd Annual Grammy Awards. On April 2, Ricch released a collaboration with fellow rapper 42 Dugg, titled "4 Da Gang"—which appeared as the lead single from the latter's commercial mixtape, Free Dem Boyz. Ricch was also featured alongside singer Bryson Tiller and rapper Lil Baby on DJ Khaled's single "Body in Motion", from the latter's self-titled twelfth studio album: Khaled Khaled, which was released on April 30. On May 21, 2021, Ricch released a collaboration with fellow rapper Birdman, titled "Stunnaman", which features rapper Lil Wayne. On June 4, 2021, Ricch released the single, "Late at Night"—the lead single from his second studio album, Live Life Fast. On October 1, 2021, Ricch released a collaboration with fellow rapper Bino Rideaux, titled "Lemme Find Out". On December 3, 2021, Ricch also joined Gunna and Future on a remix of their single, "Too Easy"—which appeared on Gunna's third studio album, DS4Ever.

On September 14, 2021, Ricch posted a story to his Instagram, in which he revealed the album title—he then used the album title again on social media posts a couple days later. On November 30, in preparation for the release of the album, Ricch deleted all his previous posts from Instagram and announced the release date and revealed its cover art the following day. The album, Live Life Fast was released on December 17, 2021, and featured guest appearances from Future, Kodak Black, 21 Savage, Takeoff, Jamie Foxx, Ty Dolla Sign, Alex Isley, Fivio Foreign, Lil Baby, and Gunna. Performing moderately on the Billboard 200 compared to his previous release, the album was met with predominantly mixed reviews from fans and critics alike—with some music outlets categorizing the album as a sophomore slump.

On April 15, 2022, Ricch released a collaboration with fellow rapper Fredo Bang, titled "Last Ones Left". On May 12, 2022, Ricch was featured on Post Malone's single, "Cooped Up", which appeared on the latter's fourth studio album, Twelve Carat Toothache. On June 24, 2022, Ricch released The Big 3, his second extended play and his first since 2018. On September 8, 2022, Ricch released the single "Ghetto Superstar", which features fellow rappers G Herbo and Doe Boy. On September 15, 2022, Ricch was featured on the song "Never Change"—by fellow rapper Symba.

On September 30, 2022, Ricch released the single "Stop Breathing"—the lead single from his third mixtape: Feed Tha Streets III. On October 21, 2022—Ricch released the single "Aston Martin Truck". The following day—on October 22, 2022, Ricch announced the release date and revealed the cover art for his at-the-time upcoming third mixtape, Feed Tha Streets III. On November 14, 2022, Ricch featured fellow rapper Lil Durk on a new single he released, titled "Twin". On November 18, 2022, Feed Tha Streets III—the third mixtape by Ricch was released, consisting of guest appearances from Lil Durk and Ty Dolla Sign, the mixtape debuted at number 14 on the Billboard 200 after early predictions and also spent the following week on the chart.

On March 10, 2023, Ricch was featured on the single "Passionate" by rapper Blxst, the track appears on Just for Clarity 2, an extended play by Blxst. On March 24, 2023, Ricch collaborated with Internet Money and Kodak Black on their single "I Remember". On May 5, 2023, Ricch was featured alongside Nardo Wick on Gucci Mane's single "Pissy"—which became the third single from his sixteenth studio album, Breath of Fresh Air. On June 9, 2023, Ricch was featured on the song "TRX", by rapper Rob49, the track appeared on the latter's sixth mixtape, 4GOD ll. On August 11, 2023, Ricch and fellow rapper Trippie Redd released their single "Closed Doors", the song later appeared on the latter's fifth mixtape, A Love Letter to You 5. On November 9, 2023, Ricch and fellow singer Rosemarie released a collaborative single titled "Is It Real".

=== 2024–present: The Navy Album ===
On May 10, 2024, Ricch was featured on the track "Let It Breathe", from the album One of Wun by fellow rapper Gunna. On May 31, 2024, Ricch released the single "Survivor's Remorse", which is rumored to be the lead single for his upcoming third studio album The Navy Album. On June 27, 2024, Ricch released the single "911". On July 22, 2024, Ricch and fellow singer Ella Mai were featured on the promotional single "One Bad Decision" by record producer Mustard from his fourth studio album, Faith of a Mustard Seed. After Faith of a Mustard Seed was released on July 26, 2024—Ricch additionally featured on the song "Truth Is". On November 22, 2024, Ricch was featured alongside fellow rappers WallieTheSensei and Siete7x on the song "Dodger Blue", from fellow rapper Kendrick Lamar's sixth studio album GNX. Notably on the December 7, 2024 issued Billboard Hot 100, Ricch charted on the issue for the first time since 2022 when "Dodger Blue" debuted at number eleven on the chart. On December 6, 2024, Ricch released the single "Lonely Road", which features vocals from fellow musician Terrace Martin.

== Artistry ==
I feel like the problem with us nowadays is we want everything right now. But the music isn't gonna be progressive when you're putting something out every three months, because you ain't been through nothing; you still feel like how you felt when you [last] dropped the music. To me, stuff doesn't happen in my life every single day. Maybe for some people it does, but my life don't happen that fast. I have to give myself time to actually go through things so I can speak on it, and have a new understanding of life. It's not like I make music that's not my life, so I feel like I need to give my life time to inspire me.

— Ricch in an interview with Variety, 2020.

On the transcending themes of his music, Ricch draws inspiration from his life, stating: "As I experience life, my music is going to evolve. At the same time, I still do tell the stories from my world because there are unlimited stories and unlimited people from that place. I'll always represent them. As my life begins to change and I do different things, I still want to be able to tap in and relate to them". Cady Lang of Time magazine noted Ricch's "remarkable musical style as a rapper combines his West Coast [hip hop] roots with the sound of trap music and Chicago drill rap, which gets an extra gravitas with his lyrics that range from pondering the tough realities of life to bouts of uninhibited bravado". Ricch has been recognized for his raspy voice "that works wonders with vocal filters". Paul Thompson of Vulture called Ricch "an undeniably talented vocalist and occasionally a compelling songwriter", opining how he "frequently adopts the same syntax and vocal intonations as Young Thug". His music style blends rapping and singing. Ricch has cited Kendrick Lamar, who is also from his hometown of Compton, as a musical influence. He has stated that rapper Speaker Knockerz is his biggest influence, along with the "basis" of his music coming from him. Ricch also credits Young Thug, Future, and Gucci Mane as influences.

== Personal life ==
In April 2020, Roddy Ricch's then-girlfriend Allie Minati gave birth to their son.

== Legal issues ==
In August 2019, Roddy Ricch was arrested for felony domestic violence but the charges were later dropped due to insufficient evidence. On June 11, 2022, Ricch was arrested on weapon charges after he and members of his crew were stopped at a security checkpoint near Citi Field prior to his Governors Ball set; law enforcement found a loaded firearm, additional ammunition, and a large-capacity magazine. The charges however were dropped.

== Discography ==
Studio albums

- Please Excuse Me for Being Antisocial (2019)
- Live Life Fast (2021)
- The Navy Album (TBA)

== Filmography ==
=== Film ===
Year	Title	Role	Ref.
2025	Sneaks	The Forger (voice)	

== Awards and nominations ==
Award	Year	Recipient(s) and nominee(s)	Category	Result	Ref.
American Music Awards	2020	Himself	Artist of the Year	Nominated	
American Music Awards	2020	Himself	New Artist of the Year	Nominated	
American Music Awards	2020	Himself	Favorite Male Artist — Rap/Hip-Hop	Nominated	
American Music Awards	2020	"Rockstar" (with DaBaby)	Collaboration of the Year	Nominated	
American Music Awards	2020	"The Box"	Favorite Song — Pop/Rock	Nominated	
American Music Awards	2020	Please Excuse Me for Being Antisocial	Favorite Album — Rap/Hip-Hop	Won	
American Music Awards	2020	"The Box"	Favorite Song — Rap/Hip-Hop	Nominated	
American Music Awards	2020	"Rockstar" (with DaBaby)	Favorite Song — Rap/Hip-Hop	Nominated	
Apple Music Awards	2020	Please Excuse Me for Being Antisocial	Album of the Year	Won	
Apple Music Awards	2020	"The Box"	Song of the Year	Won	
BET Awards	2020	Please Excuse Me for Being Antisocial	Album of the Year	Won	
BET Awards	2020	Himself	Best Male Hip-Hop Artist	Nominated	
BET Awards	2020	Himself	Best New Artist	Won	
BET Awards	2020	"The Box"	Video of the Year	Nominated	
BET Awards	2020	"The Box"	Viewer's Choice Award	Nominated	
BET Hip Hop Awards	2019	Himself	Best New Hip Hop Artist	Nominated	
BET Hip Hop Awards	2019	Feed Tha Streets II	Best Mixtape	Nominated	
BET Hip Hop Awards	2020	Himself	Hip Hop Artist of the Year	Nominated	
BET Hip Hop Awards	2020	Himself	Best Live Performer	Nominated	
BET Hip Hop Awards	2020	"Rockstar" (with DaBaby)	Best Hip Hop Video	Nominated	
BET Hip Hop Awards	2020	"The Box"	Best Hip Hop Video	Nominated	
BET Hip Hop Awards	2020	"Rockstar" (with DaBaby)	Song of the Year	Nominated	
BET Hip Hop Awards	2020	"The Box"	Song of the Year	Won	
BET Hip Hop Awards	2020	Please Excuse Me for Being Antisocial	Hip Hop Album of the Year	Won	
BET Hip Hop Awards	2020	"Rockstar" (with DaBaby)	Best Collaboration	Nominated	
BET Hip Hop Awards	2020	"Ballin'" (with Mustard)	Best Collaboration	Nominated	
BET Hip Hop Awards	2020	"Rockstar" (with DaBaby)	Sweet 16: Best Featured Verse	Nominated	
BET Hip Hop Awards	2020	"Rockstar (BLM Remix)" (with DaBaby)	Impact Track	Nominated	
BET Hip Hop Awards	2021	"Lemonade (Remix)" (Internet Money feat. Don Toliver & Roddy Ricch)	Sweet 16: best featured verse	Nominated	
BET Hip Hop Awards	2021	"Late At Night,"	Song of the year	Nominated	
Billboard Music Awards	2020	Please Excuse Me for Being Antisocial	Top Rap Album	Nominated	
Billboard Music Awards	2020	Himself	Best New Artist	Nominated	
Billboard Music Awards	2020	Himself	Top Rap Artist	Nominated	
Billboard Music Awards	2021	"Rockstar" (with DaBaby)	Top Collaboration	Nominated	
Billboard Music Awards	2021	"Rockstar" (with DaBaby)	Top Streaming Song	Won	
Billboard Music Awards	2021	"Rockstar" (with DaBaby)	Top Hot 100 Song	Nominated	
Billboard Music Awards	2021	"Rockstar" (with DaBaby)	Top Rap Song	Won	
BMI R&B & Hip Hop Awards	2021	Himself	Songwriter of the Year	Won	
BMI R&B & Hip Hop Awards	2021	Ballin	Most Performed Songs	Won	
BMI R&B & Hip Hop Awards	2021	High Fashion	Most Performed Songs	Won	
BMI R&B & Hip Hop Awards	2021	Rockstar	Most Performed Songs	Won	
BMI R&B & Hip Hop Awards	2021	The Box	Most Performed Songs	Won	
BMI R&B & Hip Hop Awards	2021	The Woo	Most Performed Songs	Won	
Grammy Awards	2020	"Ballin'" (with Mustard)	Best Rap/Sung Performance	Nominated	
Grammy Awards	2020	"Racks in the Middle" (with Nipsey Hussle and Hit-Boy)	Best Rap Performance	Won	
Grammy Awards	2020	"Racks in the Middle" (with Nipsey Hussle and Hit-Boy)	Best Rap Song	Nominated	
Grammy Awards	2021	"The Box"	Best Rap Song	Nominated	
Grammy Awards	2021	"The Box"	Song of the Year	Nominated	
Grammy Awards	2021	"The Box"	Best Melodic Rap Performance	Nominated	
Grammy Awards	2021	"Rockstar" (with DaBaby)	Best Melodic Rap Performance	Nominated	
Grammy Awards	2021	"Rockstar" (with DaBaby)	Record of the Year	Nominated	
Grammy Awards	2021	"Rockstar" (with DaBaby)	Best Rap Song	Nominated	
Grammy Awards	2022	Donda – Kanye West (as a featured artist)	Album of the Year	Nominated	
iHeartRadio Music Awards	2021	Himself	Male Artist of the Year	Nominated	
iHeartRadio Music Awards	2021	Himself	Hip-Hop Artist of the Year	Won	
iHeartRadio Music Awards	2021	Himself	Best New Hip-Hop Artist	Won	
iHeartRadio Music Awards	2021	"Rockstar" (with DaBaby)	Song of the Year	Nominated	
iHeartRadio Music Awards	2021	"Rockstar" (with DaBaby)	Hip-Hop Song of the Year	Nominated	
iHeartRadio Music Awards	2021	"The Box"	Hip-Hop Song of the Year	Won	
iHeartRadio Music Awards	2021	"High Fashion" (featuring Mustard)	Hip-Hop Song of the Year	Nominated	
MOBO Awards	2020	Himself	Best International Act	Nominated	
MTV Europe Music Awards	2020	Himself	Best New	Nominated	
MTV Europe Music Awards	2020	Himself	Best Hip-Hop	Nominated	
MTV Europe Music Awards	2020	"The Box"	Best Song	Nominated	
MTV Europe Music Awards	2020	"Rockstar" (with DaBaby)	Best Song	Nominated	
MTV Europe Music Awards	2020	"Rockstar" (with DaBaby)	Best Collaboration	Nominated	
MTV Video Music Awards	2020	Himself	PUSH Best New Artist	Nominated	
MTV Video Music Awards	2020	"The Box"	Song of the Year	Nominated	
MTV Video Music Awards	2020	"The Box"	Best Hip-Hop	Nominated	
MTV Video Music Awards	2020	"Rockstar" (with DaBaby)	Song of Summer	Nominated	
MTV Video Music Awards	2020	"The Woo" (with Pop Smoke and 50 Cent)	Song of Summer	Nominated	
People's Choice Awards	2020	Himself	The New Artist of 2020	Nominated	
People's Choice Awards	2020	"Rockstar" (with DaBaby)	The Song of 2020	Nominated	
People's Choice Awards	2020	"Rockstar" (with DaBaby)	The Collaboration of 2020	Nominated	
Soul Train Music Awards	2020	"The Box"	Rhythm & Bars Award	Nominated	
Soul Train Music Awards	2020	"Rockstar" (with DaBaby)	Rhythm & Bars Award	Nominated	
Variety's Hitmakers	2020	Himself	Breakthrough Artist of the Year	Won	

== See also ==
- List of artists who reached number one in the United States
- List of people from Compton, California
