= Start wit Me =

2019 single by Roddy Ricch featuring Gunna

Single by Roddy Ricch featuring Gunna

from the album Please Excuse Me for Being Antisocial
- Released: October 25, 2019
- Length: 2:38
- Label: Atlantic; Bird Vision
- Songwriters: Rodrick Moore, Jr.; Sergio Kitchens; Tahj Morgan; Jasper Harris
- Producers: jetsonmade; Harris

Roddy Ricch singles chronology
"Big Stepper" (2019)	"Start wit Me" (2019)	"Tip Toe" (2019)

Gunna singles chronology
"First Class" (2019)	"Start wit Me" (2019)	"Hot" (2019)

Music video
- "Start wit Me" on YouTube

"Start wit Me" is a song by American rapper Roddy Ricch, featuring vocals from fellow American rapper Gunna. The song was released as the second single from Ricch's debut studio album, Please Excuse Me for Being Antisocial, on October 25, 2019. The song was written by the artists and the producers jetsonmade and Jasper Harris.

== Composition and lyrics ==
The song's beat has been compared to that of American rapper DaBaby's sound. Lyrically, Ricch "tweaks cliches just enough to stay unpredictable", rapping about his extravagant lifestyle and his "brand new draco", with him and Gunna throwing warning shots to any opposers threatening to step to them.

== Critical reception ==
Upon its release, Pitchfork named it the "New Rap Song of the Day", with the magazine's Sheldon Pearce praising producer JetsonMade's flute line and "caroming drums that elevate the song".

== Music video ==
A music video to accompany the release of "Start wit Me" was first released onto YouTube on October 28, 2019. It was directed by Spike Jordan and shot in California, giving off "street vibes with various foreign cars, guns, and girls". According to Heran Mamo of Billboard, the video "depicts the real-life peril a neighborhood like Ricch's Compton hometown regularly goes through when a group plots and carries out; a drive-by shooting on another [group], juxtaposing the resulting bloodshed with the local kids' sidewalk chalk drawings". Conversely, Mamo further noted, Ricch "feels richer than ever in the cinematic clip, as he sits atop a Rolls-Royce (coincidentally with the star's same initials) and brags about his new guns and designer jewels alike".

== Live performances ==
On December 16, 2019, Roddy Ricch performed the song live, alongside an 8-piece orchestra, at Peppermint Club in Los Angeles for Audiomack's Trap Symphony series.

== Personnel ==
Credits adapted from Tidal.

- Roddy Ricch – vocals, songwriting
- Gunna – vocals, songwriting
- jetsonmade – production, songwriting
- Jasper Harris – production, songwriting
- Derek "MixedByAli" Ali – mixing
- Mike Bozzi – mastering

== Charts ==
=== Weekly charts ===
Chart (2019–2020)	Peak position
Canada (Canadian Hot 100)	63
New Zealand Hot Singles (RMNZ)	37
US Billboard Hot 100	56
US Hot R&B/Hip-Hop Songs (Billboard)	25
US Rolling Stone Top 100	23

=== Year-end charts ===
Chart (2020)	Position
US Hot R&B/Hip-Hop Songs (Billboard)	86

== Certifications ==
Region	Certification	Certified units/sales
Canada (Music Canada)	Platinum	80,000^{‡}
United States (RIAA)	2× Platinum	2,000,000^{‡}
^{‡} Sales+streaming figures based on certification alone.
