= High Fashion (Roddy Ricch song) =

2020 single by Roddy Ricch featuring Mustard

Single by Roddy Ricch featuring Mustard

from the album Please Excuse Me for Being Antisocial
- Released: May 19, 2020
- Recorded: 2019
- Genre: West Coast hip-hop
- Length: 3:40
- Label: Atlantic; Bird Vision
- Songwriters: Rodrick Moore, Jr.; Dijon McFarlane; Shahrukh Khan
- Producers: Mustard; GYLTTRYP

Roddy Ricch singles chronology
"Rockstar" (2020)	"High Fashion" (2020)	"The Woo" (2020)

Mustard singles chronology
"Bammer" (2020)	"High Fashion" (2020)	"By Yourself" (2021)

"High Fashion" is a song by American rapper Roddy Ricch, featuring production from Mustard. The song was released on May 19, 2020, as the fifth single from Ricch's debut studio album, Please Excuse Me for Being Antisocial (2019). It marks Ricch and Mustard's second collaboration, following the Grammy-nominated single "Ballin'".

A love song, "High Fashion" incorporates 90s R&B, with Ricch employing high-pitched vocals, which were compared to the work of Young Thug. The song topped four Billboard charts: R&B/Hip-Hop Airplay, Rap Airplay, Rhythmic Songs and the Mainstream R&B/Hip-Hop chart.

== Composition ==
"High Fashion" is a piano-driven West Coast hip hop song influenced by 90s R&B. According to NME, it is "a loating thug-love song" that comprises "tranquiliser-like" piano chords, which "float atop lofty 808s and snare." Lyric-wise, Ricch "devotes his lyrics to a fashionable love interest that has held him down both in the streets and in bed. Roddy chooses to spoil his lover while serenading her with memorable hook and witty verses". As noted by Billboard's Heran Mamo, Ricch "raps about his girl's favorite designers that he uniquely abbreviates while name-dropping other brands throughout the track".

== Critical reception ==
In NME, Kyann-Sian Williams opined that Mustard's production "will put you under a spell", while Ricch's high-pitched vocal "works a charm" on the song. Josh Svetz of HipHopDX noticed that the song features "2010s trap love song vibe and an instantly recitable hook" that "soundtracks the slow and sensual grind session at the club, while not losing radio-friendly appeal." Svetz further commented that Ricch "hits the notes only Young Thug would dare try, yet never comes off as biting Jeffrey's signature style." In Pitchfork, Pierre Alphonse also compared it to Young Thug's work "so egregious that it probably could have been generated by an AI, but he sings his heart out."

== Chart performance ==
"High Fashion" marked Roddy Ricch's third number-one on Billboard's Rap Airplay, Rhythmic Songs and Mainstream R&B/Hip-Hop charts, topping those charts simultaneously on June 13, 2020. It followed "The Box", and another Mustard collaboration, 2019's "Ballin'". On the R&B/Hip-Hop Airplay chart, it became his second leader, after "The Box", while it marked Mustard's third consecutive Rhythmic number-one, following "Ballin'" and "Pure Water".

== Music video ==
On May 7, 2020, Ricch teased the song's video, tweeting "who wanna be in the high fashion video?". The video however never happened.

== Personnel ==
Credits adapted from Tidal.

- GYLTTRYP – producer
- Dijon McFarlane – producer, featured artist, writer
- Curtis "Sircut" Bye – assistant engineer
- Zachary Acosta – assistant engineer
- Nicolas De Porcel – master
- Cyrus "NOIS" Taghipour – mixer
- Derek "MixedByAli" Ali – mixer
- Chris Dennis – recorded by
- Roddy Ricch – vocals, writer
- Shahrukh Zaman Khan – writer

== Charts ==
=== Weekly charts ===
Chart (2020)	Peak position
Australia (ARIA)	63
Canada Hot 100 (Billboard)	30
Ireland (IRMA)	48
Netherlands (Single Top 100)	91
New Zealand Hot Singles (RMNZ)	25
Portugal (AFP)	57
Sweden Heatseeker (Sverigetopplistan)	7
UK Singles (Official Charts)	45
US Billboard Hot 100	20
US Hot R&B/Hip-Hop Songs (Billboard)	12
US Rhythmic Airplay (Billboard)	1
US Rolling Stone Top 100	5

=== Year-end charts ===
Chart (2020)	Position
Canada (Canadian Hot 100)	75
US Billboard Hot 100	40
US Hot R&B/Hip-Hop Songs (Billboard)	22
US Rhythmic (Billboard)	6

== Certifications ==
Region	Certification	Certified units/sales
Australia (ARIA)	Gold	35,000^{‡}
Brazil (Pro-Música Brasil)	Gold	20,000^{‡}
Canada (Music Canada)	Platinum	80,000^{‡}
New Zealand (RMNZ)	Platinum	30,000^{‡}
Portugal (AFP)	Platinum	10,000^{‡}
United Kingdom (BPI)	Gold	400,000^{‡}
United States (RIAA)	4× Platinum	4,000,000^{‡}
^{‡} Sales+streaming figures based on certification alone.
