= Racks in the Middle =

Single by Nipsey Hussle featuring Roddy Ricch and Hit-Boy
- Released: February 15, 2019
- Recorded: 2018
- Genre: West Coast hip hop
- Length: 3:53
- Label: All Money In; Atlantic
- Songwriter(s): Ermias Asghedom; Rodrick Moore Jr.; Chauncey Hollis Jr.; Dustin James Corbett; Greg Allen Davis
- Producer(s): Hit-Boy

Nipsey Hussle singles chronology
"Perfect Timing" (2018)	"Racks in the Middle" (2019)	"Higher" (2019)

Roddy Ricch singles chronology
"Project Dreams" (2018)	"Racks in the Middle" (2019)	"How It Is" (2019)

Music video
- "Racks In The Middle (feat. Roddy Ricch & Hit-Boy)" on YouTube

"Racks in the Middle" is a song by American rapper Nipsey Hussle featuring fellow American rapper Roddy Ricch and American record producer Hit-Boy, released on February 15, 2019, through All Money In and Atlantic Records. It is the last single Hussle released during his lifetime, as he was shot dead on March 31, 2019. The song received nominations for Best Rap Song and Best Rap Performance at the 62nd Annual Grammy Awards, winning the latter. The award marked Hussle's first Grammy win, with his family and his partner Lauren London accepting the award on his behalf.

== Background ==
In an interview, Roddy Ricch said the song was initially only a collaboration between him and the song's producer Hit-Boy. He said Nipsey Hussle then heard the song and said he wanted it. Ricch recalls not liking the song at first, but putting his trust in Hussle who later claimed that "the streets are going to feel that shit".

== Critical reception ==
Rolling Stone called the track atypical of Hussle's discography, saying his collaboration with Ricch and Hit-Boy resulted in a "more radio-friendly sound", but with "radical honesty" in its lyrics, which detail Hussle speaking to rap artist Tee Ran.

== Music video ==
The music video was released to Hussle's YouTube channel on February 22, 2019, a week after the song's release, and features Hussle and Ricch rapping in front of women, various locations and luxury cars. Analysis of the video seems to show he's speaking to someone directly as said by him in his famous interview with Rap Genius, Billboard described the video as "lavish".

== Commercial performance ==
Following Hussle's death, his music sales increased by close to 3,000% and his streams increased by 1,773% in the United States, with "Racks in the Middle" accumulating 3,000 units, or 11.8 million streams. This led to the song being one of four songs by the rapper to posthumously debut on the Billboard Hot 100, with "Racks in the Middle" becoming his highest-charting as a lead artist.

== Charts ==
=== Weekly charts ===
Chart (2019)	Peak position
Canada (Canadian Hot 100)	47
Ireland (IRMA)	70
New Zealand Hot Singles (RMNZ)	15
Slovakia (Singles Digitál Top 100)	93
UK Singles (OCC)	59
US Billboard Hot 100	26
US Hot R&B/Hip-Hop Songs (Billboard)	11

=== Year-end charts ===
Chart (2019)	Position
US Hot R&B/Hip-Hop Songs (Billboard)	71

== Certifications ==
Region	Certification	Certified units/sales
Canada (Music Canada)	Platinum	80,000^{‡}
New Zealand (RMNZ)	Gold	15,000^{‡}
United Kingdom (BPI)	Silver	200,000^{‡}
United States (RIAA)	Platinum	1,000,000^{‡}
^{‡} Sales+streaming figures based on certification alone.
