= The Box (Roddy Ricch song) =

2020 single by Roddy Ricch

Single by Roddy Ricch

from the album Please Excuse Me for Being Antisocial
- Released: January 11, 2020
- Recorded: 2019
- Genre: Hip hop; trap
- Length: 3:16
- Label: Atlantic; Bird Vision
- Songwriters: Rodrick Moore, Jr.; Samuel Gloade; Adarius Moragne; Aqeel Tate; Larrance Dopson; Eric Sloan; Khirye Anthony Tyler
- Producers: 30 Roc; Datboisqueeze; Zentachi

Roddy Ricch singles chronology
"Letter to Nipsey" (2019)	"The Box" (2020)	"Walk Em Down" (2020)

Music video
- "The Box" on YouTube

"The Box" is a song by American rapper Roddy Ricch, originally released on December 6, 2019 as the second track from his debut studio album Please Excuse Me for Being Antisocial, before released as the fourth single on January 11, 2020. Prior to the song being released as a single, it became Roddy Ricch's highest-charting song worldwide, spending eleven weeks at number one on the US Billboard Hot 100, as well as topping the charts in Canada, New Zealand, Hungary, and peaking at number two in both the UK and Ireland. The song received critical acclaim, with praise for Ricch's vocal delivery. Its popularity on social media apps is credited to Ricch's iconic "eee err" ad-lib. A music video was released on February 28, 2020, directed by Ricch.

In the US, "The Box" was the biggest song of the final half of 2019, selling 4.7 million equivalent units as of July 2, 2020. Apple Music named it Song of the Year. It received three nominations at the 63rd Annual Grammy Awards: Best Rap Song, Best Melodic Rap Performance, and Song of the Year. It was Billboard magazine's number-one rap song of 2020, taking the top spot it's Year-End Hot Rap Songs of 2020. It also took the number-two spot on the Billboard Year-End Hot R&B/Hip-Hop Songs of 2020, being held from the top spot by The Weeknd's "Blinding Lights."

== Background and composition ==
"The Box" was the last song Ricch made for Please Excuse Me for Being Antisocial. It was recorded in roughly 15 minutes in the early morning hours in New York after Ricch had been recording all night. The song begins with a "triumphant introduction that amounts to an orchestral swell", which many listeners attributed to as a sample of the intro on "Love Sex Magic" by Ciara. However, the song's producer, 30 Roc, has insisted that though similar, the "swell" is not a sample of "Love Sex Magic", explaining: "It is not a sample. It's really a VST [plug-in] using Omnisphere [production software]." Ricch said he decided to place "The Box" as track two on the album, because "it just bangs [and] the 808s hit so hard".

The song's intro contains a "squeaky sound", known as the "eee err" sound, which is also heard throughout the rest of the song. According to Atlantic Records A&R Keefa Black, after the song was finished, Ricch said "Wait let me add something", and came up with the sound himself. Speaking on where the inspiration for the sound came from, he said "I seen Michael Jackson do it...That's what made me want to do it. Cause he was in the studio one time and he was talking about some song that he made but he started beatboxing and he said he put that in the beat". The squeaky sound has inspired many memes online. Musicologist and Northeastern University professor of music Andrew Mall said the "eee err" sound is not exactly the most interesting component of the song's beat, instead pointing out Ricch's skill as a songwriter: "I'm really taken by the atmospheric synths that underpin the track and provide the central harmonic component, particularly since there is no bass to speak of aside from a pitched bass drum sample". Regarding Ricch's craft as a writer, Mall noted "the fact that he retains writing credit here and on several other tracks that are charting, including those where he is a featured artist, speaks to a strong business savvy on his part".

Vulture's Paul Thompson said Ricch "raps with verve", calling the song "strange and eccentric", while noting Ricch's vocal versatility in the song, writing, he "moves easily between vocal modes, sounding defiant ('I won't ever sell my soooooouuuuuullllll, and I can back that'), conspiratorial (''Got a bitch that's looking like Aaliyah — she a model''), or playful — like when he cackles unnervingly at the beginning of the second verse". The song's title has been noted as being a possible reference to jail ("the box" being a slang term for "jail")., "The Box" is played in the tempo of 117 BPM and key signature of B♭ minor with a time signature of 4/4 in common time.

== Critical reception ==
The song was acclaimed by music critics. Along with the tracks "Boom Boom Room" and "Start wit Me" featuring Gunna, Darryl Robertson of Vibe felt that "The Box" is "further proof that the Atlantic Records-signee can pen addictive radio-friendly records". Josh Svetz of HipHopDX echoed a similar sentiment, writing that "The appeal to Roddy is simple; the kid can write a hell of a hook. Whether it's the head-bopping harmony on 'The Box' or the flute backed, Gunna-assisted single, 'Start Wit Me,' Roddy excels at producing choruses that stick and only get better with repeat listens." Writing for Pitchfork, Alphonse Pierre stated that on the song, which features a "hard-hitting beat that sounds like a teapot is boiling in the background, [Ricch] finds a new delivery and pitch nearly every 10 seconds. The track is the best example of Roddy's versatility, which has been both a blessing and a curse."

Praising the song, HotNewHipHop's Mitch Findlay asserted that although its parent album "yielded plenty of highlights, none stood out quite so much as 'The Box'". Findlay called the song's "eee err" intro "creative and soon-to-be-iconic" and labeled Ricch's flow as confident and charismatic. Heran Mamo of Billboard opined that Ricch "comes armed and ready with his verses despite the rather lighthearted 'hee-hoo' ad-libs in the background". Mamo noted that in the song, Ricch raps about acquiring and protecting "his necessary riches".

== Commercial performance ==
"The Box" spent eleven weeks at the top spot of the US Billboard Hot 100, after debuting at number 47 on the issue dated December 21, 2019, and reaching number one four weeks later, becoming Ricch's first number one on the Billboard Hot 100 as well as the first new song to top the chart in the 2020s decade—since both "All I Want for Christmas Is You" by Mariah Carey and "Circles" by Post Malone began their runs at the top position in 2019. During the same week, the song logged its second week at number one on Billboard's Streaming Songs chart (drawing 68.2 million streams) and jumped to number eight on the Digital Songs chart as well, with 11,000 downloads sold. Additionally, the song reached the top spot on the Hot R&B/Hip-Hop Songs and Hot Rap Songs charts as well, becoming Ricch's first number-one song on both charts.

== Music video ==
The song's audio video was released on December 6, 2019, in conjunction with the album, accumulating 454 million views on YouTube as of February 2026.

The song's official music video premiered on YouTube on February 28, 2020, and has over 765 million views as of April 2026. It was directed by Ricch, with co-direction by Christian Breslauer, who also directed Ricch's previous two music videos, for "Boom Boom Room" and "Tip Toe". Ricch explained via Twitter the reason why the video took a "lil time" to be released was because he directed it.

=== Synopsis and concept ===
Ricch inside a glass box in a museum.

The "action-packed" video starts with Ricch speeding in a "super charged" muscle car in a "Fast & Furious-style street race". During the race, Ricch turns on his turbos and "outdrives his opponent who eventually crashes and burns, leaving Ricch the victor of the contest". The video then cuts to a basketball game, where Ricch is seen scoring the game-winning shot, "flying" in the air, akin to NBA icon Michael Jordan, with what MTV's Madeline Roth called an "impressive (and definitely far-fetched)" slam dunk. Ricch is then seen carrying out a major bank heist. Multiple scenes reference the song's lyrics, such as when Ricch delivers a speech from the White House, alluding to the line "I'm a 2020 president candidate". Halle Kiefer of Vulture noted a theme in the video: "the visual follows Ricch's unstoppable success as it takes him to surreal lengths, whether it be lounging on a bed suspended over sharks, casually walking up the side of a building or dancing in front of an explosive game of chicken". The video concludes with Ricch inside a glass box, "preserved for future generations inside a museum exhibit".

== Awards and nominations ==
Award	Year	Category	Result	Ref.
American Music Awards	2020	Favorite Song — Pop/Rock	Nominated	
American Music Awards	2020	Favorite Song — Rap/Hip-Hop	Nominated	
Apple Music Awards	2020	Song of the Year	Won	
BET Awards	2020	Video of the Year	Nominated	
BET Awards	2020	Viewer's Choice Award	Nominated	
BET Hip Hop Awards	2020	Best Hip Hop Video	Nominated	
BET Hip Hop Awards	2020	Song of the Year	Won	
Grammy Awards	2021	Song of the Year	Nominated	
Grammy Awards	2021	Best Melodic Rap Performance	Nominated	
Grammy Awards	2021	Best Rap Song	Nominated	
MTV Europe Music Awards	2020	Best Song	Nominated	
MTV Video Music Awards	2020	Song of the Year	Nominated	
MTV Video Music Awards	2020	Best Hip-Hop	Nominated	
Soul Train Music Awards	2020	Rhythm & Bars Award	Nominated	

== Credits and personnel ==
Credits adapted from Tidal.

- Roddy Ricch – vocals, songwriting
- 30 Roc – songwriting, production
- Datboisqueeze – songwriting, production
- Zentachi – songwriting, additional production
- Larrance Dopson – songwriting
- Eric Sloan – songwriting
- Khirye Anthony Tyler – songwriting
- Chris Dennis – recording
- Curtis "Sircut" Bye – engineering assistant
- Cyrus "NOIS" Taghipour – mixing
- Derek "MixedByAli" Ali – mixing
- Nicolas de Porcel – mastering

== Charts ==
=== Weekly charts ===
Chart (2019–2020)	Peak position
Argentina Hot 100 (Billboard)	54
Australia (ARIA)	4
Austria (Ö3 Austria Top 40)	10
Belgium (Ultratop 50 Flanders)	12
Belgium (Ultratop 50 Wallonia)	16
Canada Hot 100 (Billboard)	1
Czech Republic Singles Digital (ČNS IFPI)	3
Denmark (Tracklisten)	4
Estonia (Eesti Tipp-40)	2
Finland (Suomen virallinen lista)	4
France (SNEP)	7
Germany (GfK)	12
Global 200 (Billboard)	66
Greece International (IFPI)	1
Hungary (Dance Top 40)	11
Hungary (Single Top 40)	13
Hungary (Stream Top 40)	1
Iceland (Tónlistinn)	10
Ireland (IRMA)	2
Italy (FIMI)	34
Latvia Streaming (LaIPA)	1
Lithuania (AGATA)	1
Malaysia (RIM)	11
Netherlands (Single Top 100)	4
New Zealand (Recorded Music NZ)	1
Norway (VG-lista)	3
Portugal (AFP)	2
Romania (Airplay 100)	47
Scottish Singles Sales (Official Charts)	34
Singapore (RIAS)	11
Slovakia Singles Digital (ČNS IFPI)	3
Spain (Promusicae)	46
Sweden (Sverigetopplistan)	5
Switzerland (Schweizer Hitparade)	3
UK Singles (Official Charts)	2
Ukraine Airplay (TopHit) Max Beatstone Remix	27
US Billboard Hot 100	1
US Dance Airplay (Billboard)	28
US Hot R&B/Hip-Hop Songs (Billboard)	1
US Pop Airplay (Billboard)	11
US Rhythmic Airplay (Billboard)	1
US Rolling Stone Top 100	1

2026 weekly chart performance
Chart (2026)	Peak position
Nigeria Bubbling Under Hot 100 (TurnTable)	13

=== Monthly charts ===
Chart (2020)	Peak position
Brazil (Pro-Música Brasil)	40

=== Year-end charts ===
Chart (2020)	Position
Australia (ARIA)	14
Austria (Ö3 Austria Top 40)	36
Belgium (Ultratop Flanders)	38
Belgium (Ultratop Wallonia)	58
Canada (Canadian Hot 100)	4
Denmark (Tracklisten)	25
France (SNEP)	24
Germany (Official German Charts)	35
Hungary (Single Top 40)	20
Hungary (Stream Top 40)	10
Iceland (Tónlistinn)	42
Ireland (IRMA)	14
Netherlands (Single Top 100)	29
New Zealand (Recorded Music NZ)	9
Norway (VG-lista)	29
Portugal (AFP)	3
Sweden (Sverigetopplistan)	20
Switzerland (Schweizer Hitparade)	19
UK Singles (OCC)	12
US Billboard Hot 100	3
US Hot R&B/Hip-Hop Songs (Billboard)	2
US Hot Rap Songs (Billboard)	1
US Mainstream Top 40 (Billboard)	39
US Rhythmic (Billboard)	2
Worldwide (IFPI)	3

Chart (2021)	Position
Global 200 (Billboard)	162
Portugal (AFP)	147

== Certifications ==
Region	Certification	Certified units/sales
Australia (ARIA)	3× Platinum	210,000^{‡}
Austria (IFPI Austria)	Platinum	30,000^{‡}
Belgium (BRMA)	Platinum	40,000^{‡}
Brazil (Pro-Música Brasil)	Diamond	160,000^{‡}
Canada (Music Canada)	Diamond	800,000^{‡}
Denmark (IFPI Danmark)	Platinum	90,000^{‡}
France (SNEP)	Diamond	333,333^{‡}
Germany (BVMI)	Platinum	400,000^{‡}
Italy (FIMI)	Platinum	70,000^{‡}
New Zealand (RMNZ)	4× Platinum	120,000^{‡}
Poland (ZPAV)	2× Platinum	40,000^{‡}
Portugal (AFP)	4× Platinum	40,000^{‡}
Spain (Promusicae)	Platinum	60,000^{‡}
United Kingdom (BPI)	2× Platinum	1,200,000^{‡}
United States (RIAA)	Diamond	10,000,000^{‡}
^{‡} Sales+streaming figures based on certification alone.

== Release history ==
Region	Date	Format	Label	Ref.
Various	December 6, 2019	Digital download; streaming	Atlantic; Bird Vision	

== See also ==
- List of Canadian Hot 100 number-one singles of 2020
- List of number-one singles from the 2020s (New Zealand)
- List of Billboard Hot 100 number-one singles of 2020
- List of Billboard Hot 100 top-ten singles in 2020
- List of number-one Billboard Streaming Songs of 2020
