= Anniversary (Bryson Tiller album) =

Studio album by Bryson Tiller
- Released: October 2, 2020
- Recorded: 2015; 2020
- Genre: R&B
- Length: 30:50
- Label: RCA
- Producers: 40; Evan Clayton; Bijan Amir; CameOne; Chris LaRocca; Dpat; Gravez; III; J-Louis; Lee Major; Nami; Nes; Nineteen85; Rhys; Sean Momberger; StreetRunner; Syk Sense; Tarik Azzouz; Teddy Walton; Vinylz

Bryson Tiller chronology
True to Self (2017)	Anniversary (2020)	A Different Christmas (2021)

Singles from Anniversary
- 1. "Inhale" Released: September 3, 2020; 2. "Always Forever" Released: September 23, 2020; 3. "Outta Time" Released: October 20, 2020

Anniversary (stylized as A N N I V E R S A R Y) is the third studio album by American singer-songwriter Bryson Tiller. It was released by RCA Records on October 2, 2020, the fifth anniversary of Tiller's debut studio album, Trapsoul. The album includes a sole guest appearance from Drake in the standard edition and a guest appearance from Big Sean in the deluxe edition, released on February 26, 2021.

The album debuted at number five on the US Billboard 200 chart, earning 57,000 album-equivalent units in its first week.

== Background and conception ==
Tiller first teased a new album in the video for the album's lead single "Inhale", released on September 3, 2020. The visual ends with the message: "New album this fall". On September 25, a "deluxe" edition of Trapsoul was released, in preparation for Anniversary, featuring two songs that were previously released on SoundCloud during the Trapsoul era, as well as The Weeknd's remix of Trapsoul cut "Rambo" (titled "Rambo: Last Blood"). He officially announced the album and its title on September 28, posting a short trailer on Twitter. Two days before the album's release, he held a special Zoom listening session with fans, during which he played the entire project for the first time. It was also revealed that the album would include a feature from Canadian rapper Drake. During the session, Tiller said the album was created after "digging through the Trapsoul archives" during a 2020 trip to Los Angeles. He proceeded to work on ideas that he started five years before when making Trapsoul. Tiller called Anniversary the "first wave", stating that he has a lot of new music coming, hinting at his previously announced album, Serenity. That album was put on hold as he felt that his life at the time did not reflect the album's theme. Tiller described Anniversary as having a "different" energy than True to Self, an album he said he did not want to make due to legal and personal matters. Anniversary is dedicated to his late grandmother.

== Cover art ==
The album artwork was noted for resembling the Trapsoul cover; it shows Tiller facing left in front of a blue-lit space.

== Critical reception ==
Professional ratings
Review scores
Source	Rating
AllMusic	2.5/5 stars
Exclaim!	7/10
The Young Folks	7/10

Anniversary received generally positive reviews from music critics. Writing for AllMusic, Andy Kellman noted that the album "does not appear to be designed as a work of distinct identity," however, Tiller "has spoken of his inclination to be a shadowy figure." Kellman stated that the album consists of "mostly downcast verses and boastful non-sequiturs over torpid booming rhythms." Exclaim!'s Veracia Ankrah stated that "Tiller has returned to the '90s R&B sound that cultivated his dedicated fan base, with rap-esque crooning over heavy bass beats." She continued to note that his "voice is a recognizable return to his essence, sharing his honest but shallow versions of vulnerability," and that it "does not shy away from Tiller's notable flips of cassette tapes and voicemail recordings from an array of displeased women."

Ryan Feyre for The Young Folks stated that the production was a key part of the album, writing that "the drums, while adhering to a commercial bend, can sometimes feel like they’re shifting the tectonic plates in the Earth" and that "considering the album’s bulky universality, the backdrop is admirably fitting." He writes that "the second half of the album illustrates a noticeable difference in warmth and dimensionality." Feyre wrote that despite lacking innovation, Tiller "seems more inclined to appreciate the little things" and that he makes up for the weak points with his "personal storytelling." Concluding his review, he stated that "Rather than fight time’s grass, Tiller nurtures it as if it were his child. Embraces it like a new lover."

== Commercial performance ==
Anniversary debuted at number five on the US Billboard 200 chart, earning 57,000 album-equivalent units, (including 4,000 copies as pure album sales) in its first week. This became Tiller's third US top-ten on the chart. The album accumulated a total of 68.6 million in on-demand streams of the album’s songs that week. The album also debuted at number four on the US Top R&B/Hip-Hop Albums and number one on the US Top R&B Albums charts respectively.

== Track listing ==
Anniversary track listing
No.	Title	Writer(s)	Producer(s)	Length
1.	"Years Go By"	Bryson Tiller; Nicholas Warwar; Tarik Azzouz; Ruby Wood; Dominic Howard; Tommy Evans; Tarek Modi; Christopher Hargreaves; Daniel Templeman; Simon Beddoe	StreetRunner; Azzouz	2:59
2.	"Always Forever"	Tiller; Joshua Huizar; Travis Walton; Michael Cerda	J-Louis; Teddy Walton; CameOne	2:50
3.	"I'm Ready for You"	Tiller; Philip Coleman Jr.; Bijan Amirkhani; Dylan Teixeira; Devon Roberts; Jacob Wilkinson-Smith; Chris LaRocca	NES; Bijan Amir; Nami; Rhys; My Best Friend Jacob; LaRocca	2:54
4.	"Things Change"	Tiller; Kai Wright; Sean Seaton; Christopher Terrell; DeVon Lee; Devin Tracy; Romayne Erin; Terrance Griffith	III	3:34
5.	"Timeless Interlude"	Tiller; Michael McKinney; Lee Elliott; Joshua Scruggs; Sean Momberger	Lee Major; Syk Sense; Momberger	2:59
6.	"Sorrows"	Tiller; Christopher Justice; Peter Allen; David Foster; Tom Keane	Gravez	3:13
7.	"Inhale"	Tiller; David Patino; Kenneth Edmonds	Dpat	2:51
8.	"Outta Time" (featuring Drake)	Tiller; Aubrey Graham; Tyler Bryant; Josh Valle; Noah Shebib; Paul Jeffries; Anderson Hernandez; Snoh Nowrozi; Marcus James	40; Nineteen85; Vinylz	3:18
9.	"Keep Doing What You're Doing"	Tiller; Huizar; Darhyl Camper Jr.	J-Louis	2:58
10.	"Next to You"	Tiller; Walton; Hugo Gruzman; James Lyell; Julian Hamilton	Walton	3:10
Total length:				30:50

Deluxe edition
No.	Title	Writer(s)	Producer(s)	Length
11.	"Still Yours" (featuring Big Sean)	Tiller; Sean Anderson; Troy Williams; Marcello Valenzano; Andre Lyon; Rayshon Cobbs Jr.; Horace Brown; Donald DeGrate Jr.	Cool & Dre; 808-Ray	3:06
12.	"Timeless Interlude Pt. II"	Tiller; Wright; Patino; Keirston Lewis	Dpat; Sango	1:58
13.	"Losing Focus"	Tiller; Aaron Booe; Walton; Huizar	J-Louis	3:24
14.	"7:00"	Tiller; Scruggs; Johnnie Winters; Usher Raymond IV; Brian Casey; Jermaine Dupri; Manuel Seal	Syk Sense; Johnnie Winters	3:08
15.	"Like Clockwork"	Tiller; Philipp Rodrian; Jeremias Volk; Carlos Martin; Coleman; Luca Starz	Rowan; NES; Luca	2:56
Total length:				45:19

== Charts ==
=== Weekly charts ===
Chart performance for Anniversary
Chart (2020)	Peak position
Australian Albums (ARIA)	11
Belgian Albums (Ultratop Flanders)	41
Belgian Albums (Ultratop Wallonia)	86
Canadian Albums (Billboard)	6
Dutch Albums (Album Top 100)	23
French Albums (SNEP)	86
Irish Albums (Official Charts)	38
New Zealand Albums (RMNZ)	17
Norwegian Albums (VG-lista)	34
Swiss Albums (Schweizer Hitparade)	59
UK Albums (Official Charts)	12
US Billboard 200	5
US Top R&B/Hip-Hop Albums (Billboard)	4

=== Year-end charts ===
Year-end chart performance for Anniversary
Chart (2020)	Position
US Top R&B/Hip-Hop Albums (Billboard)	96

== Certifications ==
Certifications for Anniversary
Region	Certification	Certified units/sales
United Kingdom (BPI)	Gold	100,000^{‡}
United States (RIAA)	Gold	500,000^{‡}
^{‡} Sales+streaming figures based on certification alone.
