= Solace & The Vices =

2025 double album by Bryson Tiller

Studio album by Bryson Tiller
- Released: August 8, 2025 (The Vices); October 2, 2025 (full album)
- Length: 59:10
- Label: TrapSoul; RCA
- Producer: Aaron Bow; AVB; Aye YB; Benji; BMC; Boi-1da; Carter Lang; Charlie Heat; Elyas; Evergreen; Fierce; Gravez; Hitmaka; J-Louis; Kill September; Kyrou; Nes; Nick Papz; OGTha3; Patron; Poo Bear; Teddy Walton; Thurdi; Velous

Bryson Tiller chronology
Bryson Tiller (2024)	Solace & The Vices (2025)
- On some major music streaming services (such as Spotify and Tidal) but not all (for example, not on Apple Music), all twelve tracks from The Vices were released separately, one by one, from July 28, 2025, to August 8, 2025. No tracks were released as singles across all platforms.

Solace & The Vices is the fifth studio album by American singer-songwriter Bryson Tiller. The second disc, The Vices, was released first on August 8, 2025; the first disc, Solace, was released on October 2, 2025, both through RCA Records. It follows the release of his self-titled album Bryson Tiller (2024).

The Vices leans into Bryson Tiller's rap side, featuring guest appearances from BossMan Dlow, Rick Ross, Plies, T-Pain, BabyDrill, Luh Tyler, and Bun B, as well as production from Charlie Heat, Teddy Walton, Hitmaka, and Gravez, among others.

== Track listing ==
Solace track listing
No.	Title	Writer(s)	Producer(s)	Length
1.	"Strife"	Bryson Tiller; Aaron "Bow" Booe; Amman "Evergreen" Nurani; Travis "Teddy" Walton	Aaron Bow; Evergreen; Teddy Walton	2:34
2.	"No Contest"	Tiller; Christopher "Gravez" Justice; Joshua "J-Louis" Huizar	Gravez; J-Louis	2:51
3.	"Workaholic"	Tiller; Ernest "Charlie Heat" Brown; Axel Kyrou	Charlie Heat; Kyrou	2:00
4.	"I Need Her"	Tiller; Brown; Daoud Anthony	Charlie Heat	2:37
5.	"Autumn Drive"	Tiller; Bryan "BMC" Allen; Matthew "Boi-1da" Samuels; Elias "Elyas" Sticken; Amir "Fierce" Sims	BMC; Boi-1da; Elyas; Fierce	2:08
6.	"Crocodile Tears"	Tiller; Justice	Gravez	1:59
7.	"Genuine"	Tiller; Nicholas "Benji" Nguyen; Brown; Case Woodward; Christopher Williams; James Maynes; Kevin Deane	Benji; Charlie Heat	2:06
8.	"Uncertainty"	Tiller; Brown; Michaela Moore	Charlie Heat	2:23
9.	"Damn"	Tiller; Booe; Walton	Aaron Bow; Teddy Walton	1:53
10.	"Sick Interlude"	Tiller; Huizar	J-Louis	1:39
11.	"Star Signs"	Tiller; Jason "Poo Bear" Boyd	Poo Bear	3:24
12.	"Harley's Outro"	Tiller; Huizar; Walton; Carter Lang	Carter Lang; J-Louis; Teddy Walton	0:52

The Vices track listing
No.	Title	Writer(s)	Producer(s)	Length
1.	"On My Way"	Tiller; Garrett "Sean Garrett" Hamler; Tyler "Velous" Bryant; Warren "Oak" Felder; Zhang Fuquan	Velous	2:33
2.	"First Place"	Tiller; Brown; Bobby Wooten; Keith Sweat	Charlie Heat	2:09
3.	"Cut Ties" (featuring BossMan Dlow)	Tiller; Brown; Devante "BossMan Dlow" McCreary; Leon "Thurdi" McQuay	Charlie Heat; Thurdi	2:55
4.	"Mini Kelly" (featuring Rick Ross)	Tiller; Justice; William "Rick Ross" Roberts	Gravez	3:04
5.	"200 Bands" (featuring Plies and T-Pain)	Tiller; Brown; McQuay; Algernod "Plies" Washington; Faheem "T-Pain" Najm	Charlie Heat; Thurdi	2:38
6.	"Money Shower Interlude"	Tiller; Walton	Teddy Walton	1:51
7.	"More Than Money"	Tiller; Brown	Charlie Heat; Patron	3:04
8.	"Make Life Easy" (featuring BabyDrill)	Tiller; DelQuristo "BabyDrill" Wilson; Philip "Nes" Coleman; Tomi "Kill September" Mannonen	Nes; Kill September	2:57
9.	"No Sharing" (featuring Luh Tyler)	Tiller; Brown; Moore; "Luh" Tyler Meeks	Charlie Heat	3:31
10.	"Last Call"	Tiller; Ernso "AVB" Fable; Malachi "Aye YB" Haden; Christian "Hitmaka" Ward; Nikolas "Nick Papz" Papamitrou; Oliver "OGTha3" Grose; Ronald Harris	AVB; Aye YB; Hitmaka; Nick Papz; OGTha3	2:19
11.	"Burnout" (featuring Bun B)	Tiller; Coleman; Bernard "Bun B" Freeman	Nes	2:46
12.	"Finished"	Tiller; Walton	Teddy Walton	2:43
Total length:				59:10

== Personnel ==
These credits have been adapted from Tidal:

- Bryson Tiller – songwriting, performance (all tracks)
- Aaron "Bow" Booe – songwriting, production (tracks 1 and 9)
- Amman "Evergreen" Nurani – songwriting, production (track 1)
- Travis "Teddy" Walton – songwriting, production (tracks 1, 9, 12, 18, and 24)
- Christopher "Gravez" Justice – songwriting, production (tracks 2, 6, and 16)
- Joshua "J-Louis" Huizar – songwriting, production (tracks 2, 10, and 12)
- Axel Kyrou – songwriting, production, bass, drums, synthesizer (track 3)
- Ernest "Charlie Heat" Brown – songwriting, production, (tracks 3–4, 7–8, 14–15, 17, 19, and 21) synthesizer (tracks 3–4, 7–8, 14–15, 17, and 19), bass, drums (tracks 3–4 and 7–8), keyboards, programming (tracks 14–15, 17, and 19)
- Daoud Anthony – songwriting (track 4)
- Bryan "BMC" Allen – songwriting, production, programming (track 5)
- Matthew "Boi-1da" Samuels – songwriting, production, programming (track 5)
- Elias "Elyas" Sticken – songwriting, production, programming (track 5)
- Amir "Fierce" Sims – songwriting, production, programming (track 5)
- Nicholas "Benji" Nguyen – songwriting, production, bass, drums, synthesizer (track 7)
- Case Woodward – songwriting (track 7)
- Christopher Williams – songwriting (track 7)
- James Maynes – songwriting (track 7)
- Kevin Deane – songwriting (track 7)
- Michaela Moore – songwriting (tracks 8 and 21)
- Jason "Poo Bear" Boyd – songwriting, production (track 11)
- Johan Lennox – strings (track 11)
- Carter Lang – songwriting, production (track 12)
- Tyler "Velous" Bryant – songwriting, production (track 13)
- Garrett "Sean Garrett" Hamler – songwriting, production (track 13)
- Warren "Oak" Felder – songwriting, production (track 13)
- Zhang Fuquan – songwriting, production (track 13)
- Bobby Wooten – songwriting (track 14)
- Keith Sweat – songwriting (track 14)
- Devante "BossMan Dlow" McCreary – songwriting, performance (track 15)
- Leon "Thurdi" McQuay – songwriting, production (tracks 15 and 17)
- William "Rick Ross" Roberts – songwriting, performance (track 16)
- Algernod "Plies" Washington – songwriting, performance (track 17)
- Faheem "T-Pain" Najm – songwriting, performance (track 17)
- "Patron" – songwriting, production (track 19)
- DelQuristo "BabyDrill" Wilson – songwriting, performance (track 20)
- Philip "Nes" Coleman – songwriting, production (tracks 20 and 23)
- Tomi "Kill September" Mannonen – songwriting, production (track 20)
- "Luh" Tyler Meeks – songwriting, performance (track 21)
- Ernso "AVB" Fable – songwriting, production (track 22)
- Malachi "Aye YB" Haden – songwriting, production (track 22)
- Christian "Hitmaka" Ward – songwriting, production (track 22)
- Nikolas "Nick Papz" Papamitrou – songwriting, production (track 22)
- Oliver "OGTha3" Grose – songwriting, production (track 22)
- Ronald Harris – songwriting (track 22)
- Bernard "Bun B" Freeman – songwriting, performance (track 23)
- Mike Seaberg – mixing, mastering (all tracks)
- Chris Bhikoo – assistant engineering (tracks 1–22)

== Charts ==
Chart performance for Solace & The Vices
Chart (2025)	Peak position
US Billboard 200	52
