= 2019 Soul Train Music Awards =

Music awards ceremony in Las Vegas, US

Soul Train Music Awards
- Date: November 17, 2019
- Location: Orleans Arena, Las Vegas, Nevada
- Country: United States
- Hosted by: Tisha Campbell & Tichina Arnold
- Most awards: Chris Brown (3); Drake (3)
- Most nominations: Chris Brown (8)
- Website: www.bet.com/shows/soul-train-awards/

Television/radio coverage
- Network: BET; BET Her; VH1

The 2019 Soul Train Music Awards took place on November 17 at the Orleans Arena in Las Vegas, Nevada, and aired live for the first time on BET and BET Her. It was hosted by Tisha Campbell & Tichina Arnold, for the first time in the awards ceremony history from Orleans Arena in Las Vegas, Nevada.

The nominations were announced on October 25, 2019. Chris Brown received the most nominations with eight, followed by Drake with seven. The most nominated female artist were Beyoncé and Lizzo, both with six nominations.

During the ceremony Jimmy Jam and Terry Lewis were honored with the Legend Award, while gospel singer Yolanda Adams received the Lady of Soul Award for her contributions to the music industry.

== Special awards ==
Honorees are as listed below:

=== Legend Award ===
Jimmy Jam & Terry Lewis

=== Lady Of Soul Award ===
Yolanda Adams

== Nominees ==
Nominees are as listed below. Winners are in bold:

=== Best New Artist ===
- **Summer Walker**
  - Lucky Daye
  - Mahalia
  - Nicole Bus
  - Pink Sweat$
  - YK Osiris

=== Soul Train Certified Award ===
- **Trevor Jackson**
  - Ciara
  - Daniel Caesar
  - Fantasia
  - India Arie
  - Kelly Rowland

=== Best R&B/Soul Female Artist ===
- **H.E.R.**
  - Ari Lennox
  - Beyoncé
  - Lizzo
  - Mary J. Blige
  - Summer Walker

=== Best R&B/Soul Male Artist ===
- **Khalid**
  - Anderson .Paak
  - Bruno Mars
  - Chris Brown
  - Daniel Caesar
  - Tank

=== Best Gospel/Inspirational Award ===
- **Kirk Franklin**
  - BeBe Winans
  - Donald Lawrence
  - Erica Campbell
  - Tasha Cobbs Leonard
  - Tori Kelly

=== Rhythm & Bars Award (Best Hip-Hop Song Of The Year) ===
- **Cardi B – "Money"**
  - 21 Savage – "A Lot" (featuring J. Cole)
  - DaBaby – "Suge"
  - J. Cole – "Middle Child"
  - Meek Mill – "Going Bad" (featuring Drake)
  - Megan Thee Stallion – "Cash Shit" (featuring DaBaby)

=== Song Of The Year ===
- **Chris Brown – "No Guidance" (featuring Drake)**
  - Beyoncé – "Before I Let Go"
  - Ella Mai – "Shot Clock"
  - Khalid – "Talk"
  - Lizzo – "Juice"
  - Summer Walker – "Girls Need Love" (Remix) (featuring Drake)

=== Album/Mixtape Of The Year ===
- **Lizzo – Cuz I Love You**
- Ari Lennox – Shea Butter Baby
- Chris Brown – Indigo
- Ella Mai – Ella Mai
- H.E.R. – I Used to Know Her
- Khalid – Free Spirit

=== The Ashford And Simpson Songwriter's Award ===
- **Beyoncé, Saint Jhn, & Wizkid – "Brown Skin Girl" (featuring Blue Ivy Carter)**
  - **Written by Beyoncé, Carlos St. John, Adio Marchant, Shawn Carter, Stacy Barthe, Anathi Mnyango, Michael Uzowuru, Wizkid & Richard Isong**
- H.E.R. – "Hard Place"
  - Written by H.E.R., David Harris, Sam Ashworth, James Fauntleroy & Ruby Amanfu
- Lizzo – "Juice"
  - Written by Melissa Jefferson, Theron Thomas, Eric Frederic, Sam Sumser and Sean Small
- Anderson .Paak – "Make It Better" (featuring Smokey Robinson)
  - Written by Brandon Anderson, William Robinson, Alana Chenervert, Miguel Atwood-Ferguson, Daniel Maman & Farid Nassar
- Chris Brown – "No Guidance" (featuring Drake)
  - Written by Christopher Brown, Aubrey Graham, Anderson Hernandez, Joshua Louis Huizar, Teddy Walton, Noah Shebib, Nija Charles, Tyler Bryant & Michee Lebrun
- Khalid – "Talk"
  - Written by Khalid Robinson, Guy Lawrence, & Howard Lawrence

=== Best Dance Performance ===
- **Chris Brown – "No Guidance" (featuring Drake)**
  - Beyoncé – "Spirit"
  - Lizzo – "Juice"
  - Normani – "Motivation"
  - Teyana Taylor – "WTP"
  - DaniLeigh – "Easy" (Remix) (featuring Chris Brown)

=== Best Collaboration Performance ===
- **Chris Brown – "No Guidance" (featuring Drake)**
  - Ari Lennox & J. Cole – "Shea Butter Baby"
  - Beyoncé, Saint Jhn & Wizkid – "Brown Skin Girl" (featuring Blue Ivy Carter)
  - Cardi B & Bruno Mars – "Please Me"
  - PJ Morton – "Say So" (featuring JoJo)
  - Ty Dolla $ign – "Purple Emoji" (featuring J. Cole)

=== Video Of The Year ===
- **Lizzo – "Juice"**
  - Alicia Keys – "Raise a Man"
  - Beyoncé – "Spirit"
  - Childish Gambino – "Feels Like Summer"
  - Chris Brown – "No Guidance" (featuring Drake)
  - Khalid – "Better"

== Multiple nominations and awards ==
The following received multiple nominations:

Nominations	Recipients
8	Chris Brown
7	Drake
6	Beyoncé
6	Lizzo
5	Daniel Caesar
5	Khalid
4	J. Cole
3	Ari Lennox
3	H.E.R.
3	Summer Walker
2	Anderson .Paak
2	Blue Ivy Carter
2	Bruno Mars
2	Cardi B
2	DaBaby
2	Ella Mai
2	Saint Jhn
2	Wizkid

The following received multiple awards:

Awards	Recipients
3	Chris Brown
3	Drake
2	Lizzo
