= Always Forever =

2020 single by Bryson Tiller

Single by Bryson Tiller

from the album Anniversary
- Released: September 21, 2020
- Genre: Trap
- Length: 2:50
- Label: RCA
- Songwriters: Tiller; Joshua Huizar; Travis Walton; Michael Cerda
- Producers: J-Louis; Teddy Walton; CameOne

Bryson Tiller singles chronology
"Inhale" (2020)	"Always Forever" (2020)	"Outta Time" (2020)

Visualizer
- "Always Forever" on YouTube

"Always Forever" is a song by American singer Bryson Tiller, released on September 21, 2020, as the second single from his third studio album, Anniversary. The song sees Tiller lamenting about a lost love whose feelings are not reciprocated.

== Composition and lyrics ==
Over "smoothed-out" production and his signature trap-infused drums, Tiller details a one-sided love, coming to terms with "forever" not being for always, because he and his lovers' emotions are worlds apart, due to trust issues and dishonesty. Although he seems ready to move on, he finds it difficult to do so as easily as his partner did.

== Critical reception ==
Aaron Williams of Uproxx said the slow song allows Tiller to show off his vocals more than his bars. Ayana Rashed of Respect said Tiller's "mesmerizing vocals" are on full display, "reminding fans of his signature style that they've come to know and love".

== Cover artwork ==
The song's cover art is a vintage-type photo of Tiller in all-white. HotNewHipHop's Alex Zidel noted the cover is "fairly simple, embracing the modesty of his music and sound".

== Charts ==
Chart performance for "Always Forever"
Chart (2020)	Peak position
Canada Hot 100 (Billboard)	91
UK Singles (Official Charts)	66
US Billboard Hot 100	83
US Hot R&B/Hip-Hop Songs (Billboard)	33

== Certifications ==
Certifications for "Always Forever"
Region	Certification	Certified units/sales
Canada (Music Canada)	Gold	40,000^{‡}
^{‡} Sales+streaming figures based on certification alone.
