= Better Me Than You =

Studio album by Big Sean
- Released: August 30, 2024
- Genres: Hip-hop; funk
- Length: 66:00
- Labels: FF to Def; Def Jam
- Producers: Aaron Bow; Aaron Reid; the Alchemist; Amaire Johnson; AzizTheShake; BbyKobe; Beam; Berg; Big Sean; Bnyx; Bouvé; Brian "AllDay" Miller; Carter Lang; Cash Cobain; Corbett; DJ Khalil; Eryn Allen Kane; FnZ; Harv; Hit-Boy; Jasper Harris; Johan Lenox; Johnathan Hulett; Kaytranada; Key Wane; Lasik; Leon Thomas III; Lido; Lil Rich; Malay; Mano; Marshall Mulherin; Mathaius Young; Milan Beker; Money Jezus; Myles T; Nami; OG Webbie; Omar Grand; Otxhello; Parker Mulherin; Peter Lee Johnson; Presley Regier; Rogét Chahayed; SkipOnDaBeat; Teddy Walton; The-Dream; Thundercat; Tom Kahre; Tom Levesque; Turbo; WondaGurl; Zacari; 206Derek

Big Sean chronology
What You Expect (2021)	Better Me Than You (2024)	SeanChemist (TBA)

Singles from Better Me Than You
- 1. "Precision" Released: March 22, 2024; 2. "Yes" Released: July 19, 2024; 3. "On Up" Released: August 2, 2024

Better Me Than You is the sixth studio album by American rapper Big Sean, released through FF to Def Entertainment on August 30, 2024, with distribution handled by Def Jam Recordings. It features guest appearances from Bryson Tiller, Cash Cobain, Charlie Wilson, Dwayne "The Rock" Johnson, Gunna, Ellie Goulding, Eryn Allen Kane, Kodak Black, Larry June, Syd, Teyana Taylor, and Thundercat, among others. His first studio album since parting ways with GOOD Music and longtime label boss Kanye West, the project was originally announced on July 19, 2024 (which was the same day an unfinished alternate version of the album was leaked), before being pushed back by several weeks.

== Background ==
On September 4, 2020, Big Sean released his fourth album Detroit 2. The album debuted at number one on the Billboard 200, marking his third number-one album. The album was followed a year later, on October 29, 2021, by a collaborative extended play (EP) with record producer Hit-Boy titled What You Expect, peaking at number 76 on the Billboard 200. That same day, Sean announced on Twitter that after 14 years, he would step away from Kanye West's GOOD Music label, stating the relationship was "a forever brotherhood, but business wise, I had to start getting a bigger cut! I worked my way out that deal." West also claimed during a November 2021 Drink Champs podcast that signing Sean was the 'worst decision' of his entire career.

On March 22, 2024, Sean released the single "Precision", which would eventually serve as the lead single for his sixth album. In July 2024, Sean performed a freestyle on the radio show On the Radar, wherein he indirectly affronted his former label boss Kanye West. As a result, an alternative and unfinished version of Sean's album was leaked by a user on X. Seemingly undeterred, he wrote on the platform himself later that month on July 18:

“The pressure of life (being a new Dad, being [an] artist that’s growing, being a human in development, etc) and embracing it all led me to a lot of clarity on what I needed to focus on to find a piece of happiness [...] The past few years making this album have been a journey to say the least, but l’m just glad we finally here.”

In the same post, he announced his sixth album to be released on August 9, with the album's second single, "Yes", being released the following day on July 19. A few days after the release of the third single "On Up", Sean confirmed via an Instagram comment that the album was delayed due to scheduling issues. A promotional single with producer The Alchemist, entitled "Together Forever" was released on August 16, a week after the album's initial release date.

On August 26, 2024, Sean announced the album's new release date of August 30. On the same day, he admitted in an emotional Instagram Live with his fans that he was apprehensive about releasing the project due to overthinking, experiencing the album creation process completely sober, and other creative insecurities. He was inspired by "the pressures of life of becoming a new dad", being an artist continuing to grow and transform, and embracing "being a human in [constant] development."

Other than through-lines of personal growth and weariness of fame, additional subjects discussed include building empires as a Black man in a tumultuous, 21st century America, mistakes of past family generations, his aspirations for his own son, and the positive relationship he hopes they can share as he grows up.

== Critical reception ==
Professional ratings
Review scores
Source	Rating
Clash	7/10
HipHopDX	3/5

In a positive review from online publication HotNewHipHop, the album is celebrated by reviewer Elias Andrews for finding a "contemplative groove" that "fans are going to love." Andrews later mentions when highlighting Big Sean's newfound maturity that "[there are] still scores to settle, and rappers to rag on, but there's an awareness that it's not all that important at the end of the day."

Reviewing the album for Clash, Robin Murray stated, "Better Me Than You is deft and personal, boasting a caramel-smooth sense of West Coast funk. [In portions the project] can seem inconsistent, but taken as a whole it's a testament to Big Sean’s vitality, his artistic self-awareness, and his commitment to creative growth.".

In a more mixed review from Sam Moore of HipHopDX, the album was lauded as a "mature effort from a [formerly] horny punchline merchant", celebrating the use of unusual samples and the soulful stylings of former labelmate Teyana Taylor and Charlie Wilson to help him "deal with weighty themes of fatherhood and generational pain." However, the review also noted he "slip[ped] back into his old self on the Usher-sampling “Who You Are (Superstar)” as he reverts back to the cringe-worthy sex raps", and the album (while "cohesive") was deemed to not have "enough depth, intrigue or tension to justify a runtime of over an hour."

In a lukewarm review from Stereogum titled "Big Sean Is No Fun Now", the project was admired for being "cohesive and effectively sequenced,... creating a pensive, brooding ambiance that mirrors Sean’s mood [with] aural synths meet[ing] naked ruminations that linger like troubling thoughts", before admonishment for "shallow prose" and "singular subject matter."

== Commercial performance ==
The album was projected to earn 23,000 album-equivalent units in its first week, the lowest of Big Sean's career, landing at number 25 on the US Billboard 200. The only song from the album to chart was "It Is What It Is" featuring Gunna, peaking at #38 on the Billboard R&B/Hip-Hop chart.

== Track listing ==
Better Me Than You track listing
No.	Title	Writer(s)	Producer(s)	Length
1.	"Pressure" (intro)	Sean Anderson; Milan Beker; Stephen Bruner; David "Vitto" Gordon; Ashley Merchant	Big Sean; Beker; Thundercat	0:54
2.	"Iconic"	S. Anderson; Bailey Goldberg; Benjamin Saint Fort; Chauncey Hollis; Eryn Allen Kane; Jasper Harris; Johnathan Hulett; Beker; Dylan Teixeira; Othello Houston; Presley Regier; Rogét Chahayed; Tom Levesque; Tyshane Thompson	Hit-Boy; Chahayed; Beam; Hulett; Jasper Harris; Regier; Nami; Levesque; Berg; Otxhello; Bnyx; Beker; Kane	2:36
3.	"Typecast"	S. Anderson; Teixeira; Koehn; Jahmarie Adams; Harris; Regier; Levesque	Big Sean; Harris; Regier; Bnyx; Nami; Levesque; Kane	3:19
4.	"Break the Cycle" (with Charlie Wilson)	S. Anderson; Charles Wilson; Leon Thomas III; Beker; Peter Lee Johnson	Big Sean; Thomas; P. Johnson; Beker	4:41
5.	"Who You Are (Superstar)"	S. Anderson; Abdul Aziz Dieng; Andre Harris; Carl Thompson; Christopher Wallace; Enoch Harris III; Harrison Bouvé; Jahmarie Adams; Jason "Poo Bear" Boyd; Myles Satterfield; Norman Glover; Nyticka Hemingway; Reginald Ellis; Ryan Toby; Sean Combs; Stephen Feigenbaum; Terius Gesteelde-Diamant; Tom Kahre; Usher Raymond IV	Big Sean; Lil Rich; Johan Lenox; AzizTheShake; Bouvé; Myles T; Kahre; The-Dream	3:21
6.	"Yes"	S. Anderson; Aaron Booe; Emmanuel Nickerson; E. Harris III; Eric Bellinger; Isaac De Boni; Jazz Cartier; Julian Harris; Markus Randle; Michael Mule; Beker; Satterfield; Chahayed; Gesteelde-Diamant; Travis Walton; Welbon Morris Jr.	Big Sean; FnZ; Mano; Lil Rich; OG Webbie; Beker; Myles T; Teddy Walton; Aaron Bow; Chahayed; The-Dream	3:29
7.	"It Is What It Is" (with Gunna)	S. Anderson; Chandler A. Great; Omar Perrin; Sergio Kitchens	Turbo; Omar Grand	3:23
8.	"Apologize" (with Eryn Allen Kane)	S. Anderson; Bernard Harvey; Koehn; Marshall Mulherin; Parker Mulherin; Peder Losnegård; Feigenbaum; Tay James	Big Sean; Harv; Johan Lenox; M. Mulherin; P. Mulherin; Lido; Kane	4:04
9.	"Clarity" (skit)	S. Anderson; Theo Coakley	Brian "AllDay" Miller	1:31
10.	"On Up"	S. Anderson; Amaire Johnson; Cedric Hailey; Dalvin DeGrate; Dwayne Weir II; Koehn; Ivan Lins; Joel Hailey; Vítor Martins	Big Sean; Key Wane; Kane; A. Johnson	2:28
11.	"Something" (with Syd)	S. Anderson; Reid; Harvey; Beker; Zacari Pacaldo	Harv; Reid; Beker	2:31
12.	"Black Void" (with Thundercat and Eryn Allen Kane)	S. Anderson; Carter Lang; Koehn; James Ryan Ho; Julian Harris; Chahayed; Bruner	Big Sean; Thundercat; Chahayed; Lang; Malay; Kane	4:12
13.	"This n That" (with Bryson Tiller and Kodak Black)	S. Anderson; Bill Kapri; Bryson Tiller; Hollis; Dustin Corbett	Hit-Boy; Corbett	4:09
14.	"Million Pieces" (with Teyana Taylor, Larry June and DJ Premier)	S. Anderson; Albert Johnson; Davis; Hollis; Christopher Martin; Eric Jackson; J. Hailey; Julian Harris; C. Hailey; Keith Elam; Kejuan Muchita; Larry Hendricks III; Latisha Hyman; Beker	Hit-Boy; Big Sean; Beker	3:02
15.	"Get You Back" (with Cash Cobain)	S. Anderson; Cashmere Small; Christian Scye Taylor; Ebony Oshunrinde; Rheji Burrell	Cash Cobain; WondaGurl; Mathaius Young; BbyKobe	4:01
16.	"Certified" (with Nasaan)	S. Anderson; Derek Anderson; Desmond Rasberry; Edgar Ferrara; Matthew Laskey	206Derek; SkipOnDaBeat; Money Jezus; Lasik	3:21
17.	"Focus" (skit)	S. Anderson	Beker	1:29
18.	"Boundaries"	S. Anderson; A. Johnson; Cleo Nikolic; Dean Josiah Cover; Weir II; Joseph Lloyd-Watson; Beker	Big Sean; Key Wane; Beker; A. Johnson	3:00
19.	"Precision"	S. Anderson; Bellinger; De Boni; Jordan Ortiz; Mule; Walton; Booe; Darnell Carlton; Donald Pears; Jordan Houston; Markus Randle; Paul Beauregard; Willie Hutchinson; Pacaldo	FnZ; Teddy Walton; Aaron Bow; Tom Kahre; Zacari	2:44
20.	"My Life" (featuring Ellie Goulding) / "Happiness" (skit)	S. Anderson; Ellie Goulding; Koehn; Louis Celestin; Robert "Bubby" Lewis; Chahayed; Feigenbaum	Chahayed; Kaytranada; Johan Lenox; Kane	4:44
21.	"Together Forever" (bonus track; with the Alchemist)	S. Anderson; Alan Maman; Daniel Seeff; Khalil Abdul Rahman; Lorenzo Johnson; Nikki Grier; Oliver W. Wells	The Alchemist; DJ Khalil	3:01
Total length:				66:00

Better Me Than You – CD and vinyl track listing
No.	Title	Length
1.	"Apologize" (with Eryn Allen Kane)	4:04
2.	"Precision"	2:44
3.	"Who You Are (Superstar)"	3:21
4.	"Yes"	3:29
5.	"Break the Cycle" (with Charlie Wilson)	4:41
6.	"On Up"	2:28
7.	"Boundaries"	3:00
8.	"Black Void" (with Thundercat and Eryn Allen Kane)	4:12
9.	"Million Pieces" (with Teyana Taylor, Larry June and DJ Premier)	3:02
10.	"Typecast"	3:19

Better Me Than You – Happiness edition vinyl bonus track
No.	Title	Length
11.	"Together Forever" (with the Alchemist)	3:01

Better Me Than You – Clarity edition vinyl bonus track
No.	Title	Length
11.	"Something" (with Syd)	2:31

Better Me Than You – Focus edition vinyl bonus track
No.	Title	Length
11.	"Get You Back" (with Cash Cobain)	4:01

Better Me Than You – Pressure edition vinyl bonus track
No.	Title	Length
11.	"Wire Me"	2:14

=== Samples and interpolations ===
- "Who You Are (Superstar)"
  - contains a sample of "Superstar", written by Usher Raymond IV, Andre Harris, Vidal Davis, Jason "Poo Bear" Boyd, Ryan Toby, and Nyticka Hemingway, and performed by Usher.
- "On Up"
  - contains a sample of "Get On Up", written by Dalvin DeGrate, Cedric Hailey, Joel Hailey, Ivan Lins, Vítor Martins, and performed by Jodeci.
- "Million Pieces"
  - contains a sample of "Royalty", written by Christopher Martin, Keith Elam, Cedric Hailey, and Joel Hailey, and performed by Gang Starr & K-Ci & JoJo.
- "Boundaries"
  - contains a sample of "Know That You Are Loved", written by Cleo Nikolic, Dean Josiah Cover, and Joseph Lloyd-Watson, and performed by Cleo Sol.
- "Typecast"
  - contains a sample of "Think Big Bitch", written by E. Broussard, & Frisco Reese and performed by E. Broussard & Frisco Reese.

== Personnel ==
Credits adapted from Apple Music.

- Big Sean – lead vocals, background vocals (All tracks)
- Milan Beker – keyboards, synthesizer, programming, background vocals, piano, recording engineer, engineer (All tracks)
- Nicholas De Porcel – mastering engineer (all tracks)
- Berg – bass, keyboards, percussion, drums (2)
- Otxhello – keyboards, bass, percussion, drums (2)
- Stephen Bruner – bass (1, 12)
- Beam – keyboards, bass, percussion, drums (2)
- Turbo – percussion, drums (7)
- Omar Grand – keyboards, bass, trumpet (7)
- Rogét Chahayed – keyboards, programming (2, 6, 12, 20)
- Isaac De Boni – keyboards, programming (6)
- Michael Mule – keyboards, programming (6)
- Harv – keyboards, bass, drums (8)
- Lido – keyboards, programming, drums (8)
- Carter Lang – keyboards, programming, drums, percussion (12)
- Malay – programming, drums (12)
- WondaGurl – programming, bass, drums (15)
- Mathaius Young – programming, bass, drums (15)
- SkipOnDaBeat – bass, drums (16)
- Tom Kahre – programming (19)
- Kaytranada – programming (20)
- Presley Regier – drums (3)
- Tom Levesque – keyboards, synthesizer (3)
- Jasper Harris – keyboards (3)
- Bnyx – programming (3)
- Kevin J. Enstrom – guitar (5)
- Parker Mulherin – guitar (8)
- Yasmeen Al-Mazeedi – violin (8, 20)
- The Alchemist – drums (21)
- DJ Khalil – percussion (21)
- Daniel Seeff – bass (21)
- Lorenzo Johnson – keyboards (21)
- Peter Lee Johnson – keyboards, programming (4)
- Eryn Allen Kane – vocal producer (4, 6)
- Johan Lenox – string arranger, programming, synthesizer (5, 8, 20)
- Brian "AllDay" Miller – programming (9)
- David "Vitto" Gordon – background vocals (1)
- Ashley Merchant – background vocals (1–2)
- Nami – background vocals (3)
- Eryn Allen Koehn – background vocals (3–4, 6, 8, 14, 20)
- Dwayne "the Rock" Johnson – background vocals (4)
- Johan Lenox – background vocals (5, 8)
- The-Dream – background vocals (5–6, 19)
- KayCyy – background vocals (5)
- Tia Pickrom – background vocals (5, 16)
- Willie – background vocals (6, 8, 10, 20)
- Jazmine Bailey – background vocals (6, 8, 10, 20)
- George Lovett – background vocals (6, 8, 10, 20)
- Marshall Mulherin – background vocals (8)
- Parker Mulherin – background vocals (8)
- Lido – background vocals (8)
- Syd – background vocals (11)
- Zacari Pacaldo – background vocals (11)
- Stephen Bruner – background vocals (12)
- Tish Hyman – background vocals (14)
- Jennae Calhoun – background vocals (16)
- Chris Powell – background vocals (17)
- Nasaan Holton – background vocals (20)
- Nikki Grier – background vocals (21)
- Frisco Reese – speaker (3)
- Cyrus "NOIS" Taghipour – mixing engineer (1–20)
- Derek "MixedByAli" Ali – mixing engineer (1–20)
- Brandon Blatz – assistant mixing engineer (1–5, 7–9, 11–20)
- Curtis "Sircut" Bye – assistant mixing engineer (1–5, 8–9, 11–20)
- Demetrius Lewis II – assistant mastering engineer (1–9, 11–21)
- Julian Vasquez – recording engineer (2, 6, 12, 20)
- Tom Kahre – recording engineer, mixing engineer (3, 5, 8, 11–12, 19–20)
- Flo Ongonga – recording engineer (7)
- Bert Gervis – recording engineer (11)
- Nef – recording engineer (14)
- Todd Cooper – recording engineer (14)
- Baruch Nembhard – recording engineer, mixing engineer (14)
- Kevin Brunhober – assistant recording engineer (3, 8)
- Phillippe Weiss – mixing engineer (21)
- Martin Berger – assistant mixing engineer (21)
- Zachary Lamb – assistant recording engineer (4, 18)
- Hayden Duncan – assistant recording engineer (5–6, 11, 19)
- Omar Loya – engineer (19)

== Charts ==
Chart performance for Better Me Than You
Chart (2024)	Peak position
US Billboard 200	25
US Top R&B/Hip-Hop Albums (Billboard)	4
