= Aston Martin Truck =

2022 single by Roddy Ricch

Single by Roddy Ricch

from the album Feed Tha Streets III
- Released: October 21, 2022
- Length: 3:00
- Label: Atlantic
- Songwriters: Rodrick Moore, Jr.; Travis Walton; Aaron Booe; Leutrim Beqiri
- Producers: Teddy Walton; Aaron Bow; Byrd

Roddy Ricch singles chronology
"B.R.O. (Better Ride Out)" (2022)	"Aston Martin Truck" (2022)	"Twin" (2022)

Music video
- "Aston Martin Truck" on YouTube

"Aston Martin Truck" is a song by American rapper Roddy Ricch, released on October 21, 2022, as the second single from his third mixtape Feed Tha Streets III (2022). It was produced by Teddy Walton, Aaron Bow and Byrd.

== Composition ==
Over a "glimmering" beat, Roddy Ricch raps about his wealth and resulting lifestyle in the song, expressing gratitude for it, and also mentioning his love for lean and taking aim at his haters, presumably rapper Lil Uzi Vert in particular.

== Music video ==
The music video was directed by 20K and released alongside the single. In it, Roddy Ricch boards a private jet, spends time in the streets of Queens, hangs out with a dirtbike crew, and shops for jewelry. Throughout the video, he also shows off his diamond jewelry.

== Charts ==
Chart performance for "Aston Martin Truck"
Chart (2022)	Peak position
New Zealand Hot Singles (RMNZ)	16
US Bubbling Under Hot 100 (Billboard)	1
US Hot R&B/Hip-Hop Songs (Billboard)	36
