= Twin (song) =

2022 single by Roddy Ricch

Single by Roddy Ricch featuring Lil Durk

from the album Feed Tha Streets III
- Released: November 14, 2022
- Length: 2:28
- Label: Atlantic
- Songwriters: Rodrick Moore, Jr.; Durk Banks; Travis Walton; Aaron Booe; Leutrim Beqiri
- Producers: Teddy Walton; Aaron Bow; Byrd

Roddy Ricch singles chronology
"Aston Martin Truck" (2022)	"Twin" (2022)	"Pissy" (2023)

Lil Durk singles chronology
"My Friends" (2022)	"Twin" (2022)	"Hanging with Wolves" (2022)

Music video
- "Twin" on YouTube

"Twin" is a song by American rapper Roddy Ricch, released on November 14, 2022, as the third single from his third mixtape Feed Tha Streets III (2022). It features American rapper Lil Durk and was produced by Teddy Walton, Aaron Bow and Byrd.

== Content ==
Lyrically, the song finds Roddy Ricch referencing his travels, including "shutting down the currency exchange" in London, and encourages Kim Kardashian to rekindle her relationship with Kanye West. In his verse, Lil Durk raps aggressively and demands for rapper Pooh Shiesty's release from prison.

== Music video ==
The music video premiered on November 21, 2022. Directed by Jerry Production, it sees Roddy Ricch and Lil Durk riding side by side in matching cars through the streets at night, hanging out the passenger seat windows, and shopping as retail therapy in a designer streetwear store. The rappers also dance and flaunt their luxuries.

== Charts ==
Chart performance for "Twin"
Chart (2022)	Peak position
US Bubbling Under Hot 100 (Billboard)	1
US Hot R&B/Hip-Hop Songs (Billboard)	35
