= Feed Tha Streets III =

Feed tha Streets III

Mixtape by Roddy Ricch
- Released: November 18, 2022
- Length: 38:39
- Label: Atlantic; Bird Vision
- Producer: 254bodi; 7ink; Adriano; AlekBeatz; Ambezza; B. March; B3; Beezo; Blom; Aaron Bow; Brody; Martin Brown; Byrd; Cubeatz; DY; Jetson; Juvy Catcher; Mfoss; Kevin Mitchell; Mustard; ProdbyJeff; Shottie; Slizer; Sonic; Square; Will Steller; Turbo; UV Killin Em; Luca Vialli; Teddy Walton; Louis Yung; Zookids

Roddy Ricch chronology
The Big 3 (2022)	Feed tha Streets III (2022)	The Navy Album (TBA)

Singles from Feed Tha Streets III
- 1. "Stop Breathing" Released: September 30, 2022; 2. "Aston Martin Truck" Released: October 21, 2022; 3. "Twin" Released: November 14, 2022

Feed tha Streets III is the third commercial mixtape by American rapper Roddy Ricch. It was released through Atlantic Records and Bird Vision Entertainment on November 18, 2022. The mixtape features guest appearances from Lil Durk and Ty Dolla Sign. Production was handled by Cubeatz, DY, Teddy Walton, Turbo, Jetson, and Mustard, among others. The mixtape was supported by three singles: "Stop Breathing", "Aston Martin Truck", and the Durk-assisted "Twin". It is the final installment of Ricch's Feed Tha Streets mixtape trilogy.

== Background ==
On August 5, 2022, Ricch wrote a handwritten letter to his fans and posted a picture of it, providing an update on the mixtape and on his life:

Been working hard on this Feed Tha Streets 3 album, getting back to my regular regimen and also been happier than I've been in a long time.

I understand things have escalated quickly and God has taken us to places we never would've imagined possible but I'm here for every challenge and obstacle. Thank You to everybody whose stayed supportive of me through all the glorious moments and all the hard times.

During my process I've been able to work close with some amazing people on a new tech company called, ROLL.

I want to be closer to my fans and show all the sides no one ever sees. I want to show my album process, my new journey of fatherhood and all the things that comes with the life of being RR.

== Release and promotion ==
On October 22, 2022, Ricch's 24th birthday, he announced the mixtape and its release date, alongside its cover art, after revealing its existence a few times before. On November 13, 2022, he shared its tracklist, which also revealed the list of record producers and what tracks they produced.

=== Singles ===
The lead single of the mixtape, "Stop Breathing", was released on September 30, 2022. The second single, "Aston Martin Truck", was released on October 21, 2022. The third single, "Twin", which features fellow American rapper Lil Durk, was released on November 14, 2022.

== Critical reception ==
Professional ratings
Review scores
Source	Rating
AllMusic	2.5/5 stars
Pitchfork	5.3/10

Joshua Robinson of HotNewHipHop felt that it feels good for a mixtape although Ricch is less aggressive than usual, explaining that he "proves that and emphatically puts a pin in the intriguing first chapter of his career".

== Track listing ==
Feed Tha Streets III track listing
No.	Title	Writer(s)	Producer(s)	Length
1.	"Just Because"	Rodrick Moore, Jr.; Mathias Liyew; Louis Yung; Orcutt & Buser	Ambezza; Yung	2:33
2.	"King Size"	Moore; Eric Sandoval; Tim Gomringer; Kevin Gomringer	Sonic; Cubeatz; 7ink; B3; Square	3:09
3.	"Heavier"	Moore; Bishop Grinnage; Kevin Mitchell; Martin Brown	Beezo; Mitchell; Brown	2:49
4.	"Blue Cheese"	Moore; Sandoval; AlekBeatz	Sonic; AlekBeatz	2:05
5.	"Favor for a Favor"	Moore; Dwan Avery; Cameron March	DY; B. March	3:00
6.	"Twin" (featuring Lil Durk)	Moore; Durk Banks; Travis Walton; Aaron Booe; Leutrim Beqiri	Teddy Walton; Aaron Bow; Byrd	2:28
7.	"Aston Martin Truck"	Moore; Walton; Booe; Beqiri	Teddy Walton; Aaron Bow; Byrd	3:00
8.	"Get Swept"	Moore; Sandoval; Mikado Andersen	Sonic; Mfoss; Blom	2:36
9.	"Belly of the Beast"	Moore; Grinnage; Slizer	Beezo; Slizer	2:53
10.	"Stop Breathing"	Moore; Chandler Durham; Tahj Morgan; Darryl Clemons; Ashot Akopian	Turbo; Jetson; Pooh Beatz; Shottie	1:50
11.	"Fade Away"	Moore; Sandoval; Cameron Griff	Sonic; Cam Griff	2:31
12.	"#1 Freak" (featuring Ty Dolla Sign)	Moore; Tyrone Griffin, Jr.; Sandoval; Patrick Bodi	Turbo; 254bodi; Adriano; Zookids	2:49
13.	"Pressure"	Moore; Dijon McFarlane	Mustard	2:16
14.	"No Rest"	Moore; Brody; Devin Phillion; Will Steller	Brody; UV Killin Em; Steller	2:34
15.	"Letter to My Son"	Moore; Luca Meloni	Luca Vialli; Juvy Catcher; ProdbyJeff	2:06
Total length:				38:39

== Personnel ==
- Roddy Ricch – vocals
- Nicolas De Porcel – mastering (1–6, 8–15)
- Glenn Schick – mastering (7)
- Chris Dennis – mixing, engineering
- Cyrus "Nois" Taghipour – mixing (1–6, 8–15)
- Derek "MixedByAli" Ali – mixing (1–6, 8–15)
- Demitrius Lewis II – mastering assistance (1–6, 8–15)
- Brandon Blatz – mixing assistance (1–6, 8–15)
- Curtis "Sircut" Bye – mixing assistance (1–6, 8–15)
- Byrd Beatz – programming (7)
- Aleksi Godard – engineering assistance (7)

== Charts ==
Chart performance for Feed Tha Streets III
Chart (2022)	Peak position
Canadian Albums (Billboard)	34
US Billboard 200	14
US Top R&B/Hip-Hop Albums (Billboard)	6
