= Precision (song) =

2024 single by Big Sean

Single by Big Sean

from the album Better Me Than You
- Released: March 22, 2024
- Genre: Hip hop; trap
- Length: 2:47
- Label: FF to Def; Def Jam
- Songwriters: Sean Anderson; Michael Mulé; Isaac De Boni; Aaron Booe; Travis Walton; Tom Kahre; Zacari Pacaldo I; Markus Randle; Eric Bellinger; Willie Hutchinson; Darnell Carlton; Donald Pears; Jordan Houston; Paul Beauregard; Jordan Ortiz
- Producers: FnZ; Teddy Walton; Aaron Bow; Kahre; Zacari

Big Sean singles chronology
"Master P" (2023)	"Precision" (2024)	"Shut Up" (2024)

Music video
- "Precision" on YouTube

"Precision" is a song by American rapper Big Sean. It was first previewed in August 2023 through a trailer for the video game NBA 2K24 (2023), before being released on March 22, 2024, as the lead single from his sixth studio album, Better Me Than You. The song contains a sample of "Poppin' My Collar" by Three 6 Mafia and was produced by FnZ, Teddy Walton, Aaron Bow, Tom Kahre and Zacari.

== Background ==
On August 31, 2023, a minute-long snippet of the song appeared in the trailer of NBA 2K24. The video's description stated the song would be featured on Big Sean's upcoming sixth album.

== Composition and lyrics ==
"Precision" uses the same sample from "Poppin' My Collar", composed of a "jazzy horn section and added sniper sounds" originally borrowed from "Theme of the Mack" by Willie Hutch and a trap beat. Through a rapid-fire performance, he discusses topics such as his family and charity. In the chorus, he raps "Shootin' my shot like, pew-pew, aye / Get the red dot like, pew-pew, aye / Finger on the trigger like pew-pew-pew-pew, aye, aye, aye." He also raps about having studied his target and never missing it, and at one point mentions dismissing the criticism from his haters.

== Critical reception ==
The song received generally positive reviews. Zachary Horvath of HotNewHipHop remarked, "One thing we can say for certain is that Big Sean has tons of 'Precision' when it comes to his flows. There are not many mainstream MCs that have better pure rapping skills than him. While there a still a couple of so-so bars, we do not have much to nitpick." Ahmad Davis of Rap-Up wrote in regard to Big Sean, "Although he had taken some time off to recharge and adjust to fatherhood, the multi-platinum bar spitter seemed to be in tip-top shape." Shawn Grant of The Source stated the song "showcases Big Sean's signature lyrical prowess, delivered with rapid-fire precision over a dynamic blend of soulful samples and infectious beats."

== Music video ==
An official music video was directed by Onda and released alongside the single. It sees Big Sean in a Dragon Ball Z-like diving chamber, being measured by an attractive tailor, walking on a treadmill, meditating in front of a green screen, riding in an old-school convertible and shooting hoops in a cartoonish setting.

== Charts ==
Chart performance for "Precision"
Chart (2024)	Peak position
New Zealand Hot Singles (RMNZ)	39
US Bubbling Under Hot 100 (Billboard)	19
US Rhythmic Airplay (Billboard)	31
