= Wins & Losses =

Studio album by Meek Mill
- Released: July 21, 2017
- Recorded: 2016–17
- Genre: Hip-hop
- Length: 66:54
- Label: Maybach; Atlantic
- Producer: Rick Ross (exec.); Meek Mill (also exec.); 8x8; Cardiak; DJ Mustard; Dougie; D.O. Speaks; Future; G Koop; Honorable C.N.O.T.E.; iBeatz; Illmind; Infamous Rell; James Royo; Maaly Raw; MP808; Papamitrou; Larrance Dopson; RaRa; Stoopid on da Beat; Streetrunner; Street Symphony; Tarik Azzouz; Tazzaracci; Wheezy

Meek Mill chronology
Meekend Music (2017)	Wins & Losses (2017)	Legends of the Summer (2018)

Singles from Wins & Losses
- 1. "Whatever You Need" Released: June 1, 2017; 2. "Young Black America" Released: June 25, 2017

Wins & Losses is the third studio album by American rapper Meek Mill. It was released on July 21, 2017, by Maybach Music Group and Atlantic Records Group. It is the follow-up to Meek Mill's second album Dreams Worth More Than Money (2015) and his Meekend Music EP series. It includes guest appearances from Rick Ross, Future, Quavo, Young Thug, Lil Uzi Vert, Chris Brown, Ty Dolla Sign, Yo Gotti, The-Dream, Teyana Taylor, and Verse Simmonds. Production derives from Meek Mill's first signed Dreamchaser producer Papamitrou, Streetrunner, DJ Mustard, Street Symphony, Wheezy, Maaly Raw, Dougie On The Beat and Honorable C.N.O.T.E.

Wins and Losses received generally positive reviews and debuted at number three on the Billboard 200 with 102,000 album-equivalent units, of which 37,000 were pure album sales. It has gone on to sell more than 500,000 units in the United States and is certified gold. The album was supported by two singles: Whatever You Need featuring Chris Brown and Ty Dolla Sign, and "Young Black America" featuring The-Dream.

== Background ==
After releasing numerous EPs such as 4/4 (2016) and the Meekend Music series (2017), Wins and Losses was announced in May 2017 by Rick Ross, while the album cover and tracklist were revealed in mid-July 2017 a few weeks before release. Meek Mill explained the concept behind Wins and Losses during an interview with Streetz 94.5, saying:

"I just wanted to give people a real perspective of my life, what we call wins and what we call losses. I lost my case, we lost Lil Snupe, Chino lost his brother. Where we come from, that's a loss. When you talk L's and W's, you get an L, that mean you got life in jail. It's critical, it ain't what they talking about, so I wanted to give my perspective on it, let people know what I've been through."

== Promotion ==
On June 2, 2017, Meek Mill partnered with Spotify and released a video of him freestyling. The video premiered on the playlist "Rap Caviar". Meek Mill officially acknowledged the album in it. On July 10, 2017, Meek Mill released a trailer for the album as well as a trailer for a short film titled, Wins and Losses: The Movie. The movie was directed by Spike Jordan. He also released the official cover artwork for Wins and Losses the same day. Wins and Losses: The Movie was released in 4 parts, and was uploaded to YouTube daily from July 17 until July 20, 2017, leading up to the release of the album. The full movie was uploaded to YouTube the day the album was released, the film featured music from the album. Meek Mill went on to promote the album with interviews from Hot 97 and Power 105.1 leading up to release.

=== Singles ===
The lead single, "Whatever You Need" featuring Chris Brown and Ty Dolla Sign, was released on June 1, 2017. The song was produced by DJ Mustard, with co-production from James Royo and Rance from musical ensemble 1500 or Nothin'. The song samples "Whatever You Want" by Tony! Toni! Toné!. It has since peaked at number 51 on the US Billboard Hot 100.

The second single, "Young Black America" featuring The-Dream was released on June 24, 2017, accompanied by a music video. The song was produced by Street Symphony and D.O. Speaks, and samples "Blueprint (Momma Loves Me)", by Jay-Z. On August 17, 2017, Meek performed the song on the Tonight Show Starring Jimmy Fallon.

=== Other songs ===
Meek Mill released "Glow Up" as a promotional single on May 22, 2017, and the music video was released the next day. Meek Mill released the "Issues" on July 13, 2017, the music video was released the next day and features cameo appearances from PnB Rock, Jim Jones, XXXTentacion, and Danny García. On July 24, 2017, it was revealed by YouTube personality DJ Akademiks that the clean version of "1942 Flows" features an extended second verse, that allegedly contains a subliminal diss aimed at fellow rapper Drake.

On July 28, 2017, Meek Mill released the music video for "We Ball" featuring Young Thug. WorldStarHipHop premiered the music video for "Price" on August 1, 2017.

== Critical reception ==
Professional ratings
Aggregate scores
Source	Rating
Metacritic	72/100
Review scores
Source	Rating
AllMusic	3.5/5 stars
Exclaim!	5/10
HotNewHipHop	75%
Pitchfork	7.4/10
PopMatters	6/10
Salute Magazine	4.25/5 stars
XXL	(XL)

Wins & Losses received generally positive reviews from critics upon release. At Metacritic, which assigns a normalized rating out of 100 to reviews from mainstream publications, the album received an average score of 72, based on four reviews. Sheldon Pearce of Pitchfork praised the album's subject matter, commenting: "Much like his major label debut, Dreams and Nightmares, his new album juxtaposes rap dreams and hood realities, but draws more deliberate distinctions. He recognizes rapping as salvation from street life, not some gladiatorial clash inside an echo chamber. Meek makes the case there’s more than one way to win, and that being bested in the rap coliseum isn’t nearly as devastating a blow as seeing close friends die. Subliminal shots don’t hit the way real ones do. The album is a comeback by any measure, honest and gripping." In a positive review for HotNewHipHop, Richard Bryan said Win & Losses "seems, primarily, to be about emotional growth for Meek Mill—even an outlet for it—and Meek coming to an understanding that life is about both successes and failures." Writing for The Ringer, Justin Charity praised the album, declaring it Meek Mill's "most polished and passionate album of his troubled career." M.T Richards of Exclaim! was more critical of the album, describing it as "a letdown." He wrote: "From 'Save Me' to '1942 Flows,' 'Glow Up' to 'These Scars,' the songs here are grayish and oppressively monochromatic, with stiff, sedate drums. 'Heavy Heart' is a lone reminder that intestinal fortitude used to be Meek's province, but overall, Wins & Losses is mostly the latter."

In a mixed review for PopMatters, writer William Sutton called the album "safe." He added that the album is "a good listen in places and evidence of Meek’s skillset. However, it doesn’t feel like it will be enough to reverse the losses that so many feel he has suffered of late. Writing for Mass Appeal, Khari Nixon wrote a largely positive review, saying: "while Wins and Losses may not be an instant classic, it stands as both a reminder and a statement of purpose for a talented MC whose skills bar for bar can’t be denied. Don't get lost in the hip-hop soap opera, when it comes to this rap shit, Meek Mill is still winning." Scott Glaysher of XXL commented that "Meek has visibly shifted his dial from 'completely lost' to 'approaching victory.'" He continued, "If nothing else, Wins & Losses is a display of optimism from a rapper who briefly yet substantially fell from hip-hop's good graces but aims to make his way back in a major way."

== Commercial performance ==
Wins and Losses debuted at number three on the US Billboard 200 with 102,000 album-equivalent units, of which 37,000 were pure album sales in its first week of release. In its second week, the album remained at number three on the chart earning 37,000 album-equivalent units. In its third week the album fell to number four on the chart.

== Track listing ==
Credits adapted from Tidal.

Wins & Losses — Standard version
No.	Title	Writer(s)	Producer(s)	Length
1.	"Wins & Losses"	Robert Williams; Nikolas Papamitrou; Andrew Lloyd-Webber	Papamitrou	3:09
2.	"Heavy Heart"	Williams; Nicholas Warwar; Tarik Azzouz; Clemm Rishad; Sitara Kanhai	Streetrunner; Tarik Azzouz	4:10
3.	"Fuck That Check Up" (featuring Lil Uzi Vert)	Williams; Symere Woods; Terrell McNeal; Rodriquez Smith	MP808; RaRa; Tazzaracci^{[c]}	4:17
4.	"Whatever You Need" (featuring Chris Brown and Ty Dolla Sign)	Williams; Christopher Brown; Tyrone Griffin, Jr.; Dijon McFarlane; James Royo; Larrance Dopson; Carl Wheeler; D'wayne Wiggins	DJ Mustard; Larrance Dopson^{[a]}; Royo^{[b]}	3:25
5.	"1942 Flows"	Williams; Douglas Whitehead	Dougie	4:42
6.	"Issues"	Williams; Whitehead; Carl McCormick; Maurice Simmonds	Dougie; Cardiak^{[a]}	3:31
7.	"We Ball" (featuring Young Thug)	Williams; Jeffery Williams; Wesley Glass	Future; Wheezy^{[a]}	3:47
8.	"These Scars" (featuring Future and Guordan Banks)	Williams; Nayvadius Wilburn; Guordan Banks; Papamitrou; Alan Hawkshaw	Papamitrou	3:14
9.	"Connect the Dots" (featuring Yo Gotti and Rick Ross)	Williams; Mario Mims; William Roberts II; Jahlil Beats x Papamitrou	Papamitrou	4:06
10.	"Fall Thru"	Williams; István Megymorecz; Robert Mandell; Rico Brooks	iBeatz; G Koop	3:42
11.	"Never Lose" (featuring Lihtz Kamraz)	Williams; Andrew Howard; Terrell Johnson; Ramon Ibanga, Jr.	Infamous Rell; Illmind^{[a]}	3:56
12.	"Glow Up"	Williams; Carlton Mays, Jr.	Honorable C.N.O.T.E.	3:30
13.	"Young Black America" (featuring The-Dream)	Williams; Terius Nash; Torrance Esmond; Derrick Okoth; Shawn Carter	Street Symphony; D.O. Speaks	4:01
14.	"Open" (featuring Verse Simmonds)	Williams; Simmonds; Esmond; Matt Massaro; Okoth; Corbin Smidzik	Street Symphony; 8x8; D.O. Speaks	4:28
15.	"Ball Player" (featuring Quavo)	Williams; Quavious Marshall; Jamaal Henry	Maaly Raw	4:11
16.	"Made It from Nothing" (featuring Teyana Taylor and Rick Ross)	Williams; Teyana Taylor; Roberts; Warwar; Azzouz; Adela Hassan; Atia Boggs	Streetrunner; Tarik Azzouz	4:09
17.	"Price"	Williams; Warwar; Azzouz; Rishad; Daniel Templeman; Edward Thomas; Ruby Wood; Simon Beddoe; Tarek Modi; Christopher Hargreaves; Thomas Evans; Dominic Howard	Streetrunner; Tarik Azzouz	4:36
Total length:				66:54

Wins & Losses — Deluxe version
No.	Title	Writer(s)	Producer(s)	Length
18.	"Left Hollywood"	Williams; Juan Peters; Joshua Keogh	Stoopid on da Beat	3:42
19.	"Save Me"	Williams; Whitehead; Giselle Rosselli	Dougie	4:35
Total length:				74:31

Notes

- ^{^[a]} signifies a co-producer
- ^{^[b]} signifies an additional producer
- ^{^[c]} signifies an uncredited additional producer
- "Wins & Losses" features additional vocals by Dr. Eric Thomas
- "Heavy Heart" features additional vocals by Sitara Kanhai
- "Fall Thru" features additional vocals by Aria Minor
- "Made It from Nothing" features additional vocals by Adela

Sample credits

- "Wins & Losses" contains a sample from Variation 8, performed by Andrew Lloyd Webber.
- "Whatever You Need" contains a sample from "Whatever You Want", performed by Tony! Toni! Toné!.
- "These Scars" contains a sample of Alan Hawkshaw's original composition "Strangelands".
- "Young Black America" contains a sample from "Blueprint (Momma Loves Me)", performed by Jay-Z.
- "Open" contains a sample from "Worn", performed by Corbin.
- "Price" contains a sample from "Empty Love", performed by Submotion Orchestra.
- "Left Hollywood" contains a sample from "I Found", performed by Amber Run.
- "Save Me" contains a sample from "Crave You (Adventure Club Remix)", performed by Giselle Rosselli and Flight Facilities.

== Personnel ==
Credits adapted from Tidal.

Musicians

- Marie Breton – guitar (tracks 2, 17)
- Maxine Phillippe – guitar (tracks 2, 17)

Technical

- Anthony Cruz – recording (all tracks)
- James Belt – recording assistant (tracks 1–15, 17)
- William Dougan – recording assistant (tracks 1–15, 17)
- Junie On The Beat – recording assistant (track 16)
- James Royo – additional recording (track 4)
- Miles Walker – mixing (tracks 1–3, 5–11, 13–17)
- Jaycen Joshua – mixing (tracks 4, 12)
- Ryan Jumper – mixing assistant (tracks 1–3, 5–11, 13–16), mixing (track 17)
- David Nakaji – mixing assistant (track 4, 12)
- Ivan Jimenez – mixing assistant (track 4, 12)
- Colin Leonard – mastering (tracks 1–17)

Additional personnel

- Will Ngo – photography
- Chaz Morgan – art direction

== Charts ==
=== Weekly charts ===
Chart (2017)	Peak position
Australian Albums (ARIA)	91
Belgian Albums (Ultratop Flanders)	112
Canadian Albums (Billboard)	17
Dutch Albums (Album Top 100)	13
French Albums (SNEP)	121
New Zealand Heatseekers Albums (RMNZ)	3
Norwegian Albums (VG-lista)	37
UK Albums (Official Charts)	21
US Billboard 200	3
US Top R&B/Hip-Hop Albums (Billboard)	2

=== Year-end charts ===
Chart (2017)	Position
US Billboard 200	103
US Top R&B/Hip-Hop Albums (Billboard)	35

== Certifications ==
Region	Certification	Certified units/sales
United States (RIAA)	Gold	500,000^{‡}
^{‡} Sales+streaming figures based on certification alone.
