= Zoya (singer) =

American singer-songwriter (born 1993)

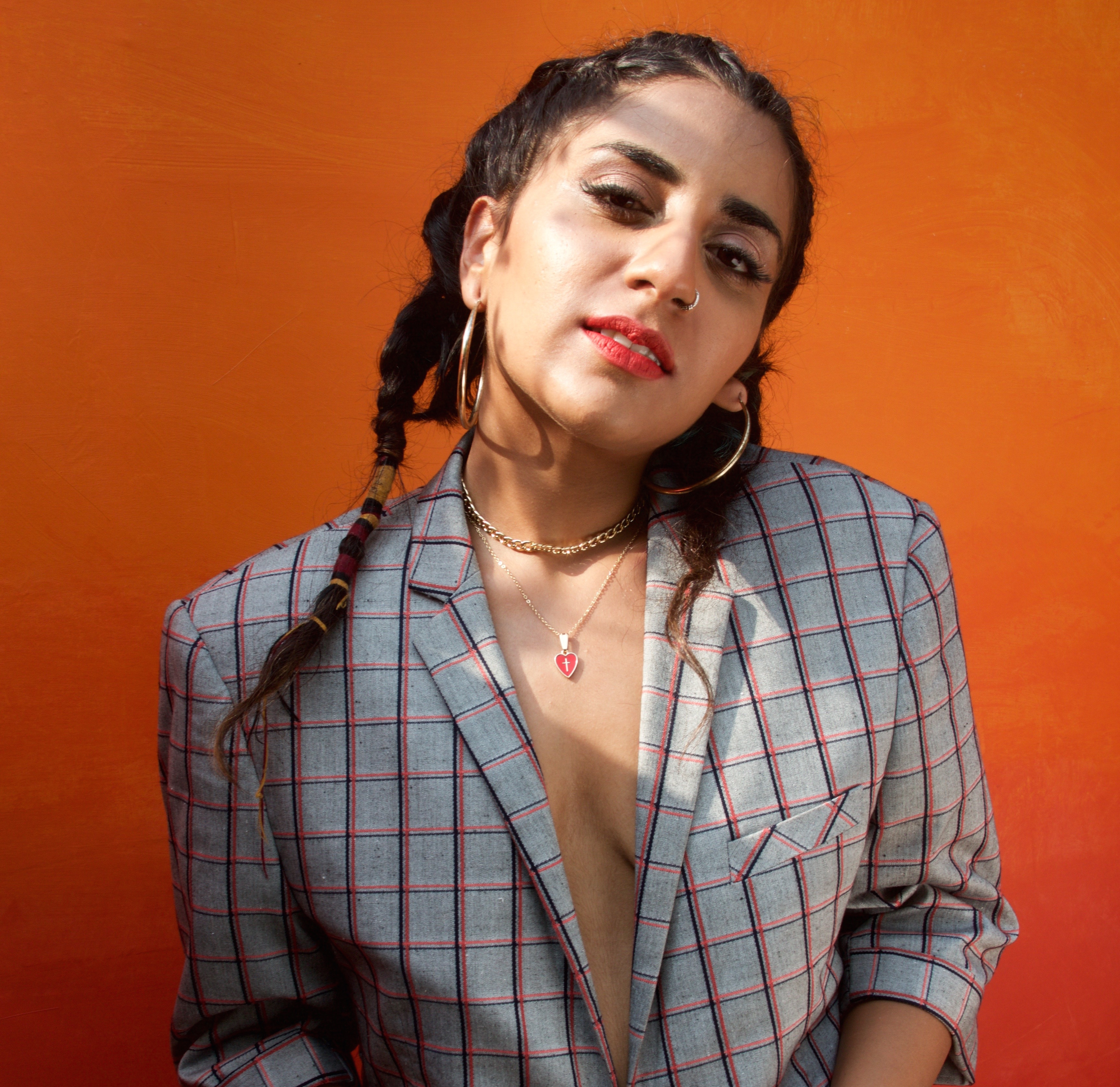
- Born: April 11, 1993 (age 33); New Delhi, India
- Citizenship: United States
- Occupation: Recording Artist
- Agent: Create Music Group
- Notable work: Bad Girls Dream (Ft. Jack Harlow)
- Website: www.zoya.life

Zoya (born April 11, 1993) is an American singer, songwriter, guitarist, and music business entrepreneur. She has gained recognition from AR Rahman and The Chainsmokers while touring on festival bills and as a support act for the likes of Natty, Lucy Rose, Madame Gandhi, Youngr, Submotion Orchestra, Bloc Party, Clean Bandit, and Martin Garrix.

Returning to Los Angeles after a four year stint touring India, Zoya kicked off her debut US album, Bad Girls Dream, with a radio-friendly pop anthem featuring Grammy-nominated and Billboard Hot 100 charting rapper, Jack Harlow.

In November 2021, Zoya launched her newest album for an industry only album premiere at The W Hotel in Hollywood, CA. In January 2022, she was chosen for Amazon Music’s Breakthrough Artist of the year.

== Life and career ==
Zoya was born in New Delhi, India in April 1993. At 6 months old, she moved with her family to Newport Beach, California, where she spent her childhood. As a teenager she attended Orange County School of the Arts in the Visual Arts and Commercial Voice Conservatory.

She began writing and performing original material in local bars and coffeehouses on the California coast. Upon graduating from OCSA in 2011, Zoya began attending Berklee College of Music in Boston, MA.

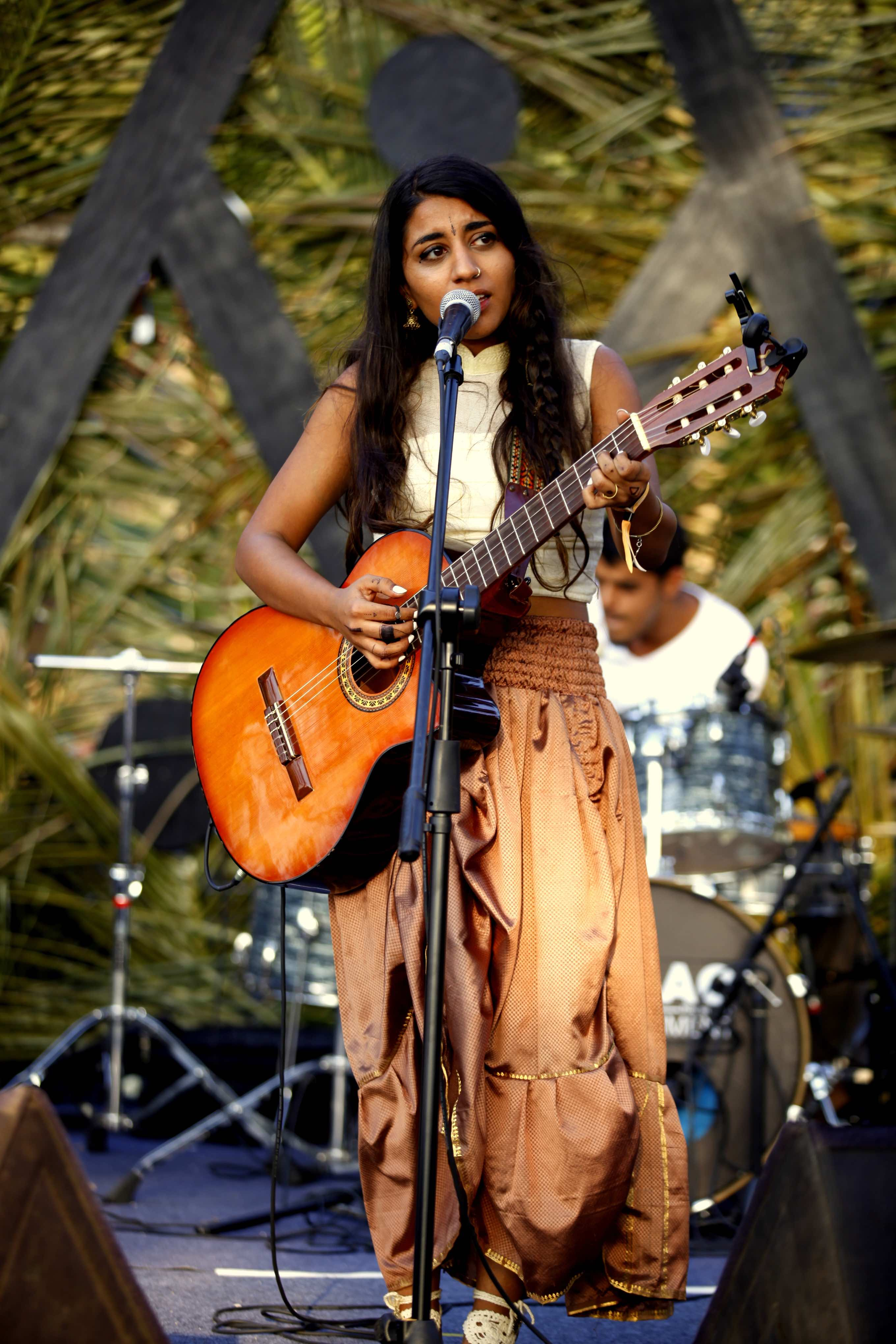
Zoya performing at Nariyal Paani Festival, Ali Baug, India

In 2013, she released Letters To Toska EP and began booking her own gigs across the East Coast and California, performing at famous music clubs like Rockwood Music Hall and Whisky A Go-Go. She opened for Storyman, Ryan Scott, at the first literature event presented by the Indo-American Arts Council featuring author, Salman Rushdie. In 2014, she released her visual EP, "Lasya", via YouTube and later opened for singer-songwriter, Kawehi, which ultimately landed her a supporting slot on Kawehi's Evolution Tour the same year.

In the summer of 2015 Zoya released her full-length album The Girl Who Used To Live in My Room. In October 2015, eight producers collaborated with Zoya to compile an electronic remix album entitled, Zoya: Plugged In.

At the end of 2015, Zoya began touring and performing shows all across India performing at festivals, venues, and presented songwriting classes at various contemporary music schools.

From 2015-2019, Zoya performed at India's biggest festivals and venues. She has gained recognition from AR Rahman and The Chainsmokers while touring on festival bills and as a support act for the likes of Natty, Lucy Rose, Madame Gandhi, Youngr, Submotion Orchestra, Bloc Party, Clean Bandit, Anderson .Paak and Martin Garrix. She also modeled and was the face of H&M x Erdem while sponsored by Vans.

Returning to Los Angeles after a four-year stint touring India, Zoya was developed by Chicago-based label and management agency, Propelr Music. Teaming up with producers Chuck Inglish (Chance the Rapper, 6LACK) and Mark Nilan Jr. (Lady Gaga, A Star Is Born), Zoya kicked off her latest Bad Girls Dream series with a radio-friendly pop anthem featuring Grammy-nominated and Billboard Hot 100 charting rapper, Jack Harlow.

== Discography ==
- Letters To Toska (2013)
- Lasya (visual EP) (2014)
- The Girl Who Used To Live in My Room (2015)
- Zoya: Plugged In (electronic remix compilation) (2015)
- Natural Disaster (2016)
- The Kingdom (Single Series) (2017–2018)
- Afterglow (Single Series) (2018–present)
- Bad Girls Dream Ft. Jack Harlow (Single)
- Here (Single)
- Worth It (Single)
- Bad Girls Dream LP

== Philanthropy ==
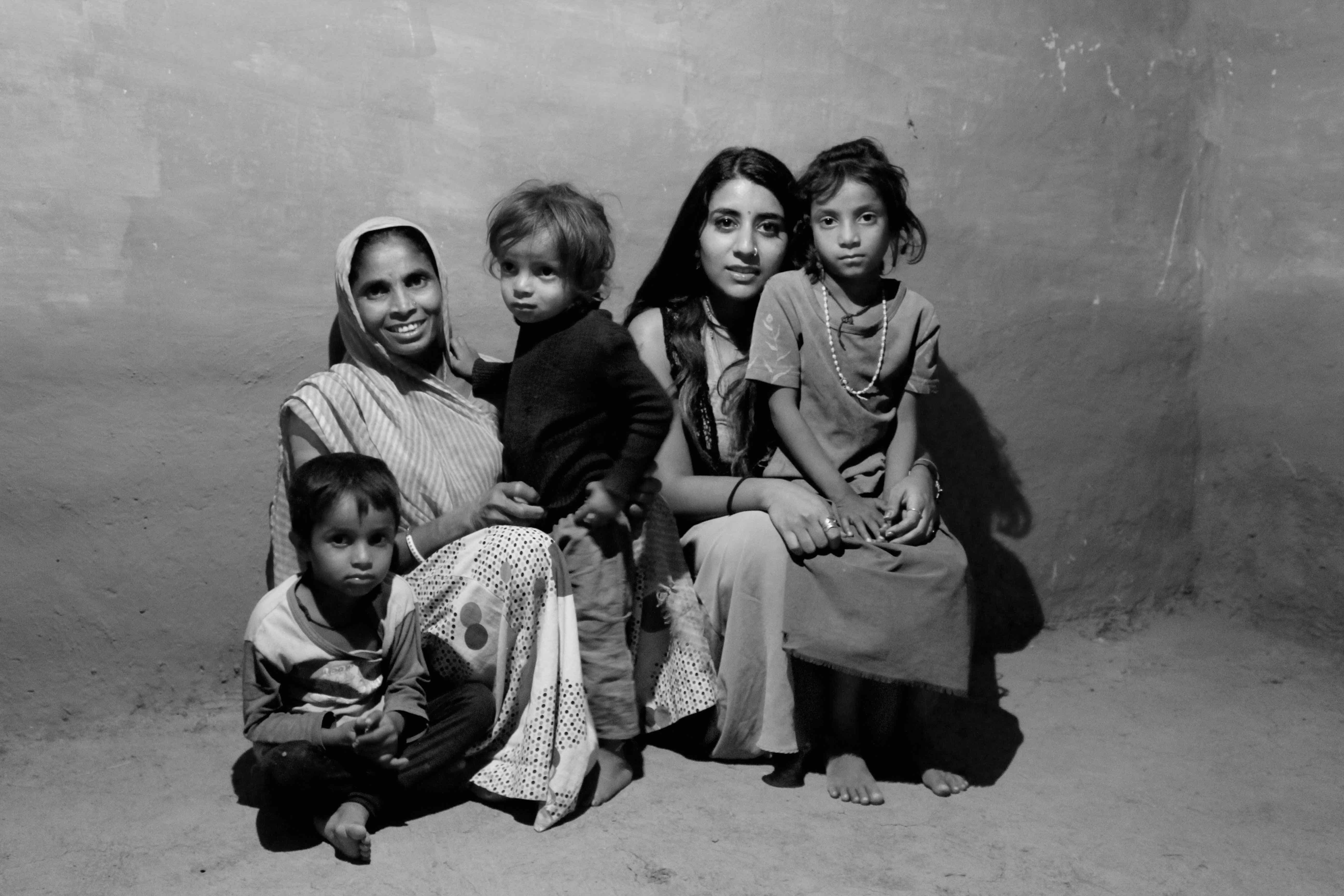
Zoya visiting families for the#powerofpower campaign in Udaipur, India

In 2015, proceeds from Zoya's remix album Zoya: Plugged In, were donated to the "Electronic Music for Electricity" Campaign, a fund created to install electricity in government and non-government schools in rural India. The album features eight remixes, all created by different producers, from Zoya's albums The Girl Who Used To Live In My Room & Letters To Toska. The campaign aimed to raise funds for schools in need of electricity in order to provide a better educational environment for children in rural India.
