= Asiola =

Crowdfunding platform in Thailand

- Company type: Private
- Website type: Crowdfunding
- Headquarters: Thailand
- Founders: Jon Lor; Sanji Tandan; Chris Hwang; Pranitan “Pete” Phornprapha; Montonn “Jay” Jira; Khanngoen “Khan” Nuanual
- Website: asiola.com
- Launched: November 24, 2015; 10 years ago

Asiola is an online crowdfunding platform built to support creative and community-driven ideas in Thailand. It was launched in 2015 in Bangkok by a group of founders comprising technology experts, music industry experts and artists in response to Thailand's burgeoning startup scene. Their aim was to provide a way for fledgling ideas to gather attention and get funded.

Asiola's vision is to provide a platform for ideas worth supporting and connect creators of ideas with an audience. Supporters receive rewards in return for their contribution towards a campaign's funding goal and if a campaign is successful, rewards are delivered and the campaign is executed. Asiola welcomes ideas that are innovative and have potential to make a positive impact on communities in Thailand.

== Founders ==
Asiola was founded by an international team including:marketing specialist Jon Lor (CEO), Sanji Tandan - former managing director of Warner Music, IT specialist Chris Hwang (CTO), social entrepreneur Pranitan "Pete" Phornprapha, Thai musician Montonn "Jay" Jira and Khanngoen "Khan" Nuanual of Thai rap group, Thaitanium.

== Model ==
Currently, Asiola operates on a rewards-based crowdfunding model, where funds are raised for a project by supporters who invest in an idea that inspires them by pledging a contribution in return for a reward. These can be tangible products or items, or intangible rewards like services or, in the case of community-driven campaigns, a sense of being part of something worthwhile. There are two types of campaigns: all-or-nothing and unconditional.

=== All-or-nothing campaigns ===
These are campaigns that must reach their funding goal within the allotted time period. If they do not reach their target before the campaign deadline, the project is not funded, supporters do not get charged and do not receive their rewards.

=== Unconditional campaigns ===
Any and all funding raised towards an unconditional campaign goes to the campaign creator and supporters receive their rewards after the campaign deadline, whether or not the campaign reached its funding target.

The founders cite plans to expand the model to incorporate equity-based crowdfunding in the future.

== Launch ==
The official launch of Asiola took place on 24 November 2015 and featured panel discussions from the team of founders, Khun Teeranun Srihong, President of Kasikorn Bank.

== Campaigns ==
=== 2017 ===
In January 2017, volunteers Ken and Fai successfully funded "Operation Clean-up", raising 239,301 baht to put towards building new bathrooms at Ban Katiad School in Ubon Ratchathani. Creative Designer of Wonderfruit, Adam Pollina crowdfunded and built Wonder Kar - the festival's first moving art installation. In February, Ookbee Comic Books artists, MOYOYA, NALU and FAHFAHS raised 92,000 baht (110% of their funding goal) to put on an exhibition of their combined works at Siam Square in Bangkok.

=== 2016 ===
In 2016, notable campaigns included Thaitay Rap Boot Camp - a hip hop workshop with Thai rap group Thaitanium. The group raised 104% of the funding goal and the event took place at Rockademy Thailand in April 2016. Street Strength - an urban dance and fitness event, was conceived by WeGotTheSpot. They raised 134% of the funding goal and the event, which brought together dancers, fitness and martial arts enthusiasts for workshops, competitions and performances, took place in April 2016. Street artist Alex Face crowdfunded Peace for Bangkok - a public art project. The campaign reached 132% of its funding goal and the artist completed the large-scale mural in central Bangkok in May 2016. Thai musician Montonn Jira raised 1033% of his funding goal to throw Bangkok's first ever "Techno Pizza Party". Young Presidents' Organization (YPO) successfully raised 101% of their funding goal for Right to Breathe, a campaign to tackle northern Thailand's haze problem through education programs among young Thai farmers. Street photographer S.S.V.S raised 109% of his funding goal to rebuild a school in Loei province; Khan Nuanual hit 108% in his campaign to build proper housing for the monks at remote forest temple, Wat Klang - also in Loei. Towards the end of the year, Immanual Music School raised 218% of their funding goal for "From Klongtoey to Concert Hall" and put on a concert featuring young, disadvantaged musicians.

=== 2015 ===
The platform's first campaign to be successfully funded was "Into the Wind", an art installation by Thai artist "O" Witaya Junma, which appeared at Wonderfruit festival in December 2015.
