= Outta Time (Bryson Tiller song) =

2020 single by Bryson Tiller featuring Drake

Single by Bryson Tiller featuring Drake

from the album Anniversary
- Released: October 20, 2020
- Length: 3:18
- Label: RCA
- Songwriters: Bryson Tiller; Aubrey Graham; Tyler Bryant; Josh Valle; Noah Shebib; Paul Jeffries; Anderson Hernandez; Snoh Nowrozi; Marcus James
- Producers: 40; Nineteen85; Vinylz

Bryson Tiller singles chronology
"Always Forever" (2020)	"Outta Time" (2020)

Drake singles chronology
"You're Mines Still" (2020)	"Outta Time" (2020)	"Talk to Me" (2021)

Visualizer
- "Outta Time" on YouTube

"Outta Time" is a song by American singer Bryson Tiller featuring Canadian rapper Drake, from Tiller's third studio album, Anniversary. Produced by frequent Drake collaborators Vinylz, Nineteen85 and 40, the song samples Snoh Aalegra's "Fool for You" and finds the artists reflecting on their respective relationships. Drake is the first featured artist to appear on any of Tiller's studio albums. The song was sent to US urban radio on October 20, 2020, as the third single from Anniversary.

== Background ==
The song is the only track on Tiller's Anniversary with a credited guest appearance, as he brought in the services of Drake to contribute a verse. Tiller revealed that Drake was due to collaborate with him five years earlier on Tiller's 2015 album Trapsoul, but the plans fell through and he had been trying to sort out a collaboration ever since. Tiller, despite being impressed by Drake's contribution, was hesitant to release the song because of his mental state, until his manager heard it and urged him to include it on Anniversary. The song was originally meant for Tiller's upcoming project, Serenity. Drake had shown support toward Tiller before the release of Trapsoul, and at one point wanted to sign him to OVO, following the success of Tiller's song, "Don't".

Tiller first played the song during a surprise Zoom listening session shortly before the album's release.

== Composition and lyrics ==
"Outta Time" consists of a "sensual and airy" beat, with a pitched up sample of Snoh Aalegra's "Fool for You", sang by R&B artist Tone Stith, which is transformed into another instrument in the mix. The song does not have a chorus, finding the artists detailing their failing romantic relationships, which they eventually decide to end.

== Critical reception ==
HotNewHipHop's Noor Lobad said, because the song lacks a hook, it "narrowly miss[es] out on being able to claim the album's pinnacle, and lowering the song's overall sing-along friendliness". Dre D. of the same publication named the track a standout from its parent album, and said considering how long they have teased a collaboration (since 2017), it is "fitting, then, that the sole feature on Anniversary is none other than Drake himself".

== Commercial performance ==
"Outta Time" has peaked at number six on the New Zealand Hot Singles chart, and also reached number 24 on the UK Singles Chart in its first week on both charts.

== Charts ==
Chart (2020–2021)	Peak position
Australia (ARIA)	60
Canada Hot 100 (Billboard)	31
Ireland (IRMA)	68
New Zealand Hot Singles (RMNZ)	6
Switzerland (Schweizer Hitparade)	77
UK Singles (Official Charts)	24
US Billboard Hot 100	48
US Hot R&B/Hip-Hop Songs (Billboard)	22
US Rhythmic Airplay (Billboard)	26

== Certifications ==
Certifications and sales for "Outta Time"
Region	Certification	Certified units/sales
Canada (Music Canada)	Platinum	80,000^{‡}
New Zealand (RMNZ)	Gold	15,000^{‡}
South Africa (RISA)	Platinum	40,000^{‡}
United Kingdom (BPI)	Silver	200,000^{‡}
^{‡} Sales+streaming figures based on certification alone.

== Release history ==
Country	Date	Format	Label	Ref.
Various	October 2, 2020	Digital download; streaming	RCA	
United States	October 20, 2020	Urban contemporary radio	RCA	
