= Stop Breathing =

2022 single by Roddy Ricch

Single by Roddy Ricch

from the album Feed Tha Streets III
- Released: September 30, 2022
- Length: 1:50
- Label: Atlantic
- Songwriters: Rodrick Moore, Jr.; Chandler Durham; Tahj Morgan; Darryl Clemons; Ashot Akopian; Austin Post
- Producers: Turbo; JetsonMade; Pooh Beatz; Shottie

Roddy Ricch singles chronology
"Ghetto Superstar" (2022)	"Stop Breathing" (2022)	"B.R.O. (Better Ride Out)" (2022)

Music video
- "Stop Breathing" on YouTube

"Stop Breathing" is a song by American rapper Roddy Ricch, released on September 30, 2022, as the lead single from his third mixtape Feed Tha Streets III (2022). The song serves as his first solo single in more than a year. It was produced by Turbo, JetsonMade, Pooh Beatz, and Shottie.

== Composition and lyrics ==
In the song, Roddy Ricch rap-sings about the wealth and material possessions that he has obtained as a result of his success: "Look out the window, what do I see? / A couple yachts, they got some thots that trot the seven seas / Got CCs and Louis Vs out of every season/ Card me please, Forgis make 'em stop breathin'". Moreover, he mentions receiving a Ferrari from Mustard and being free from everyday struggles.

== Music video ==
The music video was released alongside the single, and sees Roddy Ricch enjoying his prosperous lifestyle, such as boarding a jet and donning Louis Vuitton. The video also features clips of him with Post Malone at the Twelve Carat Tour.

== Charts ==
Chart performance for "Stop Breathing"
Chart (2022)	Peak position
Canada Hot 100 (Billboard)	90
New Zealand Hot Singles (RMNZ)	24
US Bubbling Under Hot 100 (Billboard)	4
US Hot R&B/Hip-Hop Songs (Billboard)	31
