= Meekend Music =

2017 EP by Meek Mill

EP by Meek Mill
- Released: May 6, 2017; July 4, 2017 (Part 2)
- Genre: Hip-hop
- Label: Dream Chasers Records; Maybach Music Group
- Producer: 30 Roc; Dougie; Honorable C.N.O.T.E.; Maaly Raw; Mike Will Made It; Murda Beatz; Papamitrou; Stoopid On Da Beat; Streetrunner; Tarik Azzouz

Meek Mill chronology
DC4 (2016)	Meekend Music (2017)	Wins & Losses (2017)

Meekend Music and Meekend Music 2 are the respective third and fourth extended plays by American hip-hop artist Meek Mill. They were released by Dream Chasers Records and Maybach Music Group digitally for free download and stream via all mixtape platforms on May 6, 2017, and July 4, 2017, respectively. Both Meekend Music and its second counterpart feature production by Honorable C.N.O.T.E., Maaly Raw, Murda Beatz, Stoopid On Da Beat, Dougie, Papamitrou, Mike Will Made It, 30 Roc, Streetrunner and Tarik Azzouz as well as guest appearances from ASAP Ferg, Young Thug, YFN Lucci, Barcelini and Eearz.

The Meekend Music along with the 4/4 extended play projects were used as a prelude to help promote Meek Mill's third studio album, Wins & Losses, which was later released on July 21, 2017.

== Track listing ==
Meekend Music
No.	Title	Producer(s)	Length
1.	"Slay" (featuring ASAP Ferg)	Honorable C.N.O.T.E.	3:42
2.	"Backboard" (featuring Young Thug)	Maaly Raw; Murda Beatz	3:10
3.	"Left Hollywood"	Stoopid On Da Beat	3:44

Meekend Music 2
No.	Title	Producer(s)	Length
1.	"Save Me"	Dougie	4:35
2.	"Young Nigga Dreams" (featuring YFN Lucci and Barcelini)	Papamitrou	4:10
3.	"Organized Chaos" (featuring Eearz)	Mike Will Made It; 30 Roc	4:16
4.	"Bag Talk"	Streetrunner; Tarik Azzouz	3:16

Sample credits

- "Left Hollywood" contains a sample from "I Found", performed by Amber Run.
- "Save Me" contains a sample from "Crave You (Adventure Club Remix)", performed by Flight Facilities.
- "Young Nigga Dreams" contains a sample from "Leave It All Behind (Promid Remix)", performed by Masoud.
