= Whatever You Need (Meek Mill song) =

Single by Meek Mill featuring Chris Brown and Ty Dolla Sign

from the album Wins & Losses
- Released: June 1, 2017
- Recorded: 2017
- Genre: Hip hop; R&B
- Length: 3:29
- Label: Maybach; Atlantic
- Songwriters: Robert Williams; Christopher Brown; Tyrone Griffin Jr.; Dijon McFarlane; James Royo; Larrance Dopson; Carl Wheeler; D'wayne Wiggins
- Producers: DJ Mustard; James Royo (co.); Rance 1500(co.)

Meek Mill singles chronology
"Glow Up" (2017)	"Whatever You Need" (2017)	"Young Black America" (2017)

Chris Brown singles chronology
"Privacy" (2017)	"Whatever You Need" (2017)	"African Bad Gyal" (2017)

Ty Dolla Sign singles chronology
"F with U" (2017)	"Whatever You Need" (2017)	"Love U Better" (2017)

"Whatever You Need" is a song by American rapper Meek Mill featuring American singers Chris Brown and Ty Dolla $ign. The lead single from the former's third album Wins & Losses (2017), it is a hip hop and R&B song that contains a sample of Tony! Toni! Toné!'s 1990 song "Whatever You Want" and from 1983 song "A Dream" by DeBarge.

== Track listing ==
Digital download
No.	Title	Length
1.	"Whatever You Need" (featuring Chris Brown and Ty Dolla $ign)	3:39

== Charts ==
=== Weekly charts ===
Chart (2017)	Peak position
New Zealand Heatseekers (RMNZ)	10
US Billboard Hot 100	51
US Hot R&B/Hip-Hop Songs (Billboard)	20
US R&B/Hip-Hop Airplay (Billboard)	9
US Rhythmic Airplay (Billboard)	20

=== Year-end charts ===
Chart (2017)	Position
US Hot R&B/Hip-Hop Songs (Billboard)	67

== Certifications ==
Certifications for "Whatever You Need"
Region	Certification	Certified units/sales
New Zealand (RMNZ)	Platinum	30,000^{‡}
United States (RIAA)	Platinum	1,000,000^{‡}
^{‡} Sales+streaming figures based on certification alone.
