= No Guidance =

2019 single by Chris Brown featuring Drake

Single by Chris Brown featuring Drake

from the album Indigo
- Released: June 8, 2019
- Recorded: 2018–2019
- Genre: R&B
- Length: 4:20
- Label: RCA
- Songwriters: Christopher Brown; Aubrey Graham; Joshua Huizar; Anderson Hernandez; Travis Walton; Tyler Bryant; Noah Shebib; Nija Charles; Michee Lebrun
- Lyricists: Christopher Brown; Aubrey Graham; Tyler Bryant; Nija Charles
- Producers: Vinylz; J-Louis; 40; Teddy Walton

Chris Brown singles chronology
"G Walk" (2019)	"No Guidance" (2019)	"Restroom Occupied" (2019)

Drake singles chronology
"Girls Need Love" (Remix) (2019)	"No Guidance" (2019)	"Omertà" (2019)

Music video
- "No Guidance" on YouTube

"No Guidance" is a song by American singer Chris Brown featuring Canadian rapper and singer Drake. It was released on June 8, 2019, as the fourth single from Brown's ninth studio album, Indigo (2019). The song was written by the artists alongside Velous, Nija Charles, and producers Vinylz, J-Louis, Teddy Walton, 40.

The song follows the conclusion of a highly publicized feud between Chris Brown and Drake that began in 2012 over singer Rihanna, and it represents their first one-on-one collaboration. "No Guidance" garnered positive reviews from music critics, who complimented the song's catchiness and Brown's vocal performance. The song received great success, becoming Brown's highest-charting single as a lead artist on the Billboard Hot 100 since "Forever" (2008). The song dominated on both pop and hip-hop radio, breaking the record for most weeks at number one on the R&B/Hip-Hop Airplay, being subsequently surpassed by "Go Crazy" (2020), also by Brown.

The song peaked at number five on the Billboard Hot 100, and also reached the top ten in Australia and New Zealand, Belgium, Canada, Czech Republic and UK. Among the certifications it received, it was most notably certified diamond by the Recording Industry Association of America (RIAA), making it Brown's first song to achieve this status and one of the highest-certified digital singles in the United States. Other certifications include quadruple platinum by the Australian Recording Industry Association (ARIA), triple platinum by the Canadian Recording Industry Association (MC), and double platinum by the British Phonographic Industry (BPI). The song won three Soul Train Music Awards and received a nomination for Best R&B Song at the 62nd Grammy Awards.

== Background ==
Brown and Drake have a history of feuds dating back to 2012 over singer Rihanna, which escalated in June of that year when friends of the musicians started throwing bottles at each other in a New York City nightclub. In 2013, Brown even dissed Drake on Young Jeezy's song "R.I.P. (Remix) " by rapping "Dearly departed, I bought a plane I departed/ And if you started from the bottom, go on and come out the closet," rhyming this in the song's final verse, making a clear reference to Drake and his "Started from the Bottom" single. In the following years, the artists sporadically made offensive comments aimed at each other, expressing their hatred. However, on October 12, 2018, Drake brought out the singer on his Aubrey & the Three Migos Tour date in Los Angeles and publicly ended their feud. The performance sparked rumors about a possible collaboration, and Drake later teased a collaboration with Brown on Instagram in early 2019.

Following Brown's announcement of having collaborated with Drake on his Indigo album, snippets of an initial version of the song, taken from Brown's 30th birthday party, were leaked online on May 5, 2019. On June 5, 2019, Brown hinted at the upcoming song on his social media, and just two days later, he announced its release for that very night. Even before its release, various news outlets called the song a contender for 2019's "Song of the Summer".

Drake, when discussing his reconciliation with Brown during a Tidal interview, talked about the making of the song, saying: “We’ve come together before and tried to link and make music and we were always kind of forcing it”, and after finally resolving their beef in 2018, they found it more natural to work together. Drake stated: "I just always had a lot of admiration for his talent and I think finally he gave me the mutual respect and admiration by allowing me to take the lead on the song".

== Composition ==
"No Guidance" is a mid-tempo R&B song. It was written by Brown, Drake, Velous and Nija Charles, while the production was handled by Vinylz, J-Louis, 40 and Teddy Walton. Its production contains an uncredited vocal sample of "Before I Die", written and performed by Che Ecru. In the song, the two artists express their intention to establish a life-changing love relationship with a woman, while also revealing the paranoia stemming from their respective mistakes that led to the end of their previous failed relationships.

== Critical reception ==
"No Guidance" was met with generally favorable reviews from critics. HipHopDX complimented "No Guidance", saying that it "serves as a timeless bluesy groove", and named it "the R&B song of the year". Vulture's reviewer Craig Jenkins said that: "their first proper one-on-one collaboration, sparks but never exactly glows", finding it to be "too familiar", but ending up saying that "I’ll be stuck on it for the next few days either way". Desire Thompson of Vibe stated that the song proves that Brown and Drake "make a good R&B team". HotNewHipHop commented that "the smooth production, catchy melody, and laid-back vibe made "No Guidance" an instant classic".

== Music video ==
The "No Guidance" music video was directed by Chris Robinson, and released on July 26, 2019. The video has a total run-time of 9 minutes and 6 seconds. Drake's reaction to Brown's dance during the dance battle, in which he quips "Ooo wow", has since garnered meme popularity. Singers Tory Lanez and Sevyn Streeter made cameo appearances in the video.

=== Synopsis ===
The video starts with some dialogue cuts that set up a party where the two artists accidentally meet. It later depicts the confrontation between Brown and Drake, surrounded by their crews and multiple ladies in a Miami car park, which ends up being a dance battle. During the battle, Brown executes a complex choreography during the song's last verse, while Drake responds with goofy dance moves, interpreted in a comical way. Following the confrontation, the two artists resolve their beef. The music video on YouTube has received over 500 million views as of November 2025.

== Commercial performance ==
In the United Kingdom, "No Guidance" debuted at number eight on the UK Singles Chart on the chart dated June 14, 2019, and moved up to number 6 in its second week charting. It serves as Brown's 16th top-ten song and Drake's 17th top ten on the chart. In the United States, the song debuted at number nine on the US Billboard Hot 100, making it Chris Brown's 15th top-ten song and Drake's 34th top ten on the chart. It later peaked at number five, making it Brown's first top five as a lead artist since "Forever" (2008). In Canada the song debuted at number 7.

In 2024, "No Guidance" was certified diamond by the Recording Industry Association of America (RIAA) for selling 11,000,000 units, becoming Brown's first song to do so.

== Personnel ==
Credits adapted from the album's liner notes.

- Chris Brown – lead vocals
- Drake – featured vocals
- Vinylz – production
- J-Louis – production
- Noah "40" Shebib– production
- Teddy Walton – production
- Patrizio Pigliapoco – recording
- Noel Cadastre – recording
- Noah "40" Shebib – mixing engineer
- Chris Athens – mastering engineer
- Eazy $ign – vocal engineer

== Awards and nominations ==
Among the awards and nominations "No Guidance" received, the single won Best Collaboration Performance, Best Dance Performance and Song of the Year at the 2019 Soul Train Music Awards and received a nomination for Best R&B Song at the 62nd Grammy Awards.

Ceremony	Category	Result
2019 Soul Train Music Awards	Song of the Year	Won
2019 Soul Train Music Awards	Best Collaboration	Won
2019 Soul Train Music Awards	Best Dance Performance	Won
2019 Soul Train Music Awards	Ashford & Simpson Songwriter's Award	Nominated
2019 Soul Train Music Awards	Best Video of the Year	Nominated
62nd Annual Grammy Awards	Best R&B Song	Nominated
"BET Awards 2020"	Video of the Year	Nominated
"BET Awards 2020"	Best Collaboration	Won
"BET Awards 2020"	Coca-Cola Viewer's Choice Award	Nominated
American Music Awards of 2020	Favorite Soul/R&B Song	Nominated
"2020 Billboard Music Awards"	Top R&B Song	Nominated
"2020 Billboard Music Awards"	Top Collaboration	Nominated
"2020 Billboard Music Awards"	Top Streaming Song	Nominated
"2020 iHeartRadio Music Awards"	R&B Song of the Year	Won
"51st NAACP Image Awards"	Outstanding Duo, Group or Collaboration	Nominated
"51st NAACP Image Awards"	Outstanding Music Video/Visual Album	Nominated

== Other versions ==
Different singers released their own remix versions of the track. Singer Tinashe released a remix of "No Guidance" on June 11, 2019. Rapper Fetty Wap released a freestyle of "No Guidance" on August 3, 2019. British singer Craig David performed a remix of it during a BBC Radio 1Xtra singing freestyle. A remix by artist Ayzha Nyree released in 2020 went viral on TikTok.

== Charts ==
=== Weekly charts ===
Weekly chart performance for "No Guidance"
Chart (2019–2020)	Peak position
Australia (ARIA)	7
Belgium (Ultratip Bubbling Under Flanders)	6
Canada Hot 100 (Billboard)	7
Czech Republic Singles Digital (ČNS IFPI)	10
Denmark (Tracklisten)	35
France (SNEP)	118
Germany (GfK)	63
Global 200 (Billboard)	113
Greece (IFPI)	12
Ireland (IRMA)	19
Lebanon (Lebanese Top 20)	10
Lithuania (AGATA)	22
Netherlands (Dutch Top 40 Tipparade)	7
Netherlands (Single Top 100)	36
New Zealand (Recorded Music NZ)	5
Norway (VG-lista)	40
Portugal (AFP)	28
Scottish Singles Sales (Official Charts)	34
Slovakia Singles Digital (ČNS IFPI)	52
Sweden (Sverigetopplistan)	73
Switzerland (Schweizer Hitparade)	29
UK Singles (Official Charts)	6
UK Hip Hop/R&B (Official Charts)	3
US Billboard Hot 100	5
US Hot R&B/Hip-Hop Songs (Billboard)	2
US R&B/Hip-Hop Airplay (Billboard)	1
US Adult R&B Songs (Billboard)	1
US Pop Airplay (Billboard)	24
US Rhythmic Airplay (Billboard)	1
US Dance Airplay (Billboard)	36
US Rolling Stone Top 100	2

=== Year-end charts ===
2019 year-end chart performance for "No Guidance"
Chart (2019)	Position
Australia (ARIA)	53
Canada (Canadian Hot 100)	43
New Zealand (Recorded Music NZ)	35
Portugal (AFP)	125
UK Singles (Official Charts Company)	67
US Billboard Hot 100	21
US Hot R&B/Hip-Hop Songs (Billboard)	7
US Rhythmic (Billboard)	5
US Rolling Stone Top 100	11

2020 year-end chart performance for "No Guidance"
Chart (2020)	Position
US Billboard Hot 100	36
US Hot R&B/Hip-Hop Songs (Billboard)	42
US Rhythmic (Billboard)	30

== Certifications ==
Certifications for "No Guidance"
Region	Certification	Certified units/sales
Australia (ARIA)	4× Platinum	280,000^{‡}
Canada (Music Canada)	3× Platinum	240,000^{‡}
Denmark (IFPI Danmark)	Platinum	90,000^{‡}
France (SNEP)	Platinum	200,000^{‡}
Germany (BVMI)	Gold	200,000^{‡}
Italy (FIMI)	Gold	35,000^{‡}
Mexico (AMPROFON)	Gold	30,000^{‡}
New Zealand (RMNZ)	5× Platinum	150,000^{‡}
Poland (ZPAV)	Gold	25,000^{‡}
Portugal (AFP)	Platinum	10,000^{‡}
Spain (Promusicae)	Gold	30,000^{‡}
Switzerland (IFPI Switzerland)	Gold	10,000^{‡}
United Kingdom (BPI)	2× Platinum	1,200,000^{‡}
United States (RIAA)	11× Platinum	11,000,000^{‡}
^{‡} Sales+streaming figures based on certification alone.

== See also ==
- List of highest-certified digital singles in the United States
