= B.R.O. (Better Ride Out) =

2022 single by A Boogie wit da Hoodie featuring Roddy Ricch

Single by A Boogie wit da Hoodie featuring Roddy Ricch

from the album Me vs. Myself
- Released: October 7, 2022
- Length: 2:58
- Label: Atlantic; Highbridge
- Songwriters: Artist Dubose; Rodrick Moore Jr.; Shaun Thomas
- Producers: A Boogie wit da Hoodie; S.Dot

A Boogie wit da Hoodie singles chronology
"Me, Myself & I" (2022)	"B.R.O. (Better Ride Out)" (2022)	"Lay Up n' Chill" (2022)

Roddy Ricch singles chronology
"Stop Breathing" (2022)	"B.R.O. (Better Ride Out)" (2022)	"Aston Martin Truck" (2022)

"B.R.O. (Better Ride Out)" is a song by American rapper A Boogie wit da Hoodie featuring American rapper Roddy Ricch. It was released on October 7, 2022 as the second single from the A Boogie's fourth studio album Me vs. Myself (2022). It was produced by A Boogie and S.Dot.

== Background ==
On October 4, 2022, A Boogie wit da Hoodie teased the song on Instagram with a video of him in a studio session with Roddy Ricch, before releasing it three days later.

== Composition ==
Built on a piano instrumental, the song focuses on the rappers' loyalty to their circle of friends.

== Critical reception ==
Roddy Ricch's feature was particularly praised by critics. AllMusic regarded his verse to be one of the highlights of Me vs. Myself. In an album review, Kathleen Johnston of The Daily Telegraph wrote that his feature "stands out as one of its finest efforts, with a head-bopping bass and production that is made more interesting by an acoustic piano element." Robin Murray of Clash wrote that Ricch "adds additional tone and colour" to the song.

== Charts ==
Chart performance for "B.R.O. (Better Ride Out)"
Chart (2022)	Peak position
Canada Hot 100 (Billboard)	82
New Zealand Hot Singles (RMNZ)	25
US Bubbling Under Hot 100 (Billboard)	13
US Hot R&B/Hip-Hop Songs (Billboard)	41
