= Wonderfruit =

Annual music festival taking place in Thailand

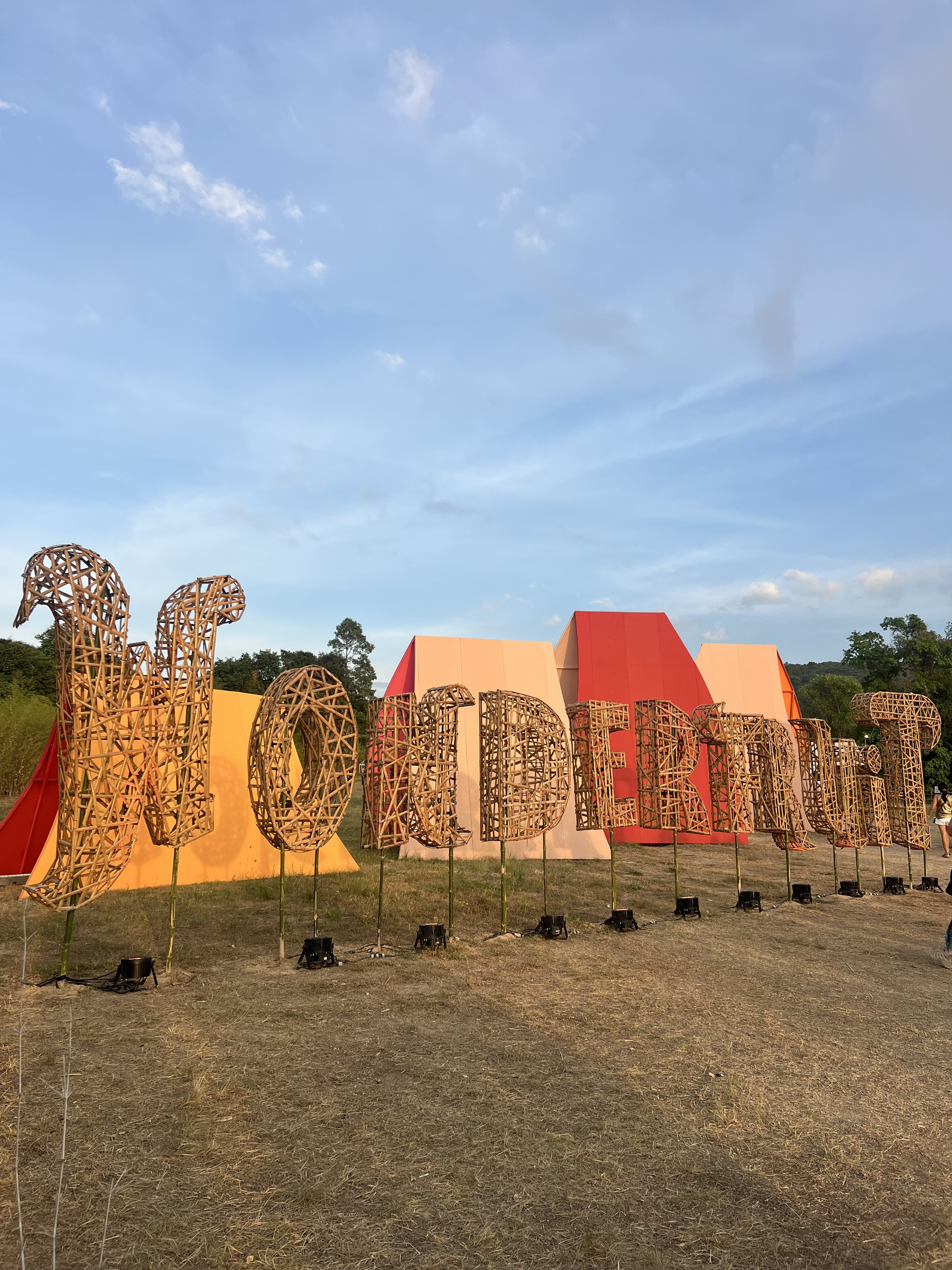
- Welcome sign at Wonderfruit festival
- Genre: Art & Culture
- Dates: 3–7 December 2026
- Locations: The Fields at Siam Country Club. Chonburi, Thailand.
- Years active: 2014–present
- Founders: Pranitan Phornprapha & Montonn Jira. Jon Lor (Managing Director)
- Attendance: 25,000
- Website: wonderfruit.co

Wonderfruit is an annual gathering for art, culture, music, and nature at The Fields at Siam Country Club, outside Pattaya in Chonburi Province, Thailand. The event features a farm, musical performances, art and architectural installations, talks, workshops, wellness activities, and feasts.

The event was launched in December 2014, produced by Thai-based production company Scratch First; the second iteration expanded from three to four days and took place a year later. Wonderfruit 2016 was originally scheduled for 15–18 December 2016. Due to a period of mourning in Thailand following the passing of His Majesty King Bhumibol Adulyadej, however, it was postponed to 16–19 February 2017. Wonderfruit returned later that year for its fourth iteration in its usual winter position over 14 to 17 December 2017. December 2018 saw the event move a kilometre east of the original site, to a larger, more topographically diverse space; the fifth edition took place from 13 to 16 December 2018. The sixth edition of Wonderfruit was staged from 12 to 16 December 2019, with a program stretching from midday Thursday 12 December to the afternoon of Monday 16 December, effectively spanning 99 hours without breaks. The festival announced it would return for its seventh year from 10 to 14 December 2020, before announcing a 12-month postponement to an undisclosed date in December 2021 due to travel restrictions and social distancing measures caused by the COVID-19 pandemic in Thailand. In lieu of a full gathering due to border closures, Wonderfruit created a smaller, localised event targeting domestic audiences in Thailand: Moobaan Wonder. The revised event was scheduled to be held across five weekends in December 2020 and January 2021, but ultimately ended after just two weekends following a resurgence of COVID-19 inside the country.

Notable musical acts have included Richie Hawtin, Roots Manuva, Izzy Bizu, Wild Beasts, Lianne La Havas, Rudimental, Young Fathers, De La Soul, Woodkid, Little Dragon, José González, Seth Troxler, Fat Freddy’s Drop, Submotion Orchestra, Chris Levine x Jon Hopkins (the iy_project), The Faint, Blonde Redhead, Goldie, Four Tet, Floating Points, Massive Attack's Daddy G, Busy P, Breakbot, Acid Pauli, Mantravine, and Nightmares on Wax. Controversy was caused in the first two years with no-shows from billed performers Chet Faker (2014) and Yasiin Bey aka Mos Def (2015).

== History ==
Wonderfruit was created by founder Pranitan “Pete” Phornprapha with Thai musician and co-founder Montonn “Jay” Jira in an effort to bring the festival experience to Thailand, with an emphasis on arts and awareness. The son of the founder of Think Earth, Pete was inspired by the environmental projects of his father’s organization but wanted to merge fun with social responsibility, and to solve environmental problems in a relevant, contemporary way. He aimed to combine quality curation and social interaction in a platform that could engage audiences.

== Pillars ==
In 2014 and 2015, Wonderfruit was structured around six "pillars": Arts, Music, Farm to Feasts, Health & Wellness, Talks & Workshops and Natural Adventures. In 2016, Wonderfruit announced a slight alteration the original list: Music, Arts, Family, Farm to Feasts, Wellness & Adventures, Talks & Workshops. In 2018, the pillars became Music, Art & Architecture, Family, Farm to Feasts, Talks & Workshops, and Wellness. In 2024, Wonderfruit restructured its focus to exploring Mind, Nature and Sound.

== Moobaan Wonder ==
Following the postponement of Wonderfruit 2020 due to the pandemic in Thailand, Wonderfruit announced Moobaan Wonder, a local-targeted event on the same grounds. Scheduled over five weekends in December 2020 and January 2021, the event celebrated Thai art, culture, and nature. It started from December 4–6 and continued from December 11–13, but the remaining weekends were canceled due to a COVID-19 resurgence and social distancing measures. Initially planned to be rescheduled, the event was ultimately canceled by February 10, 2021. Moobaan Wonder featured art, architecture, food, family activities, and workshops.

Wonderfruit banned the use of single-use cups for 2019. All attendees were required to bring their own cups to the festival, in an effort to remove some 200,000 cups from being wasted during the event (claimed). The 2019 event was awarded the Greener Creative Award for 2020 in the annual A Greener Festival Awards.
