= Submotion Orchestra =

English electronica band

- Origin: Leeds, Yorkshire, England
- Genres: Electronica
- Years active: 2009-present
- Labels: SMO Recordings, Counter Records, Exceptional Records, Circus Records
- Members: Ruby Wood; Simon 'Bobby' Beddoe; Taz Modi; Chris 'Fatty' Hargreaves; Danny Templeman
- Past members: Tommy Evans: Dom 'Ruckspin' Howard
- Website: https://www.submotion.co.uk/

Submotion Orchestra are a seven piece band formed in 2009 in Leeds, Yorkshire, England. They are influenced by dubstep, soul, ambient electronica, jazz and dub.

Their debut LP Finest Hour was released in 2011 on Exceptional Records. They have toured and performed all over the UK, Europe and worldwide, including festival shows at The Big Chill, Latitude, Glastonbury, Outlook, Bestival, and in Thailand at Wonderfruit. They have released five full-length albums and five EPs.

== Career ==
The original members of the band - Ruby Wood (vocals), Simon Beddoe (trumpet), Taz Modi (keyboards), Chris 'Fatty' Hargreaves (bass), Tommy Evans (drums), Danny Templeman (percussion) and Dom 'Ruckspin' Howard (effects, production) - came together after an Arts Council-funded event to mix electronic and classical music at York Minster in 2009. Their first EP was released in 2010 on Ranking Records, and led to a live session for BBC Radio One with Gilles Peterson. Their first album, Finest Hour, was released in 2011 on Exceptional Records to positive reviews, with BBC Music saying 'this intriguing debut suggests the group as one to keep an eye on'.

Second album Fragments followed in 2012 to more critical acclaim, with Sputnikmusic saying 'the change in overall tone and some slight tweaks to their formula easily make this one of the year’s must listen releases'. After releasing the 1968 EP on Circus Records in 2013, the band signed to Ninja Tune through their Counter Records imprint, and released Alium in 2014, the III EP in 2015 and Colour Theory in 2016.

After forming their own label, SMO Recordings, in 2018, the band released Kites, with The Skinny saying it 'marks a fine return to Submotion Orchestra's cinematic jazz roots'. Two Unplugged collections followed, with the band revisiting older tracks in an acoustic format, before touring with the Prism String Ensemble in 2023 to perform this material. In 2024, the band released the 'Five Points' EP and toured the UK to support it, including a headline appearance at the London Jazz Festival.

Their track 'All Yours' was sampled by Bryson Tiller on his track 'Right My Wrongs' in 2015, which went on to receive a 6× platinum RIAA certification.

== Discography ==
=== Albums ===
- Finest Hour (2011, Exceptional Records)
- Fragments (2012, Exceptional Records)
- Alium (2014, Counter Records)
- Colour Theory (2016, Counter Records)
- Kites (2018, SMO Recordings)
- Passed Me By (2026, SMO Recordings)

=== EPs ===
- Submotion (2010, Ranking Records)
- 1968 (2013, Circus Records)
- III (2015, Counter Records)
- Unplugged Vol.i (2020, SMO Recordings)
- Unplugged Vol.ii (2023, SMO Recordings)
- Five Points (2024, SMO Recordings)

=== Singles ===
- Blend (2020, SMO Recordings)
- Mend Me (2022, SMO Recordings)
