= J-Louis =

American record producer

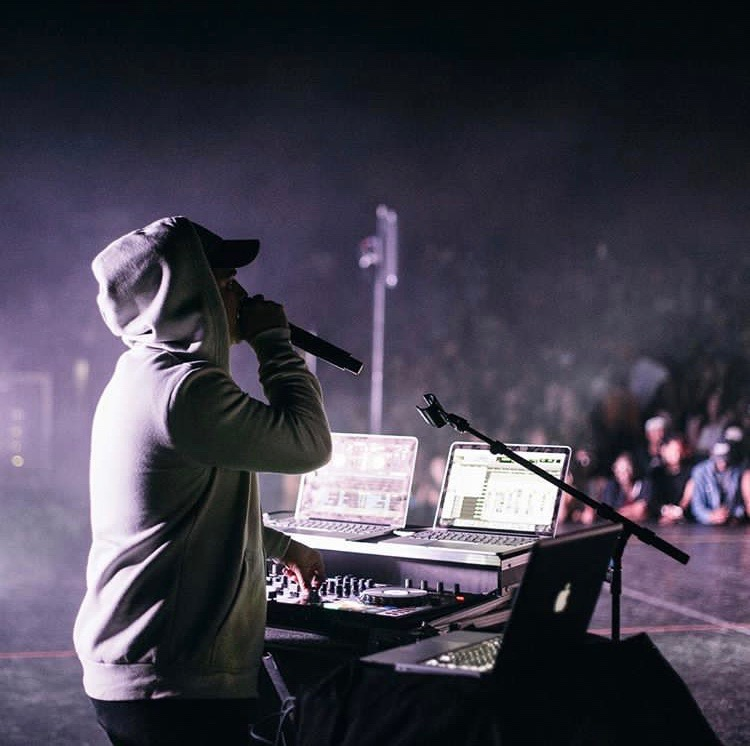

Background information
- Also known as: J-Louis
- Born: Joshua Louis Huizar; 1993 (age 32–33); Los Angeles, California, U.S.
- Genres: R&B; hip hop; soul; experimental
- Occupations: Record Producer, Songwriter, DJ
- Years active: 2011-present

Joshua Louis Huizar (born May 29, 1993, in Los Angeles, California), known professionally as J-Louis, is a Grammy-nominated American record producer and DJ. His early production was created entirely on an iPhone application called NanoStudio and he soon began to gain traction on SoundCloud, Bandcamp, and Soulection Radio. J-Louis has gone on to produce for artists including Drake, Chris Brown, Bryson Tiller, Pardison Fontaine, Cardi B, Zacari and Xavier Omar. J-Louis' fusion of R&B, hip-hop and experimental sounds has earned him multiple platinum records and placements on the Billboard Hot 100, 200, and top songwriter charts. An experienced live performer, J-Louis tours alongside Bryson Tiller as his live DJ.

== Early life ==
J-Louis grew up with an older brother who was interested in music, which inspired him to begin playing drums at the age of 8. By the age of 12, J-Louis was playing alongside his brother in a touring hardcore band called Hands On. Today, J-Louis also plays guitar, bass and keyboard.

He began learning music production on GarageBand through an after school program that allowed students to rent out Mac computers. He continued his learning at home by producing music through an iPhone application called NanoStudio.

== Career ==
In 2013, J-Louis was featured on an episode of Soulection Radio where he performed a set of original music produced and DJed entirely from his iPhone. Shortly after the broadcast, he received a direct message via SoundCloud from a listener who donated a laptop to invest in his development as a producer. J-Louis became a regular member of the Soulection team and featured on three additional shows, stating, "I represent for those people who have nothing," and emphasizing to listeners that "it's not what you use – it's how you use it." Between 2013 and 2015, J-Louis frequently released original music and remixes on SoundCloud, Bandcamp, and Soulection Radio.

J-Louis was introduced to Bryson Tiller during his time spent at Soulection studio sessions and radio shows in Santa Monica. In 2015, J-Louis earned his first placement on Tiller's "Overtime," which was certified platinum in 2017. He additionally produced "Just Another Interlude" and "502 Come Up" off of Tiller's acclaimed debut album, Trapsoul. J-Louis also became Tiller's live DJ, playing notable shows including The BET Awards, Jimmy Kimmel Live!, Red Rocks, Radio City Music Hall, the Starboy tour with Lil Uzi Vert, and a sold-out show in South Africa with Travis Scott. In 2017, J-Louis produced Tiller's "In Check" alongside friend and collaborator Teddy Walton.

In 2018, J-Louis produced Backin' It Up by Pardison Fontaine ft. Cardi B, which became certified platinum in 2019.

In 2019, J-Louis produced "No Guidance" by Chris Brown, featuring Drake, which peaked at no. 5 on Billboard's Hot 100, #1 on Billboard's Hot R&B Songs Chart and #1 on Apple Music. The single became certified platinum in August 2019, less than 10 weeks following its release. "No Guidance" also propelled J-Louis to #3 on Billboard's R&B Producers Chart. "No Guidance" was nominated for Best R&B Song at the 2020 Grammy Awards.

In 2020, J-Louis produced the tracks "Always Forever" and "Keep Doing What You're Doing" off Bryson Tiller's album Anniversary. The album debuted at no. 1 on the Billboard Top R&B Albums chart.

== Discography ==
Production and songwriting
Title	Artist(s)
2020
"Always Forever"	Bryson Tiller
"Keep Doing What You're Doing"	Bryson Tiller
2019
"No Guidance"	Chris Brown, Drake
"Blame"	Bryson Tiller
"Don’t Trip"	Zacari
"Ten Outta Ten"	Zacari
"Lone Wolf"	Zacari
"Run Wild Run Free"	Zacari
"You Can Do Anything"	Zacari
2018
"Backin' It Up"	Pardison Fontaine, Cardi B
2017
“In Check”	Bryson Tiller
Tough Love	Chris Brown
2016
“Ride”	Sonder
2015
“Just Another Interlude”	Bryson Tiller
“Overtime”	Bryson Tiller
“502 Come Up”	Bryson Tiller
“A.N.O.”	ELHAE
“Heaven Sent”	Zacari
“Foggy Windows”	Zacari
“Blind Man”	Xavier Omär

EPs
Title	Featured artist(s)
2015
Soulection White Label: 010	OriJanus
2014
Iphone Joints	
2013
Balanced	Nikko Gray

Singles
Title	Featured artist(s)
2016
“Real Her”	
2015
“22”	
“A Night Off”	DREWSTHATDUDE
“Area Codes”	Iamnobodi
“Bringing Out The Best In Me”	
“CAMARILLO”	
“Happiness”	
“I CAN’T EXPLAIN IT”	
“Looking Forward”	
“Your Girl Loves My Cooking”	
“Hollywood Nights”	Teddy Walton
“Soulchild”	
“Stay”	
Untitled	PYRMDPLZA
2014
“High Land”	
“LA Watts”	
“Scenic Route”	
“Waves”	HAAN808, Vanessa Elisha
2013
“Set the Mood”	Jordan Rakei

Remixes
Title	Original artist(s)	Co-producer
2017
“Twelve”	Abhi//Dijon	
2016
“Back It Up”	THEY	
“Sweeterman”	Drake	
“Undone”	Sonder	
2015
“Been That Way”	Bryson Tiller	
“CLIFFHANGER”	ELHAE	B-Sides
“Down On My Luck”	Vic Mensa	
“Drink’s On Us”	The Weeknd	
“Ease”	Bryson Tiller	
“Good Vibes”	abrahamblue	
“Let’s Escape”	abrahamblue	
“Sorry Not Sorry”	Bryson Tiller	Fortune
“YOU”	SLANDER, NGHTMRE	
2014
“Beautiful"	Snoop Dogg, Pharrell	
“CALLING ON YOU”	Jon B.	
“pussy”	John Rain	
“Rollin”	J-Louis	mibbs
“SAM”	ELHAE	
