= Velous =

American rapper

- Bryant in 2023

Background information
- Also known as: Young Disco
- Born: Tyler Bryant; Kingston, New York, U.S.
- Genres: Hip hop; trap; R&B
- Occupations: Rapper; singer; songwriter; record producer
- Instruments: Vocals; piano; keyboards; guitar; drums
- Years active: 2009-present
- Label: Roc Nation: Warner Chappell

Tyler Bryant, better known as his stage name Velous, is an American record producer, rapper, singer, and songwriter from Kingston, New York. Best known for his songwriting and production for other artists, he has been credited on Chris Brown's 2019 single "No Guidance" and Kanye West's 2015 single "All Day", both of which peaked within the top 20 of the Billboard Hot 100 and received Grammy Award nominations.

As a recording artist, he is known for his work with fellow New York rapper Fabolous. Bryant guest appeared on his album The Young OG Project (2014), as well as alongside Chris Brown on his 2017 single "Flipmode".

== Early life ==
Tyler Bryant was born in Kingston, New York. His father, deceased, was a musician. His mother is a singer. When he was eleven, he began rapping after listening to Kanye West's "Through the Wire". He learned how to play the drums, then piano, and started playing the guitar when he was twelve years old. He started getting into production when he was thirteen. He was also in a jazz ensemble in high school.

== Career ==
Velous came up with his name after someone told him how marvelous his production skills were; the name is "marvelous" minus the "mar". In 2011, he released his debut mixtape, Velocity The Mixtape. Its release helped Velous gain attention from Cus Maven, who signed him to Swanky Music Group. Velous met Fabolous through fellow producer Vinylz. The trio worked together for Fabolous' song "Gone For The Winter" from his sixth album, The Young OG Project in 2014. The song also marked Velous' first major guest appearance as a recording artist.

In 2014, fellow New York artist French Montana signed Velous to his label, Coke Boys Records. Montana spoke about Velous in an interview with the Village Voice: "I love his style. He sings. He raps. He's everything in one." He revealed that Velous also impressed Kanye West. "He came to the studio and played me like 1,000 songs", he said, before adding that West picked "like two beats" from Velous; one of which formed the basis of his 2015 single, "All Day". The song peaked at number 15 on the Billboard Hot 100 and received a Grammy Award nomination for Best Rap Song.

Outside of production, Veloys is perhaps best known for his guest performance on the 2014 single "Adult Swim" by DJ Spinking, having appeared alongside ASAP Ferg, Tyga, and Jeremih. Furthermore, he appeared alongside Chris Brown on Fabolous' 2017 single "Flipmode", whose music video contained cameo appearances from prominent figures in hip hop. Regarding Velous' involvement, Fabolous stated:

“When I heard the track it was a dope vibe, so I knew I wanted to become a part of the song. Chris added his touch while we were on tour together and the rest is history[.]”

Velous, alongside frequent collaborator Vinylz, co-produced Brown's 2019 single "No Guidance", which featured Canadian rapper Drake. The song peaked at number five on the Billboard Hot 100 and yielded Velous' second Grammy Award nomination for Best R&B Song.

== Discography ==
=== Singles ===
| Title | Year | Artist(s) | Album |
|---|---|---|---|
| Sex and the City | 2015 | Velous | Non-album single |
| Flex Wit You | 2016 | Velous | Non-album single |
| Flipmode | 2017 | Velous | Non-album single |
| Flipmode Remix | 2017 | Velous, Fabolous, Chris Brown | Non-album single |
| Cliche | 2017 | Velous | Non-album single |
| Dropdown | 2018 | Velous | Non-album single |
| Juiced Up | 2018 | Velous, Nav | Non-album single |
| Paris Morgan | 2025 | Velous | Non-album single |
| Still Mine | 2026 | Velous, Bryson Tiller | Non-album single |

== Awards and nominations ==
| Year | Award | Category | Nominated work | Result |
|---|---|---|---|---|
| 2015 | Grammy Awards | Best Rap Song | All Day (Kanye West) | Nominated |
| 2019 | Grammy Awards | Best R&B Song | No Guidance (Chris Brown ft. Drake) | Nominated |

== Production discography ==
List of songs as producer, co-producer, or songwriter with performing artists and other credited producers, showing year released and album name.

| Title | Year | Performing Artist(s) | Album | Role |
|---|---|---|---|---|
| Dope House Remix | 2014 | Chinx, French Montana Jadakiss | CR5 | Producer |
| Adult Swim | 2014 | DJ Spinking, Tyga, Jeremih, Velous | Non-album single | Songwriter & Producer |
| Gone for the Winter | 2014 | Fabolous, Velous | The Young OG Project | Songwriter |
| Right Hand | 2015 | Drake | Non-album single | Producer |
| All Day | 2015 | Kanye West, Allan Kingdom, Theophilus London, Paul McCartney | Non-album single | Producer |
| All Day Remix ft Kendrick Lamar | 2015 | Kanye West, Kendrick Lamar | Non-album single | Producer |
| Hitta | 2015 | Chinx | Non-album single | Producer |
| What they all say | 2015 | Chinx | Non-album single | Producer |
| Proud Side Nigga | 2015 | DJ Spinking, Velous, Ty Dolla$ign | Non-album single | Songwriter |
| Coldest Night In Hell | 2016 | Aston Matthews | Non-album single | Producer |
| Deja Vu | 2016 | J Cole | 4 Your Eyez Only | Producer |
| Barely Sober | 2016 | Belly, Lil Wayne | Another Day in Paradise | Producer |
| Money Go | 2016 | Belly, Travis Scott | Another Day in Paradise | Producer |
| The Day I Met You | 2016 | Belly | Inzombia | Producer |
| Actin Different | 2016 | Belly | Inzombia | Producer |
| Highlights | 2016 | Kanye West, Young Thug, The-Dream | The Life of Pablo | Producer |
| Flex Wit You | 2016 | Velous ft French Montana | Non-album single | Songwriter & Producer |
| Just As I Am | 2017 | SpiffTv, Prince Royce, Chris Brown | Five | Songwriter |
| Flipmode | 2017 | Velous | Non-album single | Songwriter & Producer |
| Flipmode Remix | 2017 | Velous, Fabolous, Chris Brown | Non-album single | Songwriter & Producer |
| Cliche | 2017 | Velous | Non-album single | Songwriter & Producer |
| Nasa | 2018 | Future, French Montana | Non-album single | Producer |
| Drop down | 2018 | Velous | Non-album single | Songwriter & Producer |
| Juiced Up | 2018 | Velous, Nav | Non-album single | Songwriter |
| Code | 2018 | Tru Life, TI, Yo Gotti, Velous | Walking on Water | Songwriter & Producer |
| Naked | 2018 | Tru Life, Tory Lanez, Don Q | Walking on Water | Producer |
| Cause I can | 2018 | Tru Life, Velous | Walking on Water | Songwriter & Producer |
| Been Down | 2018 | Tru Life, Velous | Walking on Water | Songwriter & Producer |
| Baddie | 2018 | Tru Life, Future | Walking on Water | Producer |
| Bag for It | 2018 | Tru Life, Rick Ross, Velous | Walking on Water | Songwriter & Producer |
| No Guidance | 2019 | Chris Brown, Drake | Indigo | Songwriter |
| A Muse | 2020 | Dvsn | A Muse In Her Feelings | Songwriter |
| Outlandish | 2020 | Dvsn | A Muse In Her Feelings | Songwriter |
| Flawless (Do it Well Pt.3) | 2020 | Dvsn, Summer Walker | A Muse In Her Feelings | Songwriter |
| Outta Time | 2020 | Bryson Tiller, Drake | Anniversary | Songwriter |
| Selfish | 2021 | Ryan Trey | A 64 East Sage | Songwriter |
| It's About A Girl | 2021 | Ryan Trey | A 64 East Sage | Songwriter |
| Change of Plans | 2021 | Ryan Trey | A 64 East Sage | Songwriter |
| El Sol Va a Salir | 2022 | Eladio Carrion | Non-album single | Producer |
| Unholy Matrimony | 2022 | Giveon | Give or Take | Songwriter |
| Outside | 2022 | Bryson Tiller | Single | Songwriter |
| Rich Boy | 2024 | Bryson Tiller | Bryson Tiller | Songwriter |
| Ciao! | 2024 | Bryson Tiller | Bryson Tiller | Songwriter |
| Peace Interlude | 2024 | Bryson Tiller | Bryson Tiller | Songwriter |
| Flames | 2024 | Nash B, Jacquees | Non-album single | Songwriter |
| 305 | 2025 | Jordan Adetunji, Bryson TIller | A Jaguar's Dream | Songwriter |
| On My way | 2025 | Bryson Tiller | Solace & The Vices | Producer |
| Dead | 2025 | Cardi B, Summer Walker | Am I The Drama | Songwriter |
| Best One | 2026 | Keyvitup | 1st EP Album | Songwriter |
| Him | 2026 | Sheff G | Non-album single | Producer |
