= Aaron Bow =

American record producer (born 1992)

- Born: Aaron Kendric Booe; December 23, 1992 (age 33); Knob Noster, Missouri, U.S.
- Occupations: Record producer; songwriter
- Years active: 2012–present

Aaron Kendric Booe (born December 23, 1992), known professionally as Aaron Bow, is an American record producer and songwriter. He has produced for artists including Travis Scott, Post Malone, Kendrick Lamar, Doja Cat, Lil Yachty, 6lack, Roddy Ricch, Gucci Mane, Bryson Tiller, among others.

== Early life ==
Aaron Bow grew up in Missouri, while spending summers at his grandmother's house in North Carolina. Intent on playing in a band, he began to teach himself guitar at the age of 12. A few years later, in high school, his attention shifted to making beats in FL Studio. Bow honed his craft by collaborating with local producers and artists, while simultaneously sending his work to artists online. His genre-less sound is inspired by eclectic influences including Phil Collins, Gucci Mane, Pharrell, and Lex Luger.

In 2012, he secured his first major placement with the track "Throwin Racks" by Yung Dred, featuring Gucci Mane. In 2014, Bow scored a short film about the world's first paraplegic motocross rider entitled 117: The Darius Glover Story, which premiered at the New Orleans Film Festival. In 2016, Bow scored a feature film exploring Philadelphia's underground dirt bike community entitled The Last Ride: A Philadelphia Story.

== Career ==
In 2017, Bow collaborated with Teddy Walton to co-produce "Crushed Glass" by Freddie Gibbs and "Pacific Ocean" by Young Dolph.

In 2018, Bow co-produced "Redemption" by Zacari and Babes Wodumo. The track was featured on Kendrick Lamar's Black Panther: The Album, which became platinum certified in May 2018 and was nominated for Album of the Year at 61st Annual Grammy Awards. Bow and Walton also co-produced "ES Tales" by Jay Rock and "Pop Another" by Maxo Kream.

In 2019, Bow co-produced "Celebrate" by DJ Khaled, featuring Travis Scott and Post Malone. The track peaked at No. 52 on the Billboard Hot 100. "Celebrate" was featured on DJ Khaled's project Father of Asahd, which hit No. 2 on the Billboard 200 album and #1 on the Billboard Hip-Hop/R&B Chart. Bow also co-produced Bryson Tiller's single "Blame" alongside Teddy Walton and J-Louis.

In 2020, Bow co-produced "Franchise" by Travis Scott. Bow later co-produced two tracks off Big Sean's album Detroit 2: "Don Life" featuring Lil Wayne, and "Everything That's Missing" featuring Dwele. That same year, Bow worked on the original score for Your Attention Please, a Hulu short series hosted by Craig Robinson celebrating inspiring black voices “who are part of the next generation of excellence". Bow also co-produced the track "Dive" from Kid Cudi's Man on the Moon III: The Chosen.

In 2021, Bow co-produced "Been Like This" from Doja Cat's album Planet Her. The production earned him his first Grammy nomination.

== Discography ==
Production and songwriting
Title	Artist(s)
2024
"Floodgate"	Nelly Furtado
2021
"Been Like This"	Doja Cat
2020
"Dive"	Kid Cudi
"Everything That's Missing"	Big Sean, Dwele
"Don Life"	Big Sean, Lil Wayne
"Franchise"	Travis Scott
2019
"Celebrate"	DJ Khaled, Travis Scott, Post Malone
"Blame"	Bryson Tiller
"Gentleman (Remix)"	Gallant, T-Pain
2018
"Redemption"	Kendrick Lamar, Zacari, Babes Wodumo
"ES Tales"	Jay Rock
"Gentleman"	Gallant
"Pop Another"	Maxo Kream
2017
"Crushed Glass"	Freddie Gibbs
"Pacific Ocean"	Young Dolph

Instrumental
Title	Artist(s)
2019
"Young & Invincible"	Zacari, Lil Yachty

Composition
Title	Project
2020
Your Attention Please	Short series
2016
The Last Ride: A Philadelphia Story	Feature film
2014
117: The Darius Glover Story	Short film
