= Teddy Walton =

American record producer and songwriter from Tennessee

Background information
- Also known as: Teddy Walton
- Born: Travis Darelle Walton; July 31, 1992 (age 33); Memphis, Tennessee, U.S.
- Genres: Hip hop; R&B; soul; pop
- Occupations: Record producer; songwriter; disc jockey
- Years active: 2006–present
- Website: trapwalton.com

Travis Darelle "Teddy" Walton (born July 30, 1992, in Memphis, Tennessee) is an American record producer, songwriter and DJ. He began music production by creating songs with his older brother, June, which gained traction on SoundCloud. Walton has received two Grammy Awards.

== Early life ==
Walton was born in Memphis, Tennessee and attended early years of high school in Columbia, Missouri, soon beginning production and composition of music in FL Studio after he downloaded the music-producing software mistakenly thinking it was a video game. He refined his sound by creating projects with his brother, rapper June. Walton self-describes his sound as a fusion of influences from Three 6 Mafia, Tame Impala and SWV–a soulful and psychedelic blend he calls "urban epic".

In 2012, Walton and June released their first project, EVOL, which gained traction online and attracted the attention of ASAP Yams. In 2013, June and Walton followed up the project with the single "Big Pimpin" with Big K.R.I.T. In 2014, they released Living Colour: Chapter 1, followed by XXX - EP in 2015.

== Music career ==
In 2015, Walton's first major label placement came with a track off ASAP Rocky's second studio album At. Long. Last. ASAP, "Electric Body" featuring Schoolboy Q. The track was certified gold in the US and peaked at number 80 on the US Billboard Hot 100 chart.

In 2017, Walton produced Kendrick Lamar's "Love" and did additional production on "God", from Lamar's fourth studio album Damn. The album debuted at number one on the US Billboard 200 and won a Grammy for Best Rap Album. "Love" is certified 4× platinum and "God" is certified gold in the US. That same year, Walton produced GoldLink's "Crew", which became 3× platinum. Walton also produced Young Dolph's "Pacific Ocean" and four tracks off of Bryson Tiller's True to Self.

In 2018, Walton produced "King's Dead" and "Redemption" off of Kendrick Lamar's Black Panther: The Album. At the 61st Annual Grammys, "King's Dead" was nominated for Rap Song of The Year and won Lamar Rap Performance of The Year. "King's Dead" also became 3× platinum in the US. In the same year, Walton also produced Post Malone's "Spoil My Night" and Jay Rock's "ES Tales".

In 2019, Walton produced "No Guidance" by Chris Brown, with Drake, which became certified platinum in August 2019, less than 10 weeks after its release. The song was nominated for Best R&B song at the 62nd Annual Grammy Awards. It was later certified 5× platinum. That same year, Walton also produced DJ Khaled's "Celebrate", with Post Malone and Travis Scott.

In 2020, Walton was the lead composer for the original score for YOUR ATTENTION PLEASE, a Hulu short-series hosted by Craig Robinson focussed on Black voices. He also co-produced four tracks of Big Sean's Detroit 2 including "Wolves" with Post Malone and "Don Life" with Lil Wayne. That same year, Walton contributed additional production to "Wash Us in the Blood" by Kanye West, featuring Travis Scott. On his birthday, July 30, Walton premiered "No Love" with Young Dolph. It is the first single off his forthcoming album Mental Health. In September 2020, he produced "Franchise" for Travis Scott, Young Thug, and M.I.A., which debuted at #1 on the Billboard Top 100. Walton also produced on "Dive" by Kid Cudi and "Next To You" by Bryson Tiller.

== Discography ==
Production and songwriting credits
Title	Artist(s)
2012
"EVOL"	June
"City Love"	June
"Run The Town"	June
"We On"	June, Rockie Fresh
"Life"	June
"Beautiful"	June, WindoView, Scolla
"One Day"	June, Skewby
"G-Shit"	June, Aer
2014
"Living Color"	June
"Like Me"	June
"Down Low"	June
"Big Pimpin'"	June, Big K.R.I.T.
"44's"	June
"Private Affair"	June
"Trap Life"	June
"Make It Work"	June
"One Time"	June
"Gutta"	June
2015
"Playa$club"	June
"Switchin' Lanes"	June
"Playa"	June
"Made It"	June
"44's"	June
"Roc Boy"	June
"Electric Body"	A$AP Rocky, ScHoolboy Q
2017
"Crew"	Goldlink, Shy Glizzy, Brent Faiyaz
"LOVE"	Kendrick Lamar, Zacari
"Rain On Me (Intro)"	Bryson Tiller
"In Check"	Bryson Tiller
"Rain Interlude"	Bryson Tiller
"Set It Off"	Bryson Tiller
"Pacific Ocean"	Young Dolph
"GOD."	Kendrick Lamar
2018
"King's Dead"	Kendrick Lamar, Jay Rock, Future, James Blake
"Redemption"	Kendrick Lamar, Zacari, Babes Wodumo
"Big Glock"	Key Glock
"No Cap"	Key Glock
"Pop Another"	Maxo Kream
"Keyz 2 the City 2"	Nipsey Hussle, TeeFlii
"Double Up"	Nipsey Hussle, Belly, Dom Kennedy
"ES Tales"	Jay Rock
"Spoil My Night"	Post Malone, Swae Lee
2019
"Celebrate"	DJ Khaled, Travis Scott, Post Malone
"No Guidance"	Chris Brown, Drake
"Nunya"	Kehlani, Dom Kennedy
"Blame"	Bryson Tiller
2020
"Wash Us in the Blood"	Kanye West, Travis Scott
"Lucky Me"	Big Sean
"Wolves"	Big Sean, Post Malone
"Harder Than My Demons"	Big Sean
"Everything That's Missing"	Big Sean, Dwele
"ZTFO"	Big Sean
"Feed"	Big Sean
"Don Life"	Big Sean, Lil Wayne
"No Love"	Teddy Walton, Young Dolph
"Infamy"	Che Ecru
"Franchise"	Travis Scott, M.I.A., Young Thug
"Franchise - Remix"	Travis Scott, M.I.A., Young Thug, Future
"Dive"	Kid Cudi
"Next To You"	Bryson Tiller
2021
"Remote Control"	Kanye West, Young Thug
"Losing Focus"	Bryson Tiller
2022
"Candy"	Che Ecru
"Gotta Move On"	P Diddy, Bryson Tiller
"Aston Martin Truck"	Roddy Ricch
"Twin"	Roddy Ricch
2023
"2 For 1"	Key Glock
"Talk"	6lack
"Holster"	Lil Yachty
"God's Wheel"	Project Pat, Teddy Walton
"FAN"	Offset
2024
"Floodgate"	Nelly Furtado
