= Bryson Tiller discography =

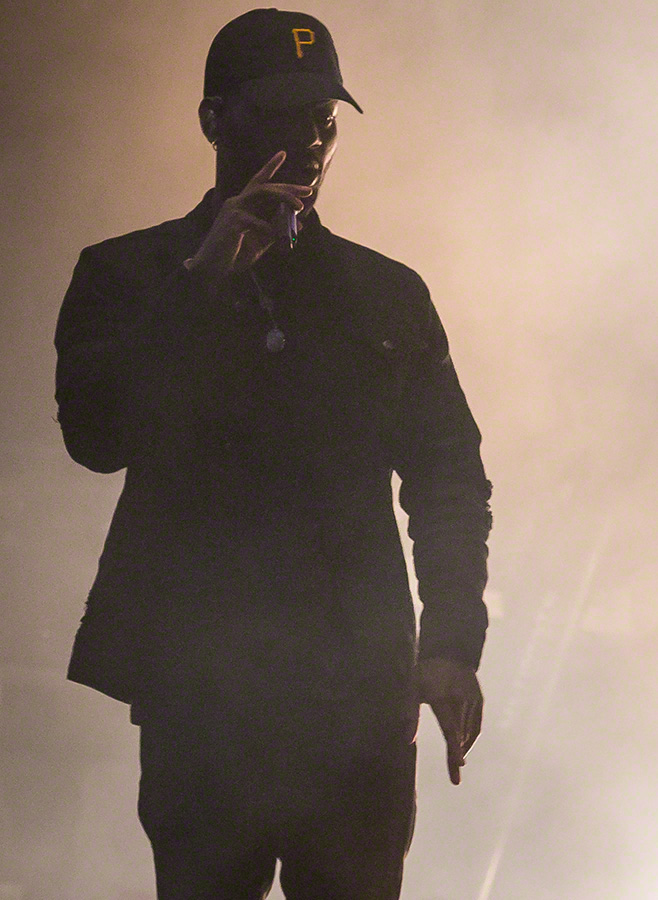
- Tiller performing at the Stavernfestivalen in July 2016
- Studio albums: 5
- EPs: 1
- Singles: 23
- Music videos: 12
- Mixtapes: 5

The discography of American singer Bryson Tiller consists of five studio albums, five mixtapes, one extended play, 23 singles and 12 music videos. He started his career in 2011, releasing the mixtape Killer Instinct Vol.1. In October 2015, Tiller released his debut studio album, Trapsoul, which reached number eight on the US Billboard 200. Two of the album's singles, "Don't" and "Exchange", have peaked in the top 40 of the US Billboard Hot 100. Tiller's second studio album, True to Self, was released on May 26, 2017, and peaked at number one on the US Billboard 200, becoming his first number-one album in the country.

== Albums ==
=== Studio albums ===
List of studio albums, with selected chart positions and sales figures
Title	Details	Peak chart positions										Sales	Certifications
Title	Details	US	US R&B /HH	US R&B	AUS	CAN	DEN	IRE	NZ	SWI	UK	Sales	Certifications
Trapsoul	Released: October 2, 2015; Label: RCA; Formats: CD, LP, digital download	8	2	2	—	29	—	—	—	62	41	US: 441,000	RIAA: 5× Platinum; BPI: Platinum; IFPI DEN: Platinum; MC: Platinum; RMNZ: 3× Platinum
True to Self	Released: May 26, 2017; Label: RCA; Formats: CD, LP, digital download	1	1	1	12	4	30	—	12	99	11	US: 507,000 (Note: United States album-equivalent units figure for True to Self as of August 2018.)	RIAA: Platinum; BPI: Silver; MC: Gold; RMNZ: Gold
Anniversary	Released: October 2, 2020; Label: RCA; Formats: CD, LP, digital download, streaming	5	4	1	11	6	23	38	17	59	12		RIAA: Gold; BPI: Gold; RMNZ: Gold
Bryson Tiller	Released: April 5, 2024; Label: RCA, TrapSoul; Formats: digital download, streaming	12	4	2	49	21	75	—	24	64	34		RIAA: Gold
Solace & The Vices	Released: October 2, 2025; Label: RCA, TrapSoul; Formats: digital download, streaming	52	13	4	—	—	—	—	—	—	—		
"—" denotes album that did not chart or was not released

=== Mixtapes ===
List of mixtapes, with selected details
Title	Details
Killer Instinct, Vol. 1	Released: October 31, 2011; Label: Self-released; Format: Digital download
Killer Instinct 2: The Nightmare Before	Released: October 31, 2021; Label: Self-released; Format: Digital download
Slum Tiller, Volume 1	Released: August 19, 2023; Label: Self-released; Format: Digital download
Slum Tiller, Volume 2	Released: November 9, 2023; Label: Self-released; Format: Digital download
Slum Tiller, Volume 3	Released: January 23, 2024; Label: Self-released; Format: Digital download

== Extended plays ==
List of extended plays, with selected details
Title	Details	Peak chart positions		
Title	Details	US	US R&B	CAN
A Different Christmas	Released: November 19, 2021; Label: RCA; Format: Digital download, streaming	194	20	89

== Singles ==
=== As lead artist ===
List of singles as lead artist, with selected chart positions, showing year released and album name
Title	Year	Peak chart positions										Certifications	Album
Title	Year	US	US R&B /HH	US R&B	AUS	CAN	IRE	NZ	SWI	UK	WW	Certifications	Album
"Don't"	2015	13	4	2	—	52	—	—	—	71	—	RIAA: 15× Platinum (Diamond); ARIA: Platinum; BPI: 2× Platinum; MC: 8× Platinum; RMNZ: 6× Platinum	Trapsoul
"Exchange"	2016	26	8	4	—	75	—	—	—	196	—	RIAA: 13× Platinum (Diamond); ARIA: Platinum; BPI: 2× Platinum; MC: 6× Platinum; RMNZ: 5× Platinum	Trapsoul
"Sorry Not Sorry"	2016	67	24	9	—	—	—	—	—	—	—	RIAA: 3× Platinum; BPI: Silver; MC: Platinum; RMNZ: Gold	Trapsoul
"Let Me Explain"	2016	— (Note: "Let Me Explain" did not enter the Billboard Hot 100, but peaked at number eighteen on the Bubbling Under Hot 100 Singles chart.)	— (Note: "Let Me Explain" did not enter the Hot R&B/Hip-Hop Songs chart, but peaked at number three on the Bubbling Under R&B/Hip-Hop Singles chart.)	14	—	—	—	—	—	—	—	RIAA: Platinum; RMNZ: Gold	Non-album singles
"Get Mine" (featuring Young Thug)	2017	— (Note: "Get Mine" did not enter the Billboard Hot 100, but peaked at number nine on the Bubbling Under Hot 100 Singles chart.)	50	17	—	—	—	—	—	—	—		Non-album singles
"Somethin Tells Me"	2017	74	41	13	—	84	—	— (Note: "Somethin Tells Me" did not enter the NZ Top 40 Singles Chart, but peaked at number eight on the NZ Heatseeker Singles Chart.)	—	—	—	RIAA: Gold	True to Self
"Run Me Dry"	2017	91	39	11	—	62	—	—	—	70	—	RIAA: 2× Platinum; BPI: Gold; MC: Gold; RMNZ: Platinum	True to Self
"Insecure" (with Jazmine Sullivan)	2017	—	—	21	—	—	—	—	—	—	—	RIAA: 2x Platinum; MC: Gold	Insecure (OST)
"Keep in Touch" (with Tory Lanez)	2018	—	—	—	—	—	—	—	—	—	—		Love Me Now?
"Canceled"	2018	—	—	—	—	—	—	—	—	—	—	RIAA: Platinum	Non-album singles
"Blame"	2019	— (Note: "Blame" did not enter the Billboard Hot 100, but peaked at number 13 on the Bubbling Under Hot 100 chart.)	—	—	—	—	—	—	—	—	—	RIAA: Platinum; RMNZ: Gold	Non-album singles
"Inhale"	2020	— (Note: "Inhale" did not enter the Billboard Hot 100, but peaked at number 5 on the Bubbling Under Hot 100 Singles chart.)	—	8	—	—	—	—	—	—	172	RIAA: Platinum	Anniversary
"Always Forever"	2020	83	33	4	—	91	—	—	—	66	113	RIAA: Gold; MC: Gold	Anniversary
"Outta Time" (featuring Drake)	2020	48	22	3	60	31	68	— (Note: "Outta Time" did not enter the NZ Top 40 Singles Chart, but peaked at number 6 on the NZ Hot Singles Chart.)	77	24	41	RIAA: Platinum; BPI: Silver; MC: Platinum; RMNZ: Gold	Anniversary
"Lonely Christmas" (featuring Justin Bieber and Poo Bear)	2021	—	—	—	—	—	—	—	—	—	—		A Different Christmas
"What Would You Do?" (with Joel Corry and David Guetta)	2022	—	—	—	—	—	32	—	—	21	—	BPI: Gold	Another Friday Night
"Outside"	2022	—	—	16	—	—	—	—	—	—	—	RIAA: Gold; MC: Gold	Bryson Tiller
"Down Like That"	2023	—	—	—	—	—	—	—	—	—	—		Non-album single
"Whatever She Wants"	2024	19	8	—	31	20	34	26	100	16	29	RIAA: 3× Platinum; ARIA: Gold; BPI: Gold; MC: 2× Platinum; RMNZ: Platinum	Bryson Tiller
"Calypso"	2024	—	—	10	—	—	—	—	—	—	—		Bryson Tiller
"I Need Her"	2025	—	35	7	—	—	—	— (Note: "I Need Her" did not enter the NZ Top 40 Singles Chart, but peaked at number 31 on the NZ Hot Singles Chart.)	—	—	—		Solace & the Vices
"It's OK"	2026	—	47	17	—	—	—	— (Note: "It's OK" did not enter the NZ Top 40 Singles Chart, but peaked at number 37 on the NZ Hot Singles Chart.)	—	—	—		Non-album singles
"Drop the Lo"	2026	— (Note: "Drop the Lo" did not enter the Billboard Hot 100, but peaked at number 18 on the Bubbling Under Hot 100 chart.)	46	16	—	—	—	— (Note: "Drop the Lo" did not enter the NZ Top 40 Singles Chart, but peaked at number 17 on the NZ Hot Singles Chart.)	—	—	—		Non-album singles
"—" denotes a recording that did not chart or was not released in that territory.

=== As featured artist ===
List of singles as featured artist, with selected chart positions, showing year released and album name
Title	Year	Peak chart positions										Certifications	Album
Title	Year	US	US R&B /HH	US R&B	AUS	CAN	IRE	NZ	SWI	UK	WW	Certifications	Album
"Lime Light" (Tyrant featuring Bryson Tiller)	2015	—	—	—	—	—	—	—	—	—	—		Non-album single
"Change Up" (Lil Lonnie featuring Bryson Tiller)	2016	—	—	—	—	—	—	—	—	—	—		TKWGO 2
"Drove U Crazy" (Gucci Mane featuring Bryson Tiller)	2016	— (Note: "Drove U Crazy" did not enter the Billboard Hot 100, but peaked at number 19 on the Bubbling Under Hot 100 Singles chart.)	— (Note: "Drove U Crazy" did not enter the Hot R&B/Hip-Hop Songs chart, but peaked at number four on the Bubbling Under R&B/Hip-Hop Singles chart.)	—	—	—	—	—	—	—	—		The Return of East Atlanta Santa
"Wild Thoughts" (DJ Khaled featuring Rihanna and Bryson Tiller)	2017	2	1	1	2	2	3	2	3	1	—	RIAA: 9× Platinum; ARIA: 7× Platinum; BEA: Platinum; BPI: 4× Platinum; GLF: 3× Platinum; IFPI DEN: 2× Platinum; MC: 5× Platinum; RMNZ: 6× Platinum; SNEP: Diamond	Grateful
"Could've Been" (H.E.R. featuring Bryson Tiller)	2018	76	39	6	—	—	—	— (Note: "Could've Been" did not enter the NZ Top 40 Singles Chart, but peaked at number 31 on the New Zealand Hot Singles chart.)	—	—	—	RIAA: 2× Platinum; BPI: Gold; MC: Gold; RMNZ: 2× Platinum	I Used to Know Her
"Nowhere to Run" (Ryan Trey featuring Bryson Tiller)	2019	—	—	—	—	—	—	—	—	—	—		Non-album single
"Playing Games" (Summer Walker featuring Bryson Tiller)	2019	—	—	—	—	—	—	— (Note: "Playing Games" did not enter the NZ Top 40 Singles Chart, but peaked at number 15 on the New Zealand Hot Singles chart.)	—	—	—		Over it
"Thru the Night" (Jack Harlow featuring Bryson Tiller)	2019	—	—	—	—	—	—	—	—	—	—	RIAA: Platinum; MC: Gold; RMNZ: Gold	Confetti
"Love... (Her Fault)" (Wale featuring Bryson Tiller)	2020	— (Note: "Love... (Her Fault)" did not enter the Billboard Hot 100, but peaked at number 25 on the Bubbling Under Hot 100 Singles chart.)	—	—	—	—	—	—	—	—	—	RIAA: Gold	Wow... That's Crazy
"Body in Motion" (DJ Khaled featuring Bryson Tiller, Lil Baby, and Roddy Ricch)	2021	79	33	8	—	66	—	— (Note: "Body in Motion" did not enter the NZ Top 40 Singles Chart, but peaked at number 16 on the New Zealand Hot Singles chart.)	—	—	96	RIAA: Gold	Khaled Khaled
"Gotta Move On" (Diddy featuring Bryson Tiller)	2022	79	—	7	—	—	—	—	—	—	—		Non-album single
"You" (Lola Brooke featuring Bryson Tiller)	2023	—	—	—	—	—	—	— (Note: "You" did not enter the NZ Top 40 Singles Chart, but peaked at number 30 on the New Zealand Hot Singles chart.)	—	—	—	RIAA: Gold	Dennis Daughter
"Never Lose Me" (Flo Milli featuring Bryson Tiller)	2023	—	—	—	—	—	—	—	—	—	—		Non-album single
"Wait on It" (Jeremih featuring Bryson Tiller and Chris Brown)	2024	—	48	—	—	—	—	— (Note: "Wait on It" did not enter the NZ Top 40 Singles Chart, but peaked at number 4 on the NZ Hot Singles Chart.)	—	—	—		TBA
"We Might Even Be Falling In Love" (Victoria Monét (Duet; with Bryson Tiller)	2024	—	—	—	—	—	—	—	—	—	—	MC: Gold	Jaguar II : Deluxe
"It Depends" (Chris Brown featuring Bryson Tiller)	2025	16	3	3	—	86	—	39	—	51	77	RIAA: Gold; RMNZ: Gold	Brown
"WYD" (Plaqueboymax featuring Bryson Tiller)	2026	—	—	—	—	—	—	—	—	—	—		Non-album single
"Face Card" (Skilla Baby featuring Chris Brown and Bryson Tiller)	2026	— (Note: "Face Card" did not enter the Billboard Hot 100, but peaked at number 1 on the Bubbling Under Hot 100 chart, which acts as an extension to the Hot 100.)	25	—	—	—	—	— (Note: "Face Card" did not enter the NZ Top 40 Singles Chart, but peaked at number 28 on the NZ Hot Singles Chart.)	—	—	—		The Price of Fame
"—" denotes a recording that did not chart or was not released in that territory.

== Other charted and certified songs ==
List of songs, with selected chart positions, showing year released and album name
Title	Year	Peak chart positions							Certifications	Album
Title	Year	US	US R&B /HH	US R&B	CAN	NZ Hot	UK	WW	Certifications	Album
"Intro (Difference)"	2015	—	—	—	—	—	—	—	RIAA: Gold	Trapsoul
"Let 'Em Know"	2015	— (Note: "Let 'Em Know" did not enter the Billboard Hot 100, but peaked at number twenty on the Bubbling Under Hot 100 Singles chart, which acts as an extension to the Hot 100.)	42	12	—	—	—	—	RIAA: 3× Platinum; BPI: Gold; MC: 2× Platinum; RMNZ: Platinum	Trapsoul
"For However Long"	2015	—	—	23	—	—	—	—	RIAA: Platinum; MC: Gold	Trapsoul
"Open Interlude"	2015	—	—	—	—	—	—	—	RIAA: Gold	Trapsoul
"Ten Nine Fourteen"	2015	—	—	—	—	—	—	—	RIAA: Gold	Trapsoul
"The Sequence"	2015	—	—	—	—	—	—	—	RIAA: Gold	Trapsoul
"Rambo"	2015	—	— (Note: "Rambo" did not enter the Hot R&B/Hip-Hop Songs chart, but peaked at number six on the Bubbling Under R&B/Hip-Hop Singles chart, which acts as an extension to the Hot R&B/Hip-Hop Songs chart.)	19	—	—	—	—	RIAA: Platinum; MC: Gold	Trapsoul
"502 Come Up"	2015	—	—	—	—	—	—	—	RIAA: Gold; MC: Gold	Trapsoul
"Been That Way"	2015	—	44	13	—	—	—	—	RIAA: 2× Platinum; MC: Platinum	Trapsoul
"Overtime"	2015	—	— (Note: "Overtime" did not enter the Hot R&B/Hip-Hop Songs chart, but peaked at number nine on the Bubbling Under R&B/Hip-Hop Singles chart, which acts as an extension to the Hot R&B/Hip-Hop Songs chart.)	21	—	—	—	—	RIAA: Platinum; MC: Gold	Trapsoul
"Right My Wrongs"	2015	—	47	15	—	—	—	—	RIAA: 6× Platinum; BPI: Platinum; MC: 3× Platinum; RMNZ: 2× Platinum	Trapsoul
"Just Another Interlude"	2015	—	—	—	—	—	—	—	RIAA: Gold	Trapsoul
"Self Righteous"	2015	—	—	—	—	—	—	—	RIAA: Gold	Trapsoul
"Ima Be Alright" (DJ Khaled featuring Bryson Tiller and Future)	2016	—	— (Note: "Ima Be Alright" did not enter the Hot R&B/Hip-Hop Songs chart, but peaked at number four on the Bubbling Under R&B/Hip-Hop Singles chart, which acts as an extension to the Hot R&B/Hip-Hop Songs chart.)	—	—	—	—	—		Major Key
"First Take" (Travis Scott featuring Bryson Tiller)	2016	—	— (Note: "First Take" did not enter the Hot R&B/Hip-Hop Songs chart, but peaked at number seven on the Bubbling Under R&B/Hip-Hop Singles chart.)	—	—	—	—	—	RIAA: Gold	Birds in the Trap Sing McKnight
"Self-Made"	2017	85	35	9	71	—	—	—	RIAA: Platinum	True to Self
"Don't Get Too High"	2017	89	38	10	99	—	—	—	RIAA: Gold	True to Self
"No Longer Friends"	2017	98	42	13	—	—	—	—	RIAA: Gold	True to Self
"We Both Know"	2017	— (Note: "We Both Know" did not enter the Billboard Hot 100, but peaked at number seven on the Bubbling Under Hot 100 Singles chart.)	49	15	—	—	—	—		True to Self
"Blowing Smoke"	2017	— (Note: "Blowing Smoke" did not enter the Billboard Hot 100, but peaked at number eight on the Bubbling Under Hot 100 Singles chart.)	50	16	—	—	—	—		True to Self
"You Got It"	2017	— (Note: "You Got It" did not enter the Billboard Hot 100, but peaked at number fourteen on the Bubbling Under Hot 100 Singles chart.)	— (Note: "You Got It" did not enter the Hot R&B/Hip-Hop Songs chart, but peaked at number one on the Bubbling Under R&B/Hip-Hop Singles chart.)	19	—	—	—	—		True to Self
"Stay Blessed"	2017	— (Note: "Stay Blessed" did not enter the Billboard Hot 100, but peaked at number twenty on the Bubbling Under Hot 100 Singles chart.)	— (Note: "Stay Blessed" did not enter the Hot R&B/Hip-Hop Songs chart, but peaked at number four on the Bubbling Under R&B/Hip-Hop Singles chart.)	22	—	—	—	—		True to Self
"In Check"	2017	— (Note: "In Check" did not enter the Billboard Hot 100, but peaked at number twenty-two on the Bubbling Under Hot 100 Singles chart.)	— (Note: "In Check" did not enter the Hot R&B/Hip-Hop Songs chart, but peaked at number five on the Bubbling Under R&B/Hip-Hop Singles chart.)	23	—	—	—	—		True to Self
"Set It Off"	2017	—	— (Note: "Set It Off" did not enter the Hot R&B/Hip-Hop Songs chart, but peaked at number eight on the Bubbling Under R&B/Hip-Hop Singles chart.)	24	—	—	—	—	RIAA: Gold	True to Self
"High Stakes"	2017	—	— (Note: "High Stakes" did not enter the Hot R&B/Hip-Hop Songs chart, but peaked at number ten on the Bubbling Under R&B/Hip-Hop Singles chart.)	25	—	—	—	—		True to Self
"Fell In Luv" (Playboi Carti featuring Bryson Tiller)	2018	—	—	—	—	—	—	—	BPI: Silver; RMNZ: Gold	Die Lit
"Years Go By"	2020	84	34	—	89	25	65	109		Anniversary
"I'm Ready for You"	2020	— (Note: "I'm Ready for You" did not enter the Billboard Hot 100, but peaked at number 3 on the Bubbling Under Hot 100 Singles chart.)	50	10	—	—	—	161		Anniversary
"Things Change"	2020	— (Note: "Things Change" did not enter the Billboard Hot 100, but peaked at number 4 on the Bubbling Under Hot 100 Singles chart.)	—	11	—	—	—	167		Anniversary
"Timeless Interlude"	2020	— (Note: "Timeless Interlude" did not enter the Billboard Hot 100, but peaked at number 8 on the Bubbling Under Hot 100 Singles chart.)	—	—	—	—	—	—		Anniversary
"Sorrows"	2020	— (Note: "Sorrows" did not enter the Billboard Hot 100, but peaked at number 2 on the Bubbling Under Hot 100 Singles chart.)	49	9	—	35	—	157	RIAA: Platinum; BPI: Silver; MC: Gold; RMNZ: Platinum	Anniversary
"Keep Doing What You're Doing"	2020	— (Note: "Keep Doing What You're Doing" did not enter the Billboard Hot 100, but peaked at number 12 on the Bubbling Under Hot 100 Singles chart.)	—	16	—	—	—	—	RIAA: Gold; MC: Gold	Anniversary
"Next to You"	2020	— (Note: "Next to You" did not enter the Billboard Hot 100, but peaked at number 6 on the Bubbling Under Hot 100 Singles chart.)	—	15	—	38	—	186	RIAA: Platinum; MC: Gold	Anniversary
"Luv Is Dro" (Jack Harlow featuring Static Major and Bryson Tiller)	2020	—	—	—	—	37	—	—	RIAA: Gold; RMNZ: Gold	Thats What They All Say
"7:00"	2021	—	—	18	—	33	—	—		Anniversary (Deluxe)
"Still Yours" (featuring Big Sean)	2021	—	—	—	—	36	—	—		Anniversary (Deluxe)
"I Can Have It All" (DJ Khaled featuring Bryson Tiller, H.E.R., and Meek Mill)	2021	— (Note: "I Can Have It All" did not enter the Billboard Hot 100, but peaked at number 18 on the Bubbling Under Hot 100 chart, "I Can Have It All" solo version in album Back of My Mind without Meek Mill.)	—	12	—	—	—	—		Khaled Khaled
"Loyal to a Fault" (Big Sean and Hit-Boy featuring Bryson Tiller and Lil Durk)	2021	— (Note: "Loyal to a Fault" did not enter the Billboard Hot 100, but peaked at number three on the Bubbling Under Hot 100 chart.)	46	—	—	—	—	—		What You Expect
"Need You Right Here" (Chris Brown featuring Bryson Tiller)	2022	—	—	23	—	—	—	—		Breezy
"Attention"	2024	—	—	—	—	31	—	—		Bryson Tiller
"Persuasion" (featuring Victoria Monét)	2024	—	—	—	—	38	—	—		Bryson Tiller
"Ciao!"	2024	— (Note: "Ciao!" did not enter the Billboard Hot 100, but peaked at number 17 on the Bubbling Under Hot 100 chart.)	—	9	—	21	—	—	RIAA: Gold	Bryson Tiller
"Strife"	2025	—	—	22	—	—	—	—		Solace & The Vices
"No Contest"	2025	—	—	25	—	—	—	—		Solace & The Vices
"Autumn Drive"	2025	—	—	24	—	—	—	—		Solace & The Vices
"—" denotes a recording that did not chart or was not released in that territory.

== Guest appearances ==
List of non-single guest appearances, with other performing artists, showing year released and album name
Title	Year	Other artist(s)	Album
"The Right Way"	2012	Krispy Keem	none
"I Want You"	2015	Kam Wil	none
"One Time"	2016	Frost Vegas	none
"Just Right"	2016	Rayven Justice	none
"Priorities"	2016	Sy Ari Da Kid	none
"Love You to Pieces"	2016	Fat Joe	none
"Ima Be Alright"	2016	DJ Khaled, Future	Major Key
"First Take"	2016	Travis Scott	Birds in the Trap Sing McKnight
"Keep You in Mind"	2016	Chris Brown	none
"Drove U Crazy"	2016	Gucci Mane	The Return of East Atlanta Santa
"Cake"	2017	WunTayk Timmy	none
"Fell in Luv"	2018	Playboi Carti	Die Lit
"Cold Blooded Creatures"	2018	AlunaGeorge	Champagne Eyes
"Smile"	2019	DJ Snake	Carte Blanche
"Love... (Her Fault)"	2019	Wale	Wow... That's Crazy
"Playing Games"	2019	Summer Walker	Over It
"Stay Down"	2019	The Game	Born 2 Rap
"Hands on You"	2019	Fat Joe, Jeremih	Family Ties
"Future Bright"	2020	Rick Ross	Bad Boys for Life: The Soundtrack
"The Sun"	2020	Kyle, Raphael Saadiq	See You When I Am Famous
"Luv Is Dro"	2020	Jack Harlow, Static Major	Thats What They All Say
"I Can Have It All"	2021	DJ Khaled, H.E.R., Meek Mill	Khaled Khaled and Back of My Mind
"Loyal to a Fault"	2021	Big Sean, Hit-Boy, Lil Durk	What You Expect
"Need You Right Here"	2022	Chris Brown	Breezy
"Reset"	2022	Nav	Demons Protected by Angels
"Sabotage"	2022	EST Gee	I Never Felt Nun
"Flowers"	2023	Trippie Redd	A Love Letter to You 5
"Fake Friends"	2024	French Montana	Mac & Cheese 5
"Run Away"	2024	Chris Brown	11:11 (Deluxe)
"This N That"	2024	Big Sean, Kodak Black	Better Me Than You

== Music videos ==
=== As lead artist ===
List of music videos as lead artist, showing year released and directors
Title	Year	Director(s)
"Don't"	2015	Cris
"Sorry Not Sorry"	2015	David M. Helman
"Exchange"	2016	Rohan Blair-Mangat
"Somethin Tells Me"	2017	Elijah Steen
"Run Me Dry"	2017	Hamish Stephenson
"Insecure" (with Jazmine Sullivan)	2017	none
"Self-Made"	2017	Collin Tilley
"Inhale"	2020	Ro. Lexx
"Right My Wrongs"	2020	Rohan Blair-Mangat
"Always Forever"	2020	Kid. Studio
"Sorrows"	2021	Kid. Studio
"Like Clockwork"	2021	Christian Sutton

=== As featured artist ===
List of music videos as featured artist, showing year released and directors
Title	Year	Director(s)
"The Right Way" (Krispy Keem featuring Bryson Tiller)	2013	none
"Wild Thoughts" (DJ Khaled featuring Rihanna and Bryson Tiller)	2017	Colin Tilley
"Could've Been" (H.E.R. featuring Bryson Tiller)	2018	Lacey Duke
"Nowhere To Run" (Ryan Trey featuring Bryson Tiller)	2019	Kid. Studio
"Thru the Night" (Jack Harlow featuring Bryson Tiller)	2019	Ace Pro & Nemo Achida
"Playing Games" (Summer Walker featuring Bryson Tiller)	2019	Christine Yuan
"Love... (Her Fault)" (Wale featuring Bryson Tiller)	2020	Spike Tey
"Hands on You" (Fat Joe and Dre featuring Jeremih and Bryson Tiller)	2020	Irv Gotti
"Playing Games" (Summer Walker featuring Bryson Tiller)		Christine Yuan
"Love... (Her Fault)" (Wale featuring Bryson Tiller)	2020	Spike Tey
"Wyd" (Plaqueboymax featuring Bryson Tiller)	2026	Moshpxt

== Songwriting credits ==
The following list shows Tiller's songwriting credits for other acts. He is also the co-writer of all of his albums' songs.

Year	Title	Artist	Album	Notes
2015	"Proof"	Chris Brown	Royalty	Co-writer
