= List of awards and nominations received by Bryson Tiller =

Bryson Tiller awards and nominations
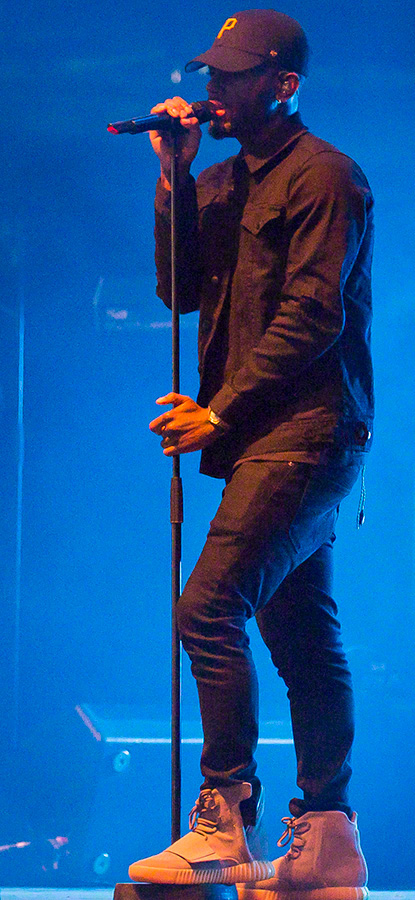
- Tiller performing in July 2016
Awards and nominations
| Award | Wins | Nominations |
| American Music Awards | 0 | 5 |
| BET | 4 | 8 |
| Billboard | 0 | 3 |
| Grammy | 0 | 5 |
| MTV VMA | 0 | 6 |
| iHeartRadio Music Awards | 2 | 7 |
| Soul Train Awards | 1 | 11 |

Totals (Note: Certain award groups do not simply award one winner. They acknowledge several different recipients, have runners-up, and have third place. Since this is a specific recognition and is different from losing an award, runner-up mentions are considered wins in this award tally. For simplification and to avoid errors, each award in this list has been presumed to have had a prior nomination.)
- Wins: 7
- Nominations: 43

This is a list of awards and nominations received by American singer-songwriter Bryson Tiller. Three time Grammy Awards-nominated artist, Tiller signed a record deal with RCA Records in 2015 and released his debut studio album T R A P S O U L. In 2016, he received the award Best New Artist at the BET Awards, and was also nomination for the same award at the Billboard Music Awards, BET Hip Hop Awards, MTV Video Music Awards and Soul Train Music Awards. The lead single "Exchange" was nominated for Best R&B Song at the 59th annual ceremony.

In 2017, he collaborated with Rihanna on DJ Khaled's single "Wild Thoughts". The collaboration won a BET Awards, a Soul Train Music Awards and a iHeartRadio Music Awards. In 2018 Tiller duet with Jazmine Sullivan on "Insecure", being nominated at the NAACP Image Award.

In 2020 Tiller duet with H.E.R on "Could've Been", earning nominations at the MTV Video Music Awards and his second Grammy Awards nomination. The song was included in H.E.R. debut studio album, Back of My Mind, which was nominated for Album of the Year at the 64th Grammy Awards, becoming Tiller's third nomination.

In 2026 the collaboration "It Depends" with Chris Brown received two nominations at the 68th Annual Grammy Awards and won two NAACP Image Awards.

== American Music Awards ==
The American Music Awards is an annual awards ceremony created by Dick Clark in 1973.

| Year | Category | Nominated work | Result |
|---|---|---|---|
| 2016 | Favorite Soul/R&B Album | T R A P S O U L | Nominated |
| 2016 | Favorite Soul/R&B Song | "Don't" | Nominated |
| 2016 | Favorite Soul/R&B Male Artist | —N/a | Nominated |
| 2025 | Favourite R&B Male Artist | Himself | Nominated |
| 2025 | Favourite R&B Album | Bryson Tiller | Nominated |

== BET ==
=== BET Awards ===
The BET Awards were established in 2001 by the Black Entertainment Television (BET) network to celebrate African Americans and other minorities in music, acting, sports, and other fields of entertainment.

| Year | Category | Nominated work | Result |
|---|---|---|---|
| 2016 | Best Male R&B/Pop Artist | — | Won |
| 2016 | Best New Artist | — | Won |
| 2016 | Video of the Year | "Don't" | Nominated |
| 2016 | Coca-Cola Viewers' Choice | "Don't" | Nominated |
| 2018 | Best Collaboration | "Wild Thoughts" (with DJ Khaled and Rihanna) | Won |
| 2019 | Best Collaboration | "Could've Been" (with H.E.R.) | Nominated |
| 2024 | Best Male R&B/Pop Artist | — | Nominated |

=== BET Hip Hop Awards ===
The BET Hip Hop Awards are hosted annually by BET for hip hop performers, producers, and music video directors.

| Year | Category | Nominated work | Result |
|---|---|---|---|
| 2016 | Best New Hip Hop Artist | — | Nominated |
| 2017 | Best Hip Hop Video | "Wild Thoughts" (with DJ Khaled and Rihanna) | Nominated |
| 2017 | Best Collabo, Duo or Group | "Wild Thoughts" (with DJ Khaled and Rihanna) | Won |

== Billboard Music Awards ==
The Billboard Music Awards are held to honor artists for commercial performance in the U.S., based on record charts published by Billboard magazine.

| Year | Category | Nominated work | Result |
|---|---|---|---|
| 2016 | Top New Artist | — | Nominated |
| 2016 | Top R&B Artist | — | Nominated |
| 2016 | Top R&B Album | T R A P S O U L | Nominated |
| 2018 | Top R&B Song | "Wild Thoughts" (with DJ Khaled and Rihanna) | Nominated |

== BMI ==
The BMI Awards are annual award ceremonies for songwriters in various genres organized by Broadcast Music, Inc., honoring songwriters and publishers.

=== BMI R&B/Hip-Hop Awards ===
| Year | Category | Nominated work | Result |
|---|---|---|---|
| 2017 | Most Performed R&B/Hip-Hop Songs | "Don't" | Won |
| 2017 | Most Performed R&B/Hip-Hop Songs | "Exchange" | Won |
| 2018 | Most Performed R&B/Hip-Hop Songs | "Wild Thoughts" (with DJ Khaled and Rihanna) | Won |

=== BMI Pop Awards ===
| Year | Category | Nominated work | Result |
|---|---|---|---|
| 2018 | Award-Winning Songs | "Wild Thoughts" (with DJ Khaled and Rihanna) | Won |

== Grammy Awards ==
The Grammy Awards are awarded annually by the National Academy of Recording Arts and Sciences (NARAS).

| Year | Category | Nominated work | Result |
|---|---|---|---|
| 2017 | Best R&B Song | "Exchange" | Nominated |
| 2020 | Best R&B Performance | "Could've Been" (with H.E.R.) | Nominated |
| 2022 | Album of the Year | Back of My Mind (as featured artist) | Nominated |
| 2026 | Best R&B Song | "It Depends" (with Chris Brown) | Nominated |
| 2026 | Best R&B Performance | "It Depends" (with Chris Brown) | Nominated |

== iHeartRadio Music Awards ==
The IHeartRadio Music Awards is an international music awards show founded by IHeartRadio in 2014.

| Year | Category | Nominated work | Result |
|---|---|---|---|
| 2017 | Best New Artist | — | Nominated |
| 2017 | Best New R&B Artist | — | Won |
| 2017 | R&B Artist of the Year | — | Nominated |
| 2017 | R&B Song of the Year | "Exchange" | Nominated |
| 2018 | Song of the Year | "Wild Thoughts" (with DJ Khaled and Rihanna) | Nominated |
| 2018 | Best Collaboration | "Wild Thoughts" (with DJ Khaled and Rihanna) | Nominated |
| 2018 | Hip-Hop Song of the Year | "Wild Thoughts" (with DJ Khaled and Rihanna) | Won |

== Hollywood Music in Media Awards ==
| Year | Category | Nominated work | Result |
|---|---|---|---|
| 2023 | Best Original Song in an Animated Film | "Down Like That" | Nominated |

== Kentucky Urban Entertainment Awards ==
The Kentucky Urban Entertainment Awards honors Kentucky musicians, DJs and others in the entertainment industry.

| Year | Category | Nominated work | Result |
|---|---|---|---|
| 2016 | Static Major Award | — | Won |

== MOBO Awards ==
The MOBO Awards (an acronym for "Music of Black Origin") were established in 1996 by Kanya King. They are held annually in the United Kingdom to recognize artists of any race or nationality performing music of black origin.

| Year | Category | Nominated work | Result |
|---|---|---|---|
| 2016 | Best International Act | — | Nominated |

== MTV ==
=== MTV Video Music Awards ===
The MTV Video Music Awards was established in 1984 by MTV to award the music videos of the year.

| Year | Category | Nominated work | Result |
|---|---|---|---|
| 2016 | Best New Artist | — | Nominated |
| 2016 | Best Male Video | "Don't" | Nominated |
| 2016 | Best Hip-Hop Video | "Don't" | Nominated |
| 2017 | Video of the Year | "Wild Thoughts" (with DJ Khaled and Rihanna) | Nominated |
| 2017 | Best Collaboration | "Wild Thoughts" (with DJ Khaled and Rihanna) | Nominated |
| 2017 | Best Art Direction | "Wild Thoughts" (with DJ Khaled and Rihanna) | Nominated |
| 2019 | Best R&B Video | "Could've Been " (with H.E.R.) | Nominated |
| 2023 | Best Hip-Hop Video | "Gotta Move On" (with Diddy Feat., Ashanti, Yung Miami) | Nominated |
| 2023 | Best Collaboration | "Gotta Move On" (with Diddy Feat., Ashanti, Yung Miami) | Nominated |

=== MTV Europe Music Awards ===
The MTV Europe Music Awards was established in 1994 by MTV to award the music videos from European and international artists.

| Year | Category | Nominated work | Result |
|---|---|---|---|
| 2017 | Best Song | "Wild Thoughts" (with DJ Khaled and Rihanna) | Nominated |

=== MTV Video Music Awards Japan ===
The MTV Video Music Awards Japan were established in 2002 to celebrate the most popular music videos from Japanese and international artists.

| Year | Category | Nominated work | Result |
|---|---|---|---|
| 2016 | Best R&B Video | "Don't" | Nominated |

== NAACP Image Awards ==
The NAACP Image Awards is presented by the American National Association for the Advancement of Colored People to honor outstanding people of color in film, television, music, and literature.

| Year | Category | Nominated work | Result |
|---|---|---|---|
| 2018 | Outstanding Song, Contemporary | "Insecure" (with Jazmine Sullivan) | Nominated |
| 2019 | Outstanding Music Video | "Could've Been" (with H.E.R.) | Nominated |
| 2019 | Outstanding Duo, Group or Collaboration | "Could've Been" (with H.E.R.) | Nominated |
| 2026 | Outstanding Male Artist | Himself | Nominated |
| 2026 | Outstanding Duo, Group or Collaboration (Contemporary) | "It Depends" (with Chris Brown) | Won |
| 2026 | Outstanding Soul/R&B Song | "It Depends" (with Chris Brown) | Won |

== Soul Train Music Awards ==
The Soul Train Music Awards is an annual award show aired in national broadcast syndication that honors the best in African American music and entertainment established in 1987.

| Year | Category | Nominated work | Result |
|---|---|---|---|
| 2016 | Best New Artist | — | Nominated |
| 2016 | Best R&B/Soul Male Artist | — | Nominated |
| 2016 | Album of the Year | T R A P S O U L | Nominated |
| 2016 | Song of the Year | "Don't" | Nominated |
| 2017 | Best R&B/Soul Male Artist | — | Nominated |
| 2017 | Video of the Year | "Wild Thoughts" (with DJ Khaled and Rihanna) | Nominated |
| 2017 | Rhythm & Bars Award | "Wild Thoughts" (with DJ Khaled and Rihanna) | Nominated |
| 2017 | Song of the Year | "Wild Thoughts" (with DJ Khaled and Rihanna) | Nominated |
| 2017 | Best Dance Performance | "Wild Thoughts" (with DJ Khaled and Rihanna) | Nominated |
| 2017 | Best Collaboration | "Wild Thoughts" (with DJ Khaled and Rihanna) | Won |
| 2017 | Best Collaboration | "Insecure" (with Jazmine Sullivan) | Nominated |
| 2026 | R&B/Soul Song of The Year | ''It Depends (with Chris Brown) | Pending |
