= Bicep (disambiguation) =

A bicep or biceps is a two-headed muscle that lies on the upper arm.

Bicep or BICEP may refer to:

- Bicep (duo), a duo from Belfast, Northern Ireland
  - Bicep (album) (2017)
- BICEP and Keck Array (Background Imaging of Cosmic Extragalactic Polarization)
- Business for Innovative Climate and Energy Policy
- Bicep, a domain-specific language (DSL) that uses declarative syntax

== See also ==
- Biceps (disambiguation)
- Biceps femoris muscle, a two-part muscle of the thigh
