= 2016 Soul Train Music Awards =

Music awards ceremony in Las Vegas, US

Soul Train Music Awards
- Date: November 6, 2016
- Location: Orleans Arena, Las Vegas, Nevada
- Country: United States
- Hosted by: Erykah Badu
- Most awards: Beyoncé (4)
- Website: soultrain.com

Television/radio coverage
- Network: BET, Centric

The 2016 Soul Train Music Awards was held at the Orleans Arena in Las Vegas, Nevada, on November 6, 2016. It was later aired on Centric and BET on November 27, 2016. The ceremony, hosted by Erykah Badu for the second year in a row, honored artists in 12 different categories. Drake was the most nominated artist with twelve, followed by Beyoncé (10) and Rihanna (8). During the ceremony american singer and songwriter Brandy was honored with the Lady of Soul Award for her contributions to the music industry. Teddy Riley was recognized by the Legend Award for his successful songwriting and music producing works.

== Special awards ==
=== Legend Award ===
- Teddy Riley

=== Lady of Soul Award ===
- Brandy

== Winners and nominees ==
Winners are listed first and highlighted in bold.

=== Album of the Year ===
- **Beyoncé – Lemonade**
  - DJ Khaled – Major Key
  - Drake – Views
  - Rihanna – Anti
  - Bryson Tiller – T R A P S O U L
  - Kanye West – The Life of Pablo

=== Song of the Year ===
- **Beyoncé – "Formation"**
  - Adele – "Hello"
  - Drake – "Controlla"
  - Rihanna (featuring Drake) – "Work"
  - Bryson Tiller – "Don't"

=== Video of the Year ===
- **Beyoncé – "Formation"**
  - Beyoncé – "Sorry"
  - Drake – "Hotline Bling"
  - Rihanna (featuring Drake) – "Work"
  - Kanye West – "Fade"

=== The Ashford & Simpson Songwriter's Award ===
- **Andra Day – "Rise Up"**
  - **Written by: Andra Day and Jennifer Decilveo**
- Adele – "Hello"
  - Written by: Adele and Greg Kurstin
- Beyoncé – "Formation"
  - Written by: Michael Len Williams II, Beyoncé, Khalif Brown, Jordan Frost and Asheton Hogan
- Rihanna – "Needed Me"
  - Written by: Nick Audino, Rachel Derrus, Adam Feeney, Rihanna, Brittany Hazzard, Charles Hinshaw, Lewis Hughes, Dijon McFarlane, Khaled Rohaim, Te Whiti Warbrick
- Bryson Tiller – "Don't"
  - Written by: Johntá Austin, Mariah Carey, Bryan-Michael Cox, Jermaine Dupri, Tavoris Hollins, Jr., Isom Brandon Stewart and Bryson Tiller

=== Best R&B/Soul Male Artist ===
- **Maxwell**
  - Anthony Hamilton
  - Bryson Tiller
  - Usher
  - The Weeknd

=== Best R&B/Soul Female Artist ===
- **Beyoncé**
  - Fantasia
  - Alicia Keys
  - Rihanna
  - Jill Scott

=== Best New Artist ===
- **Chance the Rapper**
  - Andra Day
  - Ro James
  - Tory Lanez
  - Anderson .Paak
  - Bryson Tiller

=== Centric Certified Award ===
- **Anderson .Paak**
  - After 7
  - Bilal
  - Lalah Hathaway
  - Musiq Soulchild

=== Rhythm & Bars Award ===
- **Fat Joe and Remy Ma (featuring French Montana and Infared) – "All the Way Up"**
  - Chance the Rapper (featuring Lil Wayne and 2 Chainz) – "No Problem"
  - DJ Khaled (featuring Drake) – "For Free"
  - Drake – "Controlla"
  - Drake (featuring Wizkid and Kyla) – "One Dance"

=== Best Gospel/Inspirational Song ===
- **Kirk Franklin – "123 Victory"**
  - Travis Greene – "Made a Way"
  - Tamela Mann – "God Provides"
  - Donnie McClurkin – "I Need You"
  - Hezekiah Walker – "Better"

=== Best Dance Performance ===
- **Kanye West (featuring Dance Performance by Teyana Taylor) – "Fade"**
  - Beyoncé – "Formation"
  - Drake – "Hotline Bling"
  - Rihanna (featuring Drake) – "Work"
  - Usher (featuring Young Thug) – "No Limit"

=== Best Collaboration ===
- **Fat Joe and Remy Ma (featuring French Montana and Infared) – "All the Way Up"**
  - Beyoncé (featuring Kendrick Lamar) – "Freedom"
  - Chance the Rapper (featuring Lil Wayne and 2 Chainz) – "No Problem"
  - DJ Khaled (featuring Drake) – "For Free"
  - Rihanna (featuring Drake) – "Work"

=== Internet Soul Sensation Badu Award ===
- **Jay Versace**, **Karlton Humes** and **James Wright**
