= Whatever She Wants =

Whatever She Wants may refer to:

- "Whatever She Wants" (Bryson Tiller song)
- "Whatever She Wants" (Jars of Clay song)
