= Clara La San =

British singer, songwriter, and record producer

- Origin: Manchester, England
- Genres: R&B; alternative R&B
- Occupations: Singer; songwriter; record producer
- Instruments: Vocals; synthesizer
- Years active: 2014–present
- Label: AWAL

Rosemary Clare Louise Francis, known professionally as Clara La San, is a British singer, songwriter, and record producer. In 2013, her debut song "Let You Go" became popular on SoundCloud. Her follow-up song "In This Darkness" later went viral on TikTok upon being rereleased in 2022. Her debut studio album, Made Mistakes, was released in 2024.

== Career ==
La San grew up in the English countryside and learned classical piano as a child. She first began producing music using Logic Pro while attending university. Also while there, she released her first song, "Let You Go", on SoundCloud through the label Gang Fatale in 2014. It found success on the service and garnered her attention from record labels. Her song "In This Darkness" also became popular on SoundCloud. She was featured on the Scratcha DVA song "Pink22" in 2015 and on the extended play Fones by MssngNo in 2016. She released her debut mixtape, Good Mourning, in November 2017, but took it down two years later, later stating that "it didn't feel ready".

La San was featured on electronic music duo Bicep's 2020 single "Saku" and their song "X", both of which appeared on their 2021 album Isles, and on their 2022 single "Water". She rereleased "Let You Go" on streaming platforms in 2021 and "In This Darkness" in 2023, with the latter song going viral on TikTok that year. She returned as a lead artist in March 2024 with the release of her first single through CLS Music, an imprint of AWAL, "Don't Worry About It". She was featured on Bryson Tiller's song "Random Access Memory (RAM)" from his self-titled album, which was also released in March 2024. Her self-produced and self-written debut studio album, Made Mistakes, was released on 7 June 2024.

== Musical style ==
La San's music is largely alternative R&B with some describing the style as bedroom pop. She has stated that her music is inspired by "rap that has a lot of synth melodies". She records her music using her laptop and a Neumann U 87 microphone. Tobias Hess of Paper described La San's music as "an ethereal R&B that has one foot in the early 2000s and the other in a time that doesn't exist yet" and Niall Byrne of Nialler9 called it "nocturnal R&B-pop". She also became known for her enigmatic presence online.

== Discography ==
=== Studio albums ===
List of studio albums, with release date and label shown
| Title | Details |
|---|---|
| Made Mistakes | Released: 7 June 2024; Label: CLS Music; Format: LP record, digital download, streaming |

=== Mixtapes ===
List of mixtapes, with release date and label shown
| Title | Details |
|---|---|
| Good Mourning | Released: 24 November 2017; Rereleased: 13 December 2024; Label: Self-released (original release); CLS Music (rerelease); Format: Digital download, streaming |

=== Singles ===
==== As lead artist ====
List of singles as lead artist, with title, year released, and album shown
| Title | Year | Peak chart positions | | Album |
| Title | Year | UK Indie | US R&B | Album |
|---|---|---|---|---|
| "Let You Go" | 2014 | — | — | Good Mourning |
| "In This Darkness" | 2015 | — | 20 | Non-album single |
| "Feel Good" | 2017 | 42 | — | Good Mourning |
| "Gravity" | 2017 | — | — | Good Mourning |
| "Don't Worry About It" | 2024 | — | — | Made Mistakes |
| "Talking to You" | 2024 | — | — | Made Mistakes |
| "Things You Didn't Know" | 2024 | — | — | Made Mistakes |
| "Unplanned" | 2024 | — | — | Good Mourning |
| "Want You" | 2025 | — | — | |
| "News" | 2025 | — | — | |
| "Old Me" | 2025 | — | — | |
| "Love You Right" (with Montell Fish) | 2026 | — | — | |

==== As featured artist ====
List of singles as featured artist, with title, year released, and album shown
| Title | Year | Album |
|---|---|---|
| "Saku" (Bicep featuring Clara La San) | 2020 | Isles |
| "Water" (Bicep featuring Clara La San) | 2022 | Non-album single |
| "Touch Me" (Jam City featuring Clara La San & Aidan) | 2023 | Jam City Presents EFM |
| "The Moment" (The Kid LAROI featuring Clara La San) | 2026 | Before I Forget |

=== Other charted songs ===
List of other charted songs, showing year released, with selected chart positions and album name
| Title | Year | Peak chart positions | Album |
| Title | Year | US R&B | Album |
|---|---|---|---|
| "Random Access Memory (RAM)" (Bryson Tiller featuring Clara La San) | 2024 | 18 | Bryson Tiller |

=== Guest appearances ===
List of guest appearances, with year, other artist(s), and album
| Title | Year | Artist(s) | Album |
|---|---|---|---|
| "Pink22" | 2015 | Scratcha DVA | Allyallrecords |
| "All Good" | 2018 | Jam City | Earthly 000 |
| "I'll See You" | 2020 | Jonah Mutono | Gerg |
| "X" | 2021 | Bicep | Isles |
| "Telepathy Love" | 2025 | BNYX | Loading... |
