= Atlas (Bicep song) =

Single by Bicep

from the album Isles
- Released: 24 March 2020
- Genre: Breakbeat; house
- Length: 5:52
- Label: Ninja Tune
- Songwriters: Matthew McBriar; Andrew Ferguson; Bezalel Aloni
- Producer: Bicep

Bicep singles chronology
"Rain" (2018)	"Atlas" (2020)	"Apricots" (2020)

Visualiser
- "Atlas" on YouTube

"Atlas" is a song by Northern Irish electronic music duo Bicep from their second studio album, Isles (2021). It was released through independent record label Ninja Tune as the first single from the album on 24 March 2020. A 12-inch vinyl single was released on 3 April 2020. The song contains a vocal sample from Israeli singer Ofra Haza's 1988 a capella track "Love Song", written by Bezalel Aloni. "Atlas" peaked at number 91 on the UK Singles Chart and charted at number 90 in Ireland.

== Background and production ==
"Atlas" originated from a vocal sample of Israeli singer Ofra Haza's a capella track "Love Song", written by Bezalel Aloni for Haza's album, Shaday (1988). Bicep discovered Haza while searching for Italo disco records at the Stoke Newington record shop, Lucky Seven, where they bought her 1986 album, Broken Days. After exploring the singer's back catalogue, the duo were overwhelmed by the "cathartic energy" of "Love Song".

Bicep produced "Atlas" using a combination of new and 40-year old equipment. The track was recorded at the newly built studio they used after returning from tour in early 2019. The focus was to create a track that would translate memorably in a live setting, but also give them flexibility to play it differently from show to show. Multiple versions of the song were recorded with many changes made throughout the process. "It was one of those tracks that didn't come together quickly," the duo said. Bicep describe it as their attempt at summarising the euphoric experiences they had on the tour. According to them, "Atlas" achieved what they had long strived to create by introducing the storytelling element missing in their live sets. Mastered by Matt Colton at Metropolis Studios, it was the first song Bicep completed for their second album, Isles.

== Music and structure ==
"Atlas" is a breakbeat and house song, composed in the key of G-sharp minor with a tempo of 129 beats per minute. It opens with an off-kilter drum beat, 1990s ambient-style pads, and the feint, floating Haza vocal sample which forms the foundation of the song. The layers and texture of the electronics, together with the breakbeat percussion and vocals from "Love Song" create a musical juxtaposition. After slowly building, the heavily modulated hook is introduced with arpeggios in low-frequency oscillation, and a skittering, trance synth line, setting the track's moody and melancholy tone.

The double pitched synth-percussion acts as the song's melody and the beat uses a woodblock and textural ride instead of hi-hats. The drums mostly stay the same throughout, but the track builds in tension by use of subtle dynamics without detracting from the central hook. As "Atlas" progresses, sub-bass and heavy bass drums are added. The beat is electronic, although the drums sound live mainly due to the timbre of its layers. According to Gareth O'Malley of Beats Per Minute, the song contrasts escapism with introspection.

== Release ==
Bicep first teased "Atlas" during a performance at The Warehouse Project in Manchester in November 2019. The song premiered on BBC Radio 1's' Annie Mac show on 24 March 2020. It was released through independent record label Ninja Tune on digital and streaming platforms shortly thereafter as the first single from Isles. A "trippy" looped visualiser was shared on YouTube to accompany the release. The cover art for "Atlas" was designed by Degrau.

The single was initially planned to coincide with Bicep's Brixton Academy live shows later in 2020, but the release was brought forward following the postponement of the shows due the COVID-19 pandemic. On 3 April 2020, "Atlas" was released in a 12-inch vinyl format. It was also released as a bundle with a double LP of Bicep's 2017 self-titled debut album in a gatefold wallet with printed inners, a download code and one of four different cover arts (selected at random). In May 2020, the song was A-listed by British alternative music radio station BBC Radio 6 Music, and C-listed by BBC Radio 1, making it Bicep's first single to be playlisted by the latter popular music station.

== Reception ==
=== Critical response ===
"Atlas" received positive reviews from music critics. Reef Younis of Loud and Quiet wrote that Bicep creatively channeled emotions into euphoria, describing the track as "slow-burn magic". Gigwise's Sofie Lindevall highlighted the depth of layers and texture in the electronics, and said "waves of euphonic yet achingly nostalgic synths" instantly draw you in. Evening Standard critic David Smyth felt the breakbeats "kick with considerable heft", while Luke Pearson of Exclaim! found them "expertly-crafted", and praised the agility of the lead melody.

In The Guardian, Alexis Petridis likened the combination of electronics, vocals and beats to The Future Sound of London's "Papua New Guinea" and Orbital's "Halcyon". In a review for Uncut magazine, Stephen Dalton agreed with the latter comparison, noting that the "galloping breakbeat euphoria and soaring vocals recall vintage Orbital." Some reviewers compared the song to the sound of Bicep's self-titled debut album, particularly the single "Glue". A critic from The Wire magazine regarded it as a reset of the formula of the aforementioned track, while Chris Taylor of DIY cited it as the nearest relative on Isles to the 2017 song, but argued that "Atlas" had its own distinct feel. Similarly, Resident Advisor's Carlos Hawthorn, who called the track the "Glue" of Isles, said it refreshed the texture with a new energy and louder tone, deeming it "a modular earworm".

B. Sassons of PopMatters believed "Atlas" evolved Bicep's sound with maturity, hailing it as "a how-to guide on creating an expansive and highly developed piece with limited melodic material." O'Malley shared a similar view; he commented that the hook and sample provided a "bittersweet update of their established sound". On the other hand, Ben Cardew of Pitchfork wrote that although Bicep sound "miserable" on the song, it has "a wonderfully hangdog feel". "Atlas" won Best Track at the 2020 DJ Mag Best of British Awards.

=== Commercial performance ===
Upon release, the single debuted at number 33 on the UK Dance Singles Chart, and at number 90 on the Irish Singles Chart, becoming Bicep's first single to chart in Ireland. "Atlas" also entered the UK Vinyl Singles Chart at number three. Following the release of Isles in January 2021, "Atlas" re-entered the UK Dance Singles Chart at a new peak of number 25, and debuted at number 91 on the UK Singles Chart.

== Charts ==
Chart performance for "Atlas"
Chart (2020–2021)	Peak position
Ireland (IRMA)	90
UK Singles (OCC)	91
UK Dance (OCC)	25
UK Indie (OCC)	24

== Certifications ==
Certifications for "Atlas"
Region	Certification	Certified units/sales
United Kingdom (BPI)	Silver	200,000^{‡}
^{‡} Sales+streaming figures based on certification alone.
