= Trapsoul =

Studio album by Bryson Tiller
- Released: September 25, 2015
- Recorded: 2014–2015
- Genres: Alt-R&B; hip-hop soul; trap
- Length: 44:58
- Label: RCA
- Producers: J-Louis; Syk Sense; Chris King; Ayo; Bagheera Smoov; Epikh Pro; Fade MaJah; Fayo & Chill; Foreign Teck; AR; Gravez; Just Hustle; Keyz; Milli Beatz; Neil Dominique; Rob Holladay; Sango; Timbaland

Bryson Tiller chronology
Killer Instinct, Vol. 1 (2011)	Trapsoul (2015)	True to Self (2017)

Singles from Trapsoul
- 1. "Don't" Released: May 20, 2015; 2. "Exchange" Released: March 8, 2016; 3. "Sorry Not Sorry" Released: June 21, 2016

Trapsoul (stylized as T R A P S O U L) is the debut studio album by American singer-songwriter Bryson Tiller. It was released on September 25, 2015 on Apple Music, with a general release date of October 2, 2015 by RCA Records. Recording sessions took place from 2014 to 2015, with the contributions from a variety of the record producers such as J-Louis, Epikh Pro, Ayo, Bill C Da Don, Foreign Teck, Rob Holladay, Syk Sense, alongside other high-profile record producers from Sango and Timbaland, among others. The album was supported by three singles: "Don't", "Exchange" and "Sorry Not Sorry". The album garnered Tiller his breakthrough into mainstream R&B, and was certified 5× Platinum by the RIAA.

Five years after its release, a deluxe version of the album was released on September 25, 2020.

== Singles ==
In 2014, Bryson Tiller first premiered a track, "Don't" through SoundCloud, which was later released for digital download as the album's lead single on May 20, 2015. The music video for "Don't" was released on August 20, 2015. The single peaked at number 13 on the US Billboard Hot 100, becoming Tiller's highest-charting single as a lead artist, and highest overall until DJ Khaled's song "Wild Thoughts", which featured Tiller and Rihanna debuted at number four and later peaked at number two.

"Exchange" was sent to rhythmic crossover radio on March 8, 2016, as the album's second single. The music video for the track premiered on June 1, 2016. "Exchange" peaked at number 26 on the US Billboard Hot 100.

"Sorry Not Sorry" was sent to urban radio on June 21, 2016, as the third single from the album. The song's music video was released on October 14, 2015. "Sorry Not Sorry" has peaked at number 67 on the Billboard Hot 100.

== Promotion ==
On December 16, 2015, Tiller announced the dates for Trapsoul tour, which started on January 24, 2016, in Portland, Oregon. R&B duo THEY. was chosen as opening act for the tour.

== Accolades ==
Trapsoul was included in several year-end lists. PopSugar ranked the album at number 20 on their The 24 Best Albums of 2015 list, saying it's "great to listen to while hanging out at home and dreaming about your crush". The BoomBox placed the album at number six on its 20 Best R&B Albums of 2015 list, saying that it's a "great introduction" of Tiller. Oyster ranked it at number 20 on their 20 Albums We Turned Up To in 2015 list, noting "The album is equal parts feel-inducing and turnt". It was placed at number 43 on Complex magazine's The Best Albums of 2015 list, number 11 on Global Grind's The 15 Best Albums of 2015 list and number seven on The Root magazine's Our 10 Favorite Albums of 2015 list.

=== Awards and nominations ===
Year	Awards	Category	Result
2016	Billboard Music Awards	Top R&B Album	Nominated
2016	American Music Awards	Favorite Soul/R&B Album	Nominated
2016	Soul Train Music Awards	Album of the Year	Nominated

== Commercial performance ==
In the United States, Trapsoul debuted at number 11 on the US Billboard 200, selling 22,000 copies in its first week. In its 16th week on the chart, the album reached its peak at number eight on the chart, earning 33,000 album-equivalent units. On October 2, 2025, the album was certified five-times platinum by the Recording Industry Association of America (RIAA) for the combined sales and album-equivalent units of over five million units in the United States.

The album also has reached at number 16 on the UK R&B Chart.

== Deluxe version ==
On September 24, 2020, Tiller announced the release of a deluxe edition of Trapsoul, containing songs fans had requested to be officially released. It was released on September 25, and includes the tracks "Just Another Interlude" and "Self Righteous", which were released on Tiller's SoundCloud in 2015. A collaboration with The Weeknd, titled "Rambo: Last Blood", originally released on The Weeknd's SoundCloud in 2015, is also included. The two performed a remix of the song in Berlin during Tiller's Trapsoul Tour. Tiller said the songs on the deluxe edition "didn't quite make the cut" for the 2015 release. The "special" edition was released in celebration of his third album, Anniversary.

== Track listing ==
No.	Title	Writer(s)	Producer(s)	Length
1.	"Intro (Difference)"	Bryson Tiller; Robert Watson	Rob Holladay; Neil Dominique	1:31
2.	"Let Em' Know"	Tiller; Robert Kelly; Joshua Scruggs	Syk Sense	4:21
3.	"Exchange"	Tiller; Javelyn Hall; Michael Johnson; Michael Hernandez	Foreign Teck	3:14
4.	"For However Long"	Tiller; Donald Degrate; Shirley Murdock; Larry Troutman; Roger Troutman; Brian Defeo; Robert Henley; Reginald Moore	Fayo & Chill	2:04
5.	"Don't"	Tiller; Mariah Carey; Johntá Austin; Bryan-Michael Cox; Jermaine Dupri; Tavoris Hollins, Jr.; Stuart Lowery	Epikh Pro	3:18
6.	"Open Interlude"	Tiller; Eric Dunn; Alex Isley; Austin Owens; James Foye III; Ian Thomas	Bagheera Smoov; Ayo; Keyz; Just Hustle	2:41
7.	"Ten Nine Fourteen"	Tiller; Keith Sweat; Fitzgerald Scott; Scruggs	Syk Sense	3:10
8.	"The Sequence"	Tiller; Marc Gay; Kai Wright; Carl Martin	Sango; Chris Born	3:14
9.	"Rambo"	Tiller; Scruggs; Chris Owens; Veniamin Basner	Syk Sense; Chris King	3:43
10.	"502 Come Up"	Tiller; Joshua Louis Huizar; Christopher Justice	J-Louis; Gravez	3:16
11.	"Sorry Not Sorry"	Tiller; Timothy Mosley; Jetmir Salil	Timbaland; Milli Beatz	3:20
12.	"Been That Way"	Tiller; Mosley; Evan Barnes, Jr.	Timbaland; Fade MaJah	3:19
13.	"Overtime"	Tiller; Huizar	J-Louis	3:38
14.	"Right My Wrongs"	Tiller; Tommy Evans; Ruby Wood; Dominic Howard; Hernandez; Neil Dominique; Watson; De'jon Howerton; Michael Williams	Foreign Teck; AR; 5 Star Rico; The Klasix; Holladay; Dominique	4:09
Total length:				44:58

Deluxe edition
No.	Title	Writer(s)	Producer(s)	Length
15.	"Just Another Interlude"	Missy Elliott; Aubrey Graham; Maurice White; Verdine White; Mosley; Noah Shebib; Omari Grandberry	J-Louis	3:04
16.	"Self Righteous"	Tiller; A. Owens; Foye; Thomas; Janet Jackson; Dana Stinson; James Harris; Terry Lewis	Ayo; Keyz; Ian Jeffrey Thomas	4:01
17.	"Rambo (Last Blood)" (featuring The Weeknd)	Tiller; Abel Tesfaye; Scruggs; C. Owens; Basner	Syk Sense; Chris King	3:49
18.	"Outro (Thank You)"	Tiller; Huizar	J-Louis; Teddy Walton; Cameone	1:18
Total length:				57:10

Notes

- "Don't" contains vocals by Vory.

Sample credits

- "Exchange" contains a samples of "Swing My Way" performed by K. P. & Envyi.
- "For However Long" contain a sample of "Alone" performed by Jodeci.
- "Don't" contains a lyrical interpolation of "Shake It Off" performed by Mariah Carey and features uncredited vocals from Vory.
- "Ten Nine Fourteen" contains a sample of "Nobody" performed by Keith Sweat featuring Athena Cage.
- "The Sequence" contains a sample of "Sexual" performed by Shai.
- "Rambo" contains a sample of "Березовый Сок (Birch Sap)" performed by Eduard Khil
- "Sorry Not Sorry" contains a sample of the intro to "Questions" performed by Carrie Lucas as well as a sample from Street Fighter II: The World Warrior.
- "Been That Way" contains a sample of "Back That Azz Up" performed by Juvenile featuring Lil Wayne.
- "Right My Wrongs" contains a sample of "All Yours" performed by Submotion Orchestra.
- "Just Another Interlude" contains a sample of "Bria's Interlude" performed by Drake featuring Omarion
- "Self Righteous" contains a sample of "Would You Mind" performed by Janet Jackson.

== Charts ==
=== Weekly charts ===
Weekly chart performance for Trapsoul
Chart (2015–2016)	Peak position
Canadian Albums (Billboard)	29
Dutch Albums (Album Top 100)	40
French Albums (SNEP)	192
Norwegian Albums (VG-lista)	16
Swedish Albums (Sverigetopplistan)	52
UK Albums (Official Charts)	41
UK R&B Albums (Official Charts)	6
US Billboard 200	8
US Top R&B/Hip-Hop Albums (Billboard)	2

2024–2026 weekly chart performance for Trapsoul
Chart (2024–2026)	Peak position
Belgian Albums (Ultratop Flanders)	200
Portuguese Albums (AFP)	128
Swiss Albums (Schweizer Hitparade)	62

=== Year-end charts ===
Year-end chart performance for Trapsoul
Chart (2016)	Position
US Billboard 200	11
US Top R&B/Hip-Hop Albums (Billboard)	8
Chart (2017)	Position
US Billboard 200	56
US Top R&B/Hip-Hop Albums (Billboard)	33
Chart (2018)	Position
US Billboard 200	112
Chart (2019)	Position
US Billboard 200	190
Chart (2020)	Position
US Billboard 200	192
Chart (2022)	Position
US Billboard 200	153
Chart (2023)	Position
US Billboard 200	108
US Top R&B/Hip-Hop Albums (Billboard)	65
Chart (2024)	Position
US Billboard 200	86
US Top R&B/Hip-Hop Albums (Billboard)	29
Chart (2025)	Position
US Billboard 200	99
US Top R&B/Hip-Hop Albums (Billboard)	34

=== Decade-end charts ===
Decade-end chart performance for Trapsoul
Chart (2010–2019)	Position
US Billboard 200	100

== Certifications ==
Certifications for Trapsoul
Region	Certification	Certified units/sales
Canada (Music Canada)	Platinum	80,000^{‡}
Denmark (IFPI Danmark)	Platinum	20,000^{‡}
New Zealand (RMNZ)	2× Platinum	30,000^{‡}
South Africa (RISA)	Platinum	50,000^{‡}
United Kingdom (BPI)	Platinum	300,000^{‡}
United States (RIAA)	5× Platinum	5,000,000^{‡}
^{‡} Sales+streaming figures based on certification alone.
