= Isles (Bicep album) =

Studio album by Bicep
- Released: 22 January 2021
- Genre: Electronic
- Length: 49:26
- Label: Ninja Tune
- Producer: Bicep

Bicep chronology
Bicep (2017)	Isles (2021)	Slug (2027)

Professional ratings
Aggregate scores
Source	Rating
AnyDecentMusic?	7.8/10
Metacritic	78/100
Review scores
Source	Rating
AllMusic	3.5/5 stars
Beats per Minute	73%
Clash	8/10
DIY	4/5 stars
The Guardian	4/5 stars
The Independent	4/5 stars
NME	4/5 stars
Pitchfork	6.3/10

Isles is the second studio album by electronic music duo Bicep, released through Ninja Tune on 22 January 2021. It was recorded over a two-year period and preceded by the single "Apricots".

The album was nominated for the 2021 Choice Music Prize for Best Irish Album. The album was also considered for the 2021 Northern Ireland Music Prize.

Isles was number one on the midweek UK Albums Chart for the week beginning 25 January 2021, before debuting at number two on the final chart.

== Release ==
On 6 October 2020, Bicep announced the release of their second studio album.

=== Singles ===
The first single from the album, "Atlas", was released on 25 March 2020. The band explained the meaning of the song: "It would’ve been unthinkable to foresee the circumstances this track would be released in when we were making it. Our frame of mind was so positive then, fresh off the back of our live tour, full of excitement for the next phase. ‘Atlas’ was our attempt at summing up some of the euphoric moments we experienced on that tour across those two years. It feels like those moments are very far away for all of us right now, but we hope this serves as some form of distraction amidst all this chaos."

The second single "Apricots" was released on 6 October 2020, alongside the announcement of the album.

On 17 November 2020, Bicep release the third single "Saku". The single features guest musician Clara La San.

The fourth single "Sundial" was released on 12 January 2021. Of the single, the band said: "This is probably one of the simplest tracks on the album, it grew from a faulty Jupiter 6 arp recording. Our trigger isn't working properly and the arp skips notes randomly. This was a small segment taken from a recording of Andy just playing the arp live whilst we were just trying to figure out what was going wrong. We actually loved what it had produced and wrote some chords around it, guided by the feeling of this recording."

== Tour ==
The band went on a UK tour in September 2021.

== Critical reception ==
Isles was met with "generally favorable" reviews from critics. At Metacritic, which assigns a weighted average rating out of 100 to reviews from mainstream publications, the album received an average score of 78 based on 14 reviews. At AnyDecentMusic?, the release was given a 7.8 out of 10 based on 22 reviews.

In a review for AllMusic, Paul Simspson wrote: "After taking their material on the road and building a new studio, the London-based duo crafted their second album, Isles, which is inspired by the multi-cultural environment of their adopted home city. The majority of the record's tracks essentially deliver variations on the signature Bicep sound, starting with a sturdy syncopated beat and building up intricate melodies and twisted synth arpeggios until everything reaches an emotional peak. Haunting vocals usually add to the drama." Gareth O'Malley of Beats per Minute explained: "Isles is an album caught between euphoric escapism and melancholic introspection. Isles pulls from diverse scenes and genres seemingly at will, folding all sorts of inspiration into an album that's mostly primed for the dancefloor." Mike Watkins of Clash described the album as "a brilliant pick me up, a dazzling set of songs that tap into our innermost impulses. A colourful way to remember those good times, and one that is perfectly prepared for our eventual return to the dance floor."

== Track listing ==
No.	Title	Length
1.	"Atlas"	5:52
2.	"Cazenove"	4:22
3.	"Apricots"	4:06
4.	"Saku" (featuring Clara La San)	4:57
5.	"Lido"	3:20
6.	"X" (featuring Clara La San)	5:33
7.	"Rever" (featuring Julia Kent)	5:19
8.	"Sundial"	4:35
9.	"Fir"	5:23
10.	"Hawk" (featuring Machina)	5:59
Total length:		49:26

Japanese edition and deluxe 3LP bonus tracks
No.	Title	Length
11.	"Light"
12.	"Siena" (featuring Clara La San)
13.	"Meli (I)"

== Charts ==
Chart performance for Isles
Chart (2021)	Peak position
Australian Albums (ARIA)	12
Belgian Albums (Ultratop Flanders)	3
Belgian Albums (Ultratop Wallonia)	97
Dutch Albums (Album Top 100)	28
German Albums (Offizielle Top 100)	8
Irish Albums (Official Charts)	2
Scottish Albums (Official Charts)	2
Swiss Albums (Schweizer Hitparade)	26
UK Albums (Official Charts)	2
UK Dance Albums (Official Charts)	1
US Heatseekers Albums (Billboard)	20
US Top Album Sales (Billboard)	73
US Top Dance Albums (Billboard)	12
