= Biceps (disambiguation) =

Biceps is a muscle located on the inside of the upper arm.

Biceps may also refer to:

- Biceps femoris, a muscle of the upper leg
- Biceps (prosody), a point in a metrical pattern
- BICEPS, the current treatment route for combat stress reaction employed by the U.S. military
- "Biceps", a 1941 story by Nelson Algren in The Neon Wilderness

== See also ==
- Bicep (disambiguation)
- Biceps femoris muscle, one of the hamstring muscles of the back of each thigh
