= Swing My Way =

Single by K.P. & Envyi

from the album Rhythm & Quad 166, Vol. 1 and Music from the Motion Picture Can't Hardly Wait
- Released: October 27, 1997 (CD), 1998 (vinyl)
- Recorded: 1997; PatchWerk Recording Studios; Atlanta, Georgia
- Genre: Miami bass
- Length: 4:09 (radio version)
- Label: EastWest (original); Elektra (remix)
- Songwriters: Michael O. Johnson, Javalyn Johnson, Carlton Mahone Jr., Christopher Bridges
- Producers: Mixzo (original version); Carl Mo (remix)

Alternative cover
- 2021 Streaming re-issue

"Swing My Way" is the only single released by American hip-hop duo K.P. & Envyi. The song reached No. 6 on the Billboard Hot 100 for the week ending March 14, 1998. It entered the Hot 100 on the week ending December 27, 1997, at No. 86.

Since the release of "Swing My Way", a few of the people who worked behind the scenes went on to have success on their own. Atlanta rapper Ludacris penned the verses for the remix version of the song. Background singer Algebra Blessett emerged as a neo-soul singer a decade after her appearance. Mixzo went on to produce for artists like Fiend, Juvenile, Lil Wayne, Aaliyah, Ludacris, and Maxwell. The producer of the remix, Carl Mo, became best known for his production of the 2003 OutKast song "The Way You Move". American singer Bryson Tiller sampled "Swing My Way" in his hit track "Exchange", and American rapper J. Cole sampled it in his song "Deja Vu". Lastly, a young Polow Da Don was featured as the love interest in the music video, which was directed by visual artist and designer Ron Norsworthy.

== Charts and certifications ==
=== Weekly charts ===
Chart (1998)	Peak position
Australia (ARIA)	165
Netherlands (Dutch Top 40 Tipparade)	4
Netherlands (Single Top 100)	54
New Zealand (Recorded Music NZ)	14
UK Singles (Official Charts)	14
UK Hip Hop/R&B (Official Charts)	3
US Billboard Hot 100	6
US Dance Singles Sales (Billboard)	8
US Hot R&B/Hip-Hop Songs (Billboard)	5
US Rhythmic Airplay (Billboard)	5

=== Year-end charts ===
Chart (1998)	Position
US Billboard Hot 100	52
US Hot R&B/Hip-Hop Songs (Billboard)	26

=== Certifications ===
Region	Certification	Certified units/sales
United States (RIAA)	Gold	600,000

== Personnel ==
- K.P. - performer
- Envyi - performer, background vocals
- Mixzo - producer
- Michael O. Johnson - writer
- Javalyn Hall-Johnson - writer
- Algebra Blessett - background vocals
- Randell Rivers - Lead guitar
- Mike Wilson - recording engineer
- Neal H. Pogue - mixing

=== Remix ===
- Carl Mo - additional production, vocal arrangement, music
- Christopher Bridges - writer
- Craig Love - additional acoustic guitar
- Emperor Searcy - scratches
