= Bryson Tiller (album) =

- Original cover (Note: Digital and streaming editions replaced the album's original cover art with a new one, issued in 2025, showing Tiller (wearing a white hoodie) standing throughout a violet-magenta background.)

Studio album by Bryson Tiller
- Released: April 5, 2024
- Length: 48:50
- Labels: TrapSoul; RCA
- Producers: Allen Ritter; Azad Right; BassClarity; BB; Bill Mosgrove; Boi-1da; Busco; Cameron Joseph; Charlie Heat; Che Ecru; Chiiild; Chuck Gibson; Coleman; D'Mile; DaBlackMic; Euroz; FIFTEENAFTER; FKi 1st; FnZ; Frank Dukes; HeyMicki; Jack Uriah; Jeia; Johan Lenox; Kaytranada; Lee Major; Leon Thomas; Matty Spats; Neil Dominique; NinetyFour; NOFI; Obvi; OceanOnTheRocks; Poo Bear; Sasha Sirota; Sean Momberger; SykSense; Thurdi; Tommy Parker; TylianMTB; xSDTRK; Vinylz; Wow Jones; Wyatt Woodley

Bryson Tiller chronology
A Different Christmas (2021)	Bryson Tiller (2024)	Solace & The Vices (2025)

Singles from Bryson Tiller
- 1. "Outside" Released: September 8, 2022; 2. "Whatever She Wants" Released: February 13, 2024; 3. "Calypso" Released: March 19, 2024

Bryson Tiller is the fourth album by American singer-songwriter Bryson Tiller, released on April 5, 2024, via TrapSoul and RCA Records. It is his first full-length album in three and a half years, following the release of Anniversary in October 2020. Production was primarily handled by Charlie Heat, alongside HeyMicki, Vinylz, Jeia, Scotty Lavell Coleman, Poo Bear, and Sasha Sirota, among others. It features guest appearances from Victoria Monét and Clara La San.

== Background and promotion ==
Prior to the release of Anniversary, Tiller was working on a since-scrapped album titled Serenity, for which he was waiting on sample clearances in 2019. Serenity was further teased several times by Tiller; however, it was eventually shelved due to unknown reasons

On October 31, 2021, Tiller released a mixtape, Killer Instinct 2: The Nightmare Before, on a private link that he texted to his fans using the community number he had made earlier in 2020. The mixtape featured a variety of freestyles over current beats at the time, including Normani's "Wild Side", Brent Faiyaz's "Gravity" and Busta Rhymes' "New York Shit". This was followed almost three weeks later by his first Christmas EP, A Different Christmas released on November 19. Tiller said the project was inspired by Ariana Grande and Justin Bieber, the latter of whom featured in the song "Lonely Christmas". Tiller's daughter Halo also appears on the closing track.

On August 19, 2023, the mixtape Slum Tiller, Volume One was released exclusively on SoundCloud. This was the first in a series inspired by Detroit rap and the group Slum Village, and was also a way for him to put out new music without the restrictions of sample clearances. Volume 2 was released four months later on November 9, and featured the song "Whatever She Wants". On January 2, 2024, Tiller announced the weekly music program Tiller Tuesdays, which saw him release music on SoundCloud every Tuesday from January 9 to March 12, 2024. Within the program, the third volume of Slum Tiller was also released, on January 23.

On March 19, 2024, the album Bryson Tiller was officially announced with a trailer.

=== Singles ===
"Outside" was released as the album's lead single on September 8, 2022, the song sampling the Ying Yang Twins' 2005 single "Wait (The Whisper Song)". Its music video was released a month later on October 18, with the Ying Yang Twins making an appearance. A batch of singles were initially planned for the album after the release of "Outside", but due to sample clearances, the songs were scrapped and removed from the album.

"Whatever She Wants" was released as the album's second single on February 13, 2024. Originally taken from Slum Tiller, Volume 2, the song was released on all streaming platforms after gaining popularity on TikTok, and featured a new second verse, unlike the original SoundCloud version.

"Calypso" was the album's third single, released on March 19, 2024, along with the album's preorder.

== Critical reception ==
Professional ratings
Review scores
Source	Rating
AllMusic	3.5/5 stars
Clash	9/10
HipHopDX	3.8/5 stars

Bryson Tiller was met with positive reviews from music critics. Writing for AllMusic, Andy Kellman described the project as a "coherent LP of contemporary R&B ballads full of sweet nothings, boasts, grievances, and ultimatums". Clash's Jessica Rogers wrote that the exclusivity of features on the album "pays off" as it allows Tiller to "shine a light on his incredible versatility". Rogers described the LP as a "sonic rollercoaster that leaves you feeling overwhelmed in a good way" before she concluded her review, noting that the album is a "soundtrack for every mood possible". Will Schube for HipHopDX wrote that Tiller "[relies] on the power of his voice" which allows him to "[recontextualize] the genre", however, at times he "grows complacent", resulting in several filler tracks.

Writing for Billboard, Kyle Denis stated that the LP honors Tiller's roots, "while also showcasing how wide-ranging his versatility can be". Denis stated that the record could have "benefited from some trimming" as some tracks lack substance and add nothing to the record. Concluding his review, Denis wrote that "Bryson Tiller is built to last through any season" and is a project for "lovers".

== Commercial performance ==
Bryson Tiller debuted at number twelve on the US Billboard 200 chart, earning 39,000 album-equivalent units, (including 1,000 copies as pure album sales) in its first week.

== Track listing ==
Bryson Tiller track listing
No.	Title	Writer(s)	Producer(s)	Length
1.	"http://"	Bryson Tiller; Ernest Brown; Matt Spatola; Michaela Moore; Chuck Gibson	Charlie Heat; HeyMicki; Matty Spats; Gibson	0:35
2.	"Attention"	Tiller; Joshua Scruggs; Cameron Joseph; Scotty Coleman	SykSense; Coleman; Joseph	3:36
3.	"Stay Gold"	Tiller; Andrew Glover; Eric Dugar; Coleman	Coleman; NinetyFour; Euroz	2:37
4.	"Persuasion" (featuring Victoria Monét)	Tiller; Victoria Monét; Brown; Dernst Emile II; Yonathan Ayal	D'Mile; xSDTRK; Charlie Heat	2:49
5.	"Ciao!"	Tiller; Brown; Andre Powell; Leon Thomas; Michael Mulé; Isaac De Boni; Justin White; Lawson; Noel Emanuel; Trocon Roberts Jr.; Tyler James Bryant	Charlie Heat; Thomas; FnZ; FKi 1st; NOFI; Justin Rose	2:05
6.	"Peace Interlude"	Tiller; Natalie Birch; Anderson Hernandez; Sean Momberger; Leigh Elliott; Bradley Baker; Bryant	Vinylz; Momberger; Lee Major; BB	2:11
7.	"Rich Boy"	Tiller; Marece Richards; Robert Crawford; Jamal Jones; Robert DeBarge; Gregory Williams; Hernandez; Adam Feeney; Matthew Samuels; Allen Ritter; Michee Patrick Lebrun	Vinylz; Boi-1da; Frank Dukes; Allen Ritter	2:21
8.	"Random Access Memory (RAM)" (featuring Clara La San)	Tiller; Francis Claire; Brown; Moore	Charlie Heat; HeyMicki	2:24
9.	"No Thank You"	Tiller; Powell; Brown; Troy Boyd II; William Mosgrove; Wyatt Woodley	Charlie Heat; Fifteenafter; Obvi; Bill Mosgrove; Woodley	2:17
10.	"Find My Way"	Tiller; Powell; Brown; Moore; Matt Busco	Charlie Heat; HeyMicki; Busco	2:42
11.	"Prize"	Tiller; Brown; Stephen Feigenbaum	Charlie Heat; Johan Lenox	2:48
12.	"Waterfalls"	Tiller; Powell; Destin Conrad; Febby Tan; Thomas Lumpkins	Jeia; Tommy Parker	1:44
13.	"Æon Lust"	Tiller; Louis Kevin Celestin; Leon McQuay III; Wendy Flower-Freeman; Bonnie Flower	Kaytranada; Thurdi; Mario Dragoi^{[m]}	2:23
14.	"Calypso"	Tiller; Michael Williams; Lebrun; Feliciano Ponce; Harissis Tsakmaklis; Jorge Cardoso; Luzian Tuetsch; Michael Johnson; McQuay	DaBlackMic; Che Ecru; Thurdi; BassCharity; TheOwnlyHope	3:08
15.	"Outside"	Tiller; Hernandez; Lamont Ishmael; Neil Dominique; Antoine Crooms; Abraham Augusto Herrera; Bryant; Eric Von Jackson; D'Ongelo Holmes	Vinylz; Jack Uriah; Wow Jones; Dominique	3:08
16.	"Undertow"	Tiller; Brown; Feigenbaum; Jason Boyd; Sasha Sirota	Poo Bear; Sirota	3:58
17.	"F4U"	Tiller; Brown; Donald DeGrate; Roger Troutman; Terry Troutman	Charlie Heat	2:02
18.	"Assume the Position"	Tiller; Boyd; Sirota	Poo Bear; Sirota	3:21
19.	"Whatever She Wants" (bonus)	Tiller; Tylian Jamel Francois; Tiffany Majette	TylianMTB	2:41
Total length:				48:50

== Personnel ==
Musicians

- Bryson Tiller – vocals
- Kennedy – horns (track 5)
- Vinylz – programming (tracks 6, 7)
- Boi-1da – programming (track 7)
- Johan Lenox – strings (track 11)
- Lauren Santi – background vocals (track 13)
- Leon McQuay III – bass (track 13)
- Jeia – guitar (track 13)
- Yasmeen Al-Mazeedi – strings (track 14)
- Sasha Sirota – guitar (tracks 16, 18); background vocals, bass, programming (18)

Technical

- Mike Seaberg – mastering, production assistance (tracks 1–14, 16–18); engineering (19), engineering assistance (15, 19)
- Jaycen Joshua – mixing (all tracks), mastering (tracks 15, 19)
- Michael "Black Mic" Williams – engineering (tracks 1–14, 16–18)
- Jacob Richards – engineering assistance
- Chris Bhikoo – engineering assistance (tracks 1–14, 16–18)
- DJ Riggins – engineering assistance (track 15)

== Charts ==
=== Weekly charts ===
Weekly chart performance for Bryson Tiller
Chart (2024)	Peak position
Australian Albums (ARIA)	49
Australian Hip Hop/R&B Albums (ARIA)	12
Belgian Albums (Ultratop Flanders)	195
Canadian Albums (Billboard)	21
Dutch Albums (Album Top 100)	75
New Zealand Albums (RMNZ)	24
Swiss Albums (Schweizer Hitparade)	64
UK Albums (Official Charts)	34
US Billboard 200	12
US Top R&B/Hip-Hop Albums (Billboard)	4

=== Year-end charts ===
Year-end chart performance for Bryson Tiller
Chart (2024)	Position
US Top R&B/Hip-Hop Albums (Billboard)	71

== Certifications ==
Certifications for Bryson Tiller
Region	Certification	Certified units/sales
United States (RIAA)	Gold	500,000^{‡}
^{‡} Sales+streaming figures based on certification alone.
