= A Different Christmas =

EP by Bryson Tiller
- Released: November 19, 2021
- Length: 18:20
- Label: RCA
- Producers: Bryson Tiller; Carter Lang; Cool & Dre; Ekofo; J-Louis; Jeff "Gitty" Gitelman; Nes; Poo Bear; Oliver "Junior" Frid; Sasha Sirota; The Audibles

Bryson Tiller chronology
Anniversary (2020)	A Different Christmas (2021)	Bryson Tiller (2024)

Singles from A Different Christmas
- 1. "Lonely Christmas" Released: November 19, 2021

A Different Christmas is the first extended play by American singer-songwriter Bryson Tiller. His first Christmas release, it was released through RCA Records on November 19, 2021. The EP features guest appearances from Kiana Ledé, Justin Bieber, Poo Bear, Tayla Parx, and Tiller's daughter, Halo. It marks the first time that Tiller has worked with any of the featured artists on the EP. Production was handled by Tiller himself, Poo Bear himself, Teddy Walton, Carter Lang, J-Louis, Cool & Dre, Emoko, Nes, the Audibles, Sasha Sirota, Oliver "Junior" Frid, and Jeff "Gitty" Gitelman. The project debuted and peaked at number 194 on the Billboard 200 for the chart week ending December 4, 2021. The EP was supported by one single, "Lonely Christmas", which features Justin Bieber and Poo Bear, and was released alongside a music video with the release of the EP.

== Background and promotion ==
On November 10, 2021, Tiller announced the project. Within the post, he stated that it was inspired by fellow singers Justin Bieber and Ariana Grande and their Christmas music that they have released previously. The tracklist was revealed exactly a week later, on November 17, 2021. Tiller told Essence that he came up with the project when thinking about how it feels to spend Christmas alone and it is specially made for his fans who are spending the holidays by themselves. It was also inspired by past events in his personal life. While creating the project, he recalled that he thought about how it feels to spend Christmas alone, which he has done that before. His purpose of the EP is to let his fans know that they are not alone for Christmas even if they are spending it alone. He also wanted to be on different instrumentals than what he regularly sings on. All seven tracks from the EP consist of a "combination of soul samples with his patented trap-like snares [drums]". The lead and only single, "Lonely Christmas", featuring Justin Bieber and American singer-songwriter and record producer Poo Bear, was released with a music video on November 19, 2021.

== Track listing ==
A Different Christmas track listing
No.	Title	Writer(s)	Producer(s)	Length
1.	"Be Mine This Christmas"	Bryson Tiller; Travis Walton; Carter Lang; Joshua Huizer; Anthony Newley; Leslie Bricusse; Ben Lusher	Teddy Walton; Lang; J-Louis	3:23
2.	"Cold December Interlude"	Tiller; Marcello Valenzano; Andre Lyon; Michael McCary; Shawn Stockman; Rayshon Cobbs	Cool & Dre	1:19
3.	"Presents" (featuring Kiana Ledé)	Tiller; Kiana Brown; Kevin Ekofo; Philip Coleman, Jr.	Ekofo; Nes	2:40
4.	"I'll Be Home For Christmas"	Walter Kent; Kim Gannon	Tiller	1:36
5.	"Lonely Christmas" (featuring Justin Bieber and Poo Bear)	Tiller; Justin Bieber; Jason Boyd; Dominic Jordan; Jimmy Giannos; Sasha Sirota	Poo Bear; The Audibles; Sirota	3:50
6.	"Ain't a Lonely Christmas Song" (featuring Tayla Parx)	Tiller; Tayla Parx; Kameron Glasper; Oliver Frid	Oliver "Junior" Frid	2:52
7.	"Winter Wonderland" (featuring Halo)	Felix Bernard; Dick Smith	Jeff "Gitty" Gitelman	2:36
Total length:				18:20

Notes

- Every track is stylized in all lowercase. For example, "Lonely Christmas" is stylized as "lonely christmas".

== Personnel ==
Musicians

- Bryson Tiller – vocals (all tracks), songwriting (tracks 1–3, 5, 6), production (track 4)
- Teddy Walton – production (track 1), songwriting (track 1)
- Carter Lang – production (track 1), songwriting (track 1)
- J-Louis – production (track 1), songwriting (track 1)
- Anthony Newley – songwriting (track 1)
- Leslie Bricusse – songwriting (track 1)
- Ben Lusher – songwriting (track 1)
- Cool & Dre
  - Cool – production (track 2), songwriting (track 2), programming (track 2)
  - Dre – production (track 2), songwriting (track 2), programming (track 2)
- Michael McCary – songwriting (track 2)
- Shawn Stockman – songwriting (track 2)
- Rayshon Cobbs – songwriting (track 2)
- Kiana Ledé – vocals (track 3), songwriting (track 3)
- Ekofo – production (track 3), songwriting (track 3)
- Nes – production (track 3), songwriting (track 3)
- Walter Kent – songwriting (track 4)
- Kim Gannon – songwriting (track 4)
- Justin Bieber – vocals (track 5), songwriting (track 5)
- Poo Bear – vocals (track 5), songwriting (track 5), production (track 5)
- The Audibles
  - Dominic Jordan – production (track 5), songwriting (track 5)
  - Jimmy Giannos – production (track 5), songwriting (track 5)
- Sasha Sirota – production (track 5), songwriting (track 5)
- Tayla Parx – vocals (track 6), songwriting (track 6)
- Kam Parker – songwriting (track 6)
- Oliver "Junior" Frid – production (track 6), songwriting (track 6)
- Halo – vocals (track 7)
- Felix Bernard – songwriting (track 7)
- Dick Smith – songwriting (track 7)
- Jeff "Gitty" Gitelman – production (track 7), bass (track 7), guitar (track 7), piano (track 7)
- Cody Sommer – drums (track 7)
- Ian Roller-Garelick – saxophone (track 7)
- Sean Shackelford – trombone (track 7)
- John Panos – trumpet (track 7)

Technical

- Jaycen Joshua – mixing (all tracks), mastering (tracks 5, 6)
- 808 Ray – miscellaneous production (track 2)
- DJ Riggins – assistant engineering (tracks 3–7)
- Jacob Richards – assistant engineering (tracks 3–7)
- Mike Seaberg – assistant engineering (tracks 3–7)
- Josh Gudwin – miscellaneous production (track 5), vocal production (track 5), recording (track 5)
- Ben Rice – miscellaneous production (track 5)

== Charts ==
Chart performance for A Different Christmas
Chart (2021)	Peak position
Canadian Albums (Billboard)	89
US Billboard 200	194
US Top R&B Albums (Billboard)	20
