= Wait on It =

2024 song by Jeremih

Single by Jeremih featuring Bryson Tiller and Chris Brown
- Released: June 28, 2024
- Genre: R&B
- Length: 3:25
- Label: Late Nights; Pulse; Concord
- Songwriters: Jeremy Felton; Bryson Tiller; Christopher Brown
- Producers: Retro Future; Cássio

Jeremih singles chronology
"Room" (2023)	"Wait on It" (2024)	"Sick" (2024)

Bryson Tiller singles chronology
"Calypso" (2024)	"Wait on It" (2024)	"Can We Talk?" (2025)

Chris Brown singles chronology
"UnLonely" (2024)	"Wait on It" (2024)	"Lightning" (2024)

Music video
- "Wait on It" on YouTube

"Wait on It" is a song by American singer Jeremih, featuring guest appearances from Chris Brown and Bryson Tiller. It was released on June 28, 2024, by Late Nights Records, under exclusive license to Pulse Records, and distributed by Concord.

It is Jeremih's first single following his departure from Def Jam Recordings the prior February.

== Music video ==
The music video for "Wait on It" was released alongside the song, and was directed by Ben Marc.

== Charts ==
Chart performance for "Wait on It"
Chart (2024)	Peak position
New Zealand Hot Singles (RMNZ)	4
US Hot R&B/Hip-Hop Songs (Billboard)	48
US R&B/Hip-Hop Airplay (Billboard)	15
US Rhythmic Airplay (Billboard)	20
