= Bicep (duo) =

Northern Irish electronic dance duo

- Origin: Belfast, Northern Ireland
- Genres: Electronic; UK garage; breakbeat
- Years active: 2009–present
- Label: Ninja Tune
- Members: Andrew Ferguson; Matthew McBriar
- Website: Official website

Bicep are an electronic music production and DJ duo from Belfast, Northern Ireland, consisting of Andrew Ferguson and Matthew McBriar.

== History ==
Bicep was formed in 2009 as a production and DJing pair in London. The duo, childhood friends, created a blog called "Feel My Bicep", which was used to post lost and forgotten disco, Chicago house, Detroit techno and Italo disco edits.

They released tracks on labels Throne of Blood, Traveller Records and Mystery Meat before joining Will Saul's Aus Music and setting up their own label Feel My Bicep in September 2012. That year the pair were awarded DJ Mag's 'Best of British Breakthrough DJ' award.

After signing to Ninja Tune in 2017, Bicep released their debut album Bicep, which went in at number 20 on the UK Albums Chart, and received positive reviews from publications such as Pitchfork, The Guardian, Resident Advisor and Mixmag. The lead single, "Glue", was voted by the public as DJ Mag's (Best of British) Track of the Year. It also reached number 1 on Amazon's Best Electronic of 2017, and came second in Mixmag's 100 Best Tracks of 2017.

Bicep released their second album Isles on Ninja Tune on 22 January 2021. They released the lead single "Apricots" with a music video from BAFTA-winner director Mark Jenkin. "Apricots" scored Top-50 entries in both the UK's Official Singles Chart and Billboard's Dance/Electronic Songs Chart, was named Billboard's #1 dance track of 2020, hit #1 on the UK's Shazam chart, and spent 10 weeks on the BBC Radio 1 playlist.

The album was nominated for Best Irish Album of 2021 for the Choice Music Prize.

Isles was number one on the midweek UK Albums Chart for the week beginning 25 January 2021, before debuting at number two on the final chart, scooping a number 1 on the UK Official Vinyl Albums Chart, additionally breaking into multiple Billboard charts including number 12 on the Dance/Electronic Chart.

The duo made a pivot to ticketed streams during the coronavirus pandemic, delivering two shows broadcast across 5 timezones. The shows were watched in more than 70 countries worldwide, giving fans new live material ahead of the return of in-person shows. The second global stream was recorded at London's Saatchi Gallery and was awarded four stars by The Guardian, with NME calling it an innovative and boundary-pushing audiovisual show.

Following the release of Isles, Bicep were nominated in two categories at the 2021 BRIT Awards for 'British Group' and 'Breakthrough Artist'.

In August 2024, McBriar received brain surgery for a rare craniopharyngioma tumour on his pituitary gland.

== Live performances ==
Between 2017 and 2018, the duo embarked on a live headline world tour to venues across the world, including the US, Japan and Europe. In the UK, they played shows at Electric Brixton, Roundhouse and three consecutive dates alongside Overmono at Printworks in London, which was filmed by Resident Advisor and one of their final live shows until 2020.

Bicep headlined their first major British festival at Field Day in August 2021 and were the Sunday headliners on the West Holts Stage at Glastonbury in 2022. They returned to Glastonbury's IICON stage in 2024, performing their audio visual set CHROMA.

== Discography ==
=== Studio albums ===
| Title | Details | Peak chart positions | | | | | | | Certifications |
| Title | Details | UK | AUS | BEL (FL) | GER | IRE | NLD | SWI | Certifications |
|---|---|---|---|---|---|---|---|---|---|
| Bicep | Released: 1 September 2017; Label: Ninja Tune; Format: Digital download, CD, streaming | 20 | — | 113 | — | 67 | — | — | BPI: Silver |
| Isles | Released: 22 January 2021; Label: Ninja Tune; Format: Digital download, CD, streaming | 2 | 12 | 3 | 8 | 2 | 28 | 26 | BPI: Silver |

=== Compilation albums ===
| Title | Details | UK | AUS | BEL (FL) | GER | IRE | NLD | SWI | Certifications |
|---|---|---|---|---|---|---|---|---|---|
| CHROMA 000 | Released: 14 November 2025; Label: CHROMA; Format: LP, digital download, streaming | — | — | — | — | — | — | — | |

=== Extended plays ===
| Title | Details |
|---|---|
| EP 1 | Released: 6 December 2010; Label: Throne of Blood; Format: Digital download |
| EP 2 | Released: 13 June 2011; Label: Throne of Blood; Format: Digital download |
| Silk | Released: 15 June 2011; Label: Throne of Blood; Format: Digital download |
| Vision of Love | Released: 24 September 2012; Label: Feel My Bicep; Format: Digital download |
| You/Don't | Released: 16 July 2012; Label: Aus Music; Format: Digital download |
| Stash | Released: 15 April 2013; Label: Aus Music; Format: Digital download |
| Circles | Released: 19 May 2014; Label: Aus Music; Format: Digital download |
| Lyk Lyk | Released: 29 September 2014; Label: Feel My Bicep; Format: Digital download |
| Just | Released: 19 June 2015; Label: AUS Records; Format: Digital download |
| Dahlia | Released: 25 September 2015; Label: Feel My Bicep; Format: Digital download |
| Aura | Released: 15 June 2017; Label: Ninja Tune; Format: Digital download |
| Glue | Released: 3 November 2017; Label: Ninja Tune; Format: Digital download |
| Vale | Released: 2017; Label: Ninja Tune; Format: Digital download |
| Rain | Released: 11 April 2018; Label: Ninja Tune; Format: Digital download |
| TAKKUUK (Original Soundtrack) | Released: 25 July 2025; Label: EarthSonic / Ninja Tune; Format: Digital download, streaming |

=== Singles ===
| Title | Year | Peak chart positions | | | Certifications | Album |
| Title | Year | UK | BEL (FL) Tip | IRE | Certifications | Album |
|---|---|---|---|---|---|---|
| "Darwin" | 2010 | — | — | — | | EP 1 |
| "313" / "The Winter" | 2010 | — | — | — | | Non-album single |
| "Vision of Love" | 2012 | — | — | — | | Vision of Love |
| "Getcha Boi" | 2012 | — | — | — | | Vision of Love |
| "Make Love in Public Places" | 2012 | — | — | — | | Non-album single |
| "Vision of Love" | 2013 | — | — | — | | Vision of Love |
| "Sacrifice" (with Simian Mobile Disco) | 2013 | — | — | — | | Non-album singles |
| "D-Mil (Club & Dub)" (with Midland) | 2014 | — | — | — | | Non-album singles |
| "Lyk Lyk" (with Hammer) | 2014 | — | — | — | | Lyk Lyk |
| "Satisfy" | 2014 | — | — | — | | Non-album single |
| "Dahlia" (with Hammer) | 2015 | — | — | — | | Dahlia |
| "Just" | 2015 | — | — | — | | Just |
| "Aura" | 2017 | — | — | — | | Bicep |
| "Glue" | 2017 | — | 11 | — | BPI: Platinum | Bicep |
| "Vale" | 2017 | — | — | — | | Bicep |
| "Rain" | 2018 | — | — | — | | Bicep |
| "Atlas" | 2020 | 91 | — | 90 | BPI: Silver | Isles |
| "Apricots" | 2020 | 42 | 25 | 54 | BPI: Gold | Isles |
| "Saku" (featuring Clara La San) | 2020 | — | — | — | | Isles |
| "Sundial" | 2021 | — | — | — | | Isles |
| "Meli (II)" | 2022 | — | — | — | | Non-album singles |
| "Water" (featuring Clara La San) | 2022 | — | — | — | | Non-album singles |
| "Chroma 001 HELIUM" | 2024 | — | — | — | | CHROMA Series |
| "Chroma 002 L.A.V.A" | 2024 | — | — | — | | CHROMA Series |
| "Chroma 003 Bi83" | 2024 | — | — | — | | CHROMA Series |
| "Chroma 004 ROLA" | 2024 | — | — | — | | CHROMA Series |
| "Chroma 005 A.L.O.E" | 2024 | — | — | — | | CHROMA Series |
| "Chroma 007 STEALL" | 2024 | — | — | — | | CHROMA Series |
| "Chroma 008 TANGZ" | 2025 | — | — | — | | CHROMA Series |
| "Chroma 009 KR36" | 2025 | — | — | — | | CHROMA Series |
| "Chroma 010 BRILLO" | 2025 | — | — | — | | CHROMA Series |
"—" denotes a recording that did not chart.

=== Other charted songs ===
| Title | Year | Peak chart positions | Album |
| Title | Year | BEL (FL) Tip | Album |
|---|---|---|---|
| "Cazenove" | 2021 | 46 | Isles |

== Awards and nominations ==
| Year | Association | Category | Nominated work | Result | Ref |
|---|---|---|---|---|---|
| 2020 | DJ Mag Best of British Awards | Best Track | "Atlas" | Won | |
| 2021 | Brit Awards | Best British Group | Themselves | Nominated | |
| 2021 | Brit Awards | Best New Artist | Themselves | Nominated | |
| 2021 | Berlin Music Video Awards | Best Experimental | "Apricots" | Nominated | |
| 2021 | Berlin Music Video Awards | Best Editor | "Saku" (featuring Clara La San) | Nominated | |
| 2021 | UK Music Video Awards | Best Cinematography in a Video | "Saku" (featuring Clara La San) | Nominated | |
| 2021 | UK Music Video Awards | Best Editing in a Video | "Saku" (featuring Clara La San) | Nominated | |
| 2021 | UK Music Video Awards | Best Visual Effects in a Video | "Saku" (featuring Clara La San) | Won | |
| 2021 | Choice Music Prize | Best Irish Album | Isles | Nominated | |
| 2022 | Libera Awards | Marketing Genius | Isles | Nominated | |
| 2023 | Libera Awards | Best Dance Record | "Water" | Won | |
