= Lonely Christmas (Bryson Tiller song) =

2021 single by Bryson Tiller featuring Justin Bieber and Poo Bear

Single by Bryson Tiller featuring Justin Bieber and Poo Bear

from the album A Different Christmas
- Released: November 19, 2021
- Genre: Pop
- Length: 3:50
- Label: RCA
- Songwriters: Bryson Tiller; Justin Bieber; Jason Boyd; Dominic Jordan; Jimmy Giannos; Sasha Sirota
- Producers: Poo Bear; The Audibles; Sirota

Bryson Tiller singles chronology
"Just Right" (2021)	"Lonely Christmas" (2021)	"The Chipmunk Song (Christmas Don't Be Late)" (2021)

Justin Bieber singles chronology
"Rockin' Around the Christmas Tree" (2021)	"Lonely Christmas" (2021)	"Wandered to LA" (2021)

Poo Bear singles chronology
"Distant Shore" (2021)	"Lonely Christmas" (2021)	"Favorite Human" (2022)

Music video
- "Lonely Christmas" on YouTube

"Lonely Christmas" (stylized as lonely christmas), is a song by American singer Bryson Tiller featuring Canadian singer Justin Bieber and fellow American singer Poo Bear, who produced it with the Audibles and Sasha Sirota. It was released through RCA Records on November 19, 2021, as the lead single from Tiller's debut extended play, A Different Christmas.

== Charts ==
Chart performance for "Lonely Christmas"
Chart (2021)	Peak position
Sweden Heatseeker (Sverigetopplistan)	13

== Release history ==
Release history for "Lonely Christmas"
Region	Date	Format	Label	Ref.
Italy	December 10, 2021	Radio airplay	Sony	
