= Exchange (song) =

Single by Bryson Tiller

from the album Trapsoul
- Released: March 8, 2016
- Genre: R&B; trap
- Length: 3:14
- Label: RCA
- Songwriters: Bryson Tiller; Javalyn Hall-Johnson; Michael Hernandez; Michael Johnson
- Producers: The MeKanics; Foreign Teck

Bryson Tiller singles chronology
| "Don't" (2015) | "Exchange" (2016) | "Sorry Not Sorry" (2016) |

"Exchange" is a track by American artist Bryson Tiller, released on March 8, 2016, as the second single from his debut studio album, Trapsoul (2015). the hit song features a sample from the introduction of K.P. & Envyi's 1998 hit "Swing My Way". The song received commercial success, peaking in the top 40 of the Billboard Hot 100 and earning Tiller his first Grammy Award nomination for Best R&B Song at the 59th annual ceremony.

== Music video ==
On January 13, 2016, it was rumored that actor Michael B. Jordan would be the director of the music video for "Exchange", but later Jordan denied the rumor. The video premiered on Pitchfork magazine's website on June 1, 2016, and was later uploaded to Tiller's Vevo channel. It was directed by Rohan Blair-Mangat. YouTube personality Symphani Soto plays Tiller's love interest in the video.

== Live performances ==
Tiller appeared on the Late Night with Seth Meyers on May 23, 2016, performing "Exchange". On June 26, 2016, he performed the song at the BET Awards. The song was also part of Tiller's Trapsoul Tour (2016).

== Remixes ==
In March 2016, American rapper Ace Hood released his remix of the song titled "X-Change".

== Controversy ==
Upon the release of J. Cole's album 4 Your Eyez Only, producers Vinylz and Boi-1da accused producer Foreign Teck (of The Mekanics) of stealing the beat, to Cole's track "Deja Vu" and giving it to Bryson Tiller, explaining why the tracks share similarities. Vinylz said Cole's track was recorded before Tiller's, and that he sent Foreign Teck a video of him making the beat to "Deja Vu", and a week later Teck posted a beat on Instagram with the same drums. Vinylz also alleged that Foreign Teck offered him publishing, a tacit admission that he had reverse engineered the beat. Another producer by the name of GMoney also made claims that he made the beat back in 2013.

== Commercial performance ==
"Exchange" debuted on the Billboard Hot 100 at number 98 for the chart dated November 14, 2015, eventually peaking at number 26 on the chart dating March 26, 2016, becoming Tiller's second top 40 hit. The single eventually spent 34 weeks on the chart going all the way to early July 2016

== Charts ==
=== Weekly charts ===
| Chart (2015–16) | Peak position |
|---|---|
| Canada Hot 100 (Billboard) | 75 |
| UK Singles (Official Charts Company) | 196 |
| UK Hip Hop/R&B (Official Charts) | 25 |
| US Billboard Hot 100 | 26 |
| US Hot R&B/Hip-Hop Songs (Billboard) | 8 |
| US Rhythmic Airplay (Billboard) | 11 |

=== Year-end charts ===
| Chart (2016) | Position |
|---|---|
| US Billboard Hot 100 | 53 |
| US Hot R&B/Hip-Hop Songs (Billboard) | 26 |

== Certifications ==
| Region | Certification | Certified units/sales |
|---|---|---|
| Australia (ARIA) | Platinum | 70,000^{‡} |
| Canada (Music Canada) | 6× Platinum | 480,000^{‡} |
| Denmark (IFPI Danmark) | Platinum | 90,000^{‡} |
| New Zealand (RMNZ) | 5× Platinum | 150,000^{‡} |
| Portugal (AFP) | Platinum | 20,000^{‡} |
| United Kingdom (BPI) | 2× Platinum | 1,200,000^{‡} |
| United States (RIAA) | 13× Platinum | 13,000,000^{‡} |
^{‡} Sales+streaming figures based on certification alone.
