= Sorry Not Sorry (Bryson Tiller song) =

Single by Bryson Tiller

from the album Trapsoul
- Released: June 21, 2016
- Recorded: 2014
- Genre: Hip-hop; trap
- Length: 3:20
- Label: RCA
- Songwriters: Bryson Tiller; Jetmir Salii; Timothy Mosley
- Producers: Timbaland; Milli Beatz

Bryson Tiller singles chronology
"Exchange" (2015)	"Sorry Not Sorry" (2016)	"Let Me Explain" (2016)

"Sorry Not Sorry" is a song by American singer Bryson Tiller. It was sent to urban radio on June 21, 2016, as the third single from his debut studio album, Trapsoul (2015). The song was written by Tiller, Jetmir Salii and Timbaland.

== Background and release ==
"Sorry Not Sorry" originally premiered in December 2014, via Tiller's SoundCloud page. In October 2015, he released his debut studio album, Trapsoul, which also included this track. On June 21, 2016, "Sorry Not Sorry" was sent to urban radio as the album's third official single. While talking about the recording sessions of the song in an interview with Billboard, Tiller said:

"Been That Way" is a song that Timbaland gave me. Actually, the beat is. And then he called me to come out there to Miami. I went out there to work with him and he gave me two beats for my project. One was "Sorry Not Sorry" and the other one was "Been That Way" and I recorded both of them in my hotel. I was going to record it at the Hit Factory, but I told Tim I don’t really like recording in big studios, so he bought me a whole bunch of equipment to record in my hotel.

== Music video ==
The song's music video premiered via Tiller's Vevo channel on October 14, 2015. It was filmed in Louisville, Kentucky and was directed by David M. Helman.

== Covers and remixes ==
In October 2015, English rapper Avelino released his cover version of "Sorry Not Sorry". In November 2015, American rapper Fabolous released his remix of the song, which appeared on his mixtape, Summertime Shootout.

== Charts ==
=== Weekly charts ===
Chart (2015–16)	Peak position
US Billboard Hot 100	67
US Hot R&B/Hip-Hop Songs (Billboard)	24
US Rhythmic Airplay (Billboard)	27

=== Year-end charts ===
Chart (2016)	Position
US Hot R&B/Hip-Hop Songs (Billboard)	80

== Certifications ==
Region	Certification	Certified units/sales
Canada (Music Canada)	Platinum	80,000^{‡}
New Zealand (RMNZ)	Gold	15,000^{‡}
United Kingdom (BPI)	Silver	200,000^{‡}
United States (RIAA)	2× Platinum	2,000,000^{‡}
^{‡} Sales+streaming figures based on certification alone.
