= K. P. & Envyi =

American hip hop group

K.P. & Envyi (born Khia Phillips and Susan Hedgepeth) is an American R&B and hip hop duo from Atlanta, Georgia and Charlotte, North Carolina, known for the 1997 single "Swing My Way" which peaked at No. 6 on the Billboard Hot 100, No. 14 on both the UK and New Zealand singles charts and No. 54 on the Dutch Single Top 100. The song was certified gold by the RIAA.

== 2000s ==
K.P. was featured on Sick Beav's 2005 song "Close Range" alongside Lil B-Stone.

Envyi was featured on two tracks on Lil Zane's 2003 album The Big Zane Theory. In 2009, she changed her stage name to Sioux Lane and released the album Tell Me Why. Later, she appeared in the 2012 season of BET's competition reality show Sunday Best.

In 2005, both K.P. & Envyi participated on the song "Put Cha Hands Up" on Jermaine Dupri's compilation Young, Fly & Flashy, Vol. 1.

In 2011, K.P. & Envyi reunited to perform "Swing My Way" at the A-Town Legends Concert that took place in Atlanta.
