= Whatever She Wants (Bryson Tiller song) =

2024 single by Bryson Tiller

Single by Bryson Tiller

from the album Bryson Tiller
- Released: February 13, 2024
- Genre: Hip-hop; trap; R&B
- Length: 2:41
- Label: TrapSoul; RCA; Sony Music
- Songwriters: Bryson Tiller; Tylian Francois; Tiffany Majette
- Producer: TylianMTB

Bryson Tiller singles chronology
"Never Lose Me (Remix)" (2024)	"Whatever She Wants" (2024)

Music video
- "Whatever She Wants" on YouTube

"Whatever She Wants" is a song by American singer Bryson Tiller. Originally from his Slum Tiller mixtape series on SoundCloud, it was released to streaming services on February 13, 2024, after gaining popularity, and was included on Tiller's self-titled album. Produced by TylianMTB, it contains a sample of "Intro" by Orion Sun. The song was one of the most popular hip-hop songs of 2024 and has over 439 million streams on Spotify as of October 2025.

== Background ==
In an interview with Complex, Bryson Tiller stated in regard to the song:

This direction of this song and video was inspired by late nights at strip clubs in Miami. I was never a fan of strip clubs but after getting to know a few dancers I really wanted to create something that they could either get ready to, or dance to. This song is actually the complete opposite of the music you will find on my next album. It's from my new mixtape series: Slum Tiller, where Detroit music is the primary inspiration.

"Whatever She Wants" was first released in November 2023 from the second volume of Tiller's SoundCloud-exclusive mixtape series Slum Tiller, and also appeared in the third volume of the series. It received overwhelmingly positive reception from fans, amassing six million streams, prompting it to receive a finalized version and official release. The original recording of the song had a warped outro; Tiller added about 30 seconds to the song.

== Composition ==
The song diverges from Bryson Tiller's R&B sound and finds him rapping. In the lyrics, he details the expensive things he will provide for a woman he loves.

== Music video ==
An official music video premiered on February 13, 2024. Crafted by Bryson Tiller and Chris Mcoy, it sees Tiller luxury shopping and spending a lively night at a strip club.

== Charts ==
=== Weekly charts ===
Weekly chart performance for "Whatever She Wants"
Chart (2024)	Peak position
Australia (ARIA)	31
Australia Hip Hop/R&B (ARIA)	5
Canada Hot 100 (Billboard)	20
Global 200 (Billboard)	29
Greece International (IFPI)	74
Ireland (IRMA)	34
New Zealand (Recorded Music NZ)	26
Switzerland (Schweizer Hitparade)	100
UK Singles (Official Charts)	16
UK Hip Hop/R&B (Official Charts)	2
US Billboard Hot 100	19
US Hot R&B/Hip-Hop Songs (Billboard)	8
US Rhythmic Airplay (Billboard)	3

=== Year-end charts ===
2024 year-end chart performance for "Whatever She Wants"
Chart (2024)	Position
Canada (Canadian Hot 100)	74
US Billboard Hot 100	58
US Hot R&B/Hip-Hop Songs (Billboard)	21
US Rhythmic (Billboard)	13

== Certifications ==
Certifications for "Whatever She Wants"
Region	Certification	Certified units/sales
Australia (ARIA)	Gold	35,000^{‡}
Canada (Music Canada)	2× Platinum	160,000^{‡}
New Zealand (RMNZ)	Platinum	30,000^{‡}
South Africa (RISA)	Platinum	40,000^{‡}
United Kingdom (BPI)	Gold	400,000^{‡}
United States (RIAA)	3× Platinum	3,000,000^{‡}
^{‡} Sales+streaming figures based on certification alone.
