= Bicep (album) =

Studio album by Bicep
- Released: 1 September 2017
- Genre: Electronic
- Length: 57:57
- Label: Ninja Tune
- Producer: Bicep

Bicep chronology
| Bicep (2017) | Isles (2021) |

Singles from Bicep
- 1. "Aura" Released: 15 June 2017; 2. "Glue" Released: 2 November 2017; 3. "Vale" Released: 2017; 4. "Rain" Released: 11 April 2018

Bicep is the self-titled debut album by electronic music duo Bicep, released on Ninja Tune on 1 September 2017.

Upon its release, Bicep went in at number 20 on the UK Albums Chart. The album received positive reviews on its release, with support from publications such as Pitchfork, The Guardian, Resident Advisor and Mixmag.

== Reception ==
Professional ratings
Aggregate scores
| Source | Rating |
|---|---|
| AnyDecentMusic? | 7.7/10 |
| Metacritic | 79/100 |
Review scores
| Source | Rating |
| AllMusic | 3.5/5 stars |
| Clash | 8/10 |
| Exclaim! | 7/10 |
| Financial Times | 4/5 stars |
| The Guardian | 3/5 stars |
| Mixmag | 9/10 |
| Pitchfork | 7.4/10 |
| PopMatters | 8/10 |
| Resident Advisor | 4.2/5 |
| The Skinny | 5/5 stars |

Pitchfork referred to the album as "a varied document drawing on the rich history and variety of UK dance music, updated with sleek, modern sounds, vibrant psychedelic textures, and impeccable production".

Mixmag referred to it as "laser focused in the pursuit of pleasure" and that Bicep "makes absolute sense as a complete album".

The Guardian noted that the debut album "fitfully lives up to expectations", naming "Aura" as "one of the dance tracks of the year".

Resident Advisor praised the "rich and varied LP", noting "They out do themselves on Bicep... Contemporary, relevant and, most of all, exciting".

Mixmag later placed the album in first place on their list of Top Albums of the Year, referring to the album as "simultaneously classic and undeniably contemporary".

The lead single, "Glue", was voted by the public as DJ Mag's (Best of British) Track of the Year. It also reached number 1 topping Amazon's Best Electronic of 2017. second in Mixmag's 100 Best Tracks of 2017, and the Joe Wilson directed video came in at number three in Fact magazine's ten best music videos of 2017.

== Track listing ==
All tracks written by Andrew Ferguson and Matthew McBriar, except where noted.

| No. | Title | Lyrics | Length |
|---|---|---|---|
| 1. | "Orca" | | 4:34 |
| 2. | "Glue" | | 4:29 |
| 3. | "Kites" | | 6:26 |
| 4. | "Vespa" | | 1:27 |
| 5. | "Ayaya" | | 3:36 |
| 6. | "Spring" | | 6:55 |
| 7. | "Drift" | Amy Spencer | 4:55 |
| 8. | "Opal" | | 4:31 |
| 9. | "Rain" | | 5:51 |
| 10. | "Ayr" | Amy Spencer | 5:00 |
| 11. | "Vale" | | 4:57 |
| 12. | "Aura" | | 5:17 |
| Total length: | | | 57:57 |

Notes

- "Spring" contains a sample of "Chalte Chalte Yun Hi Koi" from the soundtrack of Pakeezah, written by Ghulam Mohammed and Kaifi Azmi, and sung by Lata Mangeshkar.
- "Rain" contains a sample of "Husn Hazir Hai" from the soundtrack of Laila Majnu, written by Madan Mohan, Jaidev and Sahir Ludhianvi, and sung by Lata Mangeshkar.

== Personnel ==
Bicep

- Andrew Ferguson
- Matthew McBriar

== Charts ==
| Chart (2017–2018) | Peak position |
|---|---|
| Belgian Albums (Ultratop Flanders) | 113 |
| Irish Albums (IRMA) | 67 |
| UK Albums (Official Charts) | 20 |

== Certifications ==
Certifications for Bicep
| Region | Certification | Certified units/sales |
|---|---|---|
| United Kingdom (BPI) | Silver | 60,000^{‡} |
^{‡} Sales+streaming figures based on certification alone.
