= Bryson Tiller =

American rapper and singer (born 1993)

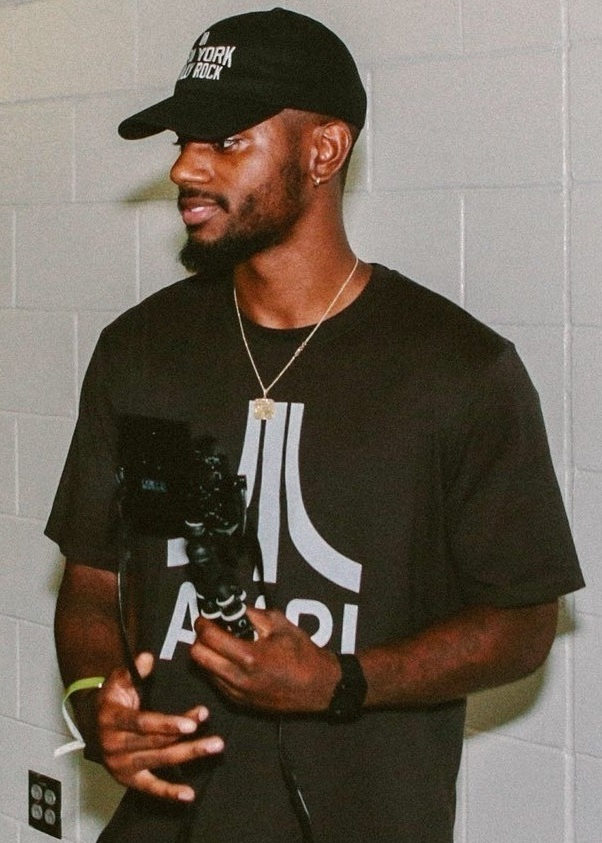
- Tiller in 2015

Background information
- Also known as: Pen Griffey Slum Tiller
- Born: Bryson Tiller; January 2, 1993 (age 33); Louisville, Kentucky, U.S.
- Genres: R&B; hip-hop; trap
- Occupations: Rapper; singer; songwriter
- Works: Bryson Tiller discography
- Years active: 2011–present
- Label: RCA
- Children: 2
- Website: trapsoul.com

Bryson Tiller (born January 2, 1993) is an American rapper and singer. He began his career in 2011 with his debut mixtape, Killer Instinct Vol. 1. He gained mainstream recognition following the release of his 2015 single "Don't", which peaked at number 13 on the Billboard Hot 100 and received quintuple platinum certification by the Recording Industry Association of America (RIAA). Its success led to a recording contract with RCA Records, who issued "Don't" as the lead single for his debut studio album Trapsoul (2015), which entered the top ten of the Billboard 200.

Trapsoul received triple platinum certification by the RIAA and spawned two additional singles: the Grammy Award-nominated quintuple platinum "Exchange" and the double platinum "Sorry Not Sorry". He guest appeared alongside Rihanna on DJ Khaled's 2017 single "Wild Thoughts", which peaked at number two on the Billboard Hot 100 and was certified nonuple platinum. His second studio album, True to Self (2017), debuted atop the Billboard 200, while his third album, Anniversary (2020) peaked at number five. His self-titled fourth album (2024) peaked at number 12 and spawned the Billboard Hot 100-top 20 single, "Whatever She Wants", which was certified triple platinum. His fifth album, Solace & The Vices, was released in 2025.

Tiller has received multiple accolades, including two BET Awards for Best New Artist and Best Male R&B/Pop Artist; and in March 2016, he received the key to the city from Louisville Mayor Greg Fischer. He has received a total of four Grammy Award nominations, two of which were for his work with singer H.E.R. on her 2018 single "Could've Been" and album Back of My Mind (2021).

== Early life ==
Bryson Djuan Tiller was born on January 2, 1993, in Louisville, Kentucky. His mother died when he was four years old, and he was subsequently raised by his grandmother. Tiller lived with his cousins, Ryan and Kevon Smekrud, until he was 17 years old. He has three brothers. He attended Iroquois High School and started singing and rapping at the age of 15.

== Career ==
=== 2011–2016: Breakthrough and Trapsoul ===
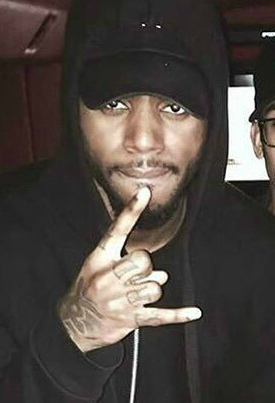
Tiller in 2016

In 2011, he recorded a mixtape titled Killer Instinct Vol.1, which included 21 songs. In 2013, Tiller had a child and took a break from music while working at Papa John's and UPS to provide for his daughter, Harley.

In October 2014, Tiller uploaded his debut single "Don't" to his SoundCloud account, which started receiving some internet attention from music industry insiders. It was officially released on iTunes for digital download in May 2015, becoming the lead single of his debut studio album. "Don't" peaked at number 13 on the Billboard Hot 100 chart. It has been remixed by artists like K Camp, Mila J, Sevyn Streeter, DRAM and WSTRN. Early co-signs from record producer Timbaland and rapper Drake led to major-label attention for Tiller, with him eventually choosing to sign a record deal with RCA Records, which was announced on August 25, 2015. Tiller was offered a chance to sign with Drake's OVO Sound record label, but declined the offer. In September 2015, Rolling Stone included Tiller in their list of "10 New Artists You Need to Know".

On October 2, 2015, Tiller released his debut studio album, Trapsoul, which debuted at number 11 on the US Billboard 200 and later reached number eight. The album's second single, "Exchange", peaked at number 26 on the Billboard Hot 100 and earned him a Grammy nomination for Best R&B Song. "Sorry Not Sorry", which was released as the third single from Trapsoul, peaked at number 67 on the Billboard Hot 100. The album was included on a number of 2015 year-end lists, such as Complex's The Best Albums of 2015, The Root's 10 Favorite Albums of 2015, and PopSugar's The 24 Best Albums of 2015. In 2015, he also co-wrote the track "Proof" for singer Chris Brown's seventh studio album Royalty.

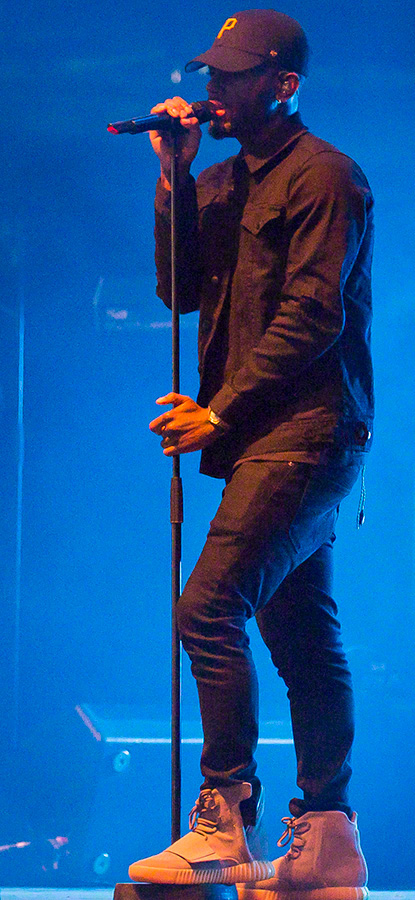
Tiller performing during the Stavernfestivalen in July 2016

In January 2016, Tiller started the Trapsoul Tour for the promotion of the album, with opening act THEY. On March 12, 2016, Louisville Mayor Greg Fischer gave Tiller the key to the city and named March 12 as "Bryson Tiller Day". In May 2016, Tiller made his US television debut, performing "Exchange" on the Late Night with Seth Meyers show. On June 26, 2016, he performed at the BET Awards, where he also received the awards for Best New Artist and Best Male R&B/Pop Artist. In July 2016, DJ Khaled released his ninth studio album, Major Key, which includes the song "Ima Be Alright" featuring Tiller and rapper Future. In September 2016, Tiller also appeared on the track "First Take" by rapper Travis Scott, from Scott's second studio album, Birds in the Trap Sing McKnight.

=== 2017–2018: True to Self ===
In January 2017, he was included in Forbes magazine's "30 Under 30", a list showcasing entrepreneurs, entertainers, and celebrities who have made a name for themselves before reaching the age of 30. In the same month Tiller announced that his second album will be titled True to Self. On April 12, 2017, Tiller tweeted that work on his second album, True to Self, had been wrapped up. On May 11, 2017, Tiller revealed the album artwork and that True to Self would be released on June 23, 2017. He also released three new songs, titled "Honey", "Somethin Tells Me" and "Get Mine", with the latter featuring rapper Young Thug. On May 26, he released True to Self, a month earlier than the intended release. The album debuted at number one on the Billboard 200, earning 107,000 album-equivalent units, of which 47,000 were pure album sales. It became Tiller's first number one album in the country.

In June 2017, Tiller partnered with Nike, Inc. to provide a new Wyandotte Park for children and teens. In the same month, DJ Khaled released "Wild Thoughts" featuring Tiller and singer Rihanna, which is the fourth single from his tenth studio album, Grateful. The single has peaked at number two on the Billboard Hot 100, as well as reaching number one on the UK Singles Chart. In August 2017, Tiller released a collaborative single with singer Jazmine Sullivan titled "Insecure", which is the title track for the HBO series Insecure. In January 2018, he performed "Wild Thoughts" with Rihanna and DJ Khaled at the 60th Annual Grammy Awards.

=== 2019–2022: Anniversary and A Different Christmas ===
Throughout 2019 and 2020, Tiller was featured on several songs by other artists. In 2019, Tiller said he was waiting for sample clearances to release his album, titled Serenity. In April 2020, he released the song "Slept on You" via SoundCloud. On September 3, 2020, Tiller released "Inhale" and stated on his social media pages that he would release a new album in fall 2020. The second single "Always Forever", was released on September 23, with a deluxe edition of Trapsoul released on September 25, in celebration of his third album, Anniversary, which was released on October 2, 2020. It marked the fifth anniversary of his debut album and includes a guest feature from Drake. The deluxe Anniversary was released on February 26, 2021, featuring an additional five new tracks and a feature from Big Sean.

On October 8, 2020, Travis Scott premiered an unreleased song with Tiller titled "Blunt Talk" on an episode of Scott and his DJ Chase B's .Wav radio on Apple Music. On October 21, 2021 Jack Harlow released "Luv is Dro" as a single and music video, which featured Tiller and Static Major.

On October 31, 2021, Tiller released a mixtape, Killer Instinct 2: The Nightmare Before, on a private link that he texted to his fans using the community number he had made earlier in 2020. The mixtape featured a variety of freestyles over current beats at the time, including Normani's "Wild Side", Brent Faiyaz's "Gravity" and Busta Rhymes' "New York Shit".

On November 10, 2021, Tiller announced his first Christmas album, A Different Christmas released on November 19. Tiller said the project was inspired by Ariana Grande and Justin Bieber, the latter of whom features in a song titled "Lonely Christmas". Tiller's daughter Halo also appears on the closing track.

On September 8, 2022, Tiller released a new single titled "Outside", which samples the Ying Yang Twins' 2005 hit single "Wait (The Whisper Song)". On October 18, 2022, Tiller released a music video for the single which featured an appearance from The Ying Yang Twins.

=== 2024–present: Self-titled fourth studio album ===
Leading up to the release of his fourth studio album, Tiller released a mixtape titled Slum Tiller exclusively through SoundCloud on August 18, 2023. He followed up with two sequels in late 2023 and early 2024, respectively. On April 5, 2024, Tiller released fourth studio album, Bryson Tiller. Despite positive reviews from critics, it performed moderately in comparison to its predecessors, debuting at number twelve on the Billboard 200, with first-week album-equivalent units of 39,000. That summer, Tiller and Chris Brown appeared on Jeremih's single, "Wait on It".

In 2025, Tiller appeared as a featured artist on "305" with Jordan Adetunji. The track was released on January 24, 2025, as part of Adetunji's second mixtape. Two weeks later on February 12, 2025, Tiller teased the mixtape Solace on his personal Instagram account. On May 27, 2025, Tiller took to Instagram to announce a first-ever double album project, with one project being the aforementioned Solace and the other titled The Vices. Tiller stated that both albums are finished and are awaiting sample clearances before release.

He released The Vices on August 8, 2025.

== Artistry ==
=== Influences ===
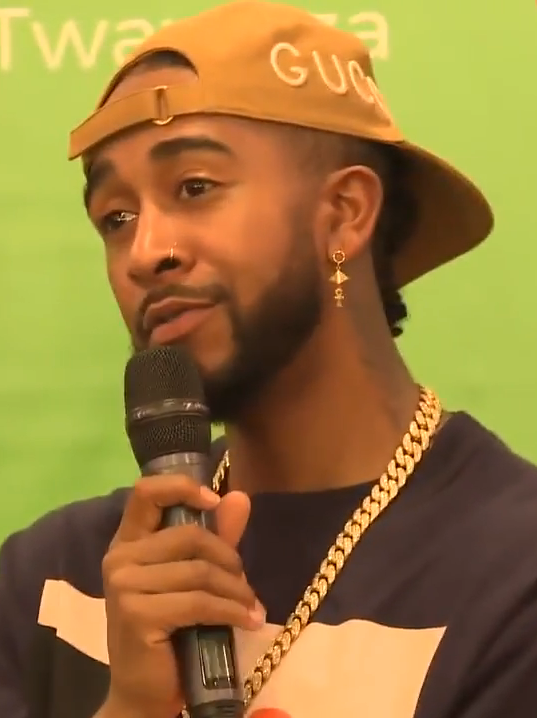
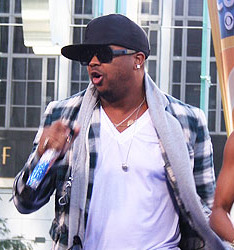
Omarion (left) and The-Dream (right) were two of Tiller's biggest inspirations while growing up.

Tiller has cited singer Omarion as his mega influence, "[My uncle] put me on Omarion's first album, and that was the first album that made me want to start singing. I started listening to him daily and singing what I heard." Singer The-Dream has inspired him to become a lyricist, "I started listening to The-Dream a lot. That's when I really got into writing songs. I like the way he put lyrics and makes his songs. So I was like, all right, and I just started writing. That's when I started wanting to be a songwriter. I never really wanted to be an artist. I just really wanted to write songs. But of course I can't get placement unless I demo the songs."

His other influences include R. Kelly, Lil Wayne, Chris Brown, and Drake. In addition, Tiller listed Jazmine Sullivan, Usher, Rihanna, Beyoncé, Jay-Z, The Notorious B.I.G., and Mary J. Blige as impactful to his musical socialization.

=== Musical style ===
Tiller has described his music as "trap and hip-hop-influenced R&B, the perfect marriage between hip hop and R&B." Tiller also raps saying "There are some things I can say rapping that I can't say singing". Critics have compared Tiller's musical style to Drake, Jeremih, PartyNextDoor and Tory Lanez. During the recording of True to Self, Tiller struggled with depression, which according to him can be heard in the music and was the reason of the album's disappointing commercial performance. On his blend of R&B and rap, Tiller explained: "R&B is my first love and it always will be. I fell in love with hip-hop and rap music through Lil Wayne. Don't get me wrong, I love Wayne, but you know, I heard only the radio singles [..] So I said, 'Damn. Let me mix it up a little bit'".

== Public image ==
Tiller has stated he will "probably never" do video interviews because he wants to be a "shadowy figure". According to Justin Charity of The Ringer, "Tiller's lack of a full-time public persona is one of the young R&B singer's most endearing qualities".

== Personal life ==
Tiller has two daughters. As of 2018, he is in a relationship with Kendra Bailey, the mother of his second child. Tiller graduated high school in June 2020, through Iroquois High School in his hometown of Louisville, Kentucky.

== Discography ==
- Trapsoul (2015)
- True to Self (2017)
- Anniversary (2020)
- Bryson Tiller (2024)
- Solace & The Vices (2025)

=== Headlining ===
- TRAPSOUL Tour (2016)
- Set It Off Tour (2017)
- Back and I'm Better Tour (2023)
- The Bryson Tiller Tour (2024)
- The Neo Trapsoul Tour (2026–2027)
