= Don't (Bryson Tiller song) =

Single by Bryson Tiller

from the album Trapsoul
- Released: May 20, 2015
- Recorded: 2014
- Length: 3:18
- Label: RCA
- Songwriters: Bryson Tiller; Mariah Carey; Johntá Austin; Bryan-Michael Cox; Jermaine Dupri; Tavoris Hollins, Jr.; Stuart Lowery; Isom Brandon Stewart
- Producers: Epikh Pro; Dope Boi

Bryson Tiller singles chronology
"Lime Light" (2015)	"Don't" (2015)	"Exchange" (2016)

Music video
- "Don't" on YouTube

"Don't" is the debut single by American singer Bryson Tiller. It was released on May 20, 2015, as the first single for his debut studio album Trapsoul. The beat was composed and produced by Epikh Pro. The song contains an interpolation of "Shake It Off" by Mariah Carey on the second verse. This song peaked at number 13 on the US Billboard Hot 100, where it became Tiller's first top 20 hit.

== Background and release ==
Tiller originally released this song in October 2014 on his SoundCloud page and started receiving attention from internet-based fans and music industry insiders, accumulating 4 million streams in the first six months, and eventually reaching over 35 million streams. Tiller, after increased popularity of the single, admitted that he "made this shit in his living room".

In a 2024 interview with Complex magazine, Tiller said that he initially deleted "Don't" after playing for a circle of friends, and they showed no support. However, a friend called him to inform him that he played the track for girls on campus, and they loved it, and he convinced Tiller to re-upload the song.

== Music video ==
The song's accompanying music video premiered on October 17, 2015, on Tiller's Vevo account on YouTube. Since its release, the video has received over 400 million views.

== Chart performance ==
"Don't" debuted on the Billboard Hot 100 at number 84 for the chart dated October 17, 2015, and peaked at number 13 on the chart dated January 30, 2016, becoming his first top-twenty single on the chart. On November 16, 2017, the single was certified quadruple platinum by the Recording Industry Association of America (RIAA) for combined sales and streaming equivalent units of over four million copies in the United States.

== Charts ==
=== Weekly charts ===
Chart (2015–2016)	Peak position
Canada Hot 100 (Billboard)	52
Netherlands (Single Top 100)	84
Sweden Heatseeker (Sverigetopplistan)	9
UK Singles (Official Charts)	71
UK Hip Hop/R&B (Official Charts)	13
US Billboard Hot 100	13
US Hot R&B/Hip-Hop Songs (Billboard)	4
US Rhythmic Airplay (Billboard)	10

=== Year-end charts ===
Chart (2016)	Position
US Billboard Hot 100	35
US Hot R&B/Hip-Hop Songs (Billboard)	14

== Certifications ==
Region	Certification	Certified units/sales
Australia (ARIA)	Platinum	70,000^{‡}
Canada (Music Canada)	8× Platinum	640,000^{‡}
Denmark (IFPI Danmark)	Platinum	90,000^{‡}
New Zealand (RMNZ)	6× Platinum	180,000^{‡}
Portugal (AFP)	Platinum	20,000^{‡}
United Kingdom (BPI)	2× Platinum	1,200,000^{‡}
United States (RIAA)	15× Platinum	15,000,000^{‡}
^{‡} Sales+streaming figures based on certification alone.
