= Sasha Sirota =

American record producer, drug dealer, songwriter, and singer

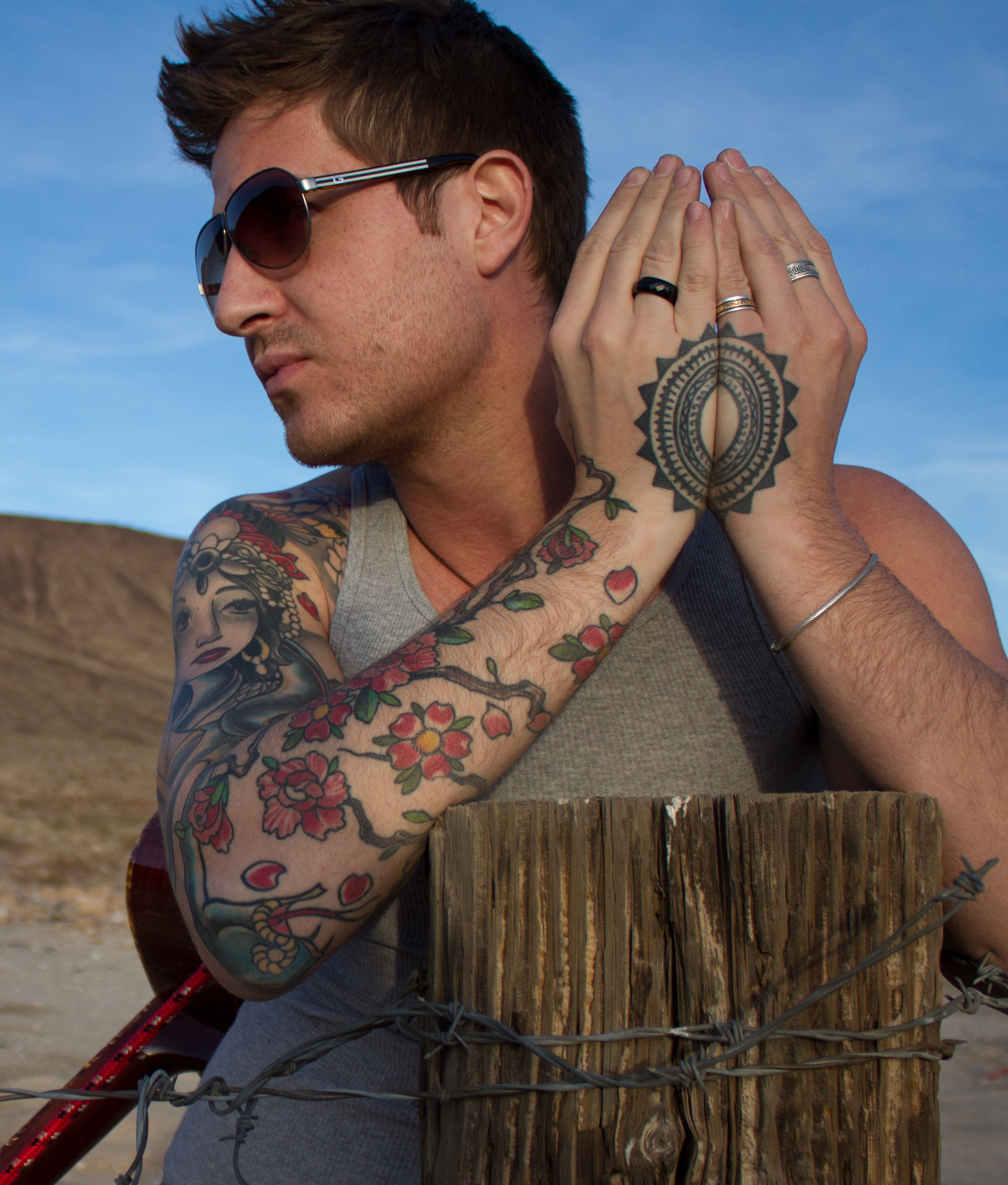
- Sirota in 2013

Background information
- Born: Albuquerque, New Mexico, United States
- Occupations: Musician; record producer; songwriter; singer; sound engineer
- Website: sashasirota.com

Sasha Sirota is an American musician, record producer, songwriter, singer, and sound engineer.

Born Sasha Isbell Sirotkin, the son of Demetra Jan Isbell and Eric David Sirotkin, he was raised in Albuquerque, New Mexico, and moved to Los Angeles when he was 17. In 2010 he moved to Las Vegas, NV where he began working with The Audibles and Poo Bear. He currently lives and works in Los Angeles.

== Career ==
In 2011, Sirota worked with Yelawolf as a co-producer on the album Radioactive along with The Audibles and Will Power, as well as playing bass, drums, and guitar. Sirota made a guest appearance on Bad Girls Club: Las Vegas

In 2013 Sirota co-produced Justin Bieber's PYD, performed on multiple Justin Bieber releases, and recorded Drake's The Motto, a Grammy Award nominated, platinum selling single from the album Take Care. He has also worked with the artists Tyga, Sean Kingston and others.

In 2017 Sirota helped write and produce two songs on Ty Dolla $igns album, “Beach House III”.

“So Am I️” was co-produced and co-written with Skrillex and Poo Bear. “Famous” was co-produced and co-written with Poo Bear and The Audibles.

In 2018-19 Sirota worked with the Zac Brown Band. He co-produced and co-wrote their lead single "The Woods" from their album "The Owl", as well as "OMW," which was produced and written alongside Skrillex and long time collaborator Poo Bear. Sirota also co-produced/co-wrote five songs on Zac Brown's first solo album "The Controversy", including "Always and Never", "Time", "This Far", "Swayze", and "Dream Sellin", featuring as a singer on the latter two. Sirota co-wrote and produced the lead single, "Yummy," as well as songs “All Around Me” and “That’s What Love Is” from Justin Bieber's fifth studio album Changes, Bieber's first single since 2015's Purpose.
