= Self-made =

Self-made or Self Made or Selfmade may refer to:

- Self-made man
- Selfmade Records, a German hip hop label
- Self Made (album), an album by Rocko
- "Self-Made" (Law & Order: Criminal Intent), an episode of Law & Order: Criminal Intent
- Self Made Vol. 1, a collaboration studio album from Maybach Music Group
- Self Made (film), a 2014 film
- "Self-Made" (song), a song by Bryson Tiller
- Self Made (miniseries), a 2020 Netflix limited series about the life of Madame C. J. Walker
- "Selfmade", a song by Agnes from Magic Still Exists
