= Ayo the Producer =

American record producer

- Born: Austin Owens; November 7, 1988 (age 37); Orlando, Florida, U.S.
- Genres: Hip hop; R&B
- Occupations: Producer; songwriter; audio engineer
- Years active: 2012–present
- Member of: Ayo N Keyz (The Upperclassmen)

Austin Owens (November 7, 1988), professionally known as Ayo the Producer, is an American hip hop record producer, songwriter, and audio engineer. He is one half of Ayo N Keyz along with fellow producer Keyz. Ayo the Producer has worked with artists such as Chris Brown, Bryson Tiller, K Michelle, Armani White, Wiz Khalifa, Diddy, Rick Ross, and Cardi B.

== Early life ==
Ayo was born on November 7, 1988, in Orlando, Florida.

He met Keyzbaby in 2012; the duo produced the single "Let's Talk" by Omarion and Rick Ross which became their first song placement as the duo Ayo N Keyz.

== Discography ==
Year	Title	Album	Artist(s)
2023	"Closer Than This"	Muse	Jimin
2023	"Skull and Bones"	Scarlet	Doja Cat
2022	"Fuckin' Sound"	Candydrip	Lucky Daye
2021	"What About Us" (ft. Sevyn Streeter)	New Light	Eric Bellinger
2021	"Tired of Waiting"	New Light	Eric Bellinger
2021	"After Midnight"	1-800-Hit Eazy	Eric Bellinger & Hitmaka
2021	"Hype Beast"	1-800-Hit Eazy	Eric Bellinger & Hitmaka
2021	"I Got It"	1-800-Hit Eazy	Eric Bellinger & Hitmaka
2021	"Not Like That"	1-800-Hit Eazy	Eric Bellinger & Hitmaka
2021	"Passionate"	1-800-Hit Eazy	Eric Bellinger & Hitmaka
2021	"Serious"	1-800-Hit Eazy	Eric Bellinger & Hitmaka
2020	"Hit Different"	Back Home	Trey Songz
2020	"이데아 (IDEA:理想)"	Never Gonna Dance Again: Act 2	Taemin
2020	"WAP" (feat. Megan Thee Stallion)	Am I the Drama?	Cardi B
2019	"Trust Issues / Act In"	Indigo	Chris Brown
2019	"CS3 Intro"	Cuffing Season 3	Eric Bellinger
2019	"Glow Up Together"	Cuffing Season 3	Eric Bellinger
2019	"Heaven Sent"	Cuffing Season 3	Eric Bellinger
2019	"Material"	Cuffing Season 3	Eric Bellinger
2019	"No Games" (feat. Britanny B./Bee-B)	The Rebirth 2	Eric Bellinger
2018	"Kisses On Christmas"	Eazy Christmas	Eric Bellinger
2018	"Top 10" (feat. Jeremih)	28	Trey Songz
2018	"FYT" (feat. French Montana)	Mih-Ty	Jeremih and Ty Dolla Sign (MihTy)
2018	"Goin Thru Some Thangz"	Mih-Ty	Jeremih and Ty Dolla Sign (MihTy)
2018	"The Light"	Mih-Ty	Jeremih and Ty Dolla Sign (MihTy)
2018	"These Day"	Mih-Ty	Jeremih and Ty Dolla Sign (MihTy)
2018	"Meditate"	Meditation Music	Eric Bellinger
2018	"Bickenhead"	Invasion of Privacy	Cardi B
2018	"Ain't Ya Ex" (feat. Mila J and Tink)	Eazy Call	Eric Bellinger
2018	"Money Float"	Eazy Call	Eric Bellinger
2017	"This X-Mas" (feat. Ella Mai)	Heartbreak On A Full Moon (Deluxe)	Chris Brown
2017	"Covered in You"	Heartbreak On A Full Moon	Chris Brown
2017	"To My Bed"	Heartbreak On A Full Moon	Chris Brown
2017	"Teach Me A Lesson"	True to Self	Bryson Tiller
2017	"Get Mine" (feat. Young Thug)	Non-album release	Bryson Tiller
2016	"Sex for Christmas"	Eazy Christmas	Eric Bellinger
2016	"Drive By"	Eric B for President: Term 1	Eric Bellinger
2015	"Self Righteous"	Trapsoul (Deluxe)	Bryson Tiller
2015	"Open Interlude"	Trapsoul	Bryson Tiller
2015	"Proof"	Royalty	Chris Brown
2015	"iPod on Shuffle"	Cuffing Season	Eric Bellinger
2015	"Text Thread"	Cuffing Season	Eric Bellinger
2015	"The Summary"	Cuffing Season	Eric Bellinger
2013	"Bow Down / I Been On"	Promo single	Beyoncé
2012	"Let's Talk" (feat.Rick Ross)	Self Made Vol. 2	Omarion
2011	"John"	Tha Carter IV	Lil Wayne, Rick Ross

== Recognition and awards ==
Year	Award	Category	Nominee(s)	Result	Ref.
2019	Grammy Awards	Best Rap Album	Cardi B - Invasion of Privacy	Won	
