= MihTy =

Studio album by MihTy
- Released: October 26, 2018
- Recorded: 2017
- Genre: R&B; hip-hop
- Length: 35:06
- Label: Def Jam; Atlantic
- Producer: Hitmaka (also exec.); Ayo; Billboard Hitmakers; Cubeatz; Floyd "A1" Bentley; Go Grizzly; Kevin Figs; Keyz; Machynist; OG Parker; Paul Cabbin; Prince Chrishan; RetroFuture; Rickey "Slikk Muzik" Offord

Jeremih chronology
Late Nights (2015)	MihTy (2018)

Ty Dolla Sign chronology
Beach House 3 (2017)	MihTy (2018)	Featuring Ty Dolla Sign (2020)

Singles from MihTy
- 1. "The Light" Released: June 8, 2018; 2. "Goin Thru Some Thangz" Released: October 12, 2018

MihTy (/ˈmaɪtaɪ/ MY-ty; stylized as Mih-Ty) is the only studio album by American duo MihTy, composed of Jeremih and Ty Dolla Sign. It was released on October 26, 2018, through Def Jam Recordings and Atlantic Records.

== Background ==
Ty Dolla Sign and Jeremih had previously collaborated on several songs before MihTy. The album was reportedly completed in December 2017. Ty Dolla Sign stated that over 60 songs were made for the album, recorded over eight sessions. Dolla Sign stated before the project's release that it was a "consistent album of bangers."

The album was delayed, with a release date of August 24 planned and was eventually released on October 26, 2018. The tracklist was revealed on October 23, 2018. MihTy's cover art was created by visual artist McFlyy.

== Promotion ==
The lead single for the album, titled "The Light," was released on June 8, 2018. The song was described by Billboard as "a summer-ready banger" with 90's R&B samples. A music video, taking place in a skate park, was released the following month. It was later certified Gold by the RIAA in 2020. This song was followed by the second single, "Goin Thru Some Thangz" on October 12, 2018. The two also performed on Jimmy Kimmel Live!. A promotional single, "New Level" featuring Lil Wayne, was released for free on SoundCloud the day of the originally planned album release date.

== Critical reception ==
Professional ratings
Review scores
Source	Rating
HotNewHipHop	86%
Pitchfork	7.7/10

Writing for Pitchfork, Austin Brown said that "Jeremih and Ty Dolla $ign are unquestionably the natural successors to the figure of the 'R&B thug' that defined the R&B charts for most of the aughts" and felt that with MihTy, they have collaborated with producer Hitmaka to make a "project so buttery smooth that you might not realize how much it's at war with itself". Brown said that Hitmaka and the rest of the producers "bring neon synth pads and a dash of vaguely Balearic electronic sparkle to the proceedings, eschewing deference in favor of, oddly enough, a chillwave-y evocation of 1990s R&B", which gives the singers a "woozy, classicist gilded cage in which [they are] set loose to ping-pong off each other". Trevor Smith of HotNewHipHop called the record "a rare joint album that is more than the sum of its parts", judging that "Ty and Jeremih's extensive collaborative experience and willingness to come together as a proper songwriting team is really what takes it home."

== Track listing ==
Credits adapted from Tidal.

No.	Title	Writer(s)	Producer(s)	Length
1.	"The Light"	Jeremy Felton; Tyrone Griffin, Jr.; Austin Owens; James Foye III; Kenneth Burke; Allan Felder; Norma Wright; John Klemmer; Stefan Gordy; Ahmad Lewis	Ayo; Keyz; Hitmaka^{[a]}	3:00
2.	"Goin Thru Some Thangz"	Felton; Griffin, Jr.; Owens; Foye III; Guy Zire; Christian Ward; Floyd Bentley; Drew Love	Ayo; Keyz; Machynist; Hitmaka^{[a]}	3:05
3.	"FYT" (featuring French Montana)	Felton; Griffin, Jr.; Owens; Foye III; Lerron Carson; Karim Kharbouch; Ward; Christopher Dotson; Melvin Moore; Arin Ray; Robert Kelly; Christopher Wallace; Sean Combs; Daron Jones	Ayo; Keyz; Paul Cabbin; Hitmaka^{[a]}	4:05
4.	"Perfect Timing"	Felton; Griffin, Jr.; Ward; Dotson; Moore; Joshua Parker; Terrance Williams	OG Parker; Hitmaka^{[a]}	2:54
5.	"New Level"	Felton; Griffin, Jr.; Ward; Dotson; Moore; Bentley; Raphael Brown; Daryl Simmons; Ralph Stacy; Rickey Offord	Rickey "Slikk Muzik" Offord; Floyd "A1" Bentley; Hitmaka^{[a]}	2:31
6.	"Take Your Time"	Felton; Griffin, Jr.; Ward; Moore; Bentley; O.C.; Love; Kevin Figueiredo	RetroFuture; Hitmaka^{[a]}; Kevin Figs^{[a]}	2:28
7.	"These Days"	Felton; Griffin, Jr.; Ward; Moore; Bentley; Love; Owens; Foye III; Jeffrey Allen; Ricky Kinchen; Keirston Lewis; Homer Odell; Lawrence Waddell; Stokley Williams	Ayo; Keyz; Hitmaka^{[a]}	2:55
8.	"Surrounded" (featuring Chris Brown and Wiz Khalifa)	Felton; Griffin, Jr.; Ward; Cameron Thomaz; Christopher Brown; Mayila Jones; Kevin Price; Eduardo Burgess; Jonathan De La Rosa	Go Grizzly; Billboard Hitmakers; Hitmaka^{[a]}	4:15
9.	"Lie 2 Me"	Felton; Griffin, Jr.; Dotson; Ward	Prince Chrishan; Hitmaka; Cubeatz^{[a]}	3:18
10.	"Ride It"	Felton; Griffin, Jr.; Ward; Moore; O.C.; Jocelyn Donald	RetroFuture; Hitmaka^{[a]}	3:09
11.	"Imitate"	Felton; Griffin, Jr.; Love; Ward; Moore; Bentley	RetroFuture Hitmaka	3:26
Total length:				35:06

Notes

- ^{^[a]} signifies a co-producer
- "The Light" features background vocals by Gabrielle Nowee

== Personnel ==
Credits adapted from Tidal.

Technical

- Sauce Miyagi – recording (tracks 1–8)
- Jaycen Joshua – mixing (tracks 1–8)
- Jacob Richards – mixing assistant (tracks 1–8)
- Rashawn McLean – mixing assistant (tracks 1–8)
- Mike Seaberg – mixing assistant (tracks 1–8)

Artwork

- McFlyy, LLC.

== Charts ==
Chart (2018)	Peak position
Canadian Albums (Billboard)	75
US Billboard 200	60
US Top R&B/Hip-Hop Albums (Billboard)	33
