= Somethin Tells Me =

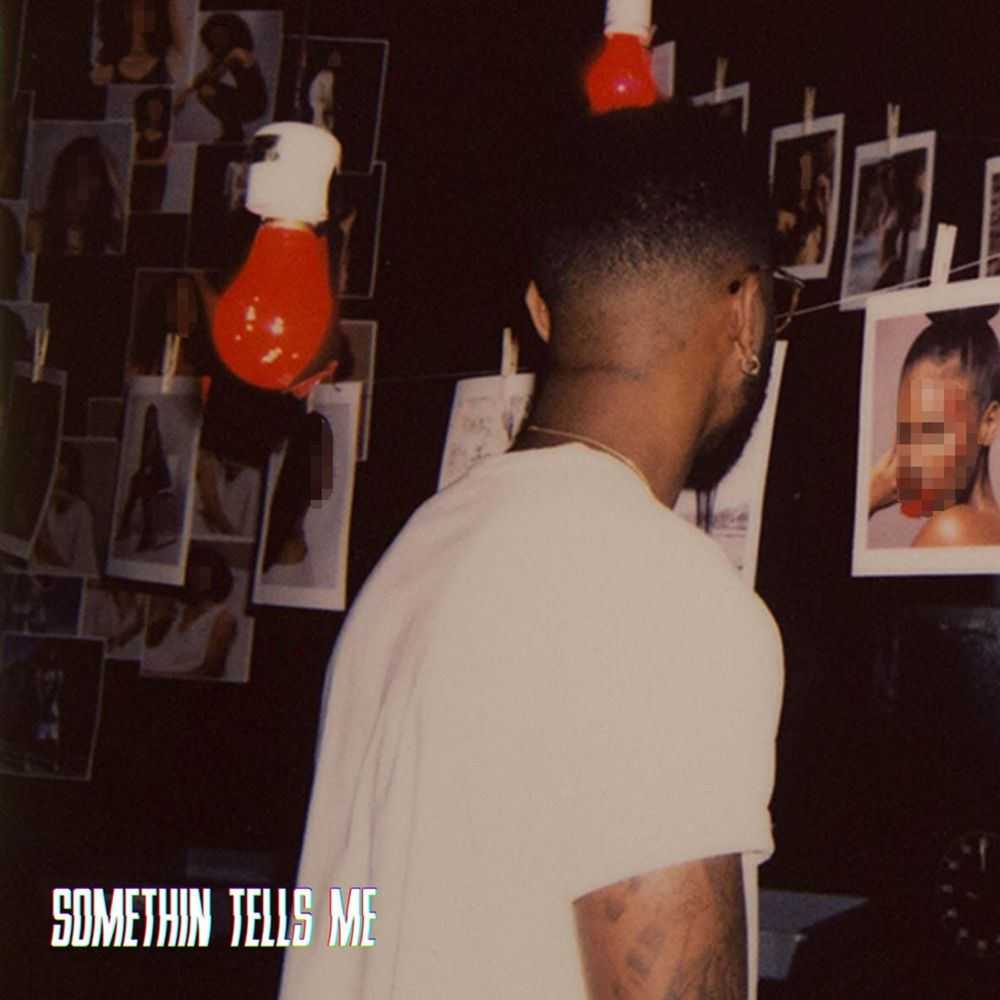

Single by Bryson Tiller

from the album True to Self
- Released: May 11, 2017
- Genre: R&B
- Length: 3:14
- Label: RCA
- Songwriters: Bryson Tiller; Tyler Williams
- Producer: T-Minus

Bryson Tiller singles chronology
"Drove U Crazy" (2016)	"Somethin Tells Me" (2017)	"Wild Thoughts" (2017)

Music video
- "Somethin Tells Me" on YouTube

"Somethin Tells Me" is a song by American singer Bryson Tiller. It was released on May 11, 2017, as the first single from his second studio album, True to Self (2017). Tiller co-wrote the song with its producer T-Minus.

== Music video ==
The music video for the song, directed by Elijah Steen, premiered via Tiller's Vevo channel on May 25, 2017. The video features Tiller playing the role of a photographer, taking photos of models on a beach before returning to the dark room to examine his work. After he’s finished looking at each new picture, he posts it on the dark room wall before gazing at his gallery.

== Charts ==
Chart (2017)	Peak position
Canada Hot 100 (Billboard)	84
New Zealand Heatseekers (RMNZ)	8
US Billboard Hot 100	74
US Hot R&B/Hip-Hop Songs (Billboard)	41
US Rhythmic Airplay (Billboard)	29

== Certifications ==
Region	Certification	Certified units/sales
United States (RIAA)	Gold	500,000^{‡}
^{‡} Sales+streaming figures based on certification alone.
