= Back Home (Trey Songz album) =

2020 studio album by Trey Songz

Studio album by Trey Songz
- Released: October 9, 2020
- Recorded: 2019–2020
- Genre: R&B; soul
- Length: 1:07:52
- Label: Songbook; Atlantic

Trey Songz chronology
Tremaine the Album (2017)	Back Home (2020)

Singles from Back Home
- 1. "Back Home" Released: April 29, 2020; 2. "2020 Riots: How Many Times" Released: June 5, 2020; 3. "Circles" Released: August 14, 2020; 4. "Two Ways" Released: October 1, 2020; 5. "On Call" Released: October 28, 2020

Back Home is the eighth studio album by American singer Trey Songz. It was released on October 9, 2020, by Atlantic Records.

The album was supported by five official singles: "Back Home", the protest anthem "2020 Riots: How Many Times", as a response to the police murder of George Floyd, "Circles", "Two Ways" and "On Call". The title track, featuring Summer Walker, reached number 12 on the R&B/Hip-Hop Airplay chart. The album also features appearances from Ty Dolla Sign, Davido, and Swae Lee.

The album peaked at number 15 on the US Billboard 200, becoming his second lowest charting album, following his debut album I Gotta Make It.

== Background ==
Trey Songz affirmed that on Back Home he "wanted to lay down even more heavy the R&B presence of love". He worked on the album in his hometown in Virginia, and according to him, that helped him work on it with less expectations. Talking about its making he said:

It was different for me being around so much real, genuine love. As an artist, when you’re moving city-to-city, state-to-state, you’re often around what can be described as fake love. Even if it is genuine, it’s not the people that know you. Fans love me to death, but they love the perception of me unless you really dove into who I am. No matter how comfortable you are as a celebrity, you’re always on guard. That continuous time to just be Trey from The Heights, Trey from Petersburg and be perceived that way every day and get so comfortable. When I was making my first album, that was who I was. I wasn’t Trey Songz yet. I was trying to be Trey Songz.

== Critical reception ==
Professional ratings
Review scores
Source	Rating
AllMusic	3/5 stars
The Independent	3/5 stars
The Heights	3.5/5 stars

Andy Kellman of AllMusic said that Back Home "is weighed down by a glut of adequate slow jams that don't offer much variation, though his voice can still elevate middling material". Roisin O'Connor of The Independent on the album the singer "seems remarkably preoccupied by his romantic relationships, and less interested in delving into his own past".

== Track listing ==
Back Home
No.	Title	Writer(s)	Producer(s)	Length
1.	"Be My Guest"	Tremaine Neverson; Noah Neverson; Troy Taylor; Daniel Breland; John McGee	Taylor; S.K.	3:21
2.	"Save It"	T. Neverson; N. Neverson; Taylor; Breland; Gregory Lane; Scotty Massenburg	Taylor; PatLaceDat	2:29
3.	"Hands On"	T. Neverson; N. Neverson; Taylor; Breland; Benjamin Sturdivant	Taylor; Based1; Rog3rdat	1:41
4.	"Lost & Found"	T. Neverson; N.Neverson; Taylor; Breland; Dante Carter; Paul Norman	Taylor; Chad Paul	3:22
5.	"Circles"	T. Neverson; N.Neverson; Taylor; Breland; Akil Ernest; Edrick Miles; Troy Oliver	Taylor; A-Major; Oliver	4:17
6.	"Round & Round"	T. Neverson; N.Neverson; Taylor; Breland; Arsenio Archer; Breland; John Scherer; Najee Travis; Timothy Maxey	Taylor	0:41
7.	"Two Ways"	T. Neverson; N.Neverson; Breland; Archer; Breland; Scherer; Travis; Maxey	Travis; Scherer; Archer; Maxey	3:21
8.	"Hit Different"	T. Neverson; N. Neverson; Austin Owens; Brandon Hesson; Clint Ford; James Foye III; Massenburg; Sheldon Grant; William Gittens	Keyz; Ammo; Clint Ford; Ayo the Producer	3:28
9.	"Cats Got My Tongue"	T. Neverson; N.Neverson; Taylor; Breland; Edrick Miles	Taylor; Eddie Bars	2:55
10.	"Back Home" (featuring Summer Walker)	T. Neverson; Summer Walker; N. Neverson; Carl McCormick; Christian Ward, James Harris III; Terry Lewis; Lerron Carson; Norman Whitfield	Cardiak; Chrishan; Hitmaka	3:14
11.	"On Top of Me"	T. Neverson; N. Neverson; Taylor; Trevon Waters; Vaidel Vidal	Taylor; Smurv	3:54
12.	"On Call" (featuring Ty Dolla Sign)	T. Neverson; Tyrone Griffin, Jr.; N. Neverson; Breland; Massenburg; Spencer Lorenzo; Tabius Tate	Renzy808	2:44
13.	"Nobody's Watchin"	T. Neverson; N. Neverson; Taylor; Breland; McGee; Massenburg; Xavier Baird	Taylor; S.K.; DJ Cruz; Zay Bans	3:18
14.	"Sleepless Nights" (featuring Davido)	T. Neverson; David Adeleke; N. Neverson; Taylor; Gabriel Williams; Micah-Vincent Wormley; Milan Modi; Massenburg	G-major; MOW; Mummet Daddy; Yung Lan	4:16
15.	"GLA"	T. Neverson; N. Neverson; Mikey; Massenburg; Stacey Owens	Stacey "S.O.S." Owens; Mummet Daddy	3:26
16.	"Rain" (featuring Swae Lee)	T. Neverson; Khalif Brown; N. Neverson; Matthew Samuels	Akeel; DZL	3:43
17.	"Tug of War"	T. Neverson; N. Neverson; Taylor; Jeffery Robinson, Jr.; Maulik Smith	Taylor; Fresh Ayr	3:54
18.	"All This Love"	T. Neverson; N. Neverson; Taylor; Eric Hudson; Johnta Austin	Taylor; Hudson; Austin; Danny Murdock, Jr.	4:48
19.	"OG Lovelude"	T. Neverson; N. Neverson; Taylor	Taylor	1:34
20.	"2020 Riots: How Many Times"	T. Neverson; N. Neverson; Taylor; Oliver	Taylor; Oliver	3:24
21.	"I Know a Love"	T. Neverson; N. Neverson; Taylor; Carter; Norman; Trevon Waters	Taylor; Paul	3:03
22.	"Noah Love"	T. Neverson; N. Neverson; Taylor	Taylor	0:59

== Charts ==
Chart (2020)	Peak position
US Billboard 200	15
US Top R&B/Hip-Hop Albums (Billboard)	9
