= Wild Thoughts =

2017 single by DJ Khaled

Single by DJ Khaled featuring Rihanna and Bryson Tiller

from the album Grateful
- Released: June 16, 2017
- Studio: We the Best Studios (North Miami, FL)
- Genre: Latin pop; R&B; pop
- Length: 3:24
- Label: We the Best; Epic
- Songwriters: Khaled Khaled; Robyn Fenty; Bryson Tiller; Jahron Braithwaite; Raul Rekow; Karl Perazzo; Marvin Moore-Hough; David McRae; Carlos Santana; Wyclef Jean; Jerry Duplessis
- Producers: DJ Khaled; DJ Nasty; LVM

DJ Khaled singles chronology
"I'm the One" (2017)	"Wild Thoughts" (2017)	"Top Off" (2018)

Rihanna singles chronology
"Selfish" (2017)	"Wild Thoughts" (2017)	"Loyalty" (2017)

Bryson Tiller singles chronology
"Somethin Tells Me" (2017)	"Wild Thoughts" (2017)	"Run Me Dry" (2017)

Music video
- "Wild Thoughts" on YouTube

"Wild Thoughts" is a song by American DJ and record producer DJ Khaled featuring Barbadian singer Rihanna and American singer Bryson Tiller. It was released on June 16, 2017, by We the Best and Epic Records as the third single from Khaled's tenth studio album, Grateful (2017). Canadian singer PartyNextDoor assisted the artists in writing the song. A mid-tempo pop song, "Wild Thoughts" consists of Latin percussion, acoustic guitar lines and riffs that interpolate the 1999 hit single "Maria Maria" by Carlos Santana. Lyrically, the song praises a lover who inspires sexual thoughts.

Commercially, the song reached number one in the United Kingdom, marking Khaled's second and Rihanna's ninth number one. The song also saw chart success in Australia and Canada, where it peaked at number two. The song peaked at number two on the US Billboard Hot 100, becoming Rihanna's 31st top-ten song, Khaled's third, and Tiller's first.

The music video for the song was directed by Colin Tilley and was shot in the Little Haiti neighborhood of Miami, Florida. The music video was nominated in three categories at the MTV Video Music Awards for Video of the Year, Best Collaboration and Best Art Direction.

== Background and composition ==
Bryson Tiller and Khaled had first collaborated on the track "Ima Be Alright" for Khaled's ninth studio album, Major Key (2016). During Grateful's recording, Khaled invited Tiller to his house for dinner. During dinner, Khaled played the initial demo of "Wild Thoughts" to Tiller and asked him if he could do something with the song. Tiller returned home and recorded his verse and sent it to Khaled, who used it on the final recording. While talking about collaborating with Rihanna for the first time in an interview with Entertainment Weekly, Khaled said, "Seven, eight years I've been trying to do this. I always put the kites out there that I wanted to work with her. But at the same time, while I was putting the kites out there, I was always getting the right record ready. You've gotta start with the right energy to see if something comes back that's possible."

"Wild Thoughts" is a mid-tempo pop song with Latin percussion and "slinky acoustic guitar lines." The song heavily samples the guitar riff from Santana's "Maria Maria" (1999), which features the Product G&B, previously sampling the instrumental of Wu-Tang Clan's "Wu-Tang Clan Ain't Nuthing ta Fuck Wit" (1993) that samples the theme song to the '60s animated series Underdog. Written in the key of C minor, it has a tempo of 96–100 beats per minute in simple quadruple (4/4) time. The song follows a chord progression of Cm–Fm–Cm, and Rihanna's and Tiller's vocals span from C_{4} to G_{5}. Billboard editor Andrew Unterberger noted that "Wild Thoughts" featured the same groove and riff as "Maria Maria" and even featured Wyclef Jean's "murmuring" who supplied the original song's ad-libs. Vanessa Okoth-Obbo of Pitchfork described the track as relying heavily on a "Latin rock aesthetic", with Rihanna and Tiller crooning lyrics that praise lovers who inspire wild thoughts. Okoth-Obbo described the lyrics as straddling the line between "innuendos and carnal statements", whilst also calling the singers' vocal performances restrained and controlled.

== Release and reception ==
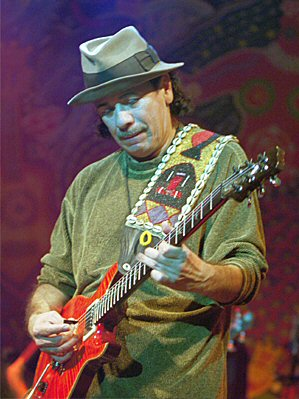
"Wild Thoughts" heavily samples "Maria Maria" performed by Santana. Guitarist Carlos Santana praised the use of the song.

On June 9, 2017, Khaled released the album's track listing, which included "Wild Thoughts". The song's artwork, which features Khaled's son Asahd, was revealed via Rihanna's Instagram account on June 15, 2017. "Wild Thoughts" was released on June 16, 2017, as the album's third single. Grateful was released on June 23, 2017.

Peter A. Berry from XXL wrote, "If all goes according to plan, it should go follow in the footsteps of 'I'm the One' and reach platinum status in the very near future." Janelle Okwode of Vogue said that the song "is an instant contender for song of the summer". Raisa Bruner from Time magazine listed the song on her list of five songs that should be heard. Bruner praised the song, calling it an "irresistible, Latin-inflected summer jam with some smooth verses courtesy of the addition of Bryson Tiller." Bruner continued to state that the song was truly Rihanna's, "but we all know this is Rihanna's show." In a second and more in-depth review, Burner stated:

"Wild Thoughts" kicks off with a bang and that instantly-recognizable Santana guitar melody, before segueing into Rihanna's low, compelling vocals and Tiller's verses. It feels like a spiritual successor to last year's hits "Work" and "One Dance" — but swapping those songs' dancehall vibes for Santana's guitar. Either way, it's an intoxicating bop guaranteed to heat things up.

Uproxx's Corbin Reiff wrote that Rihanna "brings some serious heat", while Tiller "rolls through in the middle to reprise his verse, and brings some serious R&B vibes with along him". Matt Miller of Esquire praised Rihanna's saying that she "completely commands the song, the power of her voice, her presence takes the entire thing over." Miller was less favourable about Tiller and the Santana sample calling their inclusion forgettable. Billboard editor Andrew Unterberger wrote that this is "practically a cover with different lyrics" of "Maria Maria", saying that it is "not a perfect song, but it's a super-fun resurrection of the now 18-year-old single". Elias Leight from Rolling Stone called it "another warm-weather-friendly single" by Khaled.

=== Original artists' responses ===
Carlos Santana, who wrote "Maria Maria", the song which is sampled on "Wild Thoughts", praised Khaled's, Rihanna's and Tiller's take on the song. "There is a reason that the infectious groove/theme that Wyclef and I created on 'Maria Maria' still resonates today. It speaks to the heart. DJ Khaled, Rihanna and Bryson take that vibe and bring it to a new dimension with 'Wild Thoughts', but the groove and essence of the song is still intact." He continued, "I am honored that DJ Khaled, Rihanna and Bryson felt the intense intentionality of 'Maria Maria' and have shared this summer vibe with the world."

The Product G&B, who originally sang "Maria Maria", had a mixed response to "Wild Thoughts". They stated they were grateful and called the song a "blessing", noting that in "Wild Thoughts", "you hear 'Maria', it’s bringing awareness all around." However, they believed that "Wild Thoughts" had stripped the original of its meaning and "its association with West Side Story, where the musical's character Maria stood to represent both the grim reality of gang violence and poverty and the hope for a better life."

== Commercial performance ==
On June 26, "Wild Thoughts" debuted at number four on the US Billboard Hot 100, with 89,000 digital copies sold and 36.3 million streams. The song marked Rihanna's 31st top-ten, Khaled's third and Tiller's first. The song's debut additionally marked the third-highest debut of Rihanna's 60 Hot 100 entries and made Rihanna the fourth woman to make at least 60 Hot 100 appearances, joining Nicki Minaj (78), Aretha Franklin (73) and Taylor Swift (70). In its second week the song rose to a new peak of three on the Billboard Hot 100, becoming the first song to debut in the top five and rise in its second week since Eminem's "The Monster", also featuring Rihanna (2013). After slipping to number four on the Hot 100, "Wild Thoughts" rebounded to peak in the runner-up slot and remained there for seven consecutive weeks, but was blocked off the top spot only by Luis Fonsi, Daddy Yankee and Justin Bieber's "Despacito". It also earned Rihanna her record-extending 29th Radio Songs top 10, continuing her lead over Mariah Carey (23). "Wild Thoughts" additionally peaked at number one on the Hot R&B/Hip-Hop Songs chart, becoming Rihanna's seventh number one, Khaled's third and Tiller's first.

"Wild Thoughts" became Khaled's and Tiller's first number-one song on the Dance Club Songs chart, and Rihanna's 31st. It is Rihanna's fourth number-one on the chart in 2017, following "Love on the Brain", "Sex with Me" and "Pose", the most among all acts; she is one of only four acts to have achieved four number-ones in a calendar year, one of two to do so twice, and the only one to have done so five times. "Wild Thoughts" is also only one of four out of her 31 chart-toppers whereby Rihanna is not the lead artist.

On July 21, "Wild Thoughts" reached number one on the UK Singles Chart. It is Khaled's second number one in the UK following "I'm the One", Rihanna's ninth, and the first chart-topper for Tiller.

== Music video ==
The music video for "Wild Thoughts", directed by Colin Tilley, was shot in the Little Haiti neighborhood of Miami, Florida, in June 2017. The first images from the shoot were released online on June 6, 2017. The video premiered via Khaled's Vevo channel on June 16, 2017. Katie Skinner from Billboard magazine gave an in-depth review of Rihanna's fashion throughout the music video. Skinner stated that the video had an "upbeat summer nightlife vibe in a tropical Miami setting" which "Rihanna and Khaled carry out that concept by dressing in bright-hued outfits, serving up some serious polychromatic summer looks straight off the runway." During a breakdown of the video Skinner stated that Rihanna's first look saw her wearing a "psychedelic Balenciaga high-waisted floral-print leggings with matching 'Knife' boots, a bright-pink vintage Betsey Johnson crop top and a pair of oversize crescent-shape Lynn Ban earrings." This was accompanied by a floral head scarf, green vintage Versace belt and a pair of pink Karen Walker sunglasses. In the following scene Rihanna wore a "short turquoise off-the-shoulder silk chiffon dress by Alberta Ferretti" along with a pair of gladiator sandals designed by Rihanna and Manolo Blahnik. During the last few seconds of the video, Rihanna stands beside Khaled and Tiller, wearing a bright nylon off-the-shoulder top and cargo pants designed by Matthew Adams Dolan.

== Live performances ==
Rihanna performed the song with Khaled and Tiller at the 60th Annual Grammy Awards, and solo at the halftime show of Super Bowl LVII. She then performed it in India in 2024 at a private wedding event for the Ambani family.

== Remixes ==
On July 10, 2017, American rappers A Boogie wit da Hoodie and Fabolous released their remix of the song, titled "Wild Thots". Canadian singer and rapper Tory Lanez also released his remix of the track featuring American singer Trey Songz on July 21, 2017.

== Awards and nominations ==
Year	Organization	Award	Result	R
2017	MTV Video Music Awards	Video of the Year	Nominated	
2017	MTV Video Music Awards	Best Collaboration	Nominated	
2017	MTV Video Music Awards	Best Art Direction	Nominated	
2017	MTV Video Music Awards	Song of Summer	Nominated	
2017	BET Hip Hop Awards	Best Hip Hop Video	Nominated	
2017	BET Hip Hop Awards	Best Collabo, Duo or Group	Won	
2017	BET Hip Hop Awards	Single of the Year	Nominated	
2017	Soul Train Music Awards	Best Video of the Year	Nominated	
2017	Soul Train Music Awards	Best Song of the Year	Nominated	
2017	Soul Train Music Awards	Best Collaboration	Won	
2017	Soul Train Music Awards	Best Dance Performance	Nominated	
2017	Soul Train Music Awards	Rhythm & Bars Award	Nominated	
2017	MTV Europe Music Awards	Best Song	Nominated	
2018	iHeartRadio Music Awards	Song of the Year	Nominated	
2018	iHeartRadio Music Awards	Best Collaboration	Nominated	
2018	iHeartRadio Music Awards	Hip-Hop Song of the Year	Won	
2018	Billboard Music Awards	Top R&B Song	Nominated	
2018	BET Awards	Video of the Year	Nominated	
2018	BET Awards	Coca-Cola Viewer's Choice Award	Nominated	
2018	BET Awards	Best Collaboration	Won	

== Track listing ==
- Digital download
1. "Wild Thoughts" (featuring Rihanna and Bryson Tiller) – 3:24
- CD single
1. "Wild Thoughts" (featuring Rihanna and Bryson Tiller) – 3:24
2. "Wild Thoughts" (Medasin Dance Remix) (featuring Rihanna and Bryson Tiller) – 4:35
- Streaming – Bee's Knees Dance Remix
1. "Wild Thoughts" (Bee's Knees Dance Remix) (featuring Rihanna and Bryson Tiller) – 3:51
- Streaming – Dave Audé Dance Remix
1. "Wild Thoughts" (Dave Audé Dance Remix) (featuring Rihanna and Bryson Tiller) – 4:43
- Streaming – Medasin Dance Remix
1. "Wild Thoughts" (Medasin Dance Remix) (featuring Rihanna and Bryson Tiller) – 4:35
- Streaming – Mike Cruz Dance Remix
1. "Wild Thoughts" (Mike Cruz Dance Remix) (featuring Rihanna and Bryson Tiller) – 7:17
- Streaming – NOTD Dance Remix
1. "Wild Thoughts" (NOTD Dance Remix) (featuring Rihanna and Bryson Tiller) – 3:09

== Charts ==
=== Weekly charts ===
Chart (2017–2018)	Peak position
Australia (ARIA)	2
Australian Urban (ARIA)	1
Austria (Ö3 Austria Top 40)	9
Belgium (Ultratop 50 Flanders)	5
Belgium Urban (Ultratop 50 Flanders)	1
Belgium (Ultratop 50 Wallonia)	2
Belgium Urban (Ultratop 50 Wallonia)	2
Brazil (Crowley Charts)	69
Bulgaria Airplay (PROPHON)	1
Canada Hot 100 (Billboard)	2
Canada CHR/Top 40 (Billboard)	6
Canada Hot AC (Billboard)	23
CIS Airplay (TopHit)	95
Colombia (National-Report)	31
Costa Rica (Monitor Latino)	9
Croatia International Airplay (Top lista)	2
Czech Republic Airplay (ČNS IFPI)	30
Czech Republic Singles Digital (ČNS IFPI)	12
Denmark (Tracklisten)	3
Dominican Republic (Monitor Latino)	13
El Salvador (Monitor Latino)	14
Euro Digital Songs (Billboard)	2
Finland (Suomen virallinen lista)	8
France (SNEP)	4
Germany (GfK)	4
Greece Airplay (IFPI)	14
Greece Digital Songs (Billboard)	3
Hungary (Dance Top 40)	11
Hungary (Rádiós Top 40)	1
Hungary (Single Top 40)	8
Hungary (Stream Top 40)	7
Ireland (IRMA)	3
Israel International Airplay (Media Forest)	1
Italy (FIMI)	17
Japan Hot 100 (Billboard)	90
Lebanon (Lebanese Top 20)	3
Luxembourg Digital Songs (Billboard)	5
Malaysia (RIM)	17
Mexico (Billboard Mexican Airplay)	6
Netherlands (Dutch Top 40)	6
Netherlands (Single Top 100)	5
New Zealand (Recorded Music NZ)	2
Norway (VG-lista)	5
Panama (Monitor Latino)	6
Paraguay (Monitor Latino)	8
Philippines (Philippine Hot 100)	11
Poland Airplay (ZPAV)	31
Portugal (AFP)	2
Romania (Airplay 100)	1
Scottish Singles Sales (Official Charts)	5
Slovakia Airplay (ČNS IFPI)	30
Slovakia Singles Digital (ČNS IFPI)	3
Slovenia (SloTop50)	3
Spain (Promusicae)	10
Sweden (Sverigetopplistan)	4
Switzerland (Schweizer Hitparade)	3
UK Singles (Official Charts)	1
UK Hip Hop/R&B (Official Charts)	1
US Billboard Hot 100	2
US Adult Pop Airplay (Billboard)	23
US Dance Club Songs (Billboard)	1
US Dance Airplay (Billboard)	2
US Hot R&B/Hip-Hop Songs (Billboard)	1
US Pop Airplay (Billboard)	4
US Rhythmic Airplay (Billboard)	1

=== Year-end charts ===
Chart (2017)	Position
Australia (ARIA)	29
Austria (Ö3 Austria Top 40)	58
Belgium (Ultratop Flanders)	45
Belgium (Ultratop Wallonia)	46
Brazil (Pro-Música Brasil)	98
Canada (Canadian Hot 100)	19
Denmark (Tracklisten)	34
France (SNEP)	33
Germany (Official German Charts)	28
Hungary (Dance Top 40)	37
Hungary (Rádiós Top 40)	37
Hungary (Single Top 40)	41
Hungary (Stream Top 40)	43
Iceland (Tónlistinn)	31
Israel International Airplay (Media Forest)	9
Italy (FIMI)	78
Latvia Airplay (LaIPA)	55
Netherlands (Dutch Top 40)	43
Netherlands (Single Top 100)	38
New Zealand (Recorded Music NZ)	14
Romania (Airplay 100)	9
Spain (PROMUSICAE)	97
Sweden (Sverigetopplistan)	48
Switzerland (Schweizer Hitparade)	46
UK Singles (Official Charts Company)	13
US Billboard Hot 100	18
US Dance Club Songs (Billboard)	29
US Dance/Mix Show Airplay (Billboard)	14
US Hot R&B/Hip-Hop Songs (Billboard)	8
US Hot R&B Songs (Billboard)	2
US Mainstream Top 40 (Billboard)	27
US Rhythmic (Billboard)	3

Chart (2018)	Position
Hungary (Dance Top 40)	41
Hungary (Rádiós Top 40)	77
Romania (Airplay 100)	100

== Certifications ==
Region	Certification	Certified units/sales
Australia (ARIA)	7× Platinum	490,000^{‡}
Austria (IFPI Austria)	Gold	15,000^{‡}
Belgium (BRMA)	Platinum	20,000^{‡}
Brazil (Pro-Música Brasil)	Diamond	250,000^{‡}
Canada (Music Canada)	5× Platinum	400,000^{‡}
Denmark (IFPI Danmark)	2× Platinum	180,000^{‡}
France (SNEP)	Diamond	233,333^{‡}
Germany (BVMI)	3× Gold	600,000^{‡}
Italy (FIMI)	2× Platinum	100,000^{‡}
Mexico (AMPROFON)	2× Platinum+Gold	150,000^{‡}
New Zealand (RMNZ)	6× Platinum	180,000^{‡}
Poland (ZPAV)	3× Platinum	60,000^{‡}
Portugal (AFP)	2× Platinum	20,000^{‡}
Spain (Promusicae)	Platinum	40,000^{‡}
Sweden (GLF)	3× Platinum	120,000^{‡}
Switzerland (IFPI Switzerland)	Platinum	20,000^{‡}
United Kingdom (BPI)	4× Platinum	2,400,000^{‡}
United States (RIAA)	9× Platinum	9,000,000^{‡}
^{‡} Sales+streaming figures based on certification alone.

== Release history ==
Region	Date	Format	Version	Label	Ref.
Worldwide	June 16, 2017	Digital download	Original	We the Best; Epic	
United Kingdom	June 16, 2017	Rhythmic contemporary radio	Original	We the Best; Epic	
United States	June 19, 2017	Hot adult contemporary radio	Original	We the Best; Epic	
United States	June 20, 2017	Contemporary hit radio	Original	We the Best; Epic	
Italy	June 30, 2017	Contemporary hit radio	Original	Sony	
Various	July 21, 2017	Digital download; streaming	Bee's Knees Dance Remix	We the Best; Epic	
Various	July 21, 2017	Digital download; streaming	Dave Audé Dance Remix	We the Best; Epic	
Various	July 21, 2017	Digital download; streaming	Medasin Dance Remix	We the Best; Epic	
Various	July 21, 2017	Digital download; streaming	Mike Cruz Dance Remix	We the Best; Epic	
Various	July 21, 2017	Digital download; streaming	NOTD Dance Remix	We the Best; Epic	

== Fines ==
In 2018, Turkey’s top media watchdog, the Radio and Television Supreme Council (RTÜK), reviewed the English-language lyrics of the song, and issued fines after concluding that they were inappropriate. RTÜK issued a 17,065 Turkish lira fine to the Turkish music channels NR1 and Dream TV.

== See also ==
- List of Airplay 100 number ones of the 2010s
- List of top 10 singles in 2017 (Australia)
- List of Billboard Hot 100 top 10 singles of 2017 (U.S.)
- List of number-one dance singles of 2017 (U.S.)
- List of Billboard number-one R&B/hip-hop songs of 2017 (U.S.)
- List of Billboard number-one Rhythmic songs of 2017 (U.S.)
- List of UK Singles Chart number ones of 2017
- List of UK R&B Singles Chart number ones of 2017
