= Run Me Dry =

Single by Bryson Tiller

from the album True to Self
- Released: July 25, 2017
- Genre: R&B
- Length: 2:49
- Label: RCA
- Songwriter(s): Bryson Tiller; Matthew Samuels; Allen Ritter
- Producer(s): Boi-1da; Ritter

Bryson Tiller singles chronology
"Wild Thoughts" (2017)	"Run Me Dry" (2017)	"Insecure" (2017)

Music video
- "Run Me Dry" on YouTube

"Run Me Dry" is a song by American singer Bryson Tiller. It was released on July 25, 2017, as the second single from his second studio album, True to Self (2017). Tiller co-wrote the song with its producers Boi-1da and Allen Ritter.

== Release ==
"Run Me Dry" is taken from Tiller's second studio album, True to Self, which was released in May 2017. It was sent to the rhythmic contemporary radio as the album's second single on July 25, 2017.

== Music video ==
The music video for the song, directed by Hamish Stephenson, premiered via Tiller's Vevo channel on September 12, 2017.

== Charts ==
=== Weekly charts ===
Chart (2017)	Peak position
Canada (Canadian Hot 100)	62
UK Singles (OCC)	70
US Billboard Hot 100	91
US Hot R&B/Hip-Hop Songs (Billboard)	39

== Certifications ==
Region	Certification	Certified units/sales
Canada (Music Canada)	Gold	40,000^{‡}
New Zealand (RMNZ)	Platinum	30,000^{‡}
United Kingdom (BPI)	Gold	400,000^{‡}
United States (RIAA)	Platinum	1,000,000^{‡}
^{‡} Sales+streaming figures based on certification alone.

== Release history ==
Country	Date	Format	Label	Ref.
United States	July 25, 2017	Rhythmic contemporary	RCA	
