= WAP (song) =

2020 single by Cardi B

Single by Cardi B featuring Megan Thee Stallion
- Released: August 7, 2020
- Recorded: 2020
- Genre: Trap-pop; hip-hop; dirty rap
- Length: 3:07; 2:46 (radio edit)
- Label: Atlantic; KSR
- Composers: Austin Owens; James Foye III; Frank Rodriguez
- Lyricists: Belcalis Almánzar; Megan Pete; Jorden Thorpe
- Producers: Ayo the Producer; Keyz

Cardi B singles chronology
| "Writing on the Wall" (2019) | "WAP" (2020) | "Me Gusta" (2020) |

Megan Thee Stallion singles chronology
| "Girls in the Hood" (2020) | "WAP" (2020) | "Don't Stop" (2020) |

Music video
- "WAP" on YouTube

"WAP" (an acronym for "Wet-Ass Pussy") is a song by American rapper Cardi B featuring Megan Thee Stallion. It was released on August 7, 2020, through Atlantic Records and KSR. Originally intended as the lead single for Cardi B's second studio album, it was ultimately included as the final track on Am I the Drama? (2025). Musically, it is a hip-hop song driven by heavy bass, drum beats, and a sample of Frank Ski's single "Whores in This House" (1993). Its sexually explicit lyrics helped with its popularity, and the song peaked at number one on the U.S. Billboard Hot 100.

After shelving a demo of the song in 2019, Cardi B revisited the song during COVID-19 lockdowns, recording additional verses and deciding to turn it into a collaboration with Megan. In the lyrics, Cardi B and Megan discuss how they want to be pleased by men, specifically referencing numerous sexual practices. Upon release, "WAP" received widespread acclaim from music critics, who praised its themes of sex-positivity and female empowerment, with Rolling Stone, NPR, and several other publications ranking it as the best song of 2020.

It became the first female rap collaboration to debut atop the U.S. Billboard Hot 100 and had the largest opening streaming week for a song in U.S. history. It gave Cardi B her fourth number-one single and Megan her second in the U.S. The single spent four non-consecutive weeks atop the chart and spent multiple weeks at number one in several other countries. "WAP" became the first number-one single on the inaugural Billboard Global 200, topping the chart for three weeks, and it earned the 11th position on IFPI's year-end singles chart. As of August 2026, the song was certified Diamond by the Recording Industry Association of America (RIAA).

A music video directed by Colin Tilley accompanied the single's release. It features cameos from several women, including reality television personality Kylie Jenner, singers Normani and Rosalía, and rappers Latto, Sukihana, and Rubi Rose. "WAP" broke the record for the biggest 24-hour debut for an all-female collaboration on YouTube. Cardi B and Megan performed the song at the 63rd Annual Grammy Awards, leading to over 1,000 viewer complaints being sent to the Federal Communications Commission. Social conservative politicians and pundits objected to the song for its sexually explicit lyrics, and the ensuing discourse fueled the song's impact.

== Background and release ==
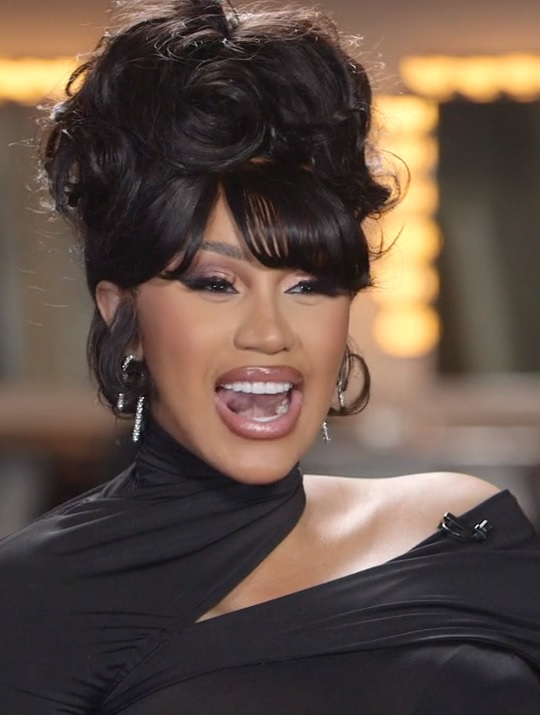
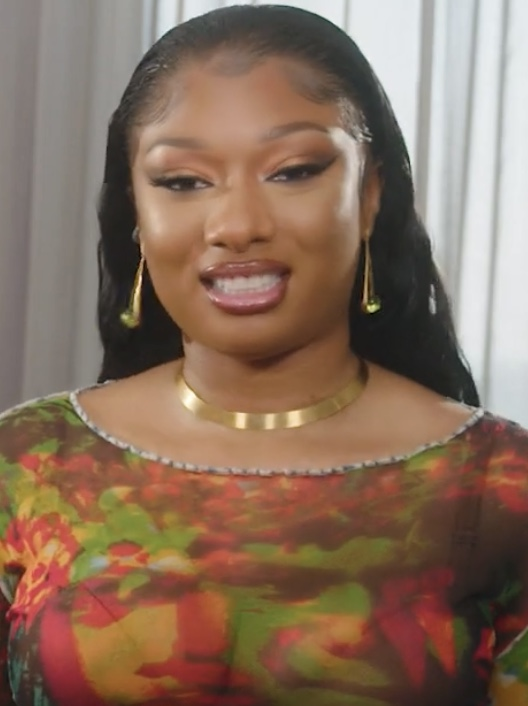
"WAP" was recorded by Cardi B (left, pictured in 2021) and Megan Thee Stallion (right, pictured in 2021).

Cardi B's first album Invasion of Privacy, released in 2018, was recorded on an accelerated timeline so it could be completed before the birth of her daughter Kulture. After that experience, her writing process became more flexible, taking additional time to explore ideas. "WAP" originated with a beat sent to her by Ayo the Producer and Keyz. She recorded what became its first verse in 2019 but ended up shelving it indefinitely.

When COVID-19 lockdowns were instituted in March 2020, Cardi B decided to stay in Los Angeles and use that time to work on music. She and her team rented a house and turned it into a studio for three months. Going through previously recorded tracks, Cardi B wrote an additional verse for "WAP", continuing to rework parts of the song several times. She was initially unsatisfied with the song's hook, feeling that "wet-ass pussy" was repeated too much. She began sending it to other female artists to see if they could improve on it.

I'm talking about ... maybe 50 different versions before I arrived at a place like, "Oh shit, I think I got it." ... The first person I let hear it was Cardi. Cardi is one of them people like, "... let me hear it! Let's see what you got!" ... The thing you're making sure you do is that they complement each other well, that they sit well on the track together and that ... it feels fluid to your ear.

— Brooklyn Johnny in an interview with Billboard

Cardi B and Megan Thee Stallion first connected through their respective wardrobe stylists. After meeting her in Los Angeles, Cardi B told her team that she was considering a collaboration with her. A couple of days later, both sent tracks to each other. Cardi B had her business partner Brooklyn Johnny send "WAP". After receiving Megan's verses, the song's engineers started editing and mixing vocals, still trying to find a way to emphasize the song's hook. They decided to switch the order of Megan's verses to improve the way the song flowed.

On August 3, Cardi B revealed an upcoming collaboration with Megan Thee Stallion. The announcement included the single artwork which shows the two rappers back to back against a bright pink background, holding out their tongues. They are styled with gold "WAP" hoop earrings, 1990s-inspired makeup, and tall interlocking updos. The day before the single's release, Frank Ski teased his involvement through a Twitter post. Cardi B and Megan promoted the premiere with a livestream on YouTube.

"WAP" was released on August 7, 2020, as a digital download, vinyl, and cassette. It marked Cardi B's first release of 2020, and Megan's first release following a highly publicized shooting incident involving Tory Lanez, where Megan had sustained injuries from a bullet to her feet. A clean version was released to U.S. radio stations, in which a number of the profanities are censored. For example, the hook is changed from "wet-ass pussy" to "wet and gushy". To accompany the release of the single, Cardi B launched a line of waterproof "WAP" merchandise which included umbrellas and raincoats. She confirmed that the song will appear on her upcoming second studio album.

== Music and lyrics ==
"WAP"
The song's sparse beat places emphasis on the rappers' vivid sexual imagery. In this excerpt, Cardi B's steadily paced flow contrasts with Megan's rapid-fire delivery.

"WAP" is a hip-hop, trap, and dirty rap song. It uses a vocal sample from Frank Ski's 1993 Baltimore club single "Whores in This House". The sample consists of Al "T" McLaran chanting "There's some whores in this house" in the style of a military cadence. It is looped around 80 times over the course of the song, with its pitch shifted up in some sections. The music is minimal—drum programming, a throbbing bass line, and McLaran's looped chant—leaving emphasis on the rapping. Writing credits are given to Cardi B, Megan Thee Stallion, producers Ayo and Keyz, Ski, and Pardison Fontaine.

In "WAP", Cardi B and Megan boast about their sexual prowess while listing their own erotic needs. Their lyrics describe sexual acts through vivid, outlandish metaphors like "Punani Dasani" and "Swipe your nose like a credit card". Cardi B invokes "macaroni in a pot" as a reference to the viscous sounds of sex. Megan's lines "Switch my wig, make him feel like he cheating" and "You can't hurt my feelings, but I like pain" allude to roleplay and BDSM respectively. The title is an acronym for "Wet-Ass Pussy".

Cardi B's starts the song in a "throaty" register, delivered "as if she's inching up close to her partner's ear". Her flow during the verses, described as a "staccato bark", is steadily paced in the style of her earlier Gangsta Bitch Music mixtapes, for clear articulation of each line. In contrast, Megan makes use of a nimble, rapid-fire flow.

=== Credit disputes ===
McLaran was improperly credited as a performer but not as a songwriter on the original "Whores in This House". Other singles sampling the song have inconsistently credited him; Joe Budden's "Fire (Yes, Yes Y'all)" includes McLaran as a cowriter, but Lil Wayne's "In This House" does not. Ski and McLaran talked after the release of "WAP" and reached an agreement to give him a cut of the royalties from "WAP".

Rapper Necey X sued Cardi B and Megan for copyright infringement in 2022. Necey had previously entered a failed partnership running an assisted living center with Fontaine's father. Her lawsuit alleged that "WAP" and Megan's 2021 single "Thot Shit" infringed on her 2019 song "Grab Em by the Pussy". Judge Andrew L. Carter Jr. dismissed the suit, stating that Necey could not claim ownership of "the phrase 'p*ssy [sic] so wet' because it 'existed long before she included it in her song.'"

== Critical reception ==
"WAP" received widespread critical acclaim. For Pitchfork, Lakin Starling called it "a nasty-ass rap bop, bursting with the personality of two of rap's most congenial household names". Jon Caramanica of The New York Times deemed it "an event record that transcends the event itself", and stated that both rappers "are exuberant, sharp and extremely ... vividly detailed" in the song that "luxuriates in raunch". Rania Aniftos of Billboard described the song as a "scorching banger". Mikael Wood of Los Angeles Times deemed it a "savage, nasty, sex-positive triumph" and stated that "the women's vocal exuberance is the show—the way they tear into each perfectly rendered lyric and chew up the words like meat".

For The Guardian, Dream McClinton wrote, "the hit collaboration ... has become a belated song of the summer, empowering women and enraging prudes along the way ... [it] should be celebrated, not scolded". In NPR, cultural critic Taylor Crumpton deemed both rappers "women leading the genre into [a] new era of unification between women rappers" with "an already iconic song about women sexuality". She praised the message, describing it as "if you need to come, step to me, you have to be able to fill my sexual needs, and these are what they are". In another article from Pitchfork, Jayson Greene said that it "has become the song of this ... summer—a ripe ... sex jam", deeming it detailed and "joyfully explicit".

== Music video ==
=== Development and release ===
Preparation for the "WAP" music video began almost immediately after Cardi B and Megan approved the final version of the song. JaQuel Knight worked on a choreography routine, and Cardi B spent three to four weeks rehearsing it, with Megan joining based on her availability. Atlantic Records wanted to expedite the video so it could be released before the end of the summer, and Cardi B approached Colin Tilley to direct. Kollin Carter and Patientce Foster served as co-creative directors, and Cardi B expressed to them an interest in filling the video with animals and bold colors. Foster described Cardi B's vision as "a house full of powerful women" without exclusions, and they put together a list of people who could potentially make cameo appearances, including several emerging female rappers. Singer Lizzo was among those invited to appear in the music video but was out of town when the shoot was scheduled.

Cardi B and Megan's wardrobe for the music video came from Nicolas Jebran, Bryan Hearns, Mugler designer Casey Cadwallader, and Juraj Zigman. Venus Prototype made latex outfits for the cameo guests, with Normani's drawing on a 1991 Azzedine Alaïa photoshoot with Naomi Campbell. Filming took place in Los Angeles during the week of July 6, 2020, days before new COVID-19 restrictions went into effect across the city. Practical sets were built for most of the rooms shown in the video, minimizing the amount of green screen needed. At Cardi B's request, she and Megan shot a scene while covered with snakes; however, footage of a tiger and leopard was shot separately for safety reasons. Tilley opted to use a distorted visual style inspired by Tim Burton and Dr. Seuss. Cardi B estimated the video's budget at $1 million, with over $100,000 of that spent on COVID testing for everyone on set.

On August 6, Cardi B announced via Instagram that the music video for the song would be released alongside the single the next day, but that the video would feature the censored version of the track. Garnering over 26 million views in its first day, "WAP" broke the record for the biggest 24-hour debut for an all-female collaboration on YouTube.

=== Synopsis ===
Cardi B and Megan in the mansion rooms covered in animal print and Willy Wonka-esque design, respectively.

The video shows Cardi B and Megan walking through a colorful mansion. They open the video in a mansion hallway, wearing custom dresses, opera gloves, and matching updos. During Cardi B's first verse they also appear in a snake-filled room. For this transition, the door knocker comes alive as a snake and eats the camera. The next scene shows both rappers in a green and purple room wearing matching bodysuits, composed of a corset bodice, mesh tights and sleeves, with Megan performing her first verse.

During a break in the music, Kylie Jenner strides down the hallway in a leopard-print bodysuit and cape. She opens the door to a leopard-themed room where Cardi B performs her second verse surrounded by leopards, wearing a matching bodysuit and pasties. Megan appears in a white tiger-themed bathroom with white tigers around her. The two rappers reunite in a shallow pool for a choreographed scene. The video ends with cameos from Normani, Rosalía, Latto, Rubi Rose, and Sukihana.

=== Critical reception ===
Writing for Billboard, Trevor Anderson commented that the video "transformed from just a promotional clip into a pop-culture phenomenon". Claire Shaffer and Althea Legaspi of Rolling Stone called the video "steamy" and "sensual". Chris Murphy of Vulture described the video as "very Dr. Seuss, but make it NSFW in a fun way". In Complex, Brianna Holt commented, "the music video couldn't be more timely". She described the set as "a mansion full of women who are demonstrative of their sexual prowess". Writing for The Guardian, Dream McClinton deemed the video "unapologetic in celebrating the sensuality and sexuality of women", adding, "it isn't shy or coy, it's about the loud articulation of female desire for sex, as they want it, and it centres them as active participants with agency". Burr in The Boston Globe argued that the same adults "who are up in arms over Cardi B on YouTube today" due to the video's "in-your-face outrageousness" celebrated sexually charged music videos on MTV 30 years ago, questioning if people "forget the youthful yearning to be free" when they become parents. He further added that the reason why "the rococo visual matters" is that it shows what it looks like "when a woman of color takes charge, which is still taboo in many corners of this country".

Alyssa Rosenberg of The Washington Post described the video as "an ode to female sexual pleasure" that is among the most sexually explicit content she has ever seen in mainstream American popular culture, and opined that in a "weird year" like 2020 "a culture-war clash feels refreshingly normal". Micha Frazer-Carroll of The Independent deemed the "absurdist" video "ludicrously excessive but utterly hypnotic" that "feels as if it were taking place in an alternative universe". In IndieWire, Leonardo Adrian Garcia considered it "a mix of Hype Williams and Tim Burton by way of the strip club", further adding that "it's a video that demands one's attention" and "deserves praise" despite the "lightning rod for very dumb controversy" that generated.

Writing for Pitchfork, Eric Torres called the music video "easily one of the best of the year", deeming it "a vibrant display of self-empowerment that could only come from two of rap's most brazenly sex-positive voices". In Complex, Jessica McKinney stated that the video created "an inescapable pop culture moment" that "completely dominated the conversation" with "vivid imagery, glamorous costumes, trippy effects, and dynamic choreography", further adding that it "set the standard for quality videos in 2020, calling for other artists to put more thought and effort into their visuals as we move into the new year".

=== Other responses ===
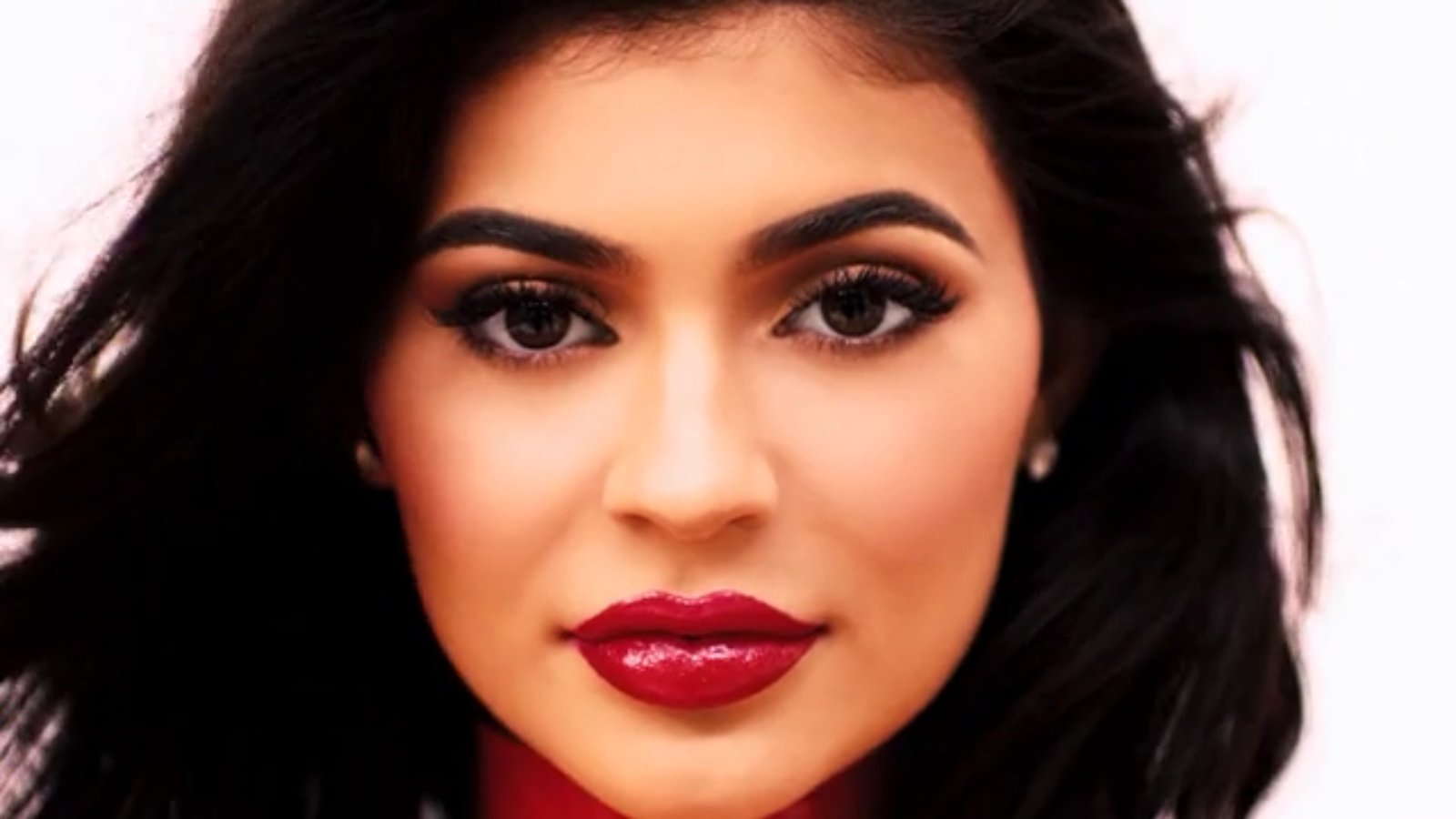
Kylie Jenner (pictured in 2017) appears in the music video.

Fan reactions to Kylie Jenner's cameo in the video were negative. Many social media users expressed displeasure with her appearance in a video whose cast mainly consisted of Black women, especially considering her history of alleged cultural appropriation. Cardi B later explained that she put Jenner in the video because Jenner was a close friend of hers, saying, "Not everything is about race." Co-creative director Patientce Foster was asked about a Change.org petition that called for Jenner to be removed from the music video, and she called it "bullshit".

Tiger King star and Big Cat Rescue CEO Carole Baskin spoke out against the use of big cats in the video. In a statement for Billboard, she added that the video promotes wealthy individuals owning tigers as pets. "That makes every ignorant follower want to imitate by doing the same", said Baskin, adding that "they probably dealt with one of the big cat pimps, who makes a living from beating ... cats to make them stand on cue in front of a green screen in a studio." Cardi B responded in an interview with Vice, saying "I'm not gonna engage with Carole Baskin on that ... Like, that's just ridiculous, you know? ... Like, girl you killed your goddamn husband." Representatives from PETA similarly took issue with the use of big cats in the video, saying in another statement to Billboard, "if real animals were used instead of computer-generated imagery, the message sent is that animal exploitation is Okurrr—and it isn't. If Cardi B and Megan Thee Stallion really care about pussy liberation, they wouldn't use suffering big cats as props."

== Commercial performance ==
=== North America ===
"WAP" debuted at number one on the Billboard Hot 100 chart, garnering Cardi B her fourth chart-topper in the US, extending her record as the female rapper with the most number-one singles. It was Megan's second number-one single. Cardi B became the only female rapper to achieve Hot 100 number-one singles in two different decades (2010s and 2020s). "WAP" became the first female rap collaboration to debut at number one on the Hot 100. The song was driven by 93 million streams, 125,000 downloads and 11.6 million radio airplay impressions. As the song topped the Digital Song Sales and Streaming Songs charts, it became Cardi B's fourth chart-topper on the former, Cardi B's third on the latter, and Megan's second on both.

The 93 million streaming total became the largest number of first-week streams in Billboard history and of weekly streams in 2020. "WAP" generated the most weekly on-demand U.S. audio streams among songs by female artists, with 54.7 million streams, during the best sales week for a song since Taylor Swift's "Me!" featuring Brendon Urie.

"WAP" became the first song to spend its first two weeks at number one on the Hot 100 since Ariana Grande's "7 Rings". In between those chart-toppers, eight songs debuted at number one, each spending a single week at the summit. Of the 42 songs that have entered the chart at number one since the Hot 100 started in 1958, 19 including "WAP" remained on top in their second weeks. "WAP" also became the first song among female artists to lead the Hot 100 for multiple weeks since Mariah Carey's "All I Want for Christmas Is You". For the chart issue dated September 26, "WAP" achieved a fourth non-consecutive week atop the chart.

"WAP" also reached number one on the Hot R&B/Hip-Hop Songs and Hot Rap Songs charts, marking Cardi B's fifth number-one entry on the former and fourth on the latter, and Megan's second on both. Billboard called the song "one of the most dominant Hot 100 number ones of the last 30 years".

"WAP" debuted at number one on the Canadian Hot 100, becoming Cardi B's second chart-topper and Megan's first. It spent four non-consecutive weeks atop the chart. It was the most streamed song of 2020 in the U.S. by a female artist, with 732.7 million on-demand streams, ranking sixth among all. In the US, Cardi B has achieved three times the best-performing song of the year by a female artist—the only act to do so this century—with "WAP" (2020) joining "Bodak Yellow" (2017) and "I Like It" (2018).

=== Europe and Oceania ===
In Australia, "WAP" became the third hip-hop song by female artists to top the ARIA Singles Chart, and the first since 1992. It spent six weeks atop the chart, becoming the longest-running number-one song by a female hip-hop artist.

In the United Kingdom, "WAP" debuted at number four on the UK Singles Chart's August 14–20, 2020, weekly chart. During its fourth consecutive week on the chart (September 4–10), the song reached number one―becoming both artists' first song to top the charts in Britain and the first female rap collaboration to do so. The song spent three weeks at the top of the chart.

In Europe, the song reach the top ten in Denmark, in Hungary and in Portugal, top twenty in Belgium, in Netherlands and in Germany, top thirty in France and top forty in Italy.

The song became the first number-one single for both artists on the Republic of Ireland's Irish Singles Chart, where it spent three weeks at the top.

"WAP" debuted at number two on the Official New Zealand Music Chart, peaking at the top of the chart the following week, becoming Cardi B's second chart-topper and Megan's first chart-topper. It remained atop the chart for six weeks.

=== Worldwide ===
The music video for "WAP" broke the record for the most views within 24 hours for a female collaboration, with over 26.5 million views. Cardi B was ranked at number one on Bloomberg's August 2020 Pop Star Power Ranking due to the success of "WAP".

The song charted at number one on Billboard's Global 200—with 100.9 million global streams and 23,000 global downloads—and number three on its Global Excl. U.S. during the inaugural week of both charts (September 4, 2020). It topped the Global 200 chart for three non-consecutive weeks.

== Live performances ==
The COVID-19 pandemic forestalled live performances of "WAP" after its release. It was first performed by Megan Thee Stallion as part of a Tidal Live stream on August 29, 2020.

Cardi B and Megan Thee Stallion performed it together for the first time at the 63rd Annual Grammy Awards, airing on CBS on March 14, 2021. Grammys host Trevor Noah prefaced the performance with, "If you have small children in the room, just tell them it's a song about giving a cat a bath". The show featured a large shoe whose stiletto heel functioned as a dance pole, as well as a giant bed used as a platform by the rappers and their backup dancers. The chorus—replaced in censored versions with "wet and gushy"—was changed to "wet, wet, wet".

Billboard ranked it as the best performance of the ceremony, commenting that "this had to be one of the most insane television debut performances of all time." Music critic Jon Caramanica called the performance "wildly and charmingly salacious, frisky and genuine in a way that the Grammys has rarely if ever made room for". In 2022, Rolling Stone listed it among the 25 "greatest Grammy performances of all time", the only female rap act on the list. The Federal Communications Commission received a large number of viewer complaints about the broadcast (see § Broadcast controversy).

When Megan performed the song in her 2021 Lollapalooza set, a recording of ASL interpreter Kelly Kurdi went viral online. Kurdi's interpretation, originally created by dancer Raven Sutton, used expressive gestures to represent the song's lyrics about gagging and choking. Cardi B and Megan reunited during the former's set at the 2022 Wireless Festival in London, for their first live performance together since the Grammys.

== Impact ==
"WAP" became one of the most sexually explicit songs ever to top the U.S. chart, and the ensuing moral panic about its subject matter contributed to its popularity. In an article for The Independent about what the song's commercial achievement says about the changing shape of the music industry, Micha Frazer-Carroll stated that "the undeniable smash of the year captured the spirit of 2020". Nick Levine of the BBC stated that the song's success as a "celebration of female sexual agency" creates space for many more female artists "to write unselfconsciously about what they want". In The Wall Street Journal, Neil Shah considered the song "a big moment for female rappers" and "a historic sign that women artists are making their mark on hip-hop like never before". Complex called the song "the epitome of female empowerment." in which the women featured are "unapologetically themselves." Carl Lamarre of Billboard stated that the song's success has "a deeper significance", describing it as "a clever Trojan horse for the myriad ways Cardi B influences the culture with every move she makes". Complex staff named it the song "that had the most pure impact" in 2020, with it being an "empowering anthem" largely because is "a record-breaking song performed by two Black women". Rolling Stone staff commented that the public outrage from conservative figures contributed to the song's "pop-cultural impact".

The song was particularly popular on TikTok, where it was treated as light-hearted blue humor instead of a battleground for a culture war. Teenagers and young adults played "WAP" for their parents and recorded their reactions to post online. A viral dance for the song, choreographed by Brian Esperon, involved high kicks and spins before dry humping the ground. Several people injured themselves while attempting the difficult dance moves, prompting Cardi B to issue a warning. A remix set to the 1986 musical The Phantom of the Opera's main theme was shared on TikTok, where Andrew Lloyd Webber, the musical's composer, posted a video playing the piano to it. Within a month of "WAP"'s release, it had been used in over a million TikToks, and it ended the year as one of the app's most popular audio tags.

In an interview with Far Out, rapper CeeLo Green characterized the song as "salacious gesturing to kinda get into position", facing public backlash and later issuing an apology for his comments. Snoop Dogg discussed the song in an interview where he remarked, "That should be a possession that no one gets to know about until they know about it." Cardi B's husband Offset responded that he and Snoop both talk about similar subjects in their work, and Snoop walked back his comments after public backlash, expressing support for both Cardi B and Megan. Musicians Christina Aguilera, Azealia Banks, Halsey, Debbie Harry, JoJo, and Remy Ma spoke in support of the song.

On October 22, 2022, Madonna marked the 30th anniversary of the publication of her coffee table book Sex, contemplating its impact on modern pop culture. In an Instagram story, Madonna claimed that she paved the way for "WAP" (as well as Kim Kardashian's 2014 Paper cover and Miley Cyrus' "Wrecking Ball" music video), concluding it with "You're welcome bitches .......🤡" [sic]. Cardi B took offense and tweeted a day later that "these icons really become disappointments once [you] make it in the industry." However, later that day she deleted the tweets, and claimed she had talked to Madonna and that it had been "beautiful". "Weird Al" Yankovic included the song (with humorous sound effects censoring some lyrics) for his 2024 polka medley "Polkamania!"

=== Political reaction ===
"WAP" was criticized by many social conservatives in the United States, who claimed that the song was offensive and prurient, and that it would cause harm to American culture and society. James P. Bradley, a health industry executive and Republican politician, wrote, "Cardi B & Megan Thee Stallion are what happens when children are raised without God and without a strong father figure", adding that the song made him want to "pour holy water" in his ears. DeAnna Lorraine, also a California Republican, said the song set "the entire female gender back by 100 years" and that rappers were "completely wrong" if they thought the song does "anything to empower women." Angela Stanton-King, the Republican candidate in Georgia's 5th congressional district, suggested that the song supported organ harvesting from aborted fetal tissue.

Defenders of the song claimed that critics mischaracterized the artists. August Brown of the Los Angeles Times wrote that, contrary to Bradley's comments, Megan "did indeed have a strong father figure" and Cardi B "is no stranger to faith". Social media users accused Lorraine of hypocrisy for using the language of women's advocacy to denigrate a song created by two women.

Megan Thee Stallion responded personally to Lorraine's comments in an interview with GQ, mocking Lorraine for having "literally had to go listen to this song in its entirety". She went on to say that critics of the song, including Lorraine, must not have "WAP" themselves.

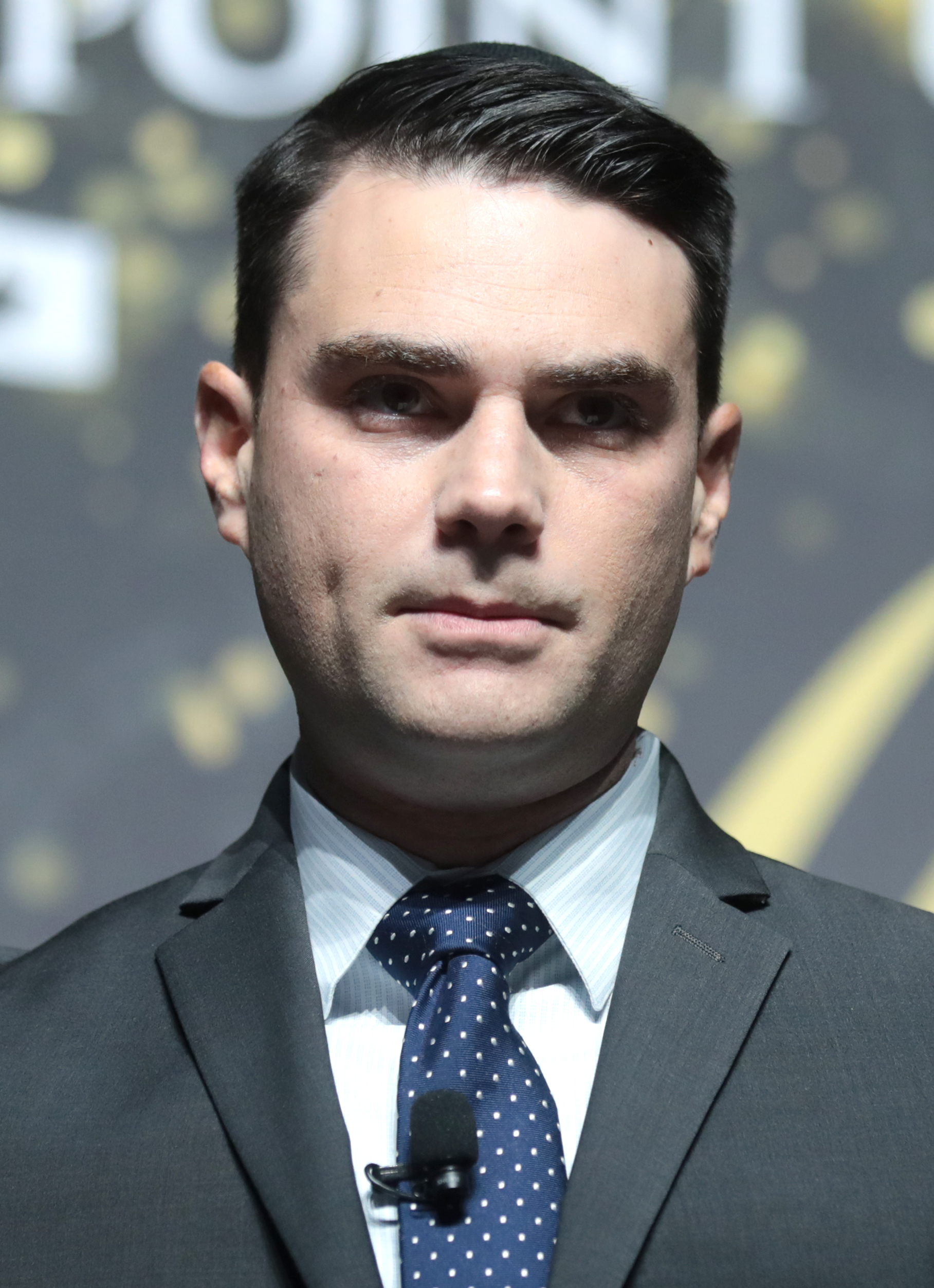
Ben Shapiro (pictured in 2019) was widely mocked for his sarcastic reading of the lyrics to "WAP".

In a video criticizing "WAP", conservative political commentator Ben Shapiro recited self-censored lyrics of the song in a serious manner, using euphemisms such as "wet-ass p-word". Shapiro's "WAP" commentary was mocked by fans of the song, and his remarks on vaginal lubrication were criticized as medically inaccurate by gynecologists. Some social media users called the comments a "self-own", implying that Shapiro was unfamiliar with vaginal lubrication due to a supposed inability to sexually satisfy his wife. Arwa Mahdawi in The Guardian opined that Shapiro's reaction was proof that "women taking charge of their sexuality ... drives conservatives up the wall", and remarked that Shapiro "doesn't seem particularly well acquainted with female anatomy".

After Cardi B encouraged the Democratic congresswoman Alexandria Ocasio-Cortez to run for U.S. president, Ocasio-Cortez tweeted "Women Against Patriarchy (WAP) 2020". Ryan Clancy, a county supervisor in Wisconsin, issued an apology after promoting the Weatherization Assistance Program with a "WAP" meme that read "There's some holes in this house!" When Democratic candidate Joe Biden won the 2020 presidential election, supporters took to singing "WAP" in front of the White House. During the ShutItAllDown demonstrations in Namibia, participants chanted the lyrics to "WAP", turning it into a protest anthem.

=== Broadcast controversy ===
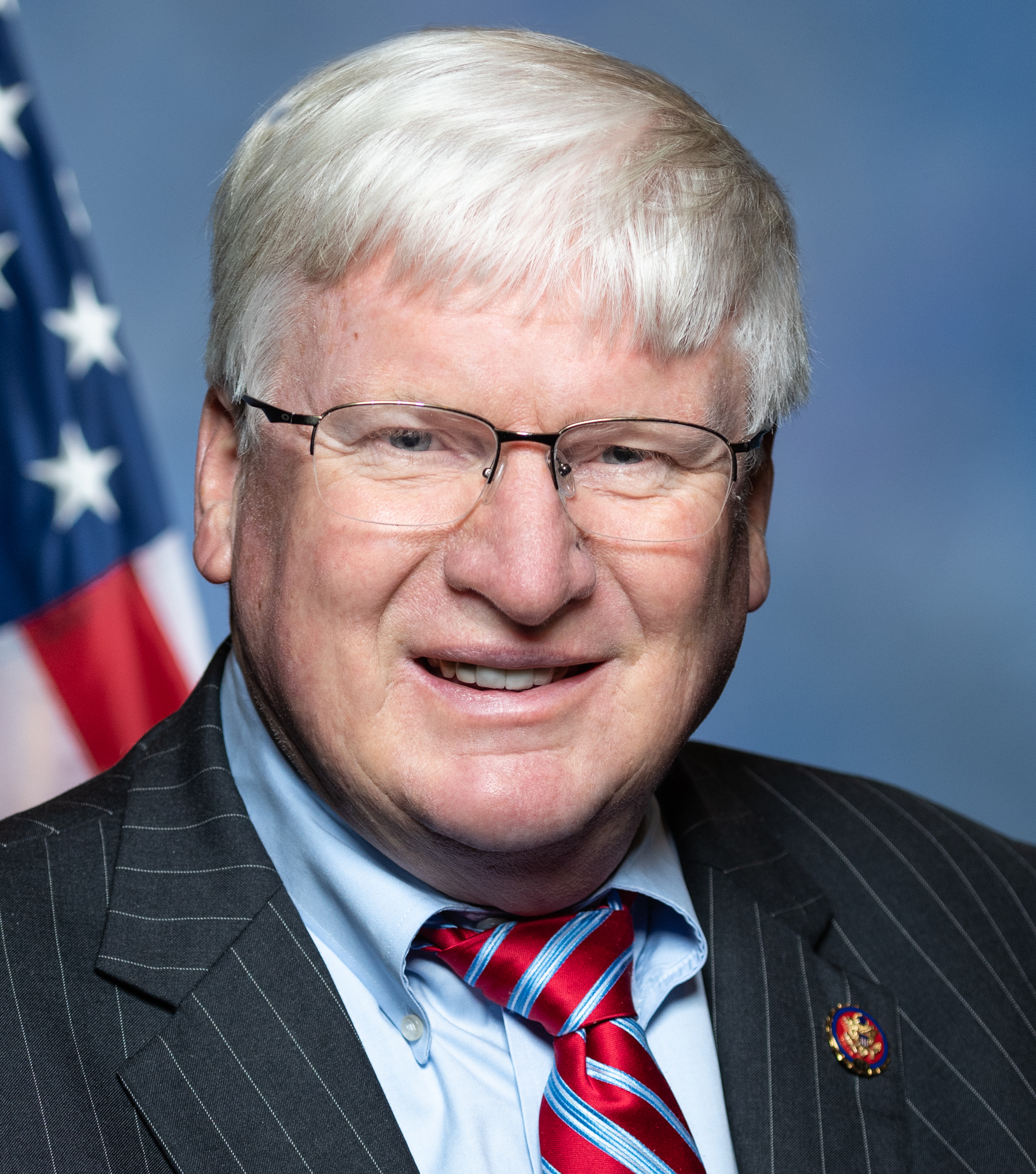
Wisconsin Representative Glenn Grothman pictured in 2020) criticized the Federal Communications Commission for enabling "the moral decline of America".

When Cardi B and Megan performed "WAP" at the Grammys, the Federal Communications Commission received over 1,000 complaints about the broadcast. California Republican gubernatorial candidate Errol Webber objected to the performance, tweeting that Cardi B "chooses to do wrong by girating [sic] and scissoring her WAP on national TV... in view of other people's kids." Conservative commentators Tucker Carlson and Candace Owens discussed the broadcast on Tucker Carlson Tonight, where Owens remarked, "We are weakening America... We are setting the stage, and it feels like...we are about to see the end of an empire." Cardi B facetiously celebrated appearing on Fox News, which escalated into an online dispute with Owens.

The following month, Wisconsin Representative Glenn Grothman raised the subject on the floor of the House of Representatives, accusing the FCC of "utter complacency". Cardi B responded on social media, characterizing Grothman's speech as grandstanding and suggesting that justice would not be served in the police shooting of Jacob Blake due to inattention from politicians. Tony Evers, the Democratic governor of Wisconsin, commented during a news conference, "It just seems troubling that we're arguing about things like that... It just seems like there's a lot more important things to worry about." Cardi B touches on the controversy in "Rumors", a 2021 collaboration with Lizzo where she raps "Last time I got freaky, the FCC sued me / But I'mma keep doing what I wanna do".

=== Cover versions ===
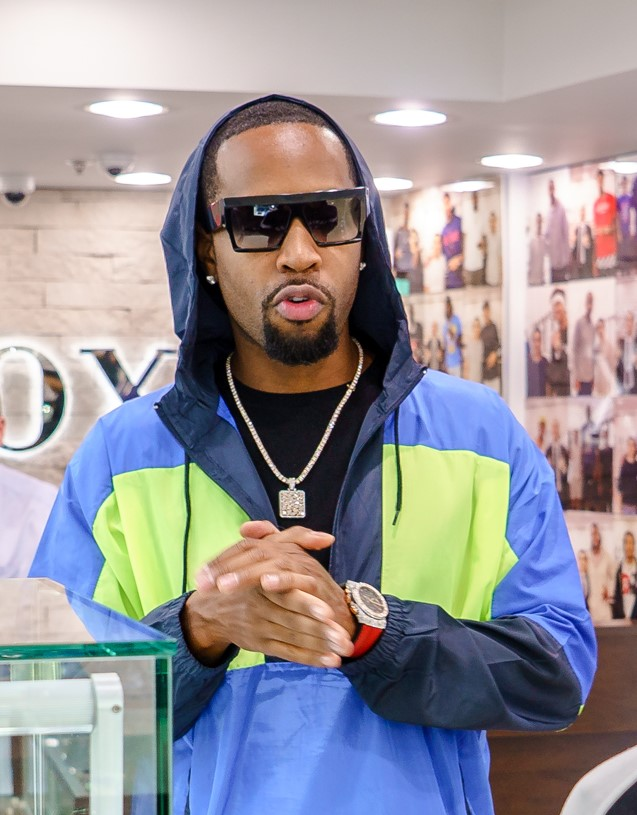
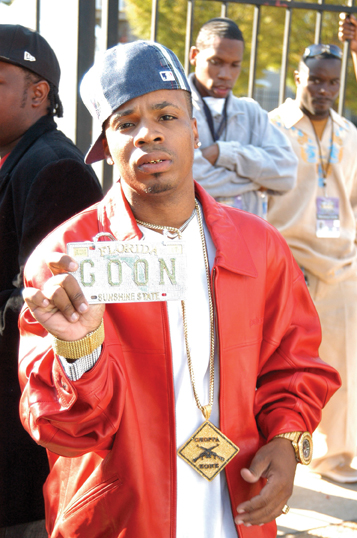
Rappers Safaree (left, pictured in 2019) and Plies (right, pictured in 2008) released remixes of "WAP". Safaree's remix was panned, while Plies' was positively received.

On August 10, 2020, rapper Safaree released a remix of "WAP" called "B.A.D" (an acronym for "Big Ass Dick"). The cover art features Cardi B and Megan on both ends, with a woman (assumed to be his wife Erica Mena) performing simulated oral sex on him in the center. The remix was widely panned by fans on social media, many of whom found the remix to be poorly timed, considering how soon after the song's original release it came. The same day, dancehall singer Vybz Kartel released a freestyle remix while in prison, which was met with enthusiasm by Cardi B. Rapper Plies released a "P-Mix" to the song on August 14, to positive reception.

"WAP" has been reinterpreted in many styles, ranging from noise rock to an arrangement played on hollowed-out melons. Country singer Margo Price performed an acoustic rendition on The Daily Show with Trevor Noah, as part of a segment on double standards about sex in music. Rolling Stone's Claire Shaffer said of the cover, "Price puts her genuine all into the song, and it comes out sounding like a legitimate country ode to 'wet ass pussy.'" Rapper Qveen Herby released a baroque pop cover version of the song as a promotional single on August 20. Several metal artists have recorded covers, including popular multi-instrumentalist Leo Moracchioli, with a music video posted to his YouTube channel. The video features a feline puppet taking a shower as an over-literal interpretation of the title.

YouTube parody artist Lardi B posted a food-based parody of the song, changing the acronym from "Wet-Ass Pussy" to "Wings and Pizza", on August 14. Drag queens Lady Bunny and Flotilla DeBarge released a parody of the song, entitled "DAP" (or "Dry-Ass Pussy"), on August 28. UK rock band Biffy Clyro performed a cover of the song for BBC Radio 1's Live Lounge on September 3, 2020. Before the Christmas season, students from the Johns Hopkins Bloomberg School of Public Health created a "WAmP: Wear A mask Please" parody, encouraging the wearing of masks to reduce COVID transmission.

The 2023 film Joy Ride includes a cover of the song by actors Ashley Park, Sherry Cola, Stephanie Hsu, and Sabrina Wu. In the scene, their characters create a distraction by pretending to be a newly formed K-pop group called Brownie Tuesday. They perform "WAP" as a large production number, which ends as Hsu's character accidentally exposes her genitals.

== Accolades ==
=== Rankings ===
"*" indicates an unordered list.

Selected critical rankings for "WAP"
| Publication | Accolade | Rank | Ref. |
|---|---|---|---|
| BBC | The Best Singles of 2020 | 1 | |
| Billboard | The Best Songs of 2020 | 5 | |
| Billboard | The 20 Best Rap Songs of 2020 | 2 | |
| Billboard | The 25 Best Music Videos of 2020 | 3 | |
| Complex | The Best Songs of 2020 | 5 | |
| Complex | The Best Music Videos of 2020 | 1 | |
| Los Angeles Times | The 50 Best Songs of 2020 | * | |
| The New York Times (Jon Caramanica) | Best Songs of 2020 | 7 | |
| NME | The 50 best songs of 2020 | 1 | |
| Pitchfork | The 100 Best Songs of 2020 | 1 | |
| Pitchfork | The 36 Best Rap Songs of 2020 | * | |
| Pitchfork | The 100 Best Song of the 2020s So Far | 22 | |
| Rolling Stone | The 50 Best Songs of 2020 | 1 | |
| Rolling Stone | The Best Pop Collaborations of 2020 | * | |
| Rolling Stone | The 100 Greatest Music Videos | 93 | |
| Time | The 10 Best Songs of 2020 | 2 | |

=== Industry awards ===
"WAP" notably was not submitted for Grammy consideration. In January 2023, Cardi B said on The Jason Lee Show that the reason was the potential reaction of the internet in case of her victory: "I was afraid that if I win or if I... You know what's so crazy? The internet got me even afraid of winning."

Awards and nominations for "WAP"
| Year | Organization | Award | Result | Ref. |
|---|---|---|---|---|
| 2020 | American Music Awards | Favorite Song – Rap/Hip-Hop | Won | |
| 2020 | American Music Awards | Collaboration of the Year | Nominated | |
| 2020 | ARIA Charts Awards | ARIA Top 50 Singles Chart Number One Awards | Won | |
| 2020 | HipHopDX Awards | Best Hip-Hop Music Video of 2020 | Nominated | |
| 2020 | MTV Video Music Awards | Song of Summer | Nominated | |
| 2020 | MTV Europe Music Awards | Best Video | Nominated | |
| 2020 | MTV Europe Music Awards | Best Collaboration | Nominated | |
| 2020 | NMPA Awards | Gold Single | Won | |
| 2020 | NMPA Awards | 3x Multi-Platinum Single | Won | |
| 2020 | Official Charts Awards | Official Singles Chart Top 100 Number One | Won | |
| 2020 | Official Charts Awards | Official Singles Top 40 Number One | Won | |
| 2020 | People's Choice Awards | Favorite Song | Nominated | |
| 2020 | People's Choice Awards | Favorite Music Video | Nominated | |
| 2020 | People's Choice Awards | Favorite Collaboration | Won | |
| 2020 | Prêmio POP Mais | Hit Internacional | Won | |
| 2020 | Soul Train Music Awards | Rhythm & Bars Award | Nominated | |
| 2021 | GAFFA Awards (Denmark) | Best Foreign Song | Nominated | |
| 2021 | iHeartRadio Music Awards | Best Music Video | Nominated | |
| 2021 | iHeartRadio Music Awards | TikTok Bop of the Year | Nominated | |
| 2021 | ASCAP Rhythm & Soul Music Awards | Winning Songs | Won | |
| 2021 | Official Charts Awards | UK Specialist Number One Award for Streaming Number One | Won | |
| 2021 | Official Charts Awards | UK Specialist Number One Award for Audio Streaming Number One | Won | |
| 2021 | Official Charts Awards | UK Specialist Number One Award for Hip-Hop/R&B Number One | Won | |
| 2021 | Official Charts Awards | UK Specialist Number One Award for Official Irish Singles Number One | Won | |
| 2021 | Billboard Music Awards | Top Rap Song | Nominated | |
| 2021 | Billboard Music Awards | Top Selling Song | Nominated | |
| 2021 | Billboard Music Awards | Top Streaming Song | Nominated | |
| 2021 | MTV Video Music Awards | Video of the Year | Nominated | |
| 2021 | MTV Video Music Awards | Song of the Year | Nominated | |
| 2021 | MTV Video Music Awards | Best Collaboration | Nominated | |
| 2021 | MTV Video Music Awards | Best Hip-Hop | Nominated | |
| 2021 | NMPA Awards | 5x Multi-Platinum Single | Won | |
| 2021 | BET Awards | Song of the Year | Won | |
| 2021 | BET Awards | Best Hip Hop Video | Won | |
| 2021 | BET Awards | Best Collaboration | Won | |
| 2021 | BET Awards | Coca-Cola Viewers' Choice Award | Nominated | |
| 2021 | BMI R&B/Hip-Hop Awards | Most Performed R&B/Hip-Hop Song | Won | |
| 2021 | BET Hip Hop Awards | Song of the Year | Won | |
| 2021 | BET Hip Hop Awards | Best Hip-Hop Video | Won | |
| 2021 | BET Hip Hop Awards | Best Collaboration | Won | |

== Personnel ==
Credits adapted from Tidal.

- Cardi B – vocals, songwriting
- Megan Thee Stallion – vocals, songwriting
- Ayo the Producer – production, songwriting
- Keyz – production, songwriting
- Pardison Fontaine – songwriting
- Frank Ski – songwriting
- Evan LaRay – engineering
- Shawn "Source" Jarrett – engineering
- Leslie Braithwaite – mixing
- Colin Leonard – mastering

== Charts ==
=== Weekly charts ===
Weekly chart performance
| Chart (2020–2021) | Peak position |
|---|---|
| Argentina Hot 100 (Billboard) | 17 |
| Australia (ARIA) | 1 |
| Australia Urban (ARIA) | 1 |
| Austria (Ö3 Austria Top 40) | 8 |
| Belgium (Ultratop 50 Flanders) | 14 |
| Belgium (Ultratop 50 Wallonia) | 41 |
| Brazil (UBC) | 9 |
| Canada Hot 100 (Billboard) | 1 |
| Czech Republic Singles Digital (ČNS IFPI) | 10 |
| Denmark (Tracklisten) | 7 |
| Estonia (Eesti Tipp-40) | 2 |
| Euro Digital Song Sales (Billboard) | 9 |
| Finland (Suomen virallinen lista) | 4 |
| France (SNEP) | 30 |
| Germany (GfK) | 12 |
| Global 200 (Billboard) | 1 |
| Greece International (IFPI) | 1 |
| Hungary (Single Top 40) | 8 |
| Hungary (Stream Top 40) | 2 |
| Iceland (Tónlistinn) | 11 |
| Ireland (IRMA) | 1 |
| Italy (FIMI) | 34 |
| Japan Hot Overseas (Billboard) | 10 |
| Lebanon (Lebanese Top 20) | 19 |
| Lithuania (AGATA) | 1 |
| Malaysia (RIM) | 8 |
| Netherlands (Dutch Top 40 Tipparade) | 1 |
| Netherlands (Single Top 100) | 16 |
| New Zealand (Recorded Music NZ) | 1 |
| Norway (VG-lista) | 2 |
| Portugal (AFP) | 5 |
| Romania (Airplay 100) | 47 |
| Scottish Singles Sales (Official Charts) | 8 |
| Singapore (RIAS) | 4 |
| Slovakia Singles Digital (ČNS IFPI) | 5 |
| South Korea (Gaon) | 121 |
| Spain (PROMUSICAE) | 63 |
| Sweden (Sverigetopplistan) | 6 |
| Switzerland (Schweizer Hitparade) | 5 |
| UK Singles (Official Charts) | 1 |
| UK Hip Hop/R&B (Official Charts) | 1 |
| US Billboard Hot 100 | 1 |
| US Hot R&B/Hip-Hop Songs (Billboard) | 1 |
| US R&B/Hip-Hop Airplay (Billboard) | 3 |
| US Rhythmic Airplay (Billboard) | 1 |
| U.S. Rolling Stone Top 100 | 1 |

=== Monthly charts ===
| Chart (2020) | Peak position |
|---|---|
| Brazil (Top 50 Streaming) | 16 |

=== Year-end charts ===
Year-end chart performance
| Chart (2020) | Position |
|---|---|
| Australia (ARIA) | 19 |
| Austria (Ö3 Austria Top 40) | 53 |
| Belgium (Ultratop Flanders) | 96 |
| Canada (Canadian Hot 100) | 37 |
| Denmark (Tracklisten) | 89 |
| France (SNEP) | 168 |
| Germany (Official German Charts) | 96 |
| Hungary (Single Top 40) | 76 |
| Hungary (Stream Top 40) | 32 |
| Ireland (IRMA) | 16 |
| New Zealand (Recorded Music NZ) | 28 |
| Sweden (Sverigetopplistan) | 77 |
| Switzerland (Schweizer Hitparade) | 60 |
| UK Singles (OCC) | 23 |
| U.S. Billboard Hot 100 | 24 |
| U.S. Hot R&B/Hip-Hop Songs (Billboard) | 10 |
| U.S. Rhythmic (Billboard) | 31 |
| U.S. Rolling Stone Top 100 | 7 |

Year-end chart performance
| Chart (2021) | Position |
|---|---|
| Australia (ARIA) | 49 |
| Global 200 (Billboard) | 42 |
| U.S. Hot R&B/Hip-Hop Songs (Billboard) | 42 |

== Certifications ==
Certifications
| Region | Certification | Certified units/sales |
|---|---|---|
| Australia (ARIA) | 10× Platinum | 700,000^{‡} |
| Austria (IFPI Austria) | Platinum | 30,000^{‡} |
| Belgium (BRMA) | Gold | 20,000^{‡} |
| Brazil (Pro-Música Brasil) | 2× Diamond | 320,000^{‡} |
| Canada (Music Canada) | 9× Platinum | 720,000^{‡} |
| Denmark (IFPI Danmark) | Platinum | 90,000^{‡} |
| France (SNEP) | Diamond | 333,333^{‡} |
| Germany (BVMI) | Gold | 200,000^{‡} |
| Italy (FIMI) | Platinum | 70,000^{‡} |
| New Zealand (RMNZ) | 5× Platinum | 150,000^{‡} |
| Nigeria (RCN) | Gold | 2,500 |
| Norway (IFPI Norway) | Platinum | 60,000^{‡} |
| Poland (ZPAV) | 3× Platinum | 60,000^{‡} |
| Portugal (AFP) | 2× Platinum | 20,000^{‡} |
| Spain (Promusicae) | Gold | 30,000^{‡} |
| United Kingdom (BPI) | 2× Platinum | 1,200,000^{‡} |
| United States (RIAA) | Diamond | 10,000,000^{‡} |
^{‡} Sales+streaming figures based on certification alone.

== Release history ==
Release dates and formats
| Region | Date | Format | Label | Ref. |
|---|---|---|---|---|
| Various | August 6, 2020 | 7-inch vinyl; cassette tape | Warner | |
| Various | August 7, 2020 | Digital download; streaming | Atlantic | |
| Italy | August 7, 2020 | Radio airplay | Warner | |

== Translations ==
On April 15, 2026, Internet personality linguameha translated the first verse of the song to Croatian, garnering 1,000,000 views on Instagram. He later published a full translation of the song.

== See also ==
- List of Billboard Digital Song Sales number ones of 2020
- List of Billboard Global 200 number ones of 2020
- List of Billboard Hot 100 number ones of 2020
- List of Billboard Hot 100 number-one singles of the 2020s
- List of Billboard Hot 100 top-ten singles in 2020
- List of Billboard Streaming Songs number ones of 2020
- List of Canadian Hot 100 number-one singles of 2020
- List of highest-certified singles in Australia
- List of number-one singles of 2020 (Australia)
- List of number-one singles of 2020 (Ireland)
- List of top 10 singles in 2020 (Ireland)
- List of UK Singles Chart number ones of the 2020s
- List of UK top-ten singles in 2020
