= Keyz =

Keyzbaby
- Also known as: Keyzbaby; Keyz The Producer; Keyz
- Born: James Foye III Buffalo, New York
- Genres: Hip hop; R&B; pop
- Occupations: Record producer; songwriter; audio engineer; recording engineer
- Member of: Ayo N Keyz (The Upperclassmen)
- Website: itskeyzbaby.com

James Foye III, professionally known as Keyzbaby, is an American record producer, songwriter, audio engineer and recording engineer from Buffalo, New York. He is one half of Ayo N Keyz (The Upperclassmen), a production team with Ayo the Producer. Keyzbaby has worked with artists such as Chris Brown, Bryson Tiller, K Michelle, Wiz Khalifa, Diddy and Rick Ross.

== Discography ==
| Year | Title | Album | Artist(s) |
|---|---|---|---|
| 2023 | "Ordinary Love" | 7 | VEDO |
| 2023 | "I Need You" (ft. Lecrae) | 7 | VEDO |
| 2023 | "Split" | 7 | VEDO |
| 2023 | "You Don’t Deserve This" | Nü Moon | THEY. |
| 2023 | "BNB" | 1-800-Hit Eazy: Line 2 | Eric Bellinger & Hitmaka |
| 2023 | "Decide" | 1-800-Hit Eazy: Line 2 | Eric Bellinger & Hitmaka |
| 2023 | "Keep Me In Mind" | 1-800-Hit Eazy: Line 2 | Eric Bellinger & Hitmaka |
| 2022 | "Spend It" | What I Didn't Tell You | Coco Jones |
| 2022 | "Fuckin’ Sound" | Candydrip | Lucky Daye |
| 2021 | "What About Us" (ft. Sevyn Streeter) | New Light | Eric Bellinger |
| 2021 | "Tired of Waiting" | New Light | Eric Bellinger |
| 2021 | "After Midnight" | 1-800-Hit Eazy | Eric Bellinger & Hitmaka |
| 2021 | "Hype Beast" | 1-800-Hit Eazy | Eric Bellinger & Hitmaka |
| 2021 | "I Got It" | 1-800-Hit Eazy | Eric Bellinger & Hitmaka |
| 2021 | "Not Like That" | 1-800-Hit Eazy | Eric Bellinger & Hitmaka |
| 2021 | "Passionate" | 1-800-Hit Eazy | Eric Bellinger & Hitmaka |
| 2021 | "Serious" | 1-800-Hit Eazy | Eric Bellinger & Hitmaka |
| 2020 | "Hit Different" | Back Home | Trey Songz |
| 2020 | "Bad" | The Album | Teyana Taylor |
| 2020 | "Lowkey" (feat. Erykah Badu) | The Album | Teyana Taylor |
| 2020 | "Shoot It Up" (featuring Big Sean) | The Album | Teyana Taylor |
| 2020 | "Wrong Bitch" | The Album | Teyana Taylor |
| 2020 | "이데아 (IDEA:理想)" | Never Gonna Dance Again: Act 2 | Taemin |
| 2020 | "WAP" (feat. Megan Thee Stallion) | Am I the Drama? | Cardi B |
| 2019 | "Trust Issues / Act In" | Indigo | Chris Brown |
| 2019 | "CS3 Intro" | Cuffing Season 3 | Eric Bellinger |
| 2019 | "Heaven Sent" | Cuffing Season 3 | Eric Bellinger |
| 2019 | "Material" | Cuffing Season 3 | Eric Bellinger |
| 2019 | "Fake Love" (feat. Queen Naija) | TM104: The Legend of the Snowman | Jeezy |
| 2019 | "Don't Forget" | TM104: The Legend of the Snowman | Jeezy |
| 2019 | "All Night Long" (feat. Trey Songz) | 650Luc: Gangsta Grillz (with DJ Drama) | YFN Lucci |
| 2019 | "Midnight Hour (Four Tet Remix)" (feat. Boyz Noise and Ty Dolla Sign) | | Skrillex |
| 2019 | "Summertime" | Walk with Me | Rotimi |
| 2019 | "I Can't Blame You" | Walk with Me | Rotimi |
| 2019 | "Legend" | Walk with Me | Rotimi |
| 2019 | "A Million" (feat. Quavo) | Non-album release | Veronica Vega |
| 2019 | "Only You" | Trouble in Paradise | Elhae |
| 2019 | "Nobody Else" (feat. Jacquees and Ty Dolla Sign) | Non-album release | Nick Cannon |
| 2019 | "Madden Flow" | Non-album release | Pardison Fontaine |
| 2019 | "Changes" | Anonymous | Blackbear |
| 2019 | "No Games" (feat. Britanny B./Bee-B) | The Rebirth 2 | Eric Bellinger |
| 2018 | "Kisses On Christmas" | Eazy Christmas | Eric Bellinger |
| 2018 | "Top 10" (feat. Jeremih) | 28 | Trey Songz |
| 2018 | "FYT" (feat. French Montana) | Mih-Ty | Jeremih and Ty Dolla Sign (MihTy) |
| 2018 | "Goin Thru Some Thangz" | Mih-Ty | Jeremih and Ty Dolla Sign (MihTy) |
| 2018 | "The Light" | Mih-Ty | Jeremih and Ty Dolla Sign (MihTy) |
| 2018 | "These Day" | Mih-Ty | Jeremih and Ty Dolla Sign (MihTy) |
| 2018 | "Meditate" | Meditation Music | Eric Bellinger |
| 2018 | "Bickenhead" | Invasion of Privacy | Cardi B |
| 2018 | "Ain't Ya Ex" (feat. Mila J and Tink) | Eazy Call | Eric Bellinger |
| 2018 | "Money Float" | Eazy Call | Eric Bellinger |
| 2018 | "Back On My Shit" | The Sunset Tapes: A Cool Tape Story | Jaden Smith |
| 2018 | "Same Time" | Empire: Original Soundtrack From Season 5 | Empire |
| 2018 | "Automatic" | Ready To Love - EP | The Bonfyre |
| 2018 | "Do You Miss It" | First Day of Summer | Summerella |
| 2018 | "Body Body Body" | Self Promotion - EP | Wale |
| 2018 | "Cassius (EXCELLENCY)" (feat. Dj Money) | Self Promotion - EP | Wale |
| 2017 | "This X-Mas" (feat. Ella Mai) | Heartbreak On A Full Moon (Deluxe) | Chris Brown |
| 2017 | "Covered in You" | Heartbreak On A Full Moon | Chris Brown |
| 2017 | "To My Bed" | Heartbreak On A Full Moon | Chris Brown |
| 2017 | "Teach Me A Lesson" | True to Self | Bryson Tiller |
| 2017 | "Get Mine" (feat. Young Thug) | Non-album release | Bryson Tiller |
| 2017 | "Oh Yeah" (feat. French Montana) | I Still Am | Yo Gotti |
| 2017 | "Jui Jitsu" (feat. Chris Brown) | Non-album release | OneInThe4Rest |
| 2017 | "Kitchen Table" | Jeep Music Vol. 1 | Rotimi |
| 2017 | "Anything You Want" (feat. Wiz Khalifa, Jeremih and Ty Dolla Sign) | Girl Disrupted | Sevyn Streeter |
| 2017 | "Soon As I Get Home" | Girl Disrupted | Sevyn Streeter |
| 2017 | "Something" | Aura II | Elhae |
| 2017 | "Bang Your Line" | Aura II | Elhae |
| 2017 | "You" | Aura II | Elhae |
| 2017 | "Circa 09'" | Aura II | Elhae |
| 2017 | "Juicy Sweatsuits" (feat. Juicy J) | Digital Druglord | Blackbear |
| 2017 | "How (Interlude)" | Diamonds | Verse Simmonds |
| 2017 | "Shoulda Woulda Could" | Diamonds | Verse Simmonds |
| 2017 | "Feelins" | Diamonds | Verse Simmonds |
| 2017 | "Diamonds" | Diamonds | Verse Simmonds |
| 2016 | "404 (Intro)" | All Have Fallen | Elhae |
| 2016 | "Doesn't Matter" (feat. Kehlani) | All Have Fallen | Elhae |
| 2016 | "Don't Walk Away" | All Have Fallen | Elhae |
| 2016 | "Needs" | All Have Fallen | Elhae |
| 2016 | "478(Outro)" | All Have Fallen | Elhae |
| 2016 | "Hartley Bridge" | All Have Fallen | Elhae |
| 2016 | "Pronouns" | All Have Fallen | Elhae |
| 2016 | "Sex for Christmas" | Eazy Christmas | Eric Bellinger |
| 2016 | "Drive By" | Eric B for President: Term 1 | Eric Bellinger |
| 2015 | "Self Righteous" | Trapsoul (Deluxe) | Bryson Tiller |
| 2015 | "Open Interlude" | Trapsoul | Bryson Tiller |
| 2015 | "Proof" | Royalty | Chris Brown |
| 2015 | "iPod on Shuffle" | Cuffing Season | Eric Bellinger |
| 2015 | "The Summary" | Cuffing Season | Eric Bellinger |
| 2015 | "Anything" | Genic | Namie Amuro |
| 2015 | "Harlem" | MMM | Puff Daddy and The Family |
| 2014 | "Deserve" | Rehab | Teairra Mari |
| 2013 | "Bow Down / I Been On" | Promo single | Beyoncé |
