= True to Self =

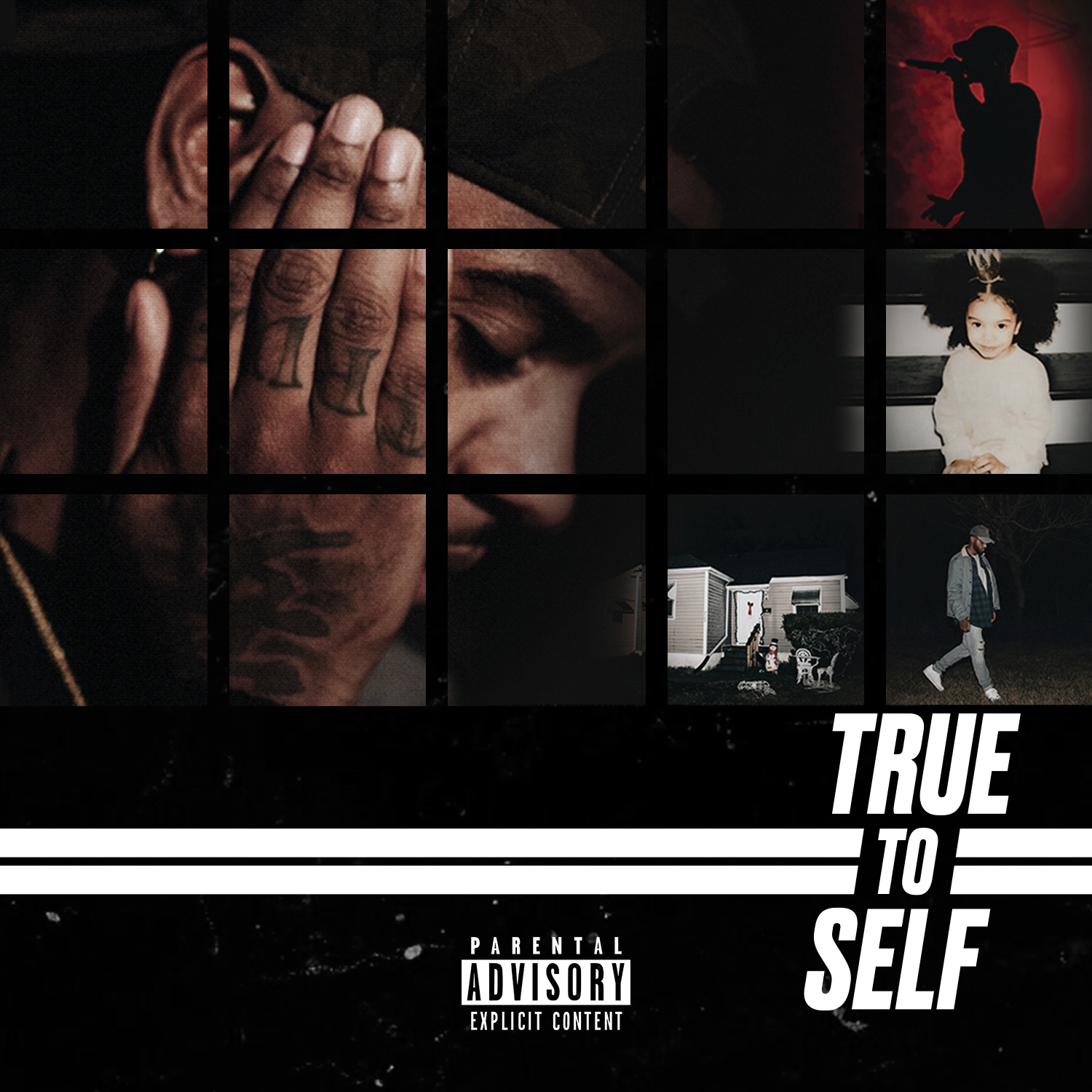

Studio album by Bryson Tiller
- Released: May 26, 2017
- Recorded: 2016–2017
- Genres: R&B; hip-hop; trap
- Length: 58:19
- Label: RCA
- Producers: Allen Ritter; Ayo; Boi-1da; FrancisGotHeat; Frank Dukes; Gravez; IAMNOBODI; Illmind; Hollywood Hot Sauce; J-Louis; Keyz; Mahxie; NES; Xeryus G; Pro Logic; Soundz; Trvp Vee; Skyz Muzik; Swiff D; Teddy Walton; T-Minus; WondaGurl; Wow Jones

Bryson Tiller chronology
Trapsoul (2015)	True to Self (2017)	Anniversary (2020)

Singles from True to Self
- 1. "Somethin Tells Me" Released: May 11, 2017; 2. "Run Me Dry" Released: July 25, 2017

True to Self is the second studio album by American singer-songwriter Bryson Tiller. It was released on May 26, 2017, by RCA Records. Recording sessions took place from 2016 to 2017, while the production was handled by several producers from Teddy Walton, J-Louis, Mahxie, NES, Boi-1da, Frank Dukes, Illmind, Hollywood Hot Sauce, Keyz, Soundz, T-Minus and Wondagurl, among others.

The album was supported by the two singles: "Somethin Tells Me" and "Run Me Dry". In August 2017, Tiller started the Set It Off tour to promote the album. True to Self debuted at number one on the Billboard 200 (Tiller's only album to debut within that position), selling 107,000 album-equivalent units and 47,000 copies in the first week.

== Background and release ==
On January 17, 2017, Tiller announced that he was working on his second album, titled True to Self. While talking about the recording of the album in an interview with Rolling Stone, Tiller said; "I posted something on Instagram like, "album almost done", then I met this producer named Nes, and the way he produces his beats just changed everything. So I started my whole album over."

On May 11, 2017, he revealed the album's artwork, announcing that it would be released on June 23; also he later released three new songs, titled "Honey", "Somethin Tells Me" and "Get Mine"; the latter features American rapper Young Thug. On May 23, Tiller posted the complete tracklist on his Instagram account. On May 26, he released True to Self a month early before the intended release. In an interview with Billboard, Tiller explained the motivation behind the album's early release; "I can't take the credit for that. It was just my manager; it was his plan [to] drop it a month early. I've been ready to get the music to the fans as soon as possible, so why not?" In a 2020 interview with Billboard, he stated that he did not put energy or time into the album because he did not want to make or release the album due to legal and personal matters.

== Promotion ==
The album's lead single, "Somethin Tells Me", was released on May 11, 2017. The music video for the song premiered on Tiller's Vevo channel on May 25, 2017. The song has peaked at number 74 on the US Billboard Hot 100. "Run Me Dry" was sent to the rhythmic contemporary radio as the album's second single on July 25, 2017. The single's music video premiered on September 12, 2017. It has peaked at number 91 on the Billboard Hot 100. Tiller also released a music video for the song "Self-Made".

In May 2017, Tiller announced the dates for the Set It Off tour in North America across the United States and Canada, which started on August 3, 2017. In North America he was joined by R&B singer H.E.R. and record producer Metro Boomin. The second leg of the tour was announced in July 2017 taking place across Europe, which started on October 17, 2017. In Europe he was joined by R&B singer SZA. In September 2017, Tiller announced the third leg of the tour in New Zealand and Australia, which started on September 22.

== Critical reception ==
Professional ratings
Aggregate scores
Source	Rating
Metacritic	63/100
Review scores
Source	Rating
AllMusic	3/5 stars
Clash	6/10
Exclaim!	6/10
Pitchfork	6.6/10
XXL	4/5

True to Self received generally favorable reviews from music critics. At Metacritic, which assigns a normalized rating out of 100 to reviews from mainstream publications, the album received an average score of 63, based on six reviews.

== Commercial performance ==
True to Self debuted at number one on the US Billboard 200, earning 107,000 album-equivalent units (including 47,000 copies as pure album sales) in its first week, while also ousting rock band Linkin Park's album, One More Light, from the top position. This became Tiller's sole US number one debut on the chart. In its second week, the album dropped to number 13 on the chart, earning an additional 29,000 units. In its third week, the album dropped to number 22 on the chart, earning 20,000 more units. On August 3, 2018, the album was certified gold by the Recording Industry Association of America (RIAA) for combined sales and album-equivalent units of over 500,000 units in the United States.

== Track listing ==
Credits were adapted from Tidal.

True to Self
No.	Title	Writer(s)	Producer(s)	Length
1.	"Rain on Me (Intro)"	Bryson Tiller; Philip Coleman, Jr.; Teddy Walton; Brian Morgan; John Pastorius	NES; Walton	2:25
2.	"No Longer Friends"	Tiller; Steve Thornton; Craig Brockman; Charlene Keys; Nisan Stewart; Christopher Justice; Hector Troy	Swiff D; Gravez	2:14
3.	"Don't Get Too High"	Tiller; Ricki G; W Brown; Coleman, Jr.; Jacques Webster	Skyz Muzik; NES	3:29
4.	"Blowing Smoke"	Tiller; Ebony Oshunrinde; Francis Nguyen-Tran	WondaGurl; FrancisGotHeat	3:00
5.	"We Both Know"	Tiller; Coleman, Jr.	NES	2:40
6.	"You Got It"	Tiller; Paul Dawson	Hollywood Hot Sauce	2:56
7.	"In Check"	Tiller; Joshua Louis Huizar; Robert Watson; Gordon Chambers; Barry Eastmond	J-Louis; Rob Holladay^{[b]}; Wow Jones^{[b]}	3:18
8.	"Self-Made"	Tiller; Coleman, Jr.; Konstandinos Dimopoulos; Stavros Xarchakos	NES	2:47
9.	"Run Me Dry"	Tiller; Matthew Samuels; Allen Ritter	Boi-1da; Ritter^{[a]}	2:49
10.	"High Stakes"	Tiller; Coleman, Jr.; LeRoy Bell; Thomas Bell; Casey James	NES	3:02
11.	"Rain Interlude"	Tiller; Coleman, Jr.; Walton	NES; Walton	0:46
12.	"Teach Me a Lesson"	Tiller; Austin Owens; Marsha Ambrosius; Vidal Davis; André Harris	Ayo; Xeryus; Keyz^{[a]}	3:27
13.	"Stay Blessed"	Tiller; Coleman, Jr.; Windley; Mary Blige; Sean Combs; Michael Deric; John Mercer; Bruce Miller; John Williams	NES; Wow Jones	4:06
14.	"Money Problems / Benz Truck"	Tiller; Samuels; Ramon Ibanga, Jr.; Andrew Franklin; Mahxie Music; Watson	Part 1 produced by Pro Logic; Mahxie Part 2 produced by Boi-1da; Illmind; Rob Holladay^{[b]}	4:59
15.	"Set It Off"	Tiller; Walton; Ricki G; Faith Evans; Carl Thompson	Walton; IAMNOBODI	3:37
16.	"Nevermind This Interlude"	Tiller; Kenneth Coby	Soundz	2:14
17.	"Before You Judge"	Tiller; Coleman, Jr.; Nathaniel Chase; Edward Fletcher; Melvin Glover; O'Shea Jackson; Sylvia Robinson	NES	4:46
18.	"Somethin Tells Me"	Tiller; Tyler Williams	T-Minus	3:14
19.	"Always (Outro)"	Tiller; Coleman, Jr.; Adam Feeney; Watson; Windley; Robert Kelly	NES; Frank Dukes; Rob Holladay^{[b]}; Wow Jones^{[b]}	2:30
Total length:				58:19

Notes

- ^{^[a]} signifies a co-producer
- ^{^[b]} signifies an additional producer

Sample credits

- "Rain on Me (Intro)" contains a sample of SWV's "Rain", and Drake's Brand New.
- "No Longer Friends" contains a sample of Tweet's "My Place".
- "We Both Know" contains a sample of Changing Faces' "Stroke You Up".
- "In Check" contains a sample of Brandy, Tamia, Gladys Knight, and Chaka Khan's "Missing You".
- "Self-Made" contains a sample of Stavros Xarchakos' "Palikari Dipsasmeno".
- "High Stakes" contains a sample of The Spinners' "(Do It Do It) No One Does It Better".
- "Teach Me a Lesson" contains a sample of Marsha Ambrosius' "Your Hands".
- "Stay Blessed" contains a sample of Mary J. Blige's "Don’t Go".
- "Set It Off" contains a sample of Faith Evans' "You Are My Joy (Interlude)".
- "Before You Judge" contains excerpts of Ice Cube's "Check Yo Self (Remix)".
- "Don't Get Too High" contains an excerpt of Travis Scott's "Backyard" from his 2014 mixtape Days Before Rodeo.
- "Always (Outro)" contains a sample of Changing Faces' "Foolin’ Around".

== Personnel ==
Credits adapted from Tidal.

Performers

- Bryson Tiller – primary artist

Technical

- Michael "Black Mic" Williams – audio engineer (all tracks)
- Fabian Marasciullo – mixing engineer (all tracks)
- McCoy Socalgargoyle – assistant mixing engineer (all tracks)
- Colin Leonard – mastering engineer (all tracks)
- Matthew Samuels – recording engineer (track 14)
- Ramon Ibanga – recording engineer (track 14)
- Tyler Williams – recording engineer (track 18)

Instruments

- Wow Jones – keyboard (tracks 7, 11, 13, 19)
- Fingazz – talkbox (track 12)

Production

- NES – producer (tracks 1, 3, 5, 8, 10, 11, 13, 17, 19)
- Teddy Walton – producer (tracks 1, 11, 15)
- Swiff D – producer (track 2)
- Gravez – producer (track 2)
- WondaGurl – producer (track 4)
- FrancisGotHeat – producer (track 4)
- Hollywood Hot Sauce – producer (track 6)
- J-Louis – producer (track 7)
- Rob Holladay – additional producer (tracks 7, 14, 19)
- Skyz Muzik– producer (track 3)
- Wow Jones – additional producer (tracks 7, 19), producer (track 13)
- Boi-1da – producer (tracks 9, 14)
- Allen Ritter – co-producer (track 9)
- Ayo – producer (track 12)
- Xeryus – producer (track 12)
- Keyz – co-producer (track 12)
- Mahxie – producer (track 14)
- Pro Logic – producer (track 14)
- Illmind – producer (track 14)
- IAMNOBODI – producer (track 15)
- Soundz – producer (track 16)
- T-Minus – producer (track 18)
- Frank Dukes – producer (track 19)

== Charts ==
=== Weekly charts ===
Chart (2017)	Peak position
Australian Albums (ARIA)	12
Belgian Albums (Ultratop Flanders)	65
Belgian Albums (Ultratop Wallonia)	175
Canadian Albums (Billboard)	4
Danish Albums (Hitlisten)	30
Dutch Albums (Album Top 100)	16
French Albums (SNEP)	123
New Zealand Albums (RMNZ)	12
Swedish Albums (Sverigetopplistan)	42
Swiss Albums (Schweizer Hitparade)	99
UK Albums (Official Charts)	11
US Billboard 200	1
US Top R&B/Hip-Hop Albums (Billboard)	1

=== Year-end charts ===
Chart (2017)	Position
US Billboard 200	96
US Top R&B/Hip-Hop Albums (Billboard)	37

== Certifications ==
Region	Certification	Certified units/sales
Canada (Music Canada)	Gold	40,000^{‡}
New Zealand (RMNZ)	Gold	7,500^{‡}
United Kingdom (BPI)	Silver	60,000^{‡}
United States (RIAA)	Platinum	1,000,000^{‡}
^{‡} Sales+streaming figures based on certification alone.
