= Self-Made (song) =

Song by Bryson Tiller

from the album True to Self
- Released: May 26, 2017
- Genre: Hip-hop; trap
- Length: 2:47
- Label: RCA
- Songwriters: Bryson Tiller; Philip Coleman, Jr.; Konstandinos Dimopoulos; Stavros Xarchakos
- Producer: NES

"Self-Made" is a song by American singer Bryson Tiller. The track appeared on Tiller's second studio album, True to Self, which was released on May 26, 2017. It was written by Tiller, Philip Coleman, Jr., Konstandinos Dimopoulos and Stavros Xarchakos. The song received positive response from music critics, who praised Tiller's rapping skills. The black-and-white music video for the song, directed by Colin Tilley, premiered on October 3, 2017. "Self-Made" debuted at number 85 on the Billboard Hot 100 chart.

== Background and release ==
It just sucks whenever you work so hard to do something, and then a lot of people try to take credit for it. That’s not only what the song’s about, though. It’s about how sometimes you deserve to go ball and splurge on yourself.

— Tiller on the meaning of "Self-Made" in an interview with GQ.

On January 17, 2017, Tiller announced that he is working on his second album, titled True to Self. On May 11, 2017, he revealed the album's artwork, announcing that it would be released on June 23. On May 23, Tiller posted the complete tracklist on his Instagram account, and released the album on May 26, a month early before the intended release. Tiller co-wrote "Self-Made" with Philip Coleman, Jr., Konstandinos Dimopoulos and Stavros Xarchakos, with production handled by NES.

== Critical reception ==
Siena Yates from The New Zealand Herald called it one of the best songs from the album, also praising the production of the song and Tiller's rapping skills. Ryan B. Patrick of Exclaim! wrote that although the song "rides a strong rap flow and hits hard in moment, it leaves your consciousness just as fast as it arrived". Music Times' Dayna Haffenden noted that the song "sounds like the hidden aggression that any normal artist goes through as they figure themselves out", as well as writing that "Tiller's flow gives off that "hardcore rapper" appeal".

== Commercial performance ==
"Self-Made" debuted and peaked at number 85 on the Billboard Hot 100 chart on June 17, 2017. It has sold over 500,000 copies and was certified gold by the RIAA in February 2018.

== Music video ==
Tiller standing on a BMW i8 in the music video for "Self-Made".

The music video for the song, directed by Colin Tilley, premiered via Tiller's Vevo channel on October 3, 2017. The black-and-white video starts with Tiller getting out of the house and performing the song in the hood full of cars and women as it is raining. He is also seen in a room sitting on the bed surrounded by women. The video also features Tiller standing on the top of a moving BMW i8 and riding a Jet Ski through the streets as he gets chased by police.

== Live performances ==
On July 7, 2017, Tiller performed "Self-Made" during his set at the Wireless Festival in London. On August 14, 2017, he performed the song on the Jimmy Kimmel Live!. On November 11, 2017, he performed it at the BBC 1Xtra Live in Manchester. The song was also part of Tiller's Set It Off Tour (2017).

== Charts ==
=== Weekly charts ===
Chart (2017)	Peak position
Canada Hot 100 (Billboard)	71
US Billboard Hot 100	85
US Hot R&B/Hip-Hop Songs (Billboard)	35

== Certifications ==
Region	Certification	Certified units/sales
United States (RIAA)	Gold	500,000^{‡}
^{‡} Sales+streaming figures based on certification alone.
