= Blink Twice (Rose Gray song) =

2026 single by Rose Gray

Single by Rose Gray
- Released: 24 September 2026
- Genre: Dance-pop
- Length: 3:20
- Label: Polydor
- Songwriters: Rose Gray; Justin Tranter; Kevin Hickey
- Producer: Zhone

Rose Gray singles chronology
"Just Be Bodies" (2026)	"Blink Twice" (2026)

Music video
- "Blink Twice" on YouTube

"Blink Twice" is a song recorded by the English singer-songwriter Rose Gray. It was released by Polydor Records on 24 September 2026 as the third single from her upcoming second studio album. A dance-pop song, Gray co-wrote "Blink Twice" with Justin Tranter and Kevin Hickey, with Zhone handling the production of the track.

The lyrical content of the song dissects how quickly life moves, specifically for Gray, whose career received wider recognition in the period around writing it. It also addresses a mix of excitement and anxiety that she felt around the time. A music video accompanied the song, which was shot a week prior to its release. "Blink Twice" features on the soundtrack for the video game EA Sports FC 27 and charted at number 90 on the Lithuanian Airplay charts.

== Background and release ==
Gray released her debut studio album, Louder, Please, in January 2025. The theme of the album was shaped by Gray's adoration of nightlife and clubbing in London. After touring globally in promotion of the record, she began writing and recording new material in the studio and "Club to Your Arms" and "Just Be Bodies" were eventually released in mid-2026 as the first two singles from the record. Gray felt the songs and further upcoming releases to be a continuation of Louder, Please as opposed to a "new era". "Blink Twice" was released on 24 September following a "first play" on BBC Radio 1 from presenter Jack Saunders. It was accompanied by a music video shot a week prior to its release. "Blink Twice" was later included on the soundtrack for video game EA Sports FC 27.

== Composition and lyrics ==
Gray found it difficult to place "Blink Twice" within one musical genre, citing Primal Scream, Basement Jaxx and Britpop as her inspirations whilst making the song. She co-wrote the song with Justin Tranter and Kevin Hickey, with Zhone handling the production. Gray praised Tranter, who has been the co-executive producer for Gray's upcoming second album. She felt Tranter understood the kind of music Gray wants to make since they consume the same media, as well as citing them as a mentor for her in the music industry.

The lyrical content of "Blink Twice" dissects how quickly life moves, specifically for Gray, whose career received wider recognition in the period around writing the song. It also addresses a mix of excitement and anxiety that she felt around the time. Of "Blink Twice", Gray said: "God, I love this song. It's all chaos, love and emotion. I've been feeling so alive lately, more than ever".

== Credits and personnel ==
Credits adapted from Spotify.

- Rose Gray – vocals, songwriting
- Justin Tranter – songwriting
- Kevin Hickey – songwriting
- Zhone – production, programming, keyboard, bass, drums
- Tom Norris – mixing engineer
- Victor Verpillat – additional mixing engineer
- Idania Valencia – mastering engineer

== Charts ==
Chart performance for "Blink Twice"
Chart (2026)	Peak position
Lithuania Airplay (TopHit)	90

== Release history ==
Region	Date	Format	Label	Ref.
Various	24 September 2026	Digital download; streaming	Polydor Records	
