= Free (Kid Cudi album) =

Studio album by Kid Cudi
- Released: August 22, 2025
- Recorded: 2024–2025
- Genres: Pop; alternative rock
- Length: 40:56
- Labels: Wicked Awesome; Republic
- Producers: Beau Nox; Ryland Blackinton; Bnyx; Ryan Buendia; Russ Chell; Dan Crean; Noah Goldstein; Grades; Jean Baptiste; Kid Cudi; Elliot Kozel; Matty Spats; Jake Miller; Ramii; Karl Rubin; Dave Sitek; Justin Tranter; Shawn Wasabi; Zach Ess

Kid Cudi chronology
Insano (Nitro Mega) (2024)	Free (2025)	Have U Bn 2 Heaven @ Nite? (2026)

Singles from Free
- 1. "Neverland" Released: May 9, 2025; 2. "Grave" Released: July 12, 2025; 3. "Mr. Miracle" Released: August 18, 2025

Free is the eleventh studio album by American musician Kid Cudi. It was released on August 22, 2025, via Wicked Awesome and Republic Records. Production was handled by Cudi himself, along with BNYX®, Dan Crean, DJ Replay, and others. The album was preceded by three singles, "Neverland", "Grave" and "Mr. Miracle". "Neverland" was accompanied by a short film directed by Ti West, while the music video for "Grave" was directed by Samuel Bayer.

Serving as Cudi's first pop record, Free is a concept album exploring Cudi's liberation from both his mental health struggles and the constraints of major record deals and contracts. The album received mixed reviews from critics, who praised its joyful tone and production while criticizing the songwriting and perceived inconsistency in quality.

== Background and conception ==
Beginning his career with the Man on the Moon series in 2009, Cudi established himself as one of the only rap artists at the time unafraid to confront mental health in his music. The first installment in the series, The End of Day, was a concept album about his mental-health struggles, primarily during childhood, and his reliance on dreams as an escape, until recurring nightmares began disrupting that peace. Its follow-up, The Legend of Mr. Rager, detailed how drug and alcohol abuse became his way of coping as those nightmares became more frequent, and how his alter-ego Mr. Rager was slowly pulling him toward self-destruction. Mental health remained a consistent theme across his music, with albums such as Speedin' Bullet 2 Heaven and Passion, Pain & Demon Slayin' revisiting said themes. In October 2016, Cudi went to rehab, and a month later announced he was leaving, stating he was feeling "great" and better than he ever had.

After the mixed reception to Insano and Insano (Nitro Mega), both released in 2024 and largely departing from his signature mental health themes, Cudi hinted at new music on April 22, 2025, teasing a lead single titled "Neverland." On May 9, 2025, the single was released, accompanied by a post on X in which Cudi described the forthcoming album as "a pop album. The Cudi version of pop." On July 9, 2025, Cudi formally announced Free with a confirmed release date of August 22 and revealed the cover art, stating: "I wanted something that really expressed freedom, so the concept of me leaping into the clouds made so much sense. Inspired by The Truman Show." Two days later, the Samuel Bayer-directed video for "Grave" was released, and on July 11, 2025, Cudi announced his marriage to fashion designer Lola Abecassis Sartore, which had taken place on June 28, 2025 in the South of France.

Cudi confirmed via X that the album would contain no features, saying he wanted to keep listeners fully engaged by himself, and that he had no interest in working with artists he had grown distant from, writing: "There are people I've had on my albums that I haven't talked to in years. Didn't promote the album, just went ghost." The memoir Cudi: The Memoir followed on August 12, 2025, and after the release of the third single, "Mr. Miracle," on August 18, 2025, Free officially released on August 22, 2025.

== Track listing ==
Track listing adapted from Apple Music.

Free track listing
No.	Title	Writer(s)	Producer(s)	Length
1.	"Echoes of the Present"	Scott Mescudi	Kid Cudi	2:48
2.	"Neverland"	Mescudi; Daniel Crean; Rami Eadeh; Jean-Baptiste Kouame; Shawn Serrano; Matthew Spatola; Cleo Tighe; Justin Tranter	Kid Cudi; Tranter; Crean; Shawn Wasabi; Ramii; Matty Spats	3:56
3.	"Mr. Miracle"	Mescudi; Christian Astrop; Crean; Kouame; Serrano; Tranter	Kid Cudi; Tranter; Crean; Wasabi	3:10
4.	"Opiate"	Mescudi; David Sitek	Kid Cudi; Sitek	2:56
5.	"Deep Diving"	Mescudi; Bianca Atterberry; Ryan Buendia; Kouame; Karl Rubin	Kid Cudi; Jean Baptiste; Rubin; Buendia	2:32
6.	"Truman Show"	Mescudi; Brandon Colbein; Crean; Serrano; Tranter	Kid Cudi; Tranter; Crean; Wasabi^{[p]}	3:42
7.	"Submarine"	Mescudi; Atterberry; Russell Chell; Kouame; Serrano; Tranter	Kid Cudi; Tranter; Wasabi^{[p]}; Chell	3:58
8.	"Ashes"	Mescudi; Astrop; Zachary Seman; Daniel Traynor	Kid Cudi; Beau Nox; Grades; Zach Ess	1:44
9.	"Grave"	Mescudi; Atterberry; Chell; Kouame; Serrano; Tranter	Kid Cudi; Tranter; Wasabi; Chell	3:11
10.	"Past Life"	Mescudi; Astrop; Atterberry; Ryland Blackinton; Eren Cannata; Kouame; Naji Lomax; Tranter	Kid Cudi; Tranter; Cannata; Blackinton	2:29
11.	"Picnic In Paris"	Mescudi; Crean; Eadeh; Serrano; Ali Tamposi; Tranter	Kid Cudi; Tranter; Crean; Wasabi; Ramii	3:16
12.	"Stargazing"	Mescudi; Astrop; Seman; Traynor	Kid Cudi; Beau Nox; Grades; Ess	2:55
13.	"Salt Water"	Mescudi; Crean; Noah Goldstein; Kouame; Elliot Kozel; Jake Miller; Benjamin Saint Fort; Tranter	Mescudi; Bnyx; Kozel; Miller; Goldstein	4:15
Total length:				40:56

=== Note ===
- ^{^[p]} signifies a primary and vocal producer.

== Personnel ==
Credits adapted from Tidal.

=== Musicians ===
- Kid Cudi – programming (all tracks), vocals (tracks 2–13), background vocals (2)
- Justin Tranter – background vocals (2), programming (3, 6, 7, 9–11)
- Cleo Tighe – background vocals (2)
- Shawn Wasabi – keyboards, percussion, programming (3, 6, 7, 9, 11); drums (3, 6, 7, 11)
- Dan Crean – guitar, programming (3, 6, 11)
- Dave Sitek – programming (4)
- Jean Baptiste – programming (5)
- Karl Rubin – programming (5)
- Ryan Buendia – programming (5)
- Russ Chell – bass, guitar, programming (7, 9); keyboards (7)
- Grades – bass, drums, keyboards, percussion, programming, strings (8, 12); horn (8)
- Zach Ess – bass, drums, keyboards, percussion, programming, strings (8, 12); horn (8)
- Beau Nox – guitar, programming (8, 12); bass (8), percussion (12)
- Lux Cannata – background vocals (10, 13)
- Ryland Blackinton – drum programming, guitar, programming, synthesizer (10)
- Eren Cannata – programming (10)
- Ramii – programming (11)
- Ceo Cannata – background vocals (13)
- Bnyx – programming (13)
- Elliot Kozel – programming (13)
- Jake Miller – programming (13)
- Noah Goldstein – programming (13)

=== Technical ===
- Alex Ghenea – mixing (1, 3–13)
- Serban Ghenea – mixing (2)
- Chris Athens – mastering
- Iain Findlay – engineering (1)
- Shawn Wasabi – engineering (3, 6, 7, 9, 11)
- Dan Crean – engineering (3)
- Dave Sitek – engineering (4)
- Anthony Kronfle – engineering (5, 12, 13)
- Grades – engineering (8, 12)
- Zach Ess – engineering (8, 12)
- Russ Chell – engineering (9)
- Bryce Bordone – additional mixing (2)

== Charts ==
Chart performance for Free
Chart (2025)	Peak position
French Albums (SNEP)	180
US Billboard 200	192
