= Jade Thirlwall =

English singer (born 1992)

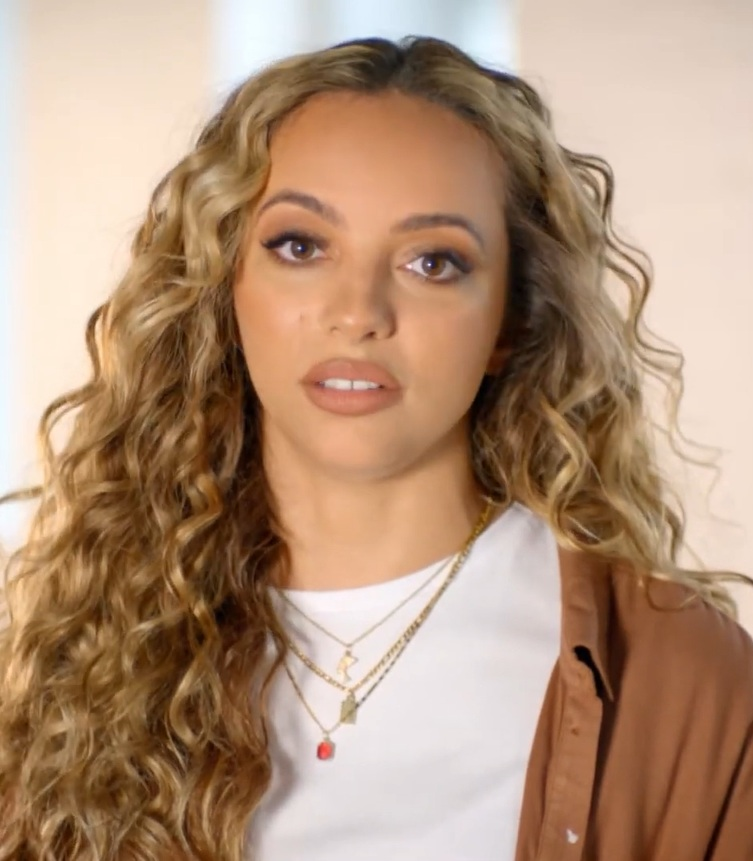
- Thirlwall in 2020

Background information
- Born: Jade Amelia Thirlwall; 26 December 1992 (age 33); South Shields, Tyne and Wear, England
- Genres: Pop; disco; R&B
- Occupation: Singer
- Instrument: Vocals
- Works: Solo discography; Little Mix discography; filmography
- Years active: 2008–present
- Label: RCA
- Member of: Little Mix
- Partner: Jordan Stephens (2020–2026)
- Website: jadeofficial.com

Jade Amelia Thirlwall (born 26 December 1992), known mononymously as Jade (stylised in all caps), is an English singer. Her music career began at the age of 15, when she auditioned for The X Factor on three occasions before rising to prominence as a member of the girl group Little Mix. Formed during the show's eighth series, Little Mix became the first group to win the competition, and together went on to release six studio albums and amassed nineteen UK top-ten singles, five of which reached number one. Before going into hiatus in 2022, they became the first girl group to win the Brit Award for British Group.

In 2022, Thirlwall signed a solo record deal with RCA Records and released her debut single, "Angel of My Dreams" in 2024, which reached number seven on the UK Singles Chart and was nominated for Song of the Year at the 2025 Brit Awards. Her debut solo studio album That's Showbiz Baby! was released on 12 September 2025 to critical acclaim, and debuted at number three on the UK Albums Chart. It spawned the further singles "Fantasy", "FUFN", "Plastic Box", and "Unconditional", which all reached the top 60 of the UK Singles Chart.

In addition to her solo work, Thirlwall has co-written songs for various artists through her publishing deal with Sony/ATV Music. Known for her political and social activism, she is an advocate for LGBTQ+ rights and an ambassador for Stonewall. Her involvement with charity work earned her the Gay Times Honour for Allyship in 2021 and 2025. She won Best Pop Act at the 2025 Brit Awards; making her the first former girl band member to win a solo Brit Award. In 2024, she received the Trailblazer Award at the Rolling Stone UK awards.

== Early life ==
Jade Amelia Thirlwall was born on 26 December 1992 in South Shields, Tyne and Wear, England, to parents Norma Badwi and James Thirlwall. She has an older brother. She is of Egyptian and Yemeni descent on her mother's side and English descent on her father's side. She identifies herself as mixed-race, and has been making efforts to reconnect with her Arab heritage and learn the Arabic language in hopes of travelling more to the Middle East.

As a child, Thirlwall attended an Islamic school to learn how to read and write in Arabic and attended church. During her teenage years, she studied pop vocals and cosmetic makeup and completed three A-levels at South Tyneside College. In 1943, Thirlwall's grandfather Mohammed, a devout Muslim, emigrated from Yemen to South Shields, where he met Jade's grandmother, his wife Amelia who was from Egypt.

== Music career ==
=== 2008–2022: Career beginnings and Little Mix ===
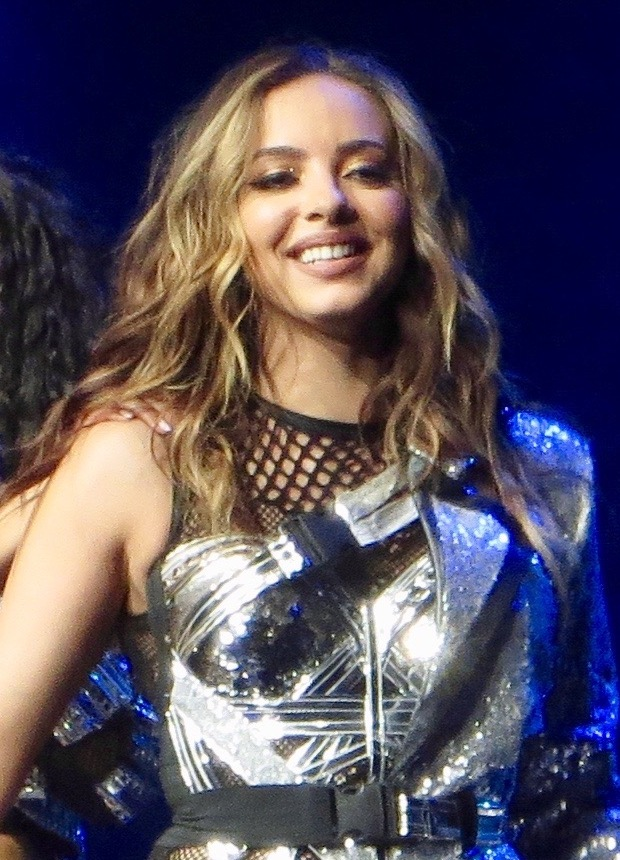
Thirwall performing as part of Little Mix in 2017

In 2008, at the age of 15, Thirlwall auditioned for The X Factor (UK), singing "Where Do Broken Hearts Go" by Whitney Houston, but was eliminated at the boot- camp stage. She returned for a second time in 2010, but was unsuccessful. In 2011, at age 18, Thirlwall returned for the show's eighth series and auditioned with "I Want to Hold Your Hand" by the Beatles, and advanced to bootcamp stage. After failing the first challenge she was placed into a group named Orion with Leigh-Anne Pinnock. Perrie Edwards and Jesy Nelson were both in another group called Faux Pas, and eliminated from the contest. Later, she and the other girls were called back by the judges and were placed into a supergroup originally known as Rhythmix. Without a performance, they automatically progressed to the judges' houses and reached the live shows, where they were mentored by Tulisa Contostavlos.

On 28 October 2011, it was announced the group had to change their name to Little Mix, because of legal issues. On 11 December 2011, Little Mix was announced as the first group to win the series and subsequently became the first girl group to make it past week seven of the live shows, the first to reach The X Factor final and the only girl band to win the show before it was discontinued.

Thirlwall shares songwriting credits for more than 50 songs, across Little Mix's six studio albums. She has co-written two UK number one singles with "Wings" in 2012 and "Shout Out to My Ex" in 2016. In 2019, she was recognised as an official songwriter after signing with Sony/ATV. Since Little Mix's debut they have been cited for helping the girl band renaissance in the UK and for re-defining girl groups. In December 2021, the group announced they would be going on a hiatus, after The Confetti Tour in 2022 to allow its members to pursue solo projects.

=== 2022–present: Solo endeavours and That's Showbiz Baby! ===
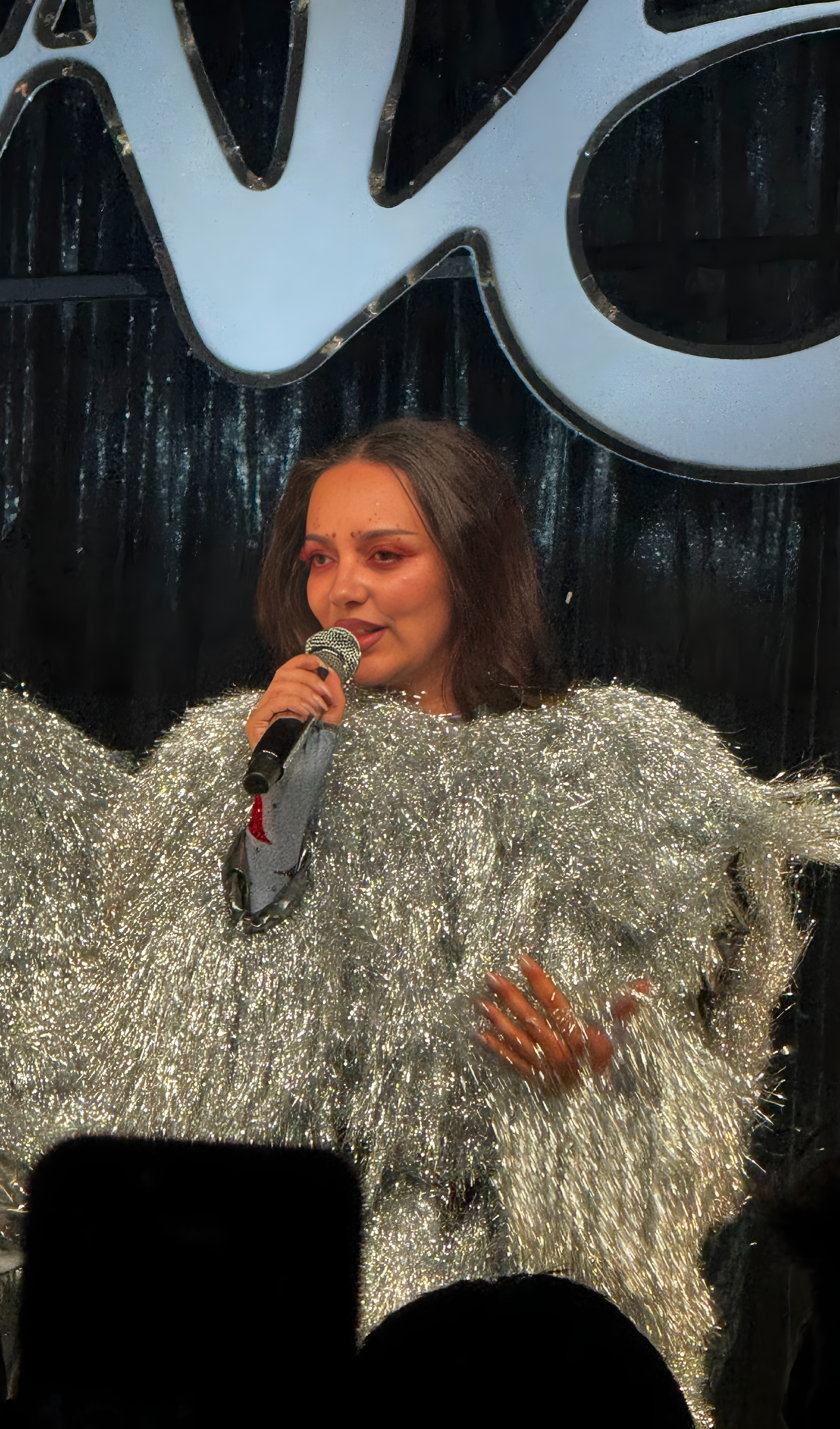
Jade performing during the That's Showbiz Baby: the Tour in Brussels in 2026.

In March 2022, Thirlwall appeared as a guest judge on the first series of RuPaul's Drag Race: UK vs. the World, and made a cameo appearance in the British musical television drama series Mood. The same month, she signed a solo recording contract with RCA Records in the UK and USA, and with Full Stop Management. She co-wrote a track for Nayeon's 2022 debut album, Im Nayeon, marking the second time she had worked with her having previously contributed to Twice's album Taste of Love in 2021. She dropped her surname for her solo activities, choosing to perform mononymously under the name Jade.

Thirlwall's debut solo single titled "Angel of My Dreams" was released on 19 July 2024. The song peaked at number seven on the UK Singles Chart. It was featured during the Victoria's Secret Fashion show in October 2026. In September 2024, she released the promotional single titled "Midnight Cowboy", followed by her second official single, "Fantasy", on 18 October 2024. She performed "Angel of My Dreams" for the first time, along with "Fantasy", on Later... with Jools Holland on 19 October 2024. At the UK Music Video Awards 2024, she received five nominations for "Angel of My Dreams", winning Best Editing. On 25 October, she performed "Fantasy" and a cover of Chase & Status and Stormzy's "Backbone" on BBC Radio 1's Live Lounge. In November 2024, she won the Trailblazer Award at the Rolling Stone UK Awards. Thirlwall performed "Fantasy" and a medley of Donna Summer's "Hot Stuff" and Eddie Floyd's "Knock on Wood" on Jools' Annual Hootenanny on 31 December 2024.

On 10 January 2025, she released the promotional single, "It Girl". At the 2025 Brit Awards, she won Best Pop Act and was nominated for Song of the Year for "Angel of My Dreams", which she performed during the ceremony. On 7 March 2025, she released an Apple Music exclusive cover of Madonna's song "Frozen", followed by her third single, "FUFN (Fuck You For Now)", on 14 March. Thirlwall was also featured on the remix version of Le Sserafim 2025 single "Hot" released on 14 April. Her fourth single, "Plastic Box", was released on 20 June 2025. At the 2025 British LGBT Awards, Thirlwall won the Celebrity Ally Award. On 28 June, she performed at Glastonbury Festival, and premiered the song "Gossip", a collaboration with Confidence Man released on 23 July. On 8 July, she was included on the deluxe reissue of Kesha's album Period (2025), as a feature on a remix of the song "Boy Crazy". On 25 July, Jade headlined the first-ever televised BBC Proms concert outside of London, at The Glasshouse in Gateshead, performing with the Royal Northern Sinfonia and conducted by Robert Ames. Thirlwall's debut album, That's Showbiz Baby!, was released on 12 September 2025. The following month, she made guest appearances on two songs: "Tonight" with PinkPantheress and "Angel of Satisfaction" with Rose Gray. On 28 November 2025, Thirlwall announced a deluxe edition her debut album, That's Showbiz Baby! The Encore, featuring seven new songs and her previously released cover of Madonna's "Frozen". The deluxe edition was released on 5 December 2025. On 19 December 2025, she was granted the freedom of borough honour in South Shields.

== Artistry ==
Thirlwall's sound has been described as a combination of pop, R&B and disco She describes her sound as "Frankenstein pop" with influences from other genres including europop, techno, tropical house, Latin pop, and electronic music. She grew up listening to Motown music, with her grandfather playing Arabic music to her as a child. She cites Diana Ross as a music influence and has also expressed her love for drag culture, drag queens and is fan of RuPaul. In 2020, for an interview for Attitude magazine she added:

"Doing a lot of performing arts growing up and stuff, I've always been surrounded by a lot of LGBTQ+ friends that have been in theatre school with me or at school. When we used to go on holiday Benidorm, one of the favourite things was when me mam used to the drag shows. Me mam's always been into the glitz and the glamour [of drag] and her idol and my idols are Diana Ross, and all the big divas. And I think for me growing up, whenever I saw drag shows as a little girl, I associated drag queens with the big divas. It's something that we've always loved".

== Personal life ==
From 2020 to 2026, Thirlwall was in a relationship with English singer Jordan Stephens, from the hip-hop duo Rizzle Kicks. The pair started dating in 2020 after being spotted together for the first time at a Black Trans Lives Matter rally in central London in July of that year. After speculation and leaks to tabloid media, Stephens confirmed the pair had split on the Miss Me? podcast in July 2026.

Thirlwall has tattoos. On her spine, she has an Arabic tattoo that reads "Anyone can achieve their dreams if they've got the courage" as a tribute to her Egyptian and Yemeni ancestry, as well as a tattoo on her ribcage that means "queen" in Arabic. She also has tattoos on her feet, and in 2019 revealed a henna-style design on her right foot. She got a tattoo on her leg in 2021 to commemorate the day Little Mix was formed, in celebration of the group's tenth anniversary.

Thirlwall is open about her struggles with body image, racism, bullying, and eating disorder, which she first developed at the age of 13. As a child and teenager, she experienced prejudice and racism for her mixed ethnicity, recalling in an interview for Vogue Arabia:

"At school, I didn't fit into any group, and started to experience prejudice and racism. I was one of the very few people of colour in the school, so from the off I felt like an outcast. I used to get called the P-word, which I didn't understand as I'm not Pakistani. I was also called half-caste. During one incident someone pinned me down in the toilets and put a bindi spot on my forehead. There was a complete lack of education and understanding of different races and faiths. It affected my mental health. I became very depressed and it triggered the eating disorder I had throughout school."

Thirlwall began recovery and left the hospital weeks before she auditioned for The X Factor in 2011. In 2020, she was featured in a documentary titled Leigh-Anne: Race, Pop & Power, and spoke about the time that she wanted cosmetic surgery after discovering her images were heavily edited to make her look as "white as possible" during her earlier days in Little Mix.

In 2022, Thirlwall appeared on Heat's "UK and Ireland 30 under 30" rich list for the first time with an estimated net worth of £17.5 million, placing her at number 15. The following year, she climbed to 11th position with £19.8 million.

== Endorsements and fashion ==
Thirlwall is a patron for Cancer Connections and an ambassador for Stonewall. In November 2019, Thirlwall opened her own cocktail bar, called Arbeia, in South Shields. In June 2020, she collaborated with Skinnydip London, a British clothing brand, with the money from her collection being donated to help struggling families in South Shields. In the same year she launched a second collaboration with them. In August 2020, she was announced as the Honorary President for South Shields F.C. and became a shareholder for the club in the same year.

In September 2020, she was photographed alongside Heidi Klum, Lil Nas X and Helen Christensen by fashion campaign Christian Cowan for his Spring/Summer 2021 collection. On 10 September 2021, Thirlwall was announced as the new face ambassador of the Italian sportswear brand, Ellesse "Autumn/Winter" collection. On 11 October 2021, she released her own eyeshadow palette in collaboration with Beauty Bay. On 12 February 2025, Italian fashion house Fendi launched an advertising campaign featuring Thirlwall.

== Activism ==
She is noted for her political reviews and social activism, advocating for LGBTQ+ rights and Black Lives Matter and against transgender conversion therapy in the UK. In May 2014, she donated a haul of clothes, with all proceeds going to homelessness support. In 2017, Thirlwall donated another collection of her clothes to help raise money for Cancer Connections. In the same year, she helped raised money for Stonewall at her drag-themed 25th birthday party. In May 2018, she also spoke at the Stonewall Youth Awards about what it meant to be an ally and encouraged more artists to do the same. In 2018, she became an LGBTQ+ rights ambassador for LGBTQ+ charity Stonewall, and in 2018, attended Manchester Pride with them.

In 2019, Thirlwall and Michelle Visage raised £10,000 for the Mermaids UK, and in the same year she climbed Mount Kilimanjaro to raise funds for Comic Relief's Red Nose Day with Leigh-Anne Pinnock, and other British celebrities. In December 2019, she spent her birthday raising money for cancer charities which has become a yearly tradition for her. In 2020, she attended a march with Stonewall during Manchester Pride and took to social media to call out someone who questioned the importance of pride month.

In June 2020, Thirlwall attended a Black Lives Matter protest in the UK following the death of African-American man George Floyd, and attended the Black Trans Lives Matter march in London.

In January 2021, Thirlwall won one of The Great Stand Up to Cancer Bake Off specials in the fourth series. In March 2021 she partnered up with UNICEF to learn about the war in Yemen. In July 2021, she signed an open letter to the UK Equalities minister Liz Truss calling for a ban on all forms of LGBT+ conversion therapy. In May 2022, Thirlwall contributed to Sink the Pink's book titled Sink the Pink's Manifesto for Misfits, writing about her experiences with bullying, anorexia and her identity issues because of her mixed race. She also teamed up with a designer to create a limited edition community shirt for a North East football club, with all donations going to charity Cancer Connections. Thirlwall attended the Not Safe To Be Me protest at Downing Street advocating for the ban on transgender conversion therapy in the UK, following the government's reversal on the issue.

In June 2025, Thirwall criticised J. K. Rowling during her performance at Mighty Hoopla for her comments towards the transgender community.

== Discography ==
=== Studio albums ===
List of albums, with selected details, chart positions, sales figures, and certifications
| Title | Details | Peak chart positions | | | | | | | | | | Sales | Certifications |
| Title | Details | UK | AUS | AUT | BEL (FL) | FRA | GER | IRE | NLD | POR | SCO | Sales | Certifications |
|---|---|---|---|---|---|---|---|---|---|---|---|---|---|
| That's Showbiz Baby! | Released: 12 September 2025; Label: RCA; Formats: Cassette, CD, digital download, LP, streaming | 3 | 11 | 18 | 7 | 54 | 28 | 9 | 14 | 35 | 2 | UK: 77,638 | BPI: Silver |

=== Singles ===
List of singles, with selected chart positions and certifications, showing year released and originating album.
| Title | Year | Peak chart positions | | | | | | | | | | Certifications | Album |
| Title | Year | UK | CAN | IRE | NLD Tip | NOR | NZ Hot | POR | SWE | US | WW | Certifications | Album |
|---|---|---|---|---|---|---|---|---|---|---|---|---|---|
| "Angel of My Dreams" | 2024 | 7 | 44 | 18 | 25 | 43 | 4 | 77 | 63 | 70 | 55 | BPI: Platinum | That's Showbiz Baby! |
| "Fantasy" | 2024 | 52 | — | — | — | — | — | — | — | — | — | | That's Showbiz Baby! |
| "FUFN (Fuck You for Now)" | 2025 | 25 | — | 84 | — | — | 28 | — | — | — | — | | That's Showbiz Baby! |
| "Plastic Box" | 2025 | 44 | — | — | — | — | — | — | — | — | — | | That's Showbiz Baby! |
| "Gossip" (with Confidence Man) | 2025 | — (Note: "Gossip" did not enter the UK Singles Chart, but peaked at number 35 on the UK Singles Sales Chart.) | — | — | — | — | — | — | — | — | — | | Non-album single |
| "Unconditional" | 2025 | 51 | — | — | — | — | 36 | — | — | — | — | | That's Showbiz Baby! |
| "Church" | 2025 | — (Note: "Church" did not enter the UK Singles Chart, but peaked at number 31 on the UK Singles Sales Chart.) | — | — | — | — | 34 | — | — | — | — | | That's Showbiz Baby! The Encore |
"—" denotes a recording that did not chart or was not released in that territory.

=== Promotional singles ===
| Title | Year | Peak chart positions | | Album |
| Title | Year | UK | NZ Hot | Album |
|---|---|---|---|---|
| "Midnight Cowboy" | 2024 | 93 | — | That's Showbiz Baby! |
| "It Girl" | 2025 | 44 | 13 | That's Showbiz Baby! |
| "Frozen" | 2025 | — (Note: "Frozen" did not enter the UK Singles Chart, but peaked at number 5 on the UK Singles Sales Chart.) | — | That's Showbiz Baby! The Encore |
| "Natural at Disaster" (Note: Orchestral version of "Natural at Disaster" was included on Amazon Music edition of That's Showbiz Baby! The Encore.) (orchestral version) | 2025 | — | — | That's Showbiz Baby! The Encore |
| "Into the Deep (Seas Cry)" (featuring Hans Zimmer) | 2026 | — | — | Blue Planet III |
"—" denotes a recording that did not chart or was not released in that territory.

=== Other charted songs ===
| Title | Year | Peak chart positions | | Album |
| Title | Year | UK DL. | POR Air. | Album |
|---|---|---|---|---|
| "Before You Break My Heart" | 2025 | — | 27 | That's Showbiz Baby! |
| "Use Me" | 2025 | 86 | — | That's Showbiz Baby! The Encore |
"—" denotes a recording that did not chart or was not released in that territory.

=== Guest appearances ===
| Title | Year | Artist | Album |
|---|---|---|---|
| "Hot" (English version remix) | 2025 | Le Sserafim | Non-album song |
| "Boy Crazy" | 2025 | Kesha | . (...) |
| "Tonight" | 2025 | PinkPantheress | Fancy Some More? |
| "Angel of Satisfaction" | 2025 | Rose Gray | A Little Louder, Please |
| "Beg for Me" (Jade remix) | 2026 | Lily Allen | Non-album song |

=== Songwriting credits ===
List of songwriting credits, with year released, artist and originating album.
| Song | Year | Artist | Album | Notes |
|---|---|---|---|---|
| "Wings" | 2012 | Little Mix | DNA | Co-writer |
| "DNA" | 2012 | Little Mix | DNA | Co-writer |
| "Change Your Life" | 2012 | Little Mix | DNA | Co-writer |
| "How Ya Doin'?" | 2012 | Little Mix | DNA | Co-writer |
| "Pretend It’s Okay" | 2012 | Little Mix | DNA | Co-writer |
| "Going Nowhere" | 2012 | Little Mix | DNA | Co-writer |
| "Madhouse" | 2012 | Little Mix | DNA | Co-writer |
| "Move" | 2013 | Little Mix | Salute | Co-writer |
| "Little Me" | 2013 | Little Mix | Salute | Co-writer |
| "Salute" | 2013 | Little Mix | Salute | Co-writer |
| "Pretty Girls" | 2015 | Britney Spears and Iggy Azalea | Non-album single | Co-writer |
| "Shout Out to My Ex" | 2016 | Little Mix | Glory Days | Co-writer |
| "Joan of Arc" | 2018 | Little Mix | LM5 | Co-writer |
| "Wasabi" | 2018 | Little Mix | LM5 | Co-writer |
| "Break Up Song" | 2020 | Little Mix | Confetti | Co-writer |
| "Holiday" | 2020 | Little Mix | Confetti | Co-writer |
| "No Time for Tears" | 2020 | Nathan Dawe and Little Mix | Confetti | Co-writer |
| "Heartbreak Anthem" | 2021 | Galantis, David Guetta and Little Mix | Between Us | Co-writer |
| "First Time" | 2021 | Twice | Taste of Love | Co-writer |
| "No" | 2021 | Little Mix | Between Us | Co-writer |
| "Love (Sweet Love)" | 2021 | Little Mix | Between Us | Co-writer |
| "Children" | 2021 | Billy Porter | Black Mona Lisa | Co-writer |
| "Candyfloss" | 2022 | Nayeon | Im Nayeon | Co-writer |
| "Angel of My Dreams" | 2024 | Herself | That's Showbiz Baby! | Co-writer |
| "Midnight Cowboy" | 2024 | Herself | That's Showbiz Baby! | Co-writer |
| "Fantasy" | 2024 | Herself | That's Showbiz Baby! | Co-writer |
| "It Girl" | 2025 | Herself | That's Showbiz Baby! | Co-writer |
| "FUFN (Fuck You for Now)" | 2025 | Herself | That's Showbiz Baby! | Co-writer |
| "Plastic Box" | 2025 | Herself | That's Showbiz Baby! | Co-writer |
| "Unconditional" | 2025 | Herself | That's Showbiz Baby! | Co-writer |
| "Self Saboteur" | 2025 | Herself | That's Showbiz Baby! | Co-writer |
| "Lip Service" | 2025 | Herself | That's Showbiz Baby! | Co-writer |
| "Headache" | 2025 | Herself | That's Showbiz Baby! | Co-writer |
| "Natural at Disaster" | 2025 | Herself | That's Showbiz Baby! | Co-writer |
| "Glitch" | 2025 | Herself | That's Showbiz Baby! | Co-writer |
| "Before You Break My Heart" | 2025 | Herself | That's Showbiz Baby! | Co-writer |
| "Silent Disco" | 2025 | Herself | That's Showbiz Baby! | Co-writer |
| "Boy Crazy" | 2025 | Kesha and herself | . (...) | Co-writer |
| "Gossip" | 2025 | Confidence Man and herself | Non-album single | Co-writer |
| "Tonight" | 2025 | PinkPantheress and herself | Fancy Some More? | Co-writer |
| "Church" | 2025 | Herself | That's Showbiz Baby! The Encore | Co-writer |
| "This Is What We Dance For" | 2025 | Herself | That's Showbiz Baby! The Encore | Co-writer |
| "Dreamcheater" | 2025 | Herself | That's Showbiz Baby! The Encore | Co-writer |
| "Best You Could" | 2025 | Herself | That's Showbiz Baby! The Encore | Co-writer |
| "Use Me" | 2025 | Herself | That's Showbiz Baby! The Encore | Co-writer |
| "If My Heart Was a House" | 2025 | Herself | That's Showbiz Baby! The Encore | Co-writer |
| "Tar" | 2025 | Herself | That's Showbiz Baby! The Encore | Co-writer |
| "Beg for Me" (Jade remix) | 2026 | Lily Allen and herself | Non-album promotional singles | Co-writer |
| "Into the Deep (Seas Cry)" | 2026 | Herself featuring Hans Zimmer | Blue Planet III | Co-writer |

== Filmography ==
=== Music videos ===
| Title | Year | Director | Album | Ref. |
|---|---|---|---|---|
| "Angel of My Dreams" | 2024 | Aube Perrie | That's Showbiz Baby! | |
| "Angel of My Dreams" (S.A.D. version - Slow. Angelic. Dramatic. - Live) | 2024 | Theo Adams and Sophie Muller | Non-album single | |
| "Midnight Cowboy" (Note: Labelled as a "visualiser" on YouTube) | 2024 | Fa & Fon | That's Showbiz Baby! | |
| "Fantasy" | 2024 | David LaChapelle | That's Showbiz Baby! | |
| "It Girl" | 2025 | Fa & Fon | That's Showbiz Baby! | |
| "FUFN (Fuck You for Now)" | 2025 | Lucrecia | That's Showbiz Baby! | |
| "FUFN (Fuck You for Now)" (acoustic version) | 2025 | Sarah Dattani Tucker | Non-album single | |
| "Plastic Box" | 2025 | India Harris | That's Showbiz Baby! | |
| "Gossip" (with Confidence Man) | 2025 | India Harris | Non-album single | |
| "Unconditional" | 2025 | Fa & Fon | That's Showbiz Baby! | |
| "Silent Disco" | 2025 | Fa & Fon | That's Showbiz Baby! | |
| "Glitch" | 2025 | Fa & Fon | That's Showbiz Baby! | |
| "Lip Service" | 2025 | Fa & Fon | That's Showbiz Baby! | |
| "Self Saboteur" | 2025 | Fa & Fon | That's Showbiz Baby! | |
| "Natural at Disaster" | 2025 | —N/a | That's Showbiz Baby! | |
| "Before You Break My Heart" | 2025 | Niyadre | That's Showbiz Baby! | |
| "Headache" | 2025 | Fa & Fon | That's Showbiz Baby! | |
| "Natural at Disaster" (orchestral version) | 2025 | Jim Wilmot | Non-album single | |
| "Church" | 2025 | Billy King | That's Showbiz Baby! The Encore | |
| "Church" (M.A.S.S. version – Majestic. Angelic. Spiritual. Sacred.) | 2025 | Niyadre | Non-album single | |

=== Music video guest appearances ===
| Title | Year | Performer | Director | Ref. |
|---|---|---|---|---|
| "Mirror Mirror" | 2021 | Kamille | RebekahBCreative | |
| "Big Bad Mood" | 2022 | Jordan Stephens featuring Miraa May | Charlie Coombes | |
| "Starburster" | 2024 | Fontaines D.C. | Aube Perrie | |

=== Television ===
| Title | Year | Role | Notes | Ref. |
|---|---|---|---|---|
| Skin | 2007 | Sofie | Short film | |
| Mood | 2022 | Herself | Episode 4: "Get That Schmoneyyy" | |

== Accolades ==
In 2024, Thirlwall's song "Angel of My Dreams" made her the only Little Mix member to have a solo single spend two weeks inside of the top ten of the UK singles chart to date. In 2025, she became the first former girl band member to win a solo Brit Award.

| Award | Year | Category | Nominated work | Result | Ref. |
|---|---|---|---|---|---|
| BBC Radio 1 Teen Awards | 2017 | Most Entertaining Celebrity | Herself | Nominated | |
| Berlin Music Video Awards | 2025 | Best Art Director | "Angel of My Dreams" | Nominated | |
| Brit Awards | 2025 | Song of the Year | "Angel of My Dreams" | Nominated | |
| Brit Awards | 2025 | Best Pop Act | Herself | Won | |
| Brit Awards | 2026 | Best Pop Act | Herself | Nominated | |
| Brit Awards | 2026 | British Artist of the Year | Herself | Nominated | |
| BreakTudo Awards | 2024 | Anthem of the Year | "Angel of My Dreams" | Nominated | |
| British LGBT Awards | 2022 | Celebrity Ally | Herself | Nominated | |
| British LGBT Awards | 2024 | Celebrity Ally | Herself | Nominated | |
| British LGBT Awards | 2025 | Celebrity Ally | Herself | Won | |
| British LGBT Awards | 2026 | Advocate Award | Herself | Nominated | |
| Broadcast Digital Awards | 2021 | Best Short-Form Format | Served! with Jade Thirlwall | Nominated | |
| Ethnicity Awards | 2020 | Equality Award | Herself | Won | |
| Ethnicity Awards | 2020 | Inspirational Personality | Herself | Nominated | |
| Ivor Novello Awards | 2025 | Best Contemporary Song | "Angel of My Dreams" | Nominated | |
| iHeartRadio Music Awards | 2026 | Favorite Debut Album | That's Showbiz Baby! | Nominated | |
| Gay Times Honours | 2021 | Allyship | Herself | Won | |
| Mercury Prize | 2026 | Album of the Year | That's Showbiz Baby! | Pending | |
| Music Week Awards | 2025 | PR Campaign | Herself | Nominated | |
| Music Week Awards | 2026 | Artist Marketing Campaign | Herself | Won | |
| PLT Awards | 2020 | LGBTQ Influencer of the Year | Herself | Nominated | |
| Popjustice £20 Music Prize | 2024 | Best British Pop Single | "Angel of My Dreams" | Nominated | |
| Popjustice £20 Music Prize | 2025 | Best British Pop Single | "Angel of My Dreams" | Nominated | |
| Popjustice £20 Music Prize | 2025 | Best British Pop Single | "Fantasy" | Nominated | |
| Popjustice £20 Music Prize | 2025 | Best British Pop Single | "FUFN (Fuck You for Now)" | Nominated | |
| Popjustice £20 Music Prize | 2025 | Best British Pop Single | "It Girl" | Nominated | |
| Popjustice £20 Music Prize | 2025 | Best British Pop Single | "Plastic Box" | Won | |
| Rolling Stone UK Awards | 2024 | The Song of the Year Award | "Angel of My Dreams" | Nominated | |
| Rolling Stone UK Awards | 2024 | Trailblazer Award | Herself | Won | |
| UK Music Video Awards | 2024 | Best Pop Video – UK | "Angel of My Dreams" | Nominated | |
| UK Music Video Awards | 2024 | Best Live Video | "Angel of My Dreams" | Nominated | |
| UK Music Video Awards | 2024 | Best Performance in a Video | "Angel of My Dreams" | Nominated | |
| UK Music Video Awards | 2024 | Best Styling | "Angel of My Dreams" | Nominated | |
| UK Music Video Awards | 2024 | Best Editing in a Video | "Angel of My Dreams" | Won | |
| UK Music Video Awards | 2025 | Best Dance / Electronic Video – Newcomer | "Gossip" (with Confidence Man) | Nominated | |
| UK Music Video Awards | 2026 | Best Styling in a Video | "Church" | Pending | |
| Harper's Bazaar Women of the Year Awards | 2025 | Musician of the Year | Herself | Won | |
| Silver Clef Award | 2026 | Best Female | Herself | Won | |

=== Listicles ===
Name of publisher, year listed, name of listicle, and placement
| Publisher | Year | Listicle | Placement | Ref. |
|---|---|---|---|---|
| The Guardian | 2019 | Best Girl Group Members | 11th | |
| Heat | 2022 | UK and Ireland 30 Under 30 Rich List | 15th | |
| Heat | 2023 | UK and Ireland 30 Under 30 Rich List | 11th | |

== Tours ==
=== Headlining ===
- That's Showbiz Baby: the Tour (2025-2026)

=== Supporting ===
- Chappell Roan – Visions of Damsels & Other Dangerous Things Tour (2025; Scotland only)
