= List of awards and nominations received by Jordan Peele =

Jordan Peele awards and nominations
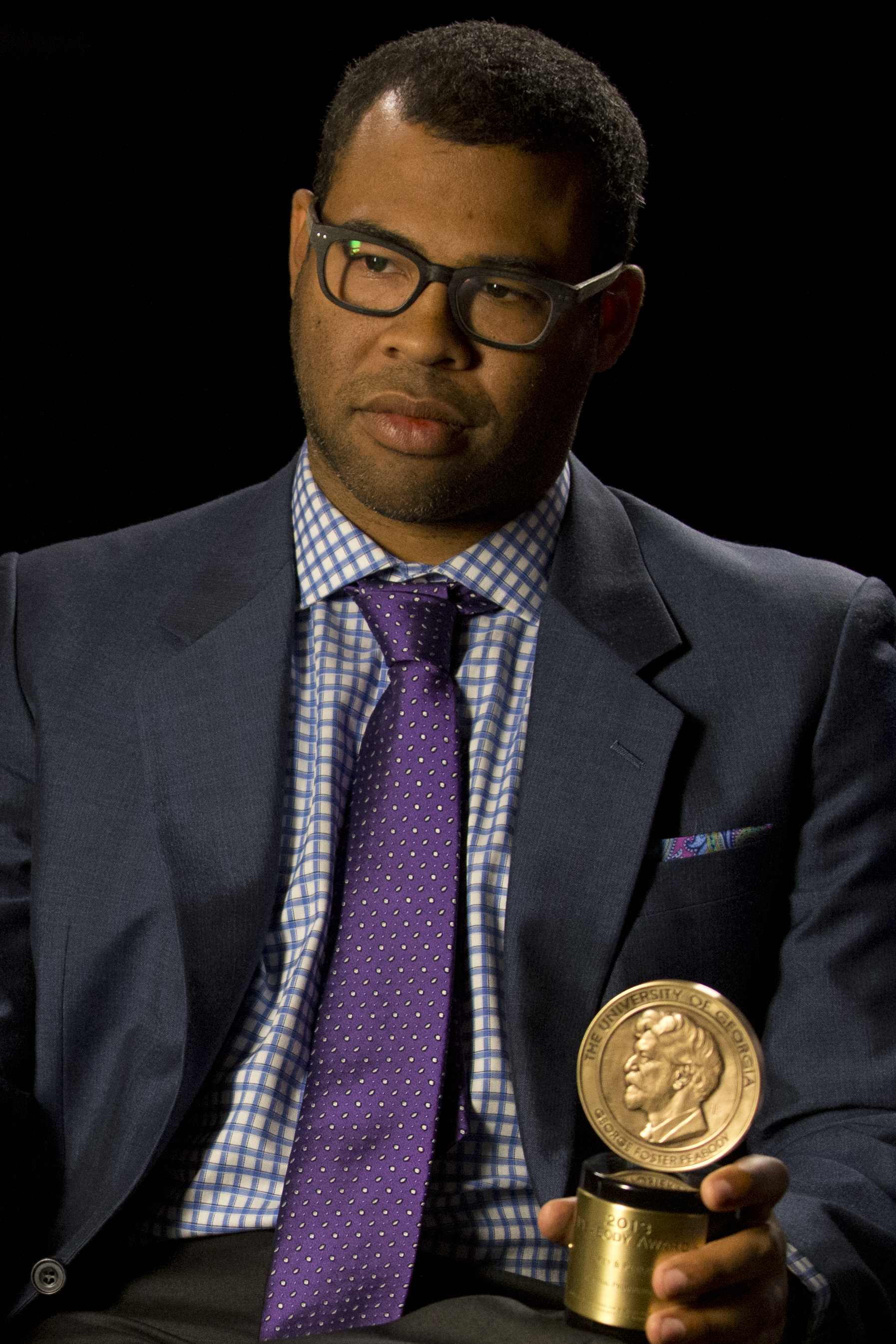
- Peele at the 2014 Peabody Awards
Awards and nominations
Award	Wins	Nominations

American actor, writer, and director Jordan Peele has received a variety of awards and nominations for his work.

Jordan Peele has been nominated for eight Primetime Emmy Award nominations, including seven for the Comedy Central sketch series Key and Peele which ran from 2012 to 2015. He and Keegan-Michael Key won the Primetime Emmy Award for Outstanding Variety Sketch Series in 2016. Peele also received critical acclaim for his directorial film debut, a satirical horror film, Get Out (2017) for which he received three Academy Award nominations for Best Picture, Best Director, and Best Original Screenplay, the latter of which he won. He also received British Academy Film Award, Golden Globe Award, and Screen Actors Guild Award nominations.

== Major associations ==
=== Academy Awards ===
Year	Category	Nominated work	Result	Ref.
2018	Best Picture	Get Out	Nominated	
2018	Best Director	Get Out	Nominated	
2018	Best Original Screenplay	Get Out	Won	
2019	Best Picture	BlacKkKlansman	Nominated	

=== British Academy Film Awards ===
Year	Category	Nominated work	Result	Ref.
2018	Best Original Screenplay	Get Out	Nominated	
2019	Best Film	BlacKkKlansman	Nominated	

=== Britannia Awards ===
Year	Category	Nominated work	Result	Ref.
2019	John Schlesinger Britannia Award for Excellence in Directing		Won	

=== Primetime Emmy Awards ===
Year	Category	Nominated work	Result	Ref.
2008	Original Music and Lyrics	MADtv ("Sad Fitty Cent")	Nominated	
2014	Outstanding Writing for a Variety Series	Key & Peele	Nominated	
2015	Outstanding Variety Sketch Series	Key & Peele	Nominated	
2015	Outstanding Writing for a Variety Series	Key & Peele	Nominated	
2015	Outstanding Writing for a Variety Special	Key and Peele Super Bowl Special	Nominated	
2015	Outstanding Short-Format Live-Action Entertainment Program	Key and Peele Presents: The Ascension	Nominated	
2016	Outstanding Variety Sketch Series	Key & Peele	Won	
2016	Outstanding Writing for a Variety Series	Key & Peele	Nominated	

=== Golden Globe Awards ===
Year	Category	Nominated work	Result	Ref.
2018	Best Motion Picture – Musical or Comedy	Get Out	Nominated	
2019	Best Motion Picture – Drama	BlacKkKlansman	Nominated	

== Guild Awards ==
=== Writers Guild Award ===
Year	Category"	Work	Result	Ref.
2013	Best Comedy/Variety (Including Talk) – Series	Key & Peele	Nominated	
2016	Best Comedy/Variety – Sketch Series	Key & Peele	Nominated	
2018	Best Original Screenplay	Get Out	Won	
2023	Best Original Screenplay	Nope	Nominated	

=== Directors Guild Award ===
Year	Category	Work	Result	Ref.
2018	Outstanding Directing – Feature Film	Get Out	Nominated	
2018	Outstanding Directing – First-Time Feature Film	Get Out	Won	

=== Producers Guild Award ===
Year	Category	Work	Result	Ref.
2018	Best Theatrical Motion Picture	Get Out	Nominated	
2019	Best Theatrical Motion Picture	BlacKkKlansman	Nominated	

=== Screen Actors Guild Awards ===
Year	Category	Work	Result	Ref.
2016	Outstanding Performance by an Ensemble in a Comedy Series	Key & Peele	Nominated	

== Other awards ==
Year	Award	Category	Work	Result
2013	Peabody Award		Key & Peele	Won
2014	NAACP Image Award	Outstanding Variety–Series or Special	Key & Peele	Nominated
2014	American Comedy Award	Best Alternative Comedy Series	Key & Peele	Won
2014	American Comedy Award	Comedy Actor – TV	Key & Peele	Nominated
2014	American Comedy Award	Best Comedy Writing – TV	Key & Peele	Nominated
2015	People's Choice Award	Favorite Sketch Comedy TV Show	Key & Peele	Nominated
2015	NAACP Image Award	Outstanding Comedy Series	Key & Peele	Nominated
2016	NAACP Image Awards	Outstanding Comedy Series	Key & Peele	Nominated
2016	NAACP Image Awards	Outstanding Writing in a Comedy Series	Key & Peele	Nominated
2017	MTV Movie & TV Awards	Movie of the Year	Get Out	Nominated
2017	MTV Movie & TV Awards	Best Fight Against the System	Get Out	Nominated
2017	Capri Hollywood International Film Festival	Best Picture	Get Out	Won
2017	Imagine Film Festival	Silver Scream Award	Get Out	Won
2017	BET Awards	Best Movie	Get Out	Nominated
2017	Gotham Independent Film Awards	Best Feature	Get Out	Won
2017	Gotham Independent Film Awards	Bingham Ray Breakthrough Director Award	Get Out	Nominated
2017	Gotham Independent Film Awards	Best Screenplay	Get Out	Won
2017	Gotham Independent Film Awards	Audience Awards	Get Out	Won
2017	Detroit Film Critics Society	Best Film	Get Out	Nominated
2017	Detroit Film Critics Society	Best Director	Get Out	Nominated
2017	Detroit Film Critics Society	Best Screenplay	Get Out	Nominated
2017	Detroit Film Critics Society	Best Breakthrough	Get Out	Won
2017	Washington D.C. Area Film Critics Association	Best Film	Get Out	Won
2017	Washington D.C. Area Film Critics Association	Best Director	Get Out	Nominated
2017	Washington D.C. Area Film Critics Association	Best Original Screenplay	Get Out	Won
2017	Boston Society of Film Critics	Best New Filmmaker	Get Out	Won
2017	British Independent Film Awards	Best International Independent Film	Get Out	Won
2017	New York Film Critics Online	Top Ten Films	Get Out	Won
2017	New York Film Critics Online	Best Debut as Director	Get Out	Won
2017	New York Film Critics Online	Best Screenplay	Get Out	Won
2017	San Francisco Film Critics Circle	Best Film	Get Out	Nominated
2017	San Francisco Film Critics Circle	Best Director	Get Out	Nominated
2017	San Francisco Film Critics Circle	Best Original Screenplay	Get Out	Won
2017	Toronto Film Critics Association	Best First Feature	Get Out	Won
2017	Toronto Film Critics Association	Best Screenplay	Get Out	Won
2017	San Diego Film Critics Society	Best Film	Get Out	Won
2017	San Diego Film Critics Society	Best Director	Get Out	Nominated
2017	San Diego Film Critics Society	Best Original Screenplay	Get Out	Won
2017	African-American Film Critics Association	Best Picture	Get Out	Won
2017	African-American Film Critics Association	Top Ten Films	Get Out	Won
2017	African-American Film Critics Association	Best Director	Get Out	Won
2017	African-American Film Critics Association	Best Screenplay	Get Out	Won
2017	Chicago Film Critics Association	Best Director	Get Out	Nominated
2017	Chicago Film Critics Association	Best Original Screenplay	Get Out	Won
2017	Chicago Film Critics Association	Most Promising Filmmaker	Get Out	Nominated
2017	Dallas–Fort Worth Film Critics Association	Best Film	Get Out	5th Place
2017	Dallas–Fort Worth Film Critics Association	Best Director	Get Out	5th Place
2017	Dublin Film Critics' Circle	Best Film	Get Out	2nd Place
2017	Dublin Film Critics' Circle	Best Director	Get Out	3rd Place
2017	Dublin Film Critics' Circle	Best Screenplay	Get Out	Won
2017	Dublin Film Critics' Circle	Breakthrough Artist of the Year	Get Out	Nominated
2017	St. Louis Film Critics Association	Best Film	Get Out	Nominated
2017	St. Louis Film Critics Association	Best Director	Get Out	Nominated
2017	St. Louis Film Critics Association	Best Original Screenplay	Get Out	Nominated
2017	Seattle Film Critics Society	Best Picture of the Year	Get Out	Won
2017	Seattle Film Critics Society	Best Director	Get Out	Nominated
2017	Seattle Film Critics Society	Best Screenplay	Get Out	Nominated
2017	Florida Film Critics Circle	Best Film	Get Out	Nominated
2017	Florida Film Critics Circle	Best Director	Get Out	Nominated
2017	Florida Film Critics Circle	Best Original Screenplay	Get Out	Won
2017	Florida Film Critics Circle	Best First Film	Get Out	Won
2017	Online Film Critics Society	Best Picture	Get Out	Won
2017	Online Film Critics Society	Best Director	Get Out	Runner-up (Note: Tied with Guillermo del Toro for The Shape of Water.)
2017	Online Film Critics Society	Best Original Screenplay	Get Out	Won
2018	AACTA International Awards	Best Screenplay	Get Out	Nominated
2018	National Board of Review	Best Directorial Debut	Get Out	Won
2018	Critics' Choice Awards	Best Sci-Fi/Horror Movie	Get Out	Won
2018	Critics' Choice Awards	Best Director	Get Out	Nominated
2018	Critics' Choice Awards	Best Original Screenplay	Get Out	Won
2018	Los Angeles Film Critics Association Awards	Best Screenplay	Get Out	Won
2018	London Film Critics' Circle Awards	Screenwriter of the Year	Get Out	Nominated
2018	Satellite Awards	Best Director	Get Out	Won
2018	Satellite Awards	Best Original Screenplay	Get Out	Nominated
2018	Independent Spirit Awards	Best Feature	Get Out	Won
2018	Independent Spirit Awards	Best Director	Get Out	Won
2018	Independent Spirit Awards	Best Screenplay	Get Out	Nominated
2018	Saturn Awards	Best Director	Get Out	Nominated
2018	Saturn Awards	Best Writing	Get Out	Nominated
2019	Saturn Awards	Best Director	Us	Won
2019	Saturn Awards	Best Writing	Us	Nominated
2022	Saturn Awards	Best Director	Nope	Nominated
2022	Saturn Awards	Best Writing	Nope	Nominated

In 2020, he was named the Rondo Hatton Classic Horror Awards' Monster Kid of the Year.
