= Jordan Peele filmography =

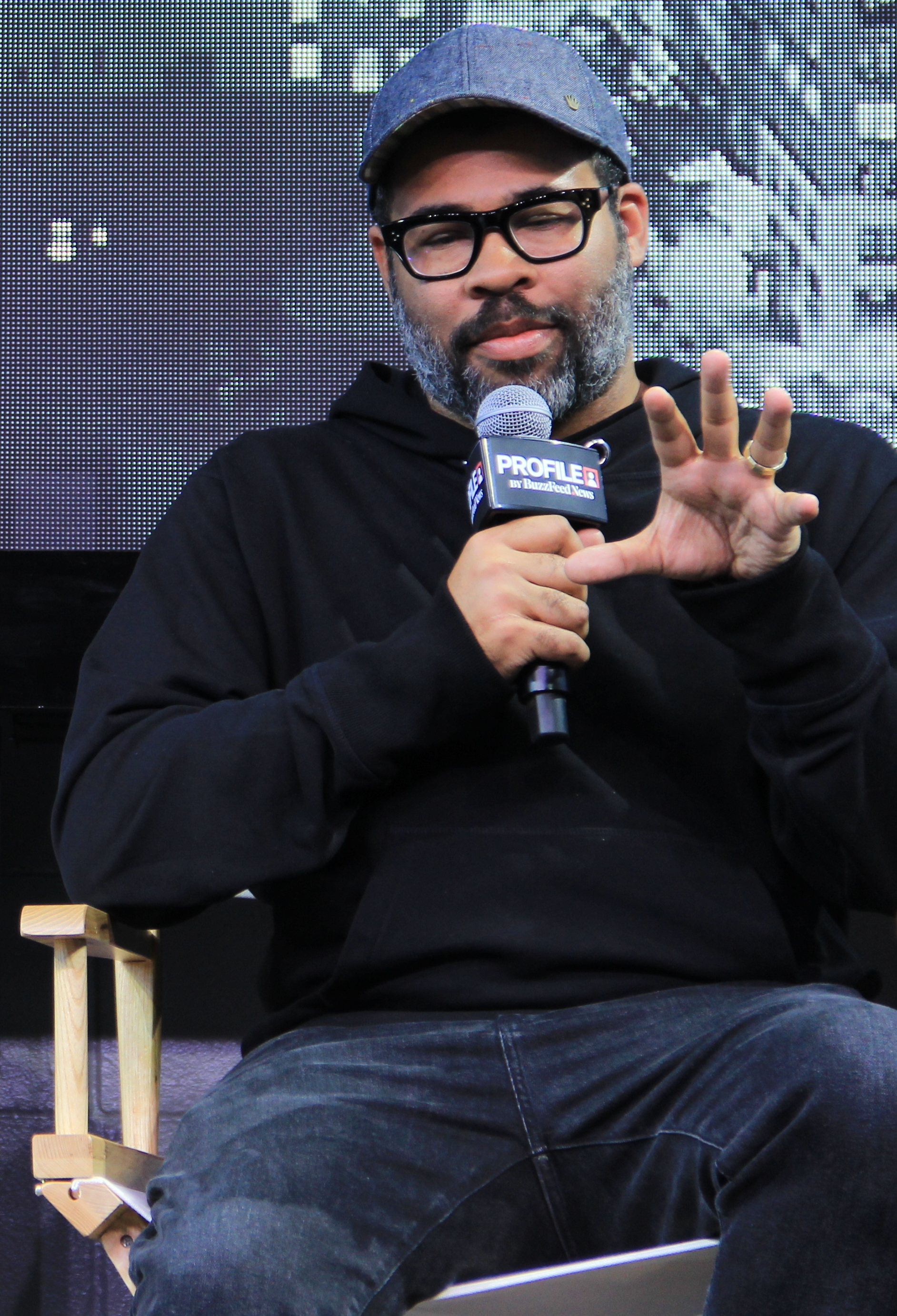
Peele at SXSW in 2019

Jordan Peele is an actor, comedian and filmmaker. He is known for his duo sketch group Key & Peele with Keegan-Michael Key. He has also directed Get Out (2017), Us (2019), and Nope (2022).

== Filmography ==
=== As filmmaker ===
Year	Title	Director	Writer	Producer
2016	Keanu	No	Yes	Yes
2017	Get Out	Yes	Yes	Yes
2018	BlacKkKlansman	No	No	Yes
2019	Us	Yes	Yes	Yes
2021	Candyman	No	Yes	Yes
2022	Honk for Jesus. Save Your Soul.	No	No	Executive
2022	Nope	Yes	Yes	Yes
2022	Wendell & Wild	No	Yes	Yes
2024	Monkey Man	No	No	Yes
2025	Him	No	No	Yes

=== Short films ===
Year	Film	Credit	Notes / Ref(s)
2022	Moshari	Executive producer	
2025	Imago	Executive producer	
2025	Morty	Executive producer	
2025	The Pigs Underneath	Executive producer	
2025	Thick Skin	Executive producer	
2025	Spilled Milk	Executive producer	

=== As actor ===
Year	Title	Role	Notes
2008	Boner Boyz!	D-Rock Peppers	Short film
2010	3B	Rob	Short film
2010	Little Fockers	EMT	
2012	Wanderlust	Rodney Wilson	
2013	The Sidekick	Sidecar Willy	Short film
2016	Keanu	Rell "Tech-Tonic" Williams / Oil Dresden	
2016	Storks	Beta Wolf	Voice
2017	Get Out	Wounded Deer / UNCF Narrator	Voices; Uncredited
2017	Captain Underpants: The First Epic Movie	Melvin Sneedly	Voice
2019	Horror Noire: A History of Black Horror	Himself	Documentary film
2019	Us	Dying Rabbit / Fun House Narrator	Voices; Uncredited
2019	Toy Story 4	Bunny	Voice
2022	The Bob's Burgers Movie	Fanny	Voice
2022	Wendell & Wild	Wild	Voice
2023	Abruptio	Danny	Voice
2023	First Time Female Director	Mystery Coach	

== Television ==
Year	Title	Actor	Writer	Executive Producer	Role	Notes
2003–2008	Mad TV	Yes	Yes	No	Various	94 episodes
2008	Chocolate News	Yes	No	No	Kelvin Melvin	7 episodes
2009	Reno 911!	Yes	No	No	Three-Card Monte Guy	Episode: "Extradition to Thailand"
2009–2010	SuperNews!	Yes	No	No	Various voices	15 episodes
2010–2015	Childrens Hospital	Yes	No	No	Dr. Brian	10 episodes
2011	Love Bites	Yes	No	No	Eli	Episode: "Too Much Information"
2012–2015	Key & Peele	Yes	Yes	Yes	Himself, Various	54 episodes, also co-creator
2013	The Mindy Project	Yes	No	No	Nick	Episode: "Mindy's Minute"
2013	Workaholics	Yes	No	No	Mark	Episode: "The Worst Generation"
2013	Comedy Bang! Bang!	Yes	No	No	Tan Fu	Episode: "Andy Samberg Wears a Plaid Shirt & Glasses"
2013	Modern Family	Yes	No	No	Derrick	Episode: "A Fair to Remember"
2013	Axe Cop	Yes	No	No	Super Axe (voice)	Episode: "Super Axe"
2013–2014	Kroll Show	Yes	No	No	Ref Rondy, Various	2 episodes
2014	Fargo	Yes	No	No	Agent Webb Pepper	4 episodes
2014	Drunk History	Yes	No	No	Percy Julian	Episode: "Montgomery, AL"
2014	Robot Chicken	Yes	No	No	Blade, various voices	2 episodes
2014	Rick and Morty	Yes	No	No	4th-Dimensional Being (voice)	Episode: "A Rickle in Time"
2014–2016	Bob's Burgers	Yes	No	No	Various voices	8 episodes
2015	Life in Pieces	Yes	No	No	Chad	3 episodes
2015	Wet Hot American Summer: First Day of Camp	Yes	No	No	Alan	3 episodes
2015	TripTank	Yes	No	No	Various voices	2 episodes
2015–2018	SuperMansion	Yes	No	No	Bugula (voice)	2 episodes
2016	The Muppets	Yes	No	No	Himself	Episode: "Swine Song"
2016	American Dad!	Yes	No	No	Street Thug (voice)	Episode: "Criss-Cross Applesauce: The Ballad of Billy Jesusworth"
2017–2025	Big Mouth	Yes	No	No	The Ghost of Duke Ellington / various voices	71 episodes
2018	The Shivering Truth	Yes	No	No	Prison Guard	Episode: "Ogled Inklings"
2018–2021	The Last O.G.	No	Yes	Yes	—N/a	40 episodes, also co-creator
2019	Weird City	No	Yes	Yes	—N/a	6 episodes, also co-creator
2019	Lorena	No	No	Yes	—N/a	4 episodes
2019–2020	The Twilight Zone	Yes	Yes	Yes	Host / Narrator	20 episodes
2020–2023	Hunters	No	No	Yes	—N/a	18 episodes
2020	Lovecraft Country	No	No	Yes	—N/a	10 episodes
2024	Scare Tactics	Yes	No	Yes	Host	10 episodes
2025	High Horse: The Black Cowboy	Yes	No	Yes	Himself	3 episodes

== Music videos ==
Year	Title	Role	Artist
2006	"White & Nerdy"	Black Gangster	"Weird Al" Yankovic
2025	"Neverland"	Executive producer	Kid Cudi

== Video games ==
Year	Title	Role	Notes
TBA	OD	—N/a	Writer

== Web series ==
Year	Title	Role	Notes
2013	Epic Rap Battles of History	Martin Luther King Jr.	"Gandhi vs. Martin Luther King Jr."
2014	Epic Rap Battles of History	Muhammad Ali	"Michael Jordan vs. Muhammad Ali"
