= Just Be Bodies =

2026 single by Rose Gray

Single by Rose Gray
- Released: 17 July 2026
- Genre: Electropop; house
- Length: 3:27
- Label: Polydor
- Songwriters: Rose Gray; Justin Tranter; Mattias Per Larsson; Robin Fredriksson
- Producer: Mattman & Robin

Rose Gray singles chronology
"Club to Your Arms" (2026)	"Just Be Bodies" (2026)	"Blink Twice" (2026)

Visualiser
- "Just Be Bodies" on YouTube

"Just Be Bodies" is a song recorded by the English singer-songwriter Rose Gray. It was released by Polydor Records on 17 July 2026 as the second single from her upcoming second studio album. An electropop and house song, Gray wrote "Just Be Bodies" with Justin Tranter and Mattman & Robin, the latter of whom handled the production of the track.

Dubbed a companion to previous single "Club to Your Arms", the lyrical content of "Just Be Bodies" dissects how talking with a romantic partner can sometimes become a barrier to the relationship, instead asking for them to explore their physical connection. It was described by Euphoria as Gray's most vulnerable track to date.

== Background and release ==
Gray released her debut studio album, Louder, Please, in January 2025. The theme of the album was shaped by Gray's adoration of nightlife and clubbing in London. After touring globally in promotion of the record, she began writing and recording new material in the studio and "Club to Your Arms" was eventually released in June 2026 as the lead single from her upcoming second album. Gray felt the song and further upcoming releases to be a continuation of Louder, Please as opposed to a "new era". Having premiered the song at live shows before its release, "Just Be Bodies" was released in July as the second single. An accompanying visualiser was released alongside the track, filmed in San Francisco by Rogue Bonaventura.

== Composition and lyrics ==
Described as an electropop and house song, Gray wrote "Just Be Bodies" with Justin Tranter and Mattman & Robin, the latter of whom handled the production of the track. She found the writing experience to be joyful, describing it as "pure joy like it fell out of [her] mouth". The song was billed as a companion to "Club to Your Arms", which revolves around getting home after a night out. "Just Be Bodies" documents the morning reflection period following a night out. The lyrical content of the song sees Gray sing about how talking with a romantic partner can sometimes become a barrier to the relationship, instead asking for them to explore their physical connection. It dissects Gray's vulnerability as she asks them to "please" provide authentic connection beyond conversation. The lyrics also see Gray express that she will do things out of her comfort zone for her lover, including to drive and fight for them.

Expanding on the connection between "Just Be Bodies" and its predecessor, Gray said it is: "like the sister to 'Club to Your Arms'. They felt right to put out together. I love this song so so much! It makes me feel a million things. It felt right for this new era to put them out together so you can enjoy them as a lil piece of art and the beginning of this new chapter. There's a lot more to come but I wanted to give you them both this summer. [...] It's so emo and beautiful. I wrote it about getting later into my twenties and feeling so much more in my body. Things are only getting better and nobody ever really talks about that part of growing up. Like it's not all doom."

== Critical reception ==
Nikos Aggelis Anthis, writing for Euphoria, praised the song and felt it was "tailor-made for the dancefloor", finding it to be captivating through Gray's "sincerity, intimacy, and quiet confidence of her performance". Anthis described it as Gray's most vulnerable track to date and appreciated that Gray did not seem set on becoming "another fleeting pop star built on mainstream hits", but instead had carved out a distinct musical identity.

== Credits and personnel ==
Credits adapted from Spotify.

- Rose Gray – vocals, songwriting
- Justin Tranter – songwriting
- Mattman & Robin – songwriting, production, programming, keyboard, bass, drums
- Tom Norris – mixing engineer
- Victor Verpillat – additional mixing engineer
- Idania Valencia – mastering engineer

== Release history ==
Region	Date	Format	Label	Ref.
Various	17 July 2026	Digital download; streaming	Polydor Records	
Various	27 November 2026	7" Vinyl (RSD Black Friday	Polydor Records	
