= Marble soda =

Marble soda may refer to:

- Marble soda or Ramune, a Japanese carbonated soft drink sealed with a marble
- "Marble Soda", a 2015 song by Shawn Wasabi
