= Neverland (Kid Cudi song) =

Single by Kid Cudi

from the album Free
- A-side: "Grave"
- Released: May 9, 2025
- Genre: Alternative rock
- Length: 3:56
- Label: Republic; Wicked Awesome
- Songwriters: Justin Tranter; Cleo Tighe; Scott Mescudi; Shawn Serrano; Daniel Crean; Jean-Baptiste Kouame; Rami Eadeh; Matthew Spatola
- Producers: Kid Cudi; Justin Tranter; Shawn Wasabi; Ramii; Matty Spats; Daniel Crean

Kid Cudi singles chronology
"Forever" (2025)	"Neverland" (2025)	"Grave" (2025)

Lyric video
- "Neverland" on YouTube

"Neverland" is a song by American rapper Kid Cudi. It was released on May 9, 2025, by Republic and Wicked Awesome Records, as the lead single from his album Free. The video for the song appeared at the 2025 Tribeca Film Festival.

Cudi performed the song in Snapchat's Under the Ghost music performance series, being the first artist to do so.
