= Angel of Satisfaction =

2024 single by Rose Gray

Single by Rose Gray

from the album Louder, Please
- Released: 14 August 2024
- Genre: Art pop; house; electropop
- Length: 3:30
- Label: PIAS
- Songwriters: Rose Gray; Justin Tranter; Ryland Blackinton; Vaughn Oliver
- Producers: Ryland Blackinton; Vaughn Oliver

Rose Gray singles chronology
"Free" (2024)	"Angel of Satisfaction" (2024)	"Switch" (2024)

Music video
- "Angel of Satisfaction" on YouTube

"Angel of Satisfaction" is a song recorded by English singer-songwriter Rose Gray. It was released by Play It Again Sam on 14 August 2024 as the second single from her debut studio album, Louder, Please (2025). Gray co-wrote the song with Justin Tranter, Ryland Blackinton and Vaughn Oliver, with the latter two producing it.

An art pop, house and electropop song, the lyrical content of "Angel of Satisfaction" explores a "tongue-in-cheek" approach to the dark side of the musical industry. Gray loosely based the song on a dream she had where an angel visited her with a warning about fame and fortune. The song was praised by critics and it was likened to the works of Lady Gaga and Robyn. Gray herself has admitted that if she was solely a songwriter, she would have pitched the track to Gaga. It was remixed for Gray's reissue album, A Little Louder, Please, with a feature from Jade.

== Background and release ==
"Angel of Satisfaction" followed "Free", the lead single from Gray's then-unannounced debut studio album. Gray loosely based the song on a dream she had where an angel visited her with a warning about fame and fortune. The lyrics also explore themes of temptation and being blessed. Gray has described "Angel of Satisfaction" as a "tongue-in-cheek" song about "whoring for the glory", referencing the darkness of the music industry. She clarified that she values simplicity, but found it tempting to "dip [her] toes into" the darkness. Despite Gray feeling on the "outskirts" of the industry, she recalled moments of being at parties, looking around and wondering "is this it? Is this everything you wanted?", a feeling she incorporated into the lyrics.

"Angel of Satisfaction" incorporates art pop, house and electropop. It was also said to be "reminiscent of 90s Europop". Gray co-wrote the song with Justin Tranter, Ryland Blackinton and Vaughn Oliver, with the latter two producing it. After the announcement of her debut album, Louder, Please (2025), Gray stated that "Angel of Satisfaction" was her "personal favourite". She also admitted that if she was solely a songwriter, she would attempt to pitch the song to Lady Gaga. In October 2025, it was announced that the song would be remixed for a reissue of Louder, Please, a deluxe remix album titled A Little Louder, Please, with the new version featuring Jade.

== Critical reception ==
Michael Cragg of The Guardian described the song as "campy" and compared its chorus to the work of Lady Gaga. Euphoria's Nmesoma Okechukwu wrote that the track "took [her] unawares" and complimented the beat. Rishi Shah, writing a Louder, Please album review for NME, appreciated the song's placement on the album. He found that it "dispelled the notion" of the project falling into "rinse and repeat territory" since it stood out amongst other tracks before it. Shah also remarked that the bass of "Angel of Satisfaction" could "give every bassline on Dua Lipa's Future Nostalgia a run for its money". Ludovic Hunter-Tilney of the Financial Times likened the song to Robyn.

== Credits and personnel ==
Credits adapted from Spotify.

- Rose Gray – vocals, songwriting
- Justin Tranter – songwriting
- Ryland Blackinton – songwriting, production
- Vaughn Oliver – songwriting, production

== Release history ==
Region	Date	Format	Label	Ref.
Various	14 August 2024	Digital download; streaming	Polydor Records	
