= G3 (British magazine) =

g3
- February 2012 cover of g3
- Categories: Bisexuality and lesbianism
- Circulation: 40,000
- Publisher: Square Peg Media
- Founded: 2001
- Final issue: 2013 (print)
- Country: United Kingdom
- Website: g3mag.co.uk

g3 was a publication targeted towards lesbian and bisexual women in the United Kingdom. It was distributed free of charge and made available in hard copy from gay bars, clubs, cafés and groups; after it ceasing printed publishing in 2013, it was for a time distributed in PDF format on the g3 website, but that too ceased to be updated in 2016. g3 won the Publication of the Year award from Stonewall in 2009.

g3 was published by Square Peg Media. It was launched in 2001 by Lisa Knight and Sarah Garrett with a circulation of 5,000, and reached a print run of 40,000, and an estimated total readership of 140,000, before ceasing print publication in August 2013. The magazine's content included celebrity interviews, features, and regular travel, music, film, fashion, arts, community and parenting sections. g3 also provided detailed listings for gay bars and clubs across the UK.

== See also ==
- Bisexual community
- List of lesbian periodicals
- List of LGBT periodicals
