= Forever (Dom Dolla and Kid Cudi song) =

2025 single by Dom Dolla and Kid Cudi

Single by Dom Dolla and Kid Cudi
- Released: 18 April 2025
- Genre: EDM; pop rap
- Length: 4:11
- Label: Good Fortune Music
- Songwriters: Dominic Matheson; Scott Mescudi
- Producer: Dom Dolla

Dom Dolla singles chronology
| "Dreamin'" (2025) | "Forever" (2025) | "No Room for a Saint" (2025) |

Kid Cudi singles chronology
| "At the Party" (2023) | "Forever" (2025) | "Neverland" (2025) |

"Forever" is a song by Australian record producer Dom Dolla and American rapper Kid Cudi. It debuted at Madison Square Garden in March 2025 and was officially released on 18 April 2025.

== Background and release ==
Dom Dolla and Kid Cudi met early in 2025. Dom confessed to The Music that he was a "massive fan of Kid Cudi" and they agreed to work together. Dom Dolla said "We set ourselves the challenge of writing the happiest song we could. Everyone knows the world is going through a pretty wild time at the moment, so we wanted to transport listeners to another time and place." About the song, Kid Cudi said "This resurrects all those cherished memories that kids had back when they were younger... it feels like 2010 again."

== Reception ==
EDM said "'Forever' is the euphoric sound of dancing in zero gravity. Dolla's club sensibility meets Cudi's existential cool, and together they find the sweet spot where real anthems live." Jade Kennedy from Rolling Stone Australia called it "feel good" and a "euphoric, nostalgia-laced single".

== Charts ==
=== Weekly charts ===
Weekly chart performance for "Forever"
| Chart (2025) | Peak position |
|---|---|
| CIS Airplay (TopHit) | 47 |
| Kazakhstan Airplay (TopHit) | 34 |
| New Zealand Hot Singles (RMNZ) | 4 |
| Russia Airplay (TopHit) | 32 |
| US Hot Dance/Electronic Songs (Billboard) | 9 |

=== Monthly charts ===
Monthly chart performance for "Forever"
| Chart (2025) | Peak position |
|---|---|
| CIS Airplay (TopHit) | 50 |
| Kazakhstan Airplay (TopHit) | 32 |
| Russia Airplay (TopHit) | 34 |
