= Club to Your Arms =

2026 single by Rose Gray

Single by Rose Gray
- Released: 12 June 2026
- Recorded: 2025
- Genre: Dance-pop; house
- Length: 3:11
- Label: Polydor
- Songwriters: Rose Gray; Zhone; Justin Tranter
- Producer: Zhone

Rose Gray singles chronology
"Lotus" (2025)	"Club to Your Arms" (2026)	"Just Be Bodies" (2026)

Music video
- "Club to Your Arms" on YouTube

"Club to Your Arms" is a song recorded by the English singer-songwriter Rose Gray. It was released by Polydor Records on 12 June 2026 as the lead single from her upcoming second studio album. A dance-pop and house song, Gray co-wrote it with Zhone and Justin Tranter; Zhone also handled the production.

The lyrical content of "Club to Your Arms" revolves around Gray's experiences between leaving a nightclub and getting home, romanticising the idea of being with her romantic partner after a night of drinking. Her experiences of clubbing have often inspired her songs, but she realised she had not yet written about the period of time between being out and getting home. The song and its accompanying music video was praised by critics including Rolling Stone UK and Melodic, who complimented the lyricism, Gray's vocals and the production.

== Background and release ==
Gray released her debut studio album, Louder, Please, on 17 January 2025. The theme of the album was shaped by Gray's adoration of nightlife and clubbing in London. Throughout 2025, she toured globally in promotion of Louder, Please, as well as enjoying the nightlife in the places she visited. Upon returning to London at the conclusion of 2025, she found the experience chaotic, recalling sitting on suitcases outside of her house, having lost her keys. A week later, she began writing and recording new material in the studio and "Club to Your Arms" was formed instantly based on Gray's experiences of the year. Gray clarified that although the song is the first release from her upcoming second album, she felt it to be a continuation of Louder, Please as opposed to a "new era". She previewed the song at various shows and sets of hers, including Primavera Sound, before officially releasing the song through Polydor Records on 12 June 2026.

== Composition and lyrics ==
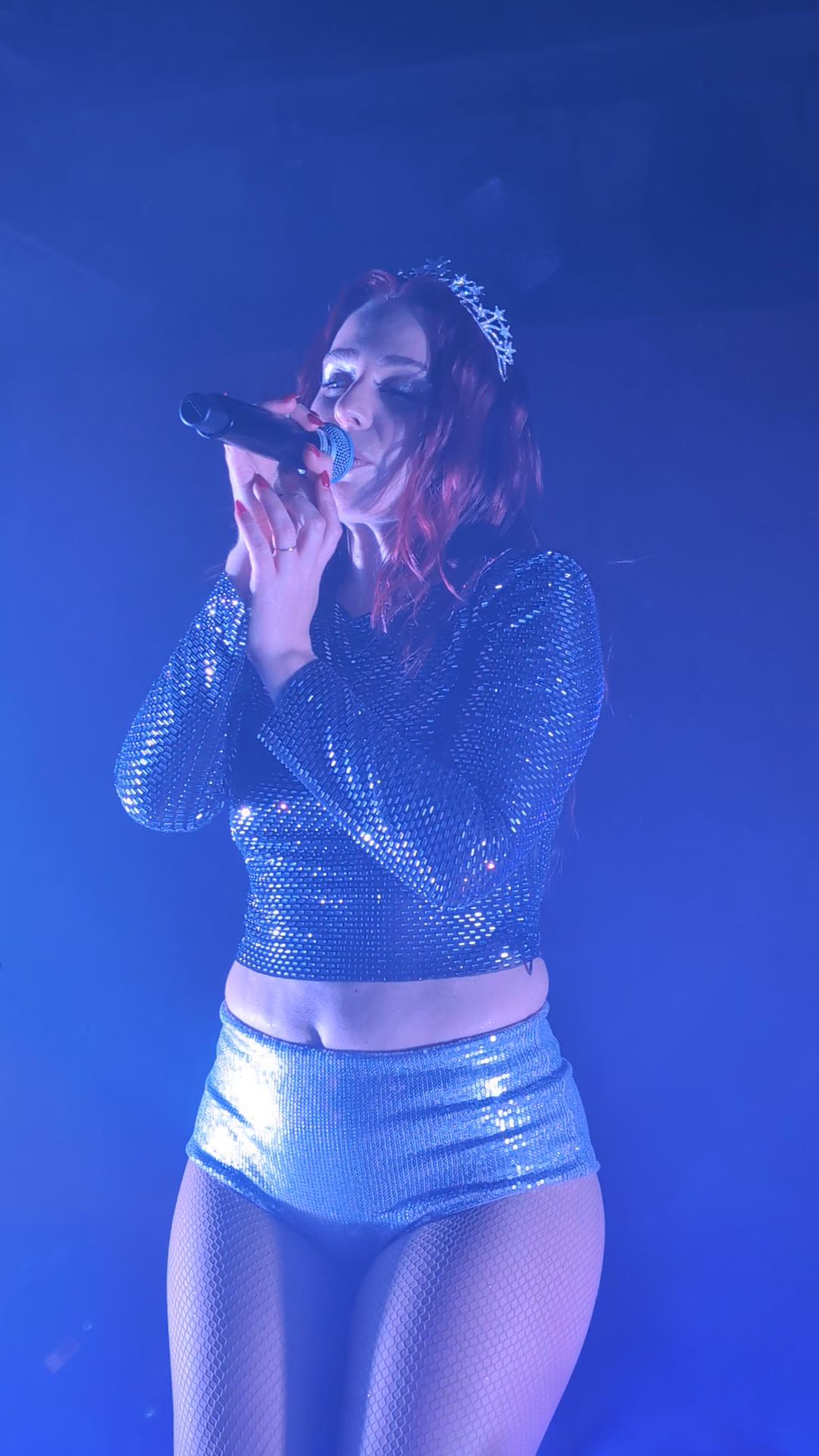
Gray had wanted to write a song like "Club to Your Arms" for years.

"Club to Your Arms" has been billed as a dance-pop and house song. Described as a "wistful, trance-infused" song, Gray took inspiration for "Club to Your Arms" from artists including Rihanna and Madonna. It features a synth-heavy production and a building dance beat, as well as commanding vocals from Gray. She admitted that she liked to "speak-sing" on tracks but felt that she is a vocalist and wanted to showcase her vocal ability on the song, noting that she was "channeling [her] big pop-girl voice".

Gray co-wrote "Club to Your Arms" with Zhone and Justin Tranter; Zhone also handled the production of the track. In the studio, she realised she had not yet written about the space between being out and coming home. She suggested the song's title to her co-writers, initially doubting that it made sense, but soon gained assurance from herself that the concept of going from the club to someone's arms made sense and worked as a song. The lyrical content of the song revolves around making her way home following a night of clubbing and being excited to be in her partner's arms. She had wanted to write about the topic for a while since she had experienced nights like that so much throughout her life. Once Gray had written the song, she felt it had become an "entry point" for the rest of her second album, citing it as a breakthrough for the body of work.

She admitted that her goal when writing songs was often to express feelings she had not heard spoken about in songs, and although having an affinity for dance production, she clarified that her songs would always be driven by narrative. Gray explained: "You know magic hour traveling home from being out, sun coming up over your favourite city... Making your way home to your lover. It's so sexy and cinematic." The song's lyrics also address Gray's rise to notoriety, joking about the fatigue of being a showgirl and feeling the pressure, but she clarifies that she has never felt better.

== Music video ==
Alongside the release of "Club to Your Arms", an accompanying music video was released. It was shot on film in London across a two-day shoot. Gray has stated that she loves releasing accompanying visuals for her songs and noticed the increase in budget for this video in contrast to those from her debut. The video was directed by Tess Lochanski in her directorial debut; she was passionate about the song and its story, noting that the music video had to be sexy. The video sees Gray running and dancing around London, making her way home from a night out and being sexually intimate with a romantic partner. She referenced the phenomenon of "Gay Guy Music Video Night", in which queer people play various music videos whilst drinking together. Gray grew up participating in them and hoped that the music video for "Club to Your Arms" would be included in people's own versions.

== Critical reception ==
Nmesoma Okechukwu, writing for Euphoria, praised Gray's vocals. She acknowledged that it was hard to perform vocally on an EDM track and therefore found it a "testament to her impressive vocal chops". Rolling Stone UK praised the "enormous" song, highlighting its "huge chorus and euphoric synths". Melodic's August Nguyen wrote: "the party people's princess is back" and praised the track for its "perfected pop song structure, hooky synths, and introspective lyricism".

== Credits and personnel ==
Credits adapted from Spotify.

- Rose Gray – vocals, songwriting
- Zhone – songwriting, production, programming, keyboard, bass, drums
- Justin Tranter – songwriting, executive producer
- Tom Norris – mixing engineer
- Victor Verpillat – additional mixing engineer
- Idania Valencia – mastering engineer

== Release history ==
Region	Date	Format	Label	Ref.
Various	12 June 2026	Digital download; streaming	Polydor Records	
Various	27 November 2026	7" Vinyl (RSD Black Friday	Polydor Records	
