= African-American Film Critics Association Awards 2017 =

Annual US film awards ceremony

15th African-American Film Critics Association Awards
- Date: February 7, 2018

Highlights
- Best Picture: Get Out
- Independent film: Crown Heights
- Animation: Coco
- Documentary: Step
- Best Comedy Series: Black-ish
- Best Drama Series: Queen Sugar

The 2017 African-American Film Critics Association Awards were announced on December 12, 2017, while the ceremony took place on February 7, 2018, at Taglyan Complex in Hollywood, California.

== Awards ==
Below is the list of complete winners.

=== AAFCA Top Ten Films ===
1. Get Out (Universal Pictures)
2. Three Billboards Outside Ebbing, Missouri (Fox Searchlight)
3. Coco (Walt Disney Pictures/Pixar Animation Studios)
4. Girls Trip (Universal Pictures)
5. Detroit (Annapurna Pictures)
6. Call Me by Your Name (Sony Pictures Classics)
7. The Shape of Water (Fox Searchlight)
8. Gook (Samuel Goldwyn Films)
9. Crown Heights (Amazon Studios/IFC Films)
10. Marshall (Open Road Films)

=== AAFCA Top Ten TV Shows ===
1. Queen Sugar (OWN)
2. Underground (WGN)
3. Insecure (HBO)
4. Master of None (Netflix)
5. Black-ish (ABC)
6. The Handmaid's Tale (Hulu)
7. Dear White People (Netflix)
8. She's Gotta Have It (Netflix)
9. The Defiant Ones (HBO)
10. Guerrilla / Snowfall (Showtime / FX)

=== AAFCA Regular Awards ===
Best Picture

- Get Out

Best Director

- Jordan Peele – Get Out

Best Actor

- Daniel Kaluuya – Get Out

Best Actress

- Frances McDormand – Three Billboards Outside Ebbing, Missouri

Best Supporting Actor

- Laurence Fishburne – Last Flag Flying

Best Supporting Actress

- Tiffany Haddish – Girls Trip

Best Ensemble

- Detroit

Best Comedy

- Girls Trip

Best Independent Film

- Crown Heights

Best Screenplay

- Jordan Peele – Get Out

Breakout Performance

- Lakeith Stanfield – Crown Heights

Best Animated Film

- Coco

Best Documentary

- Step

Best Foreign Film

- The Wound

Best Song

- "It Ain't Fair" – Detroit

Best TV Comedy

- Black-ish

Best TV Drama

- Queen Sugar

Best New Media

- Mudbound

=== AAFCA Special Awards ===
AAFCA Special Achievement Award

- Jordan Peele, writer/director; Broderick Johnson and Andrew Kosove, producers; Claudia Puig, film critic; Channing Dungey, producer

== See also ==
- 2017 in film
