= April (song) =

2025 single by Rose Gray

Single by Rose Gray

from the album A Little Louder, Please
- Released: 12 September 2025
- Genre: Club-pop
- Length: 3:15
- Label: Polydor
- Songwriters: Rose Gray; Alex Drury
- Producer: Alex Metric

Rose Gray singles chronology
"Everything Changes (But I Won't)" (2025)	"April" (2025)	"Lotus" (2025)

Visualiser
- "April" on YouTube

"April" is a song recorded by the English singer-songwriter Rose Gray. It was released by Polydor Records on 12 September 2025 as the second single from A Little Louder, Please, the deluxe edition of Gray's debut studio album, Louder, Please (2025). Gray co-wrote the song with Alex Drury; Drury also handled the production of the track.

Following the genre of the original album, "April" is a club-pop song and Gray views it as "the big sister" of Louder, Please. The lyrical content of "April" explores a woman that Gray met on a night out, describing her as a carefree, sexy woman on the dancefloor who made her want to live more.

== Background and release ==
Gray released her debut studio album, Louder, Please, on 17 January 2025. The composition of the album was shaped by Gray's adoration of nightlife and clubbing in London. In August of that year, she released a remix of album track "Everything Changes (But I Won't)", featuring Shygirl and Casey MQ. The next month, Gray announced that a deluxe edition to the album would be released, titled A Little Louder, Please. "April" was released alongside the announcement.

A club-pop song, Clash magazine wrote that "April" is "a slinky ode to living in the moment and an extension of the distilled dance euphoria she explored on [Louder, Please]". They also likened the track to "post-millennia Clubland glory". AntiMusic also described the song as "shimmering" and "carefree". Gray stated that she views "April" as "the big sister" and an extension to the original album. Speaking about the meaning of the song, Gray said: "have you ever met someone out and just thought, whatever 'it' is, you've got it? Carefree, sexy and completely in their body. That's what 'April' is about." She added that the subject of the song was someone she met on a club dancefloor who made her want to live more. Gray co-wrote the song with Alex Drury, with Alex Metric producing it. A visualiser was also released for "April", directed by Rauri Cantelo.

== Credits and personnel ==
Credits adapted from Spotify.

- Rose Gray – vocals, songwriting
- Alex Drury – songwriting, production
- Dan Grech-Marguerat – mixing engineer, programming
- Stuart Hawkes – mastering engineer

== Release history ==
Region	Date	Format	Label	Ref.
Various	12 September 2025	Digital download; streaming	Polydor Records	
