= Rose Gray =

British singer (born 1996)

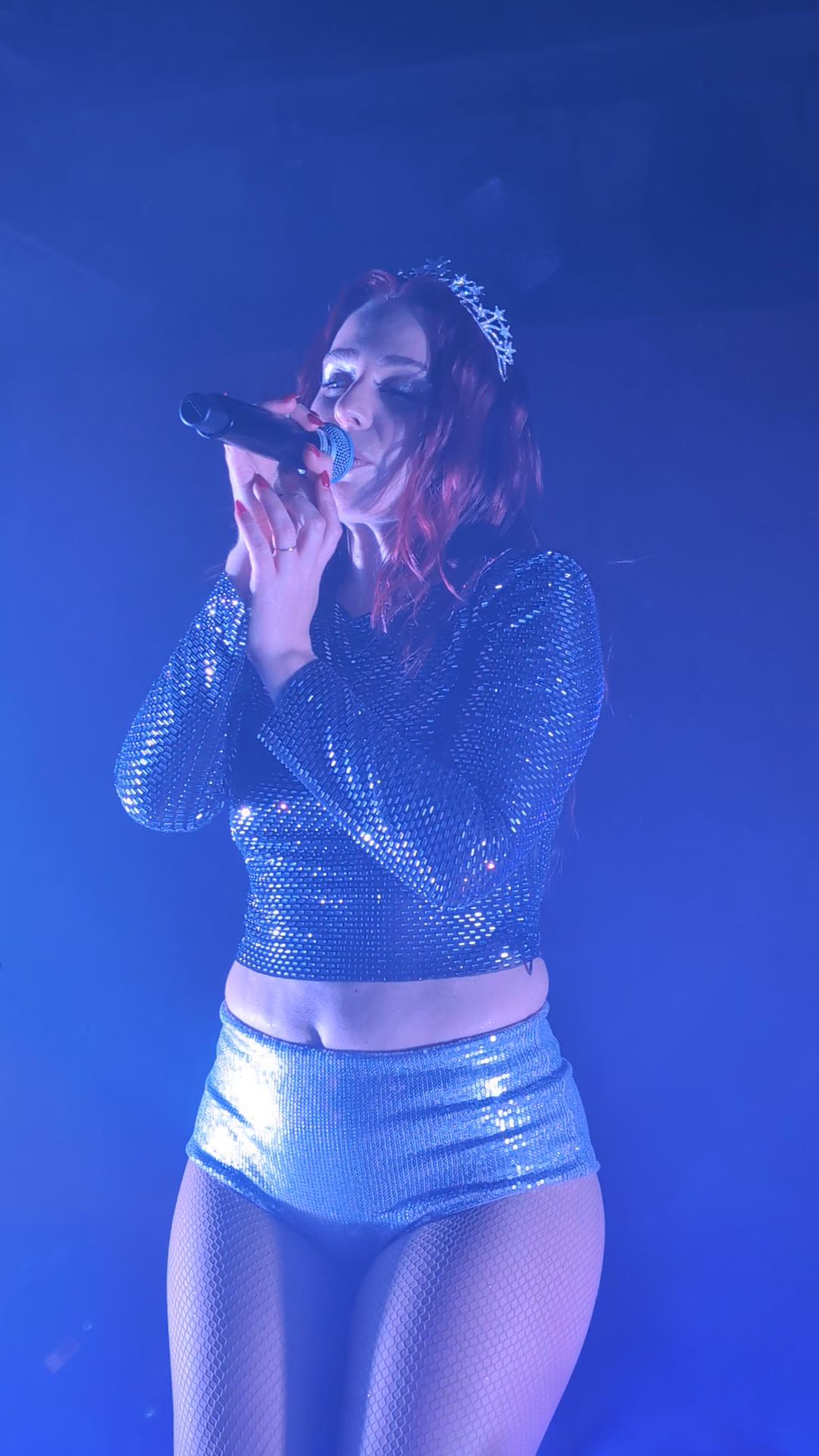
- Gray in 2026

Background information
- Born: Rosie May Hudson-Edmonds; 31 December 1996 (age 29); London, England
- Genres: Pop; dance; electropop
- Occupations: Singer; songwriter
- Instrument: Vocals
- Years active: 2019–present
- Labels: On the Blue Line; PIAS; Polydor
- Spouse: Harris Dickinson (m. 2026)

Rosie May Hudson-Edmonds (born 31 December 1996), known professionally as Rose Gray, is an English singer and songwriter. She began releasing music in 2019, releasing numerous singles and a mixtape, Dancing, Drinking, Talking, Thinking (2021), before being signed to Polydor. With PIAS, Gray has released two extended plays, Syncronicity (2022) and Higher Than the Sun (2023), and her debut album, Louder, Please (2025). In 2026, she was nominated for the Critics' Choice award at the Brit Awards.

== Early and personal life ==
Rosie May Hudson-Edmonds was born on 31 December 1996 in a paddling pool in her parents' flat in Muswell Hill, in the London Borough of Haringey. Gray has stated that her love for music was inspired by her mother and stepfather, who are both actors. As a child, her stepfather encouraged her to work on music with him.

Whilst in secondary school, she began dating actor Harris Dickinson. Two of Gray's music videos, for her songs "Blue" and "Afraid of Nothing," were directed by Dickinson. The couple got married on 13 May 2026 in a civil ceremony at Islington Town Hall.

== Career ==
=== 2010–2023: Early career ===
Aged 14, Gray reached the final of Open Mic UK 2010. She then signed to a record label and wrote over 100 songs for them. However, she decided she wanted to leave, but was unable to keep any of her original music. Gray then became immersed in London's nightlife and briefly worked on the door at Fabric. After a brief period of not making music, Gray began slowly releasing singles and writing for other artists. She released "Good Life", her debut single, in 2019.

After numerous single releases, in 2021, Gray released her debut mixtape, Dancing, Drinking, Talking, Thinking. DIY praised Gray for the project and billed her as "a name to watch". A year later, after being signed to Polydor, she released an extended play (EP), Synchronicity (2022), followed by another EP, Higher Than the Sun (2023). In 2023, she released the single "Happiness", as well as collaborating with French DJ Kungs on "Afraid of Nothing". She was also one of 11 selected female singers to feature on "Call Me a Lioness", a song recorded in support of the England women's national football team at the FIFA Women's World Cup.

=== 2025–present: Louder, Please and upcoming second album ===
Having remained involved in clubs and nightlife, Gray began playing unannounced sets in clubs weekly and enjoyed seeing the positive response to her music, both released and unreleased. In July 2024, Gray released "Free" as the lead single from her then unreleased debut album. She later released the second single, "Angel of Satisfaction", a month later. Then in September 2024, she announced that the title of her first album was Louder, Please, as well as releasing "Switch" as a single. The album was released on 17 January 2025, for which Gray later embarked on a UK tour to promote it. She also supported Sugababes on their Sugababes '25 Tour, as well as Kesha and the Scissor Sisters on The Tits Out Tour. She released a deluxe edition of her debut album in October 2025, titled A Little Louder, Please. As well as featuring singles "April" and "Lotus", it also included collaborations with Melanie C, Jade, Shygirl and Casey MQ, as well as various remixes and club edits.

In early 2026, Gray was featured on a remix of Demi Lovato's song "Joshua Tree" from Lovato's album, It's Not That Deep (Unless You Want It To Be). Gray admitted that she had messaged Lovato on Instagram asking to be on a remix of the song since it was Gray's favourite from the record. After no reply for months, Lovato responded by inviting her onto the song as she was a fan of Gray's music. In June, Gray released "Club to Your Arms" as the lead single from her upcoming second album. "Just Be Bodies" followed a month later.

== Discography ==
=== Studio albums ===
| Title | Details | Peak chart positions | | |
| Title | Details | UK Ind. | UK Sales | SCO |
|---|---|---|---|---|
| Louder, Please | Released: 17 January 2025; Label: PIAS; Format: CD, LP, digital download, streaming | 17 | 37 | 50 |

==== Reissues ====
| Title | Details |
|---|---|
| A Little Louder, Please | Released: 24 October 2025; Label: Polydor; Format: CD, LP, digital download, streaming |

=== Extended plays ===
| Title | Details |
|---|---|
| Synchronicity | Released: 12 July 2022; Label: PIAS; Format: Digital download, streaming |
| Higher Than the Sun | Released: 1 February 2023; Label: PIAS; Format: Digital download, streaming |

=== Mixtapes ===
| Title | Details |
|---|---|
| Dancing, Drinking, Talking, Thinking | Released: 22 January 2021; Label: On the Blue Line; Format: Digital download, streaming |

=== Singles ===
==== As main artist ====
List of singles released as main artist, showing year released and album name
| Title | Year | Peak chart positions | | Album |
| Title | Year | UK Phys. | LTU Air. | Album |
|---|---|---|---|---|
| "Good Life" | 2019 | — | — | Non-album singles |
| "Blue" | 2019 | — | — | Non-album singles |
| "High Again" | 2019 | — | — | Non-album singles |
| "Same Cloud" | 2020 | — | — | Dancing, Drinking, Talking, Thinking |
| "Nothing Can Stop Us" | 2020 | — | — | Dancing, Drinking, Talking, Thinking |
| "Save Your Tears" | 2020 | — | — | Dancing, Drinking, Talking, Thinking |
| "Last Song" | 2022 | — | — | Synchronicity |
| "Synchronicity" | 2022 | — | — | Synchronicity |
| "Prettier Than You" | 2022 | — | — | Higher Than the Sun |
| "Promise Me" | 2022 | — | — | Higher Than the Sun |
| "Happiness" | 2023 | — | — | Non-album singles |
| "Afraid of Nothing" (featuring Kungs) | 2023 | — | — | Non-album singles |
| "Free" | 2024 | — | — | Louder, Please |
| "Angel of Satisfaction" | 2024 | — | — | Louder, Please |
| "Switch" | 2024 | — | — | Louder, Please |
| "Wet & Wild" | 2024 | — | — | Louder, Please |
| "Party People" | 2024 | — | — | Louder, Please |
| "Attention!" (with Kesha and Slayyyter) | 2025 | — | — | Period (...) |
| "Everything Changes (But I Won't)" (featuring Shygirl and Casey MQ) | 2025 | — | — | A Little Louder, Please |
| "April" | 2025 | 60 | — | A Little Louder, Please |
| "Lotus" | 2025 | — | — | A Little Louder, Please |
| "Club to Your Arms" | 2026 | — | — | TBA |
| "Just Be Bodies" | 2026 | — | — | TBA |
| "Blink Twice" | 2026 | — | 90 | TBA |
"—" denotes items which were not released in that country or failed to chart.

==== As featured artist ====
List of singles released as a featured artist, showing year released and album name
| Title | Year | Album |
|---|---|---|
| "Call Me a Lioness" (Hope FC featuring Olivia Dean, Melanie C, Al Greenwood, Self Esteem, Ellie Rowsell, Marika Hackman, Rachel Chinouriri, Shura, Jasmine Jetwa, Rose Gray and Highlyy) | 2023 | Non-album singles |
| "The Touch" (Clipz featuring Rose Gray) | 2024 | Non-album singles |
| "Tidal" (Ben Hemsley and Ferry Corsten featuring Rose Gray) | 2024 | Inner Untitled |
| "Girls" (TSHA featuring Rose Gray) | 2024 | Sad Girl |

==== Guest appearances ====
| Title | Year | Other artist(s) | Album |
|---|---|---|---|
| "Joshua Tree" | 2026 | Demi Lovato | It's Not That Deep (Unless You Want It To Be) |
| "My Darlin'" | 2026 | Marlon Hoffstadt | Das Ist Daddy |
| "Meet Me on the Dance Floor'" | 2026 | —N/a | Steps (film) |
| "All Again'" | 2026 | —N/a | Grand Theft Auto VI: The Album |

== Tours ==
=== Headlining ===
- Louder, Please Tour (2025)

=== Supporting ===
- Sugababes – Sugababes '25 Tour (2025)
- Kesha and Scissor Sisters – The Tits Out Tour (2025)
- Tove Lo – Estrus Tour (2026)

== Awards and nominations ==
| Year | Ceremony | Category | Nominated work | Result | Ref. |
|---|---|---|---|---|---|
| 2023 | Berlin Music Video Awards | Best Low Budget | "Promise Me" | Nominated | |
| 2026 | Berlin Music Video Awards | Best Editor | "I Don't Speak French" | Nominated | |
| 2026 | Brit Awards | Critics' Choice | Herself | Nominated | |
