= Jordan Peele =

American actor, comedian, and filmmaker (born 1979)

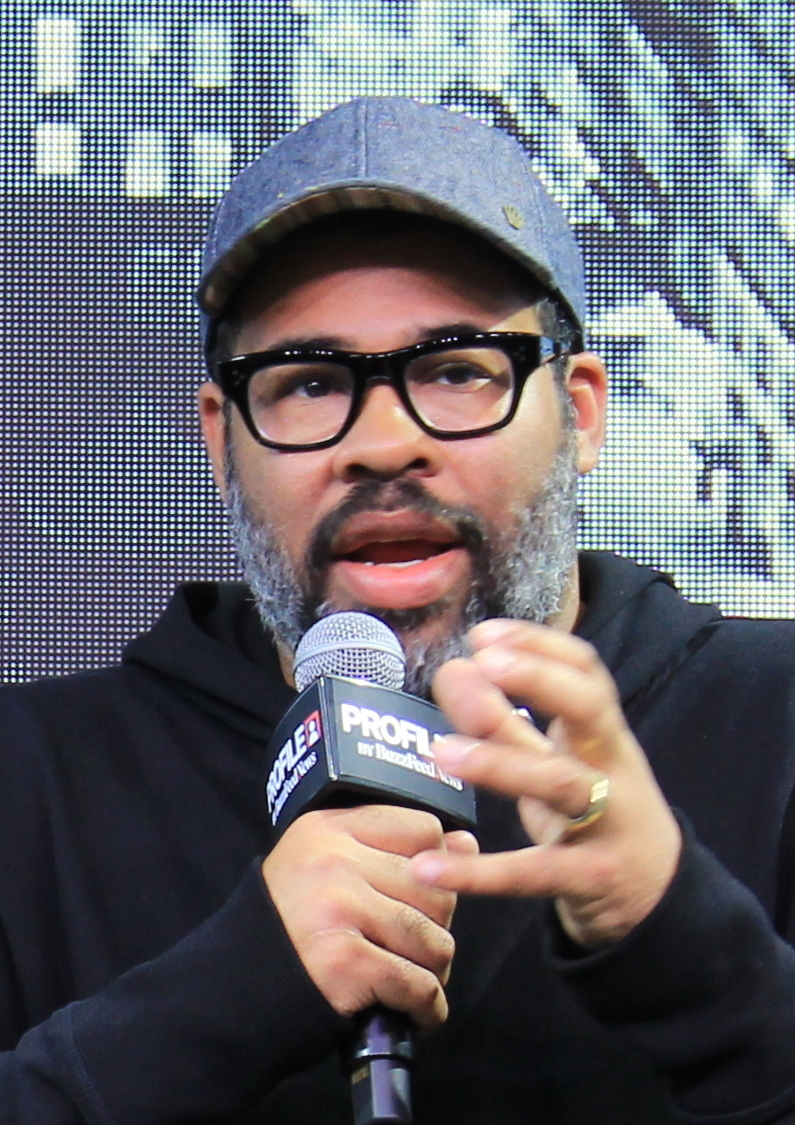
- Peele in 2019
- Born: Jordan Haworth Peele; February 21, 1979 (age 47); New York City, U.S.
- Occupations: Actor; comedian; filmmaker
- Years active: 2002–present
- Works: Full list
- Spouse: Chelsea Peretti (m. 2016)
- Children: 1
- Awards: Full list

Jordan Haworth Peele (born February 21, 1979) is an American actor, comedian, and filmmaker known for his film and television work in the comedy and horror genres. He has received various accolades, including an Academy Award and a Primetime Emmy Award. Peele started his career in comedy before transitioning to writing and directing psychological horror with comedic elements.

In the early 2000s Peele began his career in improv comedy and performed with Boom Chicago and The Second City. His breakout role came in 2003 when he was hired as a cast member on the Fox sketch comedy series Mad TV, where he spent five seasons, leaving the show in 2008. In the following years Peele and his frequent Mad TV collaborator, Keegan-Michael Key, created and starred in their own Comedy Central sketch comedy series Key & Peele (2012–2015). The series was critically acclaimed, winning two Primetime Emmy Awards and a Peabody Award. The two wrote, produced, and starred in the comedy film Keanu (2016) and have appeared in various projects since.

His 2017 directorial debut, the horror film Get Out, was a critical and box office success for which he received numerous accolades, including the Academy Award for Best Original Screenplay, along with nominations for Best Picture and Best Director. He received another Academy Award nomination for Best Picture for producing Spike Lee's comedy-drama BlacKkKlansman (2018). He directed, wrote, and produced the films Us (2019) and Nope (2022). Critics have since frequently named Us, Nope, and in particular Get Out as among the best films of the 21st century.

He founded the film and television production company Monkeypaw Productions in 2012. He co-wrote and produced Candyman (2021) and Wendell and Wild (2022), co-starring in the latter. Peele has also voice-acted in the animated films Storks (2016), Captain Underpants: The First Epic Movie (2017), and Toy Story 4 (2019), as well as in the adult animated sitcom Big Mouth (2017–2025). He co-created the TBS comedy series The Last O.G. (2018–2022) and the YouTube Premium comedy series Weird City (2019). He also served as the host and producer of the Paramount+ revival of the anthology series The Twilight Zone (2019–2020).

== Early life ==
Peele was born in New York City on February 21, 1979. His mother, Lucinda Williams (no relation to the identically named singer-songwriter), is white and from Maryland. His father, Hayward Peele Jr. (died 1999), was African American, originally from North Carolina. Peele last saw his father when he was seven years old and was raised by his single mother on Manhattan's Upper West Side. Peele had been a cinephile ever since he was a young child and decided at 12 that he wanted to be a film director. Peele states that the moment he knew he had a gift of some sort occurred at a camp where he told a scary campfire story and noticed his own fear had disappeared. With a new sense of power, he realized that if he created the horror, there was no reason to be scared of it—something he took with him when he decided to direct film. In addition he states that Glory, Edward Scissorhands, Thelma & Louise, and Aliens were films that had a strong effect on him. He attended the Computer School in Manhattan, graduated from The Calhoun School on Manhattan's Upper West Side in 1997 after securing a scholarship to attend the private school, and went on to Sarah Lawrence College, where he declared a major in puppetry. After two years, Peele dropped out to form a comedy duo with Sarah Lawrence classmate and future Key & Peele writer Rebecca Drysdale.

== Career ==
Peele regularly performed at Boom Chicago, an English language improv troupe based in Amsterdam and The Second City in Chicago where he trained with Keegan-Michael Key.

=== 2002–2016: Television ===
In 2003, Peele joined the cast of Mad TV for its ninth season. Around the time Keegan-Michael Key joined the cast as a featured performer, it was assumed that Key would be chosen over Peele. The two of them ultimately were cast together after showing great comedic chemistry. Peele performed celebrity impersonations, which included favorites Ja Rule, Flavor Flav, Montel Williams, Morgan Freeman, Seal, Timbaland, will.i.am, and Forest Whitaker. Peele was absent from the first four episodes of his second season on Mad TV. He made a cameo in "Weird Al" Yankovic's video "White & Nerdy" with Mad TV co-star Keegan-Michael Key. After five seasons on Mad TV, Peele left the cast at the end of the 13th season.

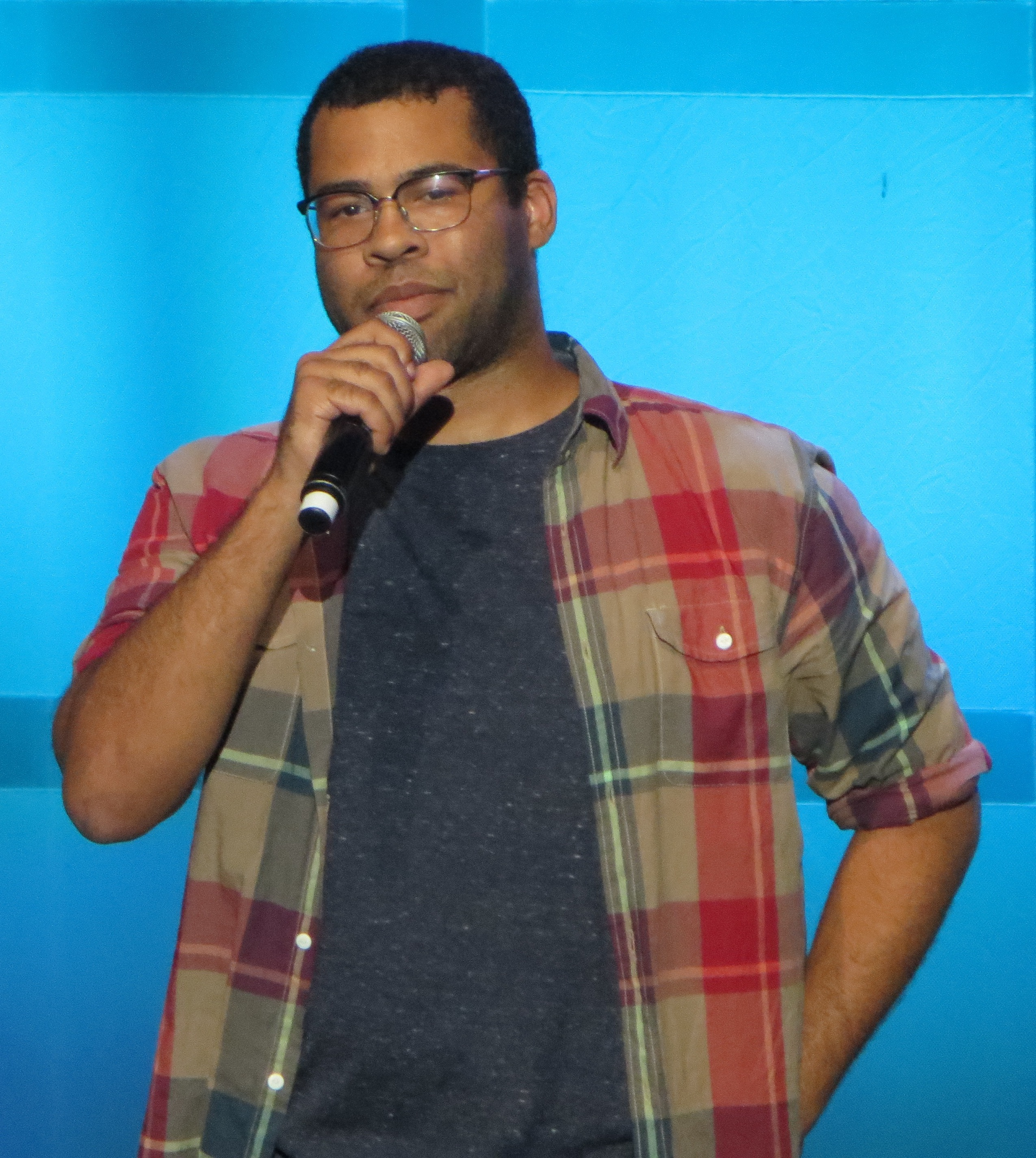
Peele performing in 2012

Peele was nominated for a 2008 Emmy Award for his song "Sad Fitty Cent", a music video parody about 50 Cent lamenting over his rivalry with Kanye West. The lyrics were, according to the music video, written by Peele, and he was involved in arranging its music. In 2009, he appeared in Little Fockers. He appeared in a viral video titled "Hillary vs Obama" (which was shown as a Mad TV sketch) where he and a Hillary Clinton supporter (played by short-term cast member Lisa Donovan) argue over whether Hillary Clinton or Barack Obama would make a better president, only to get upstaged by a Rudy Giuliani supporter (played by Donovan's brother, Ben). Peele auditioned to be a cast member for Saturday Night Live when SNL producers were looking for someone to play Barack Obama (around the time when SNL and Mad TV — and other scripted shows — were put on hiatus due to the 2007–2008 Writers Guild of America strike).

In 2010, Peele co-starred in the Fox comedy pilot The Station, and appeared with a recurring role in the Adult Swim series Childrens Hospital. He had a supporting role in the David Wain-directed comedy Wanderlust, which was released in 2012. Peele and his former Mad TV castmate and friend Keegan-Michael Key starred in their own Comedy Central sketch series Key & Peele, from 2012 to 2015. The series was a success with viewers, and spawned several skits and videos that went viral online.

In 2014, Peele played an FBI agent in the first season of the FX anthology series Fargo, inspired by the 1996 film of the same name.

In 2016, Peele starred in and produced, with Key, the first feature film in which the two both had leading roles, Keanu (they had previously both appeared in Wanderlust). The film received generally favorable reviews from critics.

=== 2017–present: filmmaking ===
In February 2017, Peele's first film, Get Out, was released to critical acclaim, eventually scoring a 98% rating on Rotten Tomatoes. The film received universal acclaim for Peele's screenplay and direction, as well as the performance of its lead, Daniel Kaluuya, and was chosen by the National Board of Review, the American Film Institute, and Time magazine as one of the top 10 films of the year. The Atlantic called the film "a subversive horror masterpiece". Get Out proved to be popular with audiences, and it eventually became one of the most profitable horror films, and films of 2017, and grossed over $255 million on a budget of $4.5 million. For his work on the film, Peele received significant attention, as well as numerous accolades, including the Bingham Ray Breakthrough Director Award at the 2017 Gotham Independent Film Awards. The film also received four nominations at the 90th Academy Awards: Best Picture, Best Director and Best Original Screenplay nominations for Peele, as well as a Best Actor nomination for Kaluuya. Peele won the Academy Award for Best Original Screenplay, becoming the first African American screenwriter to win in this category. He became the third person, after Warren Beatty and James L. Brooks, to be nominated for Best Picture, Best Director and Best Original Screenplay for a debut film, and the first black person to receive them for any one film. Get Out also earned him the Writers Guild of America Award for Best Original Screenplay, as well as nominations for a Directors Guild of America Award and a BAFTA Award for Best Original Screenplay. Notably, Get Out was also nominated for Best Picture in Comedy or Musical at the Golden Globes, something that sparked a bit of controversy surrounding the film and exactly what genre it fit into. The success prompted his Monkeypaw Productions company to a first look deal with Universal Pictures.

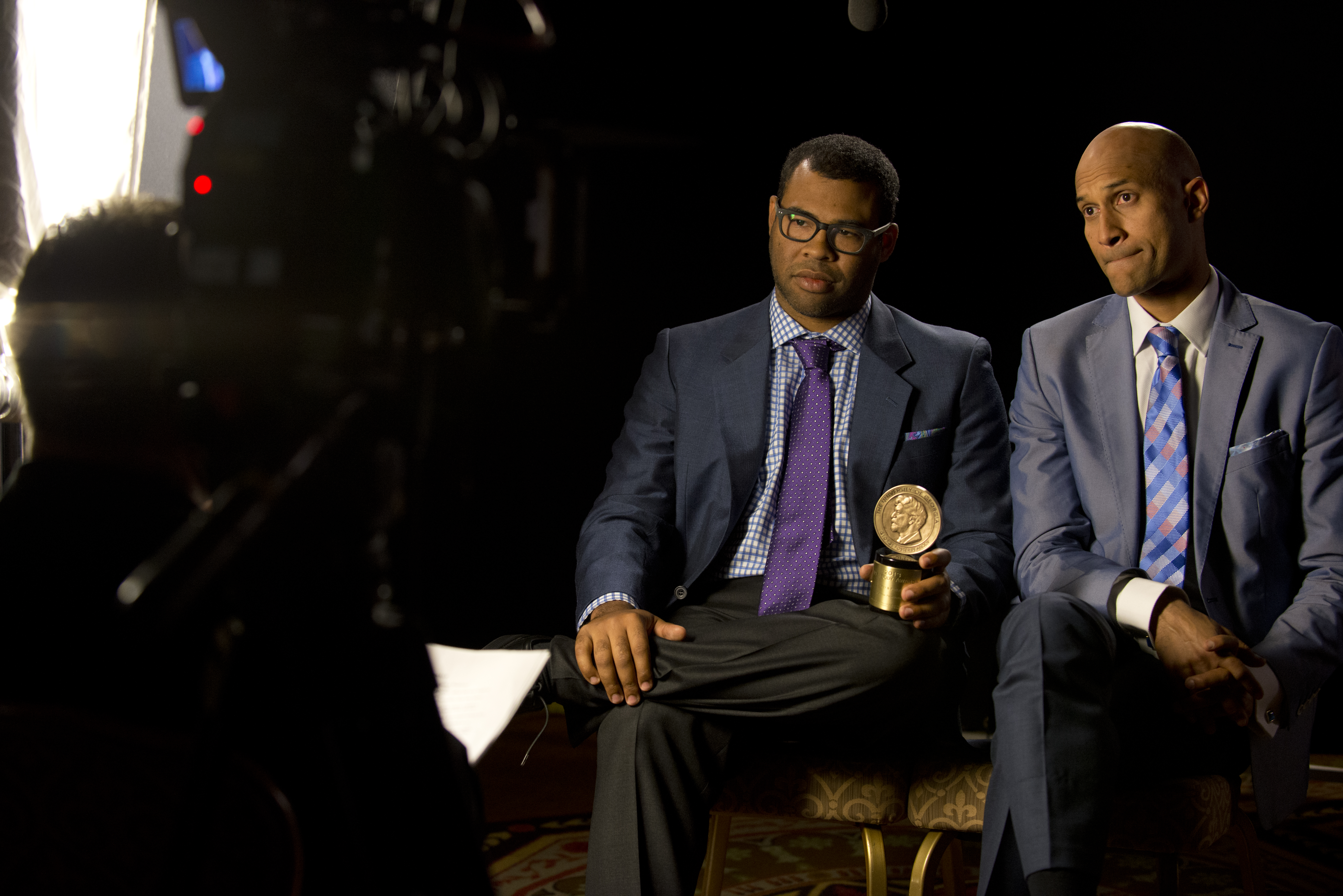
Jordan Peele and Keegan-Michael Key during the Peabody interview in 2014 for Key & Peele

In early 2018, Peele announced his intention to retire from acting, stating in an interview with CBS: "Acting is just nowhere near as fun for me as directing". In 2018, Peele co-created the TBS comedy series The Last O.G., starring Tracy Morgan and Tiffany Haddish. Also in 2018, Peele co-produced the Spike Lee film, BlacKkKlansman which was released to critical acclaim and was a box office success. The film received six nominations at the 91st Academy Awards including the Best Picture nomination for Peele. On June 28, 2018, it was announced that YouTube Premium would be releasing Weird City, co-created by Peele and Charlie Sanders. The show was released on February 13, 2019, to critical acclaim. On April 5, 2018, it was announced that Amazon Video had given a four-episode order for Lorena, a docuseries about Lorena Bobbitt. The series was set to be directed by Joshua Rofé who would also executive produce alongside Peele, Win Rosenfeld, Steven J. Berger, Jenna Santoianni, and Tom Lesinski. Production companies involved with the series include Monkeypaw Productions, Sonar Entertainment, and Number 19. It ultimately premiered on February 15, 2019.

Peele's second film as director was Us, a horror-thriller film which he also wrote and produced, starring Lupita Nyong'o, Winston Duke, Elisabeth Moss, and Tim Heidecker. After having its world premiere on March 8, the film was released in the United States on March 22, 2019, by Universal Pictures, Monkeypaw Productions, and QC Entertainment. Peele developed and is narrator for the science fiction web television series The Twilight Zone, the third revival of the original 1959–64 anthology series that aired on CBS, for CBS All Access. The show premiered on April 1, 2019, with Peele, Simon Kinberg and Marco Ramirez as executive producers. In February 2020, Peele produced a 10-episode series about hunting down Nazis called Hunters. Peele produced the HBO series Lovecraft Country written by Underground co-creator Misha Green.

Peele co-produced and co-wrote the 2021 sequel to Candyman, through his Monkeypaw Productions, of which Candyman star Tony Todd stated in a 2018 interview with Nightmare on Film Street: "I'd rather have him do it, someone with intelligence, who's going to be thoughtful and dig into the whole racial makeup of who Candyman is and why he existed in the first place". Universal and MGM collaborated with Win Rosenfeld to co-produce the film with Peele, and Nia DaCosta directed. The new Candyman serves as a "spiritual sequel", taking place back in the Chicago Cabrini Green housing projects, which subsequently underwent gentrification. After multiple delays, the film was theatrically released on August 27, 2021, to positive reviews.

Peele's third directorial feature, Nope, was released on July 22, 2022.

On November 3, 2015, it was reported that Henry Selick was developing Wendell & Wild, a new stop-motion feature with Jordan Peele and Keegan-Michael Key based on an original story by Selick. In March 2018, the film was picked up by Netflix. Wendell & Wild was released on Netflix in 2022.

==== Other projects ====
There have been several films floated based on Peele's sketch comedy series Key & Peele. In March 2015, it was announced that Key would reprise the role of Mr. Garvey in a feature-length film Substitute Teacher with Peele portraying a rival teacher. In March 2017, in a Reddit AMA, Peele expressed interest in developing a film around his Key & Peele character Wendell Sanders based on the music video "The Power of Wings". The film, titled Wendell Meets Middle-Earth, would follow Wendell's existence in the fantasy world that he likes to see his life in.

In October 2020, Rosenfeld and Peele signed on to produce the remake of Wes Craven's 1991 comedy horror film The People Under the Stairs. It was reported in September 2021 that his Monkeypaw Productions company had struck a deal with Universal Television. Peele approached Walt Disney Pictures with a proposal for a live-action remake of their cult favorite animated property, Gargoyles, but was declined.

At the Game Awards 2023, Peele announced his collaboration with video game designer Hideo Kojima on his next game, OD, an experimental horror title.

Peele's next directorial effort was set to be released on December 25, 2024, before being quietly pulled from Universal's release schedule following the impact of the 2023 Hollywood labor disputes. Universal later reinstated the film with a new release date of October 23, 2026, which would mark the longest gap between Peele's films to date. In September 2025, the movie was removed from Universal's release schedule again, with no new announced release date.

==== Influences ====
In February 2017, Peele curated the Brooklyn Academy of Music film series "The Art of the Social Thriller", comprising 12 films that inspired the making of Get Out, including the horror films Rosemary's Baby, Night of the Living Dead, The Shining, Candyman, The People Under the Stairs, Scream, The Silence of the Lambs, Funny Games, Misery, the thrillers Rear Window and The 'Burbs, and the comedy drama Guess Who's Coming to Dinner.

As a filmmaker, Peele has cited his influences as being Steven Spielberg, Alfred Hitchcock, Stanley Kubrick, David Fincher, John Carpenter, and M. Night Shyamalan.

As a comedian, Peele is influenced by the series In Living Color, which included a token white character, in contrast to the more common token black character. He also has listed comedians Richard Pryor, Steve Martin, and Martin Lawrence among his biggest influences.

== Activism ==
In October 2023, Peele signed an open letter calling for then-President Joe Biden to secure the release of hostages taken by Hamas during the Gaza war and the Artists4Ceasefire letter calling for a ceasefire in the war.

== Personal life ==
Through his mother, Lucinda Williams, Peele is descended from the colonial Woodhull family, whose members include Brigadier General Nathaniel Woodhull and Culper Ring Spy Abraham Woodhull (the latter of whom is his first cousin, eight times removed).

Peele began dating Chelsea Peretti in 2013. They became engaged in November 2015, and Peretti announced in April 2016 that she and Peele had eloped. They have a son (b. 2017).

== Filmography ==
Peele showcases many political issues through his main "Looking Trilogy" of work such as racism, politics and history. The three main pieces Peele produced, wrote and directed on his own account are Get Out, Nope, and Us, all grouped together now as a trilogy of work that through modern horror, allows Peele to address social issues. In 2017, Peele was included on the annual Time 100 list of the most influential people.

As filmmaker

Year	Title	Director	Writer	Producer	Distribution	Note
2016	Keanu	No	Yes	Yes	Warner Bros. Pictures	Also acted in a starring role
2017	Get Out	Yes	Yes	Yes	Universal Pictures	Also made a cameo (voice) appearance
2018	BlacKkKlansman	No	No	Yes	Focus Features	
2019	Us	Yes	Yes	Yes	Universal Pictures	Also made a cameo (voice) appearance
2021	Candyman	No	Yes	Yes	Universal Pictures	
2022	Nope	Yes	Yes	Yes	Universal Pictures	
2022	Wendell & Wild	No	Yes	Yes	Netflix	Also voiced a leading role
2024	Monkey Man	No	No	Yes	Universal Pictures	
2025	Him	No	No	Yes	Universal Pictures	

== Awards and nominations ==
Peele has been nominated for four Academy Awards: Best Picture, Best Director, and Best Original Screenplay for Get Out (2017), winning the latter, and another Best Picture nomination for BlacKkKlansman (2018). He has also been nominated for two British Academy Film Awards, two Golden Globe Awards, and won one Primetime Emmy Award.

== Bibliography ==
- Out There Screaming: An Anthology of New Black Horror (as editor, October 3, 2023)
