= Square Peg Media =

British publishing and event management company

Square Peg Media Ltd.
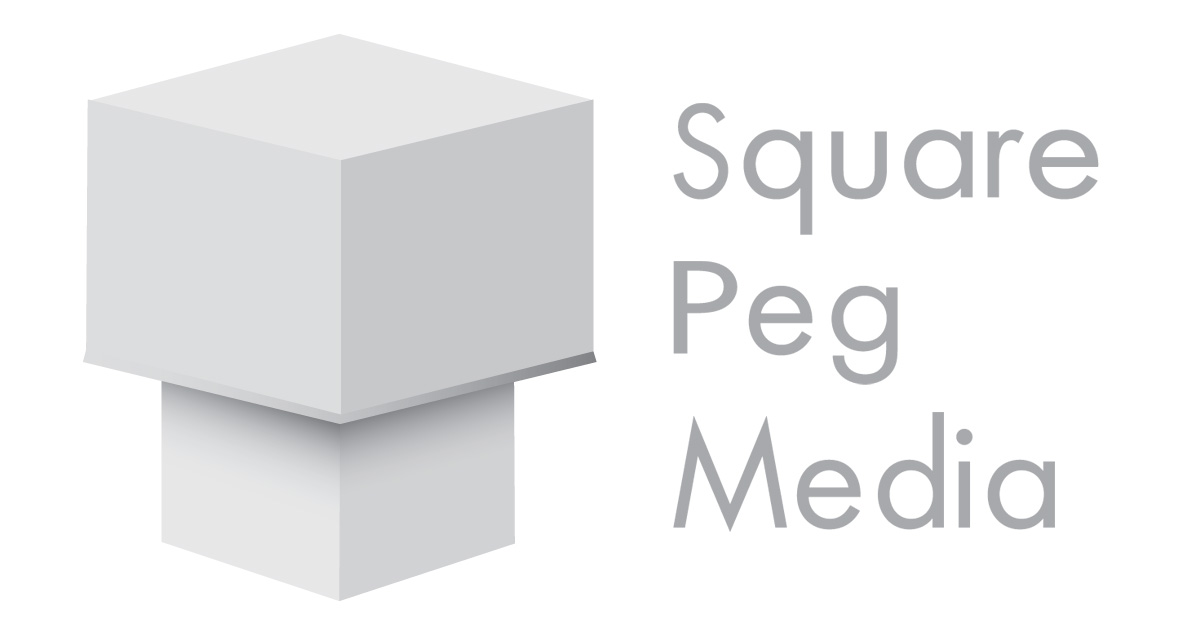
- Founded: 2005
- Founder: Linda Riley; Sarah Garrett
- Headquarters: London, NW1; United Kingdom
- Website: squarepegmedia.co.uk

Square Peg Media Ltd (SPM) is a publishing and event management company based in London, England, founded in 2005.

== History of ownership ==
The company was formed in 2005 by Linda Riley and her partner Sarah Garrett to take over the business of g3 magazine, a publication set up by Garrett and Lisa Knight in 2001. Originally a free title, g3 was a lifestyle and listings publication for lesbians and bisexual women, which became a paid-for publication available nationally through newsagents in 2012. Since acquiring this title, SPM has added annually to its publications, events, and brand extensions.

The company split its products in 2013, and Square Peg Media is now solely owned by Garrett.

== Publications and events ==
Under the new company structure, Square Peg Media started other publications and events focusing on diversity and inclusion:

- Out In The City, begun in 2007, is a gay men’s magazine, which, like g3, began as a free title and is now available nationally as a paid-for magazine.
- Diversity Careers Show, started in 2008 in London, is a diversity-specific careers event aimed at LGBT students, graduates and job-seekers nationwide to showcase the UK’s most inclusive recruiters.
- As a brand extension of the Diversity Careers Show, SPM published Out at Work (OAW) magazine in 2008, a free publication supported by Stonewall, the lesbian, gay and bisexual rights charity. The OAW magazine and website is a career workplace guide aimed nationally at gay school leavers, graduates and diversity professionals.
- Also in 2009, SPM launched the Alternative Parenting Show, sponsored by the London Women’s Clinic, which aims to showcase the various fertility services increasingly available to the LGBT community. Exhibitors include: surrogacy agencies; sperm banks; fertility clinics; adoption and fostering societies; plus law firms specialising in family law.
- In 2011, the company held the first European Diversity Awards (EDA), an independent awards ceremony originally sponsored by Google but joined by The Royal Bank of Scotland as co-headline sponsor in 2012. EDA recognises organisations and individuals that have shown innovation, creativity and commitment to equality, diversity and inclusion during the year and which recognises excellence and progress in the areas of gender, disability, sexual orientation, age, race, culture and religion across Europe. It is supported by a printed European Diversity Awards programme naming all nominees, categories, individual category sponsors and judges. Held at the Savoy Hotel in The Strand in London, the event is held annually. The 2013 event, held at London's Natural History Museum, was co-headline sponsored by Barclays and Google.
- Square Peg Media has also been publishers of the 48-page Proud magazine in 2009 and 2010, distributed free to all those attending gay pride celebrations in the capital.
- In 2012, Square Peg Media staged a one-day conference called Opportunities for Women, aimed at middle-management career women looking to move to executive positions in both the private and public sector. The event had female keynote speakers from business and industry and offered a series of seminars and workshops to attendees.
