= Louder, Please =

2025 studio album by Rose Gray

Studio album by Rose Gray
- Released: 17 January 2025
- Genre: Dance-pop
- Length: 41:26
- Label: PIAS
- Producers: Pat Alvarez; Zhone; Sur Back; Joe Brown; Alex Metric; Rob Milton; Sega Bodega; Ryland Blackinton; Vaughn Oliver; Sam Homaee; Frank Colucci; Shawn Wasabi

Rose Gray chronology
Higher Than the Sun (2023)	Louder, Please (2025)

Singles from Louder, Please
- 1. "Free" Released: 10 July 2024; 2. "Angel of Satisfaction" Released: 14 August 2024; 3. "Switch" Released: 18 September 2024; 4. "Wet & Wild" Released: 7 November 2024; 5. "Party People" Released: 31 December 2024

Louder, Please is the debut studio album by the English singer Rose Gray, released on 17 January 2025 through Play It Again Sam. She co-wrote the album with a variety of collaborators and producers, including Alex Metric, Sega Bodega, Ryland Blackinton, Vaughn Oliver, and Shawn Wasabi. The album was preceded by the release of five singles between July and December 2024: "Free", "Angel of Satisfaction", "Switch", "Wet & Wild", and "Party People".

== Background and production ==
Louder, Please was written over the course of two years before being produced, mixed, and mastered in the following six months.

== Release and promotion ==
The lead single from the album, titled "Free", was released on 10 July 2024. It was followed by "Angel of Satisfaction" on 14 August. On 18 September, Gray announced the album's title, Louder, Please, and uploaded its third single "Switch". A fourth single was titled "Wet & Wild" and released on 7 November. "Party People" was released as the fifth and final single from the album on 31 December 2024. NME included Louder, Please on its list of the most anticipated releases of 2025. PIAS Recordings released the album on 17 January 2025.

A deluxe edition of the album, titled A Little Louder, Please, was released on 24 October 2025. Alongside her announcement for the deluxe edition, she released the single "April". As well as two other new songs, the edition featured collaborations with Melanie C, Jade, Shygirl and Casey MQ. A Little Louder, Please also included remixes and club edits of songs from the album.

== Critical reception ==
Professional ratings
Aggregate scores
Source	Rating
AnyDecentMusic?	7.2/10
Metacritic	77/100
Review scores
Source	Rating
Clash	7/10
Dork	4/5 stars
The Guardian	4/5 stars
NME	4/5 stars
Pitchfork	6.7/10

Louder, Please received generally positive reviews from music critics. On the review aggregator site Metacritic, which assigns a normalized score out of 100 to ratings from publications, Louder, Please holds a weighted mean of 77 based on 5 critics' reviews, indicating "generally favourable reviews". AnyDecentMusic? gave the album a score of 7.2 out of 10, based on their assessment of the critical consensus from 7 reviews.

In a review for Dork, Martyn Young wrote that the album "is a sonic journey for head, body and soul to soundtrack all your partying needs for 2025". Michael Cragg of The Guardian believed that hedonism is the main theme on the album and praised the "dance-pop anthems that pierce the heart". Rolling Stone UK included the album on a list of the best releases of the week; its staff said that Gray "cements her place as one of dance music's most exciting new voices", and that the album "could be one of the year's defining dance records". Sydney Brasil of Exclaim! wrote that Gray brings her "own flair to the dance floor" and perceived elements of jungle and house music. NME's Rishi Shah praised the hooks and melodies, and said that the genres of Gray's previous EPs, house and rave-pop, "pierce even deeper into the underground" on Louder, Please. Aimee Philips of Clash finished her review saying that the album "captures the spirit of the dance floor with unflinching authenticity", although it "doesn't reinvent the wheel".

=== Year-end lists ===
Year-end lists
Publication	List	Rank	Ref.
Coup de Main	The Best Albums of 2025	10	
Dork	Albums of the Year 2025	11	
Elle	The Best Albums of 2025	—N/a	
The Forty-Five	The 45 Best Albums of 2025	15	
NME	50 Best Albums of 2025	47	
Vogue	The 45 Best Albums of 2025	—N/a	

== Track listing ==
Credits adapted from Tidal.

Louder, Please track listing
No.	Title	Writer(s)	Producer(s)	Length
1.	"Damn"	Rose Gray; Caitlin Stubbs; Pat Alvarez	Alvarez	2:25
2.	"Free"	Gray; Ella Boh; Kevin Hickey	Zhone	3:11
3.	"Wet & Wild"	Gray; Sur Back	Back	3:02
4.	"Just Two"	Gray; DRIIA; Joe Brown; Alvarez; Sur Back; Uffie	Brown; Alvarez	3:22
5.	"Tectonic"	Gray; Alex Metric	Metric; Rob Milton	3:16
6.	"Party People"	Gray; Sega Bodega; Back	Bodega	3:14
7.	"Angel of Satisfaction"	Gray; Justin Tranter; Ryland Blackinton; Vaughn Oliver	Blackinton; Oliver	3:31
8.	"Switch"	Gray; Tranter; Sam Homaee	Homaee	3:00
9.	"Hackney Wick"	Gray; Alvarez; Back	Alvarez	3:50
10.	"First"	Gray; Frank Colucci; Brown; Max Wolfgang	Colucci; Brown; Alvarez	3:08
11.	"Everything Changes (But I Won't)"	Gray; Tranter; Shawn Serrano	Shawn Wasabi	3:51
12.	"Louder, Please"	Gray; Micah; Alvarez; Phil Scully; Back	Back	5:30
Total length:				41:26

A Little Louder, Please (Deluxe): Disc 1 track listing
No.	Title	Writer(s)	Producer(s)	Length
13.	"April"	Alex Drury; Gray	Metric	3:15
14.	"Lotus"	Drury; Gray; Twin Lee	Metric; Lee	3:34

A Little Louder, Please (Deluxe): Disc 2 track listing
No.	Title	Writer(s)	Producer(s)	Length
1.	"Damn" (club edit)	Stubbs; Alvarez; Gray	Alvarez	4:24
2.	"Free" (Fifi remix)	Boh; Hickey; Gray	Zhone; Daiana Azar; Fifi Poulakidas; Juan Armani	3:09
3.	"Wet & Wild" (Alex Chapman remix)	Caroline Leigh Sans; Gray	Black; Alex Chapman	2:52
4.	"Just Two" (Clementaum's Abrisa remix)	DRIIA; Brown; Alvarez; Gray	Brown; Alvarez; Clementaum	4:15
5.	"Tectonic" (strings version)	Metric; Gray	Metric; Milton	3:13
6.	"Party People" (Karl F Rivas remix)	Sans; Gray; Bodega	Bodega; Karl F Rivas	4:13
7.	"Angel of Satisfaction" (featuring Jade)	Tranter; Gray; Blackinton; Oliver; Jade	Blackinton; Oliver	3:31
8.	"Switch" (Logic1000 remix)	Tranter; Gray; Homaee	Homaee; Logic1000	3:39
9.	"Hackney Wick" (strings version)	Sans; Alvarez; Gray	Alvarez; Luxe	4:04
10.	"First" (with Melanie C)	Colucci; Brown; Wolfgang	Colucci; Brown; Alvarez; Sur Back	3:22
11.	"Everything Changes (But I Won't)" (featuring Shygirl and Casey MQ)	Blaine Muise; Casey Manierka-Quaile; Tranter; Gray; Serrano	Wasabi	3:55
12.	"Louder, Please" (Peach remix)	Sans; Alvarez; Gray	Back; Peach	3:44
13.	"I Don't Speak French"	Tranter; Gray; Blackinton; Oliver	Blackinton; Oliver	2:58

== Personnel ==
The credits shown below are adapted from Apple Music.

- Rose Gray – vocals
- Pat Alvarez – keyboards (1, 9), mixing engineer (1, 9, 10), recording engineer (1)
- Dan Grech-Marguerat – mixing engineer (2, 8)
- Chris Allen – mixing engineer (3, 7)
- Joe Brown – keyboards, recording engineer (4)
- Alex Metric – keyboards, recording engineer (5)
- Rob Milton – keyboards, recording engineer (5)
- Ewan Pearson Summer – mixing engineer (5)
- Sega Bodega – keyboards (6)
- Vaughn Oliver – keyboards, recording engineer (7)
- Ryland Blackinton – keyboards, recording engineer (7)
- Shawn Wasabi – keyboards (11)

== Charts ==
Chart performance for Louder, Please
Chart (2025)	Peak position
Scottish Albums (Official Charts)	50
UK Albums Sales (Official Charts)	37
UK Independent Albums (Official Charts)	17
