= Shawn Wasabi =

Filipino-American musician

- Also known as: Wasabi
- Born: Shawn Michael Serrano; Salinas, California, U.S.
- Genres: Pop
- Occupation: Record producer
- Instrument: Midi Fighter 64
- Years active: 2013–present
- Website: www.shawnwasabi.com

Shawn Michael Serrano (born May 26, 1994), professionally known as Shawn Wasabi, is an American artist, composer, and record producer from Salinas, California. He is credited as a co-inventor of the Midi Fighter 64, a custom musical software controller. Shawn has accumulated hundreds of millions of views on his original Youtube works. He resides in Los Angeles.

== Biography ==
Shawn Wasabi was born in Salinas, California. He was born to Filipino parents, with his father from Manila, and his mother from Cebu. At a young age, he learned piano.

In 2013, Shawn Wasabi started producing music after his friend left the Midi Fighter 3D at his house. Since then, he has uploaded his live mashups, which have all garnered millions of views on YouTube.

In 2015, he released "Marble Soda", using a Midi Fighter 64. It contains samples from 153 different tracks and sounds. The video for the song reached 1 million views on YouTube within 48 hours of being uploaded.

In 2016, he was nominated for the Breakthrough Artist award at the 6th Streamy Awards.

In 2017, he released "Spicy Boyfriend". In that year, he also released "Otter Pop", which featured guest vocalist Hollis. The Fader placed it at number 27 on the "101 Best Songs of 2017" list.

In 2018, he released "Squeez", which featured guest vocalist Raychel Jay. The song was included on Paper's "10 Songs You Need to Start Your Weekend Right" list, as well as The Fader's "20 Best New Pop Songs Right Now" list.

His debut studio album, Mangotale, was released in 2020.

Shawn Wasabi also produces music for other artists. His production credits include songs with Cynthia Erivo, eaJ, JIHYO (of TWICE), Kid Cudi, The Rose, Rose Gray, Royal & the Serpent, Saweetie, and many more. He achieved his first top 40 production with KATSEYE's "Internet Girl" debuting at #29 on the Billboard Top 100.

== Midi Fighter 64 ==
One of Shawn Wasabi's equipment is the DJ TechTools Midi Fighter 64, a custom 64-button MIDI controller. The Midi Fighter line of controllers is notable for using Japanese Sanwa arcade buttons rather than the rubber pads traditionally used on MPC-style MIDI controllers. Initially, the Midi Fighter only came in 16-button variations. A prototype of a 64-button version was designed and 3D printed for him to use by DJ TechTools product designer Michael Mitchell. In 2016, his original Midi Fighter 64 prototype, along with his computer and hard drive, was stolen in a car burglary. This eventually led to the mass production of the Midi Fighter 64 in 2017.

== Discography ==
=== Studio albums ===
- Mangotale (2020)

=== Singles ===
- "Hotto Dogu" (2014)
- "Marble Soda" (2015)
- "Burnt Rice" (2015) (with YDG, featuring Yung Gemmy)
- "Spicy Boyfriend" (2017)
- "Otter Pop" (2017) (featuring Hollis)
- "Squeez" (2018) (featuring Raychel Jay)
- "Mango Love" (2018) (featuring Satica)
- "Marble Tea" (2019) (featuring uncredited vocals from Raychel Jay)
- "Snack" (2019) (featuring Raychel Jay)
- "Home Run" (2020) (featuring Raychel Jay)
- "Animal Crossing" (2020) (featuring Sophia Black)
- "Lemons" (2020) (featuring Kennedi)
- "I Dip" (2021) (featuring uncredited vocals from Chloe George)
- "Trigger Warning" (2023) (featuring Wolftyla and MIYACHI)

=== Producer Credits ===
- "Clear (Shawn Wasabi Remix)" (2016) - Pusher, MOTHICA
- "How You Feeling?" (2017) - Superfruit
- "Big Bag" (2018) - Wes Period
- "Wutda Hell" (2018) - Wes Period
- "WASHED" (2018) - Dumbfounded
- "Cool Being You" (2018) - Neptune
- "Yamaguchi" (2019) - Terror Jr
- "Talk About It" (2019) - Plasty
- "Don't Shoot" (2019) - Shea Diamond
- "The Grandpa Rap" (2019) - Kyle Exum
- "The Family Rap" (2019) - Kyle Exum
- "I'd Kill" (2019) - Chloe Tang
- "Call Me Queen" (2019) - Citizen Queen
- "Skin Care Tutorial 2020" (2020) - tobi lou
- "Final Fantasy" (2020) - ALMA
- "Mama" (2020) - ALMA
- "Nightmare" (2020) - ALMA
- "So Lucky" (2020) - Shea Diamond
- "Strawberry Lemonade" (2021) - Neptune
- "This Song Is About Self Love" (2021) - DANakaDAN
- "Shiny Demise" (2022) - Neptune
- "People Can Change" (2022) - YDE
- "Where's the Fun in Truth" (2022) - YDE
- "Uncomfortable" (2022) - YDE
- "Wyoming" (2022) - Neptune
- "LA Stars" (2023) - eaJ
- "Wishing On You" (2023) - JIHYO
- "Nauseous" (2023) - The Rose
- "Moonlit Sonata" (2023) - DANDAN
- "NaNi" (2024) - Saweetie
- "Datin' Myself" (2024) - UNIS
- "Read the Room" (2024) - Elijah Blake, Kareen Lomax
- "Psycho and Beautiful" (2024) - CLASS:y
- "Wasteland (from the series "Arcane League of Legends)" (2024) - Arcane, Royal & the Serpent
- "Everything Changes (But I Won't)" (2024) - Rose Gray
- "Replay" (2024) - Cynthia Erivo
- "Grave" (2025) - Kid Cudi
- "Truman Show" (2025) - Kid Cudi
- "Neverland" (2025) - Kid Cudi
- "Picnic In Paris" (2025) - Kid Cudi
- "Submarine" (2025) - Kid Cudi
- "Mr. Miracle" (2025) - Kid Cudi
- "Internet Girl" (2026) - KATSEYE

=== Guest Appearances ===
- Far East Movement - "Glue" (2019) (featuring Heize and Shawn Wasabi)

Notes

- Mangotale is stylized in all caps.
- "Squeez" is stylized with a registered trademark symbol after the title.
- "Marble Tea," "Home Run," "Animal Crossing," and "Lemons" are stylized in all caps.
- "Snack" is stylized in all caps, and the title was later changed to "The Snack That Smiles Back" on streaming platforms (stylized in lowercase).
- "I Dip" is stylized in lowercase.
