= Him (2025 film) =

2025 film by Justin Tipping

- Theatrical release poster
- Directed by: Justin Tipping
- Written by: Skip Bronkie; Zack Akers; Justin Tipping
- Produced by: Jordan Peele; Win Rosenfeld; Ian Cooper; Jamal Watson
- Starring: Marlon Wayans; Tyriq Withers; Julia Fox; Tim Heidecker; Jim Jefferies
- Cinematography: Kira Kelly
- Edited by: Taylor Joy Mason
- Music by: Bobby Krlic
- Production company: Monkeypaw Productions
- Distributed by: Universal Pictures
- Release date: September 19, 2025 (United States)
- Running time: 96 minutes
- Country: United States
- Language: English
- Budget: $27 million
- Box office: $28 million

Him is a 2025 American sports-supernatural horror film co-written and directed by Justin Tipping. The film stars Marlon Wayans, Tyriq Withers, Julia Fox, Tim Heidecker, and Jim Jefferies. Its plot follows a young up-and-coming football player (Withers) training at the isolated compound of an aging, nearly retired quarterback (Wayans).

Him was released in the United States on September 19, 2025, by Universal Pictures. It received generally negative reviews from critics and was a box office bomb, having only grossed $28 million against a budget of $27 million.

== Plot ==
Young Cameron "Cam" Cade watches his favorite football team, the San Antonio Saviors, win the league championship. His joy turns to distress when his quarterback idol, Isaiah White, suffers a violent, possibly career-ending injury while scoring the winning touchdown. Cam's father tells him that real men are willing to make such sacrifices. Years later, Cam's father has died, and Cam is now a rising football star. Encouraged by his family and girlfriend Jasmine, he trains for the league combine. While practicing late on an empty field, Cam is ambushed and assaulted by an unidentified figure in a goat costume, causing a head injury that endangers his career.

Motivated by his agent, Tom, Cam plans to attend the combine to pursue the Saviors' quarterback position, despite the risk of permanent brain damage if he sustains another injury. While overstimulated due to his concussion, Cam lashes out at his brother Drew and Tom, ultimately refusing to participate in the combine. Tom later reveals that Isaiah is considering retirement and has offered to train Cam for a week at a remote desert compound to prove himself a worthy successor. Cam accepts and travels there, encountering crazed Isaiah fans led by Marjorie, who try to intimidate him out of replacing their hero.

At the compound, Isaiah puts Cam through disturbing challenges, including a practice drill where a jugs machine repeatedly hits a player in the face and another drill where Cam severely headbutts another player. Cam secretly receives shots of Isaiah's blood, which he is led to believe is an energy booster, and experiences frequent hallucinations of masked figures, which he attributes to the concussion. While in a sauna, Cam is attacked by Marjorie and overpowers her. Isaiah arrives and kills her, leaving Cam unsettled by his apparent lack of remorse for doing so. As Cam tries to leave, Isaiah's wife, Elsie, apologizes for Isaiah's behavior and seduces Cam. Cam wakes the next morning to Isaiah holding him at gunpoint, demanding to know if Cam and Elsie slept together. Isaiah ridicules Cam for feeling guilty about cheating on Jasmine, saying winners are remorseless.

Elsie invites Cam to a secret party to meet the owners of the Saviors. When Cam arrives, Marco, the team doctor, whispers to him to "run" before leaving. The owners offer Cam a strange red liquid, which he drinks, unaware that it is Isaiah's blood. A disoriented Cam finds Marco's severed head in a plastic-lined room. Elsie comforts him as he loses consciousness. Cam later wakes up in an ice bath at Isaiah's compound, connected to an IV of Isaiah's blood. He rips out the IV, injects a serum given by Marco, and grabs a jagged trophy, aiming to kill Isaiah and escape. Cam finds Isaiah watching a video of cheering fans. Isaiah reveals he is part of a line of manufactured "Greatest of All Time" (G.O.A.T.) players who gain enhanced abilities from ritual blood transferred down a lineage. Isaiah tells Cam they must fight to the death with one G.O.A.T. transfusion victor. After a struggle, Cam bludgeons Isaiah to death with a helmet.

Cam leaves the room and steps onto a football field, where he finds Elsie, the Saviors' owners, and Tom, all wearing animal masks. They present him with a contract to sign, revealing that Cam's father arranged for him to be the next G.O.A.T. They explain that the earlier masked attack was orchestrated to lead Cam to the Saviors as no one else would want to draft him. Cam refuses to sign the contract. After an owner threatens to kill his family for refusing to sign, Cam snaps and kills the masked attacker — who is revealed to be Isaiah and Cam's trainer, Malek — using a warhammer. An enraged Elsie attempts to attack Cam, but she dies accidentally stabbing herself in the neck, while he kills all the owners with a sword. However, he spares Tom, who is dragged into a pentagram and destroyed by an unseen force. Outside the compound, a bloodied Cam walks past masked cheerleaders and into the desert.

=== Alternate endings ===
There are two alternate endings to the film:

==== Alternate ending #1 ====
The first alternate ending revealed that Isaiah survived his beating. He watches on TV as Cam is shown to have won the Super Bowl for the Saviors, revealing that Cam signed the contract.

==== Alternate ending #2 ====
The second alternate ending reveals that Cam joined another football team and managed to win the championship with them, seemingly without the help of any rituals or other outside demonic forces. The film ends with Cam staring at a spinning football, hinting that despite not selling his soul, the unknown entities are still following him.

== Cast ==
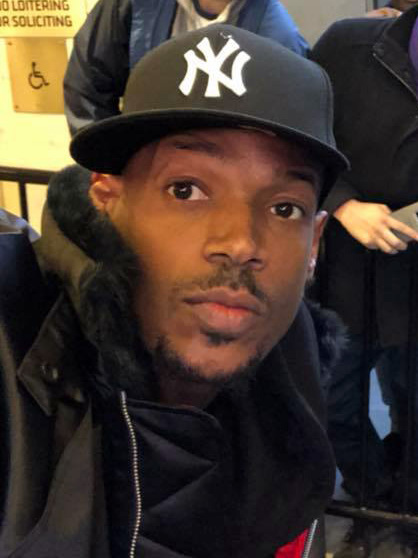
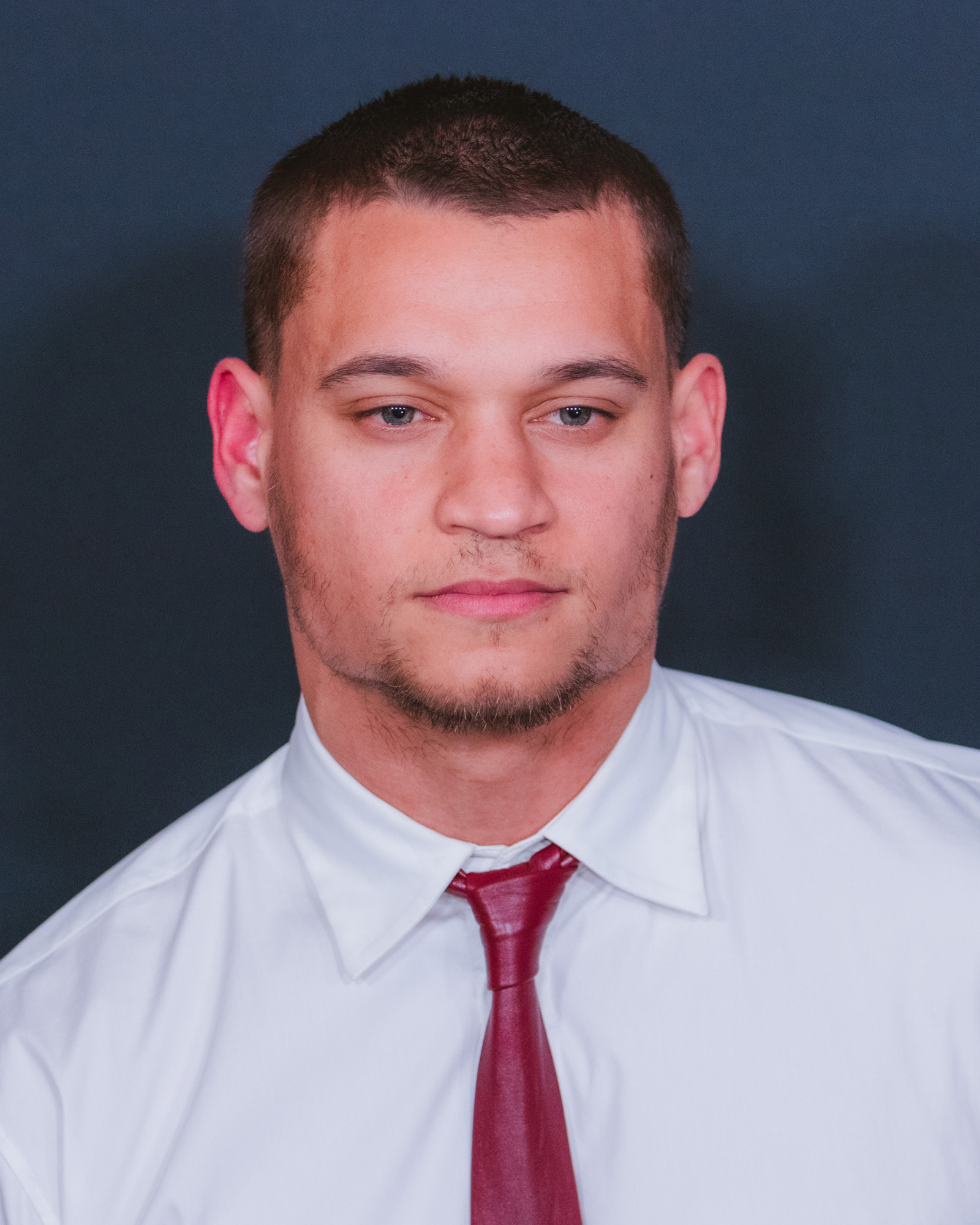
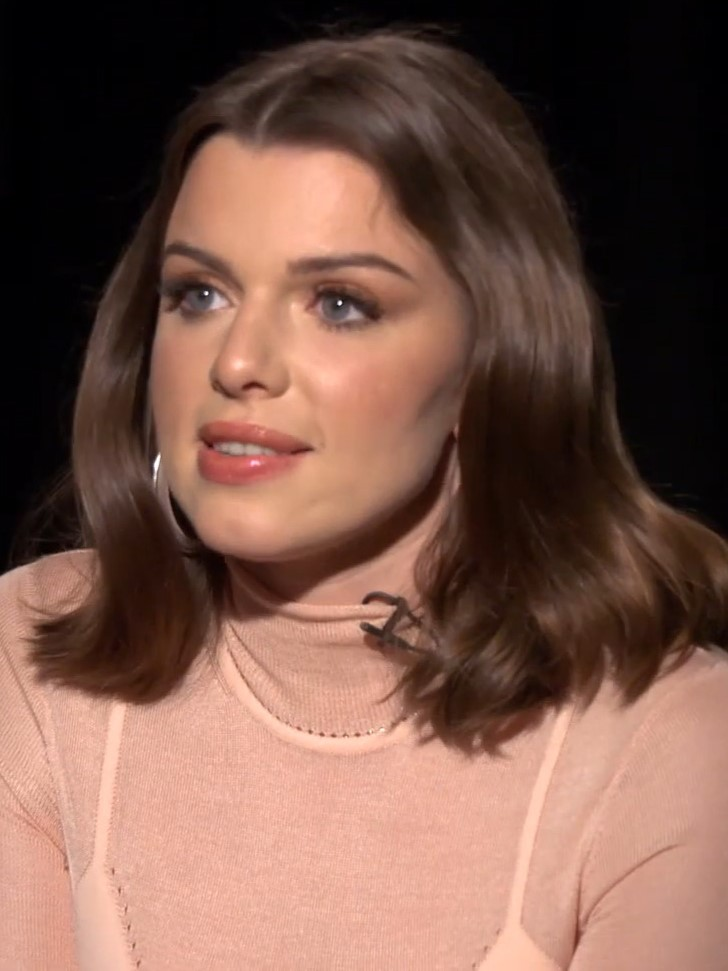
The film stars Marlon Wayans, Tyriq Withers, and Julia Fox.
- Marlon Wayans as Isaiah White, a quarterback for the San Antonio Saviors
- Tyriq Withers as Cameron "Cam" Cade, a young football player who is mentored by Isaiah
  - Austin Pulliam as Young Cam
- Julia Fox as Elsie White, a social media influencer and Isaiah's wife
- Tim Heidecker as Tom, Cam's manager
- Jim Jefferies as Marco, Isaiah's personal doctor
- Maurice Greene as Malek, a trainer and a horned fanatic
- Indira G. Wilson as Yvette, Cam's mother
- Gerone McKinley as Drew, Cam's brother
- Heather Lynn Harris as Jasmine, Cam's high school sweetheart
- Don Benjamin as Cam Sr., Cam's father
- Guapdad 4000 as Murph, Cam's cousin
- Richard Lippert as the owner of the Saviors
- Naomi Grossman as Marjorie, a crazed fan of Isaiah White
- Tierra Whack as Adrienne
- Chase Garland as Ced, a free agent
- Norman Towns as Willis, a free agent
- GiGi Erneta as Ayn

== Production ==
=== Development ===
Zack Akers and Skip Bronkie wrote a spec script initially titled Goat—in reference to the sports term "greatest of all time" (GOAT)—and took it out for sale with WME in April 2022. In June 2022, Monkeypaw Productions, in a deal with Universal Pictures, bought the script. At the end of the year, the script was voted onto the Black List of best unproduced screenplays in 2022. In January 2024, Justin Tipping was announced as the director with Marlon Wayans starring, and later Tyriq Withers joined the cast. In February, Julia Fox joined the cast. The film was retitled Him with the setting of its release date in September 2025.

=== Filming ===
Principal photography was completed by November 2024. The production budget had a net cost of $27 million. It was filmed on location in and around Albuquerque, New Mexico. Spaceport America was used as an exterior location.

== Music ==
Bobby Krlic had composed the score for the film by April 2025. The film's soundtrack was released on September 19, 2025. On September 4, 2025, "Swim" by Guapdad 4000 and Mavi, and "Tip Toe" by Tierra Whack were released as singles from the soundtrack. "Blitz" was released by Jean Dawson as the soundtrack's third single on September 10, 2025. The soundtrack's fourth single, "Him" by Denzel Curry, was released on September 18, 2025. The soundtrack released on September 19, 2025, alongside the film.

== Release ==
Him was first released in Mexico on September 18, 2025, and was theatrically released on September 19, 2025, by Universal Pictures.

=== Home media ===
The film was released on VOD on October 7, 2025, and was also released on DVD, Blu-ray and Ultra HD Blu-Ray on November 11, 2025.

== Reception ==
=== Box office ===
Him grossed $25 million in the United States and Canada, and $3 million in other territories, for a worldwide total of $28 million.

In the United States and Canada, Him was released alongside A Big Bold Beautiful Journey, and was projected to gross $15–18 million from 3,100 theaters in its opening weekend. The film made $6.5 million on its first day, including $2 million from Thursday night previews. It went on to debut to $13.5 million, finishing second behind holdover Demon Slayer.

=== Critical response ===
On the review aggregator website Rotten Tomatoes, 30% of 230 critics' reviews are positive, with an average rating of 4.6/10. The website's consensus reads: "Fumbling the ball well before the red zone, Him has style to spare but botches its promising concept with rookie execution." Metacritic, which uses a weighted average, assigned the film a score of 38 out of 100, based on 35 critics, indicating "generally unfavorable" reviews. Audiences polled by CinemaScore gave the film an average grade of "C−" on an A+ to F scale.

Peter Debruge of Variety gave the film a positive review and wrote, "Amid the thrills, Him gets you thinking about the sport and all that it demands, potentially making monsters of our heroes in the process. But as the saying goes: Don't hate the player, hate the game." Frank Scheck of The Hollywood Reporter, gave a mixed review and wrote, "The performers give it their all, with Withers impressively handling the intense physicality of his role and Wayans effectively intimidating as the football legend whose prowess isn’t purely natural... But by the time it gets to the truly baroque, extremely gory final act that will leave audience members either hooting in delight or shaking their heads in derision, Him has long since gone off the rails."

IndieWire's David Ehrlich gave the film a C−, stating, "Him knows that it's silly as hell, but it has no idea how to balance that against the ostensible seriousness of its social critique, which is how you wind up with leaden dialogue sandwiched between moments of broad satire." On Marlon Wayans' performance: "Wayans is always exceptional as a dramatic actor, and the shark-eyed intensity he brings to this movie is the only thing that holds it together."

In a negative review for RogerEbert.com, Robert Daniels gave the film a 0.5 out of 4 rating, and wrote, "HIM wants to deliver psychic shocks, but the film doesn't know what approach to take. The demonic scenes that seem to be inside Cam's head—a glittering mascot wielding a sledgehammer often lurks in the shadows—oscillate between being internalized and externalized with no real logic backing up the switches. We see medicines injected by Isaiah's personal trainer that are meant to increase Cam's performance, but the body horror of watching the needle pierce Cam's skin falls flat because we don't know what's in the vials or their actual effect. The film, for good measure, even tries to insert a Jesus motif whose religious importance is ham-fisted, rushed, and not all that original."

Speaking about the negative reviews, Marlon Wayans said: "I respect critics. Their job is to critique. I respect their work. It shapes our industry. But an opinion does not always mean it's everyone's opinion. Some movies are ahead of the curve. Innovation is not always embraced and art is to be interpreted and it's subjective. I've had a career of making classic movies that weren't critically received [sic] and those movies went on to be classics. So don't take anyone's opinion just go see for yourself."
