= Monkey Man (film) =

2024 film by Dev Patel

- Theatrical release poster
- Directed by: Dev Patel
- Screenplay by: Dev Patel; Paul Angunawela; John Collee
- Story by: Dev Patel
- Produced by: Dev Patel; Jomon Thomas; Jordan Peele; Win Rosenfeld; Ian Cooper; Basil Iwanyk; Erica Lee; Christine Haebler; Sam Sahini; Anjay Nagpal; Abhinath Maurya
- Starring: Dev Patel; Sharlto Copley; Pitobash; Vipin Sharma
- Cinematography: Sharone Meir
- Edited by: Dávid Jancsó; Tim Murrell; Joe Galdo
- Music by: Jed Kurzel
- Production companies: Universal Pictures; Bron Studios; Thunder Road Films; Minor Realm; Monkeypaw Productions; S'YA Concept; WME Independent; Creative Wealth Media
- Distributed by: Universal Pictures
- Release dates: March 11, 2024 (SXSW); April 5, 2024 (United States and Canada)
- Running time: 121 minutes
- Countries: Canada; United States
- Languages: English; Hindi
- Budget: $10 million
- Box office: $35 million

Monkey Man is a 2024 action thriller film directed and produced by Dev Patel in his directorial debut, who also co-wrote the screenplay with Paul Angunawela and John Collee. The film stars Patel as Kid, a man who seeks vengeance on the corrupt leaders responsible for his mother's death. Sharlto Copley, Pitobash, and Vipin Sharma are featured in supporting roles.

Monkey Man premiered at South by Southwest on March 11, 2024, and was released theatrically in the United States and Canada by Universal Pictures on April 5, 2024. The film received positive reviews and grossed $35 million worldwide against a $10 million budget. It was nominated at the 78th BAFTA Awards for Outstanding Debut by a British Writer, Director or Producer.

== Plot ==
In a forest village in India, Kid lives with his mother Neela and is inspired by her tales of Hanuman. Baba Shakti, a spiritual guru in the nearby city of Yatana, sends corrupt police chief Rana Singh to evict the villagers, who are members of a persecuted religious minority, and acquire their land. The village is massacred, but Neela hides Kid before she is killed by Rana, who sets her body on fire. Kid's futile attempts to save Neela leave his hands burned and scarred.

Years later, an older Kid works as a heel and jobber at the underground fight club Tiger's Temple, wearing a monkey mask. Kid is determined to exact revenge on Rana, who frequents Kings, a luxury brothel and cocaine den disguised as a social club. Kid infiltrates Kings through an elaborate ruse to meet the manager and pimp Queenie Kapoor and persuades her to give him a job as a menial kitchen worker. Kid befriends Alphonso, a gangster working for Queenie, and Sita, one of the exploited prostitutes. Kid rigs a bout at Tiger's Temple in Alphonso's favor to make him money in exchange for a promotion to waiter; Kid plans to use his new role to get closer to Rana to exact his revenge.

Kid buys a revolver and trains a stray dog to carry it to a rear door to avoid security at the entrance of Kings. Kid serves Rana cocaine spiked with powdered bleach to drive him to the restroom, where he can be shot privately. The assassination attempt is botched, and Kid is forced to fight his way out of the building. He flees in Alphonso's supercharged auto rickshaw and is chased by the police. Kid crashes the rickshaw and is arrested. Kid manages to break out of police custody, but is shot by a police sniper during his escape. He falls into a canal and is rescued by Alpha, the keeper of a local temple devoted to Ardhanarishvara. The temple is a sanctuary for Yatana's hijra community, which is being targeted by Baba's nationalist and ultraconservative movement.

Kid recovers at the temple after learning that he is now a wanted fugitive. Alpha guides him through a hallucinogenic experience in which he confronts the trauma of his mother's death. With a newfound sense of purpose, Kid trains in combat to fight for himself and the marginalized. When the hijra's sanctuary is threatened, Kid fights again at Tiger's Temple, placing a bet on himself. He purposely defeats two faces and emerges victorious with enough money to save Alpha's temple.

During Diwali, Baba's candidate gets elected and their nationalist party celebrates at Kings. Kid bleaches his monkey mask white and fights his way inside with improvised weapons, joined by Alpha and her warriors. Queenie attempts to shoot Kid but is killed by Sita. Kid beats Rana mercilessly in a fistfight, killing him. He uses Queenie's severed thumb to access the penthouse and reach Baba, who stabs him with blades hidden in his padukas. Kid kills Baba using the same blades against him. Having finally avenged his mother's death, Kid collapses from his injuries, reminiscing about Neela and his devotion to Hanuman.

== Cast ==
- Dev Patel as Kid
  - Jatin Malik as Young Kid
- Pitobash as Alphonso
- Sikandar Kher as Rana Singh
- Sobhita Dhulipala as Sita
- Makarand Deshpande as Baba Shakti
- Ashwini Kalsekar as Queenie Kapoor
- Vipin Sharma as Alpha
- Adithi Kalkunte as Neela
- Sharlto Copley as Tiger

Musician Zakir Hussain appears as a tabla maestro.

== Production ==
=== Development and filming ===
Around 2014, Dev Patel conceived the image of a man wearing a rubber monkey mask in a wrestling ring in "the armpit of India" and wrote down the words "Monkey Man". On October 29, 2018, it was reported that Patel would make his directorial debut with an action thriller film titled Monkey Man, which he co-wrote with Paul Angunawela and John Collee, and was set to star in. Initially, Patel tried to recruit his Chappie director, Neill Blomkamp to direct but Blomkamp declined and suggested he direct it himself given Patel's descriptions and passion for the project. Speaking of his work on the film, Patel stated, "I think the action genre has sometimes been abused by the system. I wanted to give it real soul, real trauma, real pain ... And I wanted to infuse it with a little bit of culture."

Patel had seen Pitobash Tripathy in Million Dollar Arm (2014), and invited the actor to audition for Alphonso. Vipin Sharma, who had a small role in Hotel Mumbai (2018) starring Patel, was quickly cast as Alpha after a brief audition. Sobhita Dhulipala had auditioned for Monkey Man before getting her first film role in 2016, but did not hear back from the production team until 2019, when Patel confirmed that she got the part of Sita "from the moment he saw her audition".

Initially gearing up to shoot on location in India in early 2020, the film was postponed and nearly canceled as a result of the coronavirus pandemic across that country. Patel then opted to shoot the film on a small island in Batam, Indonesia. While filming the first action sequence, Patel broke his hand. He later broke two of his toes when a stuntman dropped an ax on his foot by accident.

On March 12, 2021, it was announced that filming was completed and Netflix had acquired distribution rights for the world excluding Latin America, Spain, Iceland, Poland, former Yugoslavia, Russia, the Baltics, China, Hong Kong, Indonesia, and pan-Asian pay television for $30 million. However, Netflix later felt the film was too gritty for Indian audiences and was concerned about their reaction to the film's political commentary, instead quietly shopping it around and nearly cancelling the release. Of this decision, Patel said, "[Netflix] didn't really know what they'd bargained for. The actual film itself is a lot denser and it's saying a lot... it's not your usual action scene on page one, and then you continue fighting nonstop. It's trying to do a bit more." Sometime thereafter, Jordan Peele saw the film and came on board as producer under his Monkeypaw Productions banner and persuaded Universal Pictures (with which Monkeypaw has an exclusivity deal) to acquire the film from Netflix for under $10 million. Patel later stated that Peele "took us from this thing that was brushed under the carpet to putting us on top of the mantel piece."

=== Soundtrack ===
Jed Kurzel composed a new score for the film, replacing original composer Volker Bertelmann. The soundtrack includes a song by the Indian folk metal band Bloodywood.

== Themes ==
Monkey Man explores themes of societal challenges, including corruption, discrimination, caste system, poverty, and the experiences of the Hijra community in India. The film contains news footage from actual protests and pogroms depicting Hindu nationalism in India.

== Release ==
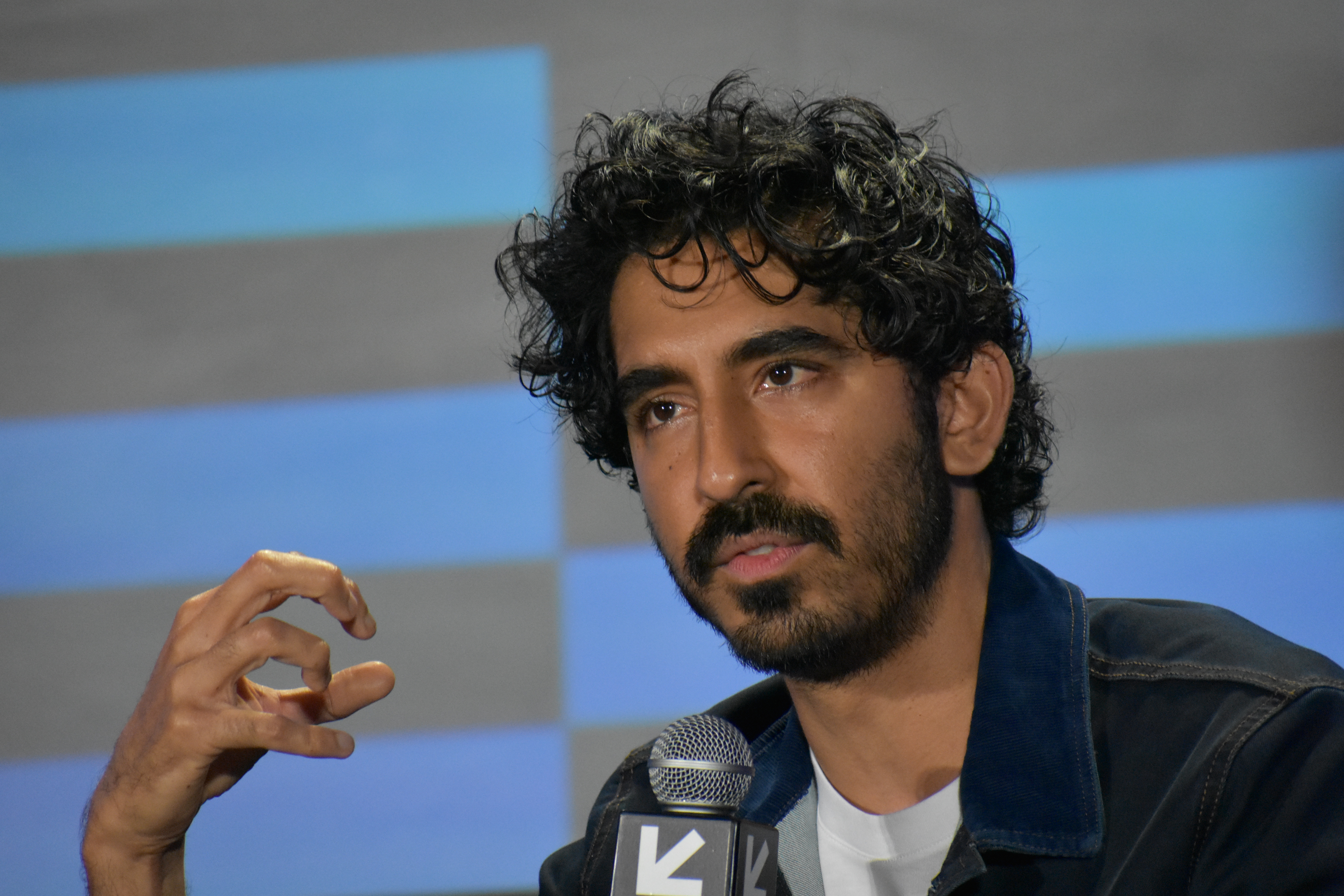
Director Dev Patel at SXSW 2024

Monkey Man had its world premiere at South by Southwest on March 11, 2024. It had its Sydney premiere on April 2, 2024, attended by Patel and his partner, Australian actress Tilda Cobham-Hervey, and was released in Australian cinemas on April 4. The film was released in the United States, Canada, the United Kingdom, and Ireland by Universal Pictures on April 5, 2024.

The film was scheduled to release in India on April 19, 2024. However, it had reportedly been delayed amid concerns that the Central Board of Film Certification would require edits. According to a report by Bollywood Hungama on March 31, the movie still had yet to be certified by the CBFC. In articles for both IndieWire and Time, Indian film critic Siddhant Adlakha posited that the film's violent content and political themes might be the root cause for the delay. Ultimately, the film was not released in India.

== Reception ==
=== Box office ===
As of December 3, 2024, Monkey Man has grossed $25.1 million in the United States and Canada and $9.9 million in other territories, for a worldwide total of $35 million.

In the United States and Canada, Monkey Man was released alongside The First Omen, and was projected to make around $12 million from 3,029 theaters in its opening weekend. It made $4.3 million on its first day, including $1.4 million during its Thursday night previews. It went on to debut to $10.2 million, finishing second behind holdover Godzilla x Kong: The New Empire. In its second weekend the film made $4.1 million, finishing in sixth.

=== Critical response ===
On the review aggregator website Rotten Tomatoes, 89% of 306 critics' reviews are positive. The website's consensus reads: "An audacious effort from debuting director Dev Patel, Monkey Man dispenses action and sociopolitical commentary with equal aplomb." Metacritic, which uses a weighted average, assigned the film a score of 70 out of 100, based on 48 critics, indicating "generally favorable" reviews. Audiences polled by CinemaScore gave the film an average grade of "B+" on an A+ to F scale.

Richard Roeper of the Chicago Sun-Times described the film as "monumentally entertaining" with "a series of extended and elaborate fight sequences so bruising and hyper-violent they make the action in the Road House reboot seem like a game of Rock-Paper-Scissors". Penelope Debelle wrote in InReview: "This wild and stylish film...is totally brilliant and completely engaging" and that "Patel carries the movie in every sense". Candice Frederick in HuffPost wrote, "Even with its flaws, Monkey Man stands alone as a testament to what an actor can do once he takes his career into his own hands." Shirley Li in The Atlantic simililarly noted that Patel "asserts himself as someone who can break the boundaries Hollywood typically establishes for actors like him".

The New York Times wrote, "As the story comes into blurry focus, Patel gestures at the real world and folds in some mythology, but these elements only create expectations for a complex story that never emerges. What mostly registers is an overarching sense of exploitation and desperation: Everyone is always hustling someone else. That gives the movie a provocative pessimism." The Washington Post noted that "Monkey Man addresses the inequities of India's caste system in ways more pointed than you would expect. The glimpses of Mumbai poverty are brief but harsh, and at one point Kid takes refuge in a temple of abused transgender women [...] There's also the matter of the movie's main villain, Baba Shakti — a white-haired ultranationalist power broker who whips worshipful mobs into a frenzy. Aamina Inayat Khan, writing for Autostraddle, noted that while the film was "action-packed, violence-fueled John Wickean cinema", at its core it "is about an underdog taking down a religio-fascist regime, one that resembles India's sitting ruling party".

Saffron Maeve, writing for The Globe and Mail, described the film as "solid and blockbuster-audience friendly", but that its "woozy overediting [...] makes the theatrical experience tiring".

=== Accolades ===
Award	Date of ceremony	Category	Recipient(s)	Result	Ref.
South by Southwest Film Festival	March 16, 2024	Headliners Audience Award	Monkey Man	Won	
Golden Trailer Awards	May 30, 2024	Best Action	"Beast"	Won	
Golden Trailer Awards	May 30, 2024	Best Music	"Beast"	Nominated	
Golden Trailer Awards	May 30, 2024	Best Sound Editing	"Beast"	Won	
Golden Trailer Awards	May 30, 2024	Best Action TV Spot (for a Feature Film)	"Warrior"	Won	
Golden Trailer Awards	May 30, 2024	Best Sound Editing in a TV Spot (for a Feature Film)	"Blood"	Won	
Golden Trailer Awards	May 30, 2024	Most Original TV Spot (for a Feature Film)	"Levels"	Nominated	
Golden Trailer Awards	May 30, 2024	Best Action/Thriller TrailerByte for a Feature Film	"Smash"	Nominated	
Astra Midseason Movie Awards	July 3, 2024	Best Stunts	Monkey Man	Nominated	
Astra Film Awards	December 8, 2024	Best Action or Science Fiction Feature	Monkey Man	Won	
Astra Film Awards	December 8, 2024	Best First Feature	Dev Patel	Nominated	
British Academy Film Awards	16 February 2025	Outstanding Debut by a British Writer, Director or Producer	Dev Patel	Nominated	
