= Monkeypaw Productions =

American film and television production company

- Monkeypaw Productions' vanity plate; a heavily simplified version is used as its logo
- Type: Private
- Industry: Film; Television
- Founded: January 31, 2012; 14 years ago
- Founder: Jordan Peele
- Headquarters: Los Angeles, California, United States
- Key people: Jordan Peele (chairman and CEO); Win Rosenfeld; Ian Cooper
- Website: monkeypawproductions.com

Monkeypaw Productions is an American independent film and television production company founded by Jordan Peele on January 31, 2012. It is known for producing horror films, such as Get Out, Us, Candyman, Nope, and Wendell & Wild, as well as other films, such as Keanu and Monkey Man.

On October 1, 2019, the company signed a 5-year exclusivity deal with Universal Pictures.

== Overview ==
In 2012, Jordan Peele launched Monkeypaw Productions and released the comedy series Key & Peele on January 31, 2012, on Comedy Central. After the series ended in 2015, Peele and Keegan-Michael Key wrote the script for the action comedy film Keanu which was released on April 29, 2016, by New Line Cinema and Warner Bros. Pictures.

On September 21, 2015, it was announced that Peele would write and direct his directorial debut feature film Get Out, a social horror film starring Daniel Kaluuya and Allison Williams which was released on February 24, 2017, by Universal Pictures. Following the success of the film, Peele signed a two-year, first-look deal with Universal. The deal was made with the intention of highlighting stories and creatives from marginalized communities.

On November 3, 2015, it was reported that Henry Selick was developing Wendell & Wild, a stop motion animated horror comedy film based on an unpublished book by Selick and Clay McLeod Chapman. The film was set to star Key and Peele, the latter also being a writer and producer on the film. In March 2018, the film was picked up by Netflix. The film premiered at TIFF on September 11, 2022, and was later released on October 28, 2022.

On May 16, 2017, it was announced that the company and Bad Robot were producing a horror television series titled Lovecraft Country for HBO and Warner Bros. Television Studios. The series was based on and served as a continuation of the 2016 novel of the same name by Matt Ruff. The pilot was written by Misha Green, who served as the showrunner for the series. Peele, J. J. Abrams, and Ben Stephenson served as executive producers. The series premiered on August 16, 2020.

On May 8, 2018, it was announced that Peele would write and direct his second feature film Us, a horror film starring Lupita Nyong'o, Winston Duke and Elisabeth Moss. The film was released on March 22, 2019, by Universal Pictures. In 2019, Us was featured in a maze for Universal's Halloween Horror Nights and in 2022 as part of the terror tram.

On November 9, 2020, it was announced that Peele would write and direct his third feature film Nope, a science fiction horror film starring Daniel Kaluuya, Keke Palmer and Steven Yeun was released on July 22, 2022, by Universal Pictures. The original set of Jupiter's Claim, the fictional theme park featured in the film was added permanently as a part of Universal Studios Hollywood's Studio Tour. The set became the first Studio Tour attraction to open the same day as a film's release. In 2022, Nope was featured at Universal's Halloween Horror Nights as part of the terror tram with Us.

On September 1, 2021, Monkeypaw and Peele signed a multiyear TV deal with Universal Studio Group ending a previous first-look deal with Amazon Studios. The deal brought both film and television output under a partnership with Universal.

On March 20, 2023, it was announced that Peele would write and direct his fourth feature film. It was scheduled to be released on December 25, 2024, by Universal Pictures, but was removed from Universal's schedule due to the 2023 Hollywood labor disputes, before being rescheduled to October 23, 2026. On September 2, 2025, the film was removed from Universal's 2026 release schedule.

In 2023, Monkeypaw participated in the bidding war for Zach Cregger's mystery horror film Weapons, in conjunction with Universal Pictures, but after losing the auction, Peele parted ways with longtime managers Joel Zadak and Peter Principato, the latter of whom was also Cregger's manager.

On April 23, 2025, it was reported by Deadline that three vice presidents and four to five junior staffers were laid off. In May 2026, the company also laid off three members of its development team, continuing with four remaining members in the department.

== Feature films ==
Release date	Title	Director(s)	Distributor
April 29, 2016	Keanu	Peter Atencio	Warner Bros. Pictures
February 24, 2017	Get Out	Jordan Peele	Universal Pictures
August 10, 2018	BlacKkKlansman	Spike Lee	Focus Features
March 22, 2019	Us	Jordan Peele	Universal Pictures
August 27, 2021	Candyman	Nia DaCosta	Universal Pictures
July 22, 2022	Nope	Jordan Peele	Universal Pictures
September 2, 2022	Honk for Jesus. Save Your Soul.	Adamma Ebo	Focus Features
October 28, 2022	Wendell & Wild	Henry Selick	Netflix
April 5, 2024	Monkey Man	Dev Patel	Universal Pictures
September 19, 2025	Him	Justin Tipping	Universal Pictures

== Short films ==
Release date	Title	Director(s)	Distributor(s)
March 13, 2022	Moshari	Nuhash Humayun	Little Big Films; Monkeypaw Productions; Left Handed Films
June 7, 2025	Neverland	Ti West	Republic Records; Wicked Awesome Records
September 6, 2025	Imago	Ariel Zengotita	Universal Pictures
September 6, 2025	Morty	Chandler Crump	Universal Pictures
September 6, 2025	The Pigs Underneath	Charlie Dennis	Universal Pictures
September 6, 2025	Thick Skin	Helena Hawkes	Universal Pictures
September 6, 2025	Spilled Milk	Jared Leaf	Universal Pictures

== Television series ==
Year(s)	Title	Creator(s)	Network
2012–2015	Key & Peele	Keegan-Michael Key; Jordan Peele	Comedy Central
2018–2021	The Last O.G.	John Carcieri; Jordan Peele	TBS
2019	Weird City	Charlie Sanders; Jordan Peele	YouTube Premium
2019	Lorena	Joshua Rofé	Amazon Prime Video
2019–2020	The Twilight Zone	Simon Kinberg; Jordan Peele; Marco Ramirez	CBS All Access
2020–2023	Hunters	David Weil	Amazon Prime Video
2020	Lovecraft Country	Misha Green	HBO
2024	Scare Tactics	Scott Hallock; Kevin Healey	USA Network
2025	High Horse: The Black Cowboy	Jason Perez	Peacock

== Podcasts ==
Year	Title	Creator(s)	Network
2022	Quiet Part Loud	Jordan Peele; Mimi O'Donnell; Win Rosenfeld	Spotify
2022	Chutzpah: Hunters Presents True Stories of Resistance	Jordan Peele; David Weil	—N/a

== Books ==
Publication date	Title	Author
November 26, 2019	Get Out: The Complete Annotated Screenplay	Jordan Peele
October 3, 2023	Out There Screaming: An Anthology of New Black Horror	Various Authors
September 3, 2024	Us: The Complete Annotated Screenplay	Jordan Peele

== Video games ==
Year	Title	Developer	Publisher
TBA	OD	Kojima Productions	Xbox Game Studios
