= Win Rosenfeld =

American producer and screenwriter

- Born: February 22, 1978 (age 48); New York, New York, U.S.
- Education: Grinnell College
- Occupations: Screenwriter; Producer
- Years active: 2005–present

Win Rosenfeld (born February 22, 1978) is an American screenwriter and producer, best known for his collaborations with Jordan Peele.

== Early life ==
Rosenfeld was born in New York, New York on February 22, 1978. He graduated from Grinnell College in May 2000.

== Career ==
In October 2017, Rosenfeld became the president and CEO of Jordan Peele's company Monkeypaw Productions. Before joining the company, Rosenfeld produced several cult television series, including Nova ScienceNow and Dark Net. After his promotion, Rosenfeld has produced more popular television series such as the 2019 reboot of The Twilight Zone, Weird City, Lorena, The Last O.G., Hunters, Quiet Part Loud, and Scare Tactics. He also co-wrote the screenplay for the supernatural slasher film Candyman (2021), alongside Peele and Nia DaCosta. In October 2020, Rosenfeld and Peele signed on to produce the remake of Wes Craven's 1991 horror film The People Under the Stairs. In 2024, he produced the action thriller film Monkey Man and the sports horror film Him, both alongside Peele.

== Filmography ==
=== Feature films ===
Year	Film	Writer	Producer	Notes / Ref(s)
2018	BlacKkKlansman	No	Executive	
2021	Candyman	Yes	Yes	
2022	Nope	No	Executive	
2022	Honk for Jesus. Save Your Soul.	No	Executive	
2022	Wendell & Wild	No	Executive	
2024	Monkey Man	No	Yes	
2025	Him	No	Yes	

=== Short films ===
Year	Film	Credit	Notes / Ref(s)
2022	Moshari	Executive producer	
2025	Imago	Executive producer	
2025	Morty	Executive producer	
2025	The Pigs Underneath	Executive producer	
2025	Thick Skin	Executive producer	
2025	Spilled Milk	Executive producer	

=== Television ===
Year	Series	Writer	Producer	Notes / Ref(s)
2005–08	Nova ScienceNow	No	Yes	Directed 2 episodes Edited 8 episodes
2016	Dark Net	No	Yes	
2018–21	The Last O.G.	No	Executive	
2019	Weird City	No	Executive	
2019	Lorena	No	Executive	
2019–20	The Twilight Zone	Yes	Executive	Episode: "The Who of You"
2020–23	Hunters	No	Executive	
2022	Quiet Part Loud	No	Executive	Also creator
2024–present	Scare Tactics	No	Executive	
2025	High Horse: The Black Cowboy	No	Executive	

=== Music video ===
Year	Title	Role	Artist	Notes / Ref(s)
2025	"Neverland"	Producer	Kid Cudi	

== Accolades ==
Award	Date of ceremony	Category	Film	Result	Ref.
Black Reel Awards	February 28, 2022	Outstanding Screenplay, Adapted or Original	Candyman	Nominated	
NAACP Image Awards	February 26, 2022	Outstanding Writing in a Motion Picture	Candyman	Nominated	
