= Jahking Guillory =

American actor (born 2001)

- Born: May 14, 2001 (age 25); Long Beach, California, U.S.
- Occupation: Actor
- Years active: 2016–present

Jahking Guillory (born May 14, 2001) is an American actor, best known for his starring role in the 2016 film, Kicks. Guillory appeared in The Chi on Showtime, and the Netflix series On My Block as Latrelle. He was born and grew up in Long Beach, California. In 2025, Guillory enlisted in the United States Marine Corps out of Moreno Valley, California.

== Filmography ==
=== Film ===
Year	Title	Role	Notes
2016	Kicks	Brandon	
2017	Smartass	Kid K	
2023	Hard Miles	Woolbright	

=== Television ===
Year	Title	Role	Notes
2018; 2023	The Chi	Charles "Coogie" Johnson	3 episodes
2018–2019; 2021	On My Block	Latrelle	9 episodes
2018–2019	Five Points	Ronnie Martin	Recurring role, 13 episodes
2019–2020	Black Lightning	Brandon Marshall	Recurring role
2021	Insecure	Billy	1 episode
