= Hard Miles (film) =

2023 film by R.J. Daniel Hanna

- Theatrical release poster
- Directed by: R.J. Daniel Hanna
- Written by: R.J. Daniel Hanna; Christian Sander
- Produced by: Christian Sander
- Starring: Matthew Modine; Cynthia McWilliams; Jahking Guillory; Jackson Kelly; Damien Diaz; Zach Robbins; Leslie David Baker; Sean Astin
- Cinematography: Mack Fisher
- Edited by: Evan Schrodek
- Music by: Andrew Johnson
- Production company: Pensé Productions
- Distributed by: Blue Fox Entertainment
- Release dates: June 13, 2023 (Bentonville); April 19, 2024 (United States)
- Running time: 109 minutes
- Country: United States
- Language: English
- Box office: $448,235

Hard Miles is a 2023 American sports drama film written by Christian Sander and R.J. Daniel Hanna and directed by Hanna. It stars Matthew Modine, Cynthia McWilliams, Jahking Guillory, Jackson Kelly, Damien Diaz, Zach Robbins, Leslie David Baker, and Sean Astin.

The film had its world premiere at the Bentonville Film Festival on June 13, 2023, and was released in the United States on April 19, 2024.

== Premise ==
A beleaguered coach named Greg rallies a group of disgruntled teenage inmates of a correctional facility for a transformative 762-mile (1,226 km) bicycle ride from Denver to the Grand Canyon, where they must battle obstacles and each other.

== Cast ==
- Matthew Modine as Greg Townsend
- Cynthia McWilliams as Haddie
- Jahking Guillory as Woolbright
- Leslie David Baker as Skip Bowman
- Sean Astin as Speedy
- Jackson Kelly as Smink
- Damien Diaz as Atencio
- Zach Robbins as Rice
- Jaxon Goldenberg as Young Greg
- Judah Mackey as Young Doug

== Production ==
In June 2022, it was announced that Matthew Modine was cast in the film and that principal photography took place in Los Angeles and Lone Pine, California. In August 2022, it was announced that Sean Astin was cast in the film.

== Music ==
The film features the songs "Hard Miles" by Jake Hoot, "Feeling Alive" by Earl St. Clair, and "One Day" by Logic. Johann Sebastian Bach's Toccata and Fugue in D minor, BWV 565 plays during a scene in which the cyclists ride up a difficult climb.

== Release ==
Hard Miles had its world premiere at the Bentonville Film Festival on June 13, 2023. In July 2023, the film screened at Heartland Film Festival where it won the Jimmy Stewart Legacy award. It screened at Chicago International Film Festival, SCAD Savannah, Cinequest, and Newport Beach Film Festival in October 2023. The film also won audience awards at the Denver Film Festival the following month.

In August 2023, it was announced that Blue Fox Entertainment acquired the rights to the film.

The film was released theatrically in the United States on April 19, 2024.

According to an announcement from Munro Film, ‘Hard Miles’ will be released on digital platforms including iTunes/Apple TV, Amazon, Sky Store, Virgin Media, Rakuten, Google Play, and Microsoft starting September 2, 2024.

== Reception ==
On the review aggregator website Rotten Tomatoes, 86% of 28 critics' reviews are positive, with an average rating of 6.8/10. The website's consensus reads: "A modest vehicle that wears its heart on its sleeve, Hard Miles charters an uncomplicated course towards uplift and arrives with plenty of good cheer still in the tank." Metacritic, which uses a weighted average, assigned the film a score of 70 out of 100, based on four critics, indicating "generally favorable" reviews.

== See also ==
- List of films about bicycles and cycling
