= Weird City (TV series) =

2019 American comedy science fiction web series

- Genre: Anthology; Science fiction; Comedy
- Created by: Charlie Sanders; Jordan Peele
- Starring: Dylan O'Brien; Ed O'Neill; LeVar Burton; Rosario Dawson; Michael Cera; Mark Hamill; Laverne Cox; Sara Gilbert; Steven Yeun; Gillian Jacobs; Yvette Nicole Brown; Auliʻi Cravalho; Chris Witaske
- Composer: Chad Fischer
- Country of origin: United States
- Original language: English
- No. of seasons: 1
- No. of episodes: 6

Production
- Executive producers: Jordan Peele; Jose Molina; Charlie Sanders; Adam Bernstein; Win Rosenfeld; Tom Lesinski; Jenna Santoianni; Sam Hansen; Jimmy Miller; Keith Raskin; Linda Morel
- Running time: 23-28 minutes
- Production companies: Monkeypaw Productions; Sonar Entertainment; Mosaic; Raskal Productions; Chuckystuff Pictures

Original release
- Network: YouTube Premium
- Release: February 13, 2019

Weird City is an American comedy science fiction anthology streaming television series released on YouTube Premium on February 13, 2019.

== Premise ==
Weird City is set in the near future in the city of Weird, which has been physically divided into two halves and segregated by economic class: Above The Line, populated by Haves, and Below The Line, populated by Have-Nots. Each episode follows different individuals as they navigate life in the city.

== Episodes ==
=== Season 1 (2019) ===
| No. | Title | Directed by | Written by | Original release date |
|---|---|---|---|---|
| 1 | "The One" | Adam Bernstein | Charlie Sanders & Jordan Peele | February 13, 2019 |
Stu (Dylan O'Brien) lives Above The Line but was born Below it, and thus was never assigned a romantic partner at birth. He uses a dating service that claims to find perfect matches, and is paired with Burt (Ed O'Neill). Despite both men identifying as straight and their significant age difference, they form a friendship that quickly becomes romantic, they even get married. A year later, they are forcibly separated and assigned new partners by Dr. Negari (LeVar Burton), the founder of the dating service, who informs them their match was made in error. Stu and Burt decide to move Below The Line in order to remain with each other. Cast : Dylan O'Brien, Ed O'Neill, LeVar Burton, Chris Witaske
| 2 | "A Family" | Adam Bernstein | Charlie Sanders | February 13, 2019 |
Kicked out of his Pomegranate Electrolyte Juice addiction support group and fired from his job, failure Tawny (Michael Cera) joins ShapeCult gym hoping to find the acceptance he so desperately needs. Unfortunately, his psychotic obsession with approval puts him at odds with his gym trainer Delt (Rosario Dawson). Cast : Michael Cera, Rosario Dawson, Matt Walsh, Ian Roberts, Eugene Cordero
| 3 | "Go to College" | Tricia Brock | Charlie Sanders | February 13, 2019 |
School valedictorian Rayna (Auliʻi Cravalho) receives a college scholarship and discovers that life is different at her new Above the Line school. Especially when it comes to dating and intimacy, where sexting is the preferred method. Cast : Auliʻi Cravalho, Trevor Jackson, Annalisa Cochrane, Feodor Chin
| 4 | "Smart House" | Tricia Brock | Charlie Sanders & Jose Molina | February 13, 2019 |
A couple, Liquia (Laverne Cox) and Jathryn (Sara Gilbert) purchase the Smart House (voice of Mark Hamill) of their dreams. However, their dream becomes a nightmare when the house turns on them, threatening their relationship and possibly their lives. Will they be able to outsmart their own smart home? Cast : Laverne Cox, Sara Gilbert, Mark Hamill, Andy Daly
| 5 | "Chonathan & Mulia & Barsley & Phephanie" | Amy Heckerling | Charlie Sanders & Suzanne Wrubel | February 13, 2019 |
When a group of Above-the-Liners (Gillian Jacobs, Hannah Simone, Malcolm Barrett, and Steven Yeun) decide to sponsor a poor Below the Line kid, they agree to do more than simply donate money. They kidnap him. Cast : Gillian Jacobs, Hannah Simone, Malcolm Barrett, Steven Yeun, Scott MacArthur
| 6 | "Below" | Amy Heckerling | Charlie Sanders | February 13, 2019 |
Criminals Charlotta (Awkwafina) and Glail (Yvette Nicole Brown) discover that they actually aren’t who they think they are – they’re really actors on a show that airs in Weird City. Their discovery leads them to question their very existence. Cast : Awkwafina, Yvette Nicole Brown, Charlie Sanders

== Production ==
=== Development ===
On June 28, 2018, it was announced that YouTube had given the production a series order for a first season consisting of six episodes. Executive producers were set to include Jordan Peele, Jose Molina, Charlie Sanders, Adam Bernstein, Win Rosenfeld, Tom Lesinski, Jenna Santoianni, Sam Hansen, Jimmy Miller, Keith Raskin, and Linda Morel. Bernstein was expected to direct the first two episodes and Molina to serve as showrunner. It was reported in January 2019 that Amy Heckerling, Tricia Brock, and Adam Bernstein would serve as directors for the series with each directing two episodes.

=== Casting ===
On July 27, 2018, it was announced that guest stars in the first season would include Sara Gilbert, Dylan O'Brien, Ed O'Neill, Rosario Dawson, Michael Cera, Laverne Cox, and LeVar Burton. On January 9, 2019, it was reported that Awkwafina, Hannah Simone, Gillian Jacobs, Malcolm Barrett, Mark Hamill, Yvette Nicole Brown, Trevor Jackson, Travis Bryant and Auliʻi Cravalho would also make guest appearances.

=== Filming ===
Principal photography for the series began on July 20, 2018 in the Toy District of Downtown Los Angeles, California. Filming took place at various locations around Downtown Los Angeles that week including the Calvin S. Hamilton Pedway and the Jewelry District.

== Release ==
On January 9, 2019, the official trailer for the series was released. All six episodes of the first season were released on February 13.

== Reception ==
The review aggregator website Rotten Tomatoes reported an 83% approval rating for the first season, with an average rating of 6.16/10 based on 23 reviews. The website's consensus reads, "A delightfully off-kilter combination of satire and science fiction, Weird City lives up to its name and then some -- even when it retreads familiar genre ground."
