= Death Valley (American TV series) =

- Genre: Black comedy Supernatural; Comedy horror Mockumentary
- Developed by: Eric Weinberg; Curtis Gwinn; Spider One (concept)
- Starring: Bryan Callen; Charlie Sanders; Bryce Johnson; Caity Lotz; Tania Raymonde; Texas Battle
- Composers: Matthew Compton; Homario Suby (music)
- Country of origin: United States
- Original language: English
- No. of seasons: 1
- No. of episodes: 12

Production
- Executive producers: Austin Reading; Eric Weinberg; Julie Kellman Reading; Tim Healy; Darren King; Tony Dibari
- Producer: Kent Zbornak
- Cinematography: Christian Sprenger
- Camera setup: Jeff Bollman
- Running time: 22 minutes
- Production companies: Liquid Theory; Guitar & Pen Productions; MTV Production Development

Original release
- Network: MTV
- Release: August 29 – November 21, 2011

Death Valley is an American horror black comedy mockumentary television series broadcast on MTV. The series premiered on August 29, 2011. The series follows the Undead Task Force (UTF), a newly formed division of the LAPD, as they are filmed by a camera news crew documentary-style, as they capture the monsters that roam the streets of San Fernando Valley in California. In March, 2012, the show's creator announced that Death Valley had not been picked up for a second season.

== Series overview ==
A year prior to the opening of the series, vampires, werewolves and zombies mysteriously descended upon the streets of California's San Fernando Valley. The newly formed Undead Task Force (UTF), a division of the Los Angeles Police Department, is created to combat the emergence of monsters in the San Fernando Valley. A camera crew is embedded within the task force to document the zombie, vampire and werewolf encounters. The series was cancelled by MTV in 2012.

== Cast ==
- Bryan Callen as Capt. Frank Dashell
- Charlie Sanders as Officer Joe Stubeck
- Bryce Johnson as Officer Billy Pierce
- Caity Lotz as Officer Kirsten Landry
- Tania Raymonde as Officer Carla Rinaldi
- Texas Battle as Officer John "John-John" Johnson

== Production ==
Death Valley was developed and conceptualized by Spider One (vocalist of Powerman 5000) years ago, and the series was given a 12-episode order by MTV on September 14, 2010. The series is executive produced by Austin Reading, Eric Weinberg, Julie Kellman Reading, and Tim Healy. Charlie Sanders, Caity Lotz, and Tania Raymonde joined the cast in September, Sanders playing Officer Joe Stubeck, Lotz playing Officer Kirsten Landry, and Raymonde playing Officer Carla Rinaldi. Bryan Callen joined the series in October, as Captain Frank Dashell. The series premiered on August 29, 2011.

== Episodes ==
No.	Title	Directed by	Written by	Original release date	U.S. viewers (millions)
1	"Pilot"	Eric Appel	Curtis Gwinn & Eric Weinberg	August 29, 2011	1.86
In the series premiere, the camera news crew of Channel 5 film LAPD's Undead Task Force (UTF) cops as they capture, contain, and kill vampires, werewolves, and zombies on the streets of San Fernando Valley in California. A vampire pimp is killed in a prostitution sting, a routine zombie kill leads to a crew member's death at a donut shop, Officer Pierce is kidnapped by a band of biker vampires, and rookie Officer Landry has to prove herself while battling a zombie on her own at the station.
2	"Help Us Help You"	Eric Appel	Eric Weinberg	September 5, 2011	1.17
Captain Dashell introduces a new Monster Awareness campaign, Stu and Pierce keep tabs on vampire Sophia, and John-John and Rinaldi catch some trouble-making teens.
3	"Blood Vessels"	Drew Daywalt	Kristofor Brown	September 12, 2011	0.95
The UTF officers donate blood to put on a united front after the vampires hijack some bloodmobiles in a murderous attack. Carla and John-John get stuck in one when they get surrounded by zombies after running out of ammo, leaving Stubeck and Billy to rescue them. Meanwhile, Kirsten is sent on a special assignment to keep tabs on Dashell's niece at a party thrown by Rico, a vampire giving local teenagers the "Black Kiss", a buzz from his venomous saliva.
4	"Two Girls, One Cop"	Drew Daywalt	David Weinstein	September 19, 2011	0.81
UTF responds to an adult film shoot when one of the actors turns into a werewolf during an intimate scene and attacks the cast and crew. Meanwhile, Kirsten goes door-to-door on a routine safety check for the city ordinance full moon lockdown procedure, but finds that one werewolf escaped and is running rampant on the streets.
5	"Zombie Fights"	Drew Daywalt	Matt Lawton	September 26, 2011	0.51
After mistaking an elderly man for a zombie in a nursing home, John-John is put on desk duty, where he discovers "Zombie Fights" online and shows the rest of the force. However, he is shocked to see that one of the zombies is his dad. Meanwhile, Kirsten and Carla partner up on a 115 (zombie disturbance) at a clothing store, while Billy and Stubeck find out vampire terrorists have new ways of obtaining blood by hijacking bloodmoblies and taking the driver hostage. Later that night Stubeck is jumped by the vampires and Carla is revealed to be a lesbian.
6	"The Hottest Day of the Year"	Austin Reading	Mike Alber & Gabe Snyder	October 3, 2011	0.83
The nursing home mishap causes UTF to be on temporary oversight by Internal Affairs Deputy Chief Ribbings, who issues "P.U.S." (Possible undead Suspect) cards to help the team identify themselves to zombies. Carla and John-John must take Ribbings on their ride-along and soon get a call that some rabid zombies are loose at a nursery. Meanwhile, Billy find a new technique to kill a zombie by poking it with a nightstick making it explode in the 107 degree heat wave. Stubeck shows off his fun side by "Bowling for Zombies" with the squad car. Also, Kirsten follows Dashell's niece again and discovers that Rico the vampire is recruiting underage girls through a "turning party".
7	"Who, What, When, Werewolf... Why?"	Jordan Vogt-Roberts	Jenifer Rice-Genzuk Henry	October 17, 2011	0.54
The LA Department of Sanitation goes on strike after failing to sign a new contract, making the UTF now responsible for collecting and disposing of all zombie kills. Billy and Dashell hunt the vampire who jumped Stubeck outside a bar a couple of weeks ago. John-John steals a Rolex from a zombie for Carla's birthday, and Kirsten unknowingly starts dating a guy who's a werewolf.
8	"Undead Hookers"	Austin Reading	Matt Lawton	October 24, 2011	N/A
The UTF receives new point of view cameras called "Looxies" to wear on their patrols. Billy and Stubeck lose a fellow officer in the line of duty while thinking a crack addict is a zombie. Meanwhile, Carla goes undercover as a vamp hooker playing "blood for sex" in a seedy motel but she has to get rescued by John-John from a vampire named Juan attacking her.
9	"Tick, Tick, Boom"	Jordan Vogt-Roberts	Kristofor Brown	October 31, 2011	N/A
When Kirsten's cover is blown, she tells Captain Dashell the truth about vampire Rico preying on his niece. She then gets thrown off the force while Dashell goes after him. Meanwhile, Billy and Stubeck take out a "bombie" (a zombie with a bomb inside its body) at Stu's daughter's elementary school. Also after blasting zombies in an elevator at an office building, Carla gives John-John a peek into her private life when they grab breakfast at a diner with her girlfriend.
10	"Assault on Precinct UTF"	Austin Reading	Eric Weinberg	November 7, 2011	N/A
Captain Dashell, his UTF squad, and two LAPD officers try to take back their precinct with limited ammo after a van full of zombie prisoners crashes into the precinct. However, more hell breaks loose when the vampires launch an all-out assault on the station to rescue Rico. Plus once pegged a traitor, officer Landry takes a bullet and saves Dashell, earning her the right to stay on the force. Also John-John makes a life-threatening mistake after the ordeal is over.
11	"Partners"	Jordan Vogt-Roberts	Eric Weinberg	November 14, 2011	N/A
After neighbors report strange noises and smells coming from an elderly lady's house, Officers Rinaldi and Landry visit her and discover her zombie husband she keeps strapped to their bed because she can't let him go. Meanwhile, Captain Dashell believes there's a mole on the force and asks Stubeck to find out who it is and the evidence leads to the film crew. Also Dashell threatens Rico's powerful vampire father Santos at the funeral for the two LAPD officers killed in the precinct assault after Santos suggests he come to his son's funeral to offer a peace agreement.
12	"Peace in the Valley"	Peter Lauer	Eric Weinberg	November 21, 2011	N/A
When Billy and Stubeck meet up with a couple of vampires to discuss the peace summit meeting, they let the vamps do their jobs for them when they take care of a zombie using mind control. Meanwhile, Landry learns that Dashell's niece Natalie was "turned" by Rico and will become a vampire after her first kill. In continuation of his peace offerings, vamp boss Santos proposes a sit-down at a neutral site with Captain Dashell. However, they don't stick to the agreement when four vampires posing as nurses pay a visit to John-John while he's in the hospital. Carla has to fight the night nurse vamp Aurora before she injects infected blood into John-John's system, but she gets help from an unexpected ally. Also a new threat is discovered at the peace signing.

== See also ==
- "X-Cops," an X-Files episode done in the style of COPS
- List of police television dramas
- List of vampire television series
