= The Twilight Zone (2019 TV series) =

2019 American anthology television series

- Genre: Anthology; Drama; Fantasy; Horror; Science fiction; Thriller
- Created by: Rod Serling
- Developed by: Simon Kinberg; Jordan Peele; Marco Ramirez
- Presented by: Jordan Peele
- Theme music composer: Marius Constant
- Composers: Marco Beltrami; Brandon Roberts
- Country of origin: United States
- Original language: English
- No. of seasons: 2
- No. of episodes: 20

Production
- Executive producers: Simon Kinberg; Jordan Peele; Win Rosenfeld; Audrey Chon; Carolyn Serling; Rick Berg; Greg Yaitanes; Glen Morgan
- Production locations: Vancouver, British Columbia
- Cinematography: Mathias Herndl; Craig Wrobleski
- Editor: Scott Turner
- Running time: 31–56 minutes
- Production companies: CBS Television Studios; Monkeypaw Productions; Genre Films

Original release
- Network: CBS All Access
- Release: April 1, 2019 – June 25, 2020

Related
- The Twilight Zone (1959–64); The Twilight Zone (1985–89); The Twilight Zone (2002–03)

The Twilight Zone is an American anthology television series developed by Simon Kinberg, Jordan Peele, and Marco Ramirez, based on the original 1959 television series created by Rod Serling. Peele serves as narrator, in addition to executive producing through Monkeypaw Productions. The weekly series premiered on April 1, 2019, on CBS All Access, and was renewed for a second season halfway through its first set of 10 episodes. The second season was released in its entirety on June 25, 2020. In February 2021, the producers announced the series would not return for additional seasons.

== Production ==
=== Background ===
As in the original series, each episode in this incarnation of The Twilight Zone deals with a different topic, addressing such subjects as supernatural occurrences, racism, social issues, misinformation in the press, alien invasions, and immigration, with an unusual and an unexpected twist in each program. Notable episodes include Sanaa Lathan as a woman who discovers that her camcorder can turn back time, Chris O'Dowd as an anthropologist who studies a strange gun, Morena Baccarin as a hotel manager who finds everyone around her standing still, and Damon Wayans Jr. as a church handyman who finds that he can change his town by manipulating a smaller model of it. John Larroquette, Donna Dixon, Eric Keenleyside, Kristin Lehman, Ryan Robbins, Peter Kelamis, Ethan Embry, Gil Bellows, and George Takei also worked in these two seasons of the Twilight Zone.

In addition to increasing the altitude, "Nightmare at 30,000 Feet" follows a path that is different from that of the iconic 1963 episode starring William Shatner, "Nightmare at 20,000 Feet". The 2019 episode "You Might Also Like" is connected with the classic episode "To Serve Man". "Blurryman" is a metafictional episode in which Mark Silverman reprises his impersonation of Rod Serling from The Twilight Zone Tower of Terror Disney attraction. Previous Twilight Zone series had episodes with metafictional elements, notably the original series episode "A World of His Own", where the main character interacts with Serling, and the 1980s revival series episode "Personal Demons", in which Martin Balsam portrays a fictional version of the episode's writer.

=== Development ===
In December 2012, it was announced that Bryan Singer had finalized a deal to develop, executive produce, and potentially direct a third revival of The Twilight Zone for CBS Television Studios. At the time of the announcement, the production had yet to hire a writer, begun being shopped to networks and was still finalizing a deal with the Serling estate. On March 7, 2013, it was reported that a writer was in negotiations to join the series. By 2016, Simon Kinberg and Craig Sweeny had joined the production and CBS was weighing whether to shop the project to other networks or streaming services or to place it on their own CBS All Access. Kinberg eventually left the project to write and direct the film Dark Phoenix and Singer and Sweeny soon dropped out as well.

On November 2, 2017, it was announced that CBS was redeveloping the revival for their streaming service CBS All Access. Additionally, it was reported that Jordan Peele was in talks to executive produce the series through his production company Monkeypaw Productions and that Marco Ramirez was in talks to serve as showrunner. On December 6, 2017, it was announced that CBS had given the production a series order. Peele and Ramirez were confirmed to executive produce alongside Simon Kinberg, Win Rosenfeld, Audrey Chon, Carolyn Serling, and Rick Berg. Peele, Ramirez, and Kinberg were also set to collaborate on the series' premiere episode. Production companies involved with the series were slated to consist of CBS Television Studios, Monkeypaw Productions, and Genre Films.

On August 6, 2018, it was confirmed that the first season would consist of ten episodes. Additionally, it was reported that the production had established a writers' room and completed concepts, outlines, and scripts for the first season in various stages of development. The series was not planned to have a formal showrunner but director Greg Yaitanes was set to be in charge of overseeing continuity among episodes. On September 20, 2018, it was announced that, in addition to executive producing, Peele would serve as the series' narrator and host. On October 2, 2018, it was announced via a promotional video for the series that Gerard McMurray was directing an episode with Mathias Herndl serving as his director of photography. On November 15, 2018, it was reported that Alex Rubens would write an episode of the series.

On April 29, 2019, the series was renewed for a second season. In January 2020, CBS All Access revealed episode information on six of the ten episodes of the second season. In May 2020, information on the final four episodes of the season were revealed. On February 24, 2021, CBS All Access announced the series would be ending after two seasons; Peele and Kinberg's companies released a joint statement indicating that although All Access (rebranded as Paramount+) wanted the series to continue, it was "our decision" and that they had "told the stories that we wanted to tell".

=== Casting ===
In October 2018, the production company announced that Sanaa Lathan and Adam Scott had been cast in episode-starring roles; Lathan would appear in an episode titled "Rewind" and Scott in an episode titled "Nightmare at 30,000 Feet", a remake of the original series episode "Nightmare at 20,000 Feet". In November, Kumail Nanjiani was announced in an episode-starring role. In December, John Cho, Allison Tolman, Jacob Tremblay, Erica Tremblay, Steven Yeun, and Greg Kinnear were announced: Cho, Tolman, and the Tremblays for roles in an episode titled "The Wunderkind", and Yeun and Kinnear in "The Traveler" (broadcast as "A Traveler"). In January 2019, DeWanda Wise, Jessica Williams, Lucinda Dryzek, Jefferson White, Jonathan Whitesell, Taissa Farmiga, Rhea Seehorn, Luke Kirby, Ike Barinholtz, and Percy Hynes White were announced: Wise, Williams, Dryzek, White, and Whitesell would appear in one episode, while Farmiga, Seehorn, Kirby, Barinholtz, and Hynes-White would be featured in another. In February, Ginnifer Goodwin, James Frain, and Zabryna Guevara were announced as cast for "Point of Origin". The full trailer revealed that Tracy Morgan, Glenn Fleshler and Chris Diamantopoulos would make guest appearances. It was revealed through the official Twitter page that Seth Rogen would appear in an episode. In March, the casting of Zazie Beetz and Betty Gabriel for one episode was announced, while Chris O'Dowd and Amy Landecker would appear in "The Blue Scorpion". Damson Idris was then announced to appear in "Replay", the episode previously titled "Rewind".

In January 2020, several cast members for the second season were announced, which included: Morena Baccarin, Tony Hale, Billy Porter, Christopher Meloni, Joel McHale, Jimmi Simpson and Gillian Jacobs. In May 2020, another round of castings were revealed, which included: Topher Grace, Jurnee Smollett and Damon Wayans Jr.

=== Filming ===
Principal photography for season one began on October 1, 2018, in Vancouver, British Columbia, and concluded on March 20, 2019. The producers chose to make the series in color instead of black and white. Executive producer Simon Kinberg stated that the team "wanted to do something to honor the essence and sensibility and style of the original without going so overboard that we were doing a karaoke version of the original." However, the series was also made available to watch in black and white. For the opening sequence, executive producer Simon Kinberg stated that imagery was chosen that reflected the original television series, something used in place of a black-and-white color scheme. Filming for the second season commenced from October 6, 2019, to March 16, 2020, in Vancouver.

== Episodes ==
Season	Episodes	Originally released	
Season	Episodes	First released	Last released
1	10	April 1, 2019	May 30, 2019
2	10	June 25, 2020	

=== Season 1 (2019) ===
No. overall	No. in season	Title	Directed by	Written by	Original release date
1	1	"The Comedian"	Owen Harris	Alex Rubens	April 1, 2019
Struggling stand-up comedian Samir Wassan meets legendary comic J.C. Wheeler, who advises him to include personal material in his routines. After doing a successful routine centered around his dog, Samir returns home and discovers that not only did his dog vanish, but no one seems to remember that it ever existed. He then finds whatever he jokes about, ceases to exist after the routines. It doesn't take him long before he abuses the ability for self gain. Cast: Kumail Nanjiani, Amara Karan, Diarra Kilpatrick, Ryan Robbins, Tracy Morgan
2	2	"Nightmare at 30,000 Feet"	Greg Yaitanes	Story by : Simon Kinberg, Jordan Peele and Marco Ramirez; Teleplay by : Marco Ramirez; Based on "Nightmare at 20,000 Feet" by : Richard Matheson	April 1, 2019
After accepting a job offer, PTSD-afflicted journalist Justin Sanderson boards Northern Goldstar Airlines Flight 1015. He discovers an MP3 player in his seat pocket and finds it contains a podcast about "the mystery of Northern Goldstar Flight 1015", which disappeared an hour into the flight. As the podcast accurately describes the progressing flight, Justin juggles control of his nerves and confides in a former pilot who lost his job for crashing a previous airplane and seems to be the only person who takes him seriously. As the MP3 podcast comes to a close Justin may save the plane or ensure the disappearance of the plane. Cast: Adam Scott, Chris Diamantopoulos, Dan Carlin, Katie Findlay, Nicholas Lea
3	3	"Replay"	Gerard McMurray	Selwyn Seyfu Hinds	April 11, 2019
While at a roadside diner with her college-bound son Dorian, Nina Harrison discovers that her old family camcorder has the power to turn back time when she presses the rewind button and that she is the only one aware of it. A racist state trooper Officer Lasky, notices them at the diner and later pulls them over for speeding and becomes violent with them. Nina rewinds time in various attempts to avoid Lasky but time seems to be against her. Cast: Sanaa Lathan, Damson Idris, Glenn Fleshler, Steve Harris
4	4	"A Traveler"	Ana Lily Amirpour	Glen Morgan	April 18, 2019
Alaska police sergeant Yuka Mongoyak has arrested her brother Jack to be the annual recipient of a ceremonial "pardon" from captain Lane Pendleton at his Christmas party, which she, as an Alaskan native, hates. At the height of the festivities, Yuka discovers another inmate has mysteriously appeared in the station's holding cells. His name is "legally" A. Traveler, and he claims he is an extreme tourist who has heard of Pendleton's YouTube-famous Christmas parties. Traveler plays on their paranoia and suspicions for a hidden agenda. Cast: Steven Yeun, Marika Sila, Patrick Gallagher, Eric Keenleyside, Andrew Kavadas, Gail Maurice, Greg Kinnear
5	5	"The Wunderkind"	Richard Shepard	Andrew Guest	April 25, 2019
Campaign manager Raff Hanks finds himself in a hospital and recounts the events leading to his hospitalization to a hospital attendant. Years earlier, Raff considered himself a wunderkind and had been a successful campaign manager. However, Raff's career is ruined after he and his partner Maura fail to get then-sitting and unpopular President of the United States James Stevens reelected. Years later, Raff spots a news segment about eleven-year-old YouTube star Oliver Foley announcing his candidacy for President. Seizing the opportunity to redeem himself, Raff convinces Oliver's parents about having him run. But allowing Oliver the presidency may turn The United States into his own personal playground. Cast: John Cho, Jacob Tremblay, Allison Tolman, Kimberley Sustad, Lane Edwards, Erica Tremblay, John Larroquette
6	6	"Six Degrees of Freedom"	Jakob Verbruggen	Heather Anne Campbell and Glen Morgan	May 2, 2019
The crew of the Bradbury spacecraft, led by Alexa Brandt, decide to head for the planet Mars after nuclear war breaks out on Earth. The crew members soon begin to turn on one another, despite Brandt's attempts to convince them to come together under times of stress. However, she too begins to break, devastating fellow crew members who give into their own paranoia, though something more sinister may be observing them through the proverbial microscope. Cast: DeWanda Wise, Jessica Williams, Jefferson White, Lucinda Dryzek, Jonathan Whitesell
7	7	"Not All Men"	Christina Choe	Heather Anne Campbell	May 9, 2019
Annie Miller is invited by her co-worker Dylan to watch a meteor shower. Dylan picks up one of the meteorites during the event, causing his attitude to change. After Annie leaves early, she witnesses Dylan destroy his record player. The next day, Annie visits her sister Martha who is celebrating her birthday with her husband Mike, nephew Cole, and Phil. Annie witnesses the men around town with the meteorites are behaving more violently as the day progresses, culminating in late night riots and violent crime sprees. Cast: Taissa Farmiga, Rhea Seehorn, Percy Hynes White, Luke Kirby, Peter Kelamis, Ike Barinholtz
8	8	"Point of Origin"	Mathias Herndl	John Griffin	May 16, 2019
Wealthy socialite Eve Martin is approached by her Guatemalan housekeeper and nanny Anna Fuentes asking if her grandson can use her address to attend a charter school in that district. Eve agrees while preparing a party for new parents. However, Anna is taken by ICE. While shopping with her daughters, Eve finds that what she knows about her life may have been an elaborate fabrication. Cast: Ginnifer Goodwin, James Frain, Toby Levins, Zabryna Guevara, Karin Konoval, Michael Eklund, Robert Mann
9	9	"The Blue Scorpion"	Craig William Macneill	Glen Morgan	May 23, 2019
Depressed anthropology professor Jeff Storck is about to divorce from his wife despite his pleas for counseling. On top of that, he finds that his father has apparently committed suicide. While in his dad’s house, he finds a gun called the Blue Scorpion with a bullet with his name on it. At the funeral, Jeff questions why his father would kill himself. With all that's going on in his life, Jeff contemplates killing himself with the gun after testing it at a gun range. Meanwhile, Jeff’s estranged wife has begun seeing another man, also named Jeff, which gets Jeff wondering about the guns intended victim. Cast: Chris O'Dowd, Amy Landecker, Alex Diakun, James Morrison, Adam Korson, Luisa D'Oliveira
10	10	"Blurryman"	Simon Kinberg	Alex Rubens	May 30, 2019
After rewriting the opening narration for an episode of The Twilight Zone starring Seth Rogen and Betty Gabriel for Jordan Peele, screenwriter and Twilight Zone fan Sophie Gelson discovers someone changed it to be about her. She later notices a mysterious blurry figure appearing in the background of several scenes as well as scenes from previous episodes. While searching for Jordan, Sophie encounters the Blurryman, who chases her through the studio. His Ultimate Identity reveals a special truth. Cast: Zazie Beetz, Betty Gabriel, Zibby Allen, Caitlin Stryker, Seth Rogen, Jason Priestley, Mark Silverman (as the voice of Rod Serling)

=== Season 2 (2020) ===
No. overall	No. in season	Title	Directed by	Written by	Original release date
11	1	"Meet in the Middle"	Mathias Herndl	Emily C. Chang & Sara Amini	June 25, 2020
A socially awkward single man named Phil begins hearing the voice of a woman in his head. His therapist suggests he is suffering from dissociative identity disorder; however, being able to talk to the voice, Phil leaves his therapist. Over the course of a few weeks Phil and the putative woman, named Annie, strike up a friendship which turns into a relationship. Phil decides to meet up with Annie in a location halfway between his city and hers. But unseen consequences of this attempt will soon strike him. Cast: Jimmi Simpson, Kristin Lehman, Mike Dopud, Gillian Jacobs
12	2	"Downtime"	J. D. Dillard	Jordan Peele	June 25, 2020
Michelle Weaver, an overachieving hotel clerk, gets promoted to manager. The same day, she is startled by a giant orb that appears in the sky, causing everyone but Michelle to stand still and enter a seemingly catatonic state. Running home, she encounters a police officer who advises her to "wake up". She finds that she is actually part of a virtual reality game called SleepAway, that people enter when sleeping, and that she is actually a man named S. Phineas Howell who had a heart attack while using SleepAway and is in a coma, explaining why she has no memory of her real life as Phineas. A choice has to be made. Cast: Morena Baccarin, Colman Domingo, Serinda Swan, Tony Hale
13	3	"The Who of You"	Peter Atencio	Win Rosenfeld	June 25, 2020
Harry Pine is an out-of-work actor trying to get another gig. After an argument with his girlfriend about money, he decides to rob a bank. During the heist, he makes eye contact with the bank clerk and swaps bodies with her just as the police burst in. Confused and disoriented, the clerk is arrested in Harry's body. Detective Reece, the officer in charge of the case, is noticing his bank robber is swapping bodies with various people in order to escape. But a darker secret is about to be revealed. Cast: Ethan Embry, Daniel Sunjata, Mel Rodriguez, Billy Porter
14	4	"Ovation"	Ana Lily Amirpour	Story by : David Weil; Teleplay by : Emily C. Chang & Sara Amini	June 25, 2020
Fiji, a disgruntled pop star, commits suicide after giving Jasmine, a street performer, a medallion. Upset, Jasmine begins to write and perform music at the scene of Fiji's suicide and is later told to appear in a singing competition series called Ovation. She manages to win the show, her popularity grows exponentially but the sudden success makes Jasmine uneasy. She begins to think that everything is caused by the medallion but her sister Zara reassures her that people love her just because of her talent. Things come to a spiral when she loses the medallion in the harbor and discovers how fleeting fame is. Cast: Jurnee Smollett, Tawny Newsome, Sky Ferreira, Dan Martin, Paul F. Tompkins, Thomas Lennon
15	5	"Among the Untrodden"	Tayarisha Poe	Heather Anne Campbell	June 25, 2020
An awkward teenage girl named Irene transfers to Saint Mary's Boarding School in the middle of the school year. A clique of popular girls at the school led by a girl named Madison immediately conspire to harass and bully Irene. While working on her school science fair project, Irene becomes convinced that Madison has psychic abilities and sets out to convince her. Eventually it appears that Madison does have several powers, including some ability to read minds, and to materialize needed objects which then disintegrate after they have served their purpose. But what will happen when Irene herself serves her purpose? Cast: Sophia Macy, Abbie Hern
16	6	"8"	Justin Benson & Aaron Moorhead	Glen Morgan	June 25, 2020
A team of scientists investigate the depletion of ice shelves while searching for new Antarctic species. Team member Doug resurfaces from diving, prevailing against an unknown hostile being. Meanwhile, a giant octopus kills one team member and hides near a diving hole. Although the team desires to seek revenge, a scientist named Ling insists on sparing the creature and takes it to the lab for observation. Later, when another scientist recovers the body of a fellow team member, most of the group believes the octopus is responsible for the recent deaths. The creature itself seems to have his own grand plan. Cast: Joel McHale, Nadia Hilker, Michelle Ang, Tim Armstrong, Brandon Jay McLaren
17	7	"A Human Face"	Christina Choe	Alex Rubens	June 25, 2020
Robert and Barbara's daughter Maggie has recently died. While Robert is taking apart Maggie's bed frame, the radio plays, warning of an impending cosmic flare. Suddenly, the radio glitches and the lights flicker out. They hear a noise downstairs and investigate. In their basement, they find a strange alien creature. The creature screeches at the couple and they run upstairs. Barbara asks Robert if he saw "her eyes", and exclaims that she felt Maggie in that creature. Robert denies this, arguing that the alien came from the cosmic flare. The truth of the matter yields an unexpected outcome. Cast: Jenna Elfman, Christopher Meloni, Tavi Gevinson
18	8	"A Small Town"	Alonso Alvarez-Barreda	Steven Barnes & Tananarive Due	June 25, 2020
In the town of Littleton, a church handyman who was the husband of the late mayor finds a model of the town in the church attic. Whatever he does to the model affects the town. Cast: Damon Wayans Jr., David Krumholtz, Natalie Martinez, Paula Newsome, Keegan Connor Tracy, Andrew Alvarez
19	9	"Try, Try"	Jennifer McGowan	Alex Rubens	June 25, 2020
A woman meets a man stuck in a time-loop who attempts to profess his love for her. His approach borders on stalking when she discovers what happened on these loops. Cast: Topher Grace, Kylie Bunbury
20	10	"You Might Also Like"	Osgood Perkins	Osgood Perkins	June 25, 2020
In a connection with "To Serve Man", a woman named Mrs. Warren who is known to get everything finds that she is losing time during the day, as are her neighbors – who are expecting the arrival of a mysterious egg that is advertised as "something they need". As she plans to obtain an egg of her own, she has an encounter with the Kanamits, and their Queen who soon explains to her what the egg is and its purpose. Cast: Gretchen Mol, Greta Lee, Gil Bellows, Colleen Camp, Donna Dixon, George Takei

== Release ==
On January 30, 2019, it was announced during the Television Critics Association's annual winter press tour that the series would premiere on April 1, 2019. A black-and-white version of the first season was released on May 30, 2019. The second season was released in its entirety on June 25, 2020. In February 2023, the series, among other Paramount+ and Showtime original series was removed from the service.

=== Marketing ===
On February 3, 2019, a teaser trailer for the series aired during the telecast of Super Bowl LIII. The commercial played as though it was interrupting CBS' feed of the game and it featured host Jordan Peele standing in an empty Mercedes-Benz Stadium. Another trailer was released on February 21.

== Reception ==
=== Critical response ===
==== Season 1 ====
On the review aggregator Rotten Tomatoes, the first season holds an approval rating of 70% based on 88 reviews, with an average rating of 7.39/10. The website's critical consensus reads, "The Twilight Zone explores the strangeness of the modern world through Rod Serling's winning formula, creating a thought-provoking—if not always spine-tingling—showcase for Jordan Peele and his exceptional crop of collaborators." Metacritic assigned the first season a weighted average score of 60 out of 100 based on 37 critics, indicating "mixed or average reviews".

The BBC gave it a positive review and said: "It's possible that ... Rod Serling and Jordan Peele switched places. As co-creator and on-screen host of the new version, he [Peele] updates the series while capturing the original's essence." The Week was more mixed in its review, calling the first episodes "unforgivably long", but also saying that the series stays "true to the ethos of The Twilight Zone" and that "the episodes are free-standing and timeless". The Verge also gave it a mixed review, praising Peele as the narrator, but saying the series should try to step away from the original. The Atlantic was more critical, comparing it to the original series, stating, "[w]ith the exception of one superior episode, 'Replay', it's hard to conceive that an artist as prodigiously talented and thoughtful as Peele is creatively involved at all."

==== Season 2 ====
The second season—based on three episodes sent to critics ("Meet in the Middle", "The Who of You" and "You Might Also Like")—has received mixed reviews from critics. On Rotten Tomatoes, the second season holds an approval rating of 63% based on 24 reviews, with an average rating of 6.39/10. The website's critical consensus reads, "The Twilight Zone sophomore season shines when it dares to be bold, but long runtimes and predictable plotting hold it back from reaching its full potential." Metacritic assigned the second season a weighted average score of 57 out of 100 based on 10 critics, indicating "mixed or average reviews".

Kristen Lopez of IndieWire gave the three episodes a collective grade of "B−" and wrote, "These episodes certainly feel more strongly written than Season 1, and if the editing tightens up like it did before, these new entries could be amazing. It'll be hard for any other episode to be better than 'You Might Also Like', though, which is a pure masterpiece." Brian Tallerico of RogerEbert.com wrote that "every episode in this trio disappoints to varying degrees".

=== Accolades ===
At the 71st Primetime Emmy Awards, Kumail Nanjiani received a nomination for Outstanding Guest Actor in a Drama Series for "The Comedian", the first episode of season one.
