= Hunters (2020 TV series) =

2020s American conspiracy drama television series

- Genre: Action; Alternate history; Black comedy; Conspiracy thriller; Crime drama
- Created by: David Weil
- Starring: Logan Lerman; Al Pacino; Jerrika Hinton; Lena Olin; Saul Rubinek; Carol Kane; Josh Radnor; Greg Austin; Tiffany Boone; Louis Ozawa; Kate Mulvany; Dylan Baker; Jennifer Jason Leigh; Udo Kier; Emily Rudd
- Theme music composer: Trevor Gureckis
- Composers: Cristobal Tapia de Veer (Season 1); Rupert Gregson-Williams (Season 2)
- Country of origin: United States
- Original language: English
- No. of seasons: 2
- No. of episodes: 18

Production
- Executive producers: Tom Lesinski; David Ellender; Jenna Santoianni; Win Rosenfeld; Nelson McCormick; Alfonso Gomez-Rejon; David Weil; Nikki Toscano; Jordan Peele; David J. Rosen
- Producers: Jerry Kupfer; Kris Baucom; Glenn Kessler; Mark Bianculli
- Cinematography: William Rexer; Tim Norman; Frederick Elmes; John Lindley; Tari Segal
- Editors: Matt Barber; Amy E. Duddleston; John Petaja; Andrew Groves
- Running time: 46–68 minutes; 90 minutes ("In the Belly of the Whale")
- Production companies: Monkeypaw Productions; Halcyon Studios (Note: Known as Sonar Entertainment in season 1); Big Indie; Black Mass Productions; Governor's Court; Amazon Studios

Original release
- Network: Amazon Prime Video
- Release: February 21, 2020 – January 13, 2023

Hunters is an American conspiracy drama thriller television series created by David Weil. It premiered on February 21, 2020, on Amazon Prime Video. In August 2020, the series was renewed for a second and final season, which premiered on January 13, 2023.

== Premise ==
It follows a diverse band of Nazi hunters living in 1977 New York City who discover that numerous escaped Nazi officers are conspiring to create a Fourth Reich in the United States. A parallel plot element involves the discovery of Operation Paperclip, the U.S. government operation relocating German scientists (many of them Nazis) to the U.S.

The series's characters draw from a number of real Nazi hunters through the decades, but are not meant to be a specific representation of any of them.

== Cast and characters ==
=== Main ===
- Logan Lerman as Jonah Heidelbaum, a young mathematics genius who takes his grandmother's place among the Hunters. Lerman joined the project due to the involvements of Jordan Peele, Alfonso Gomez-Rejon, David Weil and Nikki Toscano, and the series's moral dilemma of being bad to fight evil.
- Al Pacino as Meyer Offerman / Wilhelm Zuchs, a Nazi who evaded arrest by murdering a Polish-Jewish Holocaust survivor named Meyer Offerman. Zuchs then proceeded to steal Offerman's identity and underwent plastic surgery to resemble Offerman more closely. Under this stolen identity Zuchs, who has amassed great wealth and has become a philanthropist, recruits and leads the Hunters. It is Pacino's first TV series lead role; said the long-time actor, "I missed out on some great television offers I had in the past because the whole thing was: 'You don't do television.' That's what the advisors would say early on. I'm talking 30 years ago."
- Lena Olin as Eva Braun-Hitler / The Colonel, leader of the Fourth Reich and Hitler's wife.
- Jerrika Hinton as Millie Morris, an FBI agent who stumbles onto the Fourth Reich and the Hunters during a murder investigation. Hinton focused the most on the character's overwhelming faith in powerful institutions that are meant to protect citizens, such as the FBI. In studying the role, as well as the nature of the FBI in the 1970s, she had conversations with a Black woman named Jerri Williams, who, like Millie, was an FBI agent in the 1970s, and which, in Hinton's words, were "monumentally helpful".
- Saul Rubinek as Murray Markowitz (season 1), Mindy's husband and the Hunters' electronics expert; a German-Jewish Holocaust survivor.
- Carol Kane as Mindy Markowitz, Murray's wife and the Hunters' signals expert; a German-Jewish Holocaust survivor.
- Josh Radnor as Lonny Flash, an actor and master of disguises for the Hunters.
- Greg Austin as Travis Leich, an American Neo-Nazi acolyte drawn into the Fourth Reich. Austin chose the role because he wanted to challenge himself by playing a character completely unlike himself; he studied psychopathic characters in various television series, as well as serial killer Ted Bundy, for his role.
- Tiffany Boone as Roxy Jones, a member of the Hunters who specializes in counterfeiting and forgery.
- Louis Ozawa as Joe Mizushima, a Vietnam War veteran and the Hunters' combat expert.
- Kate Mulvany as Sister Harriet, a former MI6 operative who now works with the Hunters; a former German-Jewish child refugee named Rebecca.
- Dylan Baker (season 1, guest season 2) as Biff Simpson, an Undersecretary of State in the Carter administration and secretly an undercover Nazi agent, titled "The Butcher of Arlov".
- Jennifer Jason Leigh (season 2) as Chava "Ima" Apfelbaum, a Jewish Nazi hunter, Ruth's sister and Jonah's great-aunt.
- Udo Kier (season 2; stand-in guest season 1) as Adolf Hitler, the former Führer of the Third Reich, who faked his death, and mastermind of the Fourth Reich.
- Emily Rudd (season 2) as Clara, Jonah's fiancée.

=== Recurring ===
- Christian Oliver as the young Wilhelm Zuchs, "The Wolf", a Nazi doctor at Auschwitz who tormented both Meyer and Jonah's grandmother Ruth
- Victor Williams as Detective Kennedy Groton
- Jonno Davies as Tobias, the Colonel's body man
- James LeGros as Hank Grimsby, former OSS operative and now Millie's boss at the FBI
- Ebony Obsidian as Carol Lockhart
- Caleb Emery as Arthur "Bootyhole" McGuigan
- Henry Hunter Hall as Sherman "Cheeks" Johnson
- Jeannie Berlin as Ruth Heidelbaum, Jonah's grandmother and a survivor of Auschwitz
- Julissa Bermudez as Maria, Millie's girlfriend and a nurse
- Becky Ann Baker as Commerce Secretary Juanita M. Kreps
- Celia Weston as Dottie
- Joshua Satine as Aaron Markowitz

=== Guests ===
- Josh Mostel as Rabbi Steckler
- Barbara Sukowa as Tilda Sauer
- Judd Hirsch as Simon Wiesenthal
- Keir Dullea as Klaus Rhinehart
- William Sadler as Friedrich Mann
- John Noble as Fredric Hauser
- Victor Slezak as Wernher von Braun
- Jérôme Charvet as Armand
- Jim Meskimen as Judge Wolfgang Müeller
- Paula Arundell as Liana / Lauren
- Veronika Nowag-Jones as Gretel Fischer, a NASA scientist killed in the first episode and investigated by Millie Morris
- Max MacKenzie as Markus Roth

== Episodes ==
Season	Episodes	Originally released
1	10 (Note: "In the Belly of the Whale" was later divided into two separate episodes, or "parts".)	February 21, 2020
2	8	January 13, 2023

=== Season 1 (2020) ===
No. overall	No. in season	Title	Directed by	Written by	Original release date
1	1	"In the Belly of the Whale"	Alfonso Gomez-Rejon	David Weil	February 21, 2020
In 1977, United States Under Secretary of State Biff Simpson is recognized as a Nazi by a Jewish guest at his barbecue, prompting him to kill everyone present, including his own family. He has neo-Nazi Travis Leich intimidate a congressman into passing a bill that repeals sanctions on South America. Jewish Brooklyn-based codebreaker Jonah Heidelbaum witnesses the murder of his grandmother Ruth, being accosted at her funeral by Meyer Offerman, a man who claims that they were in Auschwitz together. He goes to Offerman's house and finds a secret office, discovering a picture of the car driven by Ruth's murderer. He tracks it to a toy store; its owner is Auschwitz guard Heinz Richter. Richter incapacitates him, and Jonah is saved by Offerman, who arrives and kills Richter. Ruth visited him a year prior after identifying a Nazi in her neighborhood, and they started the Hunters, a group dedicated to killing Nazis not brought to justice. Hunter Joe Mizushima kills NASA chemist Gretel Fischer, who secretly knew Adolf Hitler. Leich meets with "The Colonel", a woman who reveals that "the Solution" will be coming from South America soon. She asks him to investigate Fischer and Richter.
2	2	"The Mourner's Kaddish"	Wayne Yip	David Weil	February 21, 2020
Jonah is introduced to the Hunters and decodes a message regarding "Karl Holstedder" from a letter found in Richter's store, who Offerman explains is a former Nazi radio engineer. The Hunters break into his mansion and find that he is broadcasting a coded message to other Nazis. They torture Holstedder until he explains that he was given tapes to broadcast by another Nazi, before tricking Jonah into freeing him and taking him hostage. Joe kills him, accidentally stopping the broadcast in the process. FBI agent Millie Morris learns that the files on Fischer and her brother, also killed by the Hunters, have been cleaned out. She visits the man's widow, finding pictures of his atrocities as a Nazi doctor. The Colonel has Leich have sex with a senator, blackmailing him into supporting the repeal of South American sanctions. Leich then kills the detective who helped Morris investigate Fischer after he gives up her name. Two Nazis are shown taking instructions from the broadcast, planning to plant two bombs in New York City.
3	3	"While Visions of Safta Danced in His Head"	Wayne Yip	Nikki Toscano	February 21, 2020
While staking out Holstedder's house, the Hunters discover that a neo-Nazi has slipped inside and cleaned the place, who Hunter Roxy Jones is attacked by and forced to kill. Leich stalks Morris, who asks a colleague of hers to pull all the files on senior citizen refugees killed recently. She first looks into Richter, where Leich infiltrates the crime scene and finds Jonah's name embroidered on his jacket. Morris then looks into Ruth, getting Jonah's name from her rabbi. Jonah reads Ruth's old journal entries and learns that she was in love with Offerman. Hunter technician Murray Markowitz's hearing aid picks up morse code being played under Holstedder's broadcast, realizing from the code that Nazis were responsible for several major American events, including Watergate and the assassination of Robert Kennedy, as well as learning of the upcoming bombing. Leich goes to Jonah's place of work and kills his best friend when he refuses to give Jonah up.
4	4	"The Pious Thieves"	Nelson McCormick	Mark Bianculli	February 21, 2020
In 1942, two Auschwitz Jews fall in love and plan to escape, but the man is killed before he can give the woman a ring to propose with. Dissatisfied with his lack of recognition amongst the Nazis, Simpson gets Secretary of Commerce Juanita Kreps to push the bill that will keep the sanctions on South America, and Jimmy Carter signs it. Morris gets Offerman's name after searching Jonah's records and goes to his house, where Jonah refuses to cooperate with her. The Hunters trace two keys found on Richter and Holstedder to a Swiss-run bank, but cannot find the box the keys correspond to. They infiltrate it at night and Jonah discovers a secret underground vault full of valuables taken from Jews in concentration camps, amongst them the ring, which they take. Offerman goes to the bank's owner and presents him with the ring, torturing him until he gives up the name of the deposit box's owner: Oskar Hauptman, a feared Nazi Offerman believed to be dead. After he leaves, the owner commits suicide.
5	5	"At Night, All Birds are Black"	Dennie Gordon	David J. Rosen	February 21, 2020
Simpson bargains with the Colonel for a better position and forces Kreps to undo her vote. Morris tracks down a journalist that wrote an article on Fischer's brother at Offerman's request, who did not receive help from Offerman when he was falsely framed as a pedophile. Morris is attacked by men who warn her to stop investigating. Offerman's number one target, Wilhelm Zuchs, became attracted to Ruth in Auschwitz and tortured Offerman for hours because she loved him. Offerman later could have killed him but did not and begs Jonah not to make that mistake. Jonah goes with Hunters to Alabama and captures a former Nazi scientist at his Fourth of July party. Under Operation Paperclip, the government brought him and other scientists to the country to work for them; some of his comrades are at the party. After he reveals that Hauptman is working at the Edgewood Arsenal facility, Joe kills him while Hunter Sister Harriet rescues Nazi Moritz Ehrlich, and drives off with him. At Westchester County, Offerman's group interrogates a former propaganda filmmaker, whom Offerman kills when she accuses him of hiding something. Leich attacks them when they leave, but they get away.
6	6	"(Ruth 1:16)"	Millicent Shelton	Zakiyyah Alexander	February 21, 2020
In the 1940s, Murray and his Hunter wife Mindy's only child at the time is killed by Ehrlich. Hunter Lonny Flash has a book that he took from the filmmaker's house translated, which he learns is instructions for the rise of the Fourth Reich. Joe visits a veteran friend of his that had suffered severe brain damage due to the Edgewood Arsenal experiments, but manages to get Hauptman's American alias out of him. Jonah is asked to recite the Birkat Kohanim in place of Ruth at the wedding of the Markowitzes' daughter, but not knowing how, instead recites a different prayer that he finds meaningful. He later tells the Markowitzes that he finally understands his place in the Jewish community. Offerman unintentionally reveals that he may be Jonah's grandfather, but the arrival of Joe and Lonny with their findings stops Jonah from asking more. Harriet is revealed to have rescued Ehrlich because she knew what he did to the Markowitzes, and she ties him up and leaves him in their basement. Leich breaks into Offerman's house and burns his files on Nazis.
7	7	"Shalom Motherf***er"	Nelson McCormick	Eduardo Javier Canto & Ryan Maldonado	February 21, 2020
Leich sends the files on the Nazis the Hunters killed to Morris. Simpson convinces Carter to lift the sanctions, but Kreps asks a reporter to look into him. He threatens her into not looking further, but this catches the attention of Schidler Corporation head and Nazi Katarina Löw, who sends a Nazi to Simpson's house to kill him. He kills Simpson's mother-in-law, but Simpson kills him. Jonah gets Offerman to admit that he is his grandfather. The Hunters break into Hauptman's house, finding him ill and bedridden. Jonah realizes the music box on his nightstand is the source of the music in Holstedder's broadcast, cracking the code and confirming the locations the Nazis are planning to attack. Before they can leave, Offerman is detained by the FBI. He confirms to Morris that there are Nazis in America, but she refuses to believe his warning about the attack. The Markowitzes are called to help before they can decide whether or not to kill Ehrlich. The Hunters split up, and one group follows the coordinates to a power plant, where they are attacked by and kill Hauptman's wife. Jonah and Murray discover a bomb on a train, and Murray dies trying to defuse it. The twin explosions cause a blackout across New York.
8	8	"The Jewish Question"	Michael Uppendahl	David Weil & Charley Casler	February 21, 2020
In the chaos of the blackout, the Nazis move a chemical substance imported from South America to the Schidler factory in New Jersey. Simpson has the police called on him and narrowly escapes, being framed for his mother-in-law's murder. Tired of being demeaned by his superior, Leich strangles him. Offerman convinces Morris to let him go for one day, and he takes her to the Hunters. After Murray's funeral, Jonah blames himself for his death, and Offerman admits to him that he left Ruth because Zuchs forced him to kill other innocent men for her life, something he is deeply ashamed of. After accepting Murray's death, Mindy kills Ehrlich. The Hunters look into Schidler, finding it connected to former Nazi scientist turned American celebrity Wernher von Braun, who faked his death. Offerman goes to Simon Wiesenthal, who deeply disapproves of the Hunters, and Jonah convinces him to give them his file on von Braun. They track him down and Jonah tortures him until he admits that he made "the Solution" and tested it on Hauptman, and that it is a chemical hidden in corn syrup that kills those that consume it. Jonah continues to torture him, disturbing Offerman and Joe, who make him go outside as Joe kills von Braun.
9	9	"The Great Ole Nazi Cookout of '77"	Nelson McCormick	Nikki Toscano	February 21, 2020
Morris realizes her boss, an associate of Simpson's that he is trying to get help from, is part of Paperclip. She finds Simpson at his house and forces him to come with her. Harriet and Lonny abduct the Schidler factory's manager and get its layout. Lonny disguises himself as the manager as Jonah crawls through the vents and places bombs on several vats of Solution. Lonny manages to infiltrate the control center and set the vats to overflow, only for a newly promoted Leich, visiting with Löw and the Colonel, to recognize him. Joe rescues Lonny and they bomb the factory, killing Löw in the process. Jonah pursues Leich and is followed by an arriving Millie, while Simpson escapes in the chaos. Jonah and Leich fight and Jonah gets the upper hand, but Millie convinces him to spare him. The Colonel escapes, unaware that Offerman is driving her car until he reveals himself, and she shoots at him, causing the car to swerve into a river.
10	10	"Eilu v' Eilu"	Michael Uppendahl	David Weil	February 21, 2020
Simpson flees to Europe. Leich kills his Jewish lawyer in prison to rally antisemitic prisoners to his cause. Morris reports the factory incident to her superiors, who warn her to keep quiet about it. A Jewish congresswoman later asks her to lead a task force of Nazi hunters. Offerman is rescued from the water by Harriet, and expresses disappointment in Jonah for not killing Leich. Jonah discovers Ruth's file on Zuchs and realizes she had found him working as a surgeon before she died, and he kidnaps the man. Offerman kills him, but Jonah notices he did not recite the Kaddish as Ruth's notes said he would when he killed Zuchs, and concludes that "Offerman" is actually Zuchs. Zuchs explains that he killed the real Offerman to escape persecution after the liberation of Auschwitz and took his identity, undergoing plastic surgery from the surgeon he killed, committing fully to the Jewish faith, and doing penance for his evils by forming the Hunters with Ruth. Jonah kills him with a knife belonging to Ruth. Harriet suggests the Hunters move to Europe to hunt the Nazis who escaped under Die Spinne. Joe is kidnapped and taken to Argentina, where the surviving Colonel, revealed to be Eva Braun, lives with Hitler.

=== Season 2 (2023) ===
No. overall	No. in season	Title	Directed by	Written by	Original release date
11	1	"Van Glooten's Day 1972 Butter Sculptor of the Year"	Phil Abraham	David Weil	January 13, 2023
In 1972, a Holocaust survivor interrogates a resident of a town that Hitler crossed through, and the man gives her his town in Argentina. Three years later, Zuchs kills a former Auschwitz guard who recognized him. In 1979, the Hunters have disbanded and Jonah lives in Paris under a false name with his fiancée Clara. He tracks down Simpson and forces him to give up Hitler's location, killing him when he tries to fight back. In Pasadena, Morris catches a bishop who is a former Nazi, but he escapes justice when she tries to convict him through the legal system. She kills him in his home, which she immediately regrets. Jonah, whom she called earlier, arrives to see her. Hitler and Braun have dinner with Joe, now their servant.
12	2	"Buenos Aires"	Phil Abraham	David Weil and David J. Rosen	January 13, 2023
Harriet, having worked undercover as a governess for months, is forced to kill a Nazi working for Hitler in front of his children while interrogating him. Leich escapes from prison and is smuggled into Argentina by Braun, who takes him as a lover, and reveals her plans to usurp Hitler. Jonah convinces Morris that Hitler is alive, and they bring the reluctant Hunters back together to find the man who financed Hitler and Braun's escape. They travel to Buenos Aires and track the man down to the opera, where Jonah catches a man taking something out of a locker, but masked assailants working with Harriet kill the man to be killed and incapacitate the other Hunters.
13	3	"Duck. Quail. Goose. Crow."	Sam Taylor-Johnson	David J. Rosen	January 13, 2023
In 1975, Zuchs kills the Nazi who gave him his Offerman identity and burns the last evidence of his Zuchs identity. Wiesenthal, who suspects Offerman's role in the murder, urges him to stay clean and be a successful example for Holocaust survivors. In 1979, the woman from 1971 reveals herself to be Ruth's supposedly dead sister Chava, who is leading the group that captured the Hunters and a Nazi financier. She tortures the financier until he explains that only "The Crow" gets to see Hitler. They follow a clue to a hotel, where Jonah agrees to merge the Hunters with Chava's group to catch the Crow. While the others take out the Crow's guards, Chava explains to Jonah that she never contacted Ruth because he was there for her. Upset, he goes to the bathroom, though in reality he goes to confront and kill the Crow. He gives Chava a train ticket found in the Crow's purse. He is later surprised by Clara in the hotel lobby. Learning of the Crow's death, Hitler orders Joe to kill the Hunters.
14	4	"The Fare"	Phil Abraham	David J. Rosen & Daria Polatin & David Weil	January 13, 2023
In 1976, Zuchs – as Offerman – begins to assemble the Hunters after Ruth's report of spotting a Nazi goes nowhere. In 1979, Harriet is given the location of the Nazi who killed her father by Chava, but she does not kill him after witnessing his display of remorse. Roxy and Lonny argue about their ended relationship before going to the town of the train ticket, investigating a Nazi couple who admit they harbored Josef Mengele for years, but not Hitler. Jonah tells a suspicious Clara that he went to Argentina to track down Chava, and Clara demands to meet her. When Clara discovers Chava's files on Nazis, Chava reveals Jonah's true identity and occupation. As Jonah follows Clara back to the hotel, Leich attacks him and kidnaps Clara, tauntingly throwing a flower at Jonah as he drives away. Joe corners Roxy, Lonny, and Georges in an elevator, kills Georges, and hesitates before shooting Roxy in the chest.
15	5	"Blutsbande"	Tiffany Johnson	Tatiana Suarez-Pico	January 13, 2023
In 1975, Zuchs – as Offerman – travels to Germany to recruit a man for the Hunters. He visits his sister and niece (who are unaware of who he really is) and stops at his mother's grave. The man he was there to recruit confronts him at the cemetery and calls him out as Zuchs, who immediately kills him. In 1979, Lonny and Mindy rush Roxy to a hospital for emergency surgery. Millie confesses her guilt over killing the bishop to Harriet and, realizing their mutual attraction, they kiss. Hitler plans to implement nuclear attacks. Jonah and the remaining Hunters identify a town from the newspapers covering the windows of Leich's van, which next leads to a farm that supplied a flower thrown from the van. They arrive at the farm and are ambushed by Joe, Leich, and a squadron of neo-Nazis. The squadron is routed, so Leich threatens Clara's life, but Joe, overwhelmed by memories of Hitler's brainwashing and torture, shoots Leich. As the Hunters surround Joe, he claims he can take them to Hitler.
16	6	"Only the Dead"	Phil Abraham	Haley Z. Boston & Tori Sampson	January 13, 2023
In 1977, (Note: Just before the events of the first episode.) Zuchs and Harriet track down a Nazi killer in Argentina, revealed to be Chava. Zuchs asks her why she does not inform Ruth that she is alive, and she states her belief that Ruth was not meant for the work of hunting, while she is. In 1979, Braun tells Hitler that since he did not have children, she would be a fit leader for their regime due to her intelligence and carrying the Hitler name. Clara confronts Jonah on the incident that split the Hunters up, where he accidentally killed a child, and leaves in disgust. Joe directs the Hunters to Hitler's compound, where on the way, Chava tells the story of how she met and fell in love with Zev, the man who fostered her passion for Nazi hunting. The next day, the Hunters sneak in through Hitler's escape tunnel and massacre his guards as he is led to an impenetrable bunker. Chava covers Jonah, allowing him to follow Hitler, although she is killed. Jonah stops Hitler from committing suicide and decides to bring him to justice instead of killing him. Jonah ushers Hitler through the underground tunnel at gunpoint, surrounded by the ghosts of Hitler's victims.
17	7	"The Home"	David Weil	David Weil	January 13, 2023
While walking Hitler at gunpoint, Jonah relates a true story. In Germany, 1942, three Nazi officers visit the home of famed architect Heinrich Hansöm and his wife Helga on suspicion of harbouring Jews. Two of them discover concealed Jews, but are killed by traps constructed by Heinrich. Helga kills the third after he shoots at the young Zev hiding behind a false wall. The couple dispose of the bodies. Three more Nazis come looking for their colleagues. They find nothing. One of them, Rigard, covets the house and kills the couple, persuading his colleagues to frame the Hansöms. After the Rigards move in, Zev is spotted by Rigard's son Friedrich and the Jews have to kill the parents. To allay further suspicion, Rivka and Zev impersonate Friedrich and his mother. She lies to visiting Nazis that Rigard was unfaithful and has abandoned her, but Friedrich escapes from the hidden Jews and blows their cover and Rivka is shot. Zev kills several Nazis with the traps he has reset (having been taught by Heinrich), and escapes as more Nazis storm and burn the house. In the present, Jonah hands Hitler over to the adult Zev. As they depart, Zev sees a vision of the Hansöms.
18	8	"The Trial of Adolf Hitler"	Phil Abraham	David Weil & Charley Casler	January 13, 2023
Hitler is extradited to Germany and put on trial. Both defense and prosecuting lawyers are Jewish. Several Holocaust survivors testify, including Mindy. Hitler insists on testifying, and the prosecutor provokes him into admitting he ordered the Holocaust. He is sentenced to life imprisonment without parole. Leaving the courtroom, he swallows a concealed capsule that causes an apparent stroke. En route to the hospital, a pre-planned explosion cuts off pursuit. The ambulance driver kills Hitler's guards and revives him. Eva Braun, disgusted with Hitler's court performance, orders Leich to kill him, but Leich instead kills her and shows Hitler that he has recruited an army while in prison, hoping to become Hitler's heir. Jonah attacks them and Leich shoots him, but he is saved by Joe. The police capture Hitler while Leich escapes. Later, Jonah retires and marries Clara; Millie and Harriet are in a relationship; Roxy and Lonny have remained friends; and Joe has gone off alone to find peace. Harriet gives evidence to Jonah that Zuchs instigated Ruth's murder by giving Richter her address. Honeymooning in Miami, Jonah hears an old man near his table order in German and locks eyes with him.

== Context ==
Digital Spy writer David Opie considered a show about Jewish heroes like Hunters important, due to the marginalization of the Jewish religion in the fictional superhero landscape. While there are many Jewish comic book heroes, including Scarlet Witch, Kitty Pryde, the Thing, and Harley Quinn, Opie argues the Jewish aspect of their lives is almost always marginalized.

David Weil, who is Jewish, noted "casual" forms of anti-semitism taking place throughout his life, such as jokes about "Jews in ovens" and swastikas sprayed on his high school. Hunters is also far from the first piece of media to involve protagonists hunting down Nazis, as those have included films like The Odessa File (1974), Apt Pupil (1998), The Boys from Brazil (1978), and Marathon Man (1976), as well as content regarding Nazi zombies.

== Production ==
=== Development ===
I think as a young Jewish kid growing up on Long Island in New York, there are feelings of wanting to be powerful. You rarely see Jews depicted as superheroes; as having might and strength. They're often nebbishes or Woody Allen or very intellectual. But to have the power to reclaim your place and get justice for your ancestors is definitely a wish fulfillment. And that's what Hunters became.

— Hunters creator David Weil in an interview with Digital Spy

Creator David Weil's inspiration for Hunters was bedtime stories of World War II experiences told by his grandmother Sarah, who was a survivor of the Auschwitz camp Birkenau; the stories had a long-lasting impact on David because they were about "great good vs. terrifying evil" and had themes of "hope, courage and survival," elements he also noticed in comic book superhero stories he would read. Weil said he created Hunters because his grandparents were both Holocaust survivors, and described writing Meyer as "me meeting my grandfather for the first time, and that was a really beautiful and kind of powerful thing." Additional reasons for creating the show were a "lack of Jewish superheroes" in film and television, citing examples of films about Nazi Germany like Inglourious Basterds (2009) and Schindler's List (1993) having non-Jewish protagonists, and a desire to expose "hidden truths" and to help those "who've always felt persecuted, who linger with trauma and injustice" in response to "rising anti-Semistism, racism, xenophobia."

Despite the attachment of Get Out director Jordan Peele and Weil having an "80-page bible" of the show written, most buyers were wary of the project and refused to purchase it; the creator suggested that it was due to the series' premise of "a diverse band of 'others' kind of rising up and trying to reclaim power in some way" not being typical in mainstream entertainment. Amazon Studios head Jen Salke bought the series. Nikki Toscano joined as producer for its ambitious concept: "I think that the juxtaposition of the 1970s New York City with the Holocaust, with some of the levity and the humour, was certainly a challenge for us to balance throughout. But it was a challenge that I thought was an obstacle worth trying to get over."

On May 17, 2018, it was announced that Amazon Video had given the production a straight-to-series order for a first season consisting of ten episodes. Weil was set to executive produce alongside Jordan Peele, Tom Lesinski, Jenna Santoianni, and Win Rosenfeld. Weil was also expected to write for the series as well. Production companies involved with the series were slated to consist of Monkeypaw Productions and Sonar Entertainment. On August 7, 2018, it was announced that Nikki Toscano had joined the production as an executive producer and would also serve as co-showrunner alongside Weil. On August 3, 2020, Amazon renewed the series for a second and final season which was released on January 13, 2023.

=== Casting ===
On December 13, 2018, it was reported that Logan Lerman was in talks for a lead role in the series, Jonah Heidelbaum. On January 10, 2019, it was reported that Al Pacino was finalizing a deal for a starring role in the series. On February 7, 2019, it was reported that Jerrika Hinton, Dylan Baker, Lena Olin, Greg Austin, Catherine Tate, Tiffany Boone, Saul Rubinek, and Carol Kane were in various stages of negotiations to join the cast of the series. Four days later, it was announced that Boone had officially joined the cast. Josh Radnor was cast in March. In April 2019, Kate Mulvany, James LeGros, Ebony Obsidian, Caleb Emery, Henry Hunter Hall and Jeannie Berlin joined the cast of the series, with Mulvany joining as a series regular. On April 5, 2021, Jennifer Jason Leigh was cast as a lead for the second season.

It's been noted that while not all the Jewish characters on the show are played by Jewish actors and not all the hunters are Jews, all Jewish actors out of the main cast play Jewish characters. Outside the main cast, some Jewish actors have played Jewish characters (for example, actor Zack Schor, who mentioned his survivor grandparents as the reason why he was drawn to the role of the younger Meyer Offerman, a Polish Jew in a Nazi camp), while others have played non-Jews (such as Jewish actor Kenneth Tigar who plays a Nazi).

=== Filming ===
The bowling scene was Austin's audition scene as well as the first sequence he filmed for the series, and a continuous shot where his character talks to the congressman before bowling a strike was done within one take.

== Themes and visuals ==
You should read the Torah more. It's the original comic book.

— Meyer Offerman

According to Weil, "the purpose of this show is an allegorical tale in many ways, to draw the parallels between the ’30s and ’40s in Europe and the ’70s in the States and especially today with the racism and anti-Semitism and xenophobia, the likes of which we haven’t seen in decades."

As David Weil put it, "Hunters is about a group of people who are so rarely portrayed as superheroes" and incorporates iconography to show the Jewish characters as superheroes that reclaim their power; an example is the use of yellow coloring on the costumes and weapons of the hunters as a way to reclaim the color of the yellow badge as the Jews'. Weil also went for a similar heroism in the prisoners in the Auschwitz camp flashbacks.

Genre-wise, Hunters is a mix of several styles: "a harrowing remembrance of the suffering of the Holocaust, a satisfying revenge fantasy, a sensational period piece, and a dark comedy," labeled The Verge's Joshua Rivera. Ben Travers of IndieWire categorized it as a black comedy thriller that's "extremely violent and extremely silly; it respects the drama inherent to any Holocaust story while still allowing fans to enjoy the fictionalized quest for vengeance. For every conversation about justice and vengeance, morality and responsibility, right and wrong, there's a fake ad about spotting Nazis or a dance sequence set to 'Staying Alive.'" Matthew Gilbert of The Boston Globe compared its comedy and look to the works of the Coen brothers and Quentin Tarantino. Prahlad Srihari, a Firstpost critic, also used one of Tarantino's works to describe it as a combination of the director's film Inglourious Basterds (2009) and Steven Spielberg's Munich (2005). Several 1970s exploitation genres are imitated in the show, such as kung fu, Blaxploitation, Jewsploitation, and torture porn.

Fighting individuals who committed serious crimes with actions like violence is a common moral dilemma the titular hunters deal with; Rubinek explained that this was important, as the message of the Jewish folklore of the golem is that "monster which grows violent and protects the Jews, also turns violent inappropriately and has to be put down." Weil stated that the main question of the story is, "If you hunt monsters, do you risk becoming a monster yourself?" "Some of Hunters' biggest thematic questions revolve around whether ends justify means or if the pursuit of vengeance risks corrupting those who seek it," Rivera put it more specifically. For Jonah he's "pushed and pulled between asserting himself as a hunter and, if not empathizing with the hunted, believing there's a more humane way of holding them accountable. Is Jonah naive and soft for being appalled by the team's tactics? Or is he exercising better moral judgment because he's lived outside the dehumanizing conditions they faced?" wrote Travers.

Toscano explained that she and the writers, while not sympathizing with the Nazis, were trying to portray them as humans rather than caricatures, realizing there was a "spectrum of evil that we’re dealing with. There is one extreme [and then] there are other Nazis that have various explanations: ‘I was following orders; I was as (sic) kid'".

References to pop culture are used that relates to this moral conflict; for instance, in a conversation between Jonah and his two friends after seeing Star Wars (1977), Jonah jokingly hypothesizes Darth Vader is after the Jedi rebels because he was raised to believe they would "bomb his parents, behead his friends, kidnap all the hot Galactic chicks for lightsaber orgies. Vader doesn't get up every day looking to destroy the galaxy. He gets up every morning believing he needs to save it." Jonah's friends counter-respond that Vader is still a killer despite good intentions, and Jonah responds back by saying heroes like Batman and Superman are the same way.

A chess board is also repeatedly used in the show's imagery (including in its intro) to present good vs. evil battles as a complicated game.

To differentiate from most other shows with a historical context that, to Toscano and Weil, felt "like a history lesson," the two went for a "comic book" style, with a mix of shots with "poppy" colors and shots with de-saturated, "grounded" colors; Weil explained that this was meant to present a message that what "seems like comic book" ends up "scintillating[ly] real." Generally, sequences set in the 1970s have a flashier color palette, while scenes in the Auschwitz camps have more muted colors. Gomez-Rejon came up with the idea of using windows as panels for the show. According to Lerman, the main character works at a comic book shop and one of the stories' major themes are the moral differences between comic books and real-life; for instance, "you have to be bad" instead of a superhero to defeat villains, which is Pacino's view when he trains Jonah into becoming a hunter.

As Film Inquiry describe Hunters' variety of tones, "for every naturalistic colloquy, there's a bit of sparkle and levity by compiling specious footage (usually in the form of a television ad) involving the interracial and intergenerational crew of Nazi-fighters. (At one point in episode 3, Logan Lerman breaks out in a musical number.)"

== Reception ==
Upon the release of its first season, Hunters received mixed reviews, with praise for its premise, messages, action sequences, and performances, but criticism for its story-telling, inconsistent tone, pacing, historical inaccuracies, and conclusion. A favorable review summarized the show as "audacious, tonally complex, not always in control of its message, visually arresting, and, particularly in its grim flashbacks to the brutalities and the courage in the death camps, moving," while one of its harshest detractors labeled it "uneven, awkward...often dull," and "sort of yucky."

The first season has a 65% approval rating with 112 reviews on Rotten Tomatoes, with an average rating of 6.1/10 and the following critical consensus: "Propelled by a strong cast and even stronger sense of justice, Hunters' stylish first season doesn't always hit the mark, but when it does, it strikes pulpy paydirt." Metacritic gave the first season a score of 54 out of 100 based on 41 critics, indicating "mixed or average reviews". Most of the initial reviews were for the first five episodes.

The second season has a 75% approval rating with 20 reviews on Rotten Tomatoes, with an average rating of 6.6/10 and the following critical consensus: "While it never realizes its full potential as a revenge fantasy for real historical atrocity, Hunters tracks down a satisfying enough conclusion in this second and final season." Metacritic gave the second season a score of 68 out of 100 based on 6 critics, indicating "generally favorable reviews".

The lack of development of the Hunters was a frequent criticism. Wrote Tom Long of The Detroit News, "we’re introduced to our heroes — who inexplicably include an Asian man and black women — at which point we wait around to see their super-skills. Never happens. Five episodes in none of these people seem all that good at anything." Srihari criticized Biff Simpson not being the main antagonist instead of the Colonel, "who is more Cruella de Vil than exceptionally evil, despite the season-ending pay-off," while Rivera criticized the character of Jonah, feeling that all his conflicts, such as those in his personal life, are only to serve the story: "This makes all of his big moments feel like they occur in a vacuum — especially when he’s paired up with the other Hunters."

A common praise was the cast, including for actors like Pacino, Kane and Rubinek and Olin. Travers praised the performers of the hunters, highlighting Rubinek and Kane, as well as Hinton, Baker, Olin, and the "affecting and fun" Pacino, but called Lerman and his character Jonah nothing more than an "audience stand-in" that "occasionally forgets to get off the couch and move around." Gilbert found Berlin's presence memorable and highlighted the restraint of Pacino: "He brings a lovely gentleness to the role, too, most evident in the fatherly attentions he gives to the confused, grieving, and newly mobilized Jonah. He sees generational wrath in the young man’s fury, and he fosters it." He also called Lerman "good enough if somewhat one-dimensional as Jonah."

The tonal dissonance and mashing of styles turned off some reviewers. Wrote Gilbert, "the leaps from the kitschy shag-carpeted world of bell-bottoms to the spare cruelties of the camps, and from action comedy to human tragedy, are a lot." Verne Gay of Newsday opined that while Hunters was successful as a genre show, it was an "impossible balancing act" to make it both that and a "personal tribute" to those who died in the Nazi camps with its flashback sequences. Tom Long of The Detroit News wrote that, "Tonally it careens madly from sincere to silly, gory to glib," and when it came to its use of pastiche styles, "It’s as if someone took notes while watching a marathon of Quentin Tarantino movies, getting all the bits and pieces without understanding why they worked." ArtsATL was disgusted by the use of comic book references and cliches in a show with "the genocide of 6 million people in World War II" as one of its major themes.

Reviews debated Hunters' revenge fantasy premise and Nazi subject matter, specifically, in 3AW 's words, "the oft-raised issue about exploiting one of the most horrific man-made events in history for our entertainment. Can the show be seen as an indirect tribute to the work of Nazi-hunter Simon Wiesenthal? Or is it just bad taste? Can it be both?" Gilbert was appreciative of the "bold" inclusion of "Nazis into a broad genre-tinged entertainment," as it's also "part of the origin story of Golden Age superhero comic books themselves," and suggested it would start conversation between viewers. Other critics, even those who were engaged with the content, unfavorably opined its premise and revenge message made it a B-grade series; Srihari, in particular, categorized it as "an exploitation film that has invaded an overlong comic book movie" and that "the violence brings together the victimiser and victimised in a punishing embrace." Film Inquiry's "Does that make it right? Of course not. Is it fun to watch? In all honesty, not really. It is, however, extremely aware and extremely responsive in how it tinkers with history by adding a fair amount of pathos."

A positive review by Travers, who stated that the show's violence and "[allow] for a fanciful level of wish fulfillment, as well as a compelling action narrative," claimed they led the serious themes to feel non-relevant. Long dismissed Hunters as "a wildly uneven, superficial, comic book-type treatment" of the "particularly sick and unfortunately still-relevant dynamic" of American Nazism, attributing the problem to the writing being "black-and-white" and filled with stereotypes.

Srihari suggested that the series should have used "subtle and subversive" methods of dehumanizing Nazis, such as in the flashback scene where the Jewish prisoners play the Jewish folk song "Hava Nagila" instead of music by composer Richard Wagner as a Nazi officer commands them to. He also argued the comical torturing devices of the officers, such as the human chess board and the singing competition, "stops being disturbing after a while as the mayhem turns into monotony." Stover similarly opined that "the series wallows in its own jarring material to the point of lassitude."

Rivera named the show's straightforward moments its best, such as the flashbacks in the fourth episode of a couple trying to escape the camp. Long was harsh on the flashbacks, however, suggesting that they're "supposed to provide motivation but often just [look] like Jews being tortured in concentration camps." The Mary Sue's Sara Clements, although agreeing with the criticisms of the flashbacks, also stated that they are essential, as "they emphasize a simple fact: We must know and must not forget what happened during the Holocaust. Even when there are no survivors left to tell their stories, we must continue in their place."

The series has received some criticism from the Auschwitz-Birkenau State Museum due to inaccurate use of the Auschwitz Concentration Camp. The scene depicting prisoners being forced to participate in a game of human chess was called out as "dangerous foolishness and caricature". The museum was also concerned that the show "welcomes future deniers". Director of the USC Shoah Foundation Stephen D. Smith heavily criticized the show and concluded that "Amazon must not renew it for a second season."

In a statement, series creator David Weil, the grandson of Holocaust survivors, responded to the criticism and spoke to wanting to tell a story about the Holocaust without borrowing from a specific survivor's real life or experience without their permission. He said, "It is true that Nazis perpetrated widespread and extreme acts of sadism and torture – and even incidents of cruel 'games' – against their victims. I simply did not want to depict those specific, real acts of trauma ... I did not want to misrepresent a real person or borrow from a specific moment in an actual person’s life. That was the responsibility that weighed on me every night and every morning for years, while writing, producing, and editing this show."

Rubinek also responded to criticisms about the show's violence, explaining that it was warning the viewers about the negative consequences of revenge violence, not promoting it: "If the theme of the show was just violence – yes, maybe they'd have a point... But it's not just about that. It's about the consequences of it."

== Awards and nominations ==
Year	Award	Category	Nominee(s)	Result	Ref.
2020	Black Reel Awards for Television	Outstanding Directing, Drama Series	Millicent Shelton (for "(Ruth 1:16)")	Nominated	
2020	Black Reel Awards for Television	Outstanding Writing, Drama Series	Zakiyyah Alexander (for "(Ruth 1:16)")	Nominated	
2021	Critics' Choice Super Awards	Best Action Series	Hunters	Nominated	
2021	Critics' Choice Super Awards	Best Actor in an Action Series	Logan Lerman	Nominated	
2021	Critics' Choice Super Awards	Best Actor in an Action Series	Al Pacino	Nominated	
2021	Golden Globe Awards	Best Actor – Television Series Drama	Al Pacino	Nominated	
