= Jose Molina (writer) =

American screenwriter (born 1971)

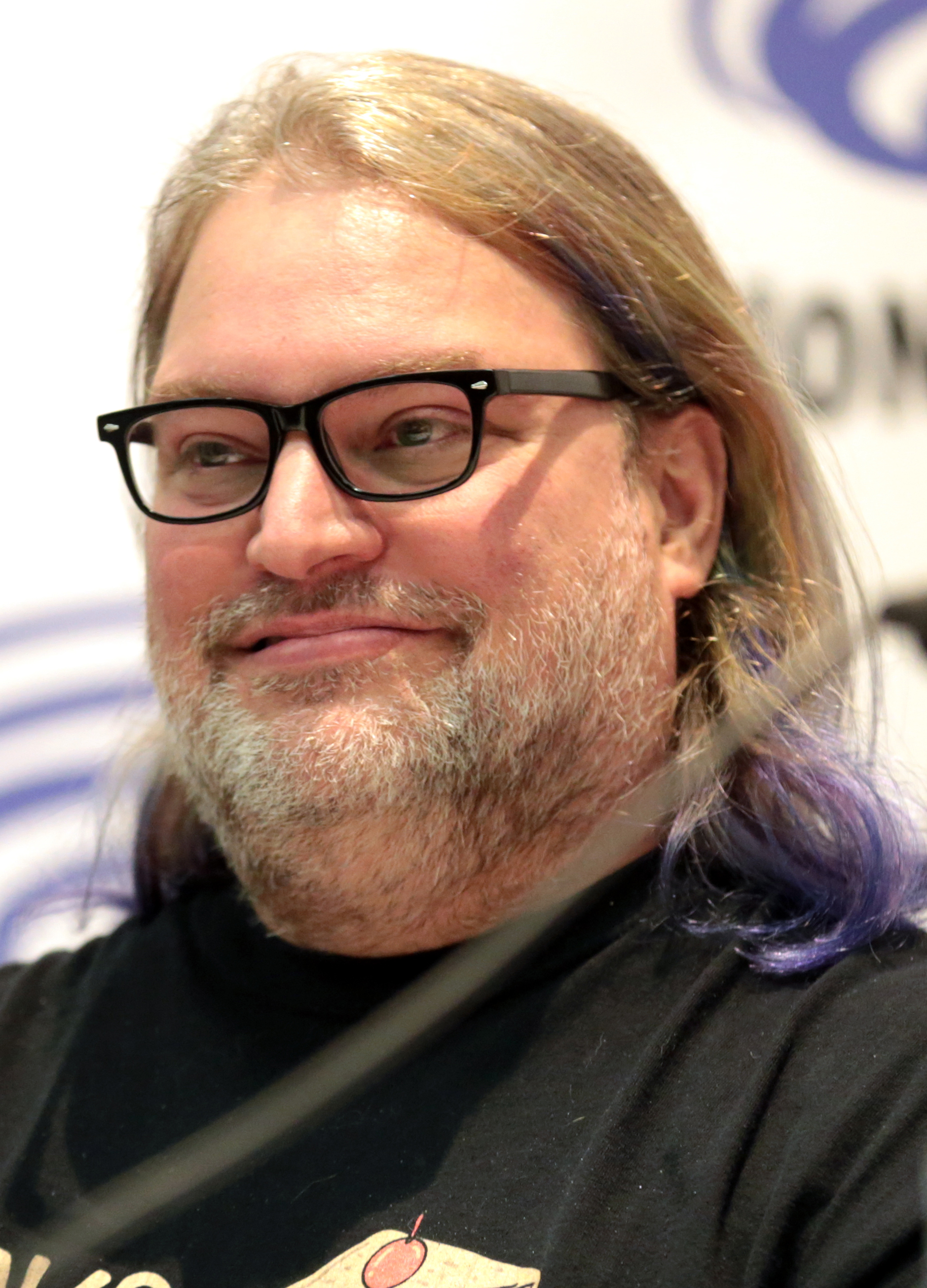
- Jose Molina at the 2017 WonderCon
- Born: 1971 (age 54–55); San Juan, Puerto Rico
- Occupations: Screenwriter, producer, podcaster
- Writing career
- Genres: Science fiction, Mystery

Jose Molina, born in 1971 in San Juan, Puerto Rico, is a television producer and screenwriter. He wrote the episodes "Trash" and "Ariel" for the American TV show Firefly, and multiple episodes for Dark Angel.

== Education ==
Molina attended Yale University (Pierson College, class of 1993), where he successfully applied for a student internship with the Academy of Television Arts and Sciences by submitting a spec script for Star Trek: The Next Generation.

== Career ==
Following Firefly, Molina worked on Law & Order: Special Victims Unit, earning the 2006 American Latino Media Arts Award for "Outstanding Script for a Television Drama or Comedy" for the episode "Alien". The Official Firefly Visual Companion #3, "Still Flying", released in May 2010, features a short story written by Molina. He wrote the episodes "Famous Last Words" and "Suicide Squeeze" for the television series Castle, on which he served as Co-Executive Producer, a title Molina carried into the first season of the Syfy original series Haven.

Molina followed his stint in genre cable with a return to in-network genre, becoming one of the head writers on the Steven Spielberg-produced series Terra Nova, which aired for 13 episodes in the fall at Fox. After the cancellation of Terra Nova, Molina moved briefly to NBC's rookie fairy-tale drama Grimm before landing on the flagship of The CW Network, The Vampire Diaries. More recent projects include La Brea, Legacies and Blood & Treasure .

Alongside Javier Grillo-Marxuach, he is also the co-host of the Children of Tendu Podcast, a weekly series offering advice for getting into the television industry.

== Filmography ==
Year	Title	Credited as		Notes
Year	Title	Writer	Producer	Notes
1999	Strange World	Yes		Writer (1 episode)
2000–2002	Dark Angel	Yes		Writer (8 episodes); story editor
2002–2003	Firefly	Yes		Writer (2 episodes); executive story editor
2004–2006	Law & Order: Special Victims Unit	Yes	Yes	Writer (6 episodes); story editor, executive story editor; co-producer, producer
2006–2008	Without a Trace	Yes	Yes	Writer (5 episodes); supervising producer; co-executive producer
2009–2010	Castle	Yes	Yes	Writer (2 episodes); co-executive producer
2010	Haven	Yes	Yes	Writer (2 episodes); co-executive producer
2011	Star Wars: The Clone Wars	Yes		Writer (3 episodes)
2011	Terra Nova	Yes	Yes	Writer (1 episode); co-executive producer
2012	Grimm	Yes	Yes	Writer (1 episode); co-executive producer
2012–2013	The Vampire Diaries	Yes	Yes	Writer (4 episodes); co-executive producer
2013	Sleepy Hollow	Yes	Yes	Writer (2 episodes); co-executive producer
2015–2016	Agent Carter	Yes	Yes	Writer (2 episodes); co-executive producer
2017–2018	The Tick	Yes	Yes	Writer (3 episodes); co-executive producer
2019	Weird City	Yes	Yes	Writer (1 episode); executive producer/showrunner
2021	La Brea	Yes	Yes	Writer (1 episode); co-executive producer
2021-2022	Legacies	Yes	Yes	Writer (2 episodes); co-executive producer
2022	Blood & Treasure	Yes	Yes	Writer (2 episodes); consulting producer
2026	The Boroughs	Yes	Yes	Writer (At least 1 ep);co-executive producer
