= Kicks (film) =

2016 American adventure film

- Theatrical release poster
- Directed by: Justin Tipping
- Written by: Justin Tipping; Joshua Beirne-Golden
- Produced by: Joshua Astrachan; Joshua Beirne-Golden; Michael Angelo Covino; David Kaplan; Geoffrey Quan; Adele Romanski; Erik Rommesmo
- Starring: Jahking Guillory; Christopher Jordan Wallace; Christopher Meyer; Kofi Siriboe; Mahershala Ali; Nessma Ismail; Molly Shaiken
- Cinematography: Michael Ragen
- Edited by: Dominic LaPerriere; Tomas Vengris
- Music by: Brian Reitzell
- Production companies: Animal Kingdom; Bow and Arrow Entertainment; Bystorm Films; Hidden Empire Film Group; Marlowe Pictures; Mott Street Pictures; Through Films; Unbundled Underground
- Distributed by: Focus World
- Release dates: April 14, 2016 (Tribeca Film Festival); September 9, 2016 (United States)
- Running time: 87 minutes
- Country: United States
- Language: English
- Budget: $10 million
- Box office: $150,191

Kicks is a 2016 American adventure film directed by Justin Tipping in his directorial debut, and written by Tipping and Joshua Beirne-Golden. The film stars Jahking Guillory, Christopher Jordan Wallace, Christopher Meyer, Kofi Siriboe, Mahershala Ali and Molly Shaiken. The film was released on September 9, 2016, by Focus World.

== Plot ==
Fifteen-year-old Brandon longs for a pair of the freshest sneakers that money can buy, specifically the Bred Air Jordan 1s, assuming that merely having them on his feet will help him escape the reality of being poor, neglected by the opposite sex and picked on by everyone – even his best friends Rico and Albert.

He visits a local store and finds that a brand new pair cost $350. He gathers the money by using his savings and by selling candy bars to people on the streets. As he continues to gather the amount he meets a guy in the neighborhood with a car full of "exclusive" sneakers. Upon seeing his desired pair of shoes, Brandon seizes the opportunity to purchase them for $150. Brandon heads home with his new shoes and anticipates wearing them. He wears them the next day and shows them off to Rico and Albert who fail to believe that he got the pair for only $150. He recites a fictitious story to them and seemingly convinces them into believing it. They head to the local basketball court and meet two girls, one of whom takes an interest in Brandon and invites him to hang out later. Believing that his Jordans have already started to "work their magic", he agrees and blows off hanging out with his friends in order to get ready for his first date.

However, on his way home Brandon encounters Flaco, a ruthless gangster and his crew. They gang up on Brandon beating him up while recording him and steal his shoes. Brandon ends up depressed by the events and Rico and Albert add fuel to the fire by making fun of his loss to which he retaliates. He swears to get his sneakers back and heads off with his friends in hopes of finding information of Flaco's whereabouts. Flaco is such bad news that everybody warns Brandon off, tells him to let the shoes go, but Brandon declares, "They're not just shoes. They're fucking J's." He meets one of the gang members in the park and throws a basketball at him which knocks the member over. He, Rico and Albert leave and Brandon tells the member to warn Flaco.

Brandon eventually turns to his uncle Marlon, who tells him that he no longer lives "that kind" of life and that he won't risk lives nor go back to prison over a pair of shoes. Dissatisfied, Brandon leaves but not before taking his uncle's gun from a nearby bedroom to take matters into his own hands. He speaks to his cousins outside who assure him that if they stay longer they'll definitely run into Flaco. They group heads off to a house where they smoke weed, drink and do drugs. Brandon hooks up with one of the girls at the house and soon leaves with everyone in hopes of finally reaching Flaco.

Meanwhile, Flaco is shown bullying another kid in the neighborhood and steals his earphones. He walks to his vehicle and places them in the trunk along with Brandon's shoes and a few other things that he had stolen. He reaches his house and gives the sneakers to his son. Flaco and his son play in the basketball court while his son wears the shoes. He is then seen at his house with his gang members doing drugs and dancing with girls while his son watches close by.

Brandon, Rico and Albert eventually infiltrate Flaco's house by tricking his son. Brandon manages to grab his shoes but Flaco sees them and tries to get them back. Brandon manages to flee and abandons his friends. Flaco grabs Albert and starts beating him up but is then knocked out by Rico. The two escape and along the way encounter Brandon who gloats about getting his shoes back. Rico pushes him against the fence and makes him realize that their lives are in danger because he abandoned them all for a pair of Jordans. They leave Brandon alone and head off to get Albert's wounds treated.

Upon realizing his mistake, Brandon heads to Uncle Marlon's house and leaves the gun next to him. Uncle Marlon tells him "That ain't how it works. Once you start something you gotta see it to the end." He tells Brandon to keep the gun because Flaco will definitely go after him. Meanwhile, Flaco is seen with his son in the same store Brandon was in at the beginning of the film and buys his son a new pair of shoes. In the car, he tells his son that they are going after the shoes in order to teach him about standing up for himself and not allowing anyone to get away with things.

Brandon travels in a bus and sees another person with the same sneakers realizing that his "exclusive" shoes weren't really exclusive at all. He places the gun in the Jordan shoebox and throws it away, taking Uncle Marlon's advice from before into consideration. He meets up with Rico and Albert in the basketball court, gifting Albert a box of condoms and Rico some juice. They warn him about Flaco. As they walk home, Flaco finds them and chases them down with his son catching up from behind. He places a gun on Brandon's neck in order to teach him a lesson. Brandon knocks him over with his skateboard and kicks him in the face continuously before grabbing the gun and placing it near his face. Brandon looks at Flaco's son and tosses the gun aside deciding not to pull the trigger. Flaco's son grabs the gun and refuses to give it to Flaco so that he does not murder Brandon and go to jail. Flaco wakes up and punches Brandon repeatedly, before deciding to let him keep his shoes, grabs his son and heading home.

Rico and Albert arrive and help Brandon walk. As they help him he decides to walk on his own. He climbs the steps slowly with his friends having finally faced his fears, realizing his own strengths and feeling proud as a man.

== Cast ==
- Jahking Guillory as Brandon
- Christopher Jordan Wallace as Albert
- Christopher Meyer as Rico
- Kofi Siriboe as Flaco
- Mahershala Ali as Marlon
- Molly Shaiken as Astronaut
- Donté Clark as Ryan

== Release ==
The film premiered at the Tribeca Film Festival on April 14, 2016. The film was released on September 9, 2016, by Focus World.

== Response ==
=== Box office ===
Kicks grossed $150,191 in the United States and Canada, and $0 in other territories, against a production budget of $10 million.

=== Critical reception ===
On review aggregator Rotten Tomatoes, the film holds an approval rating of 88%, based on 40 reviews, with an average rating of 6.9/10. The website's critics consensus reads: "Kicks might suffer from a few frayed laces, but this street-level coming-of-age story has heart, humor, and style to spare." On Metacritic, the film has a weighted average score of 69 out of 100, based on 14 critics, indicating "generally favorable" reviews.
