= Justin Tipping =

American television and film director, screenwriter, and executive producer

- Occupations: Television director; Film director; Screenwriter; Executive producer
- Years active: 2016–present
- Notable work: Kicks; Flatbush Misdemeanors; Joe vs. Carole

Justin Tipping is an American television and film director, screenwriter, and executive producer best known for his work on Kicks (2016), Flatbush Misdemeanors (2021), and Joe vs. Carole (2022).

== Career ==
In 2016, Tipping began his career by serving as the director of Kicks. In November 2018, he signed on to direct and co-write a film based on the Harbinger comics. In 2019, he directed episodes of Black Monday, The Chi, and Dear White People. In the same year, he was in discussions to direct the Marvel Cinematic Universe film Shang-Chi and the Legend of the Ten Rings. In 2020, he directed episodes of Dare Me and Twenties. In 2021, he gained notability from directing episodes of Joe vs. Carole, Run the World, and Flatbush Misdemeanors. Tipping co-wrote and directed the 2025 sports horror film Him for Jordan Peele's Monkeypaw Productions.

== Filmography ==
Film

Year	Title	Director	Writer	Ref.
2016	Kicks	Yes	Yes	
2025	Him	Yes	Yes	

Co-producer

- Lowriders (2016)

Television

Year	Title	Director	Executive producer	Notes	Ref.
2018–19	The Chi	Yes	No	2 episodes	
2019	Black Monday	Yes	No	2 episodes	
2019	Dear White People	Yes	No	Episode "Chapter IV"	
2020	Dare Me	Yes	No	Episode "Containment"	
2020	Twenties	Yes	Yes	4 episodes	
2021	Flatbush Misdemeanors	Yes	Yes	3 episodes	
2021	Run the World	Yes	No	3 episodes	
2022	Joe vs. Carole	Yes	No	5 episodes	
