= Quiet Part Loud =

Horror podcast by Monkeypaw Productions

- Genre: Horror podcast
- Language: English

Creative team
- Created by: Jordan Peele; Mimi O'Donnell; Win Rosenfeld
- Written by: Clay McLeod Chapman; Mac Rogers
- Directed by: Mimi O'Donnell

Cast and voices
- Voices: Tracy Letts; Christina Hendricks; Taran Killam; Arian Moayed; Nikohl Boosheri; Milly Shapiro; Alfredo Narciso; Krish Marwah; Krysta Rodriguez; Heidi Armbruster; Dariush Kashani; Ali Louis Bourzgui; Marwan Salama; Pooya Mohseni

Production
- Production: Amy McLeish; Geoff Foster; Katie Pastore
- Length: 20–25 minutes

Publication
- No. of seasons: 1
- No. of episodes: 12
- Original release: November 15, 2022
- Provider: Monkeypaw Productions; Gimlet Media; Spotify

Quiet Part Loud is a horror podcast produced by Monkeypaw Productions and Gimlet Media. The executive producers of the show include Jordan Peele, Mimi O'Donnell, and Win Rosenfeld. The show stars Tracy Letts as Rick Egan, a right-wing radio host who is investigating what happened to some Muslim teenagers eight years after the September 11 attacks. All 12 episodes were released on November 15, 2022.

== Premise ==
The story is set before the presidency of Donald Trump and follows a right-wing radio host named Rick Egan. After the September 11 attacks, Egan began spreading xenophobic conspiracies about some missing Muslim teenagers, which led to him losing his platform. Eight years after his disgrace, Egan is searching for work on the convention circuit when he meets a woman who provides information about one of the Muslim teenagers reappearing. Egan decides to follow the lead and investigate what really happened. In the process, Egan runs into a demonic sound monster called "The Blank" that feeds off of the hatred, divisiveness, and conspiracy-obsessed messages that radio hosts like Egan broadcast to the world. Egan makes a Faustian bargain with "The Blank" in an attempt to be absolved.

== Production ==
The podcast was produced by Monkeypaw Productions and Gimlet Media and was initially a Spotify exclusive show, though was made available on other platforms in March 2023. The podcast was written by Clay McLeod Chapman and Mac Rogers and directed by Mimi O'Donnell. The podcast was executive produced by Jordan Peele, Mimi O'Donnell, and Win Rosenfeld with production credits for Amy McLeish, Geoff Foster, and Katie Pastore. The podcast's trailer was released on November 10, 2022, and all 12 episodes of the podcast were released on November 15, 2022. Monkeypaw Productions had been experimenting with different mediums and had just completed their first stop motion film Wendell & Wild. Peele commented on his desire to work in an audio-only format saying that "By stripping horror of all visuals, you can just focus on conjuring dread and unease in your listener's ear on this intimate and visceral level." According to the production team, the podcast will use "immersive audio and sound design". The podcast is a continuation of Peele's tendency to weave social commentary into his horror narratives, which often falls into the genre of social horror.

=== Cast and characters ===
- Tracy Letts as Rick Egan
- Nikohl Boosheri as Noor
- Christina Hendricks as Allied Alice
- Taran Killam as The Blank
- Milly Shapiro as Becca
- Arian Moayed as Tariq
- Alfredo Narciso as Vernon
- Krish Marwah as Khalil
- Krysta Rodriguez as Gaby
- Heidi Armbruster as Nicole
- Dariush Kashani as Imam
- Ali Louis Bourzgui as Hassan
- Marwan Salama as Yusef
- Pooya Mohseni as Fatima
