= Charlie Sanders (actor) =

American actor

- Born: Charles Henry Sanders III; August 22, 1979 (age 47); Minneapolis, Minnesota, U.S.
- Occupation: Actor/Writer/Comedian
- Television: Key & Peele, Weird City, Death Valley
- Awards: WGA Award, Peabody Award, Emmy Award

Charles Henry Sanders (born August 22, 1979) is an American actor, comedian, director, producer, songwriter and Writers Guild Award–winning writer best known for starring as Officer Joe Stubeck in the MTV comedy-action series Death Valley, writing on all five seasons of Key & Peele and creating the YouTube Premium series Weird City. He previously hosted the podcast "Bald Talk" on iHeartMedia with comedian and actor Brian Huskey.

== Early life ==
The eldest of three brothers, Sanders was born in Minneapolis, Minnesota, and grew up in Saint Paul, where he graduated from St. Paul Central High School in 1998. While in high school he participated in Central Touring Theatre Company (alongside fellow comedians Nick Swardson and Colton Dunn) and the school swim team and later performed at ComedySportz in Minneapolis.

Sanders worked at Bryant-Lake Bowl doing sound for comedy shows, while briefly attending the University of Minnesota. He then moved to New York City in 2001 where he began regularly performing improvisational comedy at the Upright Citizens Brigade Theater (UCBT), where he was a member of the improv groups "Police Chief Rumble" and "Reuben Williams". In 2004 he and his improv team "Police Chief Rumble" won "Best Sketch Group" at the Emerging Comics of New York Awards. Sanders later performed at the UCBT's Los Angeles theater with "Shitty Jobs", "Facebook Improv" and "Asssscat".

== Career ==
As an actor, Sanders has appeared as a sketch regular on Late Night with Conan O'Brien for several years and has appeared in films such as When in Rome and Cedar Rapids. Sanders starred as Officer Joe Stubeck in the MTV comedy-action Death Valley and has made recurring appearances on comedy programs such as Funny or Die Presents, Childrens Hospital, The Office, The League, Arrested Development and the Mr. Show follow-up W/ Bob & David. For a number of years he was part of the sketch-comedy trio "The Buffoons" with comedians Bobby Moynihan and Eugene Cordero. The trio performed regularly at the Upright Citizens Brigade Theater and also at Montreal's "Just For Laughs" Comedy Festival in 2007. Sanders also performed his one-man show "Minnesota Muslim" for several years, which was praised in Time Out NY and New York Magazine.

As a writer, Sanders has written for sketch-comedy programs such MTV's Human Giant and was a writer and co-producer for all five seasons of the acclaimed Emmy-winning Comedy Central series Key & Peele for which he won a Peabody Award. Sanders also wrote the Funny or Die produced short film "The Big Dog", which he starred in alongside Bob Odenkirk and Rich Sommer. Along with Jordan Peele created the YouTube Premium show Weird City, of which he wrote every episode, executive produced and starred on as Girth Haddock. He is a winner of the WGA Award for writing The Blake Shelton Not-So-Family Christmas special.
