= Ian Cooper (artist) =

American visual artist and creative director of Monkeypaw Productions

- Born: 1978 (age 47–48); New York City, U.S.
- Occupations: Visual artist; film producer; academic
- Years active: 2017–present

Ian Cooper (born 1978) is an American visual artist, film producer, and academic, best known for his collaborations with Jordan Peele. He currently serves as a creative director of Monkeypaw Productions.

== Career ==
=== Visual Art ===
Cooper has had solo exhibitions in galleries and museums throughout the United States and abroad. His "mixed-media sculptures" have been written about in The New York Times, Artforum, among others. His work is held in the permanent collections of the Whitney Museum of American Art and the Pérez Art Museum.

Cooper's art has been described as "obsessed with the dark side of adolescence and with how the transition from youth to adulthood is acted out in a variety of aesthetic statements." Cooper's sculptures of "institutionalized surfaces" "filtered through the aesthetics of his 1980s childhood, pervert the forms and features of K-12." Works have featured references to ballet barres, institutional projection screens, and a "penetrated matador's cape." Writing about his work, Artforum critic Alex Javonovich stated that Cooper's sculptures are "sensuous yet sterile" and "frantic and batty."

Cooper's artistic style can be seen reflected in his film work, and themes and elements from his exhibiting art career have appeared in his contributions to films, including ballet barres in scenes from Jordan Peele's Us.

=== Film ===
In 2017, Cooper was brought on as the Creative Director of Monkeypaw Productions, as well as becoming Jordan Peele's producing partner. Since joining the company, Cooper has produced the following feature films: Peele's 2019's Us; Nia DaCosta's Candyman (2022); and Peele's 2022 film Nope.

==== Us ====
During filming, Ian Cooper went to great lengths to ensure key plot points weren't leaked early, in one instance telling passersby that the crew was filming a Verizon commercial.

==== Candyman ====
Cooper spoke highly about the unity of the cast and crew throughout the filming process. Reviews of the film praised the writing, directing, and social critiques.

==== Nope ====
In 2022, he produced Monkeypaw's latest film Nope. The cast included Daniel Kaluuya, Keke Palmer, and Steven Yeun.

=== Academia ===
Before entering the film world, Ian Cooper was on the sculpture faculty at New York University's Steinhardt School Department of Arts & Arts Professions from 2005 to 2017. Cooper also served as the lead faculty of the Senior Studio Program and was the program coordinator for the Senior Honors Studio program across the first three years of its inception. During his tenure at NYU, Cooper co-created the NYU Curatorial Collaborative which remains a capstone experience to the thesis program, as well as a cross-departmental program that unites a select group of curatorial graduate students from The Institute of Fine Art with a group of jury-selected undergraduate visual artists from the Steinhardt Studio Art program. The initiative "fosters interdisciplinary teamwork that prepares both the artists and art historians for future projects in their respective fields" and results in a series of exhibitions annually, held at the 80WSE Gallery. Cooper also partnered with artist Sara Greenberger Rafferty to teach a Cartoon Logic course at Michigan's prestigious Ox-Bow School of Art.
