= That's Showbiz Baby: the Tour =

2025–2026 concert tour by Jade Thirlwall

- Tour by Jade
- Promotional poster for international dates
- Location: Europe; North America
- Associated album: That's Showbiz Baby!
- Start date: 7 October 2025
- End date: 18 March 2026
- No. of shows: 38
- Supporting acts: Adam Theo; Say Now

That's Showbiz Baby: the Tour was the first headlining concert tour held by the English singer Jade, in support of her debut solo studio album, That's Showbiz Baby! (2025). The tour commenced on 7 October 2025 in Dublin, Ireland, and it concluded on 18 March 2026 in Hamburg, Germany.

== Announcements ==
On 14 May 2025, in connection to the album's announcement, Jade revealed a concert tour of the same name, with dates in the United Kingdom and Ireland, commencing on 7 October 2025. On 22 September 2025, during an interview on Late Night with Seth Meyers, Jade announced the tour would expand to include North America and mainland Europe, with the new legs scheduled for February and March 2026, respectively. At the time of the announcement, only the dates were revealed, with further details such as ticket sales yet to be disclosed. A day later, the dates were announced on all socials.

DJ Adam Theo was announced as supporting act for concerts in Ireland and the UK. British girl group Say Now served as support act during the 22 October concert.

== Set list ==
This set list is from the concert in Dublin on 7 October 2025.

1. "FUFN (Fuck You for Now)"
2. "Headache"
3. "Before You Break My Heart"
4. "Unconditional"
5. "Fantasy"
6. "Self Saboteur"
7. "Lip Service"
8. "Plastic Box"
9. "Glitch"
10. "Frozen"
11. "Natural at Disaster"
12. "Midnight Cowboy"
13. "Wasabi"
14. "Gossip"
15. "It Girl"
16. "Silent Disco"
17. "Angel of My Dreams"

== Tour dates ==
List of 2025 concerts
Date (2025)	City	Country	Venue	Supporting acts
7 October	Dublin	Ireland	3Olympia Theatre	Adam Theo
8 October	Dublin	Ireland	3Olympia Theatre	Adam Theo
9 October	Belfast	Northern Ireland	Ulster Hall	Adam Theo
11 October	Brighton	England	Brighton Dome	Adam Theo
12 October	Manchester	England	O_{2} Victoria Warehouse	Adam Theo
13 October	Glasgow	Scotland	O_{2} Academy Glasgow	Adam Theo
15 October	Leeds	England	O_{2} Academy Leeds	Adam Theo
16 October	Birmingham	England	O_{2} Academy Birmingham	Adam Theo
18 October	Newcastle	England	O_{2} City Hall Newcastle	Adam Theo
19 October	London	England	Roundhouse	Adam Theo
21 October	Bournemouth	England	O_{2} Academy Bournemouth	Adam Theo
22 October	London	England	Roundhouse	Adam Theo; Say Now
23 October	Newcastle	England	NX Newcastle	Adam Theo

List of 2026 concerts
Date (2026)	City	Country	Venue	Supporting acts
30 January	San Diego	United States	The Observatory North Park	Adam Theo
2 February	Los Angeles (Note: Billed as Hollywood in promotional material.)	United States	Hollywood Palladium	Adam Theo
3 February	San Francisco	United States	The Fillmore	Adam Theo
5 February	Portland	United States	Crystal Ballroom	Adam Theo
6 February	Seattle	United States	Paramount Theatre	Adam Theo
7 February	Vancouver	Canada	Vogue Theatre	Adam Theo
10 February	Denver	United States	Fillmore Auditorium	Adam Theo
12 February	Chicago	United States	House of Blues	Adam Theo
15 February	Silver Spring	United States	The Fillmore Silver Spring	Adam Theo
16 February	Philadelphia	United States	The Fillmore Philadelphia	Adam Theo
18 February	Boston	United States	House of Blues	Adam Theo
19 February	New York City (Note: Billed as Brooklyn in promotional material.)	United States	Brooklyn Paramount	Adam Theo
21 February	Montreal	Canada	M Telus	Adam Theo
23 February	Toronto	Canada	History	Adam Theo
3 March	Brussels	Belgium	La Madeleine	Adam Theo
4 March	Brussels	Belgium	La Madeleine	Adam Theo
7 March	Cologne	Germany	E-Werk	Adam Theo
8 March	Amsterdam	Netherlands	Paradiso	Adam Theo
9 March	Amsterdam	Netherlands	Paradiso	Adam Theo
11 March	Paris	France	Salle Pleyel	Adam Theo
12 March	Zurich	Switzerland	X-TRA	Adam Theo
14 March	Milan	Italy	Fabrique	Adam Theo
16 March	Berlin	Germany	Columbiahalle	Adam Theo
18 March	Hamburg	Germany	Große Freiheit 36	Adam Theo
