= Plastic Box (song) =

Single by Jade

from the album That's Showbiz Baby!
- Released: 20 June 2025
- Genre: Synth-pop
- Length: 3:21
- Label: RCA
- Songwriters: Daniel Traynor; Jade Thirlwall; Lauren Aquilina; Oscar Görres
- Producers: Grades; Oscar Görres

Jade singles chronology
"Hot" (English version remix) (2025)	"Plastic Box" (2025)	"Gossip" (2025)

Music video
- "Plastic Box" on YouTube

"Plastic Box" is a song by English singer Jade. It was released through RCA Records on 20 June 2025, as the fourth single from her debut studio album That's Showbiz Baby! (2025). The song peaked at number 44 on the UK Singles Chart, and became her sixth charting entry.

== Background and promotion ==
The song was performed during her set at BBC Radio 1's Big Weekend, and later at the 2025 edition of Mighty Hoopla, hinting an imminent release. Shortly after the show, she would announce the song's upcoming release on 20 June 2025. The song's release date and cover were unveiled on 11 June 2025, accompanied by an early preview of the track.

== Composition and lyrics ==
"Plastic Box" was written by Jade Thirlwall, along with Lauren Aquilina and Grades, who also took part in the song's production, along with Oscar Görres. The song is described as an electronic synth-pop song. Thirlwall referred to the song as a "happy-sad pop song" about the irrational insecurity over a partner's past relationships, calling it one of her favorite songs she has written. Several critics compared the song to the work of Swedish singer Robyn.

== Music video ==
The official music video of the song premiered on 20 June 2025. It was directed by India Harris, and contains references to Madonna's "Don't Tell Me" music video.

== Track listing ==
- Streaming/digital download
1. "Plastic Box" – 3:21
2. "Angel of My Dreams" – 3:17
3. "FUFN (Fuck You for Now)" – 3:33
4. "Fantasy" – 3:36
5. "Midnight Cowboy" – 3:31
- Streaming/digital download – vocoded
1. "Plastic Box" (vocoded) – 3:31

== Reception ==
The song received positive reviews from critics for its emotional lyrics, synth-pop production, and Thirlwall's vocal performance. Critics highlighted the song as a standout track from the album, noting its introspective themes and polished production.

Critics' year-end rankings
Publication	List	Rank	Ref.
NME	The 50 Best Songs of 2025	19	
Pitchfork	The 100 Best Songs of 2025	48	
The Guardian	The 20 Best Songs of 2025	6	
Paste	The 100 Best Songs of 2025	3	

== Charts ==
=== Weekly charts ===
Weekly chart performance for "Plastic Box"
Chart (2025)	Peak position
Estonia Airplay (TopHit)	54
Malta Airplay (Radiomonitor)	11
UK Singles (Official Charts)	44

=== Monthly charts ===
Monthly chart performance for "Plastic Box"
Chart (2025)	Peak position
Estonia Airplay (TopHit)	87

== Awards and nominations ==
"Plastic Box" received a nomination for the 2025 Popjustice £20 Music Prize, alongside four other songs by the singer: "Angel of My Dreams", "Fantasy", "It Girl", and "FUFN (Fuck You for Now)", among the full list of nominees. On 16 October 2025, "Plastic Box" was revealed as the winner of the prize.

Year	Award	Category	Result	Ref.
2025	Popjustice £20 Music Prize	Best British Pop Single	Won	
2025	CelebMix Awards	Song of the Year	Pending	

== Release history ==
"Plastic Box" release history
Region	Date	Version	Format	Label	Ref.
Various	20 June 2025	Original	Digital download; streaming	RCA	
Various	15 August 2025	Vocoded	Digital download; streaming	RCA	
