= Church (Jade Thirlwall song) =

- "M.A.S.S." version cover

Single by Jade

from the album That's Showbiz Baby! The Encore
- Released: 5 December 2025
- Studio: The Pool, Miloco, London; Salvation, Brighton
- Genre: Electropop
- Length: 3:40
- Label: RCA
- Songwriters: Pablo Bowman; Sarah Hudson; Mark Schick; Jade Thirlwall
- Producers: Jason Evigan; Mark Schick

Jade singles chronology
"Unconditional" (2025)	"Church" (2025)

Music video
- "Church" on YouTube

"Church" is a song by English singer Jade. It was released by RCA Records on 5 December 2025, as a single from the deluxe edition of her debut studio album, That's Showbiz Baby!, subtitled The Encore. She wrote the song with Sarah Hudson, Mark Schick, and Pablo Bowman, whom also worked with her on other singles from the album, including "Angel of My Dreams", "Fantasy", and "Unconditional". The track was produced by Schick and Jason Evigan.

== Background ==
Thirlwall announced her debut album, That's Showbiz Baby!, on 14 May 2025. The album was subsequently released on 12 September 2025. She teased the deluxe version of album on her TikTok and Instagram accounts, beginning on 30 November 2025 by posting a short clip with the caption "'I've been a busy gal! 💖 #jade #newmusic #church'" and subsequently revealing that the song would be released the following week on 5 December.

== Composition and lyrics ==
"Church" is an electropop song, with elements of dance-pop, and was written by Thirlwall, Sarah Hudson, Mark Schick, and Pablo Bowman. Thirlwall described the song as a "love letter" to her LGBTQIA+ fans, and felt it was "important" to collaborate with Hudson, who she described as "really intwined" with that community in Los Angeles.

It's no secret that I have a predominantly LGBTQIA+ fan base. "Church" is like "Angel [Of My Dreams]" – it's telling a story of my journey within that space. The verse starts with: "When I was a little girl, that's when I met the queen". That's literally a memory of my first introduction to drag culture: watching a Benidorm queen on stage, looking fabulous, and that moment sparking my love for drag culture as a child... and everything that came with it. As the song progresses, it becomes more about being an ally in my own way. For me it's the grand finale of the That's Showbiz Baby! era because it's super inclusive. It's a love letter to all the fans of the whole campaign and what we've done together; this idea of creating a lovely, safe space for me and the fans to share that love for each other."

— Jade, Gay Times

== Live performances ==
Thirlwall performed the song live for the first time on The Graham Norton Show on 12 December 2025. Among the guests on that episode was Edward Enninful, whom Jade name-checks on her promotional single "Midnight Cowboy".

== Music video ==
The official music video for the song was released on 5 December 2025. It was directed by Billy King, and features Thirlwall as a "cult leader" alongside prominent LGBTQ+ artists including radio presenter Harriet Rose, fashion designer Daniel Lismore, actress and internet personality Bel Priestly, singer Sekou, and drag queen Bolly Illusion.

== Credits and personnel ==
Credits adapted from Tidal

- Ramera Abraham - engineering
- Pablo Bowman - background vocals
- Dale Becker - mastering
- Adam Burt - engineering
- Jason Evigan - production, engineering, background vocals, bass, drums, electric guitar, keyboards, programming
- Lewis Foord - engineering
- Alex Ghenea - mixing
- Sarah Hudson - background vocals
- Nate Mingo - engineering
- Mark Schick - production, engineering, background vocals, bass, drums, electric guitar, keyboards, piano, programming
- Jade Thirlwall - vocals
- Claude Vause - engineering

== Charts ==
Weekly chart performance
Chart (2025)	Peak position
Estonia Airplay (TopHit)	78
New Zealand Hot Singles (RMNZ)	34
UK Downloads (OCC)	18

== Release history ==
Release dates and formats
Region	Date	Format	Version	Label	Ref.
Italy	19 December 2025	Radio airplay	Original	Sony	
Various	19 December 2025	Music download; streaming	"M.A.S.S. – Majestic. Angelic. Spiritual. Sacred."	RCA	
