= Unconditional (Jade Thirlwall song) =

Single by Jade

from the album That's Showbiz Baby!
- Released: 3 October 2025
- Recorded: 2024
- Studio: Studio 13, London; Miloco Studios, London
- Genre: Dance-pop; disco; synth-pop
- Length: 3:32
- Label: RCA
- Songwriters: Jade Thirlwall; Mike Sabath; Pablo Bowman
- Producer: Sabath

Jade singles chronology
"Gossip" (2025)	"Unconditional" (2025)	"Church" (2025)

Visualiser video
- "Unconditional" on YouTube

"Unconditional" is a song by English singer Jade. It was released by RCA Records on 3 October 2025, as the sixth single from her debut solo studio album That's Showbiz Baby! (2025). Jade worked with Mike Sabath and Pablo Bowman whom she had previously worked with on other singles including "Angel of My Dreams" and "Fantasy".

The song received positive reviews from music critics, who praised its '80s disco pop sound, and compared it to works by Depeche Mode, Pet Shop Boys and Donna Summer. The song peaked at number 51 on the UK Singles Chart and number 36 on the New Zealand Hot Singles Chart.

== Background and release ==
On 10 September 2025, Jade announced the release of "Unconditional" on her social media, shortly before the release of That's Showbiz Baby, describing it as "portraying the turmoil and pain when someone you love is suffering". In the same post, she also revealed that the track would be accompanied by a visualiser directed by Fa & Fon, which she described as depicting times she has been "given terrible news and just had to get on with the show, or sacrificed valuable time with family for [the music] industry".

== Composition and lyrics ==
"Unconditional" is a dance-pop song, with elements of disco and synth-pop, and was written by Thirlwall, Mike Sabath and Pablo Bowman. In an interview with Capital UK, Thirlwall described the lyrical content of the track as being "a love letter to [her] mum", who has lupus, which she wrote while "[her] mum was in hospital", and that the song is "obviously sad but it's still got a disco element to it". In the same interview, she further described the song as being about "wishing I could just fix her with my unconditional love", and that during the writing process of the song she was "literally in and out of the room on the phone to [her] brother in the hospital". Thirlwall confirmed in an interview on NME and a post on her Instagram page that the song was the final track to be written and recorded for That's Showbiz Baby.

== Music video ==
The music video for "Unconditional" was released on 10 September 2025, two days before the release of the album. It was directed by Fa & Fon, who previously worked with Jade on the visualisers for "Midnight Cowboy" and "It Girl", and is composed entirely of behind-the-scenes footage of the video shoots for the album tracks "Self Saboteur", "Lip Service", "Headache", "Glitch", and "Silent Disco", which were also directed by Fa & Fon and would later be released alongside the album on 12 September 2025. During the footage, Jade appears distressed and takes phone calls from unseen family members between takes whilst dealing with media attention. Eventually, at the end of the video, a grief-stricken Jade flees the video shoots upon getting some bad news from her family. Jade confirmed in an Instagram post that the video for the song was meant to "break the fourth wall" of the other video shoots and reflect her real-life struggles with balancing work and family commitments.

== Live performances ==
Jade performed the song for the first time on her That's Showbiz Baby: the Tour, as the fourth song on the set list, starting with the tour's first stop in Dublin, Ireland, on 7 October 2025. During the tour, on 22 October 2025, Jade performed the song as part of a live-streamed concert at the Roundhouse in London, in partnership with YouTube Music.

== Charts ==
Weekly chart performance
Chart (2025)	Peak position
New Zealand Hot Singles (RMNZ)	36
UK Singles (Official Charts)	51

== Release history ==
Release dates and formats
Region	Date	Format	Label	Ref.
Various	10 September 2025	Digital download; streaming	RCA	
Italy	3 October 2025	Radio airplay	Sony	
