= That's Showbiz Baby! =

2025 studio album by Jade

- Standard cover

Studio album by Jade
- Released: 12 September 2025
- Genre: Pop
- Length: 46:19
- Label: RCA
- Producers: Jonah Christian; Cirkut; Goldfingers; Grades; Oscar Görres; Dave Hamelin; Inverness; Lostboy; Stephen Mykal; Mike Sabath; Johan Salomonsson; Starsmith; TimFromTheHouse

Singles from That's Showbiz Baby!
- 1. "Angel of My Dreams" Released: 19 July 2024; 2. "Fantasy" Released: 18 October 2024; 3. "FUFN (Fuck You for Now)" Released: 14 March 2025; 4. "Plastic Box" Released: 20 June 2025; 5. "Unconditional" Released: 3 October 2025

Singles from That's Showbiz Baby! The Encore
- 1. "Church" Released: 5 December 2025

That's Showbiz Baby! is the first solo studio album by the English singer Jade, released on 12 September 2025 by RCA Records. The album is primarily a pop record with elements of disco, electroclash, and synth-pop. For the album, Jade collaborated with several producers, including Cirkut, Lostboy, MNEK, Raye, and Mike Sabath, among others.

The album was supported by the release of five singles, including the top ten Platinum-certified "Angel of My Dreams", "Fantasy", "FUFN (Fuck You for Now)", "Plastic Box", and "Unconditional". That's Showbiz Baby! was met with widespread acclaim upon its release from critics, who highlighted Jade's musical journey from Little Mix to solo stardom, praising both its themes and overall production. She commenced on a concert tour in October 2025 to promote the album; it concluded in March 2026. A deluxe edition, subtitled The Encore, was released on 5 December 2025.

Commercially, That's Showbiz Baby! reached number three in the UK, where it earned the highest first-week sales for a debut album in 2025. Additionally, it charted within the top ten in Belgium (Flanders), Ireland, and Scotland, and the top twenty in Australia, Austria, Belgium (Wallonia), Poland, and the Netherlands. In February 2026, the album was certified silver by the British Phonographic Industry (BPI), denoting equivalent sales of 60,000 copies in the country.

== Background ==
In 2008 and 2010, Jade auditioned for the fifth and seventh series of The X Factor. During the eighth series in 2011, she auditioned again; during the Bootcamp stage, Jade—who had been performing with a group named Orion—was placed into Little Mix (Note: Little Mix were initially formed under the name Rhythmix; however, the name was changed due to a trademark dispute with the charity of the same name, Rhythmix.) which was formed by the judges. The group continued to progress through the competition and was named as winners during the finale on 11 December 2011. During their time as a group, they sold over 75 million records worldwide, earned six UK platinum-certified albums, and had five UK number one singles. In December 2021, the group announced that following the completion of the Confetti Tour in 2022, they would take a hiatus to pursue solo endeavours. In 2025, she revealed how she was the least enthused about the band's hiatus. "I did anything to avoid sitting with my thoughts. I was so in love with what we stood for and knew there'd be a gap when we left," she told The Fader. Speaking to Rolling Stone UK, Jade later expressed her doubts about being put in a girl group, telling the magazine that she did not see herself as the "conventional girl's girl. I was nerdy and quiet."

In March 2022, Sony Music UK announced Jade had signed with RCA Records for her solo career; she also signed with management company Full Stop for representation. Born Jade Thirlwall, she dropped Thirlwall in her pursuit of a solo career, revealing "[i]t was intentional. I was so used to saying, 'Hi, I'm Jade from Little Mix,' for so long that removing that off the end felt really important for me." She further cited the continued misspelling of her surname as another reason to go by a mononym.

== Development and recording ==
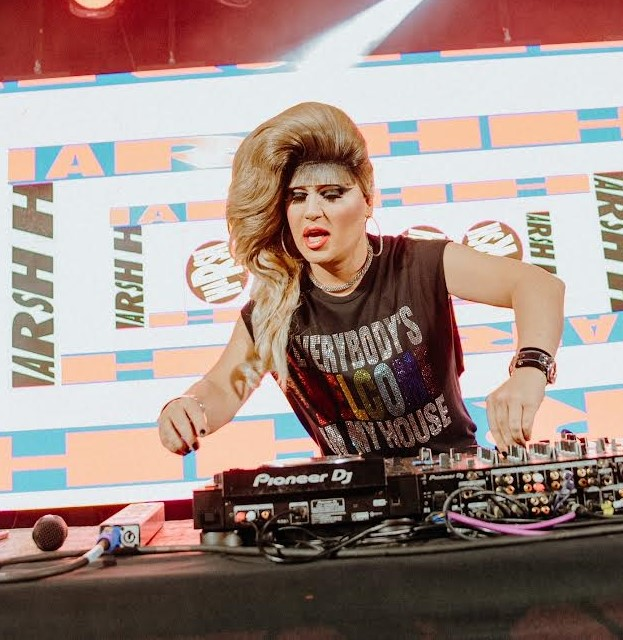
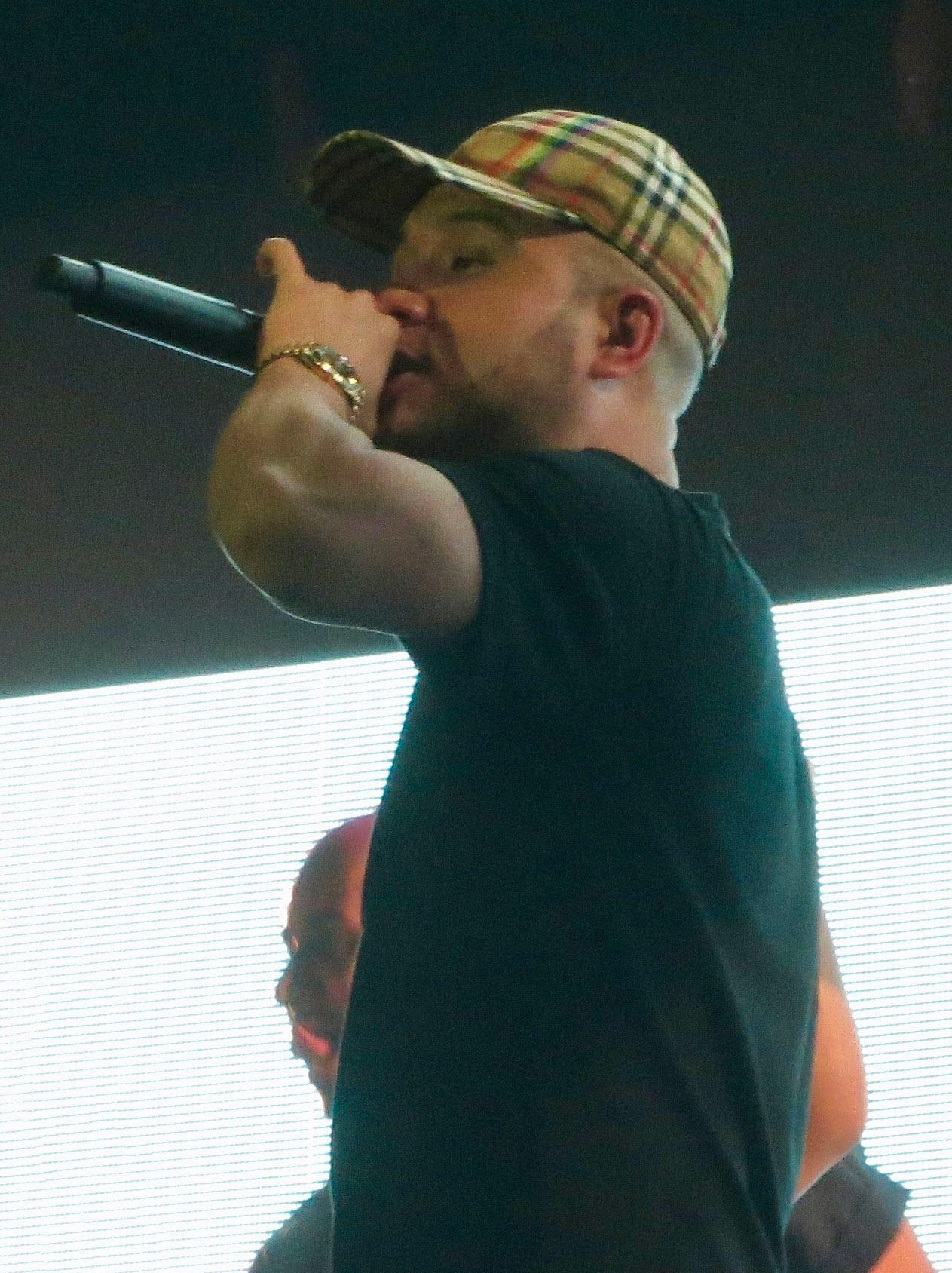
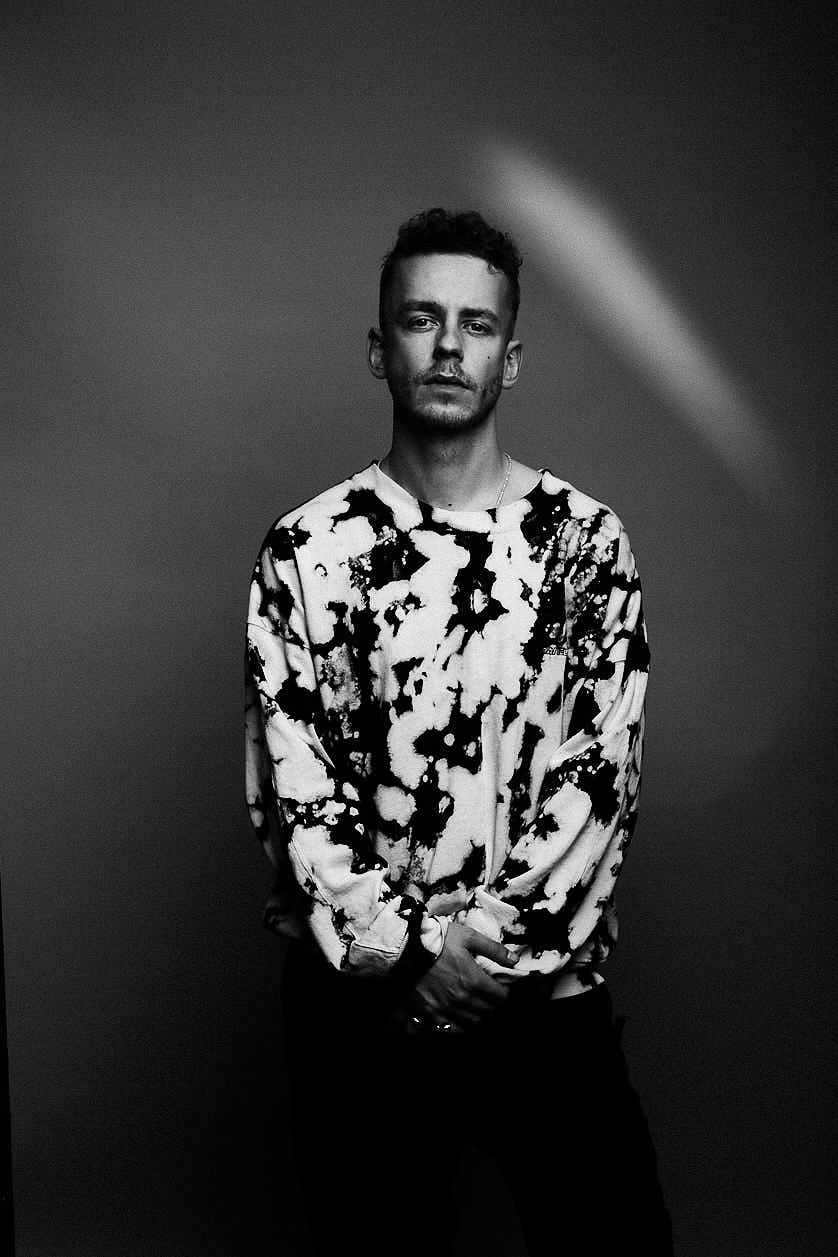
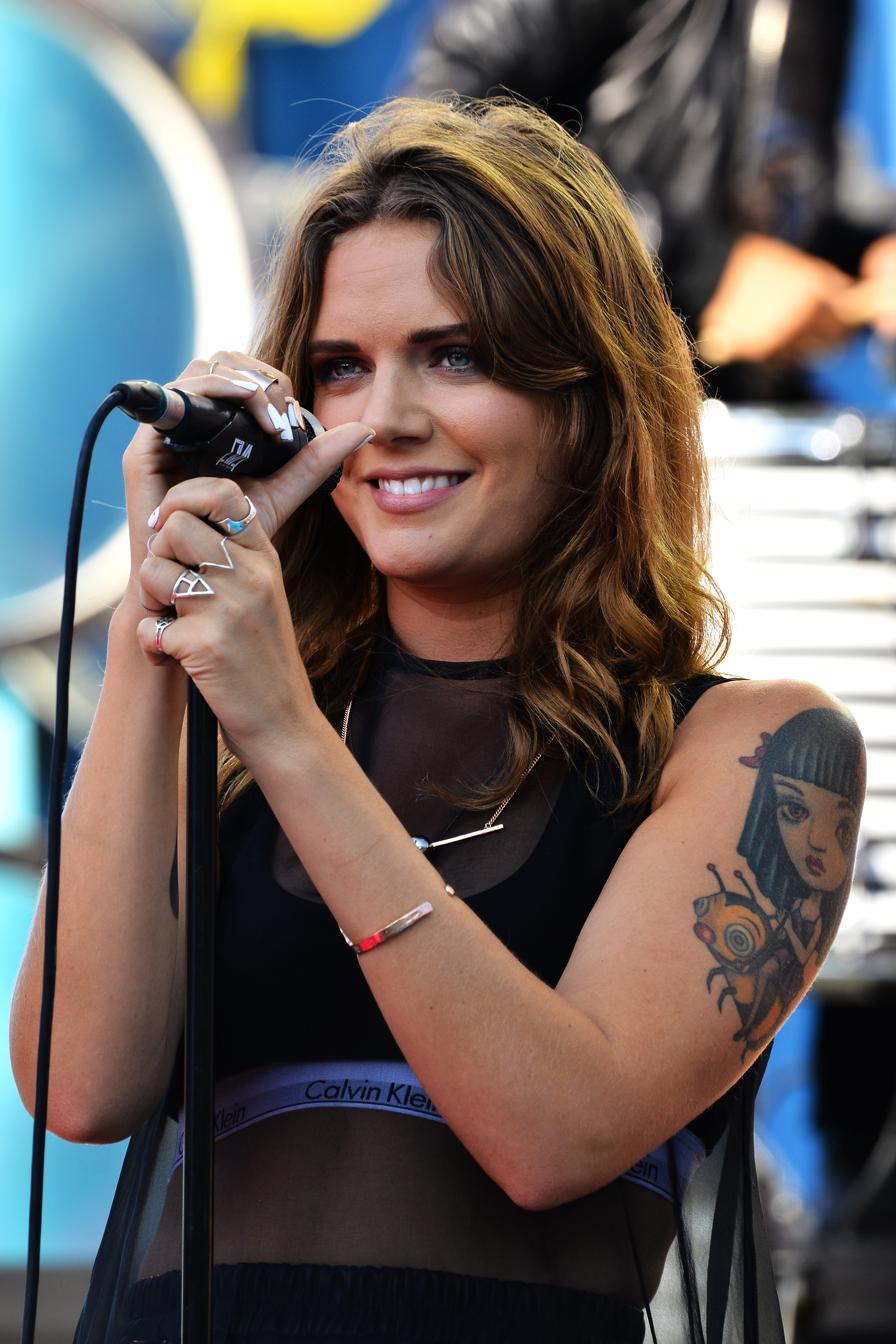
Clockwise: Jodie Harsh and Jax Jones were first linked to the project in 2022; by 2023, Tove Lo and Lostboy were reported to have been involved.

London-based DJ Jodie Harsh revealed she was in the studio with Jade in July 2022, but was unsure if the material—described at the time as "kind of half-finished stuff"—would appear on the singer's solo album. The following month, Jax Jones revealed he had collaborated with Jade, stating, "We finished off the thing that we worked on. I think, for her, it's all about timing. When she's ready she's going to unleash." Sessions with Jones were first reported in December 2021, when it was believed their collaboration would launch Jade's solo career.

By 2023, Jade was reported to have been seen working with Lostboy and Tove Lo. Other contributors included Raye and Jade's long-term boyfriend, Jordan Stephens, the latter of whom she co-wrote a song with after she had a dream about him cheating. Speaking to Harper's Bazaar Australia, Jade revealed she had written "hundreds of songs" for the album. She further expressed to Rolling Stone UK that she had little pressure from her record label to release solo music, revealing that had she felt such pressures she "would've been anxious and have put so much pressure on myself to be as big as [Little Mix] was".

Discussing the album with Vogue, Jade remarked that it feels "a bit like a rebirth, which sounds quite cheesy. But I have found out so many things about myself in this process." She further detailed that she used the three-year process of creating the album as a way of breaking the habit of releasing an album yearly and then going on tour, as done with Little Mix, revealing her belief that it was programming to "crave relevancy". In the article, Jade also hinted at the release of a deluxe edition for the album. Self-identified as a student of pop music, she told Paste that she will "know if an audience just wants the normal [versional, sic] of a song. But in a space like Live Lounge, that's my opportunity to totally rework something and show people my artistry—show people that I'm not just going to do a standard cover or singalong. That's not what I do."

She described the process of creating That's Showbiz Baby! as speed dating, revealing, "I think because it was the first record, I was doing a lot of speed dating with producers and writers, finding my people." She further addressed this with RTÉ, stating, "In my head, I was like, 'I've got to release something straight away, everyone's going to forget about me. I've got to ride the wave of Little Mix' – all that stuff that I've been programmed to think as a pop artist."

On 27 November 2025, Jade announced a deluxe edition, subtitled The Encore. It was released digitally on 5 December 2025. Physical editions followed on differing dates.

== Composition ==
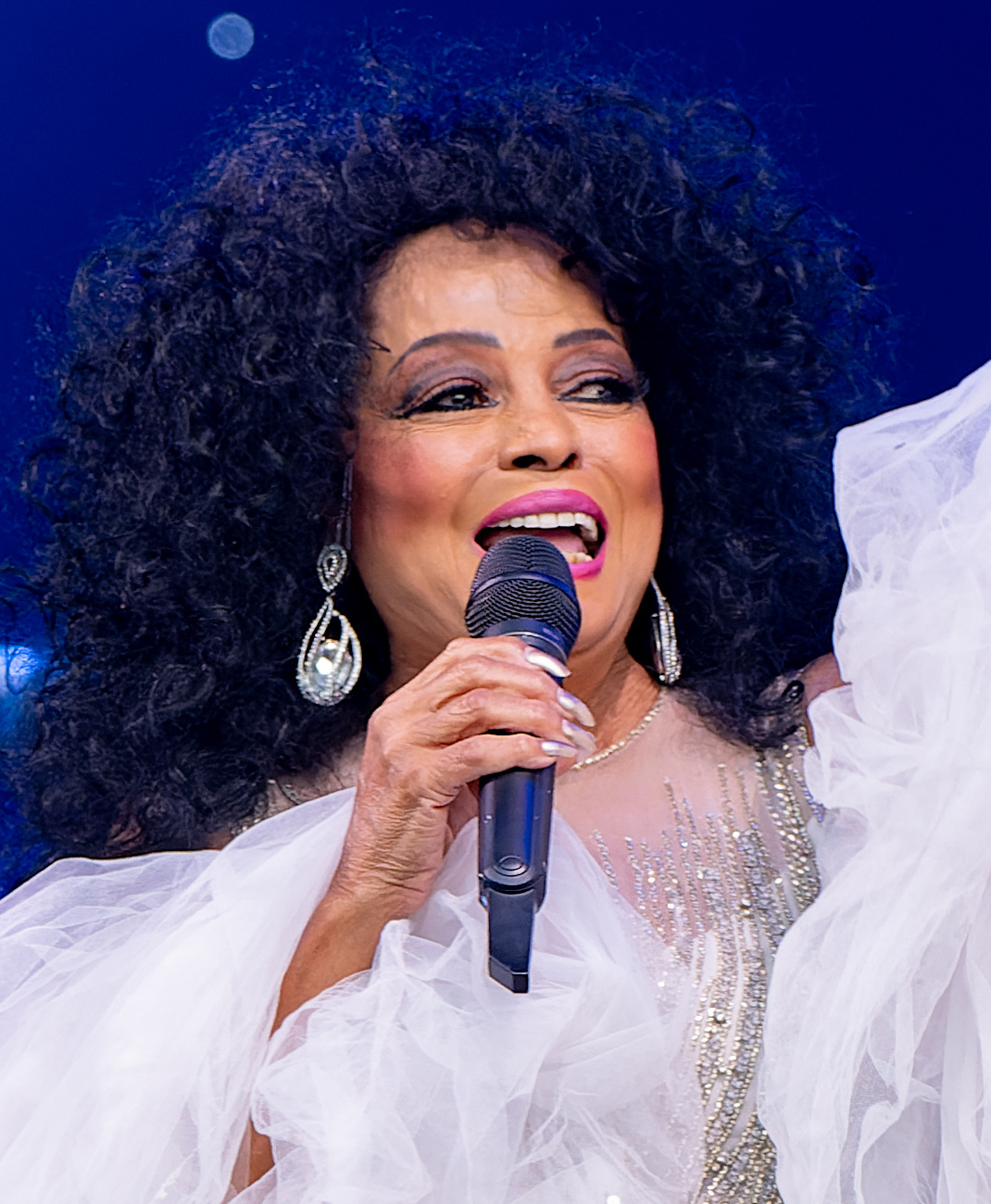
Jade cited Diana Ross (pictured) as an influence for the album and its sound; critics further noted this upon review of the album.

That's Showbiz Baby! is described as a pop music record, while several reviewers noted the influence of electroclash and synth-pop as well. Musically, the album is inspired by the sounds from Jade's childhood, with artists and bands including Cascada, Madonna, Diana Ross, Scooter, and the Spice Girls. "Angel of My Dreams" deals with the "double-edged sword" that is fame. It interpolates Sandie Shaw's "Puppet on a String"; the lyrics serve as a double entendre, referencing Simon Cowell and his companies Syco Music/Syco Entertainment. ("Selling my soul to a psycho"). Second track "It Girl" is an "anthem that similarly opens with an operatic lament" in a techno-inspired sound; like the predecessor, it features another reference to Cowell ("It's a no from me"), as well as contractual clauses within the music industry ("Clause in the contract, contract gone"). Musically, the song incorporates elements of pop, in addition to electronica, electroclash, and dance-pop. The next song is "FUFN (Fuck You for Now)", which details the messy results of a drunken fight, as well as the burnout of working hard in the entertainment industry.

Fourth track, "Plastic Box", was written about Stephens and what she described as her own "toxic energy" towards him in the beginning of their relationship; with its synth-pop production, the song echoes the "electropop solitude" recognised with the artist Robyn. With "Midnight Cowboy", it is an experimental pop and electronica production, featuring club influence, in which Jade references former British Vogue editor Edward Enninful, owning one's on sexuality, and the non-binary community. The song also incorporates a spoken-word introduction by Rwandan-Scottish actor Ncuti Gatwa. Conceptually, "Fantasy" showcases Jade's love of disco music, while exploring funk, and drawing inspiration from Studio 54. Lyrically, the song speaks of exploring your own sexual desires alongside a partner one feels safe exploring them with, as well as other subjects, such as femininity and being sex-positive. Jade cited Donna Summer as vocal inspiration for the song. Official Charts' George Griffiths compared the song to that of Mariah Carey, Chic, Raye, and Nile Rogers, with its 70s funk and 80s post-disco sound. In a review for Dork, Abigail Firth noted resemblance to Dua Lipa's Future Nostalgia (2020) and Jessie Ware's What's Your Pleasure? (2020), as well as the influence of SG Lewis, Lo, Kylie Minogue, Rogers, and Ross.

"Unconditional" explores the ambitions of the album itself, as well as her mother's battle with various illnesses, including lupus, with a "disco driven" sound, that is reminiscent of Depeche Mode and Pet Shop Boys, and Giorgio Moroder. "Self Saboteur", the eighth track and one of the first songs written for the album, was written around the concept of running away when love begins to feel scary in a new relationship. On "Lip Service", the contemporary R&B and tropical house-influenced song has Jade singing about oral sex; the song was written after label executives felt another song about anal sex was cut due to it being found "too much, too far". Both of the latter songs are described as "shimmering synth-led cuts" by DIY.

The album's tenth track, "Headache", deals with Jade's self-confessed behaviour when she is premenstrual. "Natural at Disaster" is a Chappell Roan-inspired pop ballad, which features "contemplative percussion and vocal yearning". Paste suggested the lyrical content could be about her former Little Mix groupmate Jesy Nelson. "Glitch" sees Jade experimenting with "futuristic R&B" and hyperpop, while the lyrics explore her insecurities about anxiety-induced eye twitches. Vocally, she users her upper register. The thirteenth track, "Before You Break My Heart", interpolates the Supremes' "Stop! In the Name of Love". Its production is described as "chunky disco", and examples the heritage of girl groups. The song also features a sample recording of Jade's younger self singing the chorus. The slower-paced "Silent Disco" closes the album, dealing with the subject of inner peace and navigating the accomplishment of release with a bruised and delicate strength that isolates; it also features "lyrical intimacy amid gauzy synths".

== Artwork and title ==
That's Showbiz Baby! takes its title from the lyrics of "It Girl" after fans commented on how much it sounded like an album title. "The album wasn't originally called that, it was called something else, which I don't wanna say in case I use it again. The fans steered me in the that's showbiz baby direction," Jade told Ladygunn. She further made an example of the album's cover to a scene in Willy Wonka and the Chocolate Factory (1971), explaining that she wanted to "show this idea that there are multiple versions of myself, and then there's the bigger Jade who's the one in control." Several artwork variants were made available on Jade's official store in various different formats. Text on That's Showbiz Baby! is displayed in blue, while text on The Encore is displayed in red. The deluxe edition The Encore was described as the "grand finale" for the album.

== Promotion and release ==
=== Live performance and tour ===
In connection to the album's announcement on 14 May 2025, Jade revealed a concert tour, with dates in the United Kingdom and Ireland, commencing on 8 October 2025. Concerts in North America and Europe were announced on 23 September 2025. She performed at BBC Radio 1's Big Weekend on 25 May 2025, where she debuted "Plastic Box". One week later, Jade performed at the 2025 edition of Mighty Hoopla. She opened Capital's Summertime Ball on 15 June 2025.

On 28 June, Jade performed at Glastonbury Festival 2025, where she debuted "Gossip" and performed it with Australian band Confidence Man. LADbible Group noted outrage for her use of the word "cunt" in the song, despite BBC issuing a warning ahead of the set. Additionally, during her performance of "FUFN (Fuck You for Now)", the Scottish media outlet The National noted Jade's callout of social issues, such as the justification of genocide, the right-wing populist political party Reform UK, and transphobia. On 22 September 2025, she appeared on Late Night with Seth Meyers. The following day, she appeared on The Today Show, where she performed "Angel of My Dreams".

In May 2026, Jade made her Tiny Desk Concerts debut, performing stripped-down arrangements of five tracks from the album: "Midnight Cowboy", "Fantasy", "Silent Disco", "Plastic Box", and "Angel of My Dreams". The performance was met with positive reception, with reviewers praising her live vocals, stage presence, and the organic reinvention of her theatrical pop productions into a smaller setting.

=== Singles and promotional singles ===
The lead single, "Angel of My Dreams", was released on 19 July 2024. Commercially, the song debuted at number seven on the UK Singles Chart, and achieved platinum certification by the British Phonographic Industry. "Midnight Cowboy" was released as a promotional single in September 2024, followed by the second single, "Fantasy" the following month. A second promotional single, "It Girl", was released in January 2025, with the album's third single, "FUFN (Fuck You for Now)", following two months later. "Plastic Box" was released as the album's fourth single on 20 June 2025.

"Unconditional" was released as the third promotional single two days prior to the album's release, accompanied by a visualiser video. It was released to Italian radio by Sony Music Italy on 3 October 2025, as the album's fifth single. "Church" was released on 5 December 2025 as the first single from The Encore.

=== Videos and visual album ===
The music video for "Angel of My Dreams", directed by Aube Perrie and filmed in London in 2024, was inspired by the films Showgirls (1995), The Fifth Element (1997), and Black Swan (2010). The video features both childhood clips, in addition to both of Jade's auditions for The X Factor. Conceptually, it follows a rags to riches story, as Jade shows her own journey to stardom. The video features eleven different styled looks. She described it as "very clinical", while also comparing it to Lady Gaga's music video for "Bad Romance" (2009). With "Fantasy", the David LaChapelle directed video pays homage to the 1976 film Carrie, based on the 1974 novel of the same name by Stephen King. "FUFN (Fuck You for Now)" features Nick Grimshaw and shows Jade navigating through fame alongside her partner.

In addition to music videos, visualisers were also released for the songs "Midnight Cowboy" and "It Girl". The former showcases paparazzi photographing Jade as she dances through water foundations, while the latter continues as a tease from the "Angel of My Dreams" music video. Both were directed by Fa & Fon, and produced by Riff Raff Films. On the day of the album's release, Jade premiered the visualiser for every song on the track listing.

A music video for "Church" premiered on 5 December 2025. Directed by Billy King, with creative direction by Maximilian Raynor, the video takes inspiration from The Handmaid's Tale. DIY described the video as "ominous" and a "deliciously dark watch".

== Critical reception ==
Professional ratings
Aggregate scores
Source	Rating
AnyDecentMusic?	7.9/10
Metacritic	85/100
Review scores
Source	Rating
DIY	5/5 stars
The Guardian	4/5 stars
The i Paper	4/5 stars
The Independent	4/5 stars
The Line of Best Fit	8/10
MusicOMH	4/5 stars
NME	4/5 stars
Paste	8/10
Pitchfork	7.5/10
Rolling Stone	4/5 stars

That's Showbiz Baby! received critical acclaim from music critics. According to the review aggregator Metacritic, That's Showbiz Baby received "universal acclaim" based on a weighted average score of 85 out of 100 from twelve critic scores. AnyDecentMusic? gave the album a score of 7.9 out of 10 based on fifteen reviews.

Sophie Williams of Billboard described the album as "precise and introspective", while also noting her ability to create a "distinct, dazzlingly ornate record while honoring those who informed her musical education." DIY's Daisy Carter gave the album a perfect score and wrote that after a "career's worth of constricting, prescriptive pop formula, [Jade's] now finally concocted a recipe for success on her own terms — and it's anything but vanilla." Nmesoma Okechukwu of Euphoria praised Jade's turn from girl group to soloist, noting her as someone who "breathes and bleeds creativity and artistic experience". In their track-by-track breakdown, Fault described the album as "bold, theatrical, and unapologetically [Jade] as fans hoped it would be." In a review for The Guardian, Laura Snapes wrote that while Jade thrived through chaos amid the themes of madness and freedom, she could not maintain it throughout the entirety of the album. Snapes further noted comparisons to artists, such as Beyoncé, Geri Halliwell, Robyn, and Taylor Swift.

The i Paper complimented Jade's vocals within the soprano range while also believing her to have made a name for herself in her own right in comparison to her Little Mix groupmates. MusicOMH praised the album for its melodies and vocal hooks, as well as its varied musical genres. NME described the album as "chaotic, intense, with a bit of everything thrown in", while believing Jade had transitioned from a girl group starlet to a solo pop superstar. Paste's Grace Robins-Somerville felt that with the album, Jade had "proven herself more than ready to be a leading lady". Rolling Stone declared she has made a statement with the album, reviewing that it was a "fun, frothy pop album where the onetime Simon Cowell mentee thrills in the dancefloor's unpredictable abandon and her own power." The publication further compared Jade's solo material to that of Little Mix, stating that while the latter "shattered and reassembled" within the pop music genre, the former embraced the chaos. Pitchfork included the album on their list of albums out on 12 September to listen to. In their review, the magazine rated the album 7.5 out of 10. They described the album as a "romp of a record", however, noted the album's back-half was "slightly overshadowed" by the singles that preceded its release.

The Independent featured editor Adam White felt the album excelled with tracks in the vein of the first single "Angel of My Dreams", but expressed disappointment in what he described as tracks that held "more conventional, chart-friendly sounds". In their review, The Line of Best Fit referred to the album as the "blueprint for new artists breaking through", but, felt the back half of the album lacked some of the energy found in the earlier tracks.

=== Year-end lists ===
That's Showbiz Baby! appeared in the year-end rankings of several publications for 2025, featuring in the top ten of The Forty-Five (3), The Fader (8), and Business Insider (9). The album was also featured in the top twenty rankings of several publications, including The Guardian (11), Dork (14), The Independent (17), NME (17), and Time Out (17). That's Showbiz Baby was also ranked within the top fifty by Stereogum (21), Rolling Stone (22), The Times (24), Yardbarker (25), Slant Magazine (41), PopMatters (46), and Metacritic (49). Additionally, Clash and The Quietus included the album at numbers 59 and 88, respectively.

On individual critics' lists, the album was ranked second by Mark J. Marraccini of Albumism, eighth by Lindsay Zoladz of The New York Times, and nineteenth by Rob Sheffield of Rolling Stone. Meanwhile, Paste described That's Showbiz Baby as the fifth-best album of the year by a debut act, while Pitchfork ranked it at number 27 among the year's most notable pop releases. Publications that included the record in unranked compilations are Cosmopolitan, Elle, The Hollywood Reporter, HuffPost, HMV, Rolling Stone UK, and Us Weekly.

Listicles
Publication	List	Rank	Ref.
Business Insider	The Best Albums of 2025	9	
Dork	Albums of the Year 2025	14	
The Fader	The 50 Best Albums of 2025	8	
The Guardian	The 50 Best Albums of 2025	11	
The Independent	The 20 Best Albums of 2025	17	
Lindsay Zoladz (The New York Times)	Best Albums of 2025	8	
NME	The 50 Best Albums of 2025	17	
Paste	The 27 Best Debut Albums of 2025	5	
Rob Sheffield (Rolling Stone)	Top 20 Albums of 2025	19	
Time Out	The 25 Best Albums of 2025	17	

== Accolades ==
Accolades
Year	Organization	Category	Result	Ref.
2026	iHeartRadio Music Awards	Favorite Debut Album	Nominated	
2026	Mercury Prize	Album of the Year	Nominated	

== Commercial performance ==
That's Showbiz Baby! debuted at number three on the UK Albums Chart, with 23,262 album-equivalent units, securing the biggest opening week for a debut album in 2025. In its second week on the chart, the album placed at number 30, selling an additional 4,156 copies. The album remained in the top 100 of the UK Albums Chart for a total of nine weeks, and was certified silver by the British Phonographic Industry (BPI) in February 2026. Elsewhere, the album entered at number two on the Scottish Albums Chart, and number nine on the Irish Albums Chart. In Australia, it opened at number 11 on the ARIA Top 50 Albums Chart.

In Europe, That's Showbiz Baby! debuted at number 54 on the French Albums chart, while reaching numbers 28 and 22 on the German Albums and Spanish Albums charts, respectively. It reached the top twenty in Austria, Belgium, Poland, and the Netherlands. In the US, the album reached number 24 on the Billboard Top Album Sales chart, and charted at number six on the Billboard Top Dance Albums chart.

== Track listing ==
That's Showbiz Baby! track listing
No.	Title	Writer(s)	Producer(s)	Length
1.	"Angel of My Dreams"	Jade Thirlwall; Mike Sabath; Pablo Bowman; Steph Jones; Bill Martin; Phil Coulter	Sabath	3:17
2.	"It Girl"	Thirlwall; Henry Russell Walter; Peter Rycroft; Lauren Aquilina; James Abrahart	Lostboy; Cirkut	2:33
3.	"FUFN (Fuck You for Now)"	Thirlwall; Rachel Keen; Dave Hamelin; David Mickey Karbal	Lostboy; Hamelin	3:35
4.	"Plastic Box"	Thirlwall; Daniel Traynor; Aquilina; Oscar Görres	Grades; Görres	3:21
5.	"Midnight Cowboy"	Thirlwall; Jonah Christian; Keen; Stephen Mykal	Christian; Mykal	3:31
6.	"Fantasy"	Thirlwall; Sabath; Bowman	Sabath	3:36
7.	"Unconditional"	Thirlwall; Sabath; Bowman	Sabath	3:32
8.	"Self Saboteur"	Thirlwall; Frank Nobel; Eyelar Mirzazadeh; Linus Nordström	Starsmith; Goldfingers	4:26
9.	"Lip Service"	Thirlwall; Timothy Nelson; Johan Salomonsson; Tove Lo; Uzoechi Emenike	Salomonsson; TimFromTheHouse	2:27
10.	"Headache"	Thirlwall; Sabath; Bowman	Sabath	2:44
11.	"Natural at Disaster"	Thirlwall; Rycroft; Aquilina	Lostboy	3:18
12.	"Glitch"	Thirlwall; Walter; Charles Roberts Nelson; Aquilina	Lostboy; Inverness	3:16
13.	"Before You Break My Heart"	Thirlwall; Sabath; Bowman; Brian Holland; Eddie Holland; Lamont Dozier	Sabath	3:16
14.	"Silent Disco"	Thirlwall; Keen; Christian	Christian	3:27
Total length:				46:19

That's Showbiz Baby! The Encore track listing
No.	Title	Writer(s)	Producer(s)	Length
15.	"Church"	Thirlwall; Sarah Hudson; Bowman; Mark Schick	Jason Evigan; Schick	3:40
16.	"This Is What We Dance For"	Thirlwall; Julia Michaels; Rycroft	Lostboy	3:04
17.	"Dreamcheater"	Thirlwall; Hamelin; Bowman; Benjamin Rose; Tobias Wincorn; Stephens	Hamelin; Sabath	2:39
18.	"Best You Could"	Thirlwall; George Tizzard; Rick Parkhouse	Red Triangle; Ramera Abraham	3:28
19.	"Use Me"	Thirlwall; Maegan Cottone; Tom Barnes; Peter Kelleher; Benjamin Kohn	TMS	3:18
20.	"Frozen"	Madonna; Patrick Leonard	Starsmith	3:21
21.	"If My Heart was a House"	Thirlwall; Bowman; Caroline Pennell; Danny Casio	Danny Casio	2:55
22.	"Tar"	Thirlwall; Hamelin; Johan Lenox; Skyler Stonestreet; Stephens	Hamelin; Lenox	3:35
Total length:				1:12:19

=== Notes ===
- "Angel of My Dreams" contains an interpolation of "Puppet on a String" (1967), written by Bill Martin and Phil Coulter, and performed by Sandie Shaw.
- "Before You Break My Heart" contains an interpolation of "Stop! In the Name of Love" (1965), written by Holland–Dozier–Holland, and performed by the Supremes.
- On music download and music streaming services, The Encore is listed as "disc two", with tracks listed 1–8.
- An orchestral version of "Natural at Disaster" appears as a bonus track on the Amazon Music edition of That's Showbiz Baby! The Encore.

== Personnel ==
Adapted via Tidal

=== Musicians ===
- Jade Thirlwall – vocals
- Michael Sabath – bass, drums, synthesizer (tracks 1, 6, 7, 10, 13, 14); guitar (1, 6, 13, 14), background vocals (1), programming (14)
- Nick Bral – background vocals (1)
- Steph Jones – background vocals (1)
- Lostboy – synthesizer (2); bass, keyboards, programming (3, 11); synthesizer (3)
- Cirkut – programming, synthesizer (2, 12)
- Dave Hamelin – percussion, programming, synthesizer (3)
- Arjay – synthesizer (3)
- Grades – keyboards, programming, synthesizer (4)
- Oscar Görres – guitar, keyboards, programming (4)
- Jonah Christian – bass, programming (5, 14); synthesizer (5); drums, guitar, keyboards (14)
- Stephen Mykal – bass, programming, synthesizer (5)
- Rachel Keen – synthesizer (5)
- Pablo Bowman – vocoder (6)
- Starsmith – keyboards, programming, synthesizer (8, 14); electric guitar (14)
- Eyelar Mirzazadeh – background vocals (8)
- Frank Nobel – programming (8)
- Linus Nordström – programming (8)
- TimFromTheHouse – instrumentation, drums, synthesizer (9)
- Johan Salmonsson – instrumentation (9)
- Inverness – programming, synthesizer (12)
- JHart – background vocals (12)

=== Technical ===
- Serban Ghenea – mixing (1, 2, 6, 12)
- Alex Ghenea – mixing (3–5, 8–11, 13, 14)
- Mike Crossey – mixing (7)
- Dale Becker – mastering
- Michael Sabath – engineering (1, 6, 10, 13)
- Ashley Jacobson – engineering (1, 6, 10)
- Cirkut – engineering (2, 12)
- Dave Hamelin – engineering (3)
- Jenna Feisenthal – engineering (3)
- Lostboy – engineering (3, 11)
- Ramera Abraham – engineering (3), vocal engineering (4–8, 10, 12–14)
- Grades – engineering (4)
- Oscar Görres – engineering (4)
- Jonah Christian – engineering (5, 14)
- Ricky Damian – engineering (7)
- Starsmith – engineering (8, 14)
- TimFromTheHouse – engineering (9)
- Josh Alamu – vocal engineering (5, 6, 10, 14)
- Frank Nobel – vocal engineering (8)
- MNEK – vocal engineering (8)
- Adam Burt – engineering assistance (2, 3, 5), mastering assistance (4, 7–11, 13, 14)
- Bryce Bordone – engineering assistance (2, 3, 6)
- Katie Harvey – engineering assistance (2, 3), mastering assistance (12)
- Noah McCorkle – engineering assistance (2, 3), mastering assistance (12)
- Nate Mingo – engineering assistance (5), mastering assistance (4, 7–11, 13, 14)
- Claude Vause – engineering assistance (6, 12)
- Sarah Dorgan – engineering assistance (6, 13)
- Evie Clark-Yospa – engineering assistance (13)

== Charts ==
Chart performance
Chart (2025)	Peak position
Australian Albums (ARIA)	11
Austrian Albums (Ö3 Austria)	18
Belgian Albums (Ultratop Flanders)	7
Belgian Albums (Ultratop Wallonia)	14
Dutch Albums (Album Top 100)	14
French Albums (SNEP)	54
German Albums (Offizielle Top 100)	28
German Pop Albums (Offizielle Top 100)	9
Irish Albums (Official Charts)	9
Polish Albums (ZPAV)	12
Portuguese Albums (AFP)	36
Scottish Albums (Official Charts)	2
Spanish Albums (PROMUSICAE)	22
Swedish Physical Albums (Sverigetopplistan)	10
UK Albums (Official Charts)	3
US Top Album Sales (Billboard)	24
US Top Dance Albums (Billboard)	6

== Certifications ==
Certifications
Region	Certification	Certified units/sales
United Kingdom (BPI)	Silver	60,000^{‡}
^{‡} Sales+streaming figures based on certification alone.

== Release history ==
Release history
Region	Initial release date	Edition	Formats	Label	Ref.
Various	12 September 2025	Standard	Cassette; CD; LP; music download; picture disc; streaming	RCA	
Various	5 December 2025	The Encore	Music download; streaming	RCA	
United Kingdom	19 December 2025	The Encore	CD	RCA	
United Kingdom	27 February 2026	The Encore	LP	RCA	
United States	3 April 2026	The Encore	LP	RCA	
