= Wasabi (Little Mix song) =

2018 song by Little Mix

Song by Little Mix

from the album LM5
- Released: 16 November 2018
- Genre: Dance-pop
- Length: 2:34
- Label: Syco
- Songwriters: Jade Thirlwall; MNEK; Mike Sabath; Alexandra Shungudzo Govere
- Producers: Mike Sabath; John Hill; Joe Kearns

Music video
- "Wasabi" on YouTube

"Wasabi" is a song recorded by British girl group Little Mix. It was released from their fifth studio album LM5 (2018), on 16 November 2018 by Syco, and appears as the tenth album track. It was co written by group member Jade Thirlwall, with MNEK, Mike Sabath, and Shungudzo, with production handled by Sabath, John Hill, and Joe Kearns.

"Wasabi" is a dance-pop song influenced with rock and punk elements. Lyrically, the song addresses the group's relationship with the media and the public in regards to the criticism they have faced during their careers. A music video for the song was released on 12 March 2020. In 2021, the song was certified silver in the United Kingdom by the British Phonographic Industry (BPI) and certified gold in Brazil. The song was named as the group's third biggest selling non single in the United Kingdom.

== Background and release ==
The song became viral on the video-sharing social platform, TikTok, in July 2019. After the song became viral, the group released a lyric video of the song on the group's YouTube channel consisting of viral videos using the song on 26 July 2019. A music video was also released on 12 March 2020, which was filmed during their LM5: The Tour, and includes behind-the-scenes footage from their tour bus, back stage, and different tour venues. However, the group had other plans regarding the concept of the music video for "Wasabi". In an interview with PopBuzz, Little Mix revealed that they wished to release the song as a single, and said that they had a music video concept for the song "ready to go" as well. Although the group did not specify the exact concept, Thirlwall went on to say, "We weren't afraid to say how we felt about certain people but we kind of did that on tour anyway for 'Wasabi'".

== Composition and lyrics ==
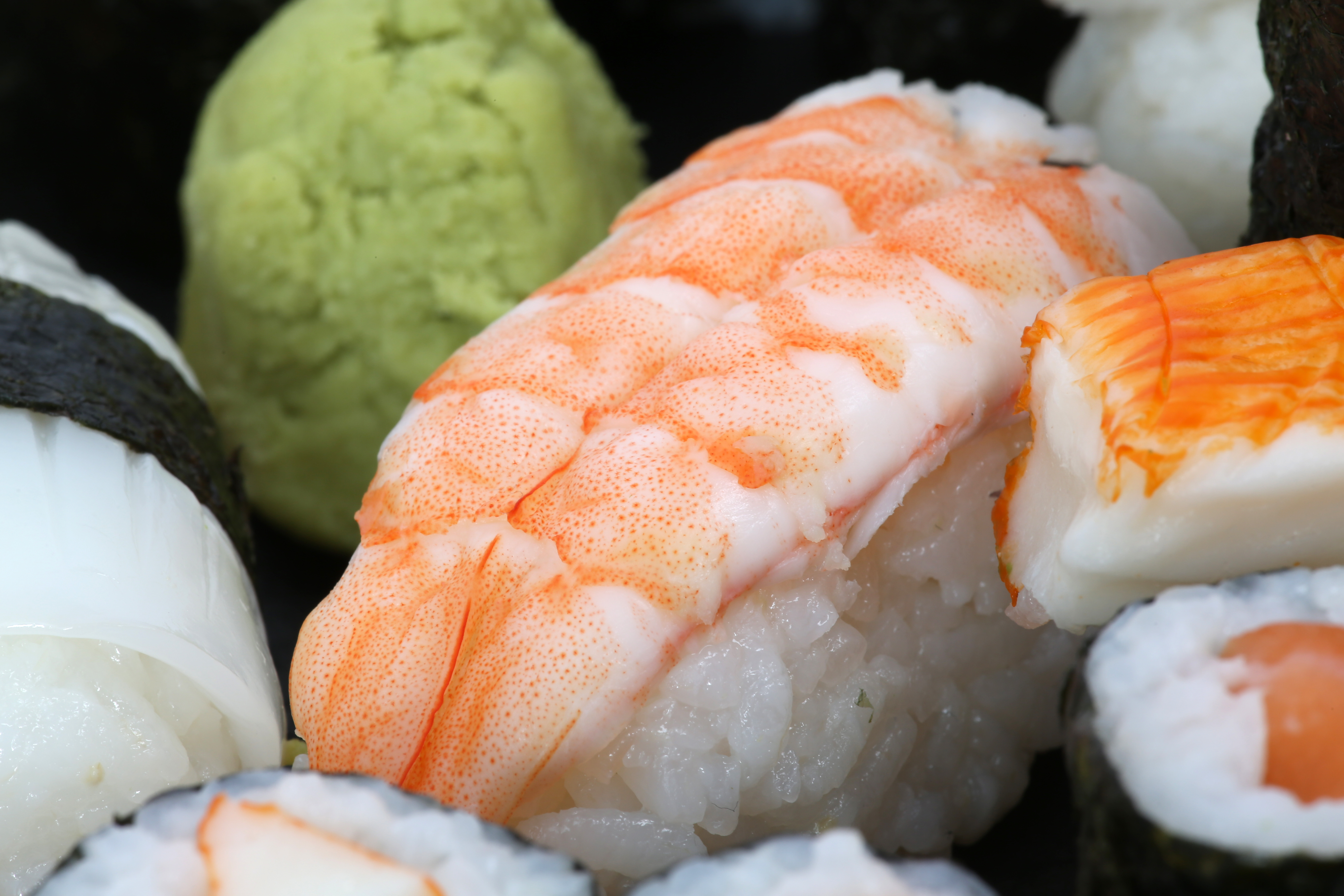
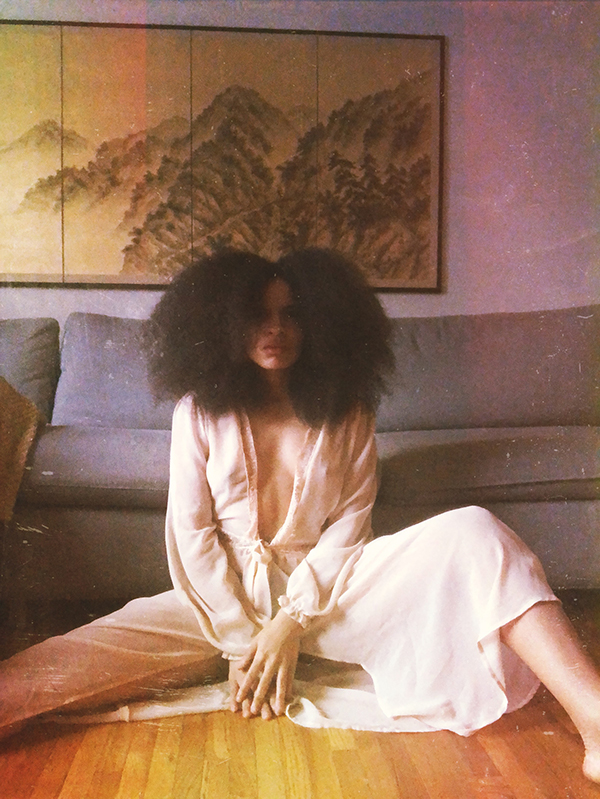
Jade Thirlwall drew inspiration to write the song after she saw Shungudzo (right) eating sushi and shovelling wasabi (left) in her mouth.

"Wasabi" is a dance-pop song influenced by 2000s minimal electronic beats with contemporary club beats. The song jumps between different genres featuring spoken word refrains that transition to "rock" and "punk-laced" riffs with R&B vocal harmonies. The song runs for a total length of 2 minutes and 34 seconds.

Lyrically, the song discusses about ignoring the haters and the negative things that the media write about the band. PopMatters went on to call the song as a 'reminder to ignore the critics and strive towards authenticity'. Thirlwall described the song as "a sassy song about being talked about all the time, good and bad". The song also contains lyrics of the common things people say about them with the quotes, "She ain't wearing no clothes", "When she goin' solo?", and "I bet they're gonna break up" included in the song.

According to an interview with Coup De Main magazine, co-writer and band member, Jade Thirlwall, drew inspiration to write the song after seeing Shungudzo, who also co-wrote the song, eating sushi and "shovelling wasabi in her mouth". Thirlwall asked her "How are you eating that?", and added "If that was me, I would just spit it out". She then continued by saying "Wait a minute! There's a song in that!".

== Critical reception ==
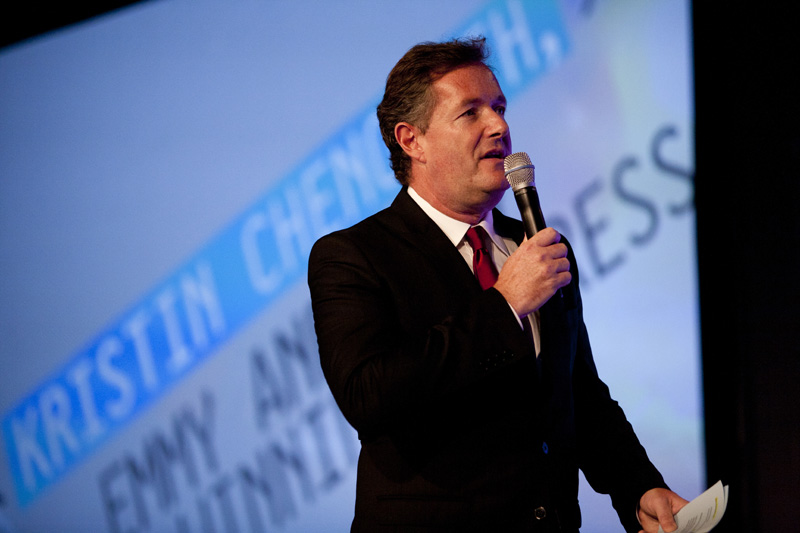
The "Wasabi" intro video features Piers Morgan (pictured) on the group's LM5 Tour performance as way of "clapping back" for his "slut-shaming" remarks towards them.

BuzzFeed's Matt Stopera, named the song "the best song they've ever recorded". He also said that the song is like a "big f*ck you to haters and people who suck". Alexis Petridis from The Guardian stated, "The vocals on Wasabi, meanwhile, are similarly daft but it’s still thrilling, jolting you from minimal electronics to an explosive, distorted guitar-driven middle-eight". Ross McNeilage MTV UK wrote that the song is "essentially Move's older, death-dropping sister".

Elisabeth Woronzoff of PopMatters said that "they have always advocated for combining empowerment and fun — and this is certainly where 'Wasabi' finds its allure". Writing for Idolator, Mike Nied stated that the song "hits back at haters over a frenetic, constantly evolving production" while also describing it as an "unhinged bop". Writing for Gay Times, Sam Damshenas described the song as a dance-pop anthem also writing that it was hailed by fans and critics as one of the best songs of their entire career. Matt Stopera from BuzzFeed also hailed it as one of the group's best single releases.

== Live performances ==
Little Mix performed "Wasabi" for the first time as a part of the setlist of their sixth concert tour, LM5: The Tour, in 2019. Before the song was performed on tour, a mash-up of videos by YouTubers and celebrities praising the group for using their platform to promote body positivity and female empowerment, served as an opener as they transition to the second segment of the show. A clip of Piers Morgan, a Good Morning Britain presenter, appeared amongst the videos with him asking the group to make a "public apology", after member Jesy Nelson called him a "silly twat" for slut-shaming the group. The group then rose to the stage via stage lift, and proceeded to the performance proper. They also performed the song on their GRLS Festival setlist, where they headlined the event on 7 March 2020 in Brazil.

After Nelson quit the group in December 2020, the other members chose to carry on as a trio, before later announcing in November 2021 that they would take an indefinite hiatus in 2022 to pursue solo careers. The group performed the song during the Confetti Tour in April and May 2022, with member Perrie Edwards singing Nelson's verse. From 2025, Thirlwall included "Wasabi" in her solo festival performances and on the setlist for her That's Showbiz Baby: the Tour, as part of a medley alongside her songs "It Girl" and "Midnight Cowboy". For her 2026 festival performances, Thirlwall placed "Wasabi" in another medley with two of her collaboration songs, "Gossip" and "Boy Crazy".

== Cover versions and usage in media ==
In 2019, Takada Kenta, a member from the South Korean duo JBJ95, performed the song during their concert in Osaka Japan. In 2021, South Korean singers Kim Chanmi and Kim Seol-hyun, from the girl group AOA, covered the song for Chanmi official YouTube channel. The song was featured on the season finale of the television series The Bold Type and is featured in the soundtrack of Just Dance 2024 Edition.

== Credits and personnel ==
Credits adapted from Tidal.

- Perrie Edwards – vocals, executive producer
- Jesy Nelson – vocals, executive producer
- Leigh-Anne Pinnock – vocals, executive producer
- Jade Thirlwall – vocals, songwriting, executive producer
- Alexandra Shungudzo Govere – songwriting
- MNEK – songwriting
- Mike Sabath – songwriting, production
- Joe Kearns – vocal production
- John Hill – production
- Bill Zimmerman – engineering
- Jason Elliott – engineering
- Randy Merrill – mastering
- Phil Tan – mixing

== Charts ==
Chart (2018–2019)	Peak position
Ireland (IRMA)	85
New Zealand Hot Singles (RMNZ)	19

== Certifications ==
Certifications for Wasabi
Region	Certification	Certified units/sales
Brazil (Pro-Música Brasil)	Gold	20,000^{‡}
New Zealand (RMNZ)	Gold	15,000^{‡}
United Kingdom (BPI)	Silver	245,000
^{‡} Sales+streaming figures based on certification alone.
