= Say Now =

British girl group

- Say Now in 2026; From left: Madeleine Haynes, Amelia Onuorah and Ysabelle Salvanera

Background information
- Also known as: Needanamebro
- Origin: London, England
- Genres: Pop; R&B
- Years active: 2022–present
- Label: Atlantic
- Publisher: Amlor Music • Universal Music Publishing Group
- Members: Ysabelle Salvanera; Amelia Onuorah; Madeleine Haynes
- Website: www.saynowsaynow.com

Say Now are a British girl group based in London. They consist of members Ysabelle Angeli, Amelia Onuorah and Madeleine Haynes, known as Maddie.

The group, formed as a duo without Haynes, initially went as Needanamebro, a name they decided on as the members had not been able to come up with a name for their group. After forming in 2022, they eventually debuted as Say Now a year later. Initially known for Y2K-era inspired R&B, they reinvented the sound of their music around 2026 after a more pop-inspired genre.

They are signed to Atlantic Records UK. They released their debut extended play, Say What You See, in 2026.

== History ==
=== 2022-2023: Formation and Needanamebro ===
We got scouted online. I used to post these music Reels with my friends from college, because I went to a music performing college. Our tour manager now — she was our manager at first — she emailed me. I just ignored it because I was like, "This is definitely a scam." Two weeks passed and then she followed up, and I was like, "Oh, shit. Okay." Amelia was the first person to be found by her, also off Instagram from a Billie Eilish cover.

Amelia and I met for the first time in our management's office. It was the first time I'd ever been to London properly. I was 17, Amelia was 18 at the time. And then Amelia was basically an A&R and found Maddie and just DM'd her and was like, "Oh my gosh, do you sing?"

— Yssy Salvanera, 2026

The group formed as a duo consisting of Ysabelle Salvanera and Amelia Onuorah, who met at age 17 and 18, respectively. who became signed to Atlantic Records UK. The pair met Madeleine Haynes through social media, with her subsequently joining the lineup of the group. All of the members quit their respective courses to join the group. The group is managed by Modest! Management, notable for managing the early careers of British pop groups One Direction and Little Mix. They gained attention online in 2022 with their cover of Drake's song "Massive". In 2023, the group released the singles "Better Love", "Not a Lot Left to Say", and "Netflix (Better Now Without You)". The UK's Official Charts Company praised "Not a Lot Left to Say", calling it "breezy bop par excellence" and a contender for "song of the summer".

=== 2023-2025: Debut of the Say Now name, singles ===
The group were untitled for their first year, releasing music under their temporary moniker needanamebro, but they revealed their official name via social media on 25 July 2023. In an interview with Glamour, they said that Love Always, Truth Say and GIRL (an acronym for Girls in Real Life) were almost chosen until Haynes suggested the name Say Now. As well as the announcement of their name being Say Now, they released a digital compilation album, Needanamebro. The track listing collated their singles released to date, as well as remixes, a snippet of a new song and their cover of "Massive".

At the 2024 Glamour Awards, the group won the Rising Star award. That same year, the group released singles including "Bitch Get Out My Car", "Trouble" and "Makeup Sex". The music video for "Trouble" featured Girls Aloud member Nadine Coyle. They also supported Kylie Minogue at BST Hyde Park in 2024. In February 2025, the group supported Omar Rudberg on the UK leg of his tour. That same month, they released the single "Don't Text Don't Call", a year after first teasing its chorus on social media. It was followed up by the singles "Forever", "Can't Keep a Beat" and "Brick By Brick". In October 2025, they released the song "Supermarket", as well as featuring as the cover stars of NME. That same month, they supported Jade for a London date of her 2025 concert tour. In November of that year, they had a concert tour in London. March 2026 saw them release the single "Millions". After performing on the main stage at the 2026 Mighty Hoopla festival at Brockwell Park, they also made their debut at the Reading and Leeds Festivals in August 2026.

=== 2026-present: Say What You See ===
In September, the group released the single "Met My Match", which was executive produced by PinkPantheress. It acted as the lead single from their debut extended play, Say What You See, released in November.

== Discography ==
=== Extended plays ===
List of extended plays, with selected details
Title	Details
Say What You See	Released: 13 November 2026; Label: Atlantic Records UK; Formats: Digital download, streaming, CD, LP

=== Compilations ===
List of compilations, with selected details
Title	Details
Needanamebro (Note: Credited as needanamebro)	Released: 26 July 2023; Label: Atlantic Records UK; Formats: Digital download, streaming

=== Singles ===
List of singles, showing year released and album name
Title	Year	Album
"Better Love"	2023	Needanamebro
"Not a Lot Left to Say"	2023	Needanamebro
"Netflix (Better Now Without You)"	2023	Needanamebro
"S.I.N.G.L.E."	2023	Non-album singles
"Bitch Get Out My Car"	2024	Non-album singles
"Trouble"	2024	Non-album singles
"Makeup Sex"	2024	Non-album singles
"Five Years"	2024	Non-album singles
"Don't Text Don't Call"	2025	Non-album singles
"Forever"	2025	Non-album singles
"Can't Keep a Beat"	2025	Non-album singles
"Brick by Brick"	2025	Non-album singles
"Supermarket"	2025	Non-album singles
"Millions"	2026	Non-album singles
"Met My Match"	2026	Say What You See
"Hot & Talking"	2026	Say What You See
"Girl of the Moment"	2026	Say What You See

== Members ==
- Ysabelle Salvanera – (2022–present)
- Amelia Onuorah – (2022–present)
- Madeleine Haynes – (2022–present)

== Awards and nominations ==
Year	Organisation	Category	Nominee(s)/work(s)	Result	Ref.
2024	Teen Vogue	12 Girl Groups to Watch in 2024	Say Now	Included	
2024	Glamour Awards	Rising Star	Say Now	Won	
2025	CelebMix	Artists to Watch	Say Now	Included	
2025	CelebMix Awards	Artist of the Year	Say Now	Nominated	
2025	CelebMix Awards	Music Video of the Year	"Brick by Brick"	Nominated	
2025	CelebMix Awards	Song of the Year	"Supermarket"	Nominated	
2025	Notion New Music Awards	Best New Pop	Say Now	Won	
