= Say What You See =

2026 EP by Say Now

EP by Say Now
- Released: 13 November 2026
- Genre: Electropop
- Length: 18:20
- Label: Atlantic UK
- Producers: PinkPantheress; Oscar Scheller; Count Baldor; Maestro

Singles from Say What You See
- 1. "Met My Match" Released: 18 September 2026; 2. "Hot & Talking" Released: 16 October 2026; 3. "Girl of the Moment" Released: 10 November 2026

Say What You See (stylised in sentence case) is the debut extended play by the British girl group Say Now. It was released on 13 November 2026 through Atlantic Records UK. The single was preceded by two singles: "Met My Match" and "Hot & Talking", as well as promotional single "Girl of the Moment".

A previous EP was scrapped by the group in favour of releasing the project, after which the group began working with PinkPantheress, who executive produced Say What You See. Her work was lauded by the members of Say Now; they felt their music had been elevated by her involvement and that the EP had helped Say Now to find their sound and branding. It was promoted by headline shows in Brooklyn, London and Manchester, as well as various festival appearances.

== Background ==
Say Now initially formed as a duo consisting of Ysabelle Salvanera and Amelia Onuorah, who became signed to Atlantic Records UK. They met Madeleine Haynes through social media, with her subsequently joining the line-up of the group. They were initially untitled for their first year as a group, releasing music under the temporary moniker Needanamebro, before revealing their name as Say Now in 2023. After releasing a string of singles, Say Now released a digital compilation album, Needanamebro. The track listing collated their singles released to date, as well as remixes, a snippet of a new song and a cover of Drake's "Massive".

Following a further string of singles, Say Now announced plans to release their debut body of work in early 2026. They predominantly worked with producer Oscar Scheller, using Destiny's Child as an inspiration, amongst other 2000s R&B music. However, after the group began working with PinkPantheress, they scrapped the iteration of the extended play they had worked on and began forming a new project. Scheller continued to work with the group on the new EP. Say Now admitted that they did not "claim" many of their earlier work, which The Fader described as "a bit gimmicky to modern ears", with the group billing single "Netflix" as "traumatising". They felt that Say What You See felt elevated compared to the initial iteration of the EP and felt true to the sound and branding they wanted to create for Say Now.

== Promotion and release ==
In 2026, Say Now made their debut at Mighty Hoopla festival at Brockwell Park, where they debuted "No Pyjamas" prior to its release. They also debuted at Reading and Leeds Festivals. In September, the group released the single "Met My Match" as the lead single from Say What You See. Say Now performed a free pop-up show at Baby's All Right in Brooklyn, New York City on 5 October. The 35-minute performance marked the group's U.S. debut as while as their first live renditions of "Met My Match", "Girl of the Moment" and "Hot & Talking". The set also included "No Pyjamas". After releasing "Hot & Talking" as the second single on 16 October, they announced the EP release date for 13 November. On the week of its release, "Girl of the Moment" was released as a promotional single, with the group featured on the cover of Apple Music's New Music Daily. The group also had a FaceTime interview with Zane Lowe on release day. The EP was supported with three live shows based in London and Manchester, set for December. Initially set to perform two, an extra show in London was added due to demand.

== Composition ==
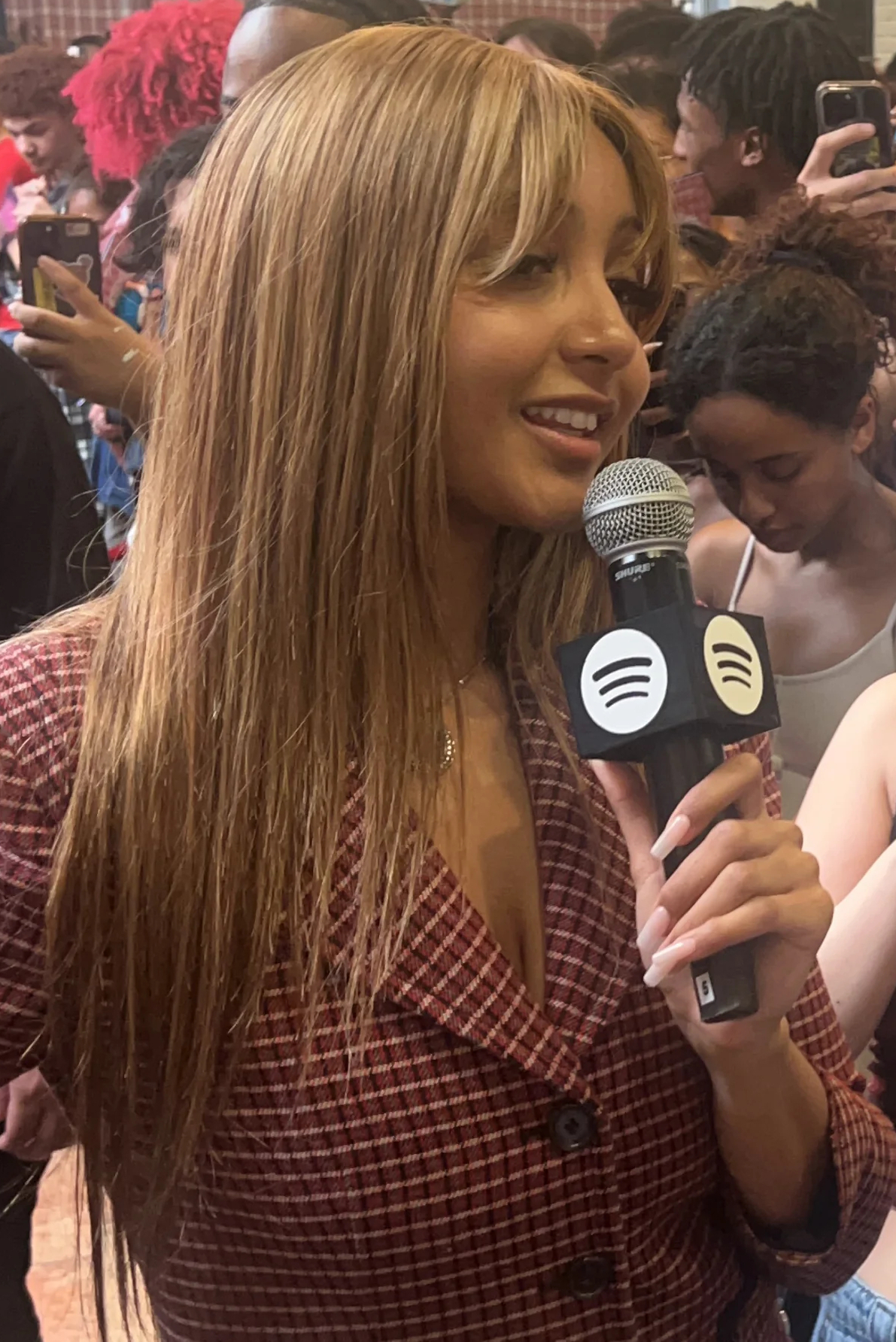
Say What You See was executive produced by PinkPantheress; Say Now lauded her work.

Say What You See was executive produced by PinkPantheress, who Salvanera described as "an older sister before you go to high school who can warn you about things". Haynes accredited her with expanding their taste horizon, having reintroduced them to music they grew up with and forgot about, such as one-hit wonders from the British music scene. They have admitted that since Say Now are best friends, they tend to consume the same music and appreciated PinkPantheress for showing them niche songs they would not have considered themselves as opposed to "any old generic 2000s big song". Anurorah also complimented PinkPantheress for her honesty; she felt she pushed Say Now's boundaries by being "brutally honest" about the music they were making and therefore creating a better project.

The EP opens with electropop track "Hot & Talking"; the song was inspired by British girl group Girls Aloud and sees Say Now direct their annoyance at their friendliness being mistaken for flirting. Say Now admitted that when they first heard the demo for the song, they found it "horrific". However, PinkPantheress told them that the song would be good for the project and was the best they had written; she reproduced it and added the bridge, which convinced them to release it. "No Pyjamas" follows and was described as a "slinky mix of hyperpop and Y2K-era beats".

"Met My Match", the third song on Say What You See, dissects being in a toxic relationship. On the track, Say Now sing about not only being able to survive the relationship, but also enjoy it, since they have met their match in somebody. "Pillow" follows as the fourth song and was billed as a "liquid UK garage update". "Money Man", the fifth track, was billed as a blend of the Pussycat Dolls and Britney Spears during her Circus era.

"Girl of the Moment, an "emotional ballad", closes out the EP. The song sees Say Now "wear their influences most proudly" and was likened to William Orbit's work with girl group All Saints. The song incorporates a spoken word segment from each member that was described as having "Kate Moss energy". The lyrical content of "Girl of the Moment" explores feeling highs in life and having the fear of a good thing ending. Say Now likened it to the feeling of crying on your birthday and "appreciating the fact that [something is] amazing but also scared of losing it".

== Track listing ==
Say What You See track listing
No.	Title	Writer(s)	Producer(s)	Length
1.	"Hot & Talking"	Madeleine Haynes; Ysabelle Salvanera; Amelia Onuorah; Katie Taylor; Oscar Scheller; Victoria Walker	PinkPantheress; Scheller; Count Baldor	3:11
2.	"No Pyjamas"	Haynes; Salvanera; Onuorah; Annie Schindel; Bava; Essien; Maestro	PinkPantheress; Baldor; Maestro	2:15
3.	"Met My Match"	Haynes; Salvanera; Onuorah; Ayodele Oyadare; Kelli-Marie; Mae Muller; Maestro; Nolais Ogbebor; Walker	PinkPantheress; Maestro; Scheller	2:45
4.	"Pillow"	Haynes; Salvanera; Onuorah; Alejandra Ghersi; Dominic Salole; James Essien; Kelela; Martin Simpson; Sean Foreman; Walker	PinkPantheress; Baldor	3:02
5.	"Money Man"	Thomas Parker; Walker	PinkPantheress	3:29
6.	"Girl of the Moment"	Haynes; Salvanera; Onuorah; Muller; Scheller; Walker	PinkPantheress; Scheller	3:35
Total length:				18:20

=== Notes ===
- All track titles are stylised in sentence case.

== Charts ==
Chart performance for Say What You See
Chart (2026)	Peak position
UK Album Downloads (Official Charts)	90
UK Homegrown (Official Charts)	25

== Release history ==
Release history
Region	Date	Format(s)	Version	Label	Ref.
Various	13 November 2026	digital download; streaming	Standard	Atlantic UK	
Various	22 January 2027	picture disc	Vertigo Vinyl Exclusive	Atlantic UK	
Various	29 January 2027	CD; vinyl LP	Standard	Atlantic UK	
