= Before You Break My Heart =

Song by Jade

from the album That's Showbiz Baby!
- Released: 12 September 2025
- Studio: Miloco, London
- Genre: Disco
- Length: 3:16
- Label: RCA
- Songwriters: Jade Thirlwall; Mike Sabath; Pablo Bowman; Brian Holland; Eddie Holland; Lamont Dozier
- Producer: Mike Sabath

Visualiser
- "Before You Break My Heart" on YouTube

"Before You Break My Heart" is a song by English singer Jade. It was released through RCA Records on 12 September 2025 as part of her first solo studio album That's Showbiz Baby!. The disco song was written by Jade, along with Pablo Bowman, and Mike Sabath, the latter of whom also produced it. Additional credits were given to songwriting and production team Holland–Dozier–Holland due to the song's interpolation of "Stop! In the Name of Love" (1965) by the Supremes.

It samples a recording of 8-year-old Jade singing "Stop! In the Name of Love" during an audition for British television talent series Stars in Their Eyes. Jade debuted the song before its release during her BBC Proms concert, accompanied by her niece, who also portrayed a younger version of the singer on the track's visualizer video, which was released alongside the visual album for That's Showbiz Baby!.

== Background ==
Following the song's release, Jade revealed that would not receive royalties from the song after being asked about how she was given permission to interpolate the Supremes' song on the track. She also explained that the song pays homage to Diana Ross, whom she described as her favorite artist, by prominently featuring the sample throughout the track.

== Composition ==
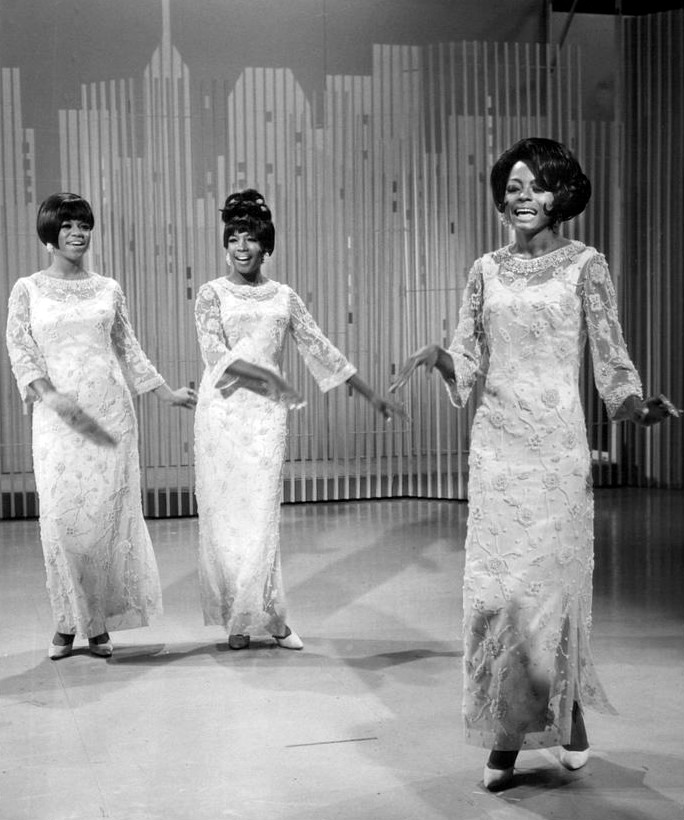
"Before You Break My Heart" interpolates "Stop! In the Name of Love" by the Supremes (pictured).

"Before You Break My Heart" is described as a disco song. The track samples vocals from 8-year-old Jade's audition for British television talent series Stars in Their Eyes singing "Stop! In the Name of Love" by the Supremes.

What's really special about that is the chorus vocal is actually me as a child singing [that song]. It's about me not forgetting my younger self and losing sight of that in this showbiz world. I was showing Mike [Sabath, producer] loads of different childhood videos [...] and I played him [one of] me dressed as Diana Ross singing "Stop! In the Name of Love" and that just inspired the song.

— Jade, NME

== Critical reception ==
Puah Ziwei of NME described the song as "groovy" and Jade's vocal delivery as "oft-vulnerable". David Cobbald of The Line of Best Fit described the song as "more than well worth the listen" and highlighted its interpolation of "Stop! In the Name of Love", calling it a "perfect example of good sampling". Writing for DIY, Daisy Carter praised the track as an "impossibly catchy instant-classic", comparing Jade's career trajectory to that of Diana Ross and describing the song as casting Jade as Ross' "natural successor".

== Promotion ==
On 12 September 2025, Jade premiered a compilation of visualisers for all tracks on That's Showbiz Baby, describing it as a visual album. It was shot in South Shields by director Niyadre on the same day as Jade's BBC Proms show alongside Jade's niece, who portrayed a younger version of the singer.

=== Live performances ===
On 25 July 2025, Jade performed an orchestral concert for BBC Proms at the Glasshouse, accompanied by the Royal Northern Sinfonia. After the show's radio broadcast, Jade was joined by her niece to perform "Before You Break My Heart" before the song's release. The performance was later broadcast as part of the BBC Two special Jade at the Proms: A Homecoming on 8 November 2025. It was also part of the setlist of Jade's first solo concert tour, That's Showbiz Baby: the Tour. In 2026, Jade performed the track at several music festivals, including Primavera Sound, Open'er Festival and Electric Picnic.

== Credits and personnel ==
The credits were adapted from the liner notes of That's Showbiz Baby!.

=== Locations ===
- Recorded at Miloco Studios, London
- Mixed at MixStar Studios, Virginia Beach
- Mastered at Becker Mastering, Pasadena

=== Personnel ===
- Jade Thirlwall – vocals, songwriting
- Ramera Abraham – additional vocal engineering
- Dale Becker – mastering
- Pablo Bowman – songwriting
- Adam Burt – mastering assisting
- Alex Ghenea – mixing
- Brian Holland – songwriting
- Eddie Holland – songwriting
- Mike Sabath – drums, keys, synth, bass, guitar, producer, engineering, songwriting
- Lamont Dozier – songwriting
- Nate Mingo – mastering assisting

== Charts ==
Chart performance
Chart (2026)	Position
Portugal Airplay (AFP)	36
