= FUFN (Fuck You for Now) =

Single by Jade

from the album That's Showbiz Baby!
- B-side: "It Girl"
- Released: 14 March 2025
- Genre: Electropop
- Length: 3:35
- Label: RCA
- Composers: Dave Hamelin; David Karbal
- Lyricists: Jade Thirlwall; Rachel Keen
- Producers: Dave Hamelin; Lostboy

Jade singles chronology
"Fantasy" (2025)	"FUFN (Fuck You for Now)" (2025)	"Hot" (English version remix) (2025)

Music video
- "FUFN (Fuck You for Now)" on YouTube

"FUFN (Fuck You for Now)" is a song by English singer Jade. It was released through RCA Records on 14 March 2025, as the fifth single from her debut solo studio album That's Showbiz Baby! (2025). Described as unfiltered and from her own narrative, the song peaked at number 25 on the UK Singles Chart.

== Background and release ==
In an interview with Wonderland before the song's release, Thirlwall revealed that the song was made with Dave Hamelin and Raye in Los Angeles. She also described it as her "most straight down-the-line pop song". The song was inspired by a dream that Jade experienced about her boyfriend Jordan Stephens cheating on her. After waking up the next day "fuming", Thirlwall wrote down the concept of the song and took it to Raye, and they brainstormed on making the song about a big argument which is not necessarily the end of a relationship but just a moment where the woman needs to vent her anger at her boyfriend until it eventually passes. The song's title, originally just "Fuck U for Now", engendered "a lot of back and forth" with Thirlwall's record label, RCA Records. She would eventually agree to add the "FUFN" acronym in order to make the song "a little friendlier".

The song's release was hinted at during the Brit Awards 2025 in Thirlwall's performance of "Angel of My Dreams". A dancer briefly exposed his buttocks, where one cheek had been painted with the letters "FUFN". Shortly after the show, she revealed to Capital the track was "ready to go" and that it would be announced the following week. She would later announce the song's upcoming release on 4 March 2025.

== Composition and lyrics ==
"FUFN (Fuck You for Now)" was written by Jade Thirlwall, Raye, Dave Hamelin and David Karbal. The song was produced by Hamelin and Lostboy.

== Promotion and reception ==
"FUFN (Fuck You for Now)" was first teased on 12 February 2025 in a Fendi commercial campaign starring Thirlwall for the Mamma Baguette bag. A snippet of the track was posted on Jade's social media accounts on 26 February 2025.

The music video for the song was directed by Lucrecia and released on Jade's YouTube channel on 14 March 2025. The video features Jade attending a premiere of her movie with her boyfriend, played by Connor Finch, whilst feeling bitter about a recent argument they both had and imagining herself pushing him away with her powers. Nick Grimshaw made a cameo as the host of the movie premiere, and Jade's real-life boyfriend Jordan Stephens made a cameo during the end of the video as a fan who compliments Jade's movie. The video was largely filmed on-site at Broadway Cinema in Letchworth.

Sarah Jamieson of DIY described "FUFN (Fuck You for Now)" as trying to "emulate the gloriously heady heights of Lady Gaga's The Fame Monster, with its slinky, reflective verses soon making way for a dizzying, thumping chorus. It's a ballsy offering that continues to prove Jade is one of the most enticing and fresh voices in pop right now".

Jade began performing "FUFN (Fuck You for Now)" during several festivals over the summer of 2025, including BBC Radio 1's Big Weekend on 25 May 2025, the 2025 edition of Mighty Hoopla on 31 May 2025, Capital's Summertime Ball on 15 June 2025 and Glastonbury Festival 2025 on 28 June 2025. On both the Radio 1 and the Summertime Ball performances, Jade substituted the middle-8 section for an audience chant of "FUFN". For other festival performances including Glastonbury, Jade used this section to instead call out social issues, such as the justification of genocide, the right-wing populist political party Reform UK, and transphobia.

== Charts ==
=== Weekly charts ===
Weekly chart performance for "FUFN (Fuck You for Now)"
Chart (2025)	Peak position
Croatia International Airplay (Top lista)	64
Estonia Airplay (TopHit)	21
Ireland (IRMA)	84
Latvia Airplay (TopHit)	6
Lithuania Airplay (TopHit)	18
Malta Airplay (Radiomonitor)	8
New Zealand Hot Singles (RMNZ)	28
North Macedonia Airplay (Radiomonitor)	17
Slovakia Airplay (ČNS IFPI)	54
UK Singles (Official Charts)	25

=== Monthly charts ===
Monthly chart performance for "FUFN (Fuck You for Now)"
Chart (2025)	Position
Estonia Airplay (TopHit)	43
Latvia Airplay (TopHit)	9

=== Year-end charts ===
Year-end chart performance
Chart (2025)	Position
Latvia Airplay (TopHit)	22

== Release history ==
"FUFN (Fuck You for Now)" release history
Region	Date	Version	Format	Label	Ref.
Various	14 March 2025	Original	7-inch vinyl; cassette; CD; digital download; streaming	RCA	
Italy	21 March 2025	Original	Radio airplay	Sony Italy	
Various	28 March 2025	For the Club	Digital download; streaming	RCA	
Various	2 May 2025	Acoustic	Digital download; streaming	RCA	
