= Mike Sabath =

American record producer, songwriter, and musician

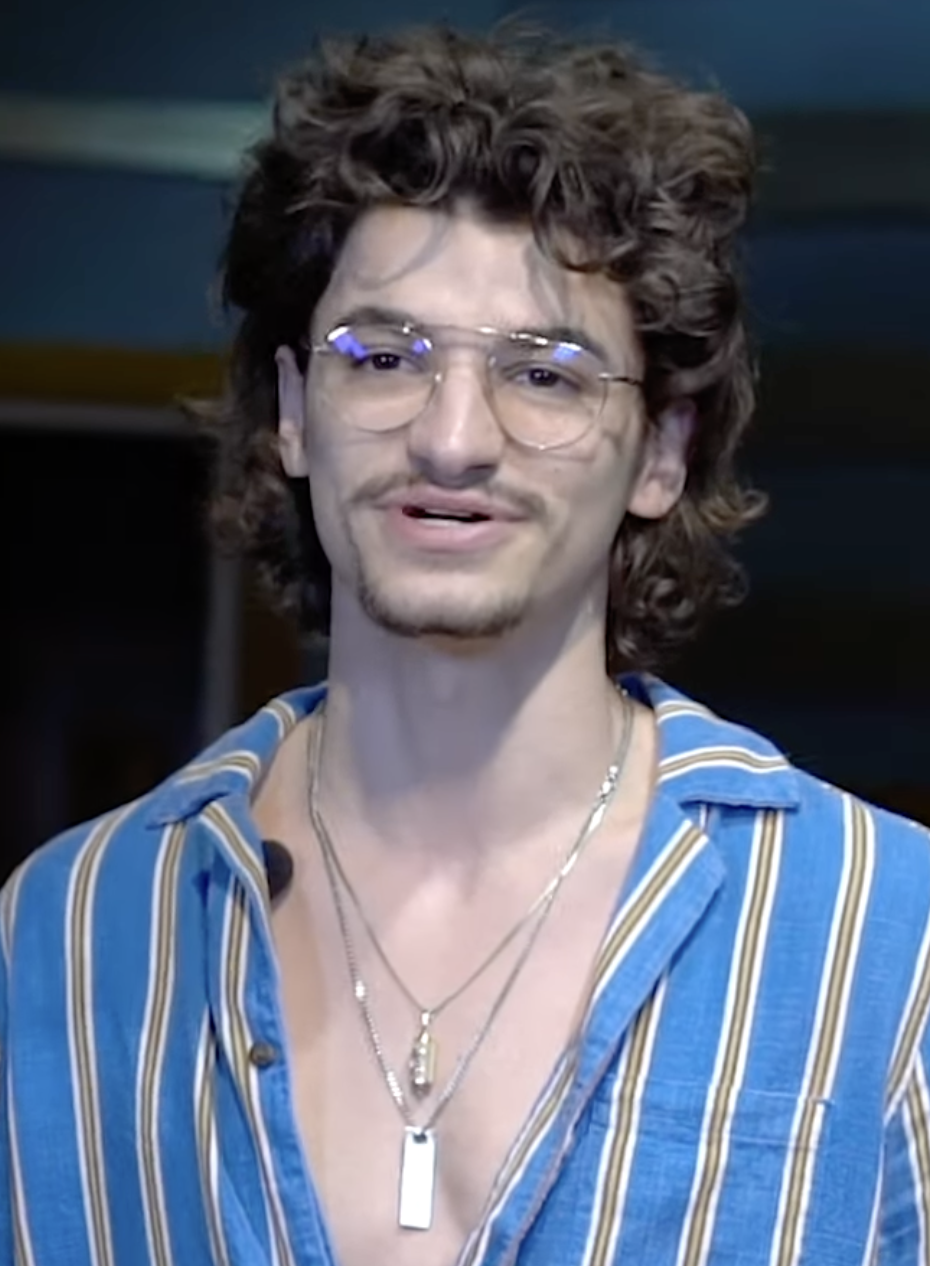
- Sabath in 2023

Background information
- Born: February 24, 1998 (age 28); New York, New York
- Occupations: Record producer; songwriter; singer; multi-instrumentalist
- Label: Warner
- Member of: The Moongirls

Michael Harris Sabath is an American record producer, songwriter, and musician. He is the frontman of the band The Moongirls, and has a concurrent career in production and songwriting for other artists.

He has worked with Shawn Mendes, Lizzo, Meghan Trainor, Raye, Liam Payne, Little Mix (including solo project(s); notably, Jade Thirlwall), the Jonas Brothers, Sabrina Carpenter, Camila Cabello and Selena Gomez, among other artists. He was nominated for five 2027 Grammy awards in November 2026.

== Early life and education ==
Sabath was born and raised in Westchester County, New York. His parents, Karen and Bruce Sabath, were financiers; Bruce later left finance to become an actor. He started to sing as a child, and learned to play piano, guitar, clarinet, and drums. In 7th grade, to benefit the charity Ability Beyond Disability, he wrote a song titled "Hand in Hand" which he recorded with a chorus of 140 kids. "Hand in Hand" raised more than $5000 for the charity through online sales and donations. A year later, he wrote, arranged and recorded "Talk About It" to raise funds for the Westchester Mental Health Association.

Sabath attended John Jay High School and as a student wrote and recorded music every night. He applied to and was accepted at Harvard, but deferred admission to focus on music full-time.

== Career ==
=== 2016-2023: Career beginnings ===
Sabath took a leave of absence from high school in his senior year to write and record in Los Angeles. By then, he had a manager, Don Isaac, and an agent, who also represented Justin Bieber. In early 2017, he signed a publishing deal with Sony/ATV Publishing, and later that year attended a multi-day Sony/ATV publishing camp. While there, he wrote "Get Loud for Me" with the singer Gizzle. The song was used in an NFL/Bose commercial, and became a hit: it was streamed more than 4.4 million times, and added to 67,000 playlists. "Get Loud for Me" was later used in ads for Adidas and the Need for Speed Payback video game. He also co-wrote Daphne Willis' "Do It Like This", at the Sony/ATV camp; it was used in commercials for Comcast/Xfinity and became a "phenomenon" in South Korea.

In 2018, Sabath wrote and produced "Familiar" for Liam Payne's debut album, LP1. Recorded with Payne and J Balvin, "Familiar" charted at #25 in the US and #14 in the UK, where it remained on the Top 40 charts for 19 weeks. He had similar success in 2019 as a co-writer on "I Can't Get Enough" by Selena Gomez, J Balvin, Benny Blanco, and Tainy.

In 2019, in addition to writing and producing music with artists including Lizzo, the Jonas Brothers, Carlie Hanson and DJ Snake, Sabath co-wrote, produced, and appeared on Meghan Trainor's "Wave," the second single from her third major-label studio album, Treat Myself (2020). He performed on Ellen and The Voice with Trainor following the single's release. He also signed with Warner Records in 2019.

In September 2020, his song "Good Energy" was selected to be in the soundtrack for the popular video game series FIFA's latest installment, FIFA 21.

=== 2023-present: Raye, Being Human and The Moongirls, bird songs in Australia, Jade Thirlwall ===
In February 2023, Raye's debut album My 21st Century Blues was released, on which Sabath co-produced or produced all of the tracks but Black Mascara. This album went on to win one of Raye's record-breaking 7 BRIT Awards in 2024, British Album Of The Year. In March 2023, Sabath announced the release of his debut studio album, Being Human with his band The Moongirls. It was released on April 28, 2023 via Warner Records. In September of that year, a standalone single "Life" was released via his own record label. In November of the following year in collaboration with Bird Life Australia, Sabath released an album of recorded bird sounds during his time in Australia. In 2024, Sabath produced Jade Thirlwall's debut single, Angel Of My Dreams. (Jade says in the opening lyrics of the song: "Hey Mike, let's do something crazy!") This would be the lead single for her debut album, That's Showbiz Baby, on which Sabath produced more tracks, including the singles Fantasy & Unconditional, as well as the song Before You Break My Heart. He also co-produced the tracks Headache (with Claude Vause) and Silent Disco (with Raye and Jonah Christian).

In November 2026, he was nominated for five 2027 Grammy awards, including Producer of the Year. He was also nominated for Song of the Year, Record of the Year and Album of the Year as a songwriter and producer on the Raye album This Music May Contain Hope.

== Selected production discography ==
Partially adapted from AllMusic.

Year	Artist	Title	Credit
2016	Nebbra	"You"	Featured artist, composer
2017	Sabath	Songs I Write	Primary artist
2017	Jordan Fisher	"Mess"	Producer (with JQue Smith, DeWain Whitmore)
2017	Tayler Buono	"Who Am I"	Producer
2017	Gizzle	"Get Loud For Me	Producer
2017	Gizzle	"Let’s Go"	Producer
2017	Daphne Willis	"Do It Like This"	Producer
2018	Bea Miller	"Bored"	Composer, producer
2018	Liam Payne, J Balvin	"Familiar"	Composer, producer
2018	Little Mix	"Notice"	Composer, producer
2018	Little Mix	"Wasabi"	Composer, producer
2018	Sabrina Carpenter	"Hold Tight"	Composer, producer
2018	Next Town Down	"Easy"	Composer, producer
2018	Next Town Down	"Roll"	Composer, producer
2018	Next Town Down	"Rock"	Composer, producer
2018	Carlie Hanson	"Numb"	Producer
2018	King Jet	"Lifeguard"	Producer, composer
2018	Madison Beer	"Hurts Like Hell" (featuring Offset)	Composer, producer
2018	PrettyMuch	"Jello"	Composer, producer
2019	Alma	"When I Die"	Producer, composer
2019	Benny Blanco, Tainy, Selena Gomez, J Balvin	"I Can't Get Enough"	Composer
2019	Lizzo	"Stayin Alive"	Composer, producer
2019	Lizzo	"Exactly How I Feel" (featuring Gucci Mane)	Composer, producer
2019	Sabrina Carpenter	"In My Bed"	Composer, producer
2019	Bea Miller	"Feel Something"	Composer, producer
2019	Meghan Trainor	"Wave"	Featured artist, producer, composer
2019	Meghan Trainor	"Genetics"	Composer, producer
2019	Jonas Brothers	"Hesitate"	Composer, producer
2019	Jonas Brothers	"First"	Composer, producer
2019	DJ Snake	"Fuego"	Composer
2020	Meghan Trainor	"Holidays" (featuring Earth, Wind & Fire)	Composer, producer
2021	Zara Larsson	"Talk About Love" (featuring Young Thug)	Composer, producer
2021	Camila Cabello	"Don't Go Yet"	Composer, producer, background vocals
2021	Shawn Mendes	"It'll Be Okay"	Composer, producer
2022	Raye	"Hard Out Here."	Composer, producer
2022	Raye	"Escapism."	Composer, producer
2023	Raye	"Ice Cream Man."	Composer, producer
2023	Niall Horan	"If You Leave Me"	Composer
2024	Jade Thirlwall	"Angel Of My Dreams"	Composer, producer, bass, synthesizer, engineer, drums, guitar, background vocals
2024	Jade Thirlwall	"Fantasy"	Composer, producer
2024	Jade Thirlwall	"Before You Break My Heart"	Composer, producer
2025	Empress Of	"Blasting Through the Speakers"	Composer, producer
2025	Raye	"Where Is My Husband!"	Composer, producer
2026	Raye, Hans Zimmer	"Click Clack Symphony"	Composer, producer
2026	Meghan Trainor	"Cry Baby"	Composer, producer
2026	Meghan Trainor	"Hush"	Composer, producer
