= It Girl (Jade Thirlwall song) =

Promotional single by Jade

from the album That's Showbiz Baby!
- A-side: "FUFN (Fuck You for Now)"
- Written: 9 February 2023
- Released: 10 January 2025
- Recorded: Cirkut City, Los Angeles; Miloco, London
- Genre: Electropop
- Length: 2:33
- Label: RCA
- Composers: Henry Walter; Peter Rycroft
- Lyricists: Jade Thirlwall; James Abrahart; Lauren Aquilina
- Producers: Cirkut; Lostboy

Jade promotional singles chronology
"Midnight Cowboy" (2024)	"It Girl" (2025)	"Frozen" (2025)

Visualiser video
- "It Girl" on YouTube

"It Girl" is a song by English singer Jade. It was released through RCA Records on 10 January 2025, as the second promotional single (Note: Following the announcement of "FUFN (Fuck You for Now)", the Official Charts Company referred to it as Jade's "official third single" with "Angel of My Dreams" and "Fantasy" being the first two. "It Girl" was also referred to as a "promo track".) from her debut solo studio album That's Showbiz Baby! (2025), which is derived from a lyric in this song. Inspired by her experiences in the music industry, she co-wrote the song with James Abrahart and Lauren Aquilina, and its producers Cirkut and Lostboy.

== Background and release ==
The song initially teased at the end of her "Angel of My Dreams" music video without a title, was referenced under the name "It Girl" by fans. She later stated in a post on X that she changed the song's title from its original name, "That's Showbiz, Baby", after fans began referring to the track by that title. Preceding the song's release, Thirlwall described the song throughout various interviews as the "cunty little sister" of "Angel of My Dreams". On 16 December 2024, she announced the release of the single, alongside a pre-save link.

The song was also released as the B-side on vinyl record editions of "FUFN (Fuck You for Now)" and "Angel of My Dreams".

== Composition and lyrics ==
"It Girl" was co-written by Jade Thirlwall, JHart and Lauren Aquilina on 9 February 2023, as revealed by Thirlwall. The production of the track was handled by Cirkut and Lostboy. Musically, it has been described as an electropop song.

== Reception ==
During an early listening session, Olive Pometsey of The Face described the song, as "Angel of My Dreams' more crystallised, clubrat sister". Annabel Nugent of The Independent described it as "a hard and fast electro-pop bop about being poked and prodded, papped and penalised as a woman in the spotlight". Shahzaib Hussain of Clash described "It Girl" as "a melodramatic anthem whereby Jade purges her own experience being exploited as a pliable, young female artist." Writing for Billboard, Jason Lipshutz described "It Girl" as a song which "immediately showcases Jade's expansive voice before slamming into thick drums and wobbly harmonies—creating a sonic juxtaposition that worked so well with her breakthrough track, and once again succeeds here."

== Promotion ==
A snippet was briefly teased on the visualizer for "Midnight Cowboy". She once again played snippets of the song at surprise club appearances throughout the rest of 2024. The song's release date and cover were eventually announced on 3 January 2025 in a social media post, accompanied by a visual snippet.

"It Girl" was featured as the song in the "lip sync for the win" segment of the seventh episode of RuPaul's Drag Race UK series 8 between contestants Naya Thorn and Coral-Hole Mandi. Naya Thorn won the lip sync and thus the challenge.

== Music video ==
The music video (Note: Labelled as a "visualiser" on YouTube) for "It Girl" was filmed in London on 29 June 2024. It was directed by Fa & Fon, who previously worked with Jade on the visualiser for "Midnight Cowboy". In the lead up to release, Thirlwall was seen filming promotional videos at various locations, including: Piccadilly Circus and Soho. The video premiered on 10 January 2025.

== Charts ==
Chart performance
Chart (2025)	Peak position
New Zealand Hot Singles (RMNZ)	13
UK Singles (Official Charts)	44
