= Gossip (Confidence Man and Jade Thirlwall song) =

Single by Confidence Man and Jade
- Released: 23 July 2025
- Genre: Dance-pop; acid house
- Length: 3:19
- Label: Chaos; I Oh You
- Songwriters: Aidan Moore; Jade Thirlwall; Grace Stephenson; Lewis Stephenson
- Producer: Reggie Goodchild

Confidence Man singles chronology
"Far Out" (Orbital remix) (2025)	"Gossip" (2025)	"Brand New Me" (2025)

Jade singles chronology
"Plastic Box" (2025)	"Gossip" (2025)	"Unconditional" (2025)

Music video
- "Gossip" on YouTube

"Gossip" is a song by Australian band Confidence Man and English singer Jade. It was released through Chaos and I Oh You Records on 23 July 2025. Commercially, the song peaked at number 25 on the UK Dance Singles Charts. Two remixes of the song, by disc jockeys Chris Lake and Bullet Tooth respectively, were released as part of Confidence Man's extended play Active Scenes Vol One (2025).

"Gossip" was voted in at number 93 on the 2025 Triple J Hottest 100. At the AIR Awards of 2026, it was nominated for Best Independent Dance / Club Single.

== Background and release ==
In December 2024, Confidence Man and Jade met for the first time at the Rolling Stone awards in the UK. The following year on 28 June 2025, "Gossip" had its debut performance at Glastonbury during Jade's set at the Woodsie stage. A month later, the band announced the release of the song, along with the single artwork. On 23 July, it was played for the first time on BBC Radio 1. An accompanying music video for "Gossip", was directed by India Harris, and released on the same day as the single's release. On 5 December 2025, two remixes of "Gossip" were released on Confidence Man's extended play Active Scenes Vol One, produced by English disc jockeys Chris Lake and Bullet Tooth, respectively.

== Composition ==
For NME, Liberty Dunworth described it as a dance-pop anthem. Writing for Dork, Sam Taylor noted that it combined elements of dance-pop with acid house music. The song was written by Sugar Bones (Aiden Moore), Janet Planet (Grace Stephenson) and Reggie Goodchild (Lewis Stephenson) of Confidence Man along with Jade. Reggie Goodchild also produced the song.

== Reception ==
Ahead of its release, Liberty Dunworth wrote "It combines the attitude of acid house, the beats of dance and the tongue-in-cheek playfulness of pop." Writing for Clash, Robin Murray described it as "the perfect blend of Confidence Man club raunch and Jade's pop effervescence." For DIY, Daisy Carter called it a "sassy, strutting new joint number which is sure to be the song on everyone's lips for the rest of summer."

== Track listing ==
- Streaming/digital download
1. "Gossip" – 3:19
- Streaming/digital download – extended & dub
1. "Gossip" (extended mix) – 4:34
2. "Gossip" (dub version) – 6:12
- Streaming/digital download – DumitrEscu remix
1. "Gossip" (featuring Jade; DumitrEscu remix) – 3:12
- Streaming/digital download – Juicy Romance remix
1. "Gossip" (featuring Jade; Juicy Romance remix) – 3:40
- Streaming/digital download – Harvey Sutherland remix
1. "Gossip" (featuring Jade; Harvey Sutherland remix) – 4:27

== Charts ==
Chart (2025)	Peak position
UK Singles Downloads (OCC)	32
UK Dance (OCC)	25

== Release history ==
Region	Date	Version	Format	Label	Ref.
Various	23 July 2025	Original	Digital download; streaming	Chaos	
Various	22 August 2025	Extended & dub	Digital download; streaming	Chaos	
Various	29 August 2025	DumitrEscu remix	Digital download; streaming	Chaos	
Various	24 October 2025	Juicy Romance remix	Digital download; streaming	Chaos	
Various	31 December 2025	Harvey Sutherland remix	Digital download; streaming	Chaos	
