= Midnight Cowboy (Jade Thirlwall song) =

Promotional single by Jade

from the album That's Showbiz Baby
- A-side: "Fantasy"
- Released: 25 September 2024
- Recorded: 2022
- Genre: Pop; electronica
- Length: 3:32
- Label: RCA
- Composers: Jade Thirlwall; Rachel Keen; Jonah Christian
- Lyricists: Thirlwall; Keen
- Producers: Christian; Stephen Mykal

Jade promotional singles chronology
"Midnight Cowboy" (2024)	"It Girl" (2025)

Visualiser video
- "Midnight Cowboy" on YouTube

"Midnight Cowboy" is a song by English singer and songwriter Jade. It was released on 25 September 2024, through RCA Records, as the first promotional single from her debut solo studio album, That's Showbiz Baby (2025). Alongside Jonah Christian, Jade co-wrote the song with English singer-songwriter Raye, whom she worked with while in Little Mix. It features a cameo speaking verse from Scottish actor Ncuti Gatwa, with references made to Edward Enninful and the non-binary community. It debuted at number ninety-three on the Official UK Charts. It's the B-side track of "Fantasy".

== Background and release ==
"Midnight Cowboy" was first teased on 23 September 2024 after Scottish actor Ncuti Gatwa posted a teaser to his Instagram page. The following day, Jade announced on her social media pages that she would be releasing a surprise track ahead of her second single release for her fans. A visualizer for the song was released the same day where the song "It Girl", could be heard playing at the beginning of the video.

== Composition and lyrics ==
"Midnight Cowboy" was written and composed by Jade Thirlwall, Rachel Keen, and Jonah Christian in 2022, with production handled by Stephen Mykal. It had been described by Jade as a song "owning your sexuality", which incorporates a spoken word verse by Scottish actor Ncuti Gatwa. The lyrics reference Edward Enninful and the non-binary community.

Critics described it as a pop and electronica song that incorporates elements of 2000s R&B. The lyrics also reference the 1969 film Midnight Cowboy and the 1953 film Calamity Jane.

== Charts ==
Chart performance for "Midnight Cowboy"
Chart (2024)	Peak position
UK Singles (Official Charts)	93
