= Angel of My Dreams =

Single by Jade

from the album That's Showbiz Baby!
- Released: 19 July 2024
- Genre: Pop; electronica; dance-pop; electroclash
- Length: 3:17
- Label: RCA
- Composers: Jade Thirlwall; Steph Jones; Mike Sabath; Pablo Bowman; Bill Martin; Phil Coulter
- Lyricists: Jade Thirlwall; Steph Jones; Pablo Bowman
- Producer: Mike Sabath

Jade singles chronology
| "Angel of My Dreams" (2024) | "Fantasy" (2024) |

Music video
- "Angel of My Dreams" on YouTube

"Angel of My Dreams" is the first solo single by English singer Jade. It was released on 19 July 2024, through RCA Records, marking her first solo endeavour after her band Little Mix began a hiatus in May 2022. It is the lead single from her debut studio album, That's Showbiz Baby! (2025). Jade co-wrote the song with Steph Jones, Pablo Bowman and its producer Mike Sabath. Because the song samples and interpolates 1967 Eurovision Song Contest winning song "Puppet on a String" by English singer Sandie Shaw, Bill Martin and Phil Coulter received writing credits.

"Angel of My Dreams" received widespread acclaim from critics with praise given towards the track lyrics, use of sample, and exploration of different genres. It was included on various mid-year and year-end rankings of the best songs of 2024, including by Billboard and The Independent. It addresses Jade's complex relationship with the music industry.

The music video pays homage to Jade's hometown of South Shields, and features home footage from her childhood including her audition from The X Factor. The music video was inspired by the films The Fifth Element, Black Swan and Showgirls. At the 2025 Brit Awards, it was nominated for Song of the Year.

== Background and release ==
After Little Mix went on a previously announced hiatus following the conclusion of the Confetti Tour in May 2022, Jade began working on her solo projects and music. On 2 July 2024, she revealed the artwork and the release date of "Angel of My Dreams" to all of her and her team's social media accounts. The single and its accompanying music video were released on 19 July 2024. On the same day, Jade's name and the name of the song were projected onto the Angel of the North sculpture to commemorate the release.

The track was also made available for purchase as a 7-inch vinyl single, a cassette single and a CD single through Jade's online store. On 9 August 2024, Jade released a "Slow. Angelic. Dramatic." version of the track, along with an official live performance being uploaded onto her YouTube channel. A remix version with American DJ the Blessed Madonna was also released.

== Composition and lyrics ==
"Angel of My Dreams" was co-written during a studio session in Los Angeles, alongside Steph Jones, Pablo Bowman and producer Mike Sabath, whom she worked with whilst still in Little Mix. Musically, it incorporates elements of pop, electronica, electroclash, and dance-pop, and samples Sandie Shaw's song "Puppet on a String"—United Kingdom's winning entry in the Eurovision Song Contest 1967. Bill Martin and Phil Coulter who co-wrote "Puppet on a String" were also given writing credits.

Upon the song's release, Jade said: "I want people to be like 'oh my god, I didn't expect that' – but then want to listen again". She added: "I didn't want to do a safe first single, that was really important to me. I'm setting the tone of who I am as an artist on my own". Some commentators speculated over references made to her past career, particularly the lyrics "Sold my soul to a psycho" with the term "psycho" alluding to Syco Entertainment, a record label that Little Mix was previously signed to from 2011 and 2018. Jade told Beat Magazine that she did not intend to disparage her time with Syco but she wanted the lyrics and production of the song to reflect her overall journey navigating the music industry.

== Music video ==
The video for "Angel of My Dreams" was directed by Aube Perrie and filmed in London in April 2024. Among the filming locations were Deptford High Street and the Laban building. It details the story of Jade's career in the music industry and opens with a shot of her walking alongside a busy high street, reminiscent of her hometown of South Shields. In the video, she is seen busking on the high street, before it transitions into different scenes where she plays various personas. It features home footage of JADE performing as a child and includes clips from when she auditioned for The X Factor UK. Inspirations for the video were also drawn from the films Showgirls (1995), The Fifth Element (1997) and Black Swan (2010). Speaking to Billboard, Jade shared that Britney Spears's video for "Lucky' was also among inspirations, adding: "I am obsessed with pop and looking at all the pop girlies that I love, they are the ones doing the absolute most. Like the looks, the choreo, the big songs, big choruses ... that is what I want to deliver."

The concept of the video follows a rags to riches story and features a cameo appearance from Fontaines D.C frontman Grian Chatten. The scene which he appears in was also featured in the band's own music video for "Starburster". In an interview for British Vogue, Jade discussed some of the looks used in the video, which features designs from Skims, Giuseppe Zanotti, Versace, Miu Miu, and Jean Paul Gaultier. In the video she recreated Mariah Carey look from MTV Cribs, and made references to Victoria Beckham, Christina Aguilera, Kylie Minogue, Madonna and Lady Gaga.

== Live performances ==
Jade performed "Angel of My Dreams" for the first time, along with "Fantasy" on Later... with Jools Holland on 19 October 2024. She performed an alternate version of the song at the Rolling Stone UK Awards on 28 November 2024. On 1 March 2025, Thirlwall made her solo BRIT Awards debut performing "Angel Of My Dreams". The performance was divided in five acts: "The Marriage", "Prima Donna", "Metamorphosis", "Requiem" and "Ascension". References to the song's music video and extracts of "It Girl" and "Puppet on a String" were incorporated into the performance.

She performed the song at various festivals, including Glastonbury, Summertime Ball, BBC Radio 1's Big Weekend, Mighty Hoopla and Montreux Jazz Festival. It was also included in her orchestral BBC Proms concert, which was performed along with the Royal Northern Sinfonia.

== Awards and nominations ==
| Year | Award ceremony | Category | Result | Ref. |
|---|---|---|---|---|
| 2024 | Popjustice £20 Music Prize | Best British Pop Single | Nominated | |
| 2024 | UK Music Video Awards | Best Pop Video | Nominated | |
| 2024 | UK Music Video Awards | Best Live Video | Nominated | |
| 2024 | UK Music Video Awards | Best Performance in a Video | Nominated | |
| 2024 | UK Music Video Awards | Best Styling | Nominated | |
| 2024 | UK Music Video Awards | Best Editing in a Video | Won | |
| 2024 | Rolling Stone UK Awards | Song of the Year | Nominated | |
| 2025 | Brit Awards | Song of the Year | Nominated | |
| 2025 | Ivor Novello Awards | Best Contemporary Song | Nominated | |
| 2025 | Popjustice £20 Music Prize | Best British Pop Single | Nominated | |

== Reception ==
"Angel of My Dreams" was met with widespread acclaim from critics. In an exclusive first-listen with Official Charts Company, George Griffiths described the song as "a bold and complex introduction to an artist who is determined to twist and test the boundaries of commercial pop music". They drew comparisons to Jennifer Rush, Rachel Stevens and Harry Styles, stating that the beginning of the track has "heavenly, swooning synths straight out of a 80s power-ballad" while incorporating different genres and electronic elements. They also called it surprising, shocking, and will turn aways from expectations. Nick Reilly from Rolling Stone UK described it as "A bold, unrepentant start to Jade's life as a solo star". They added how "it starts with the most distinctive distorted sample of Sandie Shaw's 'Puppet On A String', before it makes way for a production-heavy, Mariah-esque chorus". Praise was also given towards its lyrical content and sample "noting that the lyrics are spicy, and while the sample seems random, the idea of being a puppet on a string perfectly fits the ethos of the song".

Alistair James from Attitude complimented Thirlwall's vocals, describing "It as Jade demonstrating her angelic and rich vocals. The beat then kicks in and becomes a song we can easily imagine filling the dancefloors this summer". Writing for Clash, Robin Murray gave "Angel of My Dreams" an eight out of ten star rating, describing the song as "a career of success and frustration packed into three minutes, a bold, bravura statement of frenetic creativity, while it's ludicrously colourful, a ridiculously entertaining side-step that utterly wipes the slate clean". Gay Times's Sam Damshenas, praised both the song and music video, saying: "JADE has delivered the most addictive and innovative debut single and video in recent memory". Furthermore, they described it as "A dance-pop anthem, that takes an experimental approach to pop with several distinct sections, from the theatrical balladry of the chorus to the thumping electro verses".

The Tab's Harrison Brocklehurst named it "one of the best pop debuts in recent times". They also added "The way the chorus tempo can sometimes be giving Juice Newton 80s power balladry one minute, and then Y2K Clubland the second time around is just genius work. The whole thing bursts with originality and excitement for what pop music can be when boundaries get pushed". In their review of the song, Billboard contributor Conor Cunningham named "Angel of My Dreams" as one of the best single releases in 2024, describing it as "original and attention grabbing". In the article, they added "'Angel of My Dreams' crackles with well-drawn sonic features, but with the tension between its dreamy bubblegum chorus and steely robo-thump verses representing the warmth of the spotlight and cold behind-the-scenes realities. Regardless of its chart prospects, Jade's solo debut is too bold to go unnoticed and her next move deserves to be hotly anticipated". Women in Pop called the song an "outstanding, bombastic track - in the best possible way - that veers between multiple genres, tempos and pace, abruptly changing paths, taking you completely by surprise," also commenting the song was "a momentous, extremely impressive start to her career...it both continues JADE's impressive music career but also the birth of a new powerful voice in pop."

In their review of the song, Stardust described it as a "powerful solo debut that reflects her evolved sense of artistry and resilience". Praise was given towards the music video for its storytelling and visualisation, adding how it "cleverly incorporates symbolic gestures from her own experiences as she's coerced by greedy corporate men abusing power with a contract signed in blood and a ring symbolizing the binding nature of the entertainment business. Through choreography and visual storytelling, Jade uses these life-changing moments to convey a powerful message about identity and self-discovery".

Critics' year-end rankings
| Publication | List | Rank | Ref. |
|---|---|---|---|
| Exclaim! | 20 Best Songs of 2024 | 18 | |
| The Guardian | The 20 Best Songs of 2024 | 4 | |
| Independent | The 20 Best Songs of 2024 | 7 | |
| NME | The 50 Best Songs of 2024 | 5 | |
| Pitchfork | 100 Best Songs of 2024 | 93 | |
| Time Out | Best Songs of 2024 | 18 | |
| Billboard | Best Songs of 2024 | 50 | |
| Rolling Stone | Best Songs of 2024 | 23 | |
| Stereogum | Best Pop Songs of 2024 | 1 | |
| The New York Times | Best Songs of 2024 | 3 | |
| Stereogum | Best Songs of 2024 | 6 | |
| DIY | Best Songs of 2024 | 1 | |
| Clash | Best Songs of 2024 | 7 | |
| Variety Magazine | Best Songs of 2024 | — | |

== Commercial performance ==
"Angel of My Dreams" reached number two on the UK Singles Sales Chart, UK Singles Downloads Chart, and topped the UK Physical Singles Chart and Official Vinyl Singles Chart. Upon its initial release, it debuted at number seven on the UK Singles Chart, becoming the third highest debut for a single by a British artist in 2024. After the release of the "S.A.D." version, "Angel of My Dreams" returned to the top 10 of the chart at number ten, making her the first Little Mix member to have a solo single spend two weeks inside of the top ten. Following Jade's performance at the 2025 Brit Awards, the song re-entered the UK Singles Chart at number 45 for the week dated 7 March 2025. It was certified platinum by the BPI in October 2026.

In Ireland, "Angel of My Dreams" debuted at number 18 on the Irish Singles Chart, where it spent 12 weeks overall on the chart. Additionally, "Angel of My Dreams" appeared on the New Zealand Hot Singles Chart, the Billboard Global Excl. US chart and on the airplay charts in Estonia and Lithuania. In Brazil, the song earned a platinum certification from Pro-Música Brasil for moving 40,000 units in the country.

In October 2026, the song experienced a resurgence of chart success after being played at the Victoria's Secret Fashion Show 2026 during a runway walk by Kylie Jenner, and Jade performing it at the Mercury Prize ceremony. In the United Kingdom, it re-entered the UK singles chart at number 13 for the week of 30 October 2026, which marks its sixth week in the top twenty and twenty-first week in the top 100. Elsewhere, the song reached number 43 in Norway, number 63 in Sweden, and number 44 in Canada. In the United States, it entered the Billboard Hot 100 at number 70 for the week of 7 November 2026, marking her first entry in the chart as a solo artist. It also peaked at number four on the Billboard Hot Dance/Pop Songs chart the same week.

== Track listings and formats ==
4-inch vinyl – Tiny Vinyl edition

1. "Angel of My Dreams" – 3:17
2. "It Girl" – 2:33

7-inch vinyl, cassette and CD single

1. "Angel of My Dreams" – 3:17
2. "Angel of My Dreams" (S.A.D. version – Slow. Angelic. Dramatic.) – 3:45

Digital download – instrumental

1. "Angel of My Dreams" (instrumental) – 3:07

Streaming/digital download

1. "Angel of My Dreams" – 3:17

Streaming/digital download – For the Club

1. "Angel of My Dreams" (For the club) – 2:54

Streaming/digital download – Jax Jones Y2J remix

1. "Angel of My Dreams" (Jax Jones Y2J remix) – 2:33
2. "Angel of My Dreams" (Jax Jones Y2J remix – extended) – 3:58

Streaming/digital download – S.A.D. version – Slow. Angelic. Dramatic.

1. "Angel of My Dreams" (S.A.D. version – Slow. Angelic. Dramatic.) – 3:45

Streaming/digital download – S.A.D. – Slow. Angelic. Dramatic. – live version

1. "Angel of My Dreams" (S.A.D. – Slow. Angelic. Dramatic. – live version) – 4:10

Streaming/digital download – Scooter remix

1. "Angel of My Dreams" (Scooter remix) – 3:23
2. "Angel of My Dreams" – 3:17

Streaming/digital download – SMU MTG remix

1. "Angel of My Dreams" (SMU MTG remix) – 3:05

Streaming/digital download – The Blessed Madonna remix

1. "Angel of My Dreams" (The Blessed Madonna remix) – 3:53

Streaming/digital download – the Dreamixes

1. "Angel of My Dreams" (For the club) – 2:54
2. "Angel of My Dreams" (The Blessed Madonna remix) – 3:53
3. "Angel of My Dreams" (Jax Jones Y2J remix) – 2:33
4. "Angel of My Dreams" (Scooter remix) – 3:23
5. "Angel of My Dreams" (La La remix) – 2:38
6. "Angel of My Dreams" – 3:17

Streaming/digital download – EP

1. "Angel of My Dreams" – 3:17
2. "Angel of My Dreams" (S.A.D. version – Slow. Angelic. Dramatic.) – 3:45
3. "Angel of My Dreams" (Slowed down) – 3:47
4. "Angel of My Dreams" (Sped Up) – 2:47
5. "Angel of My Dreams" (instrumental) – 3:02

== Charts ==
Chart performance
| Chart (2024–2026) | Peak position |
|---|---|
| Canada Hot 100 (Billboard) | 44 |
| Estonia Airplay (TopHit) | 80 |
| Global 200 (Billboard) | 55 |
| Greece International (IFPI) | 88 |
| Iceland (Billboard) | 20 |
| Ireland (IRMA) | 18 |
| Lithuania (AGATA) | 38 |
| Lithuania Airplay (TopHit) | 74 |
| Netherlands (Single Tip) | 25 |
| New Zealand Hot Singles (RMNZ) | 4 |
| New Zealand Airplay (RCS) | 26 |
| Norway (VG-lista) | 43 |
| Panama Streaming (PRODUCE) | 153 |
| Philippines Hot 100 (Billboard Philippines) | 43 |
| Portugal (AFP) | 77 |
| Sweden (Sverigetopplistan) | 63 |
| UK Singles (Official Charts) | 7 |
| US Billboard Hot 100 | 70 |
| US Hot Dance/Pop Songs (Billboard) | 4 |

== Certifications ==
Certifications and sales
| Region | Certification | Certified units/sales |
|---|---|---|
| Brazil (Pro-Música Brasil) | Platinum | 40,000^{‡} |
| United Kingdom (BPI) | Platinum | 600,000^{‡} |
^{‡} Sales+streaming figures based on certification alone.

== Release history ==
Release formats and dates
| Region | Date | Formats | Versions | Label | Ref. |
|---|---|---|---|---|---|
| Various | 19 July 2024 | Digital download; streaming | Original | RCA | |
| Various | 23 July 2024 | Digital download | Instrumental | RCA | |
| Various | 26 July 2024 | Digital download; streaming | For the Club | RCA | |
| Various | 2 August 2024 | Digital download; streaming | The Blessed Madonna remix | RCA | |
| Various | 9 August 2024 | Digital download; streaming | S.A.D. version – Slow. Angelic. Dramatic. | RCA | |
| Various | 16 August 2024 | Digital download; streaming | S.A.D. – Slow. Angelic. Dramatic. – live version | RCA | |
| Various | 17 August 2024 | Digital download; streaming | SMU MTG remix | RCA | |
| Various | 23 August 2024 | Digital download; streaming | Jax Jones Y2J remix | RCA | |
| Various | 30 August 2024 | Digital download; streaming | Scooter remix | RCA | |
| Various | 6 September 2024 | Digital download; streaming | The Dreamixes | RCA | |
| United Kingdom | 13 September 2024 | 7-inch vinyl; cassette; CD | Original; S.A.D. version – Slow. Angelic. Dramatic. | RCA | |
| Various | 18 October 2024 | LP | The Dreamixes | RCA | |
| United States | 17 July 2026 | 4-inch vinyl | Tiny Vinyl edition | RCA | |
| Various | 21 October 2026 | Digital download; streaming | EP | RCA | |
