= Fantasy (Jade Thirlwall song) =

Single by Jade

from the album That's Showbiz Baby!
- B-side: "Midnight Cowboy"
- Released: 18 October 2024
- Genre: Funk; disco
- Length: 3:36
- Label: RCA
- Composers: Jade Thirlwall; Mike Sabath; Pablo Bowman
- Lyricists: Thirlwall; Bowman
- Producer: Sabath

Jade singles chronology
"Angel of My Dreams" (2024)	"Fantasy" (2024)	"FUFN (Fuck You for Now)" (2025)

Music video
- "Fantasy" on YouTube

"Fantasy" is a song recorded by English singer and songwriter Jade for her debut solo studio album, That's Showbiz Baby! (2025). It was released through RCA Records on 18 October 2024, as the second single from the album. Jade worked with Mike Sabath and Pablo Bowman on the song, whom she worked with on her debut single "Angel of My Dreams". Described as a funk and disco song by publications, the lyrics touch on the subjects of sexuality, sex-positivity and sexual fantasies.

The music video was directed by David LaChapelle and premiered the same day as the single release. It features Jade embodying American musician Diana Ross during the disco era in the 1970s, with references made to the 1976 film Carrie. A new feature with the American rapper Channel Tres was released on 1 November 2024.

== Background and release ==
After releasing her first promotional single "Midnight Cowboy", Jade announced on her social media pages the title, release date and cover artwork for "Fantasy". Megan Armstrong of Uproxx predicted that the singer would continue her "impressive stretch" with the song. In an interview with The Face, Jade described it as "a disco track" with vocal influences of Donna Summer. Dubbed a "love song but more kinky", it lyrics are focused around sexual fantasies and feeling safe enough with someone to tell them what you want to do. The music video was filmed in Los Angeles and directed by David LaChapelle.

== Composition and lyrics ==
"Fantasy" was co-written and composed by Jade Thirlwall, Mike Sabath and Pablo Bowman while production was handled by Sabath, a day after "Angel of My Dreams" was penned in Los Angeles. Musically, it has been described as a funk and disco song lyrically centred around subject matters including femininity, sexuality, sex-positivity, sexual desires, and sexual fantasies.

== Reception ==
Upon release the song received positive reviews. In an exclusive first-listen with Official Charts Company, George Griffiths described Fantasy "as JADE pushing pop boundaries". They drew musical comparisons to American acts including Chic, Nile Rodgers, Mariah Carey and to English singer Raye concluding that it had influences of 70's funk, and 80's post-disco. For Dork, Abigail Firth wrote that "'Fantasy' was making Jade one of the most exciting acts in British pop". In their review they added how "Fantasy" resembles Jessie Ware's album What's Your Pleasure? (2020), and incorporates disco sounds from Dua Lipa's second studio album, Future Nostalgia (2020). Influences were also compared to Diana Ross, Kylie Minogue, Tove Lo, and SG Lewis.

Writing for Clash, Shahzaib Hussain wrote "'Fantasy' is an irresistible assemblage of post-gay disco liberation, processed by ASMR purrs and ecstatic vocal ululations, all melting into a euphoric club-ready mix that speaks to the judgement free zone Jade is rendering".

== Promotion and live performances ==
On 19 October 2024, Thirlwall performed "Fantasy", alongside her debut single "Angel of My Dreams" on Later... with Jools Holland. On 25 October, Thirlwall performed the song and a cover of "Backbone" by Chase & Status and Stormzy on BBC Radio 1's Live Lounge. On 31 December, Thirlwall performed the single and a medley cover of "Hot Stuff" by Donna Summer and "Knock on Wood" by Eddie Floyd on Jools' Annual Hootenanny.

== Track listings and formats ==
7-inch vinyl, cassette and CD single

1. "Fantasy" – 3:36
2. "Midnight Cowboy" – 3:32

Streaming/digital download

1. "Fantasy" – 3:36

Streaming/digital download – Alex Chapman remix

1. "Fantasy" (Alex Chapman remix) – 2:54

Streaming/digital download – BBC Radio 1 Live Lounge

1. "Fantasy" (BBC Radio 1 Live Lounge) – 3:13
2. "Backbone" (BBC Radio 1 Live Lounge) – 2:37

Streaming/digital download – featuring Channel Tres

1. "Fantasy" (featuring Channel Tres) – 3:36

== Charts ==
Chart performance
Chart (2024)	Peak position
Lithuania Airplay (TopHit)	89
Lithuania Airplay (TopHit) (Version with Channel Tres)	95
UK Singles (Official Charts)	52

== Release history ==
Release formats and dates
Region	Date	Version	Format	Label	Ref.
Various	18 October 2024	Original	Cassette; CD; digital download; streaming	RCA	
Various	25 October 2024	Original	7-inch vinyl	RCA	
Various	1 November 2024	featuring Channel Tres	Digital download; streaming	RCA	
Various	29 November 2024	Alex Chapman remix	Digital download; streaming	RCA	
Various	20 December 2024	BBC Radio 1 Live Lounge	Digital download; streaming	RCA	
