= Mighty Hoopla =

Annual outdoor music festival in England

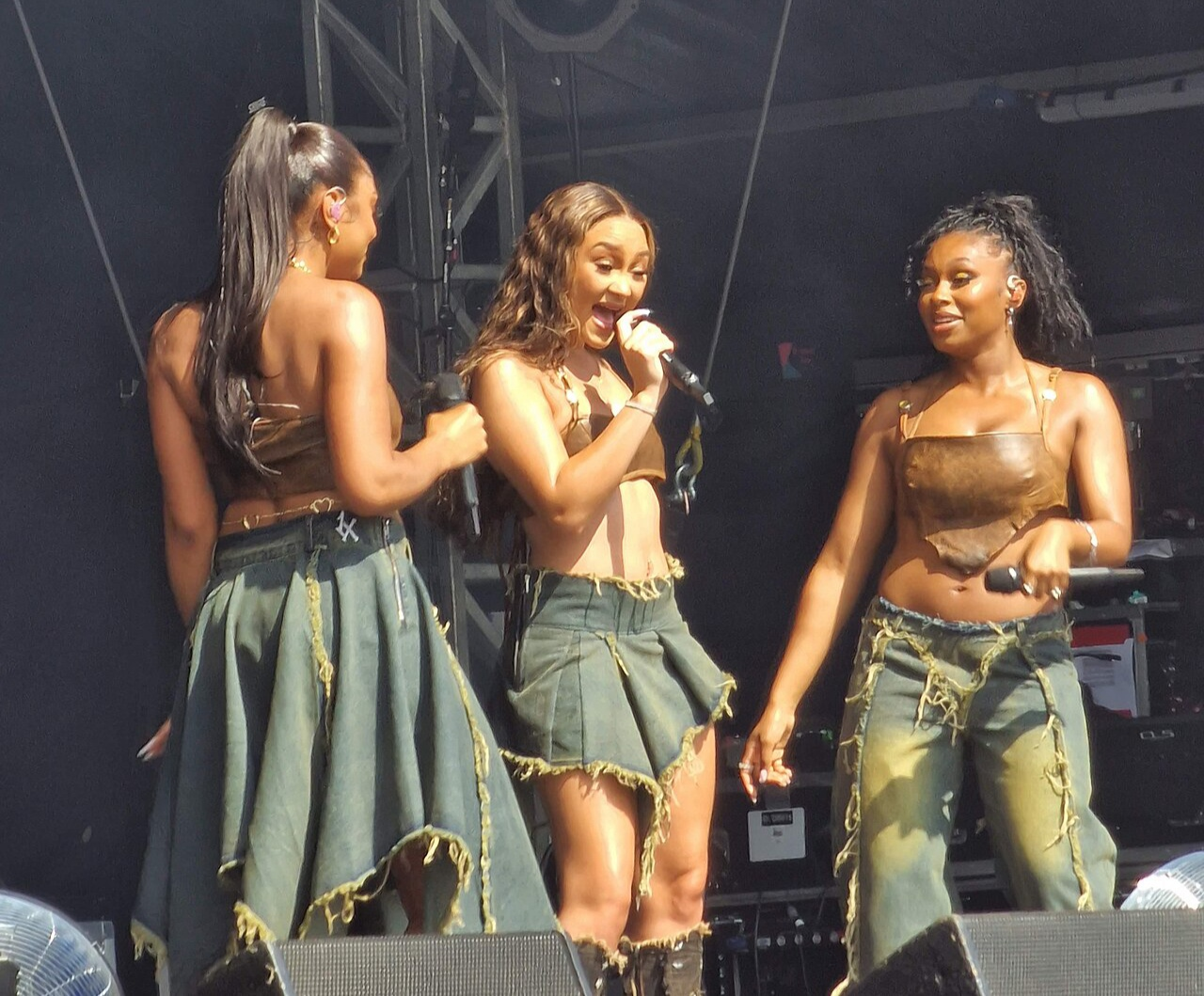
- Flo at Mighty Hoopla in 2023, which took place in Brockwell Park
- Locations: Butlins in Bognor Regis (2016), Victoria Park, Tower Hamlets (2017), Brockwell Park (2018 - present)
- Years active: 2016 – present
- Capacity: 25,000

Mighty Hoopla is a yearly outdoor music festival in London, and Europe's largest LGBTQ+ music festival. It is known for including performances and DJ sets by drag performers in its programming.

== History ==
It was founded by Johnno Burgess, Glynn Fussell and Jamie Tagg, organisers of clubnight Sink the Pink, DJ and radio presenter Sean Rowley, and Ally Wolf. The first event was held in 2016 at Butlins in Bognor Regis on the south coast, before moving to Victoria Park, Tower Hamlets in 2017, and then Brockwell Park in South London from 2018. In 2023 Superstruct Entertainment bought a majority stake in the festival.

The Butlins version of the festival was revived as The Mighty Hoopla Big Weekender from 2022 until 2024. In 2025 the Big Weekender moved to the Mediterranean island of Malta, with venues in multiple locations including Cafe Del Mar in Saint Paul's Bay, Little Armier Beach in Mellieħa, and Gianpula Village on the outskirts of Rabat.

The festival is known for including performances and DJ sets by drag performers. At the 2024 edition this included Jodie Harsh, David Hoyle, Tia Kofi, and Ginny Lemon.

In October 2024, the festival's majority owner Superstruct Entertainment was bought by private-equity and investment company KKR. In May 2025, amidst backlash against it and other Superstruct-owned music companies such as Field Day and Boiler Room, Mighty Hoopla issued a statement saying that it stands in opposition of the "unethical investments" of KKR.

In 2025, local residents successfully brought a judicial review challenging the permission given by Lambeth London Borough Council to use Brockwell Park for Mighty Hoopla and a number of other music events, on the basis that the council had blocked use of the park for too long.

During her set at the 2025 edition of the festival, former Little Mix member Jade Thirlwall made headlines by leading the audience in an "anti-J.K. Rowling" chant in reference to the writer having made and shared what The Independent called: "numerous posts containing hateful rhetoric toward the trans and non-binary communities".

On February 21, 2026, the first Australian edition of the festival took place in Sydney at Bondi Beach. American singer Kesha headlined.

== Lineups ==
=== England ===
Date	Location	Artists
26-29 February 2016	Butlins, Bognor Regis	En Vogue, Hercules & Love Affair, Sister Sledge, Corona, Rozalla, Baby D
4 June 2017	Victoria Park, London	All Saints, Snap!, Charlotte Church's Late Night Pop Dungeon, Alma, Sophie Ellis-Bextor, Will Young, Years & Years, Artful Dodger, Fleur East, S Club 3, Raye, Girli
3 June 2018	Brockwell Park, London	TLC, Lily Allen, Melanie C, Louise, Vengaboys, B*Witched, MNEK, Nimmo Louisa Johnson, Belinda Carlisle
8 June 2019	Brockwell Park, London	Chaka Khan, Kate Nash, All Saints, Bananarama, Liberty X, Samantha Mumba, Jamelia, Tove Lo, Confidence Man, Crystal Waters, Ultra Naté, Livin Joy, Artful Dodger
4 September 2021	Brockwell Park, London	Atomic Kitten, Cheryl, Kathy Sledge, Gabrielle, Alexandra Burke, Raye, Becky Hill, Honeyz, Lava La Rue En Vogue, Eve, C&C Music Factory, Whigfield
3-4 June 2022	Brockwell Park, London	Blue, Natalie Imbruglia, Anastacia, Steps, Sugababes, Kim Wilde, Cascada, Jayda G, Basement Jaxx, Self Esteem, Jessie Ware, Kate Nash, Macy Gray, The 411, Katy B
3-4 June 2023	Brockwell Park, London	Kelly Rowland, Years & Years, Confidence Man, Kelis, Natasha Bedingfield, Beverley Knight, Sophie Ellis-Bextor, Soul II Soul, Vengaboys, Shola Ama, Jamelia, Jayde Adams, Artful Dodger, Snap!, Flo, Aqua, Jake Shears, Michelle McManus, Loreen, Clea, Nadine Coyle, Lisa Scott-Lee, Liberty X, Nicola Roberts & Kimberley Walsh (Guest appearance with Years & Years)
1-2 June 2024	Brockwell Park, London	Nelly Furtado, Jessie Ware, En Vogue, Rita Ora, Bananarama, JoJo Siwa, Claire Richards, B*witched, Hercules & Love Affair, Artful Dodger, Alison Goldfrapp, Rachel Stevens, The Veronicas, Delta Goodrem, Louise, Shaznay Lewis, Cher Lloyd, Eve, Rebecca Black, Bambie Thug, Nakhane
31 May-1 June 2025	Brockwell Park, London	Saturday - Ciara, Jade, Jojo, Craig David (special guest with Jojo), Jamelia, Daniel Bedingfield, G Flip, Amy Studt, Jude York ,Booty Luv, Jimbo, Mutya Buena, Artful Dodger, Daphne and Celeste Sunday - Kesha, Loreen, Erika Jayne, Kate Nash with the Royal Philharmonic Concert Orchestra, Heidi Montag, Lemar, Lulu, Vengaboys, Tayce, Pixie Lott

=== International ===
Date	Location	Artists
26–29 September 2025	Multiple locations in Malta	Melanie C, Leigh-Anne, Rose Gray, Katy B, Ultra Naté, Miriana Conte, Trixie Mattel, Bimini, Fat Tony, Kiddy Smile, Jodie Harsh, Jack Rooke
21 February 2026	Bondi Beach, Australia	Kesha, Becky Hill, Countess Luann, Delta Goodrem, Jessica Mauboy, Rose Gray, Bardot, Absolute, Armana Khan, Atomic Kiss, Aunty Tamara, Big Wett, Bimini Bon-Boulash, The Blak Queen curated by Miss Ellaneous, Charlie Villas, Diva Cups, Dizzy Bility, Dyan Tai, Eli Crawford, Fried Pork Chop, Hashbraownn, Heaps Gay, Heath Keating, James Vidigal, Mowgli May, Rocky Stallone featuring House of Silky, Jamaica Moana, Jubahlee, Royston Noell, Sexy Galexy, Tom Aspaul, Yvngcweed
