= Substitute Teacher (Key & Peele) =

Segment of the sketch comedy TV series

- Key & Peele segment
- Mr. Garvey scolds Aaron
- Episode no.: Season 2 Episode 4 (segment)
- Directed by: Peter Atencio
- Written by: Rebecca Drysdale; Colton Dunn; Keegan-Michael Key; Phil Augusta Jackson; Jay Martel; Jordan Peele; Ian Roberts; Alex Rubens; Charlie Sanders
- Original air date: October 17, 2012
- Running time: 3 minutes

Episode chronology
← Previous "Puppy Dog Ice-T"	Next → "Bone Thugs-n-Homeless"

"Substitute Teacher" is a segment of the sketch comedy television series Key & Peele. It first aired on Comedy Central on October 17, 2012, as part of "I'm Retired", the fourth episode of the series's second season. "Substitute Teacher" was directed by Peter Atencio and written by multiple writers, including the eponymous Keegan-Michael Key and Jordan Peele. In the segment, Mr. Garvey (Key) is the substitute teacher of a biology class. While taking roll, Garvey begins stating the names of students in the class and pronounces their names incorrectly. As each student corrects him, Garvey becomes progressively angrier.

Upon being uploaded to YouTube, "Substitute Teacher" became a viral video; as of April 2026, the video has over 230 million views. The sketch spurred a sequel, "Substitute Teacher Pt. 2", as part of the first episode of the third season. In 2015, Deadline Hollywood reported that Paramount Pictures had purchased a pitch for a feature version of the sketch. Key reprised his role as Mr. Garvey in a November 2022 advertisement for Paramount+. Since its debut, "Substitute Teacher" has received positive reception and has been analyzed for its racial commentary and educational insight.

== Plot ==
External video
- Substitute Teacher - Key & Peele on YouTube

Mr. Garvey is a pugnacious and volatile former inner city teacher of twenty years and substitute teacher assigned to a predominantly white biology class. Garvey states each of the names on his attendance sheet, pronouncing each name incorrectly, including Jacqueline—pronounced as "Jay Quellin", Blake—pronounced as "Balakay", Denise—pronounced as "Dee-nice", and Aaron—pronounced as "A. A. Ron". Each student corrects Garvey, who refuses to accept that their names are legitimately pronounced in the way that they pronounce it; Garvey proclaims that he has his eye on Jacqueline, asks if Blake "want[s] to go to war", and breaks his clipboard while insisting that Denise say her name correctly. When Aaron corrects Garvey, he angrily sweeps everything off his table and chastises Aaron, before sending him to Principal O'Shaughnessy's office, whose name he mispronounces as "O'Shag-Hennessy". After Aaron leaves, Garvey continues the list with Timothy—pronounced as "Tim O. Thee", the only black student in the class, who does not correct him, answering with PRE-sent, also mispronouncing the same way as Garvey.

== Production ==
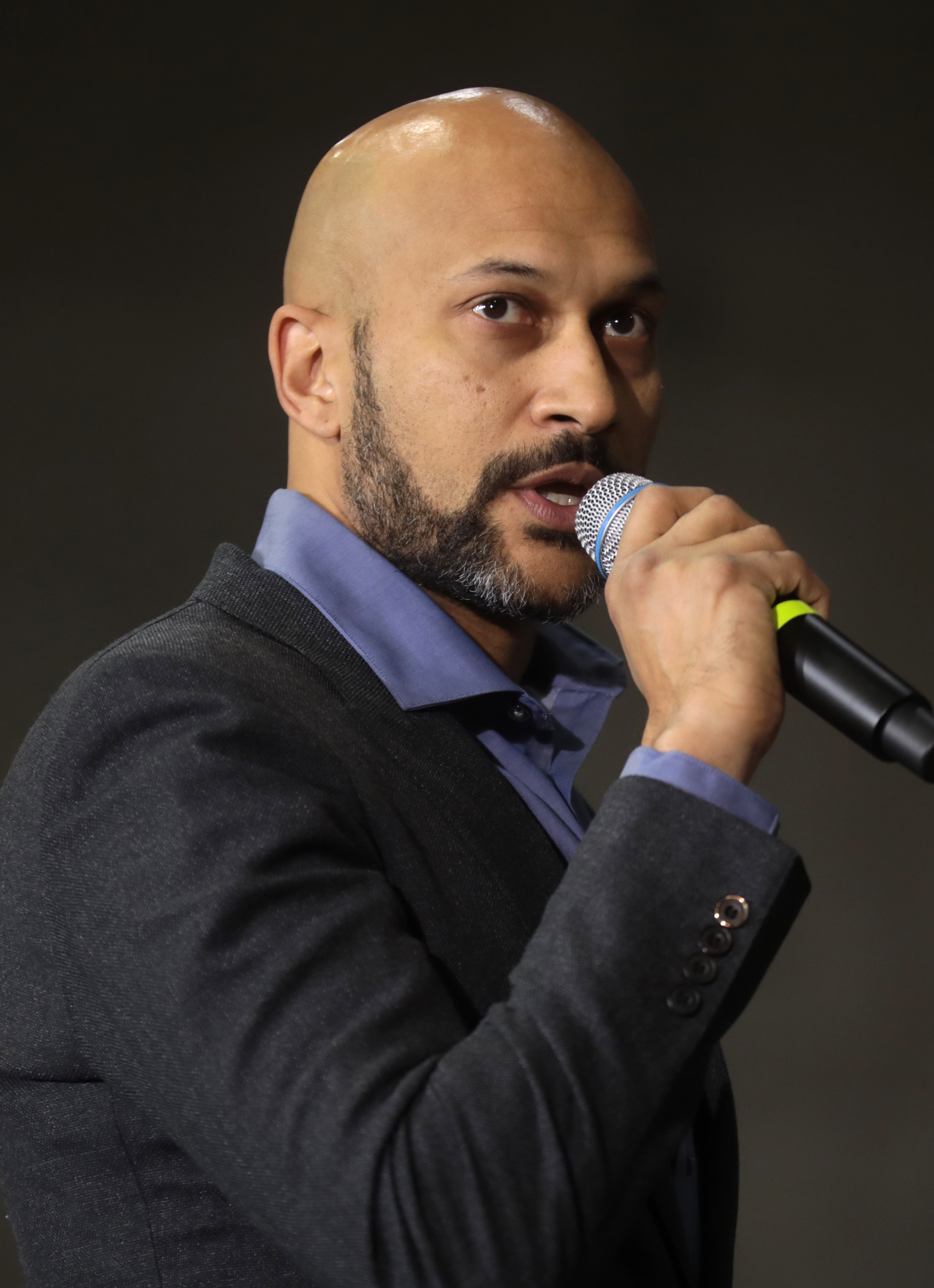
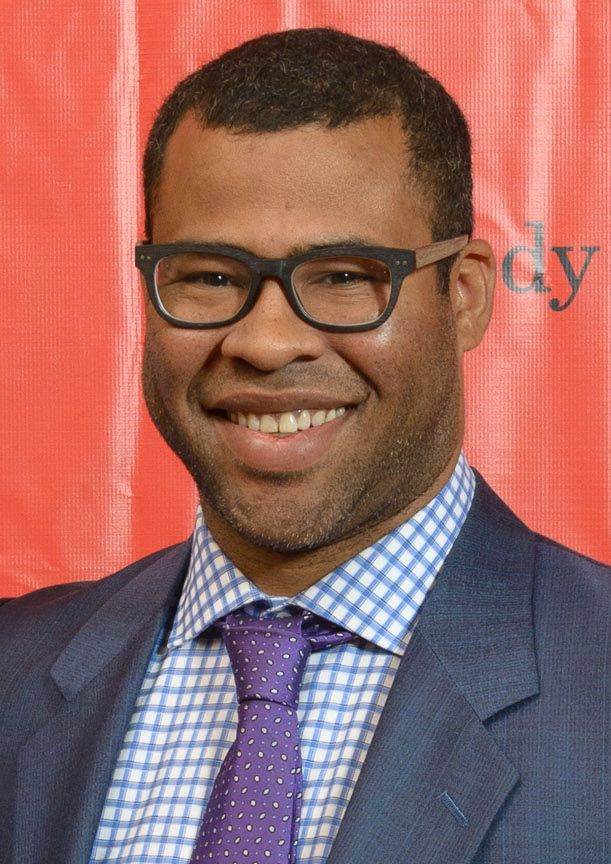
Keegan-Michael Key (left) and Jordan Peele (right) co-wrote "Substitute Teacher" and appear as Mr. Garvey and Timothy, respectively.

"Substitute Teacher" was directed by Peter Atencio. In an interview with Entertainment Weekly, Keegan-Michael Key described the writers' room as "sharks in a frenzy after some chum had been dumped in the water" after the premise was announced, adding that everyone "had an example of a name that they thought could work". In characterizing Jacqueline, Carlson Young stated that she pictured her as a "studious bookworm" who is snarky but averse to punishment. According to Key, the line "insubordinate and churlish" was improvised; it was later used in "Awesome Hitler Story", a sketch about a Nazi officer recounting his experience meeting Adolf Hitler in the second episode of season four. On his podcast The History of Sketch Comedy, Key compared "Substitute Teacher" to a sketch from The Two Ronnies about mispronouncing names.

To embody Mr. Garvey, Key gave the character age and "haggardness". Several names were suggested, including Jonathan and David. According to Jordan Peele, Aaron and Blake were chosen from his childhood friends, noting that the names were "really white". Key told Fresh Air's Terry Gross that he modeled Mr. Garvey on a vigilant and aggressive guidance counselor he had in his predominantly black Catholic elementary school. Peele appears as Timothy, who states "present" at the end of the sketch, incorrectly emphasizing the "pre". Shelby Fero, who portrayed Denise, recounted that Peele was nearly absent from the sketch and Timothy was intended to be another student whose name was mispronounced. In the sketch, Aaron, played by Zack Pearlman, unnecessarily wears protective goggles due to Pearlman's pink eye.

The original idea of the sketch considered Mr. Garvey teaching a Spanish class from a military perspective, such that the only phrases he could recite were "Help me, I'm kidnapped!" or "How much for that prostitute?"

The actors in "Substitute Teacher" reprised their role in "Substitute Teacher Pt. 2" in the premiere episode of season three. Key and Peele sought to recapture the essence of the first sketch—the dichotomy of the inner city juxtaposed with a suburban school—without repeating the incorrect pronunciation joke.

"Substitute Teacher Pt. 2" ultimately reused the original characters but involved them attempting to explain to an untrusting Garvey that they need to leave class early for their extracurricular club yearbook photographs, which he misinterprets as going out clubbing; Timothy is able to leave early after telling Garvey that he needs to pick up his daughter. An additional student, Jessica—pronounced "Ja-Seeca", is named but does not speak.

== Reception and legacy ==
External video
- Substitute Teacher Pt. 2 - Key & Peele on YouTube

As of April 2026, "Substitute Teacher" has 230 million views on YouTube, making it one of Key & Peele's most recognized sketches, though the duo had not planned to post it online. In particular, the sketch received acclaim from educators, who showed it in their classes. Screen Rant ranked "I'm Retired" as the fourth-best episode of Key & Peele largely due to the sketch, and TV Insider called "Substitute Teacher" one of its favorite sketches. In October 2019, The Washington Post called the sketch one of the most defining of the past 20 years. Vulture ranked the sketch the seventh-best Key & Peele sketch. Key attributed the sketch's success, along with "East/West College Bowl", to the pronunciation and ownership of names; in East/West College Bowl 3, a character named "A. A. Ron Rodgers"—portrayed by Aaron Rodgers—appears. In September 2014, Key and Peele revealed that they were negotiating with Paramount Pictures to develop a movie around "Substitute Teacher". In November 2015, Deadline Hollywood reported that 21 Laps Entertainment would produce the film and that it would be written by Key & Peele executive producers Rich Talarico and Alex Rubens. The plot purportedly involved Mr. Garvey and a rival teacher, played by Peele, who is adored by students. In November 2022, Key reprised his role as Garvey for a Paramount+ advertisement featuring characters from several Paramount-owned properties in the roles as students. In the 2024 movie Transformers One, Key voices B-127, who creates fake bots to keep him company during his life. One of these bots is named A. A. Tron, a reference to the sketch.

== Analysis ==
[The sketch] shows us that the naming and pronunciation norms of the dominant, largely white American culture are not natural or eternal. The sketch's humor in this reading, then, comes from making this assumed, implicitly white norm explicit and, in doing so, it asks Comedy Central's desired white audience to grapple with this possibility.

— Nick Marx, 2019

University of California, Berkeley, student Hecong Qin analyzed "Substitute Teacher" and its sequel for Unlocking Key & Peele, a digital project. Qin noted that the sketch flips cultural stereotypes—that white teachers cannot pronounce names of people of color—to demonstrate cultural relativity to highlight cultural differences. Additionally, he notes the realistic and subdued expressions of the students against Mr. Garvey's dramatic body language and actions. Qin also highlighted the word choice used by Garvey, contrasting his slang with his use of words such as "insubordinate and churlish", "mischievous and deceitful", and "chicanerous and deplorable", the lattermost use of "chicanery" being an attempt to use parallelism to form a definitive negative pattern. In the sequel, he compares the experience of white students, who are stereotyped as taking many extracurricular activities, to black students, who are stereotyped with dealing with teen parenthood at higher rates. Nerdist made a similar pronunciation difficulty comparison, and Code Switch underscored the "duality of black identity" present in Key & Peele as a whole, particularly "Substitute Teacher". The mispronunciation in the sketch was cited as an example of "arrogant mangling" by Anita Bright and Christopher L. Cardiel. Black literature professor Brandon J. Manning postulated that Mr. Garvey's surname could be a reference to Marcus Garvey, a Black nationalist who shared Garvey's fervor.

Educational analysis of "Substitute Teacher" has varied. Pennsylvania State University professor Patricia H. Hinchey and educational foundations professor Pamela J. Konkol wrote that educators' assumptions—often erroneous—of students of an unfamiliar culture can lead to uncomfortable situations. Amy L. Plackowski, a linguistics teacher at Hudson High School in Hudson, Massachusetts, used "Substitute Teacher" to analyze Key and Peele's perceptions of African American Vernacular English, as well as the audience. Social entrepreneur Jill Vialet was more critical of the sketch and its sequel, finding it and the book series Miss Nelson is Missing! by Harry Allard to be representative of the narrative that substitute teachers are cruel and incompetent. University of Florida qualitative research professor Kakali Bhattacharya reevaluated "Substitute Teacher" as a reflection of the culture weaponization against students of color; in such a context, the only relief—according to Bhattacharya—is to flip the script, refuse the oppression, and demonstrate the absurdity in such forms of oppression.
