= Blood and Concrete =

1991 American film

- Directed by: Jeffrey Reiner
- Written by: Richard LaBrie; Jeffrey Reiner
- Produced by: Richard LaBrie
- Starring: Billy Zane; Jennifer Beals
- Cinematography: Declan Quinn
- Edited by: Richard LaBrie; Jeffrey Reiner
- Music by: Vinny Golia
- Distributed by: I.R.S. Media
- Release date: September 13, 1991
- Running time: 114 minutes 95 minutes (PAL)
- Country: United States
- Language: English

Blood & Concrete: A Love Story is a 1991 American romantic crime comedy film directed by Jeffrey Reiner and co-written by Richard LaBrie, starring Billy Zane and Jennifer Beals.

== Plot ==
Set in Los Angeles, the film stars Joey Turks, a car thief who needs money to get out of town.

It opens with Joey stealing a television set from the home of drug dealer Mort, who owes him cash, but is caught red-handed. After Joey drops the TV and breaks it, Mort angrily stabs him with a knife and chases him away. While bleeding, Joey reaches a cemetery where he meets Mona, an unsuccessful singer who is on the verge of committing suicide over her past relationships. Joey trips by her and asks her for help. Mona takes him to her apartment and treats him, then asks him to stay.

Later, Joey is surprised by Detective Hank Dick, who sarcastically warns him that he could go to jail. He is taken to Mort's house, who has been shot and now lies dead in the swimming pool. As Joey's fingerprints have been found everywhere, he is the main suspect. Under threat from Hank, Joey tells him that all he did was deliver a package from a man called Spuntz. Upon hearing the name, Hank realises that Joey is innocent and explains that he has been looking for Spuntz for twenty years. Conscious that Joey is Spuntz's next target, Hank asks him to help him find Spuntz.

That night, while Joey is conversing with a young man outside a club, he is surprised by Bart Daniels, who suddenly grabs him and pulls him into a car to take him once again to Mort's house. There he meets Spuntz, who asks him the whereabouts of the package. Joey claims he does not know and Spuntz explains to him that what he delivered contained a hallucinogenic drug called Libido, which increases people's sexual drive and is highly addictive, allowing him to make large economic gains. Joey continues to insist that he does not know where the drug is and Bart begins to play Russian roulette on him. After several lucky shots, Joey gives in and offers to take Bart to "the location". However, while they are in the car, Joey quickly grabs Bart's gun and flees. Then Joey finds Mona and gets her into a stolen car, telling her they have to leave town, but after Mona says he would have to leave on his own, they go back home.

The next day, Joey is at a restaurant, where he learns from a contact that Spuntz has a million dollars invested in the missing package. He then visits Sammy Rhodes to ask for help in finding the package, but Sammy refuses and suggests he leave the situation he is in. Mona telephones Joey and asks him to come home. But just then, Joey is surprised by Detective Hank, who takes him back to the restaurant, where the contact is now seen dead, with a bullet shot in his forehead. Hank threatens Joey and accuses him of meeting Spuntz, but Joey insists that he not that type of criminal and explains that the drug dealer kills anyone in possession of the drugs to maintain his monopoly. As Joey is walking home, Bart surprises him with a gun and forces him to join Spuntz and him for dinner. Spuntz warns Joey that he has been betrayed and leaves, leaving him alone with Bart. Joey tells Bart that they are going to be Hank and Spuntz's next victims, and that they should work together, but a drugged Bart threatens him to have sex with him.

After escaping, Joey arrives at Mona's flat, where he notices a pill in the floor, which he finds was given to her by Lance, her ex-boyfriend. Joey threatens him and he confesses that he got it from Mort a long time ago. Outside, Joey is yet again surprised by Bart, who chases him in his car, but with the help of the young man he was chatting to a few days earlier, he escapes. He takes Joey to the restaurant, tells him that they cannot be found there and motivates him, but Bart suddenly arrives and shoots the young man in the forehead, while Joey flees.

Puzzled, Joey sits by Mort's body, unable to solve the situation. He then discovers that all the bags containing the drugs had been swallowed by the pool's filter pump. He packs them into a suitcase and goes home, telling Mona that they must leave, despite her disapproval. Right after, they receive a sudden visit from Spuntz and Bart, who threaten to kill them if they do not hand over the drugs, but Hank immediately finds them and arrests them. Joey then flees to the cemetery, but the criminals quickly steal Hank's gun and follow after him. Joey meets Sammy in the cemetery, who he planned to give the suitcase in exchange for a large sum of money, but Sammy instead pulls a gun on him, asking Joey to forgive him. As Joey is about to be shot, Bart shows up from behind, shoots Sammy and follows to chase Joey into the cemetery. Cornered by Bart, Joey uses the last bullet from his gun, killing him.

Meanwhile, Lance goes to Mort's house and finds the last bags of the drug, when he is abruptly shot by Spuntz, who is in turn shot by Hank. The detective tells them that they had been scammed and it was all nothing but caffeine, sedative and laxative all along, as they both fall into the bloody pool. The final scene shows Joey grabbing Sammy's suitcase with the money and dropping the one with the worthless bags, as he leaves the city along with Mona.

== Cast ==
Name	Actor
Joey Turks	Billy Zane
Mona	Jennifer Beals
Hank Dick	Darren McGavin
Spuntz	Nicholas Worth
Bart Daniels	Mark Pellegrino
Sammy Rhodes	Harry Shearer
Lance	James LeGros
Mort	William Bastiani

== Reception ==
Michael Wilmington of the Los Angeles Times gave the film a mixed review and wrote: "This movie’s zaniness, energy and wild, weird characters are its vein of gold. But, in a way, Blood isn’t all that unique, just denser and more compact. Many mainstream thrillers share the same cynicism about L.A., the same fondness for old movie motifs.

Nick Hartel of DVD Talk gave the film a positive review, calling it "a consistently entertaining film".

TV Guide also gave the film a positive review, describing it as "a stylish, well-paced romp".

== Influence and legacy ==
An illegal Russian voice-over version (voiced by Andrey Gavrilov) of the scene at the beginning of the film where Mort insults Joey Turks for thirty seconds has become a popular meme on the Russian internet.
