= Shelby Fero =

American writer and comedian

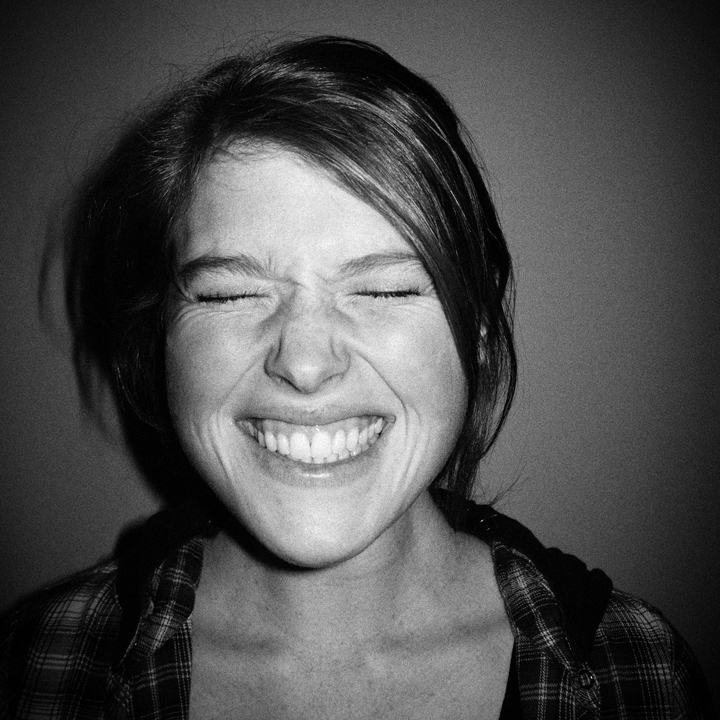
- Fero in 2012
- Born: Shelby Ann Fero; October 27, 1993 (age 32); Santa Clara, California, United States
- Education: USC School of Cinematic Arts; Menlo-Atherton High School
- Notable work: Other Space; Money from Strangers @midnight Chozen; Robot Chicken

Comedy career
- Years active: 2010–present
- Medium: Stand up, television, video, Twitter
- Genre: Observational comedy
- Subjects: gender dynamics, female stereotypes, everyday life

Shelby Ann Fero (born October 27, 1993) is an American writer and comedian.

== Early life ==
Fero was born at Stanford Hospital on October 27, 1993. After graduating from Menlo-Atherton High School, she attended the USC School of Cinematic Arts before leaving to pursue a career in comedy.

== Career ==
Shelby Fero is an American comedian best known for her popular tweets. She has written for Cracked and HelloGiggles. Fero has done stand-up at Magic Bag (Eliza Skinner's and DC Pierson's stand-up showcase in Los Angeles). She appeared on a live version of WTF with Marc Maron, and have been a panelist several times on National Public Radio's Wait Wait... Don't Tell Me show. She played Denise (mispronounced as Dee-nice) in Key & Peele's viral "Substitute Teacher" sketch. In 2016, she won an Emmy Award for Outstanding Short Form Animated Program.

As of 2025 Fero is working primarily as an all-occasion photographer in the Bay Area.

== Filmography ==
=== Film ===
- 2013 Froyo Robbery (Short)
- 2014 DeAndre Jordan's Amazing Charles Barkley Impression (Short)
- 2014 The Live Read of Space Jam with Blake Griffin (Short)

=== Television ===
- Other Space
- Money from Strangers
- @midnight
- Chozen
- Robot Chicken
- Brad Neely's Harg Nallin Sclopio Peepio
- Disney's 3x5 Live
- Idiotest Season 3, episode 18 (2016)
- Loiter Squad Season 3
- Key & Peele

== See also ==
- List of Wait Wait... Don't Tell Me! episodes (2016)
- List of Wait Wait... Don't Tell Me! episodes (2014)
- Hey Girl (TV series)
- List of WTF with Marc Maron episodes
