= Mack & Moxy =

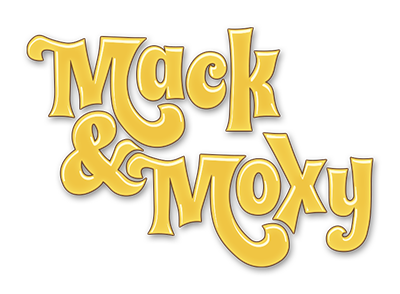
- Genre: Animation; Puppetry
- Created by: Brahm Wenger
- Voices of: Brian Drummond; Kathleen Barr
- Country of origin: United States
- Original language: English
- No. of seasons: 1
- No. of episodes: 12

Production
- Executive producers: Brahm Wenger; Kellee McQuinn
- Running time: 14 minutes
- Production companies: Socially Dynamic Entertainment; Georgia Public Broadcasting

Original release
- Network: PBS member stations/APT (U.S.); Family Jr. (Canada)
- Release: February 5 – April 22, 2016

Mack & Moxy is an American live-action/animated children's television series. Each episode teaches children lessons of charity and compassion, while celebrating the joy of altruistically helping others. Created by Brahm Wenger and Alan Green, the show combines 3D animation, live-action costumes, and original songs and music. The show was distributed by American Public Television and aired on select PBS stations from February 5, 2016, to April 22, 2016, and reran until February 16, 2020. The complete first season began streaming on Netflix in October 2016.

== Overview ==
Each episode includes two 14-minute segments and follows Mack, a lovable, mooselike lummox, and Moxy, a feisty, raccoon/fox-inspired go-getter as they take off on another adventure. Together with a helpful Trooper (child), they set out to rescue another Great Helpee in a far-off mystical place called HelpeeLand.

Along the way, Mack & Moxy meet a new Friend-In-Need who introduces Mack & Moxy (and the kids at home) to a new important cause.

A number of non-profits and government organizations partnered with Mack & Moxy for the show's first season. These included: American Heart Association, American Red Cross, Citizen Schools, Easter Seals, Feeding America, Safe Kids Worldwide, National Park Foundation, Orange County Sheriff's Department, Playworks, President's Council on Fitness, Sports & Nutrition, Save the Children and World Wildlife Fund.

Mack & Moxy's major underwriters for season one included: SanDisk, ConAgra Foods, Edison International, Pacific Gas & Electric Company, QVC, Mendability, the Robert Wood Johnson Foundation, and Graco Children's Products. Additional funding was provided by San Diego Gas & Electric, the Bernard P. Novak Foundation, IKEA, Elizabeth Pang Fullerton, the Deeann and Al Baldwin Foundation, and True Drinks.

== Production ==
Mack & Moxy was created by executive producer Brahm Wenger, who has worked for Walt Disney Pictures as well as produced and wrote scores and songs for over 40 children's films – including the complete Air Bud and Air Buddies series. The show was co-produced by Bardel Entertainment.

== Characters ==
- Mack – A mooselike gentle giant – the enthusiastic, fun-loving instant best pal of everyone he meets. He's always ready to lead, follow or dance, depending on the situation. Voiced by Brian Drummond, who has a unique ability called "Instant Moosaging", which allows for instant audio and visual communication to Helpee HQ (specifically to the Admirable of the episode) and Clixx (a character explained below), via his antlers.
- Moxy – A power-packed pink raccoon who's filled with endless energy and eternal optimism. Voiced by Kathleen Barr.
- The Troopers – Each episode features a guest Trooper, children are selected with, and for, the non-profit and their cause. The Troopers helped Mack & Moxy on their adventure to rescue the Great Helpee, while sharing knowledge about the cause.
- Friend-in-Need – In each episode, Mack & Moxy meet a Friend-in-Need on one of their many adventures to save another Great Helpee. The Friend-in-Need introduces Mack & Moxy (and the audience at home) to a new and important cause. They can either be people who require assistance from the Helpee Heroes, such as Ty the Grrr, or people who help the heroes, without needing assistance themselves, such as Sheriff Hiya.
- The Admirable – The leader of the Great Helpee Heroes who sends Mack & Moxy on their mission to save another Great Helpee. Sometimes played by a guest celebrity. Season 1 guest stars include: Kal Penn, Keegan-Michael Key, Dean Norris, Eva LaRue, Matt Lucas, Melissa Fumero, Josh Duhamel, and Rachael Ray. Female admirables (like Kellee McQuinn) wear golden bowtie necklaces around their necks and ornament headbands on their heads while male admirables wear golden neckties around their necks and goggles on their foreheads.
- Clixx – A classic, scatter-brained brainiac robot. Clixx's job is to provide technical help and guidance via Instant Moosaging to Mack & Moxy on their adventure to save the Great Helpee. Voiced by James Murray.
- The Great Helpee – Magical creatures whose powers bring happiness and helpfulness to the world. In each episode, a new Great Helpee is about to hatch in HelpeeLand and the show's Heroes are on a mission to find it first.
- Shellfish Sheldon – A devil lobster with big problems, though not quite devilish in the traditional sense. He's a selfish, claw-rubbing schemer who is obsessed with keeping all the Great Helpees for himself. Voiced by Hank Azaria. His catchphrase, which he utters everytime his schemes fail (which is in every episode) is "Next time, Shellfish Sheldon Shall Succeed!". He also has a lisp, which adds to the alliteration of his catchphrase.

== Episodes ==
No.	Title	Admirable:	Original release date
1	"A Friend Who Reads Is a Friend Indeed"	Josh Duhamel	February 5, 2016
Mack & Moxy set out with Trooper Kaitlyn on a colorful adventure to HelpeeLand in search of a Great Helpee. They meet Nolie, a lovable little puffball who has never had any pals to play with. As the Heroes become her first friends, they share and sing about the joys of reading books. Meanwhile, Shelfish Sheldon lurks nearby, scheming and sledding to the Great Helpee so he can keep all its happiness for himself. The episode supports Save the Children, which has provided quality preschool programs to underserved children around the world since 1932.
2	"Always Be Prepared"	Kal Penn	February 12, 2016
When Mack & Moxy zoom off to HelpeeLand with Trooper Jax to save another Great Helpee, they meet a cool kid named Kendling Pop-Pop Jr. He's busy drafting an escape plan for his house in case there's a fire. As they're looking for the Great Helpee in the house, the Kendling's smoke detector beeps. Remembering how to stay safe, they “get low and go.” Meanwhile, Shelfish Sheldon scurries about to get the Great Helpee first so he can keep all its happiness for himself. The episode supports American Red Cross, which teaches emergency preparedness and provides disaster relief across the globe.
3	"Feeding Rainbow"	Eva LaRue	February 19, 2016
Mack & Moxy zip-line over the Sky Islands in HelpeeLand with Trooper Francesca and accidentally fall on a fatigued new friend, Rainbow. He's a lethargic Pegasus who hasn't had any breakfast. Since his parents have lost their jobs, there's not enough food to eat. Rainbow's strength is renewed once the Heroes locate a nearby food pantry and enjoy a nutritious feast. But Shelfish Sheldon jets ahead on a flying vacuum, trying to swoop the Great Helpee and keep all its happiness for himself. The episode supports Feeding America, an organization that feeds 46 million people every day across the US.
4	"A Ty-Grrrr's Tale"	Eva LaRue	February 26, 2016
Mack & Moxy hula to HelpeeLand, along with Trooper Tyree, to rescue another Great Helpee. While in the Cool Green Jungle, they're pounced on by a playful cub named Ty the Grrrr who explains how all his friends have moved away because there's nowhere left to live. Together they find a solution. And of course, Shelfish Sheldon tries to snatch the Great Helpee first so he can keep all its happiness for himself. The episode supports the World Wildlife Fund, which is committed to saving nature, conserving habitats, and protecting wildlife.
5	"A Bop-Topus' Garden"	Melissa Fumero	March 4, 2016
Mack & Moxy, along with Trooper Georgia, plunge in to Helpee Land Sea and get hugged by a bubbly octopus named Penny and her multi-tasking mom, Mrs. Squiggly. As they bop their way toward the Great Helpee, Mrs. Squiggly loses steam because she's been too busy to eat properly. Together the Heroes grow their own nutritious garden and with the energy from fresh fruits and vegetables, save the day! Meanwhile, Shelfish Sheldon spies and swiftly swims to the Great Helpee so he can keep all its happiness for himself. The episode supports the American Heart Association, which has helped build heart-healthy lives for kids, families, and communities since 1924.
6	"Get Up, Get Going"	Rachael Ray	March 11, 2016
Mack & Moxy jump into action with Trooper Lauren and bump into a friendly teenager named Blump who spends his time playing video games and eating candy bars. When asked to help the Heroes find the Great Helpee at the top of the mountain, Blump slumps and sighs. But once he breaks a sweat and gets into shape bike riding, hooping, and hiking up the hill, he reaps the rewards of exercise. As always, Shelfish Sheldon tries to beat them to the Great Helpee so he can keep all its happiness for himself. The episode supports the President's Council on Fitness, Sports & Nutrition, whose mission is to engage, educate, and empower all Americans to adopt a healthy lifestyle that includes regular physical activity and good nutrition.
7	"A Spectrum of Possibilities"	Matt Lucas	March 18, 2016
Mack & Moxy are joined by Trooper Charlie, a boy with autism. They land high atop a colorful tree and see a Little Bird building his nest nearby. Confused as to why their new friend won't look at or talk to them, Trooper Charlie recognizes that Little Bird also has autism. Once they all celebrate the joys of being different, Little Bird's unique talents help them find their way to the Great Helpee! But cliff-climbing Shelfish Sheldon almost has it in his grasp, eager to keep all its happiness for himself. The episode supports Easter Seals, an international charitable organization devoted to providing opportunities for children and adults with physical disabilities.
8	"S.T.E.M. Strong"	Eva LaRue	March 25, 2016
On this mission to save another Great Helpee, the Heroes need Science, Technology, Engineering and Math. With Trooper Xolo, an aspiring engineer, Mack & Moxy head to HelpeeLand and come across a math-loving new friend named Munch Munch. But they're in for a big surprise when they discover that the Great Helpee is hatching atop a volcano covered in hot lava! Together they solve the problem by building a robot. Only one variable – Shelfish Sheldon is bounding up the hillside on a pogo stick, perfectly poised to pounce and keep all the Great Helpee's happiness for himself. The episode supports Citizen Schools, an education program that, through mentoring, helps thousands of middle school students across the US discover and achieve their dreams.
9	"Ready, Set, Hike!"	Kellee McQuinn	April 1, 2016
Mack & Moxy head to HelpeeLand National Park with Trooper Tigran. They're welcomed by Ranger Rosey, an extroverted outdoor enthusiast who is delighted to introduce them to the wonders of nature. Along the way they breathe in the fresh air, explore the terrain, discover different types of plants, learn about the park's history, and take photos to share, inspiring others to enjoy the majestic lands. But sharing doesn't work for Shelfish Sheldon, who scrambles to the Great Helpee, set on keeping all its happiness for himself. The episode supports the National Park Foundation, the official charity of America's national parks.
10	"Buckle, Buckle, Seatbelts and Chuckle"	Keegan-Michael Key	April 8, 2016
As Mack & Moxy head out on a road trip with Trooper Sade, they wind up on the wrong side of HelpeeLand. The Heroes meet a happy young duckling named Chuckle and luckily get a ride from Mr. Roadster, an open-aired mini-van who happily beeps, honks, and toots along the canyon. As they sit in their proper car seats and buckle up for safety, they hit the road heading to the Great Helpee. But Shelfish is zooming along ahead of them, confident that this time he'll keep all its happiness for himself! The episode supports Safe Kids Worldwide, a global organization dedicated to protecting kids from unintentional injuries.
11	"Play It Again, Mack"	Simone Biles	April 15, 2016
Mack & Moxy team up with Trooper Sydnee to save another Great Helpee. When they bounce over to HelpeeLand School, they run into a rabbit named Patch who is sad because recess has become too rowdy and no one wants to play anymore. To cheer Patch up, the Heroes start a lively game of foursquare. But when a disagreement develops over who won, Trooper Sydnee suggests Rock, Paper, Scissors to settle the dispute. It works like a charm except for one problem – Shelfish Sheldon is about to snatch the Great Helpee and keep all its happiness for himself! The episode supports PlayWorks, a nation-wide program that supports learning and physical health by providing safe and inclusive play to low-income students in urban schools.
12	"You're My Hero"	Dean Norris	April 22, 2016
Mack & Moxy and Trooper Noel meet Sheriff Hiya, an amiable eagle who's always of service to the residents of HelpeeLand. As the Sheriff's assistance is requested by a neighbor in need, the Heroes continue on their journey. But when Shelfish Sheldon plays a sneaky trick so he can keep the Great Helpee for himself, the Heroes fall to the bottom of a very deep pit and can't get out. Then they remember Sheriff Hiya's advice about dialing 9-1-1 if there's an emergency. They call the number and help is immediately on its way – just in time for the Great Helpee to hatch! The episode supports the Orange County Sheriff's Department and local law enforcement.

== Awards ==
- 2016: Won the Parents' Choice Award for Spring 2016 Television
