= Animal Friends =

Upcoming film by Peter Atencio

- Official logo
- Directed by: Peter Atencio
- Written by: Kevin Burrows; Matt Mider
- Produced by: Cale Boyter; Peter Atencio
- Starring: Ryan Reynolds; Jason Momoa; Aubrey Plaza; Daniel Levy; Addison Rae; Ellie Bamber; Lil Rel Howery
- Cinematography: Magdalena Górka
- Edited by: David Heinz
- Music by: Joseph Trapanese
- Production companies: Legendary Pictures; Maximum Effort; Prime Focus Studios
- Distributed by: Warner Bros. Pictures
- Release date: January 22, 2027
- Country: United States
- Language: English

Animal Friends is an upcoming American live-action animated adventure comedy film directed by Peter Atencio. The film features the voices of Ryan Reynolds, Jason Momoa, and Lil Rel Howery, with Aubrey Plaza, Daniel Levy, Addison Rae, and Ellie Bamber in live-action roles.

Animal Friends is scheduled to be released in the United States by Warner Bros. Pictures on January 22, 2027.

== Premise ==
"Two fugitive animals, Pony (voiced by Ryan Reynolds) and Bear (voiced by Jason Momoa), hit the road on a cross-country adventure across America to return to the ranch that was once their home, healing their fractured friendship while being pursued by an equally 'odd-couple' DEA agent (Aubrey Plaza) and Fish & Wildlife ranger (Daniel Levy) with something to prove."

== Cast ==
- Ryan Reynolds as the voice of Pony
- Jason Momoa as the voice of Bear
- Aubrey Plaza as Billie, a DEA agent
- Daniel Levy as a Fish & Wildlife ranger
- Vince Vaughn
- Addison Rae
- Eric André
- Lil Rel Howery as the voice of a bird
- Ellie Bamber as Patsy
  - Lily Hopwood as young Patsy
- Rob Delaney
- Joaquim De Almeida
- Reis Daniel as Zane
- Peter Atencio

== Production ==
The project was announced in April 2023, with Ryan Reynolds, Jason Momoa, Vince Vaughn and Aubrey Plaza announced to star, and Peter Atencio set to direct. Addison Rae would join the cast the following month. Daniel Levy joined the cast in February 2024. Lil Rel Howery, Ellie Bamber, Joaquim De Almeida and Eric André would join the cast in the following months. In March 2025, Rob Delaney joined the cast.

DNEG announced the film had entered production in June 2023. One of the filming locations included Bulgaria. Filming concluded on April 17, 2024.

In July 2025, it was announced that Joseph Trapanese would compose the film's score.

== Release ==
Animal Friends is scheduled to be released in the United States by Warner Bros. Pictures on January 22, 2027. It was originally scheduled to be released in the United States on August 15, 2025, by Sony Pictures Releasing under Columbia Pictures. It was later announced on December 9, 2024, that distribution rights had shifted to Warner Bros., which scheduled the film for a theatrical release on October 10, 2025. It was then pushed back to May 1, 2026, and then again to June 5, 2026, to take advantage of the summer season. It was finally pushed again to its January date, in order to accommodate the cast's availability to promote the film.
