= List of Key & Peele episodes =

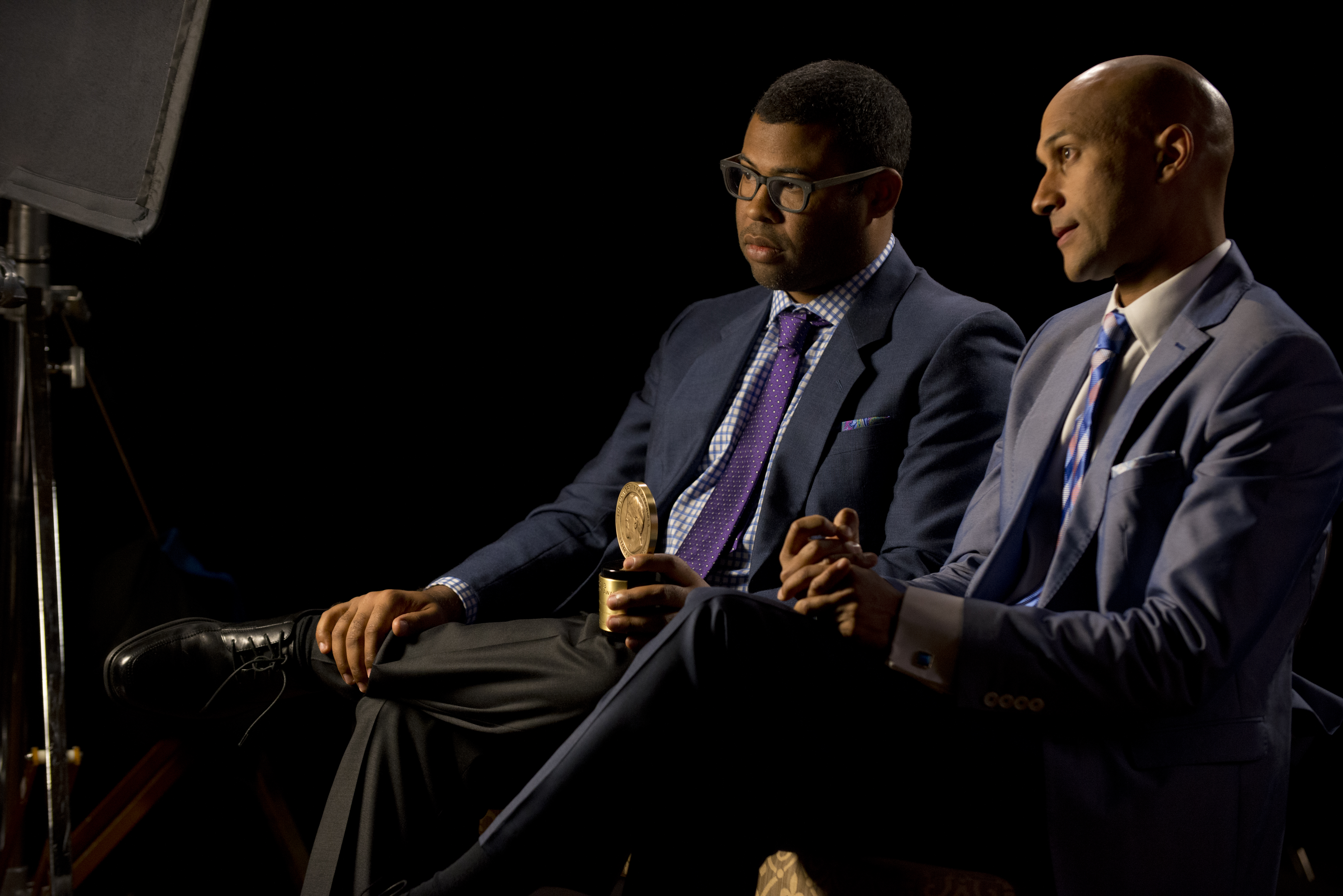
Jordan Peele and Keegan-Michael Key during the Peabody interview for Key & Peele

Key & Peele is an American sketch comedy television series starring Keegan-Michael Key and Jordan Peele, both former cast members of MADtv. Each episode of the series consists of several pre-taped sketches starring the two actors. The sketches cover a variety of societal topics, often with a focus on African-American culture and race relations. The series premiered on January 31, 2012, and ended on September 9, 2015, with a total of 53 episodes, over the course of five seasons. A special entitled "Key & Peele's Super Bowl Special" aired on January 30, 2015.

Their first episode was Obama's Anger Translator.

== Series overview ==
Season	Episodes	Originally released	
Season	Episodes	First released	Last released
1	8	January 31, 2012	March 20, 2012
2	10	September 26, 2012	November 28, 2012
3	13	September 18, 2013	December 18, 2013
4	11	September 24, 2014	December 10, 2014
Special		January 30, 2015	
5	11	July 8, 2015	September 9, 2015

== Episodes ==
=== Season 1 (2012) ===
No. overall	No. in season	Title	Directed by	Written by	Original release date	Prod. code	US viewers (millions)
1	1	"Series Premiere"	Peter Atencio	Sean Conroy, Rebecca Drysdale, Colton Dunn, Keegan-Michael Key, Phil Augusta Jackson, Jay Martel, Jordan Peele, Ian Roberts, Alex Rubens, Charlie Sanders	January 31, 2012	101	2.08
Two black men on their cell phones adopt more urban mannerisms when they see each other. Two friends relate anecdotes to one another about how they are each the dominant partner in their relationships, but only when their wives are not around to hear them. A contestant on the reality cooking show Gideon's Kitchen can't figure out if Chef Gideon loves or hates his dish. A reality camera crew follows the life of Lil Wayne in prison (three-part sketch). A parody commercial for Ancestry.com shows all black people tracing their heritage back to Thomas Jefferson. A man tries to fake a disease to get a prescription for medicinal marijuana. President Obama hires an anger translator named Luther to help him express his strong emotions. Guest stars: Marc Evan Jackson, Matt L. Jones, Jim Turner
2	2	"Black Hawk Up"	Peter Atencio	Sean Conroy, Rebecca Drysdale, Colton Dunn, Keegan-Michael Key, Phil Augusta Jackson, Jay Martel, Jordan Peele, Ian Roberts, Alex Rubens, Charlie Sanders	February 7, 2012	102	1.82
A street rapper loses a battle rap to President Obama. A "Yo Mama" champion meets with a doctor about his mother's health. A substitute helicopter traffic reporter gets more than he bargained for in his turbulent ride. Two women in a club fail to get good pictures of themselves as a gunman robs the place and end up arrested for destroying evidence. Community theater actors portraying Martin Luther King Jr. and Malcolm X try to curry the audience's favor. A '90s R&B singer expresses his true feelings to his male co-performer while performing on stage at a concert. Guest star: Lance Barber
3	3	"Das Negros"	Peter Atencio	Sean Conroy, Rebecca Drysdale, Colton Dunn, Keegan-Michael Key, Phil Augusta Jackson, Jay Martel, Jordan Peele, Ian Roberts, Alex Rubens, Charlie Sanders	February 14, 2012	103	1.58
Two men yell cat calls at an oncoming woman, only to realize their mistake once the "woman" gets closer. In 1848, two slaves on the auction block become increasingly agitated as they are continually passed over from being bought. While on a date, a biracial man gets confused as to when to use his "black" side and when to use his "white" side in order to receive good service at a restaurant. In Nazi Germany, two black men in whiteface avoid detection from an SS officer. Two movie theater hecklers annoy theatergoers with insightful criticism. Just as two gangstas are about to execute a hit, one of them accidentally defecates in his pants. Guest stars: Ty Burrell, Larry Joe Campbell, Drew Droege, Josh Fadem
4	4	"The Branding"	Peter Atencio	Sean Conroy, Rebecca Drysdale, Colton Dunn, Keegan-Michael Key, Phil Augusta Jackson, Jay Martel, Jordan Peele, Ian Roberts, Alex Rubens, Charlie Sanders	February 21, 2012	104	1.73
Two bank robbers' plot to score a fortune turns out to be a plan to get a job at the bank. Two hyped-up frat brothers brand their fraternity's letters into each other's bodies, with one mistakenly getting phallic results. A riot breaks out after residents of a black neighborhood buy into a television news crew's fabricated Pegasus sighting. A smartphone app lets people know when they can use the N-word. A guest player in a tabletop role-playing game breaks the rules by robbing the local tavern and hooking-up with women instead of going on a quest. A musician who just finds out he'll be making a record is suddenly inundated by old friends and strangers who want to leech off of his success. For the upcoming presidential election, President Obama uses his anger "translator" to remind America he took down Osama bin Laden. A rap singer's music video chronicles him getting shot in the penis. Guest stars: Jordan Black, Rob Delaney, Daniele Gaither, Anders Holm, Jerry Minor, Cedric Yarbrough
5	5	"Gay Marriage Legalized"	Peter Atencio	Sean Conroy, Rebecca Drysdale, Colton Dunn, Keegan-Michael Key, Phil Augusta Jackson, Jay Martel, Jordan Peele, Ian Roberts, Alex Rubens, Charlie Sanders	February 28, 2012	105	1.60
During the zombie apocalypse, a survivor is mixed up about what kind of bites are dangerous. Two wise, old black men use their magical powers to battle for the rights as "Magical Negroes" to advise a young man going through hard times. A passenger messes with his driver when he thinks the driver isn't really listening to him. Jaden Smith fails to properly understand the script his agent is pitching him. News anchor Rex Chamber's overblown story about a missing white baby is cut short when the baby is found. One half of a gay couple isn't nearly as excited as his partner is after the legalization of gay marriage. When no one cares about Rex Chamber's report on a missing black baby, he provides an update on the previously missing white baby. President Obama uses reverse psychology to get a group of Republicans to agree with his policies. Guest stars: Anna Maria Horsford, Paul F. Tompkins
6	6	"Flash Mob"	Peter Atencio	Sean Conroy, Rebecca Drysdale, Colton Dunn, Keegan-Michael Key, Phil Augusta Jackson, Jay Martel, Jordan Peele, Ian Roberts, Alex Rubens, Charlie Sanders	March 6, 2012	106	1.53
An all-black flash mob is mistaken for a race war. Two co-workers' fake-out game of "You've got something on your shirt" turns epic. A wedding guest and a DJ have differing opinions on old school music. A snobbish barbecue guest is horrified that the grass-fed Kobe beef he brought is being treated like common hamburger. Two black friends at a bar are repeatedly bothered by people afflicted with white guilt. In the promo for an upcoming MMA match, one fighter is unnerved by his opponent's smack talk. Guest stars: Stephanie Allynne, Carla Gallo, Ryan Hansen, Ken Marino
7	7	"Bobby McFerrin Vs Michael Winslow"	Peter Atencio	Sean Conroy, Rebecca Drysdale, Colton Dunn, Keegan-Michael Key, Phil Augusta Jackson, Jay Martel, Jordan Peele, Ian Roberts, Alex Rubens, Charlie Sanders	March 13, 2012	107	1.40
A dap farewell goes awkwardly wrong. Ordering at a soul food restaurant turns into a competition between two customers. A man finds himself constantly cockblocked by his friend. Two girlfriends coo over what they would do to the cute puppy they see in a shop window. In a Bobby McFerrin vs. Michael Winslow mouth noise-off, only one can survive. An offhand remark leads a man to be snapped up by the Tea Party as their token black spokesperson. A husband quickly learns to never again take a cellphone snapshot of his wife waking up; later, when he comes home, his negligee-wearing wife entices him to reveal a final fantasy. A pair of military recruiters go clubbing to reach a new demographic. Guest stars: Matt Besser, Michelle Buteau, Rob Delaney, Jeremy Rowley, Janet Varney
8	8	"Babysitting Forest Whitaker"	Peter Atencio	Sean Conroy, Rebecca Drysdale, Colton Dunn, Keegan-Michael Key, Phil Augusta Jackson, Jay Martel, Jordan Peele, Ian Roberts, Alex Rubens, Charlie Sanders	March 20, 2012	108	1.23
While out with Malia driving and, later, at an ATM, President Obama unwisely insists that people treat them as if he is not the president but an ordinary citizen. A man feels the need to sing his feelings about his friend to him. During their tour of an apartment, a couple discovers that the neighbourhood isn't quite "turning around" the way they thought it was. A documentary follows the top bar and bat mitzvah "party motivators" in Nassau County, Marcus "Dr. Dreidel" Cunningham and Leonard "Gafilta Fresh" Jeffries. When one gangster laughs at the other's shooting of a man, the killer doesn't get the joke. A man babysits an infant Forest Whitaker. Guest stars: Jamie Denbo, Peter Grosz, Andy Pessoa

=== Season 2 (2012) ===
No. overall	No. in season	Title	Directed by	Written by	Original release date	Prod. code	US viewers (millions)
9	1	"Obama College Years"	Peter Atencio	Rebecca Drysdale, Colton Dunn, Keegan-Michael Key, Phil Augusta Jackson, Jay Martel, Jordan Peele, Ian Roberts, Alex Rubens, Charlie Sanders	September 26, 2012	201	1.07
Sketches include a first-hand look at President Barack Obama during his college years; crashing a Civil War reenactment, and Jesus's run-in with a dangerous pimp.
10	2	"Dubstep"	Peter Atencio	Rebecca Drysdale, Colton Dunn, Keegan-Michael Key, Phil Augusta Jackson, Jay Martel, Jordan Peele, Ian Roberts, Alex Rubens, Charlie Sanders	October 3, 2012	202	1.09
Sketches include President Obama and his anger translator, Luther, addressing Mitt Romney; we meet the man who had to follow Martin Luther King Jr.'s 1963 "I Have A Dream" speech; the East/West Collegiate Bowl, and two friends discuss their theories on what happens to their poop after they flush.
11	3	"Puppy Dog Ice-T"	Peter Atencio	Rebecca Drysdale, Colton Dunn, Keegan-Michael Key, Phil Augusta Jackson, Jay Martel, Jordan Peele, Ian Roberts, Alex Rubens, Charlie Sanders	October 10, 2012	203	1.39
Sketches include Steve Jobs' successor; Ice-T's puppy, Rihanna and Chris Brown give it another shot, and two valets who love Liam Neeson.
12	4	"I'm Retired"	Peter Atencio	Rebecca Drysdale, Colton Dunn, Keegan-Michael Key, Phil Augusta Jackson, Jay Martel, Jordan Peele, Ian Roberts, Alex Rubens, Charlie Sanders	October 17, 2012	204	1.16
Sketches include a bachelor party that gets weird, and a black kid with a white penis.
13	5	"Bone Thugs-n-Homeless"	Peter Atencio	Rebecca Drysdale, Colton Dunn, Keegan-Michael Key, Phil Augusta Jackson, Jay Martel, Jordan Peele, Ian Roberts, Alex Rubens, Charlie Sanders	October 24, 2012	205	1.08
Sketches include a dog terrorizing a news reporter, and Harriet Tubman free running.
14	6	"Michael Jackson Halloween"	Peter Atencio	Rebecca Drysdale, Colton Dunn, Keegan-Michael Key, Phil Augusta Jackson, Jay Martel, Jordan Peele, Ian Roberts, Alex Rubens, Charlie Sanders	October 31, 2012	206	1.41
Sketches include Jordan and Keegan celebrating Halloween by fleeing racist zombies; the stars of "Human Centipede" have a scary reunion, and we visit a struggling public wizard school.
15	7	"Non-Stop Party"	Peter Atencio	Rebecca Drysdale, Colton Dunn, Keegan-Michael Key, Phil Augusta Jackson, Jay Martel, Jordan Peele, Ian Roberts, Alex Rubens, Charlie Sanders	November 7, 2012	207	1.42
Sketches include a guy chasing his girlfriend to the ends of the Earth, and LMFAO literally cannot stop partying.
16	8	"Manly Tears"	Peter Atencio	Rebecca Drysdale, Colton Dunn, Keegan-Michael Key, Phil Augusta Jackson, Jay Martel, Jordan Peele, Ian Roberts, Alex Rubens, Charlie Sanders	November 14, 2012	209	0.90
Sketches include a drug deal that goes bad, a mobster who is a big cry baby, and Darius Rucker dealing with his Hootie past.
17	9	"Gangsta Standoff"	Peter Atencio	Rebecca Drysdale, Colton Dunn, Keegan-Michael Key, Phil Augusta Jackson, Jay Martel, Jordan Peele, Ian Roberts, Alex Rubens, Charlie Sanders	November 21, 2012	208	0.90
Sketches include gangsters sharing a passion for "Twilight," visiting a world where names are farts, and racist superheroes when Brenda (as Purple Falcon), Rob (as Blue Falcon), Kristanna (as Red Falcon) and the foreign-looking Keegan (as Yellow Falcon) calls Jordan (as Green Falcon) "Black Falcon" during a serious battle with a giant robot.
18	10	"Dueling Hats"	Peter Atencio	Rebecca Drysdale, Colton Dunn, Keegan-Michael Key, Phil Augusta Jackson, Jay Martel, Jordan Peele, Ian Roberts, Alex Rubens, Charlie Sanders	November 28, 2012	210	1.14
Sketches are "Post-Apocalyptic Hunt", Peele meeting his father, a gay couple having an adoption, the New Black Panther party, "Damn, Check That S**t Out", "Why Does Everyone Love Hanging Out at Barbershops?", "Dueling Hats".

=== Season 3 (2013) ===
No. overall	No. in season	Title	Directed by	Written by	Original release date	Prod. code	US viewers (millions)
19	1	"Les Mis"	Peter Atencio	Rebecca Drysdale, Colton Dunn, Keegan-Michael Key, Phil Augusta Jackson, Jay Martel, Jordan Peele, Ian Roberts, Alex Rubens, Charlie Sanders	September 18, 2013	301	1.35
Sketches are "Hoodie", "Substitute Teacher Pt. 2", "This Hype Man Is Too Much", Jordan's girlfriend catching him watching porn, "Les Mis", Obama gives an address on spying on citizens with his anger translator Luther, and Metta World News having a take on cat litter.
20	2	"East/West Bowl Rap"	Peter Atencio	Rebecca Drysdale, Colton Dunn, Keegan-Michael Key, Phil Augusta Jackson, Jay Martel, Jordan Peele, Ian Roberts, Alex Rubens, Charlie Sanders	September 25, 2013	302	1.72
Sketches are "Jacqueline and Denise", "East/West Bowl Rap Showdown", "Nervous Mob Boss", an inner-city man has his own 'Ratatouille', a CIA interrogation has the wrong subject, Metta World News with a rhetoric, and the two valet guys having trouble believing anyone would mess with the Batmans.
21	3	"Slap-Ass"	Peter Atencio	Rebecca Drysdale, Colton Dunn, Keegan-Michael Key, Phil Augusta Jackson, Jay Martel, Jordan Peele, Ian Roberts, Alex Rubens, Charlie Sanders	October 2, 2013	303	1.57
Sketches are the guys having a bad Skype connection, a Django Unchained slave fight, "Proud Thug", "Black Republicans", "Slap-Ass" and Metta World News gets philosophical.
22	4	"Boarding Group One"	Peter Atencio	Rebecca Drysdale, Colton Dunn, Keegan-Michael Key, Phil Augusta Jackson, Jay Martel, Jordan Peele, Ian Roberts, Alex Rubens, Charlie Sanders	October 9, 2013	304	1.51
Sketches are growing up with "Adversity", "Boarding Order", "Nooice", "Boxing Press Conference", a thug refusing to pour out his 40, and "L.A. Vice".
23	5	"Obama Shutdown"	Peter Atencio	Rebecca Drysdale, Colton Dunn, Keegan-Michael Key, Phil Augusta Jackson, Jay Martel, Jordan Peele, Ian Roberts, Alex Rubens, Charlie Sanders	October 16, 2013	305	1.40
Sketches are "Let Me Hit That", "Obama Shutdown", the founding fathers trying to draw up the Second Amendment, "Fútbol Flop", a black person walking into an orgy of white people, Metta World News talks about genies, "The World’s Worst Liar".
24	6	"Cunnilingus Class"	Peter Atencio	Rebecca Drysdale, Colton Dunn, Keegan-Michael Key, Phil Augusta Jackson, Jay Martel, Jordan Peele, Ian Roberts, Alex Rubens, Charlie Sanders	October 23, 2013	306	1.04
Sketches are a football player giving an interview, Wendell calls the customer service about his Superman bed, "When Mr. T Won’t Leave You Alone", "Valets talk about Mel Gibson", "Cunnilingus Class", Metta World News on ninja costumes, "An Insult Comic Meets His Match".
25	7	"Sexy Vampires"	Peter Atencio	Rebecca Drysdale, Colton Dunn, Keegan-Michael Key, Phil Augusta Jackson, Jay Martel, Jordan Peele, Ian Roberts, Alex Rubens, Charlie Sanders	October 30, 2013	307	1.20
Sketches are "Roommate Meeting", "Sexy Vampires", acting as zombie extras, "Continental Breakfast", "Psycho Clown". The vampire sketch is a reference to the 1987 horror comedy movie The Lost Boys, with Peele doing an impression of the main character of the movie, the evil vampire David, impersonated by the actor and singer Kiefer Sutherland.
26	8	"Joke Stealing"	Peter Atencio	Rebecca Drysdale, Colton Dunn, Keegan-Michael Key, Phil Augusta Jackson, Jay Martel, Jordan Peele, Ian Roberts, Alex Rubens, Charlie Sanders	November 6, 2013	308	1.72
Sketches are a meth sale, "High On Potenuse", Jordan and Keegan attending the premiere of "Othello", "Pulling my Leg", "McCringleberry's Excessive Celebration", "Offensive Boss".
27	9	"Meegan's Fight"	Peter Atencio	Rebecca Drysdale, Colton Dunn, Keegan-Michael Key, Phil Augusta Jackson, Jay Martel, Jordan Peele, Ian Roberts, Alex Rubens, Charlie Sanders	November 13, 2013	309	1.43
Sketches are "Sleep Talker", "Fighting Meegan's Battles", "Pretty Sure This Guy Isn’t a Real Sensei", "Crosswalk", Jordan trying to look cool at a strip club, a black person tries to break down stereotypes, "Funky Nonsense".
28	10	"Black Ice"	Peter Atencio	Rebecca Drysdale, Colton Dunn, Keegan-Michael Key, Phil Augusta Jackson, Jay Martel, Jordan Peele, Ian Roberts, Alex Rubens, Charlie Sanders	November 20, 2013	310	1.47
Sketches are a white person trying to talk to black people, "Black Ice", "Filling Jimenez’s Shoes", "Lando's Fan", Metta World News on feral cats, two jazz musicians battle on the stage, the couple from Gay Marriage Legalized, returns.
29	11	"The Power of Wings"	Peter Atencio	Rebecca Drysdale, Colton Dunn, Keegan-Michael Key, Phil Augusta Jackson, Jay Martel, Jordan Peele, Ian Roberts, Alex Rubens, Charlie Sanders	December 4, 2013	311	1.51
Sketches are two black men listen to two white women comparing black and white men, "Why British Actors End Up with All the Good Roles", "Wendell - The Power of Wings", "Karim and Jahar Scope Out the Gym", "Pawn Shop", Metta World News on athletes.
30	12	"East/West Bowl 2"	Peter Atencio	Rebecca Drysdale, Colton Dunn, Keegan-Michael Key, Phil Augusta Jackson, Jay Martel, Jordan Peele, Ian Roberts, Alex Rubens, Charlie Sanders	December 11, 2013	312	1.49
Sketches are "Paint Boobs", "East/West College Bowl 2", "Office Homophobe", a cult has a mass suicide, "Shady Landlord", Metta World News on knocking yourself out, a father and son talk about the child's fears.
31	13	"Pussy on the Chainwax"	Peter Atencio	Rebecca Drysdale, Colton Dunn, Keegan-Michael Key, Phil Augusta Jackson, Jay Martel, Jordan Peele, Ian Roberts, Alex Rubens, Charlie Sanders	December 18, 2013	313	1.17
Sketches are a man loses a brother but gets another one, "Pussy on the Chainwax", the valets talk about Anne Hathaway, "Dad's Hollywood Secret", "Is This Guy’s Boss Even Real?", a cop is reluctant to pull the trigger, "People Park".

=== Season 4 (2014) ===
Instead of the typical onstage routine in front of a live audience like in previous seasons, season 4 made use of the clips of a long-running sketch of Key and Peele discussing various topics related to the next sketch while they were driving on a long road in the middle of a desert in between sketches.

No. overall	No. in season	Title	Directed by	Written by	Original release date	Prod. code	US viewers (millions)
32	1	"Alien Imposters"	Peter Atencio	Rebecca Drysdale, Colton Dunn, Keegan-Michael Key, Phil Augusta Jackson, Jay Martel, Jordan Peele, Ian Roberts, Alex Rubens, Charlie Sanders	September 24, 2014	401	1.61
Sketches are a bank robbery goes wrong, two friends have a road trip extended throughout the season as a replacement of their on-stage segment, the survivors of an alien invasion find out whom they can trust, a drill sergeant sings an unconventional marching song, a family has a briefing on a gay wedding, Obama greets his supporters, Rednecks with some different stereotypes, a pop sensation answers questions from her fans.
33	2	"Little Homie"	Peter Atencio	Rebecca Drysdale, Colton Dunn, Keegan-Michael Key, Phil Augusta Jackson, Jay Martel, Jordan Peele, Ian Roberts, Alex Rubens, Charlie Sanders	October 1, 2014	402	1.61
Sketches are a different line up of sports news, a parole officer uses a puppet to connect with convicts, a veteran returns home, a Nazi officer tells the story of the time he saw Hitler, a man makes a nuisance of himself in a club after a neck surgery, and Levi goes steampunk.
34	3	"Georgina and Esther and Satan"	Peter Atencio	Rebecca Drysdale, Colton Dunn, Keegan-Michael Key, Phil Augusta Jackson, Jay Martel, Jordan Peele, Ian Roberts, Alex Rubens, Charlie Sanders	October 8, 2014	403	1.11
Sketches are a donation drive gets real, two pious women fight with Satan, text messages are perceived incorrectly, and a weird song plays at a dance club, an odd situation occurs at a mattress store, a friend gets too excited over a joke.
35	4	"Slap-Ass: In Recovery"	Peter Atencio	Rebecca Drysdale, Colton Dunn, Keegan-Michael Key, Phil Augusta Jackson, Jay Martel, Jordan Peele, Ian Roberts, Alex Rubens, Charlie Sanders	October 15, 2014	404	1.31
The dentist's anesthetic does not work as intended, Slap-Ass returns after treatment, a baseball player is in recovery, Steve Urkel drives a Family Matters co-star insane, a date at a French restaurant gets too sophisticated, and a mobster seeks revenge.
36	5	"Quarterback Concussion"	Peter Atencio	Rebecca Drysdale, Colton Dunn, Keegan-Michael Key, Phil Augusta Jackson, Jay Martel, Jordan Peele, Ian Roberts, Alex Rubens, Charlie Sanders	October 22, 2014	405	1.20
A masseur delivers a massage to a first-timer, a quarterback spurs on his team, a dying woman talks to her husband from her bed, Laron cannot laugh, a passionate restaurant owner caters to two of his guests, and a husband suspects his wife is cheating on him.
37	6	"Scariest Movie Ever"	Peter Atencio	Rebecca Drysdale, Colton Dunn, Keegan-Michael Key, Phil Augusta Jackson, Jay Martel, Jordan Peele, Ian Roberts, Alex Rubens, Charlie Sanders	October 29, 2014	406	1.18
Two women are a little too polite at the door, two men chat about a horror movie, a detective searches in a maze of mirrors, three men are caught smoking by an odd man, an autopsy goes awry, and a child surprises the Make-A-Wish Foundation, a man realizes he was saved by Obamacare.
38	7	"Sex Detective"	Peter Atencio	Rebecca Drysdale, Colton Dunn, Keegan-Michael Key, Phil Augusta Jackson, Jay Martel, Jordan Peele, Ian Roberts, Alex Rubens, Charlie Sanders	November 5, 2014	407	1.13
The black republicans return to drive voters to their voting centre, a crime detective reconstructs and solves a case by masturbating, a retro action hero infiltrates a Colombian crime boss' residence and President Obama addresses his critics, a veteran comes to pick his girlfriend up at the yogurt shop.
39	8	"Terrible Henchman"	Peter Atencio	Rebecca Drysdale, Colton Dunn, Keegan-Michael Key, Phil Augusta Jackson, Jay Martel, Jordan Peele, Ian Roberts, Alex Rubens, Charlie Sanders	November 12, 2014	408	1.14
Two men have an encounter at the urinals, an incompetent henchman keeps interrupting his boss' torture session, motivational speaker at a school assembly discusses his imaginative life and its consequences, a man pretends to know the lyrics on a road trip, and a man tries to prove he's all grown up.
40	9	"Aerobics Meltdown"	Peter Atencio	Rebecca Drysdale, Colton Dunn, Keegan-Michael Key, Phil Augusta Jackson, Jay Martel, Jordan Peele, Ian Roberts, Alex Rubens, Charlie Sanders	November 19, 2014	409	1.03
Two men try to remember their parking spot, a 1980's fit dancer receives tragic news about his family in the middle of a live show, a man tries to bond with his stepson-to-be, Stan Lee pitches new superhero ideas to younger Marvel colleagues and an undercover police officer gets a terrible brain freeze.
41	10	"Sex Addict Wendell"	Peter Atencio	Rebecca Drysdale, Colton Dunn, Keegan-Michael Key, Phil Augusta Jackson, Jay Martel, Jordan Peele, Ian Roberts, Alex Rubens, Charlie Sanders	December 3, 2014	410	1.22
A country tries to negotiate for U.S. military intervention, Wendell attends a sex addict support group, a school teacher has a bad time calming down a class clown, K&P put up an abstract art show, and two jazz musicians have a scat singing battle.
42	11	"Terrorist Meeting"	Peter Atencio	Rebecca Drysdale, Colton Dunn, Keegan-Michael Key, Phil Augusta Jackson, Jay Martel, Jordan Peele, Ian Roberts, Alex Rubens, Charlie Sanders	December 10, 2014	411	1.22
An expert debates the legacy of Obama on TV, a group of terrorists denounce TSA, a gangster tries to prove that he's the craziest of them all, a man invites his older brother to be his best man, and Meegan has a hard time finding her seat at a theater.

=== Special (2015) ===
Title	Directed by	Written by	Original release date	US viewers (millions)
"Key & Peele's Super Bowl Special"	Ryan Polito, Payman Benz	Brendan Hunt, Keegan-Michael Key, Jordan Peele	January 30, 2015	0.77

=== Season 5 (2015) ===
No. overall	No. in season	Title	Directed by	Written by	Original release date	Prod. code	US viewers (millions)
43	1	"Y'all Ready For This?"	Peter Atencio	Rebecca Drysdale, Colton Dunn, Keegan-Michael Key, Phil Augusta Jackson, Jay Martel, Jordan Peele, Ian Roberts, Alex Rubens, Charlie Sanders	July 8, 2015	412	0.88
Two football players get overly pumped-up before a game, President Obama and his "anger translator" Luther meet Hillary Clinton and her translator Savannah, two terrorists attempt to hijack an airplane, a band of pirates sings an unusual sea shanty, and a white police officer encounters some dangerous black men.
44	2	"Airplane Showdown"	Peter Atencio	Rebecca Drysdale, Colton Dunn, Keegan-Michael Key, Phil Augusta Jackson, Jay Martel, Jordan Peele, Ian Roberts, Alex Rubens, Charlie Sanders	July 15, 2015	413	0.61
Radio hosts have very different personas off air, a flight attendant deals with a passenger who won’t fasten his seatbelt, a magic trick becomes a golden goose situation, two British anthropologists discuss their travels, the two women experts return, a prayer group receives divine intervention, and two couples try to avoid spoilers on a double date.
45	3	"A Cappella Club"	Peter Atencio	Rebecca Drysdale, Colton Dunn, Keegan-Michael Key, Phil Augusta Jackson, Jay Martel, Jordan Peele, Ian Roberts, Alex Rubens, Charlie Sanders	July 22, 2015	414	0.50
A charity has a creative solution to child soldiers, two African American students compete for their place in a school clique, Andre and Meegan go on their first date, and aspiring terrorists get involved in a lucrative food truck business, two old black men find themselves out of touch with the times.
46	4	"Severed Head Showcase"	Peter Atencio	Rebecca Drysdale, Colton Dunn, Keegan-Michael Key, Phil Augusta Jackson, Jay Martel, Jordan Peele, Ian Roberts, Alex Rubens, Charlie Sanders	July 29, 2015	415	0.58
A choir group bicker over pitch, a barbarian warrior performs a bit with a severed head for his gang, an inmate tries to trick the prison guard, a sketch where teachers were to get as much attention and pay as professional athletes, and a man who only speaks in catchphrases faces disapproval from those around him.
47	5	"Killer Concept Album"	Peter Atencio	Rebecca Drysdale, Colton Dunn, Phil Augusta Jackson, Keegan-Michael Key, Jay Martel, Jordan Peele, Ian Roberts, Alex Rubens, Charlie Sanders, Rich Talarico	August 5, 2015	416	0.47
A senator tries to quash a scandal at a press conference, a police officer interrogates a well-known rapper, and Levi shows Cedric his collection of oddities, two black men try to flirt with women, a man has an awkward encounter with his recently departed friend, a police officer takes a remark too literally.
48	6	"The Job Interview"	Peter Atencio	Rebecca Drysdale, Colton Dunn, Phil Augusta Jackson, Keegan-Michael Key, Jay Martel, Jordan Peele, Ian Roberts, Alex Rubens, Charlie Sanders, Rich Talarico	August 12, 2015	417	0.65
The host of "Judge Jessie" proves to be a jack-of-all-trades, a man cannot seem to relate to his interviewer the right way, a woman does not seem too interested in her friend's rant, the valets bond over their love of Val Kilmer, and a ill-prepared Decker heads to Afghanistan for his latest mission, a white woman invites her black boyfriend to meet her parents.
49	7	"MC MOM"	Peter Atencio	Rebecca Drysdale, Colton Dunn, Phil Augusta Jackson, Keegan-Michael Key, Jay Martel, Jordan Peele, Ian Roberts, Alex Rubens, Charlie Sanders, Rich Talarico	August 19, 2015	418	0.73
A gangster tries to do a drive by, a mother makes a rap video for her son who is away for college, two swindlers try to outsmart each other, a sketch based on Undercover Boss, Big Boi runs into André 3000 at a coffee shop, a man tries to run away after an accident.
50	8	"Hollywood Sequel Doctor"	Peter Atencio	Rebecca Drysdale, Colton Dunn, Phil Augusta Jackson, Keegan-Michael Key, Jay Martel, Jordan Peele, Ian Roberts, Alex Rubens, Charlie Sanders, Rich Talarico	August 26, 2015	419	0.57
In 1989, a group of writers try to come up with the plot for Gremlins 2 which slowly starts getting weird, Ron tries to prevent a janitor from taking food not meant for him, a man tries to avoid helping her girlfriend move, two gangsters suspect their fellow gangster might have snitched, and a man tries his best to hide his complete ignorance of global politics at a party.
51	9	"The 420 Special"	Peter Atencio	Rebecca Drysdale, Colton Dunn, Phil Augusta Jackson, Keegan-Michael Key, Jay Martel, Jordan Peele, Ian Roberts, Alex Rubens, Charlie Sanders, Rich Talarico	September 2, 2015	420	0.74
Neil deGrasse Tyson takes some time off, a man must keep it together during a job interview, a tailor has to deal with a flatulent client, the valets discuss Game of Thrones and a telemarketer comes up with a new way to do his job.
52	10	"Meegan & Andre Break Up"	Peter Atencio	Rebecca Drysdale, Colton Dunn, Phil Augusta Jackson, Keegan-Michael Key, Jay Martel, Jordan Peele, Ian Roberts, Alex Rubens, Charlie Sanders, Rich Talarico	September 9, 2015	421	0.75
A man gets in a fight in at a night club, Meegan and André have a discussion about their relationship, a famous rapper tries to walk out of an interview after an inappropriate question, an airline passenger gets a surprise promotion to premium economy and a silent film lover with a toothbrush moustache claims he does not foster any feelings for Nazism.
53	11	"The End"	Peter Atencio	Rebecca Drysdale, Colton Dunn, Phil Augusta Jackson, Keegan-Michael Key, Jay Martel, Jordan Peele, Ian Roberts, Alex Rubens, Charlie Sanders, Rich Talarico	September 9, 2015	422	0.80
Ray Parker Jr. promotes his new greatest hits album that does not include the Ghostbusters theme, a businessman can not drop a silly joke even after he hears that his parents had been in a car accident, a man calls 911 after a woman of his dreams faints, and a young black man goes down to "Negrotown". The episode ends with a blooper reel of various sketches in the show's history.

== Ratings ==
Key & Peele : U.S. viewers per episode (millions)

Season	Episode number												
Season	1	2	3	4	5	6	7	8	9	10	11	12	13
1	2.08	1.82	1.58	1.73	1.60	1.53	1.40	1.23	–				
2	1.09	1.07	1.39	1.16	1.08	1.41	1.42	0.90	0.90	1.14	–		
3	1.35	1.72	1.57	1.51	1.40	1.04	1.20	1.72	1.43	1.47	1.51	1.49	1.17
4	1.61	1.61	1.11	1.31	1.20	1.18	1.13	1.14	1.03	1.22	1.22	–	
5	0.88	0.61	0.50	0.58	0.47	0.65	0.73	0.57	0.74	0.75	0.80	–	

Audience measurement performed by Nielsen Media Research
