= Keanu (film) =

2016 film directed by Peter Atencio

- Theatrical release poster
- Directed by: Peter Atencio
- Written by: Jordan Peele; Alex Rubens
- Produced by: Jordan Peele; Keegan-Michael Key; Peter Principato; Paul Young; Joel Zadak
- Starring: Jordan Peele; Keegan-Michael Key; Method Man; Luis Guzmán; Nia Long; Will Forte
- Cinematography: Jas Shelton
- Edited by: Nicholas Monsour
- Music by: Steve Jablonsky; Nathan Whitehead
- Production companies: New Line Cinema; RatPac-Dune Entertainment; Monkeypaw Productions; Detroit Pictures; Principato-Young Entertainment
- Distributed by: Warner Bros. Pictures; Channel M (Asia)
- Release dates: March 13, 2016 (SXSW); April 29, 2016 (United States)
- Running time: 100 minutes
- Country: United States
- Language: English
- Budget: $15 million
- Box office: $20.7 million

Keanu is a 2016 American buddy action comedy film directed by Peter Atencio (in his feature length directorial debut), and written by Jordan Peele and Alex Rubens. The film stars Peele and Keegan-Michael Key in their first film as lead actors following five seasons of their sketch TV series. It also features Tiffany Haddish, Method Man, Nia Long, Will Forte, and Keanu Reeves as the voice of the title character.

The plot follows two cousins, Rell Williams and Clarence Goobril, who infiltrate a gang in order to retrieve their stolen kitten.

Filming began in New Orleans in June 2015. The film premiered at the South by Southwest Festival on March 13, 2016, and was theatrically released in North America on April 29, 2016. It received generally positive reviews from critics and was a commercial success. It grossed $20 million against its $15 million budget.

== Plot ==
Assassins the "Allentown Brothers" enter a Mexican cartel's drug-processing facility, killing everyone, including the boss, King Diaz. They try to take Diaz's kitten, Iglesias, but the kitten escapes. Recently dumped Rell Williams finds the kitten on his doorstep and names it Keanu. Two weeks later, Rell and his cousin Clarence Goobril, who live in Los Angeles, come home from seeing a movie. When they return, Rell's place has been ransacked and Keanu is missing.

Rell's next door neighbor and weed dealer Hulka tells them that the "17th St. Blips" gang may have raided Rell's looking for Hulka's drug money. Hulka sends them to a strip club, where they meet Hi-C, a female gangster, and the gang's leader Cheddar, who mistakes them for the Allentown Boys. Cheddar says he will return the kitten if they act as expert advisors for the Blips on a run to sell a new drug called "Holy Shit". After the sale run, they are abducted by the real Allentown Boys.

Rell and Clarence are tied to chairs and the Allentown Boys prepare to torture them. Keanu frees Rell and Clarence, and they grab their guns. As the Allentown boys approach them, Clarence and Rell unload the guns into them. On their way out, searching for Keanu, they run into the Blips and Cheddar forces them to come along to meet with the Mexican drug cartel the next morning.

There, the Blips meet King Diaz's cousin, Bacon Diaz, offering Clarence and Rell, ‘The Allentown Boys.’ When Bacon also demands "Iglesias", Cheddar refuses and a gunfight erupts between the two gangs. Clarence and Rell shoot their way out of the mansion pursuing Bacon, who has Keanu, only for Rell to be shot in the leg and Clarence in the hand.

Rell, who never learned to drive, hijacks Bacon's escape car with Bacon and Keanu in the back. Clarence chases them. It ends at Clarence's front yard where Rell crashes, sending Bacon flying through the broken windshield. Bacon gets up and attempts to shoot Rell, but Clarence runs him over. Again, Bacon gets up, but is shot dead by Cheddar and the Blips.

Hi-C reveals herself as an undercover police officer. She forces the Blips to drop their guns and shoots Cheddar. The police arrive. Hi-C promises to testify for leniency and agrees to go on a date with Rell after they get out of jail.

Six months later, Rell and Clarence have three weeks left on their jail sentences. They are respected by the inmates, including the Blips, for killing the Allentown Boys. Hi-C brings Keanu, telling Rell through a visitation phone that Keanu has a rare disease which will cause him to stay a kitten forever.

In a post credit scene, it is revealed that the Allentown Boys, despite suffering multiple gunshot wounds, survived and drive off into the night.

== Cast ==
- Keegan-Michael Key as Clarence "Shark Tank" Goobril and Smoke Dresden
- Jordan Peele as Rell "Tech-Tonic" Williams and Oil Dresden
- Tiffany Haddish as Trina "Hi-C" Parker
- Method Man as Cheddar
- Jason Mitchell as Bud
- Luis Guzmán as Bacon Diaz
- Nia Long as Hannah
- Will Forte as Hulka
- Darrell Britt-Gibson as Trunk
- Jamar Malachi Neighbors as Stitches
- Rob Huebel as Spencer
- Keanu Reeves as Keanu (voice)
- Anna Faris as herself (uncredited)

== Production ==
The film was officially announced by New Line Cinema in October 2014, with Peter Atencio directing. Many sites reporting on the film had initially believed it to be a parody of the then recently released John Wick, but according to Atencio the two films were developed independently of each other, and the team was initially unaware of Wick until work on Keanu was already underway. Keanu Reeves himself, who starred in Wick, was eventually in touch with the production, leading a dream sequence in the film to be modified with Reeves providing the voice of the titular kitten. Reeves originally turned down the cameo offer but changed his mind after his sister showed him the film's trailers.

In May 2015, Method Man and Will Forte joined the cast, with Darrell Britt-Gibson being added the following month. Filming began on June 1, 2015, in New Orleans, Louisiana, and concluded on July 10. Seven tabby kittens were used for the shoot. They were trained for three weeks by use of treats, meat flavored baby food and laser pointers, and when not on camera, were allowed to be played with by cast and crew during breaks. Treats were also used to train them to allow themselves to be dressed in lightweight costumes without attempting to remove them. All seven were adopted by the end of production, with Haddish adopting one and naming it 'Catatonic'. Since Key is allergic to cats, he had to take a medication in order to interact with them. Clarence was always meant to be a fan of a White musician, with the writers settling on George Michael as pre-production started. Key added that dancing to his music had him "summon everything I ever did at every school dance from 1985 to 1990". The producers then reached for Michael's managers stating that the musician would not be treated as a joke but "so cool that even drug lords got a tattoo of him", meeting his approval.

== Release ==
A work-in-progress print was screened at the South by Southwest Festival in Austin, Texas on March 13, 2016.

Warner Bros. Pictures originally scheduled the film for release on April 22, 2016, but in January 2016 the film was moved back a week to April 29, 2016.

=== Home media ===
Keanu was released on DVD and Blu-ray on August 2, 2016, by Warner Home Video.

== Reception ==
=== Box office ===
In the United States and Canada, Keanu opened alongside Mother's Day and Ratchet & Clank, and was projected to gross $10–14 million from 2,658 theaters in its opening weekend. The film made $3.5 million on its first day, including $560,000 from Thursday night previews. The film went on to gross $9.5 million over the weekend, finishing third at the box office, behind The Jungle Book ($43.7 million) and The Huntsman: Winter's War ($9.6 million). In its second weekend, the film grossed $3.3 million (a drop of 65.2%), finishing 5th, behind Captain America: Civil War ($179.1 million), The Jungle Book ($24.5 million), Mother's Day ($11.1 million) and The Huntsman: Winter's War ($3.9 million).

=== Critical response ===
On Rotten Tomatoes, the film holds an approval rating of 78% based on 182 reviews, with an average rating of 6.40/10. The site's critical consensus reads, "Keanu's absurd premise and compulsively watchable starring duo add up to an agreeably fast-paced comedy that hits more than enough targets to make up for the misses." On Metacritic, the film has a weighted average score of 63 out of 100, based on 35 critics, indicating "generally favorable" reviews. Audiences polled by CinemaScore gave the film an average grade of "B" on an A+ to F scale.

=== Accolades ===
Award	Category	Recipient(s)	Result	Ref(s)
Golden Trailer Awards	Best Comedy	"Take It"	Won	
Teen Choice Awards	Choice Movie Actor: Comedy	Keegan-Michael Key	Nominated	
Teen Choice Awards	Choice Movie Actor: Comedy	Jordan Peele	Nominated	

== See also ==
- Key & Peele
- List of comedy films of the 2010s
