= Good Luck (1996 film) =

1996 American film

- Movie Poster
- Directed by: Richard LaBrie
- Written by: Bob Comfort
- Produced by: Shirley Honickman Hahn; Andrzej Kamrowski
- Starring: Gregory Hines; Vincent D'Onofrio; Max Gail; James Earl Jones
- Cinematography: Maximo Munzi
- Edited by: Neil Grieve
- Music by: Tim Truman
- Production company: East-West Film Partners
- Distributed by: Moki
- Release date: October 1996
- Running time: 92 minutes
- Country: United States
- Language: English
- Box office: $39,962

Good Luck is a 1996 American film directed by Richard LaBrie starring Gregory Hines and Vincent D'Onofrio as two physically disabled men who come together to challenge themselves out of their unsatisfactory lives.

== Plot ==
Hines plays a former dental student, Bern Lemley, who had to quit school just before finals because of a car accident that left him in a wheelchair. D'Onofrio plays a former pro football player, Ole Olezniak, who was blinded in a freak accident on the field. Before their accidents, Bern had been a tutor for Ole, and, after quitting his post-accident job as a denture technician, he approaches Ole about teaming up to enter a white-water rafting race on Oregon's Rogue River.

== Cast ==
- Gregory Hines as Bernard "Bern" Lemley
- Vincent D'Onofrio as Tony "Ole" Olezniak
- James Earl Jones as James Bing
- Max Gail as Farmer John
- Joe Theismann as Himself
- Roy Firestone as Himself
- Maria O'Brien as Peggy
- Sarah Trigger as Heidi
- Ross Huffman-Kerr as Olsen
- Kathryn Howell as Doris
- William C. Simmonds as Steve
- Kathleen Stefano as Rhonda, The Dealer
- Maureen McVerry as Joan Redack
- Garwood Perkins as "Buzz"
- Dennis Dun as Chang
- Joe Ivy as Detective
- Diedre Kilgore as Topless Fan
- Robert O'Reilly as The Bartender
- LaReine Chabut as Castalia (uncredited)
- David Wenzel as Star Steven (uncredited)

== Production ==
The film was shot in Georgetown, California Coos Bay, Winchester Bay, and Portland, Oregon.

== Release ==
The movie had its world premiere at the 1996 Seattle Film Festival under the title The Ox and the Eye, presumably because of D'Onofrio's brute strength and Hines's ability to see. It has also been known as Guys Like Us and Gimps, a term Hines uses in the movie to refer to his and D'Onofrio's characters. It was shown as a sneak preview during the 1996 Summer Paralympics in Atlanta. It was released in theaters under its present title on March 7, 1997.

== Reception ==
Emanuel Levy of Variety found the film to be "only a notch above the inspirational earnestness of a routine telepic", but praised it for the "strong rapport" between Hines and D'Onofrio. New York Times reviewer Lawrence Van Gelder called it a "sweet, modest clone" of other inspirational movies that surpassed expectations due to its excellent acting. Similarly, John Anderson of the Los Angeles Times noted the potentially melodramatic concept, but found it to be elevated by its performances. Leah Rozen of People gave the film a positive notice, calling it "a small picture with a huge heart." Entertainment Weekly gave it a "B+" grade and said it was a "quietly quirky movie" that "turns genuinely uplifting".
