= Hey Girl (TV series) =

- Starring: Ali Wong; Daniella Pineda; JC Coccolli; Esther Povitsky; Laura Willcox; Shelby Fero; Sasheer Zamata; Emily Axford; Wendy McColm
- Country of origin: United States
- Original language: English
- No. of seasons: 1
- No. of episodes: 12

Production
- Executive producer: Catherine Whyte
- Camera setup: Multiple
- Running time: 21 minutes
- Production company: MTV Productions

Original release
- Network: MTV
- Release: July 28 – November 3, 2013

Hey Girl is an American weekly half-hour sketch comedy television series that aired on MTV. It was developed by Daniel Powell and Jessi Klein, and stars JC Coccolli, Daniella Pineda, Esther Povitsky, Ali Wong, Emily Axford, Laura Willcox, Shelby Fero, Sasheer Zamata, and Wendy McColm. It aired on Sundays at 9 pm, first in a "sneak peek" airing of four episodes on July 28, 2013, and then with an official premiere on October 27, 2013, with new episodes at 9 pm and 9:30 pm. The show was pulled from the broadcast schedule after the second week, having aired eight episodes. Four additional episodes were gradually released at MTV.com in February and March 2014.
