= Jean-Claude Van Johnson =

2016–2017 action comedy-drama series

- Genre: Action comedy; Comedy drama
- Created by: David Callaham
- Directed by: Peter Atencio
- Starring: Jean-Claude Van Damme; Kat Foster; Moisés Arias; Phylicia Rashad
- Composer: Joseph Trapanese
- Country of origin: United States
- Original language: English
- No. of seasons: 1
- No. of episodes: 6

Production
- Executive producer: Ridley Scott
- Camera setup: Single-camera
- Running time: 30 minutes
- Production companies: Scott Free Productions; Jittery Dog Productions; Amazon Studios

Original release
- Network: Amazon Prime Video
- Release: August 19, 2016 – December 15, 2017

Jean-Claude Van Johnson is an American action comedy-drama television series starring martial artist and action movie star Jean-Claude Van Damme as a fictionalized version of himself. The series was created by writer David Callaham, directed by Peter Atencio, and produced by Ridley Scott through his production studio Scott Free Productions alongside Amazon Studios. The pilot premiered on Amazon Prime Video on August 19, 2016, before it was ordered to series the following month. The remaining five episodes were released simultaneously on December 15, 2017. Despite receiving generally positive reviews from critics, the series was cancelled on January 18, 2018.

== Premise ==
The story centers on retired martial arts and action movie star Jean-Claude Van Damme playing himself. It is revealed that the movie career and personal history of Jean-Claude Van Damme is all a cover story. He is actually a secret agent known as Jean-Claude Van Johnson, aided by his personal assistant and make-up specialist who are themselves covert operatives as well – his handler and weapons master, respectively. After being out of the spy business for five years, Jean-Claude runs into his former handler Vanessa (Kat Foster) and realizes how much he misses both their work together (which made him feel like a hero) and the relationship they had. He decides to go back into action, tracking down a major drug lord only to later realize he has found a larger threat, that of terrorists who possess a weather control machine.

The show's supporting cast includes Jean-Claude's manager Jane (Phylicia Rashad) who is in reality his superior and in charge of his covert operations agency. Joining Jean-Claude and Vanessa on the missions is new weapons specialist Luis (Moisés Arias), a former child soldier who wishes he actually was just a hairstylist and make-up artist. Jean-Claude's new cover involves agreeing to star in Huck, a violent action film reimagining of Huckleberry Finn. This forces Jean-Claude to constantly deal with Gunnar (Tim Peper), the movie's self-absorbed director, in between his spy work. Throughout the series, Jean-Claude runs across Filip (also played by Van Damme), a fan who coincidentally shares his face, and who eventually comes to hate him.

Throughout the series, Jean-Claude's fragile ego is a running gag, as even while undercover he cannot help but reference his own films repeatedly and is constantly disappointed when people fail to recognize him. Another running gag is that Jean-Claude constantly finds himself in situations from his movies others think are unrealistic, such as being surrounded by enemies who insist on attacking him one at a time or seemingly meeting a version of himself from the future.

== Cast and characters ==
=== Main ===
- Jean-Claude Van Damme as Johnson / Himself / Filip
- Kat Foster as Vanessa
- Moisés Arias as Luis
- Phylicia Rashad as Jane

=== Recurring ===
- Tim Peper as Gunnar
- Ian Fisher as Andrei
- Carlo Rota as Dragan
- Deren Tadlock as Victor
- Winston James Francis as Meni Mano
- Richard Schiff as Alan Morris

== Episodes ==
No.	Title	Directed by	Written by	Original release date
1	"Pilot"	Peter Atencio	David Callaham	August 19, 2016
Retired actor/international spy Jean-Claude Van Damme comes out of retirement to romantically pursue his former hairdresser/right-hand woman Vanessa. Despite his lingering self-doubt, JCVD quickly rediscovers his comfort zone both on set and in the field... for a day, at least. Then he messes everything up.
2	"What Year Do You Think This Is?"	Peter Atencio	David Callaham	December 15, 2017
After Vanessa expresses her displeasure with his botched assignment, JCVD redoubles his efforts to complete the job, infiltrating a local street race... where he messes everything up. Again. Lucky for him, Vanessa has discovered that drugs are just the tip of the iceberg, and she's going to need all the help she can get... even if it's JCVD's.
3	"A Little Conversation About Trust"	Peter Atencio	Ashley Wigfield	December 15, 2017
Filip never asked for much. Just a good group of work friends – which he had – until his life was for some reason turned upside down by legendary actor Jean-Claude Van Damme. Luckily, a group of mercenaries is just around the corner, about to offer Filip the chance to exact his revenge.
4	"If You're Lucky"	Peter Atencio	Wes Tooke	December 15, 2017
JCVD explores whether the time is a flat circle or more of a tetrahedron. Filip becomes trapped in a nightmare of his own making. Vanessa confronts the pain of her past, and Luis stares into the bleak wasteland of his soul.
5	"Run to Nowhere"	Peter Atencio	Vinnie Wilhelm	December 15, 2017
Having destroyed what was left of his career and alienated everyone he cares about, JCVD retreats to his hometown to lick his wounds. But you can never really go home again – and some wounds are hard to reach with your tongue.
6	"The World Needs Its Hero"	Peter Atencio	Kevin Costello	December 15, 2017
JCVD journeys to a forgotten land where he must face a series of trials wrought from the psychic clay of his deepest fears. Also he rents some movies.

== Production ==
The pilot episode for the series debuted on August 19, 2016. The concept was officially picked up on September 27, 2016, but was cancelled after one season.

== Reception ==
On review aggregator website Rotten Tomatoes, the series has an approval rating of 70% based on 33 reviews, with an average rating of 6.60/10.
