= Jill Vialet =

American businessman

- Education: Harvard University
- Occupation: Social entrepreneur
- Known for: Founder of Playworks

Jill Vialet is a social entrepreneur and the founder of Playworks (formerly Sports4Kids). Vialet founded Playworks in 1996 at two schools in Berkeley, California. The organization is now providing play and physical activities in schools in more than 20 cities across the United States. By 2015, Playworks will serve more than 650 schools in 27 cities.

== Personal life ==
She grew up in Washington, D.C. spending her afternoons playing at a local recreation center. She later attended Harvard University and graduated in 1986.

Vialet also founded the Museum of Children's Arts (mocha) in Oakland, California. According to her biography on the Huffington Post, Vialet served as the executive director at mocha for nine years and helped it to expand its programs to reach 20,000 young people each year. In 2011, mocha served approximately 30,000 children.

== Recognition ==
Vialet was elected as an Ashoka Fellow in 2004 for her work in learning/education.

In 2011, Vialet was named by Forbes as one of 30 social entrepreneurs on its 'Impact 30' list. Forbes says it defined the social entrepreneurs on its list as "a person who uses business to solve social issues."

In 2013, Vialet received a James Irvine Foundation Leadership Award.
