= Richard LaBrie =

American filmmaker

Richard LaBrie is an American clinical psychologist and Emmy-nominated editor, director, producer, and writer.

== Early life and education ==
LaBrie received his doctorate in clinical psychology (Psy.D.) from The California School of Professional Psychology at Alliant International University in 2015. He graduated from the Tisch School of the Arts at New York University in 1983.

== Career ==
=== Psychologist ===
LaBrie works primarily as a clinical psychologist in private practice in Pasadena, CA.

=== Editor ===
LaBrie formerly worked primarily as an editor. His editing credits include television shows such as Mad TV, Woke Up Dead, Workaholics, and Key and Peele.

==== Emmy Nomination ====
In 2015, for his work editing Comedy Central's Key and Peele, LaBrie earned his first Emmy nomination. He was nominated again for editing Comedy Central's Key and Peele in 2016.

=== Director ===
LaBrie has directed two feature-length films - Good Luck starring Vincent D'Onofrio, and Joe's Rotten World.

== Awards and nominations ==
Year	Award	Category	Nominee(s)	Result
2015	67th Primetime Emmy Awards	Outstanding Picture Editing for Variety Programming	Richard LaBrie, Christian Hoffman, Phil Davis	Nominated
2016	68th Primetime Emmy Awards	Outstanding Picture Editing for Variety Programming	Richard LaBrie, Neil Mahoney, Nicholas Monsour, Stephen Waichulis	Nominated
