= Peter Atencio =

American television and film director

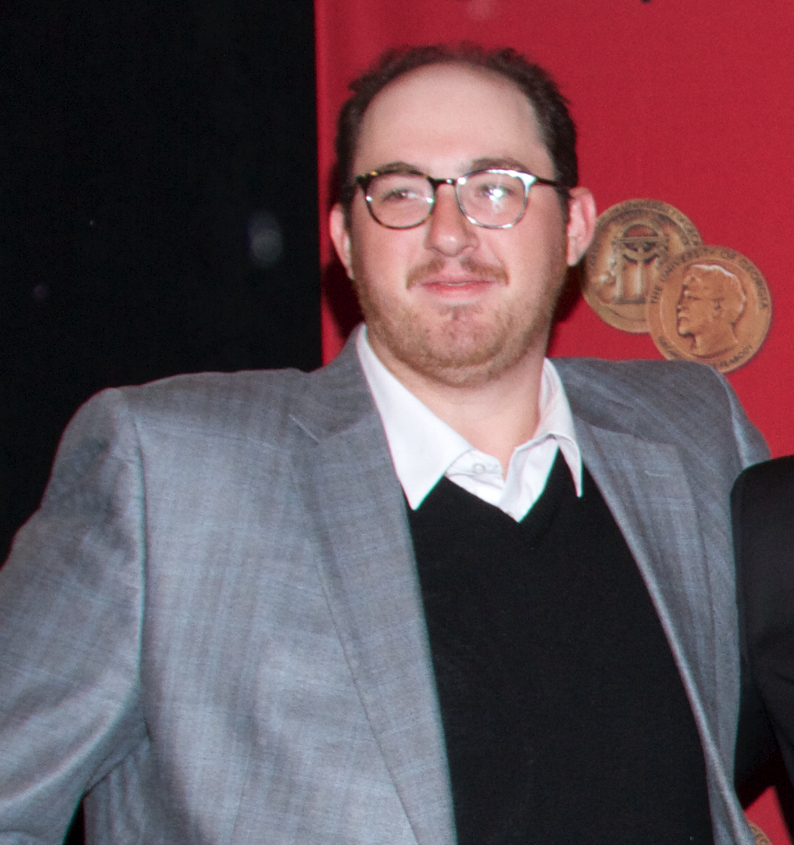
- Atencio in 2014
- Born: March 15, 1983 (age 43); Denver, Colorado, U.S.
- Occupations: TV and film director
- Known for: Key & Peele, Keanu

Peter Atencio (born March 15, 1983) is an American television and film director best known for directing the sketch comedy series Key & Peele, as well as the duo's feature film Keanu, released in 2016. For Key & Peele, Atencio received a Primetime Emmy Award.

== Career ==
Atencio directed all episodes of the sketch comedy series Key & Peele, starring Keegan-Michael Key and Jordan Peele, which aired on Comedy Central.

In 2016, Atencio directed the action-comedy film Keanu, starring Key and Peele, which was released in the U.S. by Warner Bros. on April 29.

In 2017, Atencio directed the action-comedy series Jean-Claude Van Johnson starring Jean-Claude Van Damme, which was released in the U.S. by Amazon Studios on December 15, 2017.

On April 14, 2021, it was announced that Atencio would direct the comedy film The Machine, based on Bert Kreischer's life and career, who is also attached as star, for Legendary Entertainment.

== Filmography ==
- The Rig (2010)
- Keanu (2016)
- The Machine (2023)
- Animal Friends (2027)

== Television ==
- Key & Peele (2012–2015)
- Comedy Central's All-Star Non-Denominational Christmas Special (2014)
- The Last Man on Earth (2014–2015)
- Jean-Claude Van Johnson (2016–2017)
- Making History (2017)
- Whiskey Cavalier (2019)
- The Twilight Zone (2020)
- The Afterparty (2023)
