= Party motivator =

Person paid to entertain party guests

A party motivator is a person paid to entertain attendants at a party. Typically, party motivators are attractive young men and women who dress fashionably and attempt to engage guests in socializing and dancing. Hiring party motivators is primarily a phenomenon within the American upper middle and upper classes; they are especially common at bar and bat mitzvahs.

== See also ==
- Bargirl
