= Playworks =

Active infrastructure company in America

- Founded: 1996
- Founder: Jill Vialet
- Type: Non-profit
- Purpose: Recess in schools, healthy kids, early learning, school safety
- Location: Oakland, CA
- Website: http://www.playworks.org
- Formerly called: Sports4Kids

Playworks is an Oakland-based national nonprofit that supports learning and physical health by providing safe and inviting play to kids. Playworks works with schools to design curriculum and activities that offer play opportunities during recess, lunch and after school programs. Trained coaches work in schools to run a variety of games and sports, as well as teach techniques in skill development, group management, and conflict resolution.

== History ==
Founder and former president Jill Vialet, who co-founded the Museum of Children’s Art (MOCHA) in Oakland, founded Sports4Kids in 1996, which would change its name to Playworks in 2009.

Playworks initially worked at two schools in Berkeley, California in 1996.

In 2004, Playworks was awarded its first AmeriCorps contract. Since 2004, the organization has recruited recess coaches from AmeriCorps. Coaches introduce games into the playground that are welcoming to everybody while teaching teamwork, conflict mediation, leadership skills and social skills. The Playworks playbook of games includes over 250 games, including 37 variations of tag.

Vialet was elected into the Ashoka fellowship in 2004 for her social entrepreneurial work with Playworks. In 2007, Ashoka Changemakers honored Playworks as a winner of its “Sports for a Better World” competition.

In 2008, the Robert Wood Johnson Foundation announced a $18.7 million grant for Playworks for July 2008 to June 2012 in order to expand to 27 cities by 2012.

In 2009, Vialet and Playworks were selected as a member of the Clinton Global Initiative.

In 2011, chief strategy officer, Elizabeth Cushing, was named president and chief operating officer.

== Model ==
Playworks coaches work on-site full-time during recess and after school activities, teaching social skills, problem-solving and conflict resolution. Playworks also provides training programs teach educators and school staff how to incorporate healthy play during school recesses.

The Robert Wood Johnson Foundation states, “Expansion of this program to schools in poor urban neighborhoods across the nation is intended to transcend the social factors - poverty, increased rates of obesity, poor nutrition, neglect, and violence - and provide a pathway to positive health and well-being outcomes for America's low-income children.”

=== Junior Coach Program ===
At some schools, Playworks offers the Junior Coach program, where children can be the coach's assistant by leading games. They receive training sometimes. Two examples are Boston Public Schools and Orchard Elementary School District.

== Corporate Recess ==
Playworks' Corporate Recess initiates a play break for adults and also serves as an employee engagement model that offers team building and community service opportunities.

In April 2010, Playworks DC led the Ashoka Global office in an hour recess. The teams played games common to those played at elementary schools, including Rock paper scissors. The recess for Ashoka evolved into an hour of recess per month.

Playworks also hosts fundraiser Corporate Kickball tournaments, where employees from supporting corporations compete in recess play activities and fundraise for the organization. In June 2011, the Portland, Ore. Corporate Kickball tournament brought representatives from Nike, Kohl's and Kaiser Permanente, raising $14,000 to support 6,000 children in 14 low-income schools.

== Sites ==
Playworks currently serves schools nationwide with local programming available across the country.

== Evaluation ==
During the 2009–2010 school year, Stanford University’s John W. Gardner Center for Youth and their Communities conducted an implementation study of Playworks in San Francisco Bay Area schools. This study found that Playworks created opportunities for student belonging (82 percent of teachers thought that student inclusion in groups improved). This same study evaluated the effectiveness of involving junior coaches during play time, and found that 77 percent of teachers strongly agreed that junior coaches gained leadership skills by participating in the program.

In Massachusetts, Playworks has been identified as a school bullying prevention program following a 2010 national call for action by the U.S. Department of Education. In Boston schools where Playworks is operated, almost 90 percent of teachers reported a decrease in bullying. In a Bay Area study, 76 percent of teachers believed that students felt more physically safe at school as a result of Playworks.

In an April 2011 New York Times article, one Colorado principal reported that Playworks led to a significant drop in playground injuries, from 242 one year to 51 the next. In the same year span, disciplinary incidents requiring office referrals dropped from 40 to 10.

Good Morning America featured a D.C. school where Playworks operates, citing statistics that 15 minutes of recess leads to better performance in class. Two-thirds of principals reported better listening and increased focus after recess.

WebMD reports on CBS News that "In the Sports4Kids program, trained adults foster fun, healthy activities during recess at low-income schools. The grown-ups teach games to the kids and help them learn to handle conflicts without fighting."

A case study of Sports4Kids by the Harvard Family Research Project found that Sports4Kids’ recess and other programs saw visible improvement in several key areas of youth development.

During the 2011 summer, Playworks displayed a 15-second digital ad in New York City’s Times Square, announcing “Recess is another word for the recommended daily allowance of Play.”

Research by the Department of Pediatrics at the University of California, San Francisco compared physical and emotional health outcomes between students in schools that participated Playworks, and a control group. The research showed that children who spent some time outside the classroom during the school day in programs like Playworks' do better in class academically, socially and emotionally.

== National Partnerships ==
In March 2011, Playworks teamed up with the Salesforce.com Foundation, using its Salesforce CRM and Force.com enterprise cloud computing software for donor and contact management. Playworks also benefited from the Foundation’s 1/1/1 model, where 1 percent of its product is donated and discounted; for 1 percent of the time, Salesforce employees become active volunteers; and as 1 percent equity, Playworks has been a recipient of grants from the Foundation.

In addition to becoming a technological partner, Salesforce became a hands-on partner when 25 employees came together at the Dreamforce 2010 conference to build 65 bikes to donate to youth at two local public schools in San Francisco.

In August 2011, Playworks became part of First Lady Michelle Obama’s Let's Move initiative.

On November 29, 2011, Mattel announced a national partnership with Playworks to "ensure underprivileged children have the access, tools and ability to enjoy the benefits of play." Over a two-year period, Mattel will give more than $1 million from the Mattel Children's Foundation to Playworks.

From September 12-14th, 2014 the Southern California region of Playworks partnered with Forge 54 to create the Playworks Playbook mobile application.
