= Key & Peele =

American sketch comedy series (2012–2015)

- Genre: Sketch comedy
- Created by: Keegan-Michael Key; Jordan Peele
- Written by: Rebecca Drysdale; Alex Rubens; Charlie Sanders; Phil Jackson; Rich Talarico; Colton Dunn; Jordan Peele; Keegan-Michael Key; Jay Martel; Ian Roberts; Sean Conroy
- Directed by: Peter Atencio
- Starring: Keegan-Michael Key; Jordan Peele
- Theme music composer: Reggie Watts
- Country of origin: United States
- Original language: English
- No. of seasons: 5
- No. of episodes: 53 + 1 special (list of episodes)

Production
- Executive producers: Keegan-Michael Key; Jordan Peele; Ian Roberts; Jay Martel; Peter Principato; Paul Young
- Producer: Keith Raskin
- Cinematography: Charles Papert
- Editors: Justin Donaldson; Richard LaBrie
- Camera setup: Single-camera (Note: Multi-camera for stage segments)
- Running time: 21–24 minutes
- Production companies: Cindylou; Monkeypaw Productions; Comedy Partners; Martel & Roberts Productions; Principato-Young Entertainment

Original release
- Network: Comedy Central
- Release: January 31, 2012 – September 9, 2015

Related
- Mad TV

Key & Peele (abbreviated to K&P) is an American sketch comedy television series that ran from 2012 to 2015. It was created by Keegan-Michael Key and Jordan Peele for Comedy Central; both had previously worked on Mad TV.

Each episode of the show consists mainly of several pre-taped skits starring the two actors, performing as a double act. The sketches cover a variety of societal topics, often with a focus on American popular culture, ethnic stereotypes, social awkwardness, and race relations. Key & Peele premiered on January 31, 2012 and ended on September 9, 2015, with a total of 53 episodes, over the course of five seasons. A special titled "Key & Peele's Super Bowl Special" aired on January 30, 2015.

Key & Peele won a Peabody Award and two Primetime Emmy Awards and has been nominated for various other awards, including Writers Guild Award, NAACP Image Award and 16 additional Primetime Emmy Awards in various categories. Comedy Central maintains a YouTube channel for the series, which has over 7.44 million subscribers and 3 billion views as of September 2026.

== Format ==
In the first three seasons, an episode would consist of a cold open, with a short sketch. After the intro plays, the two hosts introduce themselves to a studio audience and explain a possible situation, with the following sketch having a tangentially similar situation. The show then follows this pattern, with a number of sketches, each varying in length. However, not all the segments are introduced by a studio segment nor are they necessarily on a similar or connected theme. Many of the show's sketches follow a similar comedic form, specifically taking a comedic premise, situation, or turn of phrase, and repeat it in a more extreme fashion, thereby 'upping the ante' of comedic absurdity as the sketch unfolds. As an example, in popular sketch "Consequences", a guest speaker is brought to a school assembly to warn students about the consequences of their youthful misadventures. The speaker starts by telling a story of pattern of youthful misbehaviors and minor substance-use, such as smoking cigarettes and "hanging out on the street late at night" leading to misdemeanors and petty crime, through to "real crimes" which resulted in "being shot out of a catapult into the mouth of a dragon", and later being "sucked into a wormhole, consequences!". Additionally, Key and Peele's sketches often poke fun at aspects of race relations in the modern-day United States, as well as Black American culture writ large.

In the last two seasons, the show eschewed a studio audience in favor of a pre-shot narrative, featuring the duo discussing a concept during a car ride through the Mojave Desert, as the introduction to their sketches. In the last episode, it is revealed that the car ride is an extension of the "I Said Bitch" sketch from the first episode, their first primary sketch, as they finally stop the car in the middle of the road, look around, and utter "Bitch!" to one another.

== Production ==
The series was first announced in June 2011 by Comedy Central. In anticipation of the show, Key and Peele launched a web series in support of the program. The series premiered in January 2012 on Comedy Central in the U.S. and on The Comedy Network in Canada. The first episode drew 2.1 million viewers, making it the most-watched Comedy Central launch since 2009.

The series was renewed for four more seasons, beginning in September 2012, September 2013, September 2014, and July 2015. The last episode aired in September 2015.

== Episodes ==
Season	Episodes	Originally released	
Season	Episodes	First released	Last released
1	8	January 31, 2012	March 20, 2012
2	10	September 26, 2012	November 28, 2012
3	13	September 18, 2013	December 18, 2013
4	11	September 24, 2014	December 10, 2014
Special		January 30, 2015	
5	11	July 8, 2015	September 9, 2015

== Recurring characters and sketches ==
=== Barack Obama and Luther ===
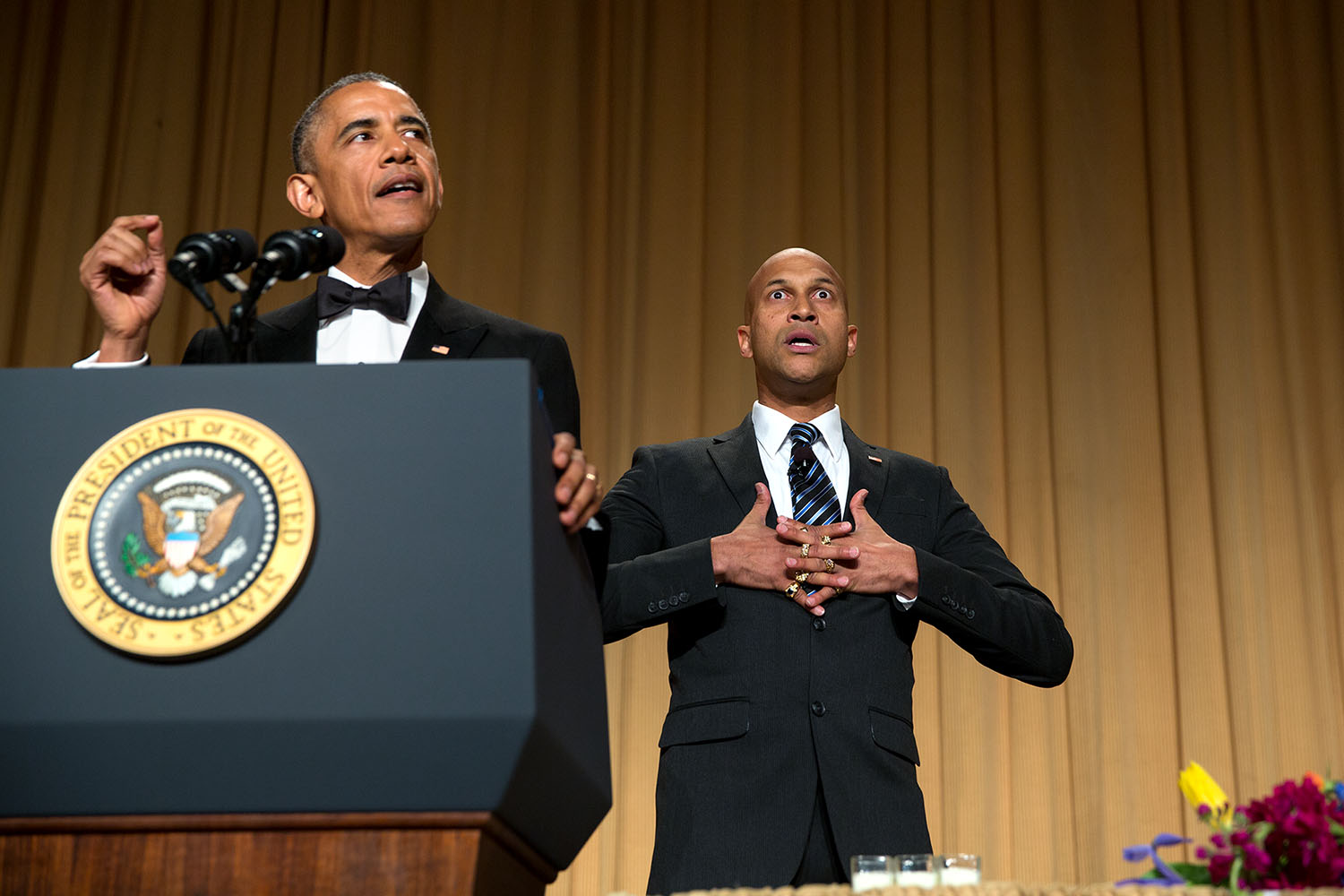
Key performing as Luther, President Obama's "anger translator", alongside the real Obama at the 2015 White House Correspondents Dinner.

The 44th President of the United States, impersonated by Peele, often has difficulty expressing his true feelings. President Barack Obama's "anger translator" Luther, played by Key, works to interpret the President's low-key statements into raging, profanity-laced tirades. Oftentimes, Luther goes too far with these and has to be reeled in by Obama, while other times Luther's influence ends up rubbing on Obama, prompting him to swear. Other sketches reveal that Obama's wife and two daughters each have their own anger translators as well, whom they request help from to speak with each other, as do other politicians such as Hillary Clinton.

Key appeared briefly in-character as Luther at the Annual White House Correspondents Dinner as an anger translator for the real Barack Obama in early 2015. On January 5, 2017, Key debuted an "Obama-Luther" sketch on The Daily Show with Trevor Noah.

In 2024, a sketch from Key & Peele gained public attention when the real Barack Obama was filmed at USA Basketball’s 50th anniversary party in Las Vegas acting in a similar manner to Peele's Obama in one of the sketches. At the USA Basketball party, Obama was filmed shaking the hands of white athletes but giving hugs to black athletes. This was noted as similar to a 2014 Key & Peele sketch where Peele's Obama is shown at a political event where he greets white guests by shaking their hands but greets black guests by hugging them.

=== Mr. Garvey ===
Mr. Garvey (played by Key) is an ill-tempered and distrustful substitute teacher with 20 years of experience in inner-city schools, which he applies to his now mostly white suburban class. While taking attendance, Mr. Garvey proceeds to butcher the names of his students, rendering Jacqueline as "Jay-Quellin", Blake as "Balakay", Denise as "Dee-Nice", and Aaron as "A-A-Ron". The implication is that Mr. Garvey has trouble pronouncing "white" names, mirroring the experiences of minority students with similar-minded white teachers. However, when the students correct him, Mr. Garvey thinks they're deliberately messing with him, and refuses to accept their word. Instead, he vigorously defends his errors, causing him to become progressively more enraged and threatening with each correction. He proclaims that he has his eye on Jacqueline, asks Blake if he wants to go to war, and breaks a clipboard in front of Denise while demanding she say her name "right". Mr. Garvey eventually snaps at Aaron, sending him to Principal O'Shaughnessy's office—whose name he mispronounces as "O'Shag-Hennessy"—for insubordination. The only student Mr. Garvey seems to trust is an African-American boy at the back of the class named Timothy ("Tim-Oh-Thee"), who is played by Peele. Timothy does not correct Mr. Garvey when his name is called, and also replies with "pree-sent" instead of "present", suggesting he may come from a similar background to Mr. Garvey.

In Substitute Teacher Part 2, Mr. Garvey's class—including a new student named Jessica ("Je-Seeca")—seem to have gotten used to their names being mangled. During roll call, Aaron informs Mr. Garvey that some students need to leave class early, so that they can meet up with their clubs for yearbook photos. Mr. Garvey misinterprets this as a fabricated excuse to ditch class and go clubbing, something his students are too young for. Jacqueline nonetheless confirms that Aaron was referring to the students' school clubs, but Mr. Garvey simply takes this as confirmation that, yet again, the students are messing with him. In this mindset, Mr. Garvey questions his students about their club activities, then finds a reason as to why they must be lying. Jacqueline's involvement in Future Leaders of America is dismissed due to her not being clairvoyant; Blake being in the Spanish club is ridiculed on the grounds that he's "as Spanish as Rhian Seacrest"; and Denise saying she's in the chess club is misinterpreted as being in the "chest club", which Mr. Garvey hurtfully claims she isn't. When Mr. Garvey learns that Aaron is the president of the glee club, he loses his temper; he refuses to believe that such a club exists, as, in his mind, no one would ever dedicate a club to a TV show (never considering that it might be the other way around). Once again, Mr. Garvey sends Aaron to Principal O'Shaughnessy's office out of rage and spite. Immediately afterwards, O'Shaughnessy himself makes an intercom announcement to remind students to meet with their clubs, but Mr. Garvey dismisses it as fake (possibly because O'Shaughnessy said his name correctly, rather than "O'Shag-Hennessy"). Despite all of this, Mr. Garvey is happy to excuse Timothy so he can pick up his daughter, as he deems this a "valid reason" for leaving early.

In November 2022, Key reprised the role in an advertisement for Paramount+, in which he teaches a mountaineering class consisting of various children's show characters. These students include "Blah-Zay" (Blaze from Blaze and the Monster Machines), "B-Louie" (Blue from Blue's Clues), Peppa Pig (whose name is not called), "Big Naughty" (Nate from Big Nate), "K-Room" (Krumm from Aaahh!!! Real Monsters), "Doh-Rah" (Dora the Explorer), and "Bum-blee-bay" (Bumblebee). Unlike the original sketches, "A-A-Ron" (Aaron Donald) plays the Timothy role, and is not sent to the principal's office.

=== The Valets ===
Played by Key and Peele, the two valets from the Berkshire Restaurant (who always use unnecessary plurals in names of people, places, or things) love discussing their favorite movie stars and characters. Despite this, the valets mangle their names and films – such as "Liam Neesons" from Tooken, "Peter Dinkels" (who plays "Taiwan Lannister"), "Bruce Willies," "Michelle Pa-feiffers," "Timothy Elephants" and "Racist-Ass Melly Gibsons". They end the sketch by saying that something related to the star in question is "MY SHIT!", then disappearing, by ways such as flying into the air like a rocket or exploding.

In February 2014, a sponsored sketch with the valets titled "What About Non-Stop?" – in which "Liam Neesons" himself shows up to collect his car – was used to promote the film Non-Stop.

Key and Peele also appeared in a parody of "The Valets" in one of the teaser trailers for Toy Story 4.

=== East/West Bowl football players ===
The East/West Bowl features college football stars whose names become increasingly ridiculous. The concept came from Peele discovering there was an actual player with the name of D'Brickashaw Ferguson while playing Madden NFL. The sketch utilizes introductions such as those on NBC Sunday Night Football in which the player states their name and school. Most are played by either Key or Peele, including "Javaris Jamar Javarison-Lamar" of the University of Middle Tennessee, "Hingle McCringleberry" of Pennsylvania State University, "Donkey Teeth" of Boise State University, "Huka'lakanaka Hakanakaheekalucka'hukahakafaka" of the University of Hawaii, "Squeeeeeeeps" of Santa Monica College, and "Firstname Lastname" of "College University". In addition, some West Team players come from non-university organizations, such as "Torque (Construction Noise) Lewith" of "Nevada State Penitentiary", "Morse Code" of "Army/Navy Surplus Store", "Wingdings" of "Online Classes", and the home-schooled "God". The West Team's introductions are always finalized by a white player with a conventional name played by neither Key or Peele - with the two being "Dan Smith" of Brigham Young University and "A. A. Ron Balakay" (Note: "'A. A. Ron Balakay'" possibly serves as the inspiration for the students' names in their previously mentioned sketch, Substitute Teacher. This sketch came out on January 31, 2012, while the Substitute Teacher sketch was aired later that year on October 17, 2012.) (a mispronunciation on Aaron Blake) of Morehouse College.

In the third edition of this sketch, the fictional athletes were joined by actual players with unusual names, such as Ha Ha Clinton-Dix, Ishmaa'ily Kitchen, and Ferguson himself. The last West Team player was "A. A. Ron Rodgers", with his name modified, in reference to the Mr. Garvey sketches. According to Key, Rodgers improvised his own punchline.

== Guest stars ==
- Tatyana Ali
- Utkarsh Ambudkar
- K. D. Aubert
- Leslie David Baker
- Sarah Baker
- Malcolm Barrett
- Bonnie Bartlett
- Tone Bell
- Matt Besser
- Jordan Black
- Wayne Brady
- Paget Brewster
- Bo Burnham
- Ty Burrell
- Kate Burton
- Michelle Buteau
- Anna Camp
- Heather Anne Campbell
- Larry Joe Campbell
- Eugene Cordero
- Mekia Cox
- Rob Delaney
- Julia Duffy
- EpicLLOYD
- Neil Flynn
- Daniele Gaither
- David Giuntoli
- Fiona Gubelmann
- Regina Hall
- Colin Hanks
- Ryan Hansen
- Tricia Helfer
- Justin Hires
- Meagan Holder
- James Hong
- Anna Maria Horsford
- Clint Howard
- Ernie Hudson
- Rob Huebel
- Gabriel Iglesias
- Nicole Randall Johnson
- Matt Jones
- Rashida Jones
- King Bach
- Art LaFleur
- Lauren Lapkus
- Natasha Leggero
- Tiny Lister
- Kristanna Loken
- Melanie Lynskey
- Hayes MacArthur
- Romany Malco
- Ken Marino
- Alphonso McAuley
- Jack McBrayer
- Kate Micucci
- Jerry Minor
- Mark Moses
- Arden Myrin
- Danielle Nicolet
- Dean Norris
- Adam Pally
- Keke Palmer
- Metta World Peace
- Mekhi Phifer
- Lance Reddick
- Retta
- Kim Rhodes
- Rob Riggle
- Jason Ritter
- Charlie Robinson
- Rebecca Romijn
- Andre Royo
- Will Sasso
- Richard Schiff
- Jason Schwartzman
- Brenda Song
- Kevin Sorbo
- Paul F. Tompkins
- Janet Varney
- Malcolm-Jamal Warner
- Michaela Watkins
- Vernee Watson
- Alie Ward
- Stephnie Weir
- Billy Dee Williams
- Gary Anthony Williams
- Tyler James Williams
- Cedric Yarbrough
- Carlson Young

== Reception ==
=== Critical reception ===
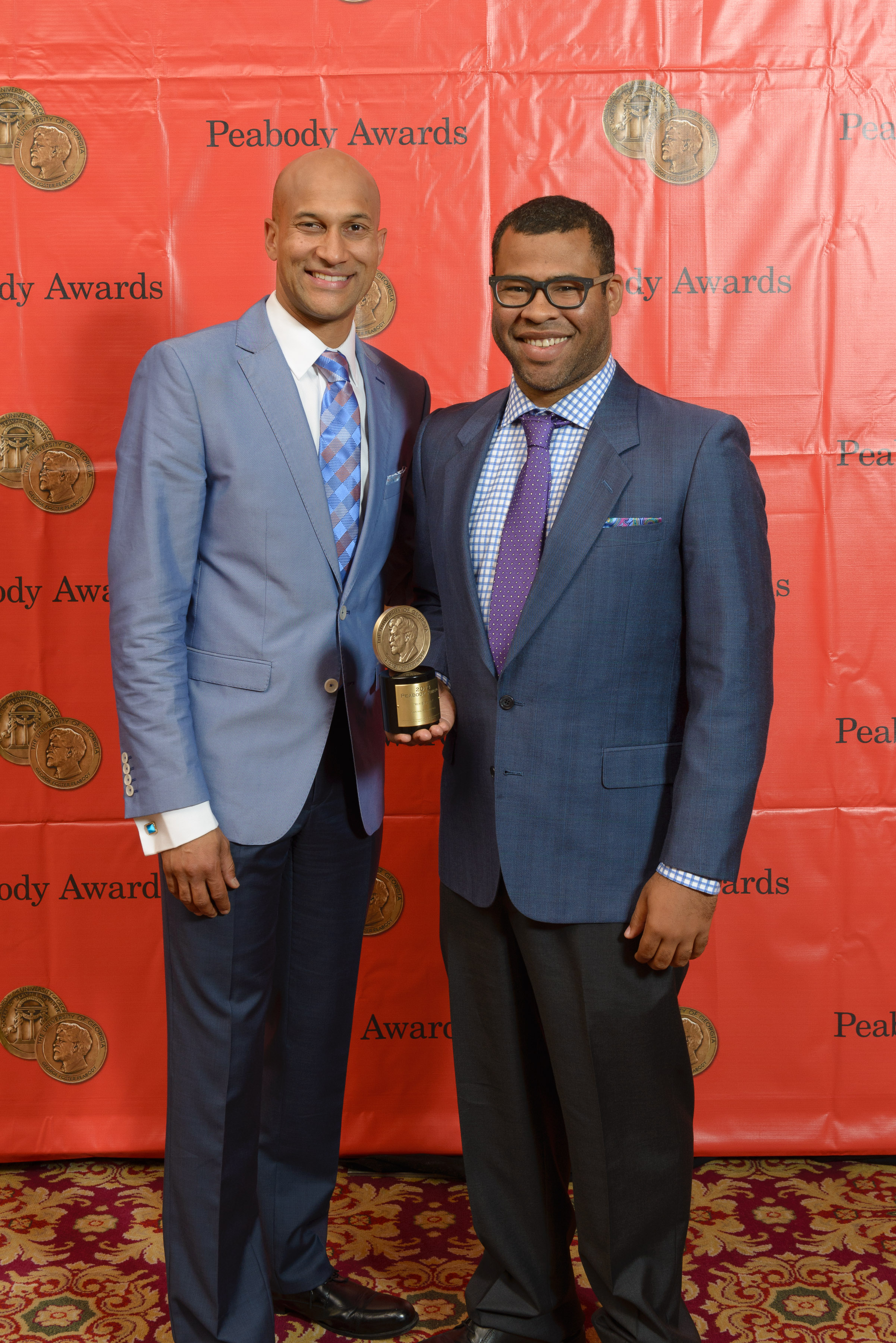
Key and Peele attending the 2014 Peabody Awards

The first two seasons of Key & Peele received positive reviews, maintaining a score 74 of 100 by the review aggregator site Metacritic. The third season of Key & Peele received critical acclaim, receiving a score of 82 on Metacritic. The series won a Peabody Award in 2013 "for its stars and their creative team's inspired satirical riffs on our racially divided and racially conjoined culture". On April 24, 2012, during an interview on Late Night with Jimmy Fallon, President Barack Obama told the story of how he had watched the Key & Peele sketch featuring himself with "Luther, his Anger Translator", saying that "It's pretty good stuff – it's good stuff." Additionally, on April 25, 2015, during the White House Correspondents Dinner, Key reprised the role of Luther, President Obama's anger translator during the event. Dave Chappelle has accused the show of copying the format he established years prior for Chappelle's Show, but states that he is still a fan of the show.

=== Awards and nominations ===
Year	Association	Category	Nominee(s)	Result
2013	Writers Guild of America Awards	Comedy/Variety (Including Talk) Series	Rebecca Drysdale, Colton Dunn, Keegan-Michael Key, Jay Martel, Jordan Peele, Ian Roberts, Alex Rubens, Charlie Sanders, and Rich Talarico	Nominated
2013	65th Primetime Emmy Awards	Outstanding Makeup for a Multi-Camera Series or Special (Non-Prosthetic)	Scott Wheeler, Suzanne Diaz	Nominated
2014	Peabody Award	Entertainment honoree	Key & Peele	Won
2014	66th Primetime Emmy Awards	Outstanding Original Music and Lyrics	Episode: "Substitute Teacher #3; Joshua Funk, Rebecca Drysdale for "Les Mis"	Nominated
2014	66th Primetime Emmy Awards	Outstanding Writing for a Variety Series	Jay Martel, Ian Roberts, Jordan Peele, Keegan-Michael Key, Alex Rubens, Rebecca Drysdale, Colton Dunn, Rich Talarico, Charlie Sanders	Nominated
2014	66th Primetime Emmy Awards	Outstanding Makeup for a Multi-Camera Series or Special (Non-Prosthetic)	Episode: "East/West Bowl Rap	Nominated
2014	66th Primetime Emmy Awards	Outstanding Hairstyling for a Multi-Camera Series or Special	Episode: "Substitute Teacher #3"	Nominated
2015	People's Choice Awards	Favorite Sketch Comedy Series	Comedy Central	Nominated
2015	67th Primetime Emmy Awards	Outstanding Variety Sketch Series	Comedy Central	Nominated
2015	67th Primetime Emmy Awards	Outstanding Supporting Actor in a Comedy Series	Keegan-Michael Key	Nominated
2015	67th Primetime Emmy Awards	Outstanding Writing for a Variety Series	Rebecca Drysdale, Colton Dunn, Keegan-Michael Key, Jay Martel, Jordan Peele, Ian Roberts, Alex Rubens, Charlie Sanders, and Rich Talarico	Nominated
2015	67th Primetime Emmy Awards	Outstanding Writing for a Variety Special	Brendan Hunt, Keegan-Michael Key, Jordan Peele, and Rich Talarico for Key & Peele's Super Bowl Special	Nominated
2015	67th Primetime Emmy Awards	Outstanding Picture Editing for Variety Programming	Phil Davis, Christian Hoffman, and Rich LaBrie (Segment: "Scariest Movie Ever")	Nominated
2015	67th Primetime Emmy Awards	Outstanding Hairstyling for a Multi-Camera Series or Special	Episode: "Aerobics Meltdown"	Nominated
2015	67th Primetime Emmy Awards	Outstanding Makeup for a Multi-Camera Series or Special (Non-Prosthetic)	Episode: "Episode 406"	Nominated
2015	67th Primetime Emmy Awards	Outstanding Short-Format Live-Action Entertainment Program	Key & Peele Presents Van and Mike: The Ascension	Nominated
2016	68th Primetime Emmy Awards	Outstanding Variety Sketch Series	Comedy Central	Won
2016	68th Primetime Emmy Awards	Outstanding Supporting Actor in a Comedy Series	Keegan-Michael Key	Nominated
2016	68th Primetime Emmy Awards	Outstanding Writing for a Variety Series	Comedy Central	Nominated
2016	68th Primetime Emmy Awards	Outstanding Hairstyling for a Multi-Camera Series or Special	Episode: "Y'all Ready for This?"	Nominated
2016	68th Primetime Emmy Awards	Outstanding Make-up for a Multi-Camera Series or Special (Non-Prosthetic)	Episode: "Y'all Ready for This?"	Won
2016	68th Primetime Emmy Awards	Outstanding Picture Editing for Variety Programming	Rich LaBrie, Neil Mahoney, Nicholas Monsour, and Stephen Waichulis for Episode: "The End"	Nominated
2016	68th Primetime Emmy Awards	Outstanding Production Design for a Variety, Nonfiction, Reality, or Reality-Competition Series	Episodes: "Y'all Ready For This?"; "The End"	Nominated

== Related media ==
=== Vandaveon and Mike ===
Key & Peele have also created a YouTube commentary of their episodes under their alter-egos Vandaveon Huggins and Mike Taylor. Vandaveon and Mike analyze an episode, and suggest that low brow humor would make it funnier. These videos were also added to On Demand offerings of Key & Peele episodes. On March 12, 2014, Comedy Central announced the network was developing an animated spinoff starring Vandaveon and Mike as 12-year-old hall monitors, in association with Key and Peele.

=== Other film and television ===
Key and Peele have appeared as a comedic duo, usually in tribute to the show, in various film and television series. This includes the following:

- In the final three episodes of the first season of Fargo (2014), Key and Peele play wisecracking FBI agents Bill Budge and Webb Pepper, who seek vengeance against main antagonist Lorne Malvo (Billy Bob Thornton) after he takes advantage of their distraction from their conversation to commit a rampage.
- Key and Peele dueled in two episodes of Epic Rap Battles of History. The first involved Mahatma Gandhi (Key) vs. Martin Luther King, Jr. (Peele), while the second involved Muhammad Ali (Peele) vs. Michael Jordan (Key).
- In the film Keanu, Key and Peele play cousins Clarence Goobril and Rell Williams, who infiltrate a gang to retrieve a stolen kitten, as well as Smoke and Oil Dresden, the dreaded Allentown Brothers. Both also served as producers, with Peele contributing to the script.
- In the animated film Toy Story 4, Key and Peele voice carnival toys Ducky and Bunny, who assist Buzz Lightyear throughout the film.
- In the animated film Wendell & Wild, Key and Peele play the titular demons. Peele also co-wrote and co-produced the film.

== Home media ==
On September 25, 2012, Comedy Central and Paramount Home Entertainment released "Key and Peele – Season 1" on DVD and Blu-ray Disc. Both formats feature bloopers, outtakes, a "Poolside Interview," audio commentary with Keegan-Michael Key and Jordan Peele, "Backstage," "Split Their Pants," Key & Peele live at the South Beach Comedy Festival, and an easter egg of the show's theme song.

== Broadcast ==
The show generally aired on international localized versions of Comedy Central. It premiered in Australia on The Comedy Channel on August 9, 2012.
