= Jeffery Austin =

American pop musician

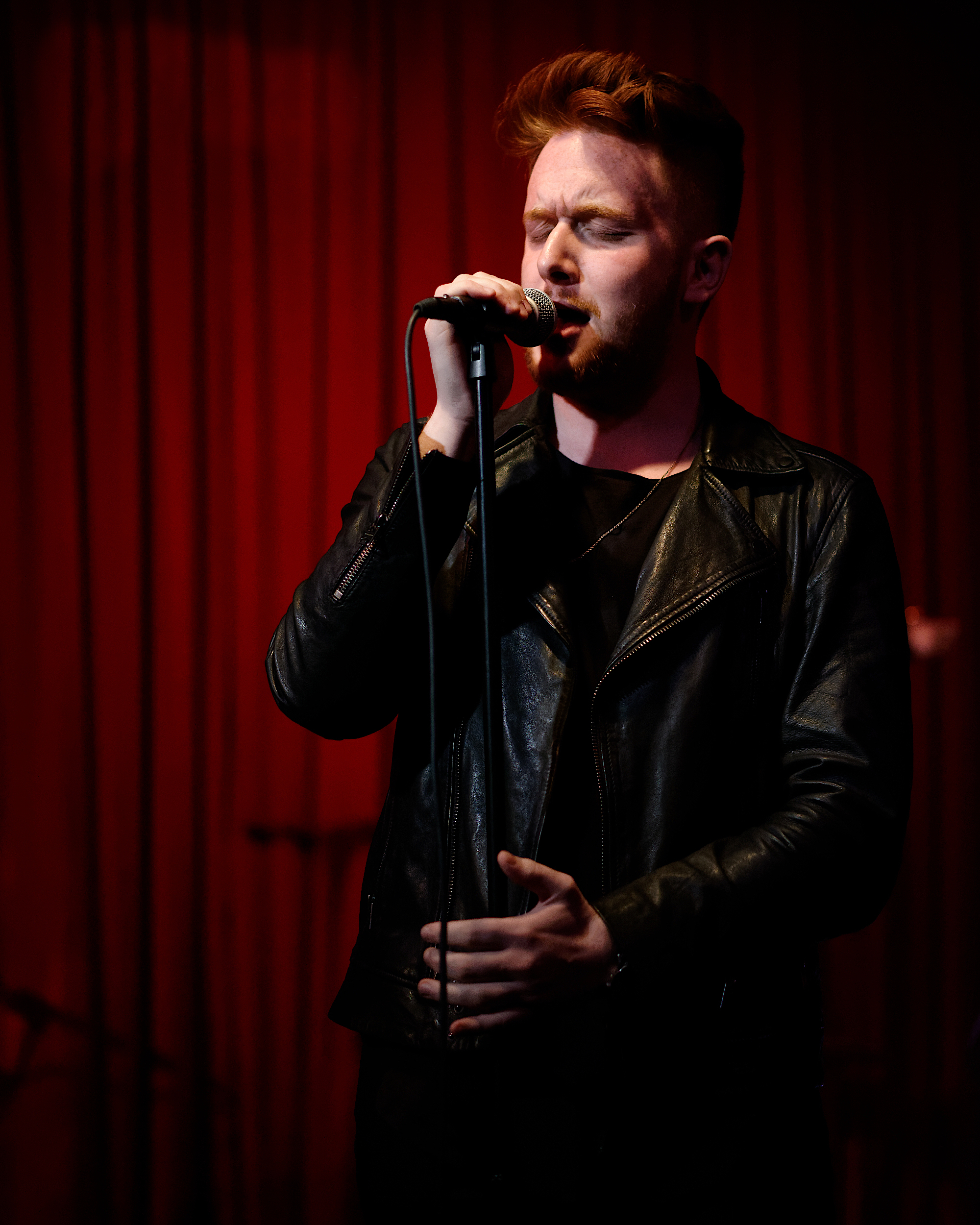
- Jeffery Austin performing in 2016

Background information
- Also known as: Jeffery Austin
- Born: Jeffery Austin McClelland, Jr. April 15, 1991 (age 34); St. Charles, Illinois, U.S.
- Origin: Chicago, Illinois, U.S.
- Genres: Pop, soul
- Occupations: Singer, songwriter
- Instruments: Vocals, piano
- Years active: 2015–present
- Labels: Republic
- Website: jefferyaustin.com

Jeffery Austin McClelland, Jr. (born April 15, 1991), better known by his stage name Jeffery Austin, is an American pop musician and was a contestant on the ninth season of The Voice, turning a single chair and defaulting to be a member of Gwen Stefani's team. He eventually finished in fourth place, behind Jordan Smith, Emily Ann Roberts, and Barrett Baber. His compilation album, The Voice: The Complete Season 9 Collection, placed on the Billboard magazine charts.

== Early life ==
Austin was born Jeffery Austin McClelland, Jr., in St. Charles, Illinois, on April 15, 1991, to Jeffery Sr., and Michele Renee McClelland (née, Brommel), where he was raised with a younger brother, Casey. His parents were married in Austin, Texas on April 25, 1987, and they were married for 13 years before his father's death on July 18, 2000, in New Orleans, Louisiana, when Austin was nine years old. He was a member of the Haines Middle School choir before going on to graduate from St. Charles North High School in 2009. When he was 16, Austin came out as gay to the support of his family. Austin would later graduate from Loyola University Chicago with a Bachelor's degree in 2013, majoring in public relations and advertising. He would then relocate to New York City, where he took a position in the field of public relations, before auditioning for The Voice and moving to Los Angeles.

== Music career ==
=== The Voice ===
Austin appeared on season 9 of NBC's The Voice, in the fall of 2015. His audition turned the chair of Gwen Stefani, earning him a spot on her team. Austin eventually finished the competition in fourth place, behind Jordan Smith, Emily Ann Roberts, and Barrett Baber. His compilation album, The Voice: The Complete Season 9 Collection, placed on the Billboard magazine charts, where it peaked at No. 106 on The Billboard 200.

– Studio version of performance reached the top 10 on iTunes

Stage	Song	Original Artist	Date	Order	Result
Blind Audition	"Lay Me Down"	Sam Smith	September 28, 2015	3.3	Gwen Stefani turned Defaulted to Team Gwen
Battle Rounds (Top 48)	"Can't Feel My Face" (vs. Noah Jackson)	The Weeknd	October 13, 2015	8.5	Saved by Coach
Knockout Rounds (Top 32)	"Turning Tables" (vs. Kota Wade)	Adele	November 2, 2015	13.3	Saved by Coach
Live Playoffs (Top 24)	"Say You Love Me"	Jessie Ware	November 9, 2015	15.7	Saved by Public Vote
Live Top 12	"Let It Go"	James Bay	November 16, 2015	18.8	Saved by Public Vote
Live Top 11	"Dancing on My Own"	Robyn	November 23, 2015	20.11	Saved by Public Vote
Live Top 10	"Jealous"	Labrinth	November 30, 2015	22.1	Saved by Public Vote
Live Semi-finals (Top 9)	"Believe"	Cher	December 7, 2015	24.3	Middle 3
Semi-finals Instant Save	"Make It Rain"	Foy Vance	December 8, 2015	25.3	Saved by Twitter Instant Save
Live Finals (Top 4)	"O Holy Night"	Adolphe Adam	December 14, 2015	26.4	4th place
Live Finals (Top 4)	"Stay"	Sugarland	December 14, 2015	26.8	4th place
Live Finals (Top 4)	"Leather and Lace" (with Gwen Stefani)	Stevie Nicks and Don Henley	December 14, 2015	26.10	4th place

Round	Episode / Order	Collaborators	Song	Original Artist	References
Live Playoffs Results	17.1	Braiden Sunshine, Korin Bukowski, Regina Love, Viktor Király, Ellie Lawrence	"O-o-h Child"	Five Stairsteps	
Live Top 11 Results	21.2	Braiden Sunshine and Korin Bukowski	"You Get What You Give"	New Radicals	
The Finale Results	27.6	Madi Davis	"Tears Dry on Their Own"	Amy Winehouse	
The Finale Results	27.10	Tori Kelly	"Hollow"	Tori Kelly	

== Discography ==
=== Albums ===
Title	Album details	Peak chart positions	Sales
Title	Album details	US	Sales
The Voice: The Complete Season 9 Collection	Released: December 15, 2015; Label: Republic Records; Format: Digital download	106	
