= Something Beautiful (Jordan Smith album) =

Studio album by Jordan Smith
- Released: March 18, 2016
- Genre: Pop; Adult contemporary; Contemporary Christian
- Length: 46:59
- Label: Republic
- Producer: David Foster; Stephan Moccio; Bill Appleberry

Jordan Smith chronology
| The Complete Season 9 Collection (The Voice Performance) (2015) | Something Beautiful (2016) | Tis the Season (2016) |

Singles from Something Beautiful
- 1. "Stand in the Light" Released: February 12, 2016

Something Beautiful is a studio album by American singer and musician Jordan Smith. It is Smith's debut album following his victory that capped season nine of The Voice. The album was released on March 18, 2016, through Republic Records. Something Beautiful debuted on the Billboard 200 at number two, just under the first number one solo album by The Voice coach Gwen Stefani.

== History ==
On December 15, 2015, Jordan Smith was crowned the winner of season nine of The Voice. Three days later, Smith told Entertainment Weekly, "I'm very, very adamant about getting my music out there as quickly as possible and the label is with me in that effort."

Smith announced in February 2016 that he was working on the album with David Foster and Stephan Moccio. The track list for Something Beautiful was announced at the same time as the release of its first single, "Stand in the Light".

Something Beautiful was released on March 18, 2016, and features 12 songs comprising a mix of covers and original material. Two additional tracks are included on the Walmart edition. The album debuted at number two on the iTunes Store album sales list; it took the top spot on March 22. Smith entered the Billboard top 200 albums chart for the week of April 9, 2016, debuting at number two behind This Is What the Truth Feels Like, the first number one debut by The Voice coach Gwen Stefani. Something Beautiful was the highest entry and best sales week ever for any contestant on The Voice, and the top debut for any new artist in 2016 through March. The album has sold 73,000 copies in the United States as of August 2016.

== Singles ==
"Stand in the Light" was released to digital retailers as the lead single on February 12, 2016. The accompanying music video premiered on March 4. The song experienced moderate success, peaking at number 11 on the Billboard Christian Songs chart and at number 25 on the magazine's Adult Contemporary airplay chart.

== Critical reception ==
Professional ratings
Review scores
| Source | Rating |
|---|---|
| AllMusic | 2.5/5 stars |

iTunes' editorial staff praised Smith's "fearless, confident singing, which elevates even the simplest phrases into stirring statements." AllMusic noted Smith's "relentless good cheer. He's just ... happy to be singing," and the listener's enjoyment "depends entirely on how ingratiating you find that starry-eyed optimism." Starpulse wrote, "Smith’s instrument is stronger than Something Beautiful in itself, hence making this debut one that’s satisfying and better than expected".

Jake's Take offered a B+ grade for the connection Smith had with the album's songs, but would prefer that "Jordan and the Republic Records team find high quality original material" for Smith's next effort. The Knoxville News Sentinel gave the album three stars (out of five) for its "entirely too cautious" approach and "safe but beautiful" songs: Smith's take on "You Are So Beautiful" is "embarrassingly sterilized"; his cover of "Beautiful", however, "is the album highlight as he taps into the life-affirming lyrics with touching gentleness." AXS wrote, "Voice fans who purchase the record won't be disappointed ... but it still feels like the real Jordan Smith has yet to stand up."

== Track listing ==
Standard edition
| No. | Title | Writer(s) | Original artist | Length |
|---|---|---|---|---|
| 1. | "Over the Rainbow" | Harold Arlen; Yip Harburg | Judy Garland | 3:43 |
| 2. | "Stand in the Light" | Lauren Christy; Stephan Moccio | | 3:57 |
| 3. | "You Are So Beautiful" | Billy Preston; Bruce Fisher | Billy Preston | 2:22 |
| 4. | "Beautiful" | Linda Perry | Christina Aguilera | 4:34 |
| 5. | "Angel" | Sarah McLachlan | Sarah McLachlan | 4:42 |
| 6. | "And So It Goes" | Billy Joel | Billy Joel | 3:39 |
| 7. | "Amazing Grace" | John Newton | | 4:23 |
| 8. | "I Got to Be Me" | John Ondrasik; Moccio | | 4:19 |
| 9. | "Settle" | James Scott Burnett; Patrick Martin; Bill Appleberry; Jordan Smith | | 3:11 |
| 10. | "What Now" | Antoniou Michael Phillip; Olivia Waithe; Parker Ighile; Nathan Cassells; Robin Fenty; Ife Oladigbalu; Kuk Harrell | Rihanna | 5:01 |
| 11. | "Ain't Got Far to Go" | Janée Bennett; Knox Brown; Finlay Dow–Smith; Jess Glynne | Jess Glynne | 3:00 |
| 12. | "Beautiful Things" | Moccio | | 4:01 |
| Total length: | | | | 46:59 |

Walmart bonus tracks
| No. | Title | Writer(s) | Original artist | Length |
|---|---|---|---|---|
| 13. | "Love Somebody" | Adam Levine; Nathaniel Motte; Ryan Tedder; Noel Zancanella | Maroon 5 | 5:09 |
| 14. | "Dog Days Are Over" | Florence Welch; Isabella Summers | Florence and the Machine | 4:07 |

Christian Book Distributors bonus track
| No. | Title | Writer(s) | Original artist | Length |
|---|---|---|---|---|
| 13. | "No More Night" | Walt Harrah | Glen Campbell |
| 14. | "Every Prayer" (featuring Shelea) |

== Charts ==
| Chart (2016) | Peak position |
|---|---|
| Canadian Albums (Billboard) | 19 |
| US Billboard 200 | 2 |
