= Barrett Baber =

American singer-songwriter

- Born: Barrett Hankins Baber; May 18, 1980 (age 46); Marion, Arkansas
- Origin: Fayetteville, Arkansas
- Genres: Country, rock, alternative country, country rock
- Occupations: Singer, songwriter, guitarist
- Instruments: Vocals, guitar
- Years active: 2004–present
- Website: barrettbaber.com

Barrett Hankins Baber (born May 18, 1980) is an American country musician. He plays alternative country and country rock music. As a contestant on NBC's The Voice, he auditioned and got a four chair turn during season 9, and chose to be a member of team Blake Shelton. His songs have charted on the Billboard magazine charts, during his performances on the show. He finished the competition in third place behind winner Jordan Smith and runner-up Emily Ann Roberts.

== Early and personal life ==
Baber was born, Barrett Hankins Baber, on May 18, 1980, in Arkansas, who considers Marion, Arkansas, his hometown. He is a survivor of American Airlines Flight 1420, which crashed upon landing at Little Rock National Airport on June 1, 1999.

== Music career ==
=== Early music career ===
His music career started in 2004, with his release, Fratbar Superstar, that was released on December 14, 2004. He release the subsequent album, Colt Square Sessions, on April 13, 2012. The third album, Battlefield Us, was released on September 14, 2013. His first extended play, Falling Again, was released on May 8, 2015.

=== 2015: The Voice ===
He appeared on season 9 of NBC's The Voice, in the fall of 2015, with this appearance he got a four chair turn during the auditions, when he chose to be part of Blake Shelton's team on the show. His renditions of "Angel Eyes", "I Drive Your Truck", "Right Here Waiting", "Delta Dawn", and "I'd Love to Lay You Down", all have charted on the Billboard magazine Country Digital Songs charts, where they peaked at Nos. 41, 27, 9, 20, and 1, correspondingly. The songs, "Right Here Waiting", "Delta Dawn", and "I'd Love to Lay You Down", charted on the Billboard Hot Country Songs chart, at Nos. 36, 47, and 16, respectively. The song, "I'd Love to Lay You Down", charted on the Billboard Hot 100 at No. 92, while it also peaked at No. 10 on the Billboard Digital Songs chart.

– Studio version of performance reached the top 10 on iTunes

| Stage | Song | Original Artist | Date | Order | Result |
|---|---|---|---|---|---|
| Blind Audition | "Angel Eyes" | Jeff Healey | September 21, 2015 | 1.11 | All four chairs turned Joined Team Blake |
| Battle Rounds (Top 48) | "Walking in Memphis" (vs. Dustin Christensen) | Marc Cohn | October 12, 2015 | 7.6 | Saved by Coach |
| Knockout Rounds (Top 32) | "Colder Weather" (vs. Blind Joe) | Zac Brown Band | October 26, 2015 | 11.3 | Saved by Coach |
| Live Playoffs (Top 24) | "I Drive Your Truck" | Lee Brice | November 10, 2015 | 16.12 | Saved by Public Vote |
| Live Top 12 | "Right Here Waiting" | Richard Marx | November 16, 2015 | 18.6 | Saved by Public Vote |
| Live Top 11 | "Delta Dawn" | Alex Harvey | November 23, 2015 | 20.3 | Saved by Public Vote |
| Live Top 10 | "I'd Love to Lay You Down" | Conway Twitty | November 30, 2015 | 22.10 | Saved by Public Vote |
| Live Semi-finals (Top 9) | "Ghost" | Ella Henderson | December 7, 2015 | 24.1 | Saved by Public Vote |
| Live Finals (Top 4) | "Die a Happy Man" | Thomas Rhett | December 14, 2015 | 26.6 | 3rd place |
| Live Finals (Top 4) | "Rhinestone Cowboy" (with Blake Shelton) | Glen Campbell | December 14, 2015 | 26.3 | 3rd place |
| Live Finals (Top 4) | "Silent Night" | Traditional | December 14, 2015 | 26.9 | 3rd place |

Non Competition Performances:
| Order | Collaborators | Song | Original Artist |
|---|---|---|---|
| 17.3 | Ivonne Acero, Emily Ann Roberts, Zach Seabaugh, Nadjah Nicole, Morgan Frazier | "Stand" | Rascal Flatts |
| 1.91 | Emily Ann Roberts and Zach Seabaugh | "Lean on Me" | Bill Withers |
| 27.2 | Zach Seabaugh | "Forever and Ever, Amen" | Randy Travis |
| 27.11 | Wynonna | "No One Else on Earth" | Wynonna |

=== 2016: New music ===
On February 13, 2016, Baber released a new single, "Kiss Me Hello," co-written with Kenny Lamb. Baber released his newest album "A Room Full of Fighters" on November 4, 2016. Within the first day of the album's release, it topped the ITunes Charts at top 20.

== Discography ==
=== Albums ===
| Title | Album details | Peak chart positions | Sales |
| Title | Album details | US | Sales |
|---|---|---|---|
| The Voice: The Complete Season 9 Collection | Released: December 15, 2015; Label: Republic Records; Format: Digital download | 137 | |

=== Singles ===
| Year | Title | Peak chart positions | |
| Year | Title | US Country | US |
|---|---|---|---|
| 2015 | "I Drive Your Truck" | — | — |
| 2015 | "Right Here Waiting" | 36 | — |
| 2015 | "Delta Dawn" | 47 | — |
| 2015 | "I'd Just Love to Lay You Down" | 16 | 92 |
| 2015 | "Ghost" | 32 | — |
| 2015 | "Die a Happy Man" | 30 | — |
| 2015 | "Rhinestone Cowboy" (with Blake Shelton) | 40 | — |
| 2015 | "Silent Night" | 44 | — |
"—" denotes releases that did not chart
