= Vachal =

Vachal is a surname. Notable people with the surname include:

- Amy Vachal (born 1988), American singer
- Josef Váchal (1884–1969), Czech writer
- Joseph Vachal (1838–1911), French politician
