= The Voice (American TV series) season 9 =

The Voice
- Season 9
- Promotional poster featuring coaches Levine, Shelton, Stefani, and Williams
- Hosted by: Carson Daly
- Coaches: Adam Levine; Gwen Stefani; Pharrell Williams; Blake Shelton
- No. of contestants: 48 artists
- Winner: Jordan Smith
- Winning coach: Adam Levine
- Runner-up: Emily Ann Roberts

Release
- Original network: NBC
- Original release: September 21 – December 15, 2015

Season chronology
- ← Previous; Season 8 Next → Season 10

The ninth season of the American reality talent show The Voice premiered on September 21, 2015 on NBC. Adam Levine, Blake Shelton, and Pharrell Williams returned as coaches for the season. Gwen Stefani returned after a one-season absence. Carson Daly continued as host.

The season introduced a "Coach Comeback" where each coach bring back one artist from the Battle or Knockout rounds to perform again in the Live Playoffs, and single elimination rounds during the Live Shows (except for the Semifinals).

Jordan Smith was named the winner of the season, marking Adam Levine's third win as a coach.

== Coaches and host ==
Adam Levine and Blake Shelton returned for their ninth season as coaches; Pharrell Williams, his third; and Gwen Stefani, her second season, after a season hiatus. The advisors for this season included Missy Elliott for Team Pharrell, John Fogerty for Team Adam, Brad Paisley for Team Blake, and Selena Gomez for Team Gwen. Rihanna served as an advisor for all teams during the Knockouts. Carson Daly returned as host for his ninth season.

Coaches and Host for The Voice Season 9

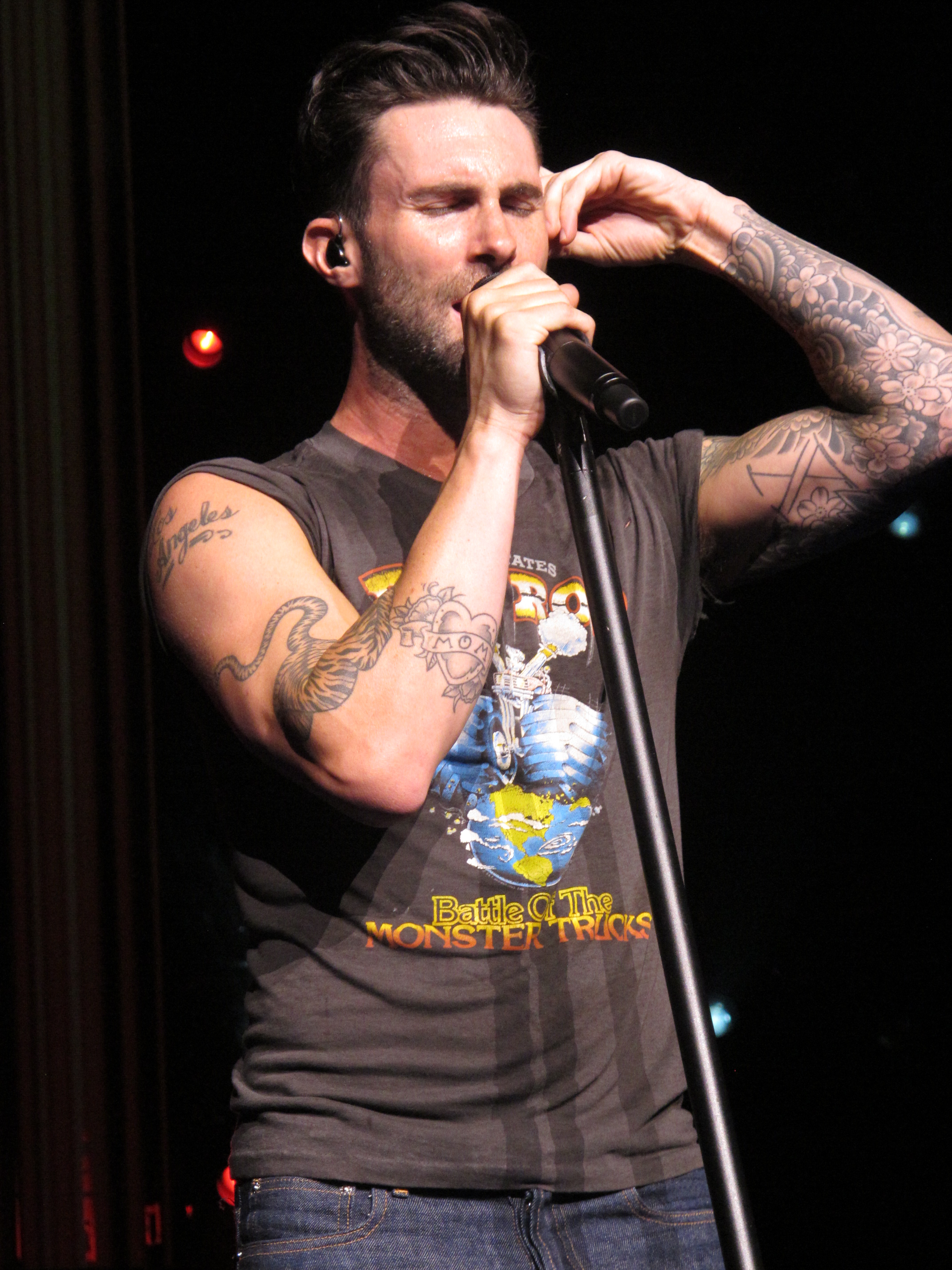
Adam Levine

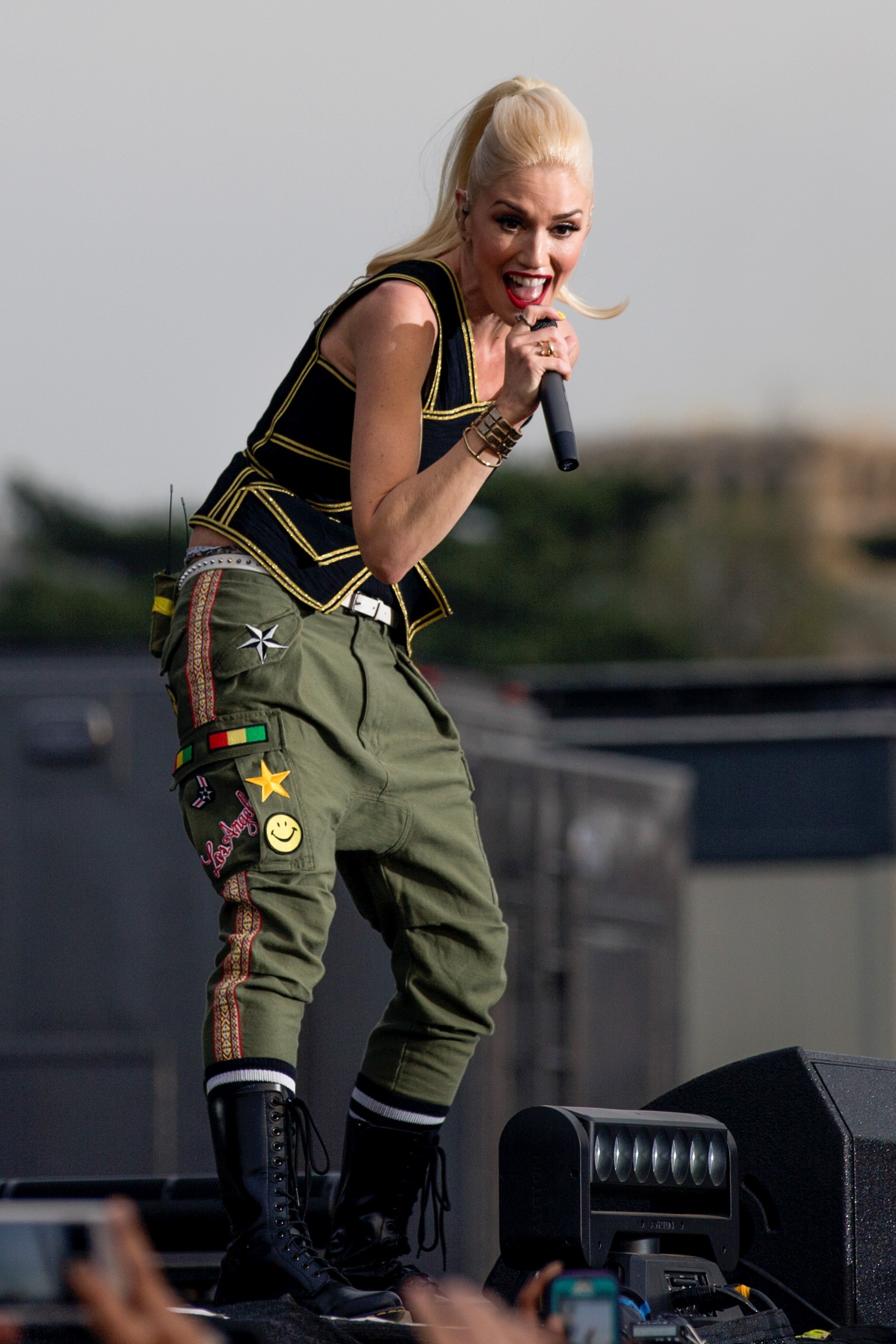
Gwen Stefani

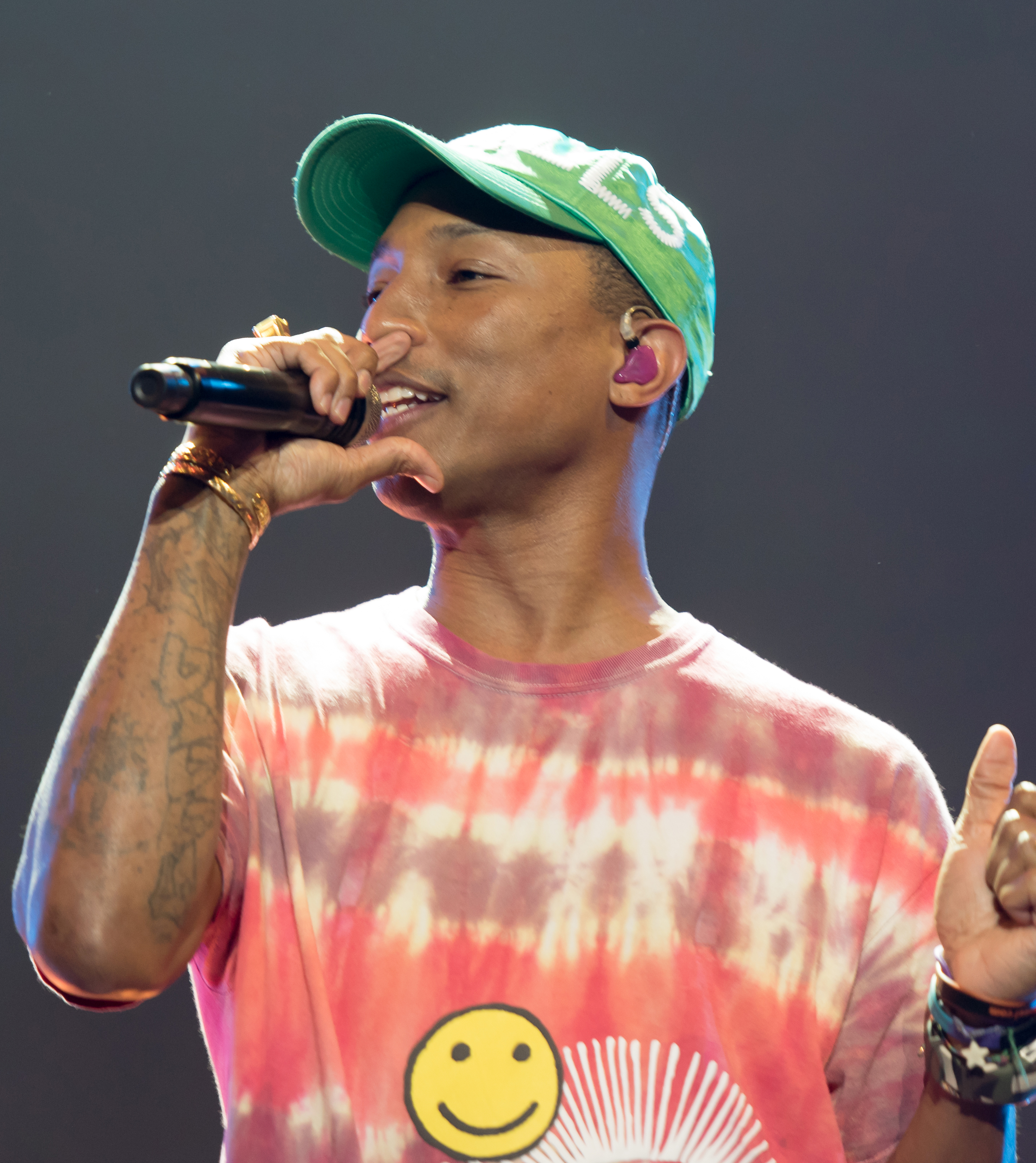
Pharrell Williams

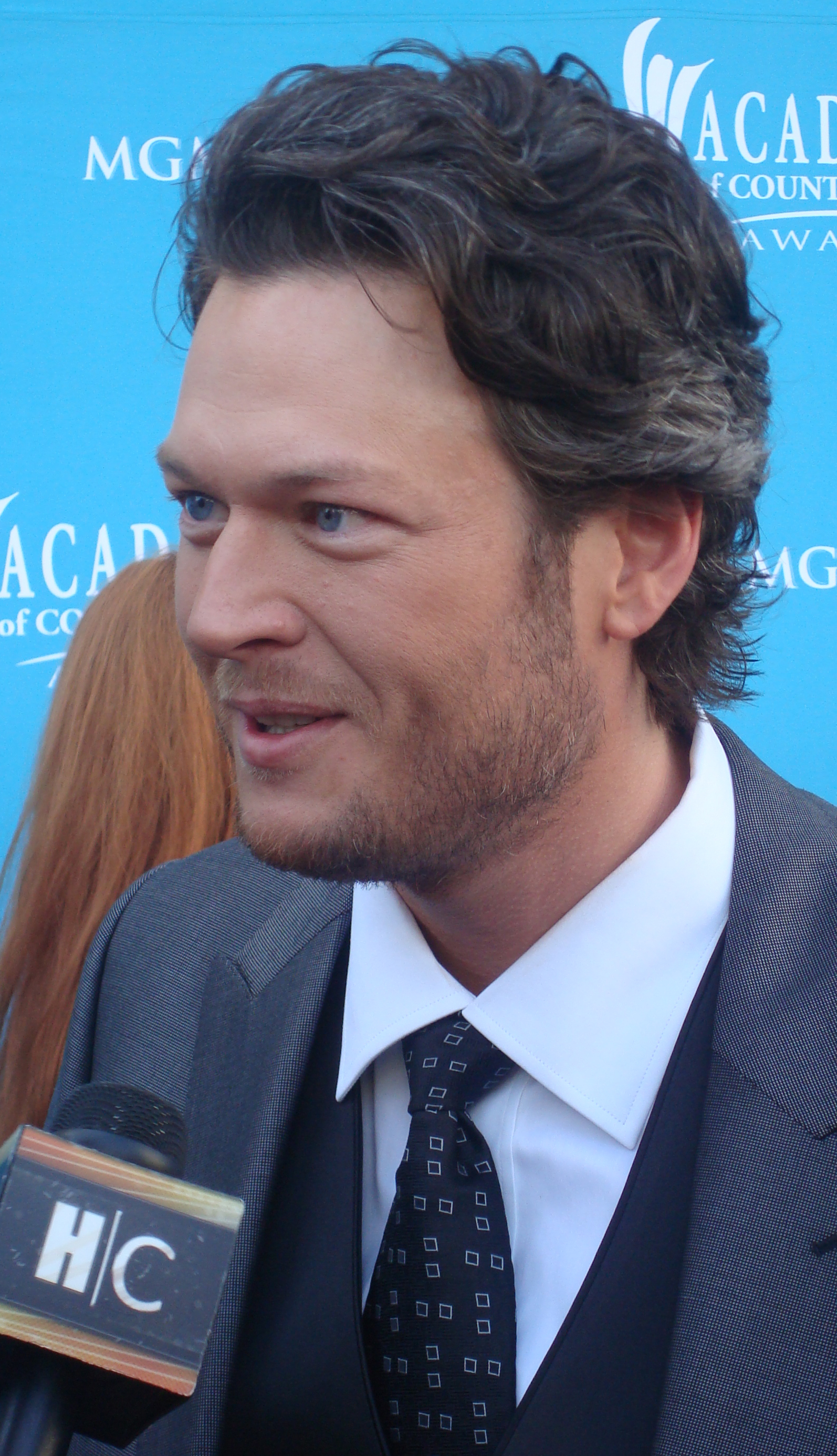
Blake Shelton

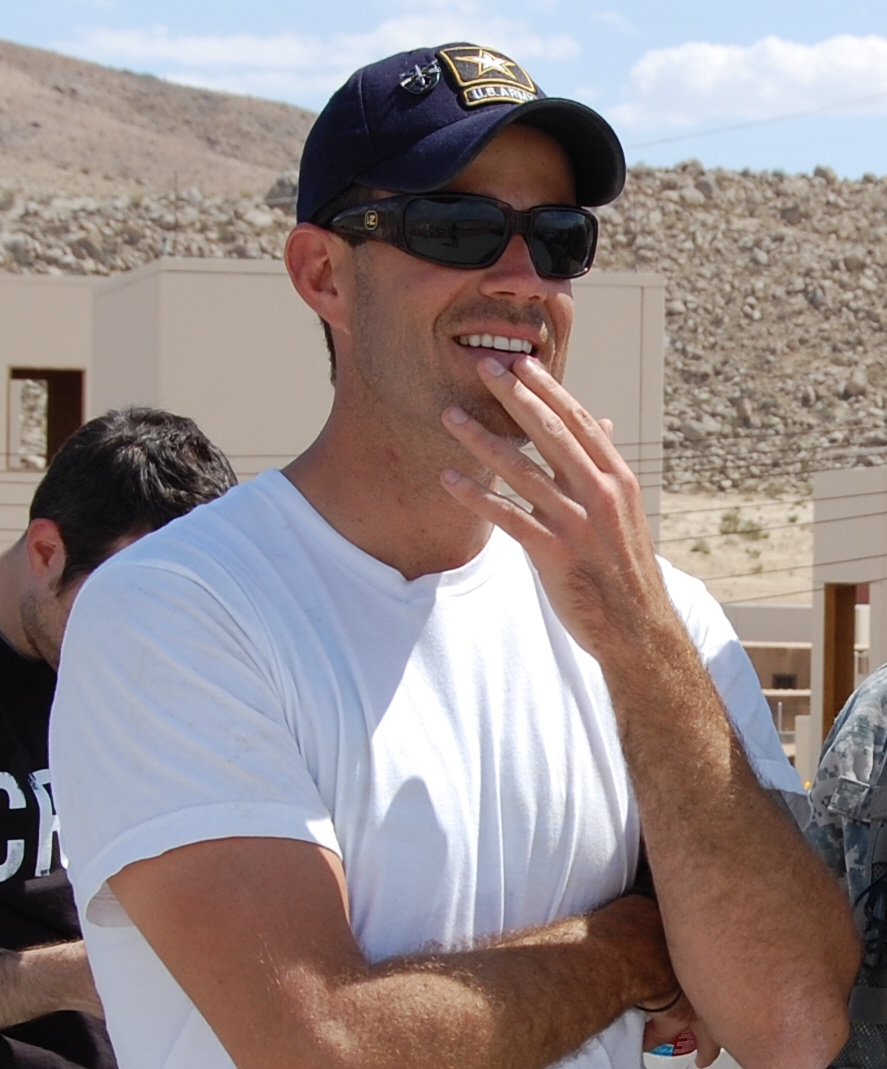
Carson Daly

== Teams ==
Color key

- Winner
- Runner-up
- Third place
- Fourth place
- Eliminated in the Live Shows
- Eliminated in Live Playoffs
- Selected by another coach as their Coach Comeback
- Stolen in the Knockout rounds
- Eliminated in the Knockout rounds
- Stolen in the Battle rounds
- Eliminated in the Battle rounds

| Coaches | Top 48 artists | | | | | |
|---|---|---|---|---|---|---|
| Adam Levine | | | | | | |
| Adam Levine | Jordan Smith | Shelby Brown | Amy Vachal | Blaine Mitchell | **Chance Peña** | Keith Semple |
| Adam Levine | ~~Viktor Király~~ | Andi & Alex | Dustin Christensen | James Dupré | ~~Regina Love~~ | ~~Chance Peña~~ |
| Adam Levine | Amanda Ayala | Manny Cabo | Dustin Monk | Cassandra Robertson | | |
| Gwen Stefani | | | | | | |
| Gwen Stefani | Jeffery Austin | Braiden Sunshine | Korin Bukowski | Viktor Király | **Ellie Lawrence** | Regina Love |
| Gwen Stefani | ~~Riley Biederer~~ | Summer Schappell | Kota Wade | ~~Tim Atlas~~ | Hanna Ashbrook | Lyndsey Elm |
| Gwen Stefani | Noah Jackson | Alex Kandel | Chase Kerby | | | |
| Pharrell Williams | | | | | | |
| Pharrell Williams | Madi Davis | Evan McKeel | Mark Hood | **Celeste Betton** | Riley Biederer | Darius Scott |
| Pharrell Williams | ~~Morgan Frazier~~ | ~~Amy Vachal~~ | Tim Atlas | Siahna Im | ~~Ivonne Acero~~ | ~~Riley Biederer~~ |
| Pharrell Williams | Daria Jazmin | Jubal & Amanda | Sydney Rhame | | | |
| Blake Shelton | | | | | | |
| Blake Shelton | Emily Ann Roberts | Barrett Baber | Zach Seabaugh | Ivonne Acero | Morgan Frazier | **Nadjah Nicole** |
| Blake Shelton | ~~Chance Peña~~ | Blind Joe | Chris Crump | ~~Dustin Christensen~~ | ~~Morgan Frazier~~ | ~~Blaine Mitchell~~ |
| Blake Shelton | Cole Criske | Tyler Dickerson | Krista Hughes | | | |
Note: Italicized names are stolen artists (names struck through within former teams). Bolded names are artists who received the Coach Comeback and advanced to the Live Playoffs.

== Blind auditions ==
The first phase of the competition, the Blind Auditions, taped on June 29–30 and July 7–8, 2015, and began airing when the season premiered on September 21, 2015.

Color key

| ✔ | Coach hit his or her "I WANT YOU" button |
| | Artist defaulted to this coach's team |
| | Artist selected to join this coach's team |
| | Artist eliminated with no coach pressing his or her "I WANT YOU" button |

=== Episode 1 (Sept. 21) ===
The four coaches performed a medley of each other's songs, including "Neon Light", "Don't Speak", "Sugar" and "Get Lucky", which were sung by Gwen Stefani, Blake Shelton, Pharrell Williams, and Adam Levine, respectively.

| Order | Artist | Age | Hometown | Song | Coach's and contestant's choices | | | |
| Order | Artist | Age | Hometown | Song | Adam | Gwen | Pharrell | Blake |
|---|---|---|---|---|---|---|---|---|
| 1 | Mark Hood | 24 | Chicago, Illinois | "Use Me" | ✔ | ✔ | ✔ | ✔ |
| 2 | Kota Wade | 20 | Los Angeles, California | "Bring It On Home to Me" | — | ✔ | ✔ | ✔ |
| 3 | Keith Semple | 34 | Larne, Northern Ireland, UK | "I'll Be There for You" | ✔ | ✔ | — | — |
| 4 | Alyssa Sheridan | 18 | San Diego, California | "I Will Remember You" | — | — | — | — |
| 5 | Siahna Im | 15 | Auburn, Washington | "Fever" | — | ✔ | ✔ | ✔ |
| 6 | Jordan Smith | 22 | Harlan, Kentucky | "Chandelier" | ✔ | ✔ | ✔ | ✔ |
| 7 | Dr. Paul | 66 | Hayesville, North Carolina | "Mama Tried" | — | — | — | — |
| 8 | Nadjah Nicole | 23 | New Castle, Delaware | "Tightrope" | ✔ | — | — | ✔ |
| 9 | Braiden Sunshine | 14 | Old Lyme, Connecticut | "The Mountains Win Again" | — | ✔ | ✔ | — |
| 10 | Michael Woolery | 25 | Los Angeles, California | "Say" | — | — | — | — |
| 11 | Barrett Baber | 34 | Marion, Arkansas | "Angel Eyes" | ✔ | ✔ | ✔ | ✔ |

=== Episode 2 (Sept. 22) ===
| Order | Artist | Age | Hometown | Song | Coach's and contestant's choices | | | |
| Order | Artist | Age | Hometown | Song | Adam | Gwen | Pharrell | Blake |
|---|---|---|---|---|---|---|---|---|
| 1 | "Blind Joe" | 33 | Fargo, North Dakota | "If It Hadn't Been for Love" | ✔ | ✔ | ✔ | ✔ |
| 2 | Ivonne Acero | 17 | Aguila, Arizona | "Style" | — | ✔ | ✔ | — |
| 3 | Gage Navarro | 21 | Selma, California | "Ain't No Rest For the Wicked" | — | — | — | — |
| 4 | Regina Love | 51 | Atlanta, Georgia | "Rock Steady" | ✔ | — | — | ✔ |
| 5 | Zach Seabaugh | 16 | Marietta, Georgia | "Take Your Time" | ✔ | — | ✔ | ✔ |
| 6 | Evan McKeel | 20 | Richmond, Virginia | "Typical" | ✔ | ✔ | ✔ | ✔ |
| 7 | Bryan Bautista | 23 | Brooklyn, New York | "Locked Out of Heaven" | — | — | — | — |
| 8 | Emily Ann Roberts | 16 | Knoxville, Tennessee | "I Hope You Dance" | ✔ | — | — | ✔ |
| 9 | Ellie Lawrence | 26 | Calhoun, Georgia | "We Don't Have to Take Our Clothes Off" | ✔ | ✔ | ✔ | — |
| 10 | Noah Jackson | 19 | Sunderland, Massachusetts | "Elastic Heart" | — | ✔ | — | — |
| 11 | Tim Atlas | 26 | San Jose, California | "Give Me Love" | — | ✔ | — | — |
| 12 | Hanna Ashbrook | 23 | Mount Prospect, Illinois | "Closer" | — | ✔ | — | — |
| 13 | Natalie Yacovazzi | 28 | Chicago, Illinois | "Oh! Darling" | — | — | — | — |
| 14 | James Dupré | 30 | Bayou Chicot, Louisiana | "Let Her Cry" | ✔ | ✔ | ✔ | ✔ |

=== Episode 3 (Sept. 28) ===
| Order | Artist | Age | Hometown | Song | Coach's and contestant's choices | | | |
| Order | Artist | Age | Hometown | Song | Adam | Gwen | Pharrell | Blake |
|---|---|---|---|---|---|---|---|---|
| 1 | Morgan Frazier | 22 | Nashville, Tennessee | "I Want You to Want Me" | — | ✔ | — | ✔ |
| 2 | Amanda Ayala | 17 | New York, New York | "Mississippi Queen" | ✔ | — | ✔ | ✔ |
| 3 | Jeffery Austin | 24 | Chicago, Illinois | "Lay Me Down" | — | ✔ | — | — |
| 4 | Lyndsey Elm | 22 | Vacaville, California | "Lips Are Movin'" | ✔ | ✔ | ✔ | ✔ |
| 5 | Joe Maye | 23 | Baltimore, Maryland | "Word Up!" | — | — | — | — |
| 6 | Manny Cabo | 45 | Elizabeth, New Jersey | "Here I Go Again" | ✔ | ✔ | ✔ | ✔ |
| 7 | Madi Davis | 16 | McKinney, Texas | "It's Too Late" | — | ✔ | ✔ | — |
| 8 | Caleb Lee Hutchinson | 16 | Dallas, Georgia | "The Dance" | — | — | — | — |
| 9 | Riley Biederer | 19 | Atlanta, Georgia | "Invincible" | — | — | ✔ | — |
| 10 | Cassandra Robertson | 45 | Dallas, Texas | "Ghost" | ✔ | — | — | — |
| 11 | Daria Jazmin | 20 | Los Angeles, California | "Dear Future Husband" | — | ✔ | ✔ | ✔ |
| 12 | Chris Crump | 31 | Baytown, Texas | "Thinking Out Loud" | ✔ | ✔ | ✔ | ✔ |
| 13 | Tyler Dickerson | 21 | Denham Springs, Louisiana | "Hard To Handle" | — | — | — | ✔ |
| 14 | Jubal & Amanda (Jubal Lee Young & Amanda Preslar) | 44 / 36 | Tulsa, Oklahoma | "Seven Bridges Road" | — | ✔ | ✔ | — |

=== Episode 4 (Sept. 29) ===
| Order | Artist | Age | Hometown | Song | Coach's and contestant's choices | | | |
| Order | Artist | Age | Hometown | Song | Adam | Gwen | Pharrell | Blake |
|---|---|---|---|---|---|---|---|---|
| 1 | Darius Scott | 23 | Dallas, Texas | "You Make Me Wanna..." | ✔ | ✔ | ✔ | — |
| 2 | Korin Bukowski | 19 | Miami, Florida | "Cecilia and the Satellite" | — | ✔ | — | — |
| 3 | Krista Hughes | 22 | Coal City, West Virginia | "Angel from Montgomery" | ✔ | ✔ | ✔ | ✔ |
| 4 | Janae Strother | 28 | Herndon, Virginia | "Uptown Funk" | — | — | — | — |
| 5 | Chance Peña | 15 | Tyler, Texas | "I See Fire" | ✔ | — | — | — |
| 6 | Viktor Király | 31 | New York, New York | "What's Going On" | ✔ | ✔ | ✔ | ✔ |
| 7 | Julie Broadus | 18 | Suwanee, Georgia | "Brand New Key" | — | — | — | — |
| 8 | Cole Criske | 16 | Temecula, California | "Dreaming with a Broken Heart" | — | ✔ | ✔ | ✔ |
| 9 | Alex Kandel | 22 | Nashville, Tennessee | "Bright" | ✔ | ✔ | — | — |
| 10 | Tom Rhodes | 26 | Oakland, California | "Hit the Road Jack" | — | — | — | — |
| 11 | Junior Reed | 20 | Menifee, California | "What I Got" | — | — | — | — |
| 12 | T'alia Scott | 30 | Miami, Florida | "Beneath Your Beautiful" | — | — | — | — |
| 13 | Celeste Betton | 27 | Hinesville, Georgia | "Love You I Do" | — | — | ✔ | — |
| 14 | Andi & Alex (Andi Peot & Alex Peot) | 24 | Green Bay, Wisconsin | "Thank You" | ✔ | ✔ | ✔ | ✔ |

=== Episode 5 (Oct. 5) ===
| Order | Artist | Age | Hometown | Song | Coach's and contestant's choices | | | |
| Order | Artist | Age | Hometown | Song | Adam | Gwen | Pharrell | Blake |
|---|---|---|---|---|---|---|---|---|
| 1 | Dustin Christensen | 35 | Orem, Utah | "Downtown Train" | ✔ | ✔ | ✔ | ✔ |
| 2 | Berdine Joseph | 19 | Port au Prince, Haiti | "Hey Mama" | — | — | — | — |
| 3 | Dustin Monk | 27 | Jacksonville, Florida | "Bright Lights" | ✔ | — | — | ✔ |
| 4 | Chase Kerby | 30 | Oklahoma City, Oklahoma | "The Scientist" | — | ✔ | — | — |
| 5 | Dawson Daugherty | 17 | Venice, California | "Problem" | — | — | — | — |
| 6 | Shelby Brown | 16 | Elberta, Alabama | "Stars" | ✔ | ✔ | ✔ | ✔ |
| 7 | Amy Vachal | 26 | Brooklyn, New York | "Dream a Little Dream of Me" | Team full | ✔ | ✔ | ✔ |
| 8 | Blaine Mitchell | 24 | Fort Worth, Texas | "Drops of Jupiter" | Team full | ✔ | — | ✔ |
| 9 | Summer Schappell | 21 | Redding, California | "Strawberry Wine" | Team full | ✔ | ✔ | Team full |
| 10 | Caroline Burns | 15 | Hollis, New Hampshire | "A Thousand Years" | Team full | Team full | — | Team full |
| 11 | Andy Buckner | 34 | Asheville, North Carolina | "Can't You See" | Team full | Team full | — | Team full |
| 12 | Justen Harden | 20 | Brunswick, Georgia | "Firecracker" | Team full | Team full | — | Team full |
| 13 | Adam Melchor | 21 | Jersey City, New Jersey | "Norwegian Wood (This Bird Has Flown)" | Team full | Team full | — | Team full |
| 14 | Sydney Rhame | 16 | Decatur, Georgia | "Photograph" | Team full | Team full | ✔ | Team full |

=== Episode 6 (Oct. 6) ===
Episode 6, titled "The Best of The Blind Auditions," recalled the Blind Auditions this season.

== The Battles ==
The Battles (episodes 7 to 10) consisted of two 2-hour episodes and two 1-hour episodes each on October 12, 13, 19 and 20, 2015. Season nine's advisors are Missy Elliott for Team Pharrell, John Fogerty for Team Adam, Brad Paisley for Team Blake, and Selena Gomez for Team Gwen. As like the previous battle rounds since season 3, each coach can exercise a use of two steals to save two losing artists from opposing coaches to put through to the Knockouts. At the end of the Knockouts, each coach reinstate a previously eliminated artist from either the Battles or Knockouts to participate in the Live Playoffs.

Color key:

| Artist won the Battle and advanced to the Knockouts |
| Artist lost the Battle but was stolen by another coach and advanced to the Knockouts |
| Artist lost the Battle and was originally eliminated but received the Coach Comeback and advanced to the Live Playoffs |
| Artist lost the Battle and was eliminated |

| Episode | Coach | Order | Winner | Song | Loser | 'Steal' result | | | |
| Episode | Coach | Order | Winner | Song | Loser | Adam | Gwen | Pharrell | Blake |
|---|---|---|---|---|---|---|---|---|---|
| Episode 7^{1} (Monday, Oct 12, 2015) | Adam Levine | 1 | Jordan Smith | "Like I Can" | Regina Love | —N/a | ✔ | — | — |
| Episode 7^{1} (Monday, Oct 12, 2015) | Blake Shelton | 2 | Zach Seabaugh | "I'm Gonna Be Somebody" | Tyler Dickerson | — | — | — | —N/a |
| Episode 7^{1} (Monday, Oct 12, 2015) | Gwen Stefani | 3 | Ellie Lawrence | "Sweater Weather" | Tim Atlas | — | —N/a | ✔ | — |
| Episode 7^{1} (Monday, Oct 12, 2015) | Pharrell Williams | 4 | Mark Hood | "Ain't No Mountain High Enough" | Celeste Betton | — | — | —N/a | — |
| Episode 7^{1} (Monday, Oct 12, 2015) | Adam Levine | 5 | James Dupré | "Fortunate Son" | Dustin Monk | —N/a | — | — | — |
| Episode 7^{1} (Monday, Oct 12, 2015) | Blake Shelton | 6 | Barrett Baber | "Walking in Memphis" | Dustin Christensen | ✔ | ✔ | — | —N/a |
| Episode 8 (Tuesday, Oct 13, 2015) | Adam Levine | 1 | Keith Semple | "Baba O'Riley" | Manny Cabo | —N/a | — | — | — |
| Episode 8 (Tuesday, Oct 13, 2015) | Blake Shelton | 2 | Chris Crump | "When I Get Where I'm Going" | Krista Hughes | — | — | — | —N/a |
| Episode 8 (Tuesday, Oct 13, 2015) | Pharrell Williams | 3 | Madi Davis | "Riptide" | Sydney Rhame | — | — | —N/a | — |
| Episode 8 (Tuesday, Oct 13, 2015) | Gwen Stefani | 4 | Kota Wade | "It's My Life" | Alex Kandel | — | —N/a | — | — |
| Episode 8 (Tuesday, Oct 13, 2015) | Gwen Stefani | 5 | Jeffery Austin | "Can't Feel My Face" | Noah Jackson | — | —N/a | — | — |
| Episode 8 (Tuesday, Oct 13, 2015) | Pharrell Williams | 6 | Siahna Im | "You Keep Me Hangin' On" | Ivonne Acero | — | ✔ | —N/a | ✔ |
| Episode 9 (Monday, Oct 19, 2015) | Blake Shelton | 1 | Blind Joe | "Old Time Rock and Roll" | Blaine Mitchell | ✔ | — | — | —N/a |
| Episode 9 (Monday, Oct 19, 2015) | Adam Levine | 2 | Viktor Kiraly | "Nobody Knows" | Cassandra Robertson | Team full | — | — | — |
| Episode 9 (Monday, Oct 19, 2015) | Gwen Stefani | 3 | Korin Bukowski | "Samson" | Chase Kerby | Team full | —N/a | — | — |
| Episode 9 (Monday, Oct 19, 2015) | Pharrell Williams | 4 | Evan McKeel | "Higher Ground" | Riley Biederer | Team full | ✔ | —N/a | — |
| Episode 9 (Monday, Oct 19, 2015) | Gwen Stefani | 5 | Braiden Sunshine | "No One Is to Blame" | Lyndsey Elm | Team full | Team full | — | — |
| Episode 9 (Monday, Oct 19, 2015) | Adam Levine | 6 | Andi & Alex | "Wherever You Will Go" | Chance Peña | Team full | Team full | — | ✔ |
| Episode 10 (Tuesday, Oct 20, 2015) | Adam Levine | 1 | Shelby Brown | "Edge of Seventeen" | Amanda Ayala | Team full | Team full | — | Team full |
| Episode 10 (Tuesday, Oct 20, 2015) | Pharrell Williams | 2 | Amy Vachal | "To Love Somebody" | Jubal & Amanda | Team full | Team full | —N/a | Team full |
| Episode 10 (Tuesday, Oct 20, 2015) | Pharrell Williams | 3 | Darius Scott | "Lean on Me" | Daria Jazmin | Team full | Team full | —N/a | Team full |
| Episode 10 (Tuesday, Oct 20, 2015) | Blake Shelton | 4 | Nadjah Nicole | "Baby One More Time" | Cole Criske | Team full | Team full | — | Team full |
| Episode 10 (Tuesday, Oct 20, 2015) | Gwen Stefani | 5 | Summer Schappell | "Leave the Pieces" | Hanna Ashbrook | Team full | Team full | — | Team full |
| Episode 10 (Tuesday, Oct 20, 2015) | Blake Shelton | 6 | Emily Ann Roberts | "I'm That Kind of Girl" | Morgan Frazier | Team full | Team full | ✔ | Team full |

== The Knockouts ==
For the Knockouts, Rihanna was assigned as a mentor for contestants in all four teams. As in previous seasons, the coaches can steal one losing artist. The top 20 contestants will then move on to the Live Shows.

Color key:

| Artist won the Knockout and advanced to the Live Playoffs |
| Artist lost the Knockout but was stolen by another coach and advanced to the Live Playoffs |
| Artist lost the Knockout and was originally eliminated but received the Coach Comeback and advanced to the Live Playoffs |
| Artist lost the Knockout and was eliminated |

| Episode | Coach | Order | Song | Artists | | Song | 'Steal' result | | | |
| Episode | Coach | Order | Song | Winner | Loser | Song | Adam | Gwen | Pharrell | Blake |
|---|---|---|---|---|---|---|---|---|---|---|
| Episode 11 (Monday, Oct 26, 2015) | Adam Levine | 1 | "Hold Back the River" | Blaine Mitchell | Andi & Alex | "Stupid Boy" | —N/a | — | — | — |
| Episode 11 (Monday, Oct 26, 2015) | Gwen Stefani | 2 | "Feeling Good" | Braiden Sunshine | Ellie Lawrence | "Cool for the Summer" | — | —N/a | — | — |
| Episode 11 (Monday, Oct 26, 2015) | Blake Shelton | 3 | "Colder Weather" | Barrett Baber | Blind Joe | "Mammas Don't Let Your Babies Grow Up to Be Cowboys" | — | — | — | —N/a |
| Episode 11 (Monday, Oct 26, 2015) | Pharrell Williams | 4 | "A Case of You" | Madi Davis | Amy Vachal | "A Sunday Kind of Love" | ✔ | — | —N/a | ✔ |
| Episode 11 (Monday, Oct 26, 2015) | Blake Shelton | 5 | "Part of Me" | Ivonne Acero | Chance Peña | "Demons" | Team full | — | — | —N/a |
| Episode 11 (Monday, Oct 26, 2015) | Adam Levine | 6 | "Set Fire to the Rain" | Jordan Smith | Viktor Kiraly | "If I Ain't Got You" | Team full | ✔ | — | — |
| Episode 12 (Tuesday, Oct 27, 2015) | Gwen Stefani | 1 | "All I Want" | Korin Bukowski | Summer Schappell | "Little White Church" | Team full | Team full | — | — |
| Episode 12 (Tuesday, Oct 27, 2015) | Adam Levine | 2 | "I Want to Know What Love Is" | Keith Semple | Dustin Christensen | "Free" | Team full | Team full | — | — |
| Episode 12 (Tuesday, Oct 27, 2015) | Pharrell Williams | 3 | "On Broadway" | Darius Scott | Morgan Frazier | "Even If It Breaks Your Heart" | Team full | Team full | —N/a | ✔ |
| Episode 13^{1} (Monday, Nov 2, 2015) | Adam Levine | 1 | "Jesus, Take the Wheel" | Shelby Brown | James Dupré | "Sure Be Cool If You Did" | Team full | Team full | — | Team full |
| Episode 13^{1} (Monday, Nov 2, 2015) | Pharrell Williams | 2 | "Stand by Me" | Mark Hood | Siahna Im | "Back to Black" | Team full | Team full | —N/a | Team full |
| Episode 13^{1} (Monday, Nov 2, 2015) | Gwen Stefani | 3 | "Turning Tables" | Jeffery Austin | Kota Wade | "Barracuda" | Team full | Team full | — | Team full |
| Episode 13^{1} (Monday, Nov 2, 2015) | Blake Shelton | 4 | "Cowboy Take Me Away" | Emily Ann Roberts | Nadjah Nicole | "A Woman's Worth" | Team full | Team full | — | Team full |
| Episode 13^{1} (Monday, Nov 2, 2015) | Blake Shelton | 5 | "Somebody's Heartbreak" | Zach Seabaugh | Chris Crump | "I Wish It Would Rain" | Team full | Team full | — | Team full |
| Episode 13^{1} (Monday, Nov 2, 2015) | Pharrell Williams | 6 | "Dare You to Move" | Evan McKeel | Tim Atlas | "Torn" | Team full | Team full | —N/a | Team full |
| Episode 13^{1} (Monday, Nov 2, 2015) | Gwen Stefani | 7 | "Midnight Train to Georgia" | Regina Love | Riley Biederer | "XO" | Team full | Team full | ✔ | Team full |
| Episode 14^{2} (Tuesday, Nov 3, 2015) | The fourteenth episode was a special one-hour episode titled "The Road to the Live Shows." The episode showed the best moments of the season so far, including the blind auditions, the journey of the top 20 contestants and some unseen footage. | | | | | | | | | |

^{1} Chance Peña is on Team Adam for the Live Shows.

== Live shows ==
The Live Shows is the final phase of the competition. It consists of six weeks of live shows starting with the playoffs and ending on the season finale. The traditional iTunes multiplier bonus begins with the Live Playoffs and continues through the end of the semi-finals. The Instant Save feature applies starting on the top 12 week until the semi-finals.

For the first time in the show's history, a "Coach Comeback" feature was introduced where each coach reinstated one previously eliminated artist from the Battles or Knockouts to perform in the Live Playoffs with the top 20 and will get a chance to move on to the live shows as part of the top 12.

Color key:

| Artist was saved by the public's votes |
| Artist was saved by his/her coach or was placed in the bottom two or middle three |
| Artist was saved by Instant Save (via Twitter) |
| Artist's iTunes vote was multiplied by 10 (except the finals) after his/her studio version of the song reached the iTunes top 10 within the applicable voting window |
| Artist was eliminated |

=== Week 1: Live Playoffs (Nov. 9, 10 & 11) ===
The Live Playoffs comprises episodes 15, 16, and 17 (the results show). The top 24 artists perform, with the two artists per each team advances via public vote, while the bottom four artists compete for the coaches' save in the results show. The Monday broadcast featured Teams Adam and Gwen, while the Tuesday broadcast featured Teams Pharrell and Blake.

Jordan Smith's "Halo" reached #3 on iTunes and Emily Ann Roberts' "In The Garden" peaked at #6; both received iTunes bonus multipliers in their respective voting windows.

| Episode | Coach | Order | Artist | Song | Result |
|---|---|---|---|---|---|
| Episode 15 (Monday, Nov 9, 2015) | Adam Levine | 1 | Blaine Mitchell | "Never Tear Us Apart" | Eliminated |
| Episode 15 (Monday, Nov 9, 2015) | Gwen Stefani | 2 | Regina Love | "Hello" | Eliminated |
| Episode 15 (Monday, Nov 9, 2015) | Adam Levine | 3 | Keith Semple | "To Be With You" | Eliminated |
| Episode 15 (Monday, Nov 9, 2015) | Adam Levine | 4 | Shelby Brown | "You're No Good" | Public's vote |
| Episode 15 (Monday, Nov 9, 2015) | Gwen Stefani | 5 | Korin Bukowski | "Adia" | Gwen's choice |
| Episode 15 (Monday, Nov 9, 2015) | Gwen Stefani | 6 | Ellie Lawrence | "Ex's & Oh's" | Eliminated |
| Episode 15 (Monday, Nov 9, 2015) | Gwen Stefani | 7 | Jeffery Austin | "Say You Love Me" | Public's vote |
| Episode 15 (Monday, Nov 9, 2015) | Gwen Stefani | 8 | Braiden Sunshine | "Everything I Own" | Public's vote |
| Episode 15 (Monday, Nov 9, 2015) | Adam Levine | 9 | Amy Vachal | "The Way You Look Tonight" | Adam's choice |
| Episode 15 (Monday, Nov 9, 2015) | Gwen Stefani | 10 | Viktor Király | "All Around the World" | Eliminated |
| Episode 15 (Monday, Nov 9, 2015) | Adam Levine | 11 | Chance Peña | "Barton Hollow" | Eliminated |
| Episode 15 (Monday, Nov 9, 2015) | Adam Levine | 12 | Jordan Smith | "Halo" | Public's vote |
| Episode 16 (Tuesday, Nov 10, 2015) | Pharrell Williams | 1 | Darius Scott | "Love Lockdown" | Eliminated |
| Episode 16 (Tuesday, Nov 10, 2015) | Blake Shelton | 2 | Ivonne Acero | "One of Us" | Eliminated |
| Episode 16 (Tuesday, Nov 10, 2015) | Blake Shelton | 3 | Morgan Frazier | "Lips of an Angel" | Eliminated |
| Episode 16 (Tuesday, Nov 10, 2015) | Pharrell Williams | 4 | Evan McKeel | "Overjoyed" | Public's vote |
| Episode 16 (Tuesday, Nov 10, 2015) | Pharrell Williams | 5 | Madi Davis | "Songbird" | Public's vote |
| Episode 16 (Tuesday, Nov 10, 2015) | Pharrell Williams | 6 | Celeste Betton | "Something In the Water" | Eliminated |
| Episode 16 (Tuesday, Nov 10, 2015) | Blake Shelton | 7 | Zach Seabaugh | "Brand New Girlfriend" | Public's vote |
| Episode 16 (Tuesday, Nov 10, 2015) | Pharrell Williams | 8 | Riley Biederer | "Should've Been Us" | Eliminated |
| Episode 16 (Tuesday, Nov 10, 2015) | Blake Shelton | 9 | Nadjah Nicole | "Upside Down" | Eliminated |
| Episode 16 (Tuesday, Nov 10, 2015) | Blake Shelton | 10 | Emily Ann Roberts | "In the Garden" | Blake's choice |
| Episode 16 (Tuesday, Nov 10, 2015) | Pharrell Williams | 11 | Mark Hood | "What Do You Mean?" | Pharrell's choice |
| Episode 16 (Tuesday, Nov 10, 2015) | Blake Shelton | 12 | Barrett Baber | "I Drive Your Truck" | Public's vote |

Non-competition performances
| Order | Performer | Song |
|---|---|---|
| 17.1 | Team Gwen (Braiden Sunshine, Ellie Lawrence, Jeffery Austin, Korin Bukowski, Regina Love, and Viktor Király) | "O-o-h Child" |
| 17.2 | Sawyer Fredericks | "Take It All" |
| 17.3 | Team Blake (Barrett Baber, Emily Ann Roberts, Ivonne Acero, Morgan Frazier, Nadjah Nicole, and Zach Seabaugh) | "Stand" |
| 17.4 | Team Pharrell (Celeste Betton, Darius Scott, Evan McKeel, Madi Davis, Mark Hood, and Riley Biederer) | "Everybody Hurts" |
| 17.5 | Team Adam (Amy Vachal, Blaine Mitchell, Chance Peña, Jordan Smith, Keith Semple, and Shelby Brown) | "Diamonds" |

=== Week 2: Top 12 (Nov. 16 & 17) ===
In-lieu of the bottom three and the double elimination in contrast of previous seasons, this week feature single elimination until week four. The two artists with the lowest votes then performed in the Instant Save and faced the Twitter's votes.

iTunes bonus multipliers were awarded to Jordan Smith (#1), Amy Vachal (#6), and Jeffery Austin (#9).

| Episode | Coach | Order | Artist | Song | Result |
|---|---|---|---|---|---|
| Episode 18 (Monday, Nov 16, 2015) | Gwen Stefani | 1 | Braiden Sunshine | "Renegade" | Public's vote |
| Episode 18 (Monday, Nov 16, 2015) | Adam Levine | 2 | Amy Vachal | "Hotline Bling" | Public's vote |
| Episode 18 (Monday, Nov 16, 2015) | Pharrell Williams | 3 | Mark Hood | "Against All Odds" | Bottom two |
| Episode 18 (Monday, Nov 16, 2015) | Blake Shelton | 4 | Emily Ann Roberts | "Blame It On Your Heart" | Public's vote |
| Episode 18 (Monday, Nov 16, 2015) | Gwen Stefani | 5 | Korin Bukowski | "Titanium" | Bottom two |
| Episode 18 (Monday, Nov 16, 2015) | Blake Shelton | 6 | Barrett Baber | "Right Here Waiting" | Public's vote |
| Episode 18 (Monday, Nov 16, 2015) | Pharrell Williams | 7 | Madi Davis | "Who Will Save Your Soul" | Public's vote |
| Episode 18 (Monday, Nov 16, 2015) | Gwen Stefani | 8 | Jeffery Austin | "Let It Go" | Public's vote |
| Episode 18 (Monday, Nov 16, 2015) | Adam Levine | 9 | Shelby Brown | "In Color" | Public's vote |
| Episode 18 (Monday, Nov 16, 2015) | Pharrell Williams | 10 | Evan McKeel | "This Is It" | Public's vote |
| Episode 18 (Monday, Nov 16, 2015) | Adam Levine | 11 | Jordan Smith | "Great Is Thy Faithfulness" | Public's vote |
| Episode 18 (Monday, Nov 16, 2015) | Blake Shelton | 12 | Zach Seabaugh | "My Love" | Public's vote |
| Episode 19 (Tuesday, Nov 17, 2015) | Instant Save performances | | | | |
| Episode 19 (Tuesday, Nov 17, 2015) | Pharrell Williams | 1 | Mark Hood | "Signed, Sealed, Delivered I'm Yours" | Eliminated |
| Episode 19 (Tuesday, Nov 17, 2015) | Gwen Stefani | 2 | Korin Bukowski | "Don't Know Why" | Instant Save |

Non-competition performances
| Order | Performer | Song |
|---|---|---|
| 19.1 | Blake Shelton and his team (Barrett Baber, Emily Ann Roberts, and Zach Seabaugh) | "Lean on Me" |
| 19.2 | Pharrell Williams and his team (Evan McKeel, Madi Davis, and Mark Hood) | "Just a Cloud Away" |

=== Week 3: Top 11 (Nov. 23 & 24) ===
iTunes bonus multipliers were awarded to Vachal (#4), Smith (#8) and Emily Ann Roberts (#10).

| Episode | Coach | Order | Artist | Song | Result |
|---|---|---|---|---|---|
| Episode 20 (Monday, Nov 23, 2015) | Adam Levine | 1 | Shelby Brown | "You and I" | Public's vote |
| Episode 20 (Monday, Nov 23, 2015) | Pharrell Williams | 2 | Evan McKeel | "Smile" | Bottom two |
| Episode 20 (Monday, Nov 23, 2015) | Blake Shelton | 3 | Barrett Baber | "Delta Dawn" | Public's vote |
| Episode 20 (Monday, Nov 23, 2015) | Gwen Stefani | 4 | Korin Bukowski | "Only Hope" | Bottom two |
| Episode 20 (Monday, Nov 23, 2015) | Adam Levine | 5 | Amy Vachal | "Blank Space" | Public's vote |
| Episode 20 (Monday, Nov 23, 2015) | Blake Shelton | 6 | Zach Seabaugh | "Are You Gonna Kiss Me Or Not" | Public's vote |
| Episode 20 (Monday, Nov 23, 2015) | Pharrell Williams | 7 | Madi Davis | "Love Is Blindness" | Public's vote |
| Episode 20 (Monday, Nov 23, 2015) | Gwen Stefani | 8 | Braiden Sunshine | "True" | Public's vote |
| Episode 20 (Monday, Nov 23, 2015) | Adam Levine | 9 | Jordan Smith | "Who You Are" | Public's vote |
| Episode 20 (Monday, Nov 23, 2015) | Blake Shelton | 10 | Emily Ann Roberts | "Why Not Me" | Public's vote |
| Episode 20 (Monday, Nov 23, 2015) | Gwen Stefani | 11 | Jeffery Austin | "Dancing on My Own" | Public's vote |
| Episode 21 (Tuesday, Nov 24, 2015) | Instant Save performances | | | | |
| Episode 21 (Tuesday, Nov 24, 2015) | Pharrell Williams | 1 | Evan McKeel | "Let's Stay Together" | Eliminated |
| Episode 21 (Tuesday, Nov 24, 2015) | Gwen Stefani | 2 | Korin Bukowski | "She Will Be Loved" | Instant Save |

Non-competition performances
| Order | Performer | Song |
|---|---|---|
| 20.1 | Pharrell Williams | "Freedom" |
| 21.1 | Brad Paisley | "Country Nation" |
| 21.2 | Gwen Stefani and her team (Braiden Sunshine, Jeffery Austin, and Korin Bukowski) | "You Get What You Give" |
| 21.3 | Adam Levine and his team (Amy Vachal, Jordan Smith, and Shelby Brown) | "Wouldn't It Be Nice" |

=== Week 4: Top 10 (Nov. 30 & Dec. 1) ===
iTunes bonus multipliers were awarded to Smith (#2), Barrett Baber (#3), Madi Davis (#4), Ann Roberts (#5), Austin (#7), Amy Vachal (#8) and Shelby Brown (#10).

| Episode | Coach | Order | Artist | Song | Result |
|---|---|---|---|---|---|
| Episode 22 (Monday, Nov 30, 2015) | Gwen Stefani | 1 | Jeffery Austin | "Jealous" | Public's vote |
| Episode 22 (Monday, Nov 30, 2015) | Blake Shelton | 2 | Emily Ann Roberts | "She's Got You" | Public's vote |
| Episode 22 (Monday, Nov 30, 2015) | Gwen Stefani | 3 | Braiden Sunshine | "Radioactive" | Bottom two |
| Episode 22 (Monday, Nov 30, 2015) | Adam Levine | 4 | Shelby Brown | "Go Rest High on That Mountain" | Public's vote |
| Episode 22 (Monday, Nov 30, 2015) | Gwen Stefani | 5 | Korin Bukowski | "Same Old Love" | Bottom two |
| Episode 22 (Monday, Nov 30, 2015) | Adam Levine | 6 | Amy Vachal | "Bye Bye Bye" | Public's vote |
| Episode 22 (Monday, Nov 30, 2015) | Adam Levine | 7 | Jordan Smith | "Hallelujah" | Public's vote |
| Episode 22 (Monday, Nov 30, 2015) | Blake Shelton | 8 | Zach Seabaugh | "Crazy Little Thing Called Love" | Public's vote |
| Episode 22 (Monday, Nov 30, 2015) | Pharrell Williams | 9 | Madi Davis | "Girls Just Want to Have Fun" | Public's vote |
| Episode 22 (Monday, Nov 30, 2015) | Blake Shelton | 10 | Barrett Baber | "I'd Love to Lay You Down" | Public's vote |
| Episode 23 (Tuesday, Dec 1, 2015) | Instant Save performances | | | | |
| Episode 23 (Tuesday, Dec 1, 2015) | Gwen Stefani | 1 | Korin Bukowski | "Try" | Eliminated |
| Episode 23 (Tuesday, Dec 1, 2015) | Gwen Stefani | 2 | Braiden Sunshine | "Harder to Breathe" | Instant Save |

Non-competition performances
| Order | Performer | Song |
|---|---|---|
| 22.1 | Gwen Stefani | "Used to Love You" |
| 23.1 | R. City & Adam Levine | "Locked Away" |
| 23.2 | Sia | "Alive" |

=== Week 5: Semifinals (Dec. 7 & 8) ===
Five artists were eliminated on the semifinals. During the results, the top three artists with the most votes were immediately advanced the finals, the bottom three artists with the fewest votes were eliminated immediately, and the middle three artists were eligible for the Instant Save.

iTunes bonus multipliers were awarded for the most number of artists (eight, surpassing seven on the previous week) in a single week of shows in The Voice history, those being Smith (#1), Austin (#3), Ann Roberts (#4), Davis (#5), Vachal (#6), Braiden Sunshine (#7), Zach Seabaugh (#8) and Barrett Baber (#9). With the elimination of Davis, Williams no longer has any more artists left on his team.

| Episode | Coach | Order | Artist | Song | Result |
Episode 24 (Monday, Dec 7, 2015)
| Episode 24 (Monday, Dec 7, 2015) | Blake Shelton | 1 | Barrett Baber | "Ghost" | Public's vote |
| Episode 24 (Monday, Dec 7, 2015) | Adam Levine | 2 | Shelby Brown | "Even God Must Get the Blues" | Eliminated |
| Episode 24 (Monday, Dec 7, 2015) | Gwen Stefani | 3 | Jeffery Austin | "Believe" | Middle three |
| Episode 24 (Monday, Dec 7, 2015) | Gwen Stefani | 4 | Braiden Sunshine | "Amazing Grace" | Eliminated |
| Episode 24 (Monday, Dec 7, 2015) | Blake Shelton | 5 | Zach Seabaugh | "The Climb" | Middle three |
| Episode 24 (Monday, Dec 7, 2015) | Pharrell Williams | 6 | Madi Davis | "Big Girls Don't Cry" | Middle three |
| Episode 24 (Monday, Dec 7, 2015) | Blake Shelton | 7 | Emily Ann Roberts | "9 to 5" | Public's vote |
| Episode 24 (Monday, Dec 7, 2015) | Adam Levine | 8 | Amy Vachal | "To Make You Feel My Love" | Eliminated |
| Episode 24 (Monday, Dec 7, 2015) | Adam Levine | 9 | Jordan Smith | "Somebody to Love" | Public's vote |
| Episode 25 (Tuesday, Dec 8, 2015) | Instant Save performances | | | | |
| Episode 25 (Tuesday, Dec 8, 2015) | Blake Shelton | 1 | Zach Seabaugh | "Live Like You Were Dying" | Eliminated |
| Episode 25 (Tuesday, Dec 8, 2015) | Pharrell Williams | 2 | Madi Davis | "Don't Dream It's Over" | Eliminated |
| Episode 25 (Tuesday, Dec 8, 2015) | Gwen Stefani | 3 | Jeffery Austin | "Make It Rain" | Instant Save |

Non-competition performances
| Order | Performer | Song |
|---|---|---|
| 24.1 | Ellie Goulding | "On My Mind" |
| 24.2 | Blake Shelton | "Gonna" |
| 25.1 | Cassadee Pope | "I Am Invincible" |
| 25.2 | Dolly Parton | "Coat of Many Colors" |

=== Week 6: Finale (Dec. 14 & 15) ===
The Final four performed on Monday, December 14, 2015, with the final results following on Tuesday, December 15, 2015. Finalists performed a solo song, a duet with their coach, and a Christmas song. As per usual, no iTunes bonuses are awarded for Finale performances, with all season's iTunes votes for each artist counted cumulatively.

The contestant's song choices reach the top 10 on iTunes for Jordan Smith (#1, #3 and #5), Emily Ann Roberts (#2 and #6), Barrett Baber (#7), Jeffery Austin (#9).

| Coach | Artist | Order | Solo Song | Order | Duet Song (With coach) | Order | Christmas Song | Result |
|---|---|---|---|---|---|---|---|---|
| Adam Levine | Jordan Smith | 1 | "Climb Ev'ry Mountain" | 5 | "God Only Knows" | 11 | "Mary Did You Know" | Winner |
| Blake Shelton | Emily Ann Roberts | 12 | "Burning House" | 7 | "Islands in the Stream" | 2 | "Blue Christmas" | Runner Up |
| Blake Shelton | Barrett Baber | 6 | "Die a Happy Man" | 3 | "Rhinestone Cowboy" | 9 | "Silent Night" | Third place |
| Gwen Stefani | Jeffery Austin | 8 | "Stay" | 10 | "Leather and Lace" | 4 | "O Holy Night" | Fourth place |

Non-competition performances
| Order | Performer | Song |
|---|---|---|
| 27.1 | Top 24 (minus Ellie Lawrence) | "Lean On" |
| 27.2 | Barrett Baber (with Zach Seabaugh) | "Forever and Ever, Amen" |
| 27.3 | Coldplay | "Adventure of a Lifetime" |
| 27.4 | Celeste Betton, Darius Scott, Mark Hood, Nadjah Nicole and Regina Love | "Love Train" |
| 27.5 | Ricky Skaggs and Emily Ann Roberts | "Country Boy" |
| 27.6 | Jeffery Austin (with Madi Davis) | "Tears Dry on Their Own" |
| 27.7 | Missy Elliott and Pharrell Williams | "WTF (Where They From)" |
| 27.8 | Usher and Jordan Smith | "Without You" |
| 27.9 | Sam Hunt | "Break Up in a Small Town" |
| 27.10 | Tori Kelly and Jeffery Austin | "Hollow" |
| 27.11 | Wynonna and Barrett Baber | "No One Else on Earth" |
| 27.12 | The Weeknd | "The Hills" / "Earned It" / "Can't Feel My Face" |
| 27.13 | Jordan Smith (with Amy Vachal, Evan McKeel, Korin Bukowski, Mark Hood and Regina Love) | "Any Way You Want It" |
| 27.14 | Emily Ann Roberts (with Ivonne Acero, Morgan Frazier, Nadjah Nicole, Riley Biederer and Shelby Brown) | "Summer Nights" |
| 27.15 | Justin Bieber | "Sorry" |
| 27.16 | Jordan Smith (winner) | "Climb Ev'ry Mountain" |

== Elimination chart ==
=== Overall ===
Color key
Artist's info

- Team Adam
- Team Gwen
- Team Pharrell
- Team Blake

Result details

- Winner
- Runner-up
- Third place
- Fourth place
- Artist was saved by Instant Save (via Twitter)
- Artist was saved by the public's votes
- Artist was saved by his/her coach
- Eliminated

Live show results per week
| Artist | Week 1 Playoffs | Week 2 | Week 3 | Week 4 | Week 5 | Week 6 Finale |
|---|---|---|---|---|---|---|
| Jordan Smith | Safe | Safe | Safe | Safe | Safe | Winner |
| Emily Ann Roberts | Safe | Safe | Safe | Safe | Safe | Runner-up |
| Barrett Baber | Safe | Safe | Safe | Safe | Safe | 3rd place |
| Jeffery Austin | Safe | Safe | Safe | Safe | Safe | 4th place |
| Zach Seabaugh | Safe | Safe | Safe | Safe | Eliminated | Eliminated (Week 5) |
| Madi Davis | Safe | Safe | Safe | Safe | Eliminated | Eliminated (Week 5) |
| Amy Vachal | Safe | Safe | Safe | Safe | Eliminated | Eliminated (Week 5) |
| Shelby Brown | Safe | Safe | Safe | Safe | Eliminated | Eliminated (Week 5) |
| Braiden Sunshine | Safe | Safe | Safe | Safe | Eliminated | Eliminated (Week 5) |
| Korin Bukowski | Safe | Safe | Safe | Eliminated | Eliminated (Week 4) | |
| Evan McKeel | Safe | Safe | Eliminated | Eliminated (Week 3) | | |
| Mark Hood | Safe | Eliminated | Eliminated (Week 2) | | | |
| Ivonne Acero | Eliminated | Eliminated (Week 1) | | | | |
| Celeste Betton | Eliminated | Eliminated (Week 1) | | | | |
| Riley Biederer | Eliminated | Eliminated (Week 1) | | | | |
| Morgan Frazier | Eliminated | Eliminated (Week 1) | | | | |
| Viktor Király | Eliminated | Eliminated (Week 1) | | | | |
| Ellie Lawrence | Eliminated | Eliminated (Week 1) | | | | |
| Regina Love | Eliminated | Eliminated (Week 1) | | | | |
| Blaine Mitchell | Eliminated | Eliminated (Week 1) | | | | |
| Nadjah Nicole | Eliminated | Eliminated (Week 1) | | | | |
| Chance Peña | Eliminated | Eliminated (Week 1) | | | | |
| Darius Scott | Eliminated | Eliminated (Week 1) | | | | |
| Keith Semple | Eliminated | Eliminated (Week 1) | | | | |

=== Team ===
Color key
Artist's info

- Team Adam
- Team Gwen
- Team Pharrell
- Team Blake

Result details

- Winner
- Runner-up
- Third place
- Fourth place
- Eliminated
- Artist Saved by Instant Save (via Twitter)
- Artist reached the Top 10 on iTunes & received the iTunes bonus
- Number of iTunes bonuses received
- Teams are in 3 artists
- No artists remaining on his/her team

| Artist | Week 1 Playoffs | Week 2 | Week 3 | Week 4 | Week 5 | Week 6 Finale |
|---|---|---|---|---|---|---|
| Jordan Smith | Public's vote | Advanced | Advanced | Advanced | Advanced | Winner |
| Amy Vachal | Coach's choice | Advanced | Advanced | Advanced | Eliminated | |
| Shelby Brown | Public's vote | Advanced | Advanced | Advanced | Eliminated | |
| Blaine Mitchell | Eliminated | | | | | |
| Chance Peña | Eliminated | | | | | |
| Keith Semple | Eliminated | | | | | |
| Jeffery Austin | Public's Vote | Advanced | Advanced | Advanced | Advanced | Fourth place |
| Braiden Sunshine | Public's vote | Advanced | Advanced | Advanced | Eliminated | |
| Korin Bukowski | Coach's choice | Advanced | Advanced | Eliminated | | |
| Viktor Király | Eliminated | | | | | |
| Ellie Lawrence | Eliminated | | | | | |
| Regina Love | Eliminated | | | | | |
| Madi Davis | Public's vote | Advanced | Advanced | Advanced | Eliminated | |
| Evan McKeel | Public's vote | Advanced | Eliminated | | | |
| Mark Hood | Coach's choice | Eliminated | | | | |
| Celeste Betton | Eliminated | | | | | |
| Riley Biederer | Eliminated | | | | | |
| Darius Scott | Eliminated | | | | | |
| Emily Ann Roberts | Coach's choice | Advanced | Advanced | Advanced | Advanced | Runner-up |
| Barrett Baber | Public's vote | Advanced | Advanced | Advanced | Advanced | Third place |
| Zach Seabaugh | Public's vote | Advanced | Advanced | Advanced | Eliminated | |
| Ivonne Acero | Eliminated | | | | | |
| Morgan Frazier | Eliminated | | | | | |
| Nadjah Nicole | Eliminated | | | | | |

| Rank | Coach | Top 12 | Top 11 | Top 10 | Top 9 | Top 6 | Top 4 |
|---|---|---|---|---|---|---|---|
| 1 | Adam Levine | 3 | 3 | 3 | 3 | 1 | 1 |
| 2 | Blake Shelton | 3 | 3 | 3 | 3 | 3 | 2 |
| 3 | Gwen Stefani | 3 | 3 | 3 | 2 | 1 | 1 |
| 4 | Pharrell Williams | 3 | 2 | 1 | 1 | 1 | 0 |

== Performances by guests/coaches ==
| Episode | Show segment | Performer | Single | Reaction | | Performance type | Source |
| Episode | Show segment | Performer | Single | Hot 100 | Hot digital | Performance type | Source |
|---|---|---|---|---|---|---|---|
| 17 | The Live Playoffs Results | Sawyer Fredericks | "Take It All" | —N/a | —N/a | live performance | |
| 20 | The Top 11 Performances | Pharrell Williams | "Freedom" | —N/a | —N/a | live performance | |
| 21 | The Top 11 Results | Brad Paisley | "Country Nation" | —N/a | —N/a | live performance | |
| 22 | The Top 10 Performances | Gwen Stefani | "Used to Love You" | —N/a | —N/a | live performance | |
| 23 | The Top 10 Results | R. City & Adam Levine | "Locked Away" | —N/a | —N/a | live performance | |
| 23 | The Top 10 Results | Sia | "Alive" | —N/a | —N/a | live performance | |

== Ratings ==
The season nine premiere was watched by 12.37 million viewers with a 3.5 rating in the 18–49 demographic. It was down from last season's premiere by .48 million viewers.

| Episode | | Original airdate | Production | Time slot (ET) | Viewers (in millions) | Adults (18–49) | | Source |
| Episode | | Original airdate | Production | Time slot (ET) | Viewers (in millions) | Rating | Share | Source |
|---|---|---|---|---|---|---|---|---|
| 1 | "The Blind Auditions Premiere, Part 1" | September 21, 2015 | 901 | Monday 8:00 p.m. | 12.37 | 3.5 | 11 | |
| 2 | "The Blind Auditions Premiere, Part 2" | September 22, 2015 | 902 | Tuesday 8:00 p.m. | 12.34 | 3.5 | 11 | |
| 3 | "The Blind Auditions, Part 3" | September 28, 2015 | 903 | Monday 8:00 p.m. | 12.09 | 3.4 | 10 | |
| 4 | "The Blind Auditions, Part 4" | September 29, 2015 | 904 | Tuesday 8:00 p.m. | 13.60 | 3.7 | 12 | |
| 5 | "The Blind Auditions, Part 5" | October 5, 2015 | 905 | Monday 8:00 p.m. | 12.15 | 3.3 | 10 | |
| 6 | "The Best of the Blind Auditions" | October 6, 2015 | 906 | Tuesday 8:00 p.m. | 9.24 | 2.2 | 7 | |
| 7 | "The Battles Premiere, Part 1" | October 12, 2015 | 907 | Monday 8:00 p.m. | 11.72 | 3.2 | 10 | |
| 8 | "The Battles Premiere, Part 2" | October 13, 2015 | 908 | Tuesday 9:00 p.m. | 10.14 | 2.6 | 8 | |
| 9 | "The Battles, Part 3" | October 19, 2015 | 909 | Monday 8:00 p.m. | 11.40 | 3.0 | 9 | |
| 10 | "The Battles, Part 4" | October 20, 2015 | 910 | Tuesday 9:00 p.m. | 11.28 | 2.7 | 8 | |
| 11 | "The Knockouts Premiere, Part 1" | October 26, 2015 | 911 | Monday 8:00 p.m. | 11.88 | 3.1 | 9 | |
| 12 | "The Knockouts Premiere, Part 2" | October 27, 2015 | 912 | Tuesday 9:00 p.m. | 10.23 | 2.6 | 8 | |
| 13 | "The Knockouts, Part 3" | November 2, 2015 | 913 | Monday 8:00 p.m. | 12.06 | 3.3 | 10 | |
| 14 | "Road to the Live Shows" | November 3, 2015 | 914 | Tuesday 9:00 p.m. | 8.22 | 2.0 | 6 | |
| 15 | "The Live Playoffs, Night 1" | November 9, 2015 | 915 | Monday 8:00 p.m. | 12.02 | 3.2 | 10 | |
| 16 | "The Live Playoffs, Night 2" | November 10, 2015 | 916 | Tuesday 8:00 p.m. | 10.86 | 2.7 | 9 | |
| 17 | "The Live Playoffs, Results" | November 11, 2015 | 917 | Wednesday 8:00 p.m. | 10.14 | 2.4 | 8 | |
| 18 | "Live Top 12 Performance" | November 16, 2015 | 918 | Monday 8:00 p.m. | 11.21 | 3.0 | 9 | |
| 19 | "Live Top 12 Results" | November 17, 2015 | 919 | Tuesday 8:00 p.m. | 11.18 | 2.6 | 8 | |
| 20 | "Live Top 11 Performance" | November 23, 2015 | 920 | Monday 8:00 p.m. | 10.29 | 2.6 | 8 | |
| 21 | "Live Top 11 Results" | November 24, 2015 | 921 | Tuesday 8:00 p.m. | 9.97 | 2.1 | 7 | |
| 22 | "Live Top 10 Performance" | November 30, 2015 | 922 | Monday 8:00 p.m. | 12.56 | 2.8 | 9 | |
| 23 | "Live Top 10 Results" | December 1, 2015 | 923 | Tuesday 8:00 p.m. | 12.13 | 2.6 | 9 | |
| 24 | "Live Top 9 Semi-finals Performance" | December 7, 2015 | 924 | Monday 8:00 p.m. | 12.25 | 2.8 | 9 | |
| 25 | "Live Top 9 Semi-finals Results" | December 8, 2015 | 925 | Tuesday 8:00 p.m. | 13.13 | 2.8 | 9 | |
| 26 | "Live Finale Performance" | December 14, 2015 | 926 | Monday 8:00 p.m. | 14.03 | 3.2 | 10 | |
| 27 | "Live Finale Results" | December 15, 2015 | 927 | Tuesday 9:00 p.m. | 12.60 | 2.9 | 9 | |

== Artists' appearances in other media ==
- Darius Scott moved into songwriting, co-writing 9 songs on Chance the Rapper's The Big Day. He was subsequently signed to a record deal with Roc Nation, releasing his album 004DAISY under the DIXSON moniker in 2022, and also co-wrote "Be Alive" with Beyoncé for the film King Richard, receiving nominations for a Grammy, Academy Award, and Golden Globe. His written contributions to Beyoncé's Renaissance are currently nominated for Album of the Year at the 65th Annual Grammy Awards.
- Ivonne Acero sang in the blind auditions for season eight, but failed to turn any chairs. She later appeared in the first season of the American-Spanish version of this show, and was eliminated during the battle rounds.
- Manny Cabo later appeared in the first season of the American-Spanish version of this show, but was eliminated in the Live Playoffs.
- Keith Semple lost his "golden ticket" on the ninth season of American Idol due to his legal status and residency considerations and was a winner on Popstars: The Rivals, a British singing competition; consequently, he became a member of the boyband One True Voice (OTV) in 2002.
- Viktor Király previously competed to represent Hungary in the Eurovision Song Contest, an international song contest in Europe, 2 times in 2012 (with his siblings, including another well-known singer in Hungary Linda Király) and 2014, and both times nearly winning the competition. He has also won the 4th season of Megasztár, a show similar to American Idol.
- Caleb Lee Hutchinson who scored no chair turns this season appeared on the 16th season of American Idol and became the runner-up of the competition.
- Jordan Smith appeared on American Song Contest representing Kentucky and finished in 3rd place.
