= Emily Ann Roberts =

American country singer and songwriter (born 1998)

- Born: Emily Ann Roberts; October 23, 1998 (age 28); Knoxville, Tennessee, U.S.
- Genres: Country, gospel
- Occupations: Singer, songwriter
- Instruments: Vocals, guitar
- Years active: 2015–present
- Labels: RECORDS; Sony Music Nashville; Republic; Starstruck Entertainment

Emily Ann Roberts (born October 23, 1998) is an American country singer and songwriter. She was a contestant on NBC's The Voice, as a member of team Blake Shelton, and she became a finalist on season 9. Songs she performed on the show charted on the Billboard magazine charts, where three songs were on the Hot Country Songs and one placed on the Hot Christian Songs chart. After the show, she finished school before focusing on her music career.

In 2018, she released her first single "Stuck on Me and You," which charted in the top 40 on iTunes. On May 14, 2019, Roberts returned to The Voice stage to perform her latest single "Someday Dream". Her debut album, Can't Hide Country, was released on September 22, 2023.

== Early and personal life ==
Emily Ann Roberts was born on October 23, 1998, in Knoxville, Tennessee, to Tommy and Kelly Roberts. She has an older sister named Abby, who graduated from Karns High School, in Karns, Tennessee, in 2015. On November 7, 2020, she married high school boyfriend Chris Sasser.

== Career ==
=== The Voice ===
Roberts' music career started in 2015, with her appearance on season 9 of NBC's The Voice, where she got a two chair turn during the auditions, when she chose to be part of Blake Shelton's team on the show. Her renditions of the songs, "Blame It on Your Heart", "Why Not Me", and "She's Got You", during show, charted on the Billboard magazine chart, where they placed at No. 43, No. 33, and No. 21 respectively on the Hot Country Songs chart. She performed, "In the Garden", on the program, where it placed at No. 14 on the Hot Christian Songs chart.

Roberts finished in second place on the finale to Jordan Smith from Team Adam.

Episode	Song	Original Artist	Order	Results
Blind Auditions (September 22)	"I Hope You Dance"	Lee Ann Womack & Sons of the Desert	2.8	Adam Levine and Blake Shelton turned Joined Team Blake
Battle Rounds – Top 48 (October 20)	"I'm That Kind of Girl" (vs. Morgan Frazier)	Patty Loveless	10.6	Saved by Coach
Knockout Rounds – Top 32 (November 2)	"Cowboy Take Me Away" (vs. Nadjah Nicole)	The Chicks	13.4	Saved by Coach
Live Playoffs – Top 24 (November 10)	"In the Garden"	C. Austin Miles	16.10	Saved by Coach
Live Top 12 (November 16)	"Blame It on Your Heart"	Patty Loveless	18.4	Saved by Public Vote
Live Top 11 (November 23)	"Why Not Me"	The Judds	20.10	Saved by Public Vote
Live Top 10 (November 30)	"She's Got You"	Patsy Cline	22.2	Saved by Public Vote
Semi-finals – Top 9 (December 7)	"9 to 5"	Dolly Parton	24.7	Saved by Public Vote
Finale (December 14)	"Burning House"	Cam	26.12	Runner-up
Finale (December 14)	"Islands in the Stream" (with Blake Shelton)	Kenny Rogers and Dolly Parton	26.7	Runner-up
Finale (December 14)	"Blue Christmas"	Elvis Presley	26.2	Runner-up

Non-competition performances
Round	Order	Collaborator(s)	Song	Original artist
The Live Playoffs Result	17.3	Barrett Baber, Nadjah Nicole, Zach Seabaugh, Morgan Frazier, Ivonne Acero	"Stand"	Rascal Flatts
The Top 12 Result	19.1	Barrett Baber and Zach Seabaugh	"Lean On Me"	Bill Withers
The Finale Result	27.14	Ivonne Acero, Morgan Frazier, Nadjah Nicole, Riley Biederer, and Shelby Brown	"Summer Nights”	Rascal Flatts

=== After The Voice ===
After the show she returned to school for the rest of her junior year. She took online night classes and graduated in May 2016, and started working full-time in Nashville in June. An opportunity opened in 2017 to be on a gospel tour called "The Gospel Through Girls & Guitars" which led to Emily Ann Roberts' first gospel album titled "Bigger Than Me" in August 2017. She continued to play and sell out all her live shows ending 2017 very strong. In 2018 Starstruck Records signed her and in September "Stuck On Me + You" was released as her first country music single. A second single, "I Got Forever," was released the following month. November saw the release of a third single "Your Christmas Eve". A full album is expected for a 2019 release. April saw a fifth single "Someday Dream" released. In May The Voice asked her back to perform her new single on the show.

In 2024, Roberts both covered the song "Try Everything" and provided the voice of Trixie for the reimagined Country Bear Musical Jamboree attraction at Walt Disney World's Magic Kingdom.

In 2025, Roberts signed a record deal with RECORDS/Sony Music Nashville.

== Discography ==
=== Albums ===
Title	Album details	Peak chart positions			Sales
Title	Album details	US	US Indie	CAN	Sales
Bigger Than Me	Released: August 2017; Label: Format: CD	—	—	—	
Someday Dream (EP)	Released: July 12, 2019; Label: Starstruck Records; Format: Digital downloads	—	47	—	
Can't Hide Country	Released: September 22, 2023; Label: Starstruck Records; Format: Digital downloads	—	—	—	
Memory Lane (EP)	Released: October 3, 2025; Label: Sony Music Nashville; Format: Digital downloads	—	—	—	
"—" denotes releases that did not chart

=== Albums ===
Title	Album details	Peak chart positions			Sales
Title	Album details	US	US Indie	CAN	Sales
The Voice: The Complete Season 9 Collection	Released: December 15, 2015; Label: Republic Records; Format: Digital download	43	—	99	
"—" denotes releases that did not chart

==== Singles ====
Year	Title	Peak chart positions				Debut week sales
Year	Title	US Country	US	US Christ	CAN	Debut week sales
2015	"In the Garden"	34	—	3	—	US: 21,000
2015	"Blame It on Your Heart"	43	—	—	—	US: 10,000
2015	"Why Not Me"	33	—	—	—	US: 21,000
2015	"She's Got You"	21	103	—	—	US: 41,000
2015	"9 to 5"	25	119	—	—	US: 35,000
2015	"Burning House"	4	56	—	99	US: 83,000
2015	"Islands in the Stream" (with Blake Shelton)	19	101	—	—	
2015	"Blue Christmas"	34	—	—	—	
"—" denotes releases that did not chart

=== Theme parks ===
Year	Title	Role	Note
2024	Country Bear Musical Jamboree	Trixie	

== Awards and nominations ==
Year	Association	Category	Nominated work	Result	Ref.
2026	Academy of Country Music Awards	New Female Artist of the Year	Herself	Nominated	
2026	Country Music Association Awards	New Artist of the Year	Herself	Pending	
