= Tyler Dickerson =

American singer-songwriter

- Born: 1993 (age 32–33); Hattiesburg, Mississippi, U.S.
- Genre: Country
- Occupation: Singer
- Instrument: Vocals
- Years active: early 2000s-present
- Label: Lyric Street
- Member of: Rockin Rouge

Tyler Dickerson (born 1993 in Hattiesburg, Mississippi) is an American country music artist signed to Lyric Street Records. He released his debut single, "Tell Your Sister I'm Single," to radio in early 2010.

== Biography ==
Tyler Dickerson was born in Hattiesburg, Mississippi to Steven and Crystal Dickerson. He began performing at an early age, and by eleven he had started performing at venues in Florida. In 2005, he won Florida Male Vocalist and Male Entertainer of the Year awards for his age group. He had also become a regular performer at Tootsie's Orchid Lounge in Nashville, Tennessee.

Dickerson signed to a recording contract with Lyric Street Records in late 2009 after entering a talent search associated with John Rich of Big & Rich, who also mentored him. He released his first single, "Tell Your Sister I'm Single," in February 2010. The song is written by Amanda Williams, Trevor Rosen, and Isaac Rich (brother of John Rich). Dickerson also signed on as an opening act for Brooks & Dunn's Last Rodeo Tour. Bobby Peacock of Roughstock gave the song a positive review, saying that Dickerson "clearly plays the premise for laughs." "Tell Your Sister I'm Single" debuted at number 51 on the Billboard Hot Country Songs charts dated for the week ending March 13, 2010.

Dickerson now sings in the Louisiana-based band Rockin Rouge.

Dickerson auditioned for The Voice on September 28, 2015. He performed "Hard to Handle," and was chosen by Blake Shelton (the only one who turned his chair) to be on his team. He was eliminated from the show in the top 48, after losing to Zach Seabaugh on a performance of Travis Tritt's "I'm Gonna Be Somebody."

Stage	Song	Original Artist	Date	Order	Result
Blind Audition	"Hard to Handle"	Otis Redding	September 28, 2015	3.13	Blake Shelton turned Defaulted to Team Blake
The Battles (Top 48)	"I'm Gonna Be Somebody" (vs. Zach Seabaugh)	Travis Tritt	October 12, 2015	7.2	Defeated

== Discography ==
=== Singles ===
Year	Single	Peak positions
Year	Single	US Country
2010	"Tell Your Sister I'm Single"	47
"—" denotes releases that did not chart
