= Madi Davis =

American singer-songwriter

- Born: Madi Anne Davis; January 23, 1999 (age 27); McKinney, Texas, U.S.
- Genre: Pop
- Occupations: Singer, songwriter
- Instruments: Vocals, guitar, piano
- Years active: 2015–present
- Label: Republic
- Website: madiannedavis.com

Madi Anne Davis (born January 23, 1999) is an American singer-songwriter, who was a contestant on NBC's The Voice. She was a semi-finalist season nine and the longest-standing member of team Pharrell Williams. Her song, "Girls Just Want to Have Fun", performed on the show, charted on the Billboard magazine Hot 100 chart.

== Early and personal life ==
Madi Anne Davis was born on January 23, 1999, in McKinney, Texas.

== Music career ==
=== The Voice (Jun–Dec 2015) ===
Her music career started in 2015, with her appearance on season nine of NBC's The Voice, where she got a two chair turn during the auditions, when she chose to be part of Pharrell Williams's team on the show. Her rendition, "Girls Just Want to Have Fun", charted on the Billboard magazine Hot 100 chart, at No. 98.

– Studio version of performance reached the top 10 on iTunes

Stage	Song	Original Artist	Date	Order	Result
Blind Audition	"It's Too Late"	Carole King	September 28, 2015	3.7	Gwen Stefani and Pharrell Williams turned Joined Team Pharrell
Battle Rounds (Top 48)	"Riptide" (vs. Sydney Rhame)	Vance Joy	October 13, 2015	8.3	Saved by Coach
Knockout Rounds (Top 32)	"A Case of You" (vs. Amy Vachal)	Joni Mitchell	October 26, 2015	11.4	Saved by Coach
Live Playoffs (Top 24)	"Songbird"	Fleetwood Mac	November 10, 2015	16.5	Saved by Public Vote
Live Top 12	"Who Will Save Your Soul"	Jewel	November 16, 2015	18.7	Saved by Public Vote
Live Top 11	"Love Is Blindness"	U2	November 23, 2015	20.7	Saved by Public Vote
Live Top 10	"Girls Just Want to Have Fun"	Cyndi Lauper	November 30, 2015	22.9	Saved by Public Vote
Live Semi-finals (Top 9)	"Big Girls Don't Cry"	The Four Seasons	December 7, 2015	24.6	Middle 3
Semi-finals Instant Save	"Don't Dream It's Over"	Crowded House	December 8, 2015	25.2	Eliminated

Non Competition Performances:
Order	Friend	Song
1.74	Riley Biederer; Evan McKeel; Celeste Betton; Mark Hood; Darius Scott	"Everybody Hurts"
1.94	Mark Hood and Evan McKeel	"Just A Cloud Away"
27.6	Jeffery Austin	"Tears Dry on Their Own"
