= Viktor Király =

Hungarian-American singer

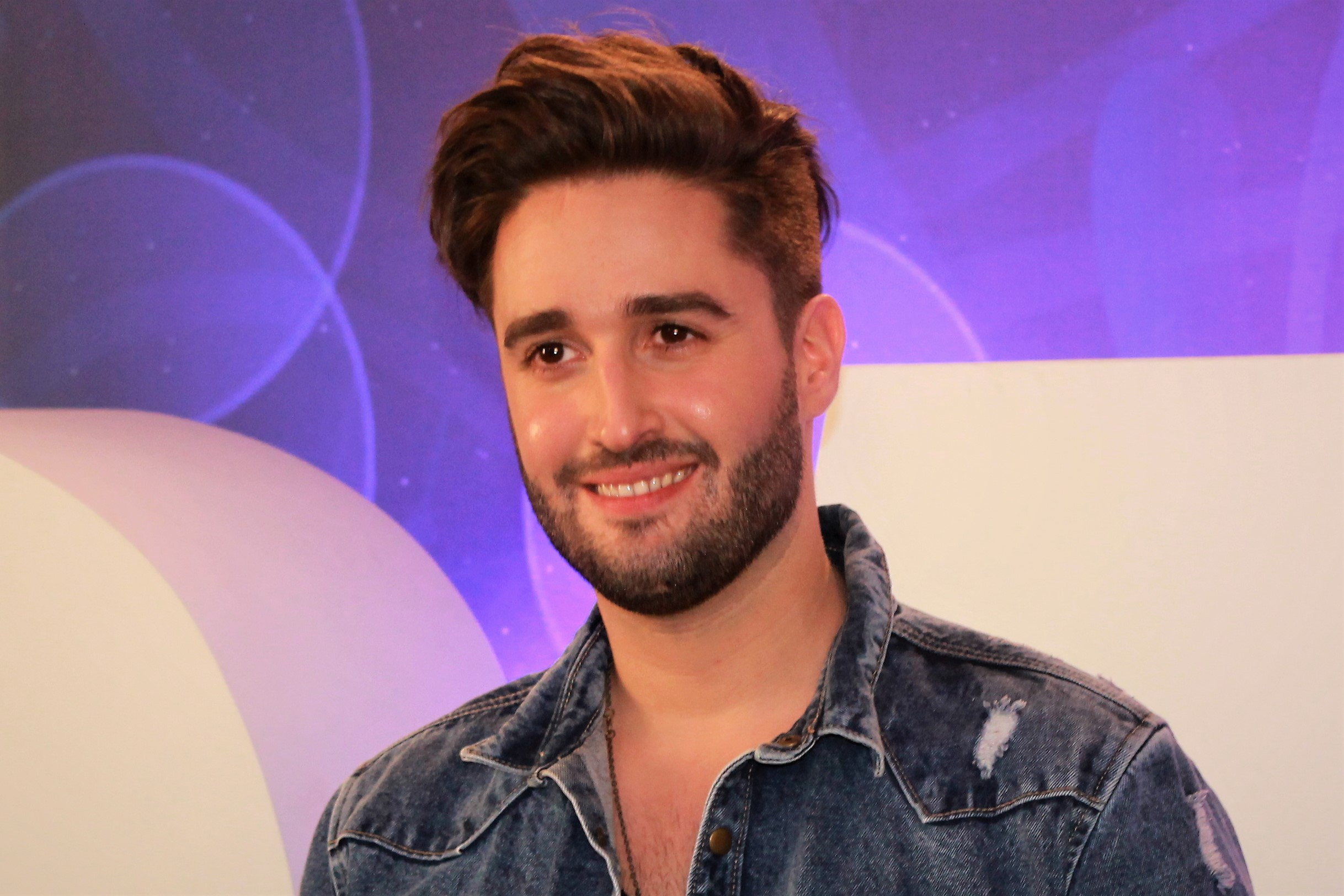
- Király in 2018

Background information
- Born: Dov Viktor Király; March 29, 1984 (age 42); Great Neck, New York, U.S.
- Origin: Budapest, Hungary
- Genres: R&B; soul; pop
- Occupations: Singer; songwriter
- Instrument: Vocals
- Years active: 2008–present
- Labels: King Music; Magneoton-Warner
- Website: www.kiralyviktor.hu

Dov Viktor Király (born March 29, 1984), is a Hungarian-American rapper, singer, and songwriter. In 2006, he was part of the Hungarian band Twinz with his twin brother Benjamin. In 2008, he became the fourth winner of the Hungarian music competition Megasztár. He is the younger brother of the Hungarian-American pop singer Linda Király.

In 2012 and 2014, he took part in A Dal, a selection process in an unsuccessful bid to represent Hungary in the Eurovision Song Contest. In 2015, he took part in season 9 of the American series The Voice, initially as part of Adam Levine's team, and later Gwen Stefani's, but was eliminated on November 11 during the Live Playoffs round, in which the Top 24 competed for the public's vote and coaches' choices.

== Early years ==
Király was born in New York, a son of Hungarian immigrants. His father, Tamás Király, a musician, was the drummer in the band Universal együttes between 1972 and 1982. His mother Gabriella Király (née Gecsényi) sang as a backing vocalist in the band. Growing up in New York, Király played drums in a number of garage bands. After his mother became seriously ill, the family returned to Hungary in 1999, where he continued his musical career.

== In Twinz and Face to Face ==
Viktor started a musical career in Hungary alongside his identical twin brother Benjamin Király forming a Hungarian musical band in 2006 called Twinz. The band released a number of singles, and their single "Aranyásók" had some good airplay in Hungary. The band is active still and is known as Face to Face. Linda Király, Viktor's sister, is also a very well-known Hungarian singer, who had a great number of hits charting many times on the Mahasz Top 40, the Hungarian Singles Chart.

Viktor Király competed as a solo contestant on a show on Hungarian television channel M1. The series titled A Társulat was dedicated to choosing performers for roles in the well-known Hungarian rock opera István, a király (István the King). The language hurdle and his clear American accent in pronouncing the Hungarian language prevented him from moving to the later rounds of the show.

== Megasztár (2008) ==
In 2008, Király won the fourth season of the Hungarian music competition Megasztár, an annual music talent contest on Hungarian television station TV2 based on a Pop Idol and Star Academy format.

Király's performances during the show:

- Top 15: "You Are Not Alone" (Michael Jackson)
- Week 1: "September" (Earth, Wind & Fire)
- Week 2: "When a Man Loves a Woman" (Percy Sledge)
- Week 4: "Hull az elsárgult levél" (Péter Máté) / "I Don't Want to Miss a Thing" (Aerosmith)
- Week 5: "As" as a duet with Magdolna Rúzsa (Stevie Wonder / George Michael & Mary J. Blige) and "Féltelek" as a duet with Tamara Bencsik (Color együttes)
- Week 6: "This Love" (Maroon 5) / "Englishman in New York" (Sting)
- Week 7: "Careless Whisper" (George Michael) / "Billie Jean" (Michael Jackson)
- Week 8: "Santa Claus is Coming to Town" (J. Fred Coots & Haven Gillespie) / "(Where Do I Begin?) Love Story" (theme from Love Story)
- Final:
  - "Don't Stop Me Now" (Queen)
  - "You Are So Beautiful" – duet with Magdolna Rúzsa (Joe Cocker)
  - "Kiss" – duel with Dávid Fekete (Prince)
  - "Éjfél" – duel with Dávid Fekete (from the musical Cats)
  - "Time to Say Goodbye" – duel with Dávid Fekete (Sarah Brightman & Andrea Bocelli)

== Solo career (2009-present) ==
After winning Megasztár, Király launched a solo career with a live album Király Viktor: A döntőben elhangzott dalok released in 2009 containing most of his live performances on Megasztár 4. The album made it to number 4 on MAHASZ Top 40, the official Hungarian Albums Chart. The same year he appeared alongside his sister Linda and brother Benjamin in a T-Mobile sponsored concert by Simply Red. Also in 2009, he released his self-titled studio album Király Viktor. The debut studio album made it to number 9 on MAHASZ Top 40. Two singles from Király Viktor, namely "Forgószél" and "Ha arra indulsz" were successes on MAHASZ and music television station VIVA. An English language version of "Ha arra indulsz" retitled "Have I Told You" with an accompanying music video also gained fame.

The follow-up album was Solo in 2010. The title track "Solo" topped the Hungarian charts, and the follow-up single "Crazy" was also a big hit in Hungary. Later 2012 and 2013 releases included the singles "Move Faster", "Over" and a chart-topping single "Fire". In 2013-2014, Király became a jury member and mentor in the talent program Az ének iskolája for young Hungarian singers between ages 8 and 16. 3rd Dimension was the third studio album for Király and was released in 2014. It reached number 2 on the MAHASZ Top 40 Albums Chart and was certified platinum in Hungary. Two singles have been released from the album: "Chasing Demons" and "Exhale".

== A Dal ==
Király has participated three times in A Dal, the Hungarian national selection show for a bid to represent Hungary in the Eurovision Song Contest.

2012

Király's first attempt was with the song "Untried" as part of the family band Király Testvérek (The Kiralys) during the 2012 contest alongside his twin brother Benjamin and his sister Linda. The Kiralys reached the finals of the qualification finishing fourth overall. Compact Disco went on to win the public vote and represented Hungary at the Eurovision Song Contest 2012.

2014

Király attempted A Dal for the second time in 2014 as a solo artist, with the song "Running Out of Time" co-written by Király himself, his father Tamás Király and by Diamond Duggal known as DJ Swami. Reaching the finals, the song was selected in Top 4 by the four-member jury, but the public vote opted for András Kállay-Saunders to represent Hungary in Eurovision 2014. The single "Running Out of Time" made it to number 3 on the MAHASZ Top 40. Due to the success of Király's song, he re-recorded it in a new version featuring American musician Darryl McDaniels, also known as D.M.C.

2018

Király was announced as one of the participants in A Dal 2018, with the song "Budapest Girl". He reached the superfinal.

== U.S. The Voice (2015) ==
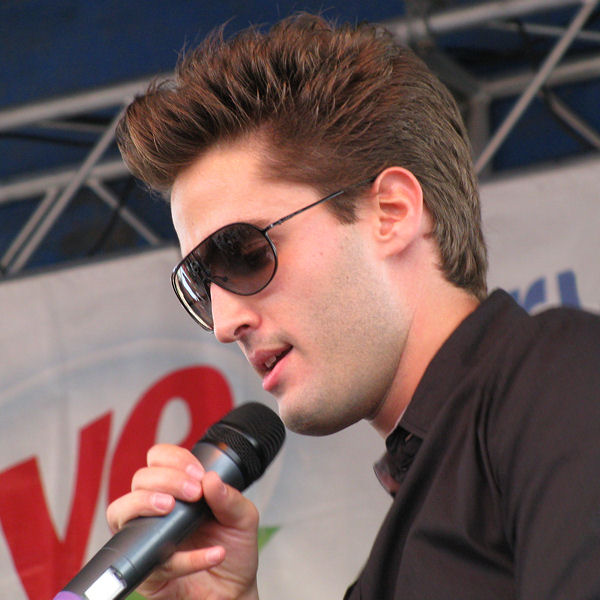
Viktor Király in 2009

In 2015, Király auditioned for season 9 of the American series of the reality talent show The Voice broadcast on NBC. In the fourth episode of the "Blind Auditions" of the program broadcast on September 29, 2015, he sang "What's Going On" by Marvin Gaye with all four coaches, Adam Levine, Blake Shelton, Pharrell Williams, and Gwen Stefani, turning their chairs. Király chose to be on Team Adam. In the Battle Round, he was paired against Cassandra Robertson with the song "Nobody Knows". Király was chosen by Levine as the winner.

During the Knockout Rounds, Király was stolen by Stefani after Levine chose Jordan Smith as the winner of their knockout round. In the first live round (also known as the Live Playoffs, consisting of 24 finalists with six artists from each team), Király failed to get the Top 2 Public Vote save for Team Gwen and was not saved by Stefani as a coach's choice. Therefore, he left the competition on November 11, 2015, sparking criticism from critics and fans alike.

Stage	Song	Original Artist	Date	Order	Result
Blind Audition	"What's Going On?"	Marvin Gaye	September 29, 2015	4.6	All four chairs turned Joined Team Adam
The Battles (Top 48)	"Nobody Knows" (vs. Cassandra Robertson)	Tony Rich	October 19, 2015	9.2	Saved by Coach
The Knockouts (Top 32)	"If I Ain't Got You" (vs. Jordan Smith)	Alicia Keys	October 26, 2015	11.6	Defeated; Stolen by Gwen Stefani
Live Playoffs (Top 24)	"All Around the World"	Lisa Stansfield	November 9, 2015	15.10	Eliminated

Non Competition Performances:

Order	Friend	Song
1.71	Regina Love; Braiden Sunshine; Korin Bukowski; Jeffery Austin; Ellie Lawrence	"O-o-h Child"

== Discography ==
=== Albums ===
Studio albums

Year	Album	Peak positions
Year	Album	MAHASZ Top 40
2009	Király Viktor	9
2010	Solo	34
2014	3rd Dimension	2

Live albums

Year	Album	Peak positions
Year	Album	MAHASZ Top 40
2009	Király Viktor: A döntőben elhangzott dalok	4

=== Singles ===
Year	Song	Peak positions		Album
Year	Song	MAHASZ Top 40	VIVA Chart	Album
2009	"Forgószél"	28	1	Király Viktor
2009	"Ha arra indulsz / Have I Told You"	–	4	Király Viktor
2010	"Solo"	1	1	Solo
2011	"Crazy"	–	2	Solo
2012	"Move Faster" (No!End & B-Sensual feat. Viktor Király & Linda Király)	–	12	
2012	"Over"	10	5	
2013	"Fire"	1	5	
2014	"Running Out of Time"	3	1	Sung during A Dal
2014	"Álmodd meg a csodát!"	7	–	
2015	"Chasing Demons"	7	–	3rd Dimension
2015	"Exhale / Légzés"	–	–	3rd Dimension

Others

- 2012: "Untried" (credited as The Királys) (from A Dal)
- 2014: "Running Out of Time" (feat. D.M.C.)
- 2015: The Voice performance releases on iTunes:
  - "What's Going On"
  - "Nobody Knows" (with Cassandra Robertson)
  - "If I Ain't Got You"
  - "All Around the World"

== See also ==
- Hungarian pop
- Linda Király
