= Amy Vachal =

American singer-songwriter (born 1988)

- Born: Amy Lynn Vachal; December 8, 1988 (age 37); New York City, New York
- Genres: Pop, Alternative folk, Blues,
- Occupations: Singer, songwriter
- Instruments: Vocals, guitar
- Years active: 2011–present
- Website: http://www.amyvachal.com

Amy Lynn Vachal (born December 8, 1988) is an American singer-songwriter. She is best known as a semi-finalist on the 9th season of The Voice, where she chose Pharrell Williams as her coach and was later "stolen" by Adam Levine. She had previously released two EPs prior to appearing on The Voice.

== Biography ==
Amy Lynn Vachal was born on December 8, 1988 to an American father, Richard Vachal, and a Filipina mother, Deirdra Vachal, who is a daughter of Filipino politician, former congressman, and Governor of Cebu, Pablo P. Garcia and Judge Esperanza Fiel-Garcia. She has one older brother, Jake Vachal. Growing up, Vachal's love for singing developed into a "secret passion". She graduated from the Rutgers Preparatory School before she pursued a dual degree in economics and studio art at Swarthmore College in Pennsylvania and played both varsity soccer and lacrosse.

After a traumatic head injury from playing lacrosse, Vachal turned to music as she recovered. She started writing songs and performed her first set in New York City at the age of 20 at Arlene's Grocery on the Lower East Side. After finishing college, she sold a few of her paintings to move to New York and started performing in small clubs and cafes such as Rockwood Music Hall, The Living Room, and Caffe Vivaldi. While living in New York, she had several jobs as a voice-over artist, waitress, secretary, barista, and also worked in a bakery and a bar.

== Career ==
=== Early career ===
Vachal's first EP, Appleseed, was released in 2011. She also released a single in 2013, "Catapult". After she was awarded positions in artist-in-residency programs at The Motley Fool in Alexandria, VA and Madrono Ranch in Medina, Texas as a songwriter, she returned to New York City and recorded her second EP entitled Crinkle Bloom, released in 2014, with Ken Rockwood of Rockwood Recordings. Her second EP's songs were written during her first two years in New York. She had also written one song in Medina. She took on more voice-over work for commercial demos, eventually landing a national campaign as the singer for a Kellogg's commercial in 2014.

=== 2015: The Voice ===
Vachal auditioned for the ninth season of The Voice, singing "Dream a Little Dream of Me" for her blind audition. Except for Adam Levine whose team was full, the three other coaches, Gwen Stefani, Pharrell Williams, and Blake Shelton, turned their chairs for her, and she eventually chose Williams as her coach. She advanced to the Knockout rounds, where she was not chosen to advance by Williams. However, Levine and Shelton then opted to steal her, with Vachal choosing Levine as her new coach. Vachal's performances charted consistently, including her version of Drake's Hotline Bling charting at No. 28 on Billboard's Digital Songs chart. A week later, her rendition of Taylor Swift's Blank Space charted at No. 24. She was eliminated in the semi-finals.

==== Chart of The Voice performances ====
Studio version of performance reached the top 10 on iTunes

Stage	Song	Original Artist	Date	Order	Result
Blind Audition	"Dream a Little Dream of Me"	Ozzie Nelson	October 5, 2015	5.7	Gwen Stefani, Pharrell Williams, and Blake Shelton turned; Joined Team Pharrell
Battle Rounds (Top 48)	"To Love Somebody" (vs. Jubal & Amanda)	Bee Gees	October 20, 2015	10.2	Saved by Coach
Knockout Rounds (Top 32)	"A Sunday Kind of Love" (vs. Madi Davis)	Claude Thornhill	October 26, 2015	11.4	Adam and Blake stolen in, she joined Team Adam
Live Playoffs (Top 24)	"The Way You Look Tonight"	Fred Astaire	November 9, 2015	15.9	Saved by Coach
Live Top 12	"Hotline Bling"	Drake	November 16, 2015	18.2	Saved by Public Vote
Live Top 11	"Blank Space"	Taylor Swift	November 23, 2015	20.5	Saved by Public Vote
Live Top 10	"Bye Bye Bye"	'N Sync	November 30, 2015	22.6	Saved by Public Vote
Live Top 9 (Semi-finals)	"To Make You Feel My Love"	Bob Dylan	December 7, 2015	24.8	Eliminated

Non Competition Performances:
Order	Friend	Song
1.75	Shelby Brown; Chance Peña; Blaine Mitchell; Keith Semple; Jordan Smith	"Diamonds"
2.13	Jordan Smith and Shelby Brown	"Wouldn't It Be Nice"
27.13	Jordan Smith, Mark Hood, Evan McKeel, Korin Bukowski, and Regina Love	"Any Way You Want It"

=== Career after The Voice ===
After her elimination from The Voice, Vachal stated that she would be working on her first full-length album soon. She resides in Brooklyn, New York when not on tour as she workshops new material for a prospective release. On March 3, 2017, she released the single "Wait" and on March 28, she appeared on The Tonight Show Starring Jimmy Fallon in the segment 'Battle of the Instant Songwriters'.

== Discography ==
Title	Details	Peak chart positions
Title	Details	US
Appleseeds	Released: April 20, 2011; Track listing: 1. Appleseed; 2. Circle; 3. What Is Love; 4. Catapult	
Crinkle Bloom	Released: November 11, 2014; Track listing: 1. Broke into Words; 2. Honey; 3. Crinkle Bloom; 4. Let the Morning Bring Word; 5. Deep Blue	
Strawberry Moon	Released: 2018; Track listing: 1. Golden Boy; 2. Taken; 3. Honey; 4. Strawberry Moon; 5. Wait; 6. Darling You; 7. Lightning; 8. You Can Have Me; 9. Cashmere; 10. Below My Feet; 11. Stones	

=== Singles ===
Title	Year
"Wait"	2017
