= Amanda Ayala =

American singer

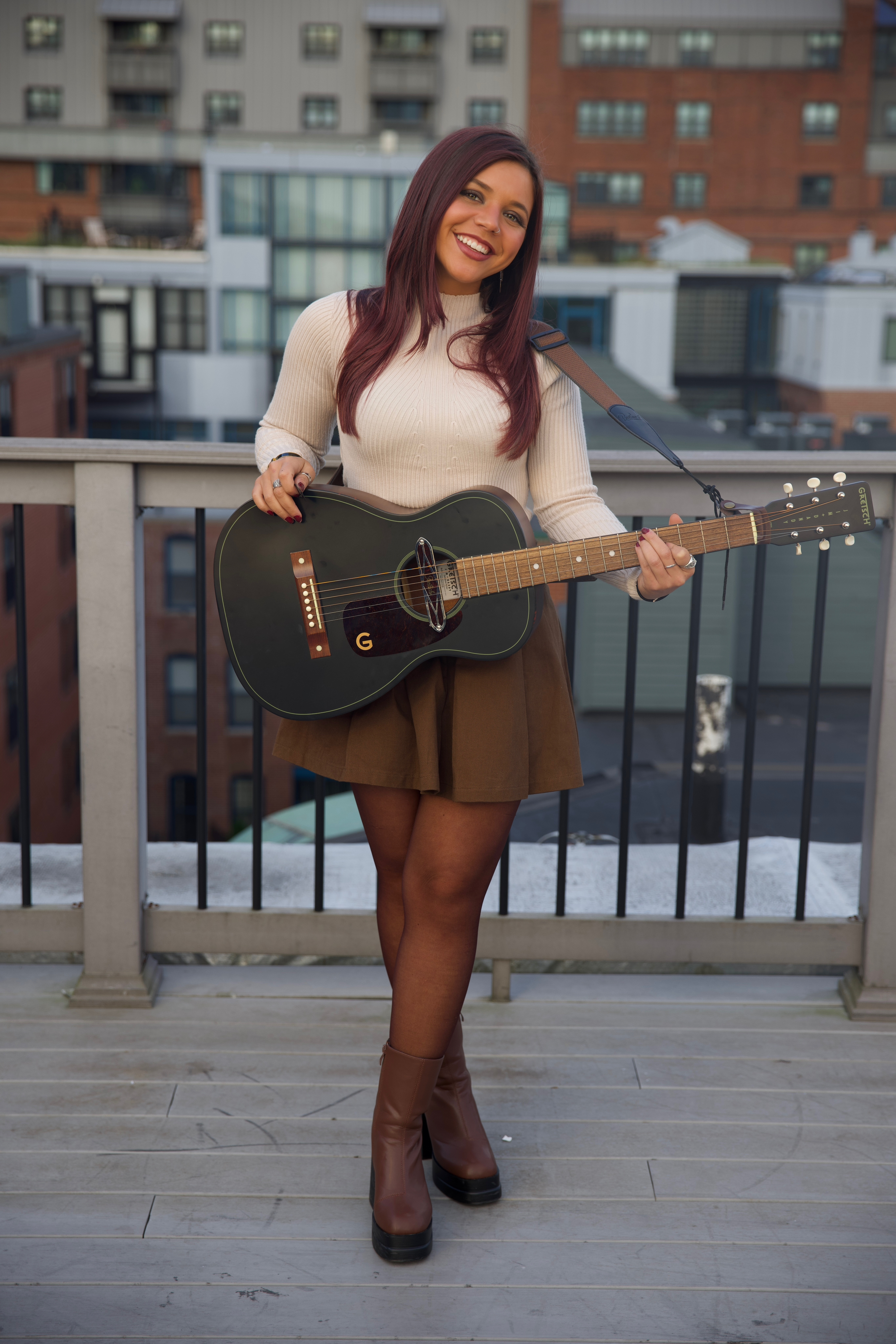
- Amanda Ayala performing at the Ridgefield Playhouse

Background information
- Born: September 23, 1997 (age 28); Yonkers, New York
- Origin: New York
- Genres: Pop, Rock, Alternative
- Occupations: Singer, songwriter, musician
- Years active: 2015–present
- Label: Republic Records (2015)

Amanda Ayala (born September 23, 1997) is an American singer from New York who made her first appearance on the national scene on NBC's Emmy Award-winning show The Voice. Following her time on The Voice she continued her success serving as support for well known artists and through appearances on other television programs such as Who Will Rock You.

Amanda's first performance on The Voice was a rendition of "Mississippi Queen" by Mountain. Three out of the four judges on the panel turned their chairs for Amanda: Pharrell Williams, Blake Shelton and Adam Levine. Ayala chose to join Team Adam where she was mentored by John Fogerty. Amanda also performed a rendition of Edge of Seventeen by Stevie Nicks. Both of Ayala's singles charted on the iTunes Rock Charts. Her performances garnered attention from stars like Brad Paisley and Leslie West via Twitter. Her audition video has over 1.2 million views and counting.

== Early life ==
Ayala began singing at the age of 3 and joined her first rock band at the age of 12. The following year, she and her band performed at New York City's oldest rock club, The Bitter End. As Ayala's voice matured, she founded her own rock band and covered classic rock hits as well as performing a mix of originals throughout the tri-state area before she entered the national scene on television and began opening for other artists.

== Career ==
After The Voice (U.S. TV series), Ayala's band was a winner of Westchester County's Battle of the Bands and chosen to open for the Pleasantville Music Festival on the Capitol Theatre sponsored stage. The headlining acts included Grammy Award-winning artist KT Tunstall, along with the alternative rock band Guster and rock group The Smithereens

Ayala has served as a supporting act for many artists across all genres. Her first experience as support was at The Chance with rock band Blackfoot, followed by a show with Voice finalist Joshua Davis at the Ridgefield Playhouse in Connecticut.

In late 2016, Ayala was the opening act at the Annual Tuckahoe Music Festival which included freestyle acts like Sweet Sensation, Exposé and pop icon Taylor Dayne. Later in the night Taylor Dayne asked Amanda to join her in singing the Billboard number-one hit, "Love Will Lead You Back".

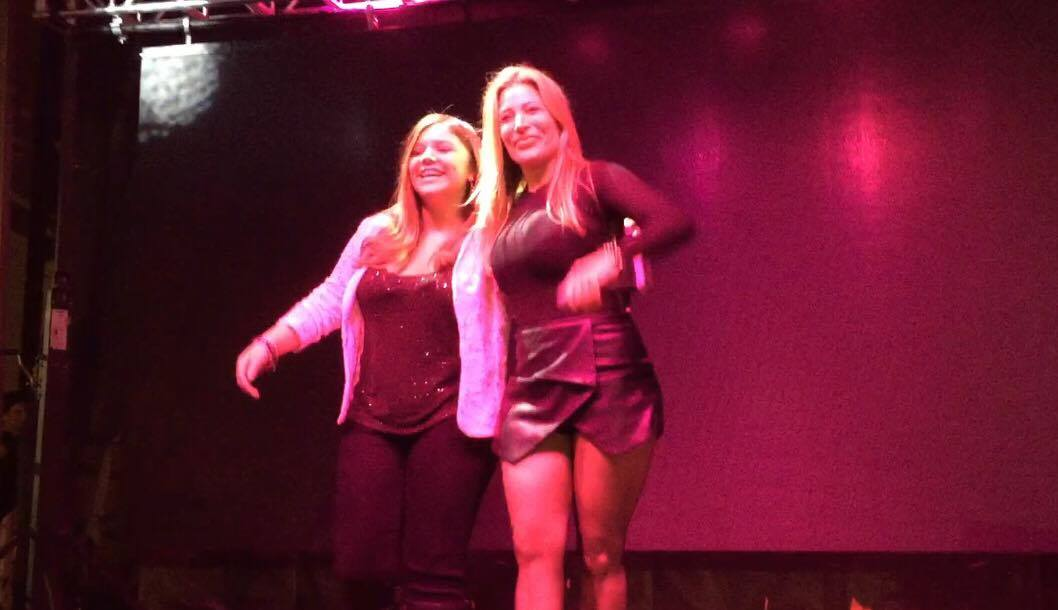
Amanda Ayala performing with Taylor Dayne

Some of Ayala's other shows include her concert with The Partridge Family star David Cassidy. This concert was covered on TMZ due to Mr. Cassidy's outburst towards a fan in the audience. This one of Cassidy's final shows before his retirement.

Ayala was selected to be an opening act for Sebastian Bach, the original voice of Skid Row, at The Chance Theater in Poughkeepsie, New York. The performance garnered some local media attention due to the sold-out attendance. She was also booked as a supporting act for Tony Harnell of TNT in the weeks that followed (Harnell was also the lead singer of Skid Row in 2015).

She supported American Idol winner Nick Fradiani at the Ridgefield Playhouse in Ridgefield, Connecticut on May 26, 2017.

Ayala performed with Leslie West at B.B. King Blues Club & Grill on June 24, 2017. The two performed a duet version of "Mississippi Queen".

In August 2017, Amanda Ayala performed at the annual Spiedie Fest. She opened for rock group Blue Öyster Cult and Eddie Money. Thousands of people attended this concert in Binghamton, New York. The line up for the three-day event included country stars, Kellie Pickler and Sara Evans, along with Dennis DeYoung of Styx (band).

Amanda opened for and performed with American Idol winner Taylor Hicks at the Palace Danbury Theater. The show was met with great reviews after both singers performed an impromptu version of "The House of the Rising Sun".

Ayala performed with rock singer Dee Snider from Twisted Sister on November 4, 2017 at The Chance.

Amanda is working on her debut pop release. She is working with a platinum-selling producer. Amanda has yet to reveal who she is working with but her social media indicates she is currently recording and in the studio.

In early March 2019 Topgolf announced its second season of the original series Who Will Rock You?. Amanda confirmed that she will be a contestant on season 2. Judges on the show include Dee Snider and Kerri Kassem. The show aired on March 28, 2019, and Amanda was selected to move on the final 12 of the competition. On Episode 4, The Amanda Ayala band performed a rendition of Proud Mary. The studio version was made available on Spotify following the performance.

In July 2021, Amanda spoke with KeyLine Mag and announced the release of her newest single titled "Seventeen". The song peaked Number 1 on the New Music Weekly Indie Chart for two weeks in a row, making it Amanda's first #1 of her career.

== Discography ==
=== Singles ===
Year	Title	Peak chart positions			
Year	Title	New Music Weekly Hot 100	New Music Weekly Hot AC	iTunes Rock Chart	New Music Weekly Indie Chart
2015	"Mississippi Queen"	—	—	100	—
2015	"Edge of Seventeen"	—	—	86	—
2016	"Her."	—	—	—	—
2019	"Lost You"	27	34	—	—
2021	"Seventeen"	30	20	—	1
2021	"—" denotes a recording that did not chart or was not released in that territory.				

Amanda is currently recording an EP and it is scheduled to be released in 2019.
