= I'm That Kind of Girl =

Single by Patty Loveless

from the album On Down the Line
- A-side: "I'm That Kind of Girl"
- B-side: "Some Morning Soon"
- Released: January 12, 1991
- Recorded: 1990
- Genre: Country
- Length: 3:06
- Label: MCA Nashville
- Songwriters: Matraca Berg; Ronnie Samoset
- Producer: Tony Brown

Patty Loveless singles chronology
"The Night's Too Long" (1990)	"I'm That Kind of Girl" (1991)	"Blue Memories" (1991)

Music video
- "I'm That Kind of Girl"

"I'm That Kind of Girl" is a song written by Matraca Berg and Ronnie Samoset, and recorded by the American country music artist Patty Loveless. It was released in January 1991 as the third single from her album On Down the Line. Both songwriters were later credited for writing her 2003 single, "On Your Way Home".

== Background ==
The song was in the Billboard Hot Country Singles and Tracks chart for 20 weeks, reaching number 5 during the week of March 30, 1991.

== Music video ==
Directed by John Lloyd Miller, the video shows Loveless in several different outfits (one of which shows her in black-and-white, but the clothes in color) against an all-white background singing the song, while trying to scope out the right man. At one point she is seen with a young girl wearing the same purple dress as her in the scene. A young boy also appears, and he and an older man tip their hat to her and the girl at the end of the video.

== Chart positions ==
Chart (1991)	Peak position
Canada Country Singles (RPM)	48
US Hot Country Songs (Billboard)	5

=== Year-end charts ===
Chart (1991)	Position
US Country Songs (Billboard)	62
