= Jordan Smith (musician) =

American singer-songwriter

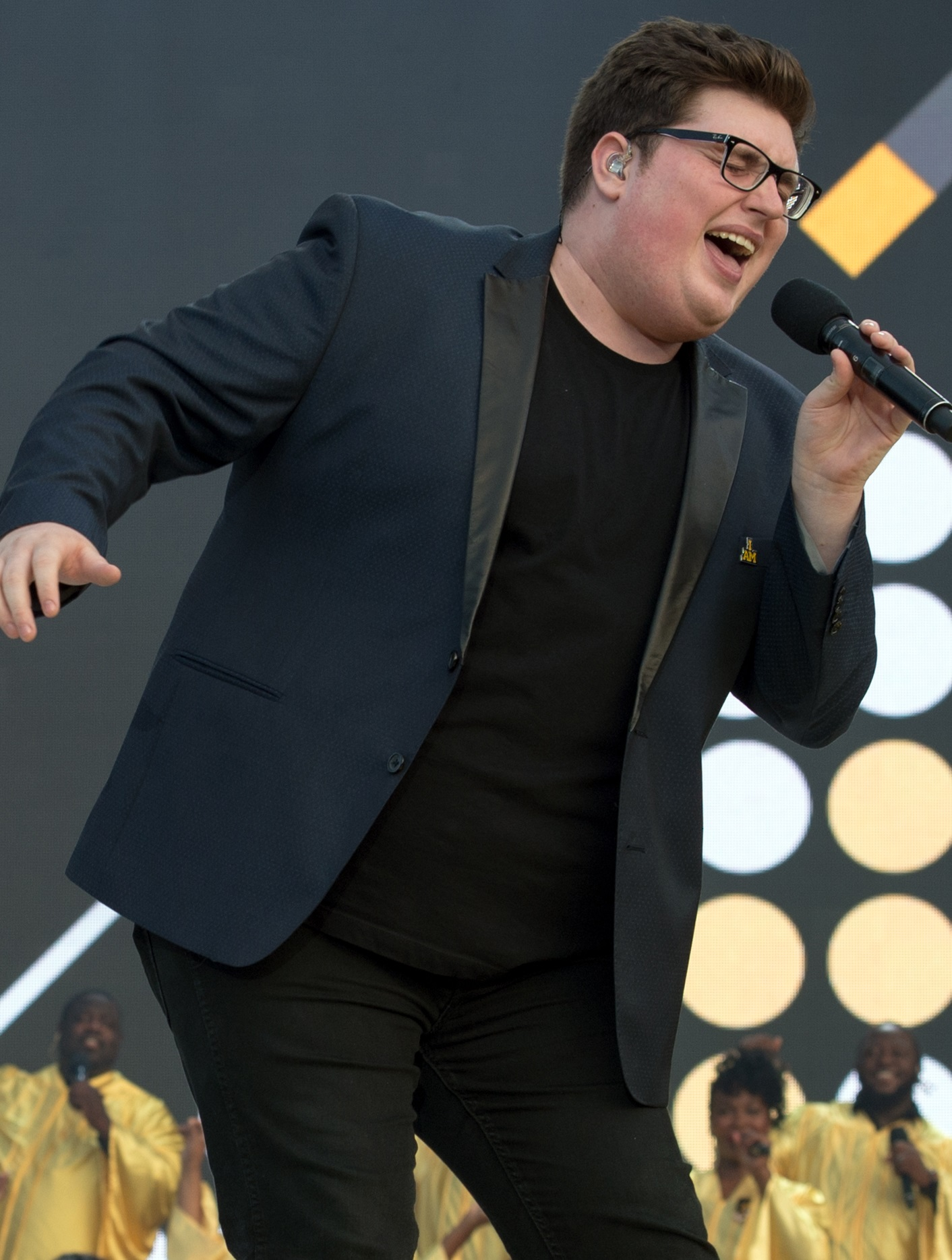
- Smith performing in 2016

Background information
- Born: Jordan Mackenzie Smith; November 4, 1993 (age 32); Harlan, Kentucky, U.S.
- Genres: Pop; contemporary Christian; gospel
- Occupations: Singer; songwriter
- Instruments: Vocals; piano; guitar
- Years active: 2015–present
- Labels: Republic/Universal; Gaither Music
- Website: jordansmithofficial.com

Jordan Mackenzie Smith (born November 4, 1993) is an American gospel singer, songwriter, and musician from Harlan, Kentucky. Smith began singing in his church choir and continued through his college education at Lee University.

In 2015 he gained national recognition when he won season 9 of the singing competition The Voice. During his time on The Voice he was the show's 1st artist of the season to reach No. 1 in sales of pop songs in the iTunes Store, and set new sales marks on Billboard charts. In 2022, he represented Kentucky on the American Song Contest with the song "Sparrow," finishing third place.

== Early life ==
Jordan Smith was born on November 4, 1993, in Whitley County, Kentucky, to Kelley and Geri Smith (née Saylor), both of whom are musicians. They raised him in the church choir at a young age, in the congregation of House of Mercy in the town of Wallins Creek, Kentucky. Smith graduated from Harlan County High School.

In 2012, he won the Poke Sallet Idol competition at the annual Poke Sallet festival.

Smith attended Lee University in Cleveland, Tennessee, and was a member of the Lee University Singers.

== Career ==
=== The Voice (2015) ===
Smith came to national attention in 2015 during his participation on season 9 of The Voice. His audition performance of "Chandelier" led all four coaches to turn their chairs; Smith chose to be part of Adam Levine's team after Levine told him, "I think you're the most important person that's ever been on this show." (Note: For season 9, the coaches were Levine, Gwen Stefani, Pharrell Williams and Blake Shelton.)

Smith had auditioned for the show once before and was rejected. Even when he was accepted for the show, he had his doubts until the reactions started pouring in. "I [thought], 'Wow, people see something in me that honestly I didn't think was there.' I thought maybe I had fooled everyone! It took a lot of convincing for me to finally start seeing myself as a performer and artist." Smith said it was his performance of "Halo" during the live playoffs that allowed him to believe he had "something to say as an artist". According to Slate, Smith was dubbed "the unicorn" during the show because his voice is "genderless and expansive ... as ambiguous as it is precise, quickly scaling and spelunking through octaves, never anything but perfectly on pitch."

For week two of the live shows, Smith began "Great Is Thy Faithfulness" by singing a cappella, then accompanied himself on piano; the performance made Smith the first artist of the season to reach No. 1 in sales in the iTunes Store, ahead of "Hello" by Adele. "Great Is Thy Faithfulness" landed on the Billboard magazine charts as well; it placed at No. 30 on the Hot 100, and was No. 1 on the Christian Songs chart for two straight weeks. He was again No. 1 on Christian Songs with his recording of "Hallelujah", which entered the Hot 100 chart at No. 61.

Smith chose Queen's "Somebody to Love" for his semi-final song. After the performance, Levine commented, "I don't need to say anything at all because that's one of the best things I've ever seen in my entire life." (Note: Moments earlier, Levine had taken the stage to hug Smith and literally declare the performance "a 'drop the mic' moment.") Within 30 minutes, the single was the best selling song in the iTunes Store, knocking "Hello" from the top spot for a second time.

"Mary, Did You Know?" was Smith's choice for the final competition show. It became his second consecutive performance to reach the top of the iTunes Store, bumping "Hello" a third time. (Note: The week before, Smith had missed his third opportunity when "Hallelujah" peaked at No. 2, prompting Levine to complain jokingly about "that pesky Adele.") For the results finale, Smith teamed up with Usher and sang David Guetta's "Without You". At the end of the broadcast, Smith was declared the winner of season nine, earning US$100,000 and a Republic Records recording contract.

- Studio version of performance reached the top 10 on iTunes

Stage	Song	Original Artist	Date	Order	Result
Blind Auditions	"Chandelier"	Sia	Sept. 21, 2015	1.6	All four chairs turned; joined Team Adam
Battles (Top 48)	"Like I Can" (vs. Regina Love)	Sam Smith	Oct. 12, 2015	7.1	Saved by Adam
Knockouts (Top 32)	"Set Fire to the Rain" (vs. Viktor Király)	Adele	Oct. 26, 2015	11.6	Saved by Adam
Live Playoffs (Top 24)	"Halo"	Beyoncé	Nov. 9, 2015	15.12	Saved by Public Vote
Live Top 12	"Great Is Thy Faithfulness"	Thomas Chisholm	Nov. 16, 2015	18.11	Saved by Public Vote
Live Top 11	"Who You Are"	Jessie J	Nov. 23, 2015	20.9	Saved by Public Vote
Live Top 10	"Hallelujah"	Leonard Cohen	Nov. 30, 2015	22.7	Saved by Public Vote
Live Semifinals (Top 9)	"Somebody to Love"	Queen	Dec. 7, 2015	24.9	Saved by Public Vote
Live Finale (Final 4)	"Climb Ev'ry Mountain"	The Sound Of Music	Dec. 14, 2015	26.1	Winner
Live Finale (Final 4)	"God Only Knows" (with Adam Levine)	The Beach Boys	Dec. 14, 2015	26.5	Winner
Live Finale (Final 4)	"Mary, Did You Know?"	Michael English	Dec. 14, 2015	26.11	Winner

Non-competition performances

Song	Collaborator(s)
"Diamonds"	Amy Vachal, Chance Peña, Blaine Mitchell, Shelby Brown, Keith Semple
"Wouldn't It Be Nice"	Adam Levine, Amy Vachal and Shelby Brown
"Lean On"	Top 24
"Without You"	Usher
"Any Way You Want It"	Amy Vachal, Evan McKeel, Korin Bukowski, Mark Hood and Regina Love

=== After The Voice ===
As of December 2015, Jordan Smith was the highest selling artist ever to compete on The Voice. One week after his victory, Smith made history on Billboard's Christian Songs chart; he became the first artist ever to hold the top two positions concurrently when his cover of "Mary, Did You Know?" overtook "Hallelujah" as the No. 1 song. Smith's version of "Great Is Thy Faithfulness" occupied the No. 8 spot at the same time, making him only the third artist ever to chart three songs in the top 10 simultaneously.

The Voice: Jordan Smith: The Complete Season 9 Collection was released in December 2015, entering the Billboard 200 albums chart at No. 11, earning "Hot Shot Debut" honors. Two tracks from the album debuted in the top ten on the Digital Singles chart; "Mary, Did You Know?" debuted at No. 1.

Upon his return to Kentucky, Smith was named a Kentucky Colonel by the Secretary of State, at a parade in Smith's honor. He was also named the 2015 Kentucky Monthly Kentuckian of the Year. Harlan County Judge-Executive Dan Mosley said Smith's win had a huge impact on an area that is struggling to rebuild its economy. "Jordan may have single-handedly reversed negative stereotypes on our region that will help give us an economic bump. In January 2016, Smith was announced as grand marshal of the Kentucky Derby Festival Pegasus Parade in May. That same month, he performed the national anthem alongside the Boston Pops Orchestra at the 2016 NHL Winter Classic at Gillette Stadium in Foxborough, Massachusetts featuring the Montreal Canadiens and Boston Bruins.

On January 6, 2016, Smith performed "You Are So Beautiful" alongside David Foster at the 42nd People's Choice Awards. During Smith's introduction, it was announced that The Voice took its third consecutive Favorite Competition TV Show award.

The track listing for Smith's debut album was announced in February 2016; Something Beautiful was released on March 18, debuted at No. 2 in sales in the iTunes Store, and took the top spot on March 22. iTunes' staff praised Smith's "fearless, confident singing, which elevates even the simplest phrases into stirring statements". Jake's Take offered a B+ grade for "the connection that Jordan had with each and every individual track that is on Something Beautiful. I hope that for his sophomore attempt, Jordan and the Republic Records team find high quality original material" for Smith. The Knoxville News Sentinel gave the album three stars (out of five) for its "entirely too cautious" approach and "safe but beautiful" songs. Smith's take on "You Are So Beautiful" is "embarrassingly sterilized"; his cover of "Beautiful", however, "is the album highlight as he taps into the life-affirming lyrics with touching gentleness". Brittany Frederick of AXS wrote, "Voice fans who purchase the record won't be disappointed ... but it still feels like the real Jordan Smith has yet to stand up."

On May 3, 2018, Jordan Smith announced via his Instagram account that he wrote "Ashes" for the Deadpool 2 soundtrack, which was performed by Celine Dion. On March 28, 2022, Smith debuted an original song, "Sparrow", on American Song Contest, where he represented the state of Kentucky. He placed 3rd in the Grand Final.

On October 11, 2025, he appeared at "Big Blue Madness", the beginning of the Kentucky Wildcats men's basketball and Kentucky Wildcats women's basketball season. He sang You'll Never Leave Harlan Alive at the introduction of Trent Noah, a men's basketball player also from Harlan, Kentucky.

== Personal life ==
Smith proposed marriage to girlfriend Kristen Denny on January 1, 2016. "She's been there every step of the way," he said. They were married on June 25, 2016, in Middlesboro, Kentucky.

== Discography ==
=== Studio albums ===
Title	Album details	Peak chart positions			Sales
Title	Album details	US	US Holiday	CAN	Sales
Something Beautiful	Released: March 18, 2016; Label: Republic/Universal; Format: CD, digital download	2	—	19	US: 73,000
’Tis the Season	Released: October 28, 2016; Label: Republic/Universal; Format: CD, digital download	11	3	29	
Only Love	Released: August 10, 2018; Label: Republic/Universal; Format: CD, digital download	— (Note: Only Love did not enter the Billboard 200, but peaked at No. 51 on the Billboard Top Album Sales)	—	—	
The People's Hymnal	Released: February 21, 2024; Label: Gaither Music/Capitol Christian/Universal; Format: CD, vinyl, digital download	—	—	—	
"—" denotes a recording that failed to chart or was not eligible.

=== Singles ===
Title	Year	Peak chart positions		Sales	Album
Title	Year	US Christ	US AC	Sales	Album
"Stand in the Light"	2016	11	25	US: 10,000	Something Beautiful
"Only Love"	2018	—	23		Only Love
"End in Love"	2018	—	—		Only Love

=== Other charted songs ===
Title	Year	Peak chart positions		Album
Title	Year	US Christ	US AC	Album
"Amazing Grace"	2016	31	—	Something Beautiful
"You're a Mean One, Mr. Grinch"	2016	—	17	'Tis the Season

=== Releases from The Voice ===
==== Albums ====
Title	Album details	Peak chart positions		Sales
Title	Album details	US	CAN	Sales
The Voice: Jordan Smith: The Complete Season 9 Collection	Released: December 15, 2015; Label: Republic/Universal; Format: Digital download	11	48	US: 48,000

==== Competition singles ====
Title	Year	Peak chart positions		Debut week sales
Title	Year	US	US Christ	Debut week sales
"Halo"	2015	88	—	
"Great Is Thy Faithfulness"	2015	30	1	US: 138,000
"Hallelujah"	2015	61	1	US: 68,000
"Somebody to Love"	2015	21	—	US: 164,000
"Mary Did You Know"	2015	24	1	US: 161,000
"Climb Every Mountain"	2015	72	—	US: 67,000
"God Only Knows" (with Adam Levine)	2015	90	—	US: 50,000

== Notes ==
Awards and achievements
Preceded by Sawyer Fredericks	The Voice (American); Winner; 2015 (Fall)	Succeeded by Alisan Porter
Preceded by "Please"	The Voice (American); Winner's song "Climb Ev'ry Mountain"; 2015 (Fall)	Succeeded by "Down That Road"
