= Kehlani World Tour =

2026–2027 concert tour by Kehlani

- Tour by Kehlani
- Location: Asia; Australia; Europe; North America
- Associated albums: Kehlani
- Start date: August 6, 2026
- End date: March 5, 2027
- Legs: 4
- No. of shows: 53
- Supporting acts: Durand Bernarr; Isaia Huron; TheARTI$T; Waseel; Odeal

Kehlani concert chronology
- Crash World Tour (2024–2025); Kehlani World Tour (2026–2027)

The Kehlani World Tour is the fourth concert tour by American singer-songwriter Kehlani in support of their (Note: Kehlani uses both she/her and they/them pronouns and switches between them. This article uses they/them for consistency.) fifth album, Kehlani (2026). It began on August 6, 2026, in Minneapolis, with shows across North America, Europe, South Africa, Asia, and Australia, and will conclude in Honolulu on March 5, 2027, comprising 53 shows. Durand Bernarr, Isaia Huron, TheARTI$T, Odeal, Waseel, and Destin Conrad will serve as the opening acts.

== Background ==
On May 26, 2026, Kehlani formally announced the tour, with 33 shows across North America from August through October 2026. Tickets are going on sale on May 29, with various presales running from May 27 to May 28, 2026. On May 29, 2026, Kehlani announced the European leg of tour. Presale tickets will go on sale June 1, while the general sale is slated for June 3, 2026. On August 19, 2026, Kehlani announced the Australian leg of the tour. On October 20, 2026, Kehlani added shows in the Philippines and Hawaii. Later, a second date in Honolulu was added due to demand.

== Set list ==
This set list is from the August 6, 2026, concert in Minneapolis. It does not represent all concerts for the duration of the tour.

1. "Anotha Luva"
2. "Shoulda Never"
3. "No Such Thing"
4. "You Got It"
5. "Back and Forth"
6. "Lights On"
7. "Serial Lover"
8. "Sweet Nuthins"
9. "Piece of Mind"
10. "Open (Passionate)"
11. "Call Me Back"
12. "Pocket"
13. "Hate the Club"
14. "After Hours"
15. "Oooh"
16. "Toxic"
17. "Can You Blame Me"
18. "Still"
19. "I Need You"
20. "Footsteps"
21. "Out the Window"
22. "Nights Like This"
23. "Distraction"
24. "Everything"
25. "Cruise Control"
26. "Unlearn"
27. "Folded"

== Tour dates ==
List of 2026 concerts
Date (2026)	City	Country	Venue	Opening acts
August 6	Minneapolis	United States	Minneapolis Armory	Durand Bernarr; Isaia Huron; TheARTI$T; Waseel
August 7	Milwaukee	United States	Landmark Credit Union Live	Isaia Huron; TheARTI$T; Waseel
August 9	Chicago	United States	Huntington Bank Pavilion	Durand Bernarr; Isaia Huron; TheARTI$T; Waseel
August 10	Indianapolis	United States	Everwise Amphitheater	Durand Bernarr; Isaia Huron; TheARTI$T; Waseel
August 13	Detroit	United States	Michigan Lottery Amphitheatre	Durand Bernarr; Isaia Huron; TheARTI$T; Waseel
August 14	Cuyahoga Falls	United States	Blossom Music Center	Durand Bernarr; Isaia Huron; TheARTI$T; Waseel
August 16	Toronto	Canada	RBC Amphitheatre	Durand Bernarr; Isaia Huron; TheARTI$T; Waseel
August 17	Darien Center	United States	Darien Lake Amphitheatre	Durand Bernarr; Isaia Huron; TheARTI$T; Waseel
August 19	Boston	United States	MGM Music Hall at Fenway	Durand Bernarr; Isaia Huron; TheARTI$T; Waseel
August 21	New York City	United States	Barclays Center	Durand Bernarr; Isaia Huron; TheARTI$T; Waseel
August 23	Uncasville	United States	Mohegan Sun Arena	Durand Bernarr; Isaia Huron; TheARTI$T; Waseel
August 29	Richmond	United States	Allianz Amphitheater at Riverfront	Durand Bernarr; Isaia Huron; TheARTI$T; Waseel
August 31	Raleigh	United States	Coastal Credit Union Music Park	Durand Bernarr; Isaia Huron; TheARTI$T; Waseel
September 1	Charlotte	United States	Truliant Amphitheater	Durand Bernarr; Isaia Huron; TheARTI$T; Waseel
September 3	Atlanta	United States	Lakewood Amphitheatre	Durand Bernarr; Isaia Huron; TheARTI$T; Waseel
September 5 (Note: Originally scheduled for August 26, but was rescheduled to September 5 due to Kehlani's hospitalization for severe vocal illness.)	Camden	United States	Freedom Mortgage Pavilion	Durand Bernarr; Isaia Huron; TheARTI$T; Waseel
September 6 (Note: Originally scheduled for August 27, but was rescheduled to September 26 due to Kehlani's hospitalization for severe vocal illness.)	Columbia	United States	Merriweather Post Pavilion	Durand Bernarr; Isaia Huron; TheARTI$T; Waseel
September 8	Nashville	United States	Nashville Municipal Auditorium	Durand Bernarr; Isaia Huron; TheARTI$T; Waseel
September 10	West Palm Beach (Note: Labeled as Miami in promotional material.)	United States	iTHINK Financial Amphitheatre	Durand Bernarr; Isaia Huron; TheARTI$T; Waseel
September 11	Tampa	United States	MidFlorida Credit Union Amphitheatre	Durand Bernarr; Isaia Huron; TheARTI$T; Waseel
September 13	The Woodlands (Note: Labeled as Houston in promotional material.)	United States	Cynthia Woods Mitchell Pavilion	Durand Bernarr; Isaia Huron; TheARTI$T; Waseel
September 15	Austin	United States	Germania Insurance Amphitheater	Durand Bernarr; Isaia Huron; TheARTI$T; Waseel
September 16	Dallas	United States	Dos Equis Pavilion	Durand Bernarr; Isaia Huron; TheARTI$T; Waseel
September 18	Oklahoma City	United States	Zoo Amphitheatre	Durand Bernarr; Isaia Huron; TheARTI$T; Waseel
September 20	Albuquerque	United States	First Financial Credit Union Amphitheater	Durand Bernarr; Isaia Huron; TheARTI$T; Waseel
September 21	Phoenix	United States	Talking Stick Resort Amphitheatre	Durand Bernarr; Isaia Huron; TheARTI$T; Waseel
September 23	San Diego	United States	Viejas Arena	Durand Bernarr; Isaia Huron; TheARTI$T; Waseel
September 24	Inglewood	United States	Intuit Dome	Durand Bernarr; Isaia Huron; TheARTI$T; Waseel
September 26	Portland	United States	Theater of the Clouds	Durand Bernarr; Isaia Huron; TheARTI$T; Waseel
September 27	Seattle	United States	Climate Pledge Arena	Durand Bernarr; Isaia Huron; TheARTI$T; Waseel
September 29	Vancouver	Canada	Thunderbird Sports Centre	Durand Bernarr; Isaia Huron; TheARTI$T; Waseel
October 3	Mountain View (Note: Labeled as San Francisco in promotional material.)	United States	Shoreline Amphitheatre	Durand Bernarr; Isaia Huron; TheARTI$T; Waseel
October 4	Mountain View	United States	Shoreline Amphitheatre	Durand Bernarr; Isaia Huron; TheARTI$T; Waseel
November 8 (Note: Part of the Afropunk Festival.)	Salvador	Brazil	Parque de Exposições de Salvador	—N/a
November 29	Berlin	Germany	Velodrom	Odeal; Waseel
December 1	Brussels	Belgium	Forest National	Odeal; Waseel
December 3	Paris	France	Adidas Arena	Odeal; Waseel
December 5	Düsseldorf	Germany	PSD Bank Dome	Odeal; Waseel
December 6	Amsterdam	Netherlands	Ziggo Dome	Odeal; Waseel
December 8	London	England	The O_{2} Arena	Odeal; Waseel
December 10	Manchester	England	Co-op Live	Odeal; Waseel
December 15	Pretoria	South Africa	Sunbet Arena	Destin Conrad
December 17	Cape Town	South Africa	Grand Arena	Destin Conrad

List of 2027 concerts
Date (2027)	City	Country	Venue	Opening acts
February 15	Pasay (Note: Labeled as Manila in promotional material.)	Philippines	SM Mall of Asia Arena	Waseel
February 18	Perth	Australia	RAC Arena	Waseel
February 21	Melbourne	Australia	Rod Laver Arena	Waseel
February 23	Sydney	Australia	Afterpay Arena	Waseel
February 25	Brisbane	Australia	Brisbane Entertainment Centre	Waseel
March 4	Honolulu	United States	Blaisdell Arena	Waseel
March 5	Honolulu	United States	Blaisdell Arena	Waseel

=== Canceled dates ===
List of canceled dates
Date (2026)	City	Country	Venue	Reason
September 4	Birmingham	United States	Coca-Cola Amphitheater	Unknown
