= Crash World Tour =

2024–2025 concert tour by Kehlani

- Tour by Kehlani
- Location: Asia; Europe; North America; Oceania
- Associated albums: Crash; While We Wait 2
- Start date: September 4, 2024
- End date: March 26, 2025
- Legs: 4
- No. of shows: 54
- Supporting acts: Flo; Anycia; Destin Conrad; Kwn; Keyrah; JessB

Kehlani concert chronology
- Blue Water Road Trip (2022); Crash World Tour (2024–2025); Kehlani World Tour (2026)

The Crash World Tour was the third concert tour by American singer-songwriter Kehlani in support of their fourth album, Crash (2024). It began on September 4, 2024, in Minneapolis, with shows across North America, Europe, Asia and Oceania. It concluded in Honolulu on March 26, 2025, comprising 54 shows. Flo, Anycia, Destin Conrad, Kwn, Keyrah, and JessB served as the opening acts.

== Background ==
On July 23, 2024, Kehlani formally announced the tour, with 32 shows across North America from September through November 2024. Tickets went on sale on July 26, with a presale that ran from July 23 until July 25. On November 19, Kehlani announced international dates for the tour, expanding the tour with a total of 54 shows.

== Tour dates ==
List of 2024 concerts, showing date, city, country, venue and opening acts
Date (2024)	City	Country	Venue	Opening acts
September 4	Minneapolis	United States	Minneapolis Armory	Flo; Anycia
September 6	Chicago	United States	Aragon Ballroom	Flo; Anycia
September 10	Sterling Heights	United States	Michigan Lottery Amphitheatre	Flo; Anycia
September 13	Bridgeport	United States	Hartford HealthCare Amphitheater	Flo; Anycia
September 14	Camden	United States	Freedom Mortgage Pavilion	Flo; Anycia
September 17	Boston	United States	MGM Music Hall at Fenway	Flo; Anycia
September 18	Fairfax	United States	EagleBank Arena	Flo; Anycia
September 20	New York City	United States	Barclays Center	Flo; Anycia
September 21	Portsmouth	United States	Atlantic Union Bank Pavilion	Flo; Anycia
September 23	Louisville	United States	Palace Theatre	Flo; Anycia
September 24	Atlanta	United States	Cellairis Amphitheatre	Flo; Anycia
September 25	New Orleans	United States	The Fillmore New Orleans	Flo; Anycia
October 1	Raleigh	United States	Red Hat Amphitheater	Flo; Anycia
October 2	Charlotte	United States	Skyla Credit Union Amphitheatre	Flo; Anycia
October 4 (Note: The concert October 4, 2024 is part of the Austin City Limits Music Festival.)	Austin	United States	Zilker Park	—N/a
October 8	Houston	United States	713 Music Hall	Flo; Anycia
October 11	Irving	United States	Toyota Music Factory	Flo; Anycia
October 12	Rogers	United States	Walmart Arkansas Music Pavilion	Flo; Anycia
October 15	Denver	United States	Fillmore Auditorium	Flo; Anycia
October 16	Salt Lake City	United States	The Complex	Flo; Anycia
October 18	Seattle	United States	Climate Pledge Arena	Flo; Anycia
October 19	Portland	United States	Theater of the Clouds	Flo; Anycia
October 21	Vancouver	Canada	Thunderbird Sports Centre	Flo; Anycia
October 23	Wheatland	United States	Hard Rock Live	Flo; Anycia
October 25	San Diego	United States	Viejas Arena	Flo; Anycia
October 26	Paradise (Note: Labelled as Las Vegas in promotion material.)	United States	Michelob Ultra Arena	Flo; Anycia
October 29	Phoenix	United States	Talking Stick Resort Amphitheatre	Flo; Anycia
October 30	Inglewood	United States	Kia Forum	Flo; Anycia
November 2	San Francisco	United States	Chase Center	Flo; Anycia
December 6 (Note: Originally scheduled for September 27.)	Miami	United States	FPL Solar Amphitheater	Anycia; Destin Conrad
December 8 (Note: Originally scheduled for September 28.)	Tampa	United States	Yuengling Center	Anycia; Destin Conrad

List of 2025 concerts, showing date, city, country, venue and opening acts
Date (2025)	City	Country	Venue	Opening acts
January 19	Zürich	Switerzland	Halle 622	Kwn; Keyrah
January 21	Amsterdam	Netherlands	AFAS Live	Kwn; Keyrah
January 22	Brussels	Belgium	Ancienne Belgique	Kwn; Keyrah
January 24	Vienna	Austria	Planet.tt Bank Austria Halle	Kwn; Keyrah
January 25	Berlin	Germany	Astra Kulturhaus	Kwn; Keyrah
January 27	Paris	France	Zénith Paris	Kwn; Keyrah
January 29	London	England	The O_{2} Arena	Kwn; Keyrah
January 31	Manchester	England	O_{2} Victoria Warehouse	Kwn; Keyrah
February 23 (Note: The concert February 23, 2025 is part of the PLUS63 Festival.)	Manila	Philippines	Aseana City Concert Grounds	—N/a
February 26	Yokohama	Japan	National Convention Hall	—N/a
February 28	Osaka	Japan	Namba Hatch	—N/a
March 2	Guangzhou	China	Tai Space Livehouse	—N/a
March 4	Shanghai	China	Modern Sky Lab	—N/a
March 6	Seoul	South Korea	Olympic Hall	—N/a
March 8	Hong Kong	China	Kitty Woo Stadium	—N/a
March 10	Taipei	Taiwan	Zepp New Taipei	—N/a
March 13	Singapore		The Star Performing Arts Centre	—N/a
March 15	Perth	Australia	Perth High Performance Centre	JessB
March 18	Melbourne	Australia	John Cain Arena	JessB
March 19	Sydney	Australia	ICC Sydney Theatre	JessB
March 21	Brisbane	Australia	Riverstage	JessB
March 23	Auckland	New Zealand	Spark Arena	JessB
March 26	Honolulu	United States	Waikiki Shell	—N/a

=== Cancelled concerts ===
List of cancelled concerts showing date, city, country, venue and reason
Date	City	Country	Venue	Reason
September 11, 2024	Toronto	Canada	Scotiabank Arena	Voice rest
February 21, 2025	Kuala Lumpur	Malaysia	World Trade Centre Kuala Lumpur	Unforeseen Circumstances
