= Kehlani (album) =

Studio album by Kehlani
- Released: April 24, 2026
- Recorded: 2024–2026
- Genre: R&B
- Length: 59:39
- Label: Atlantic
- Producers: Babyface; Camper; Daniel Church; Antonio Dixon; Dixson; D.K. the Punisher; Don Mills; Jermaine Dupri; Alex Goldblatt; Andre Harris; Rich Harrison; Jimmy Jam; Terry Lewis; Pop & Oak; Khris Riddick-Tynes; Allen Ritter; Jayme Silverstein; the Stereotypes; Dawit Wilson

Kehlani chronology
While We Wait 2 (2024)	Kehlani (2026)

Singles from Kehlani
- 1. "Folded" Released: June 11, 2025; 2. "Out the Window" Released: November 7, 2025; 3. "Back and Forth" Released: April 10, 2026; 4. "Shoulda Never" Released: April 24, 2026; 5. "Cruise Control" Released: June 12, 2026

Kehlani is the fifth studio album by American singer-songwriter Kehlani. It was released through Atlantic Records on April 24, 2026, in tandem with Kehlani's 31st birthday. The album features guest appearances from Lil Wayne, Clipse, Brandy, Missy Elliott, Usher, Lil Jon, T-Pain, Cardi B, Big Sean, and Leon Thomas. The album serves as the follow-up to their (Note: Kehlani uses both she/her and they/them pronouns and switches between them. This article uses they/them for consistency.) previous projects, Crash (2024) and While We Wait 2 (2024), and was preceded by three singles: "Folded", "Out the Window" and "Back and Forth". Kehlani is supported by the Kehlani World Tour, which began in August 2026. The album is nominated for "Best R&B Album" at the 69th Grammy Awards.

== Background and composition ==
After the publication of their fourth studio album Crash (2024), Kehlani confirmed a follow-up record project. On June 11, 2025, they published the solo single "Folded", for which they won their first two Grammy Awards for Best R&B Performance and Best R&B Song. At the award ceremony the singer announced they were working in a recording studio for new material and closing their fifith record project. Kehlani also revealed that during the two years spent recording and producing the project, they went through a difficult personal period, including being diagnosed with and treated for mental health issues.

== Singles and promotion ==
The lead single of the album, "Folded", was released on June 11, 2025. The second single, "Out the Window", was released on November 7, 2025. On March 17, 2026, Kehlani announced the album, along with its cover art and release date. The third single, "Back and Forth", featuring Missy Elliott, was released on April 10, 2026. The fourth single, "Shoulda Never", was serviced to Italian radio on April 24.

== Critical reception ==
Professional ratings
Aggregate scores
Source	Rating
Metacritic	82/100
Review scores
Source	Rating
Beats per Minute	7.6/10
Clash	7/10
NME	4/5 stars
Pitchfork	7.8/10

According to the review aggregator Metacritic, Kehlani received "universal acclaim" based on a weighted average score of 82 out of 100 from seven critic scores.

Kyle Denis of Billboard wrote that the tracks "painstakingly mine '90s and '00s R&B for both inspiration and guidance, while still feeling totally singular" and although the reviewer noticed there are too many features, "Kehlani deftly uses her collaborations to flaunt her expert grasp on different R&B song archetypes", concluding the review by stating that "Kehlani stands as more of an examination of its creator’s relationship to R&B than a reflection of where the multihyphenate currently is in her personal life". In a positive review, Steven J. Horowitz of Variety also explained that the singer "subsuming herself in the aesthetic and conventions of her influences while adapting them into one of her most powerful mission statements to date", finding Kehlani "at the peak of her artistic powers".

== Commercial performance ==
Kehlani debuted at number four on the US Billboard 200 with 69,000 album-equivalent units, which included 24,000 pure album sales in its first week. Also, this was their second No. 1 on the Top R&B/Hip-Hop Albums, making it their 7th consecutive top 10 album on Top R&B/Hip-Hop Albums. The album also accumulated 45.37 million on-demand audio streams in the United States.

== Track listing ==
Kehlani track listing
No.	Title	Writer(s)	Producer(s)	Length
1.	"Intro"	Kehlani Parrish; Antonio Dixon; Khris Riddick-Tynes	Riddick-Tynes; Dixon	0:31
2.	"Anotha Luva" (featuring Lil Wayne)	Parrish; Dwayne Carter; Rich Harrison; Riddick-Tynes	Riddick-Tynes; Harrison; Alex Goldblatt^{[a]}	4:01
3.	"No Such Thing" (featuring Clipse)	Parrish; Warren Felder; Jayme Silverstein; Gene Thornton; Terrence Thornton; Andrew Wansel; Dawit Wilson	Pop & Oak; Silverstein^{[c]}	3:40
4.	"Folded"	Parrish; Miloš Angelov; Andre Harris; Donovan Knight; Riddick-Tynes; Darius Scott; D. Wilson	Harris; D.K. the Punisher; Don Mills; Riddick-Tynes	3:57
5.	"I Need You" (featuring Brandy)	Parrish; Dixon; James Harris III; Terry Lewis; Riddick-Tynes; D. Wilson	Riddick-Tynes; Dixon; Jimmy Jam; Lewis; Dixson^{[v]}; Walter Millsap^{[v]}	4:03
6.	"Oooh"	Parrish; Dixon; Durrell Babbs; Keri Hilson; Riddick-Tynes	Riddick-Tynes; Dixon	4:08
7.	"Back and Forth" (featuring Missy Elliott)	Parrish; Melissa Elliott; Ariowa Irosogie; Ray McCullough II; Jeremy Reeves; Ray Romulus; Riddick-Tynes; Daniel Upchurch; Kamal Wilson; Jonathan Yip	Riddick-Tynes; the Stereotypes; 9am^{[a]}	3:34
8.	"Shoulda Never" (featuring Usher)	Parrish; Scott; Kenneth Edmonds; Riddick-Tynes	Riddick-Tynes; Babyface; Goldblatt^{[a]}; Dixson^{[v]}	3:06
9.	"You Got It"	Parrish; Felder; Oscar Linnander; Silverstein; D. Wilson	Riddick-Tynes; Oak; Silverstein^{[c]}	4:37
10.	"Out the Window"	Parrish; Dixon; Ashton Norful; Riddick-Tynes; Talay Riley	Riddick-Tynes; Dixon	4:16
11.	"Still"	Parrish; Darhyl Camper Jr.; Scott; Maleik Loveridge	Dixson^{[p]}; Camper; Goldblatt^{[a]}	3:33
12.	"Call Me Back" (featuring T-Pain and Lil Jon)	Parrish; Faheem Najm; Silverstein; Jonathan Smith; Upchurch; Wansel	Pop & Oak; Silverstein^{[c]}	3:19
13.	"Pocket" (featuring Cardi B)	Parrish; Belcalis Almanzar; Goldblatt; Riddick-Tynes; Upchurch; D. Wilson	Riddick-Tynes; Goldblatt; D. Wilson; Daniel Church; Dixson^{[v]}	3:52
14.	"Lights On" (featuring Big Sean)	Parrish; Sean Anderson; Jermaine Cherry; Riddick-Tynes; Allen Ritter	Riddick-Tynes; Jermaine Dupri; Ritter; Dixson^{[v]}	2:59
15.	"Sweet Nuthins" (featuring Leon Thomas)	Parrish; Thomas; Lazaro Camejo; Goldblatt; Ethan Polk-Trauman; Riddick-Tynes; Upchurch	Riddick-Tynes; Goldblatt	2:42
16.	"Cruise Control"	Parrish; Goldblatt; Norful; Riddick-Tynes; Upchurch	Riddick-Tynes; Goldblatt; Eric Dawkins^{[v]}	3:04
17.	"Unlearn"	Parrish; Kumasi Ade; Dixon; Riddick-Tynes	Riddick-Tynes; Dixon; Dixson^{[v]}	4:17
Total length:				59:39

=== Notes ===
- ^{^[p]} indicates someone credited for primary and vocal production
- ^{^[c]} indicates a co-producer
- ^{^[a]} indicates an additional producer
- ^{^[v]} indicates a vocal producer

== Personnel ==
Credits are adapted from Tidal.

=== Musicians ===
- Kehlani – vocals
- Johnny May – strings (tracks 2, 4, 8, 13, 14, 17)
- Khris Riddick-Tynes – keyboards (2, 5, 7, 8, 13–17), background vocals (2, 7, 8, 13–15, 17), drum programming (2), drums (5, 7, 8, 13–17), synthesizer (7, 8, 15–17), guitar (7), instruments (10), bass (14)
- Alex Goldblatt – bass (2, 8), guitar (11, 13, 15), programming (13); drums, keyboards, synthesizer (15)
- Tom Levesque – horn (2, 8, 13)
- Rich Harrison – background vocals, drum programming (2)
- Ashton Norful – keyboards (2)
- Lil Wayne – vocals (2)
- Clipse – vocals (3)
- Deanna Stewart – background vocals (5, 7, 8, 13, 14, 17)
- Antonio Dixon – bass, keyboards, synthesizer (5, 17); instruments (10), drums (17)
- Jimmy Jam – bass, synthesizer (5)
- Brandy – vocals (5)
- Erick Walls – guitar (6)
- Jeremy Reeves – drums, guitar, keyboards, synthesizer (7)
- Jonathan Yip – drums, guitar, keyboards, synthesizer (7)
- Ray Romulus – drums, guitar, keyboards, synthesizer (7)
- Missy Elliott – vocals (7)
- Dixson – background vocals (8, 13, 15, 17); drums, string arrangement (11)
- Usher – vocals (8)
- Jayme Silverstein – bass, drums, guitar, keyboards (9)
- Oak – drums, keyboards (9)
- Camper – drums, keyboards (11)
- Roy Cotton – string arrangement (11)
- T-Pain – vocals (12)
- Lil Jon – vocals (12)
- Cardi B – vocals (13)
- Allen Ritter – background vocals (14)
- Big Sean – background vocals (14)
- Leon Thomas – vocals (15)
- Daniel Church – background vocals (16)

=== Technical ===
- Jenna Felsenthal – engineering
- Ronald "RD" Dominic – engineering (7)
- Neal Pogue – mixing (all tracks), vocal mixing (7)
- Brad Puette – immersive mixing
- Zachary Acosta – mixing assistance
- Harvey Mason Jr. – vocal mixing (7)
- Mike Bozzi – mastering
- Manny Galvez – vocal engineering (2)
- Rob Ulsh – vocal engineering (3)
- Dixson – vocal engineering (5, 8, 11, 13, 14, 17)
- Todd Bergman – vocal engineering (5)
- Ben "Bengineer" Chang – vocal engineering (8)
- Evan LaRay – vocal engineering (13)
- Milan Becker – vocal engineering (14)

== Charts ==
Chart performance for Kehlani
Chart (2026)	Peak position
Australian Albums (ARIA)	18
Australian Hip Hop/R&B Albums (ARIA)	1
Belgian Albums (Ultratop Flanders)	63
Belgian Albums (Ultratop Wallonia)	75
Canadian Albums (Billboard)	14
Dutch Albums (Album Top 100)	32
French Albums (SNEP)	183
Hungarian Physical Albums (MAHASZ)	12
Japanese Hot Albums (Billboard Japan)	66
New Zealand Albums (RMNZ)	10
Portuguese Albums (AFP)	112
Scottish Albums (Official Charts)	59
Swiss Albums (Schweizer Hitparade)	44
UK Albums (Official Charts)	28
UK R&B Albums (Official Charts)	2
US Billboard 200	4
US Top R&B/Hip-Hop Albums (Billboard)	1
