= BET Award for Video of the Year =

American entertainment award category

BET Awards for Video of the Year
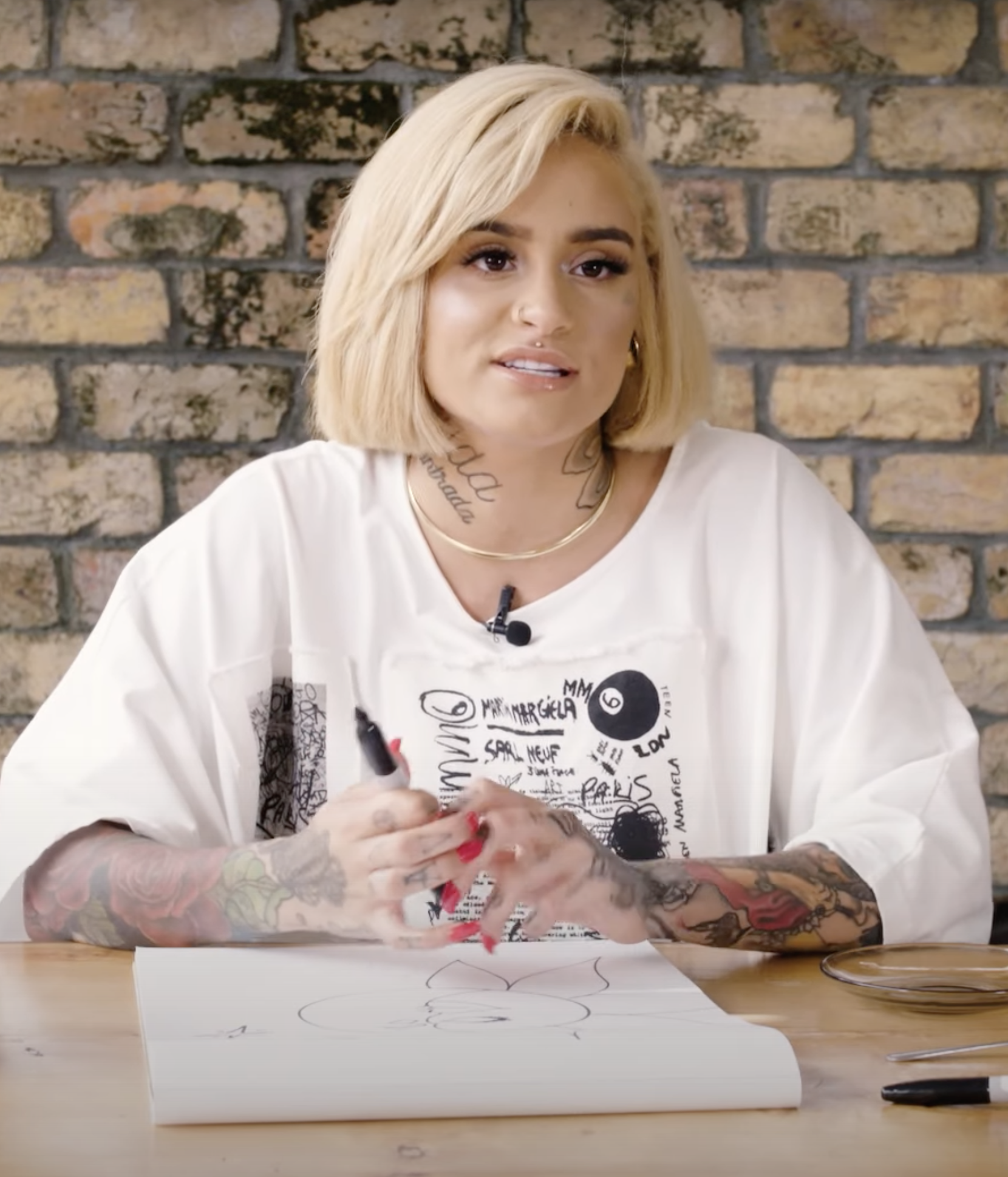
- "Folded" by Kehlani is the most recent recipient
- Country: United States
- Presented by: BET Awards
- First award: 2001
- Currently held by: Kehlani – "Folded" (2026)

Highlights
- Most wins: Beyoncé (6)
- Most nominations: Drake (17)

The BET Award for Video of the Year is given to the most popular music video released the same or previous year of the year the awards are handed out. The award is only given to the performing artist(s) or group in the video. The award is not handed out to the video directors and producers. The all-time winner in this category is Beyoncé with six wins. Drake is the most nominated artist with seventeen nominations. Lady Gaga is the only white artist in history to have won this category for her Beyoncé collaboration "Video Phone".

== Winners and nominees ==
Winners are listed first and highlighted in bold.

=== 2000s ===
Year	Artist	Video	Ref
2001
2001	**Outkast**	**"Ms. Jackson"**	
2001	Destiny's Child	"Independent Women Part I"	
2001	Dr. Dre (feat. Snoop Dogg and Nate Dogg)	"The Next Episode"	
2001	Eminem (feat. Dido)	"Stan"	
2001	Janet Jackson	"All for You"	
2002
2002	**Busta Rhymes (feat. P. Diddy and Pharrell Williams)**	**"Pass the Courvoisier, Part II"**	
2002	Aaliyah	"Rock the Boat"	
2002	Missy Elliott (feat. Ludacris and Trina)	"One Minute Man" (Remix)	
2002	P. Diddy, Black Rob and Mark Curry	"Bad Boy for Life"	
2002	Usher	"U Got It Bad"	
2003
2003	**Erykah Badu (feat. Common)**	**"Love of My Life (An Ode to Hip-Hop)"**	
2003	B2K	"Girlfriend"	
2003	Missy Elliott	"Work It"	
2003	Eminem	"Lose Yourself"	
2003	Nelly	"Hot in Herre"	
2004
2004	**Outkast**	**"Hey Ya!"**	
2004	Beyoncé (feat. Jay-Z)	"Crazy in Love"	
2004	Alicia Keys	"You Don't Know My Name"	
2004	Outkast (feat. Sleepy Brown)	"The Way You Move"	
2004	Usher (feat. Lil' Jon and Ludacris)	"Yeah!"	
2005
2005	**Kanye West**	**"Jesus Walks"**	
2005	Amerie	"1 Thing"	
2005	Jay-Z	"99 Problems"	
2005	John Legend	"Ordinary People"	
2005	Snoop Dogg (feat. Pharrell Williams)	"Drop It Like It's Hot"	
2006
2006	**Mary J. Blige**	**"Be Without You"**	
2006	**Kanye West (feat. Jamie Foxx)**	**"Gold Digger"**	
2006	Beyoncé (feat. Slim Thug and Bun B)	"Check on It"	
2006	Missy Elliott (feat. Ciara and Fatman Scoop)	"Lose Control"	
2006	R. Kelly	"Trapped in the Closet"	
2006	Busta Rhymes (feat. Papoose, Rah Digga, Missy Elliott, DMX, Mary J. Blige and Lloyd Banks)	"Touch It" (Remix)	
2007
2007	**Beyoncé**	**"Irreplaceable"**	
2007	Akon (feat. Snoop Dogg)	"I Wanna Love You"	
2007	Beyoncé and Shakira	"Beautiful Liar"	
2007	Ciara	"Like a Boy"	
2007	Gnarls Barkley	"Crazy"	
2008
2008	**UGK (feat. Outkast)**	**"International Players Anthem (I Choose You)"**	
2008	Ashanti	"The Way That I Love You"	
2008	Erykah Badu	"Honey"	
2008	Mary J. Blige	"Just Fine"	
2008	Alicia Keys	"Like You'll Never See Me Again"	
2008	Kanye West (feat. T-Pain)	"Good Life"	
2009
2009	**Beyoncé**	**"Single Ladies (Put a Ring on It)"**	
2009	Beyoncé	"If I Were a Boy"	
2009	Jamie Foxx (feat. T-Pain)	"Blame It"	
2009	T.I. (feat. Rihanna)	"Live Your Life"	
2009	Kanye West	"Heartless"	

=== 2010s ===
Year	Artist	Video	Ref
2010
2010	**Beyoncé (feat. Lady Gaga)**	**"Video Phone"**	
2010	B.o.B (feat. Bruno Mars)	"Nothin' On You"	
2010	Melanie Fiona	"It Kills Me"	
2010	Jay-Z (feat. Alicia Keys)	"Empire State of Mind"	
2010	Jay-Z (feat. Rihanna and Kanye West)	"Run This Town"	
2011
2011	**Chris Brown (feat. Busta Rhymes and Lil Wayne)**	**"Look at Me Now"**	
2011	Marsha Ambrosius	"Far Away"	
2011	B.o.B (feat. Hayley Williams)	"Airplanes"	
2011	Keri Hilson	"Pretty Girl Rock"	
2011	Willow Smith	"Whip My Hair"	
2011	Kanye West (feat. Pusha T)	"Runaway"	
2012
2012	**Jay-Z and Kanye West (feat. Otis Redding)**	**"Otis"**	
2012	Beyoncé	"Countdown"	
2012	Beyoncé	"Love on Top"	
2012	Jay-Z and Kanye West	"Niggas in Paris"	
2012	Usher	"Climax"	
2013
2013	**Drake**	**"Started from the Bottom"**	
2013	2 Chainz (feat. Drake)	"No Lie"	
2013	ASAP Rocky (feat. Drake, 2 Chainz and Kendrick Lamar)	"Fuckin' Problems"	
2013	Drake (feat. Lil Wayne)	"HYFR (Hell Ya Fucking Right)"	
2013	Kendrick Lamar (feat. Drake)	"Poetic Justice"	
2013	Macklemore and Ryan Lewis (feat. Wanz)	"Thrift Shop"	
2013	Miguel	"Adorn"	
2013	Rihanna	"Diamonds"	
2013	Justin Timberlake (feat. Jay-Z)	"Suit & Tie"	
2013	Kanye West (feat. Big Sean, Pusha T and 2 Chainz)	"Mercy"	
2014
2014	**Pharrell Williams**	**"Happy"**	
2014	Beyoncé	"Partition"	
2014	Beyoncé (feat. Jay-Z)	"Drunk in Love"	
2014	Chris Brown	"Fine China"	
2014	Drake	"Worst Behavior"	
2015
2015	**Beyoncé**	**"7/11"**	
2015	Big Sean (feat. E-40)	"I Don't Fuck with You"	
2015	Chris Brown (feat. Lil Wayne and Tyga)	"Loyal"	
2015	Chris Brown (feat. Usher and Rick Ross)	"New Flame"	
2015	Common and John Legend	"Glory"	
2015	Nicki Minaj	"Anaconda"	
2016
2016	**Beyoncé**	**"Formation"**	
2016	Drake	"Hotline Bling"	
2016	Kendrick Lamar	"Alright"	
2016	Rihanna (feat. Drake)	"Work"	
2016	Bryson Tiller	"Don't"	
2017
2017	**Beyoncé**	**"Sorry"**	
2017	**Bruno Mars**	**"24K Magic"**	
2017	Big Sean	"Bounce Back"	
2017	Migos (feat. Lil Uzi Vert)	"Bad and Boujee"	
2017	Solange	"Cranes in the Sky"	
2018
2018	**Drake**	**"God's Plan"**	
2018	Cardi B	"Bodak Yellow"	
2018	DJ Khaled (feat. Rihanna and Bryson Tiller)	"Wild Thoughts"	
2018	Migos (feat. Drake)	"Walk It Talk It"	
2018	Bruno Mars (feat. Cardi B)	"Finesse (Remix)"	
2018	Kendrick Lamar	"Humble"	
2019
2019	**Childish Gambino**	**"This Is America"**	
2019	21 Savage (feat. J. Cole)	"A Lot"	
2019	Cardi B	"Money"	
2019	Cardi B and Bruno Mars	"Please Me"	
2019	Drake	"Nice for What"	
2019	The Carters	"Apes**t"	

=== 2020s ===
Year	Artist	Video	Ref
2020
2020	**DJ Khaled (feat. Nipsey Hussle and John Legend)**	**"Higher"**	
2020	Chris Brown (feat. Drake)	"No Guidance"	
2020	DaBaby	"Bop"	
2020	Doja Cat	"Say So"	
2020	Megan Thee Stallion (feat. Nicki Minaj and Ty Dolla $ign)	"Hot Girl Summer"	
2020	Roddy Ricch	"The Box"	
2021
2021	**Cardi B (feat. Megan Thee Stallion)**	**"WAP"**	
2021	Cardi B	"Up"	
2021	Chloe x Halle	"Do It"	
2021	Chris Brown and Young Thug	"Go Crazy"	
2021	Drake (feat. Lil Durk)	"Laugh Now Cry Later"	
2021	Silk Sonic	"Leave the Door Open"	
2022
2022	**Baby Keem and Kendrick Lamar**	**"Family Ties"**	
2022	**Silk Sonic**	**"Smokin out the Window"**	
2022	Chlöe	"Have Mercy"	
2022	Doja Cat (feat. SZA)	"Kiss Me More"	
2022	Ari Lennox	"Pressure"	
2022	Drake (feat. Future and Young Thug)	"Way 2 Sexy"	
2023
2023	**SZA**	**"Kill Bill"**	
2023	Peezy, Jeezy & Real Boston Richey (feat. Rob49)	"2 Million Up"	
2023	Lizzo	"About Damn Time"	
2023	Steve Lacy	"Bad Habit"	
2023	Jack Harlow	"First Class"	
2023	GloRilla & Cardi B	"Tomorrow 2"	
2023	Chris Brown	"WE (Warm Embrace)"	
2024
2024	**Victoria Monét**	**"On My Mama"**	
2024	Doja Cat	"Agora Hills"	
2024	Lil Durk (feat. J. Cole)	"All My Life"	
2024	Nicki Minaj & Ice Spice (with Aqua)	"Barbie World"	
2024	Cardi B (feat. Megan Thee Stallion)	"Bongos"	
2024	Drake (feat. J. Cole)	"First Person Shooter"	
2024	Drake featuring Sexyy Red & SZA	"Rich Baby Daddy"	
2025
2025	**Kendrick Lamar**	**"Not Like Us"**	
2025	Key Glock	"3AM in Tokeyo"	
2025	Shaboozey	"A Bar Song (Tipsy)"	
2025	Kehlani	"After Hours"	
2025	Doechii	"Denial is a River"	
2025	Drake	"Family Matters"	
2025	The Weeknd (feat. Playboi Carti)	"Timeless"	
2025	Future, Metro Boomin, Travis Scott & Playboi Carti	"Type Shit"	
2026
2026	**Kehlani**	**"Folded"**	
2026	Ella Mai	"100"	
2026	Doechii	"Anxiety"	
2026	Mariah the Scientist	"Burning Blue"	
2026	Tyla	"Chanel"	
2026	Teyana Taylor	Escape Room (Short Film)	
2026	T.I.	"Let 'Em Know"	
2026	Kendrick Lamar & SZA	"Luther"	

== Multiple wins and nominations ==
=== Wins ===
6 wins

- Beyoncé

3 wins

- Outkast
- Kanye West

2 wins

- Busta Rhymes
- Pharrell Williams
- Drake
- Bruno Mars (including credit as Silk Sonic)

=== Nominations ===
17 nominations

- Drake

14 nominations

- Beyoncé

9 nominations

- Kanye West

8 nominations

- Cardi B
- Jay-Z

7 nominations

- Chris Brown
- Kendrick Lamar

6 nominations

- Bruno Mars (including credit as Silk Sonic)

5 nominations

- Rihanna

4 nominations

- Missy Elliott
- Outkast
- SZA
- Usher

3 nominations

- 2 Chainz
- Big Sean
- Mary J. Blige
- Doja Cat
- J. Cole
- Alicia Keys
- Lil Wayne
- Megan Thee Stallion
- Nicki Minaj
- Busta Rhymes
- Snoop Dogg
- Pharrell Williams

2 nominations

- Erykah Badu
- B.o.B
- Bryson Tiller
- Chlöe (including credit as Chloe x Halle)
- Ciara
- Common
- DJ Khaled
- Doechii
- Eminem
- Jamie Foxx
- Future
- Kehlani
- John Legend
- Lil Durk
- Ludacris
- Migos
- P. Diddy
- Playboi Carti
- Pusha T
- Silk Sonic
- T-Pain
- T.I.
- Young Thug

== See also ==
- BET Award for Video Director of the Year
