= Back and Forth (Kehlani song) =

Single by Kehlani featuring Missy Elliott

from the album Kehlani
- Released: April 10, 2026
- Genre: R&B
- Length: 3:35
- Label: Atlantic
- Songwriters: Kehlani; Melissa Elliott; Khristopher Riddick-Tynes; Jonathan Yip; Ray Romulus; Jeremy Reeves; Ray Charles McCollough II; Ariowa Irosogie
- Producers: Khris Riddick-Tynes; The Stereotypes

Kehlani singles chronology
| "Out the Window" (2025) | "Back and Forth" (2026) | "Shoulda Never" (2026) |

Music video
- "Back and Forth" on YouTube

"Back and Forth" is a song by American singer Kehlani featuring rapper Missy Elliott. It was released on April 10, 2026, as the third single from their self-titled fifth studio album, via Atlantic Records. The song was produced by Tynes and the Stereotypes.

== Background ==
"Back and Forth" was released three months after the album's previous singles "Folded", which became their first top-ten entry on the Billboard Hot 100, and several other chart milestones, peaking at number 6 and won the Grammy Awards for Grammy Award for Best R&B Song and Best R&B Performance, and "Out the Window", that reached in the top-ten in the Rhythmic Airplay and Hot R&B/Hip-Hop Songs.

== Composition ==
The song is mainly about ignoring an argument with your significant other and instead having a night out.

== Music video ==
The music video was released on June 3, 2026, and was directed by Director X. The video features a cameo from Monica.

== Charts ==
Chart performance
| Chart (2026) | Peak position |
|---|---|
| New Zealand Hot Singles (RMNZ) | 10 |
| Nigeria Airplay (TurnTable) | 97 |
| US Bubbling Under Hot 100 (Billboard) | 25 |
| US Hot R&B/Hip-Hop Songs (Billboard) | 39 |
