= Dixson (singer) =

American singer, songwriter, producer, multi-instrumentalist

Darius Scott Dixson
- Born: July 30, 1993 (age 33); Atlanta, Georgia, United States
- Other name: Dixson
- Education: College of Wooster
- Musical career
- Genres: R&B; soul; hip hop; gospel
- Occupations: Singer; songwriter; producer; multi-instrumentalist
- Label: Roc Nation

Darius Scott Dixson, also known as DIXSON, is an American singer, songwriter, producer, and multi-instrumentalist, best known for a Season 9 live playoffs appearance on The Voice (with Team Pharrell), and his co-written and co-produced Academy Award-nominated original song "Be Alive" alongside Beyoncé from the 2021 film King Richard. Scott has also co-written for Mariah Carey, Chance the Rapper, Kehlani, and Vic Mensa, among others, and is a graduate of the College of Wooster.

== Life and career ==
=== Early life ===
Dixson's late father was a pastor, and Dixson quickly learned to play all 11 instruments in their Atlanta church “in case” he had to step in and play. By the age of 5, he had started singing and impressed his parents with a rendition of Fred Hammond’s “When the Spirit of the Lord.” Dixson subsequently attended Ohio's The College of Wooster as a recipient of the prestigious Posse Foundation scholarship. While there, he participated in several ensembles including the Wooster Chorus, The Wooster Fragments, the Wooster Jazz Ensemble, and served as the music director of his on-campus band, Freddie Cool. Throughout Dixson's studies, he held internship roles at MTV and The National Conference of Black Mayors, and was also a founding team member of the streetwear brand Kith. Dixson studied abroad in Paris in 2011, with concentrations in French business and fashion merchandising. He graduated in 2013, with a self-designed major in arts and media management, before moving to Texas to become an executive with Neiman Marcus.

=== 2014–2015: The Voice ===
Dixson released his self-produced Christian/Gospel debut project Masterpiece in November 2014, which was described by him as “the spiritual journey of a young man, challenged by the normative constructs of what is considered faith-based music" in an early Voice contestant profile. Dixson was next a contestant on the Season 9 of The Voice, where he was selected to join Judge Pharrell Williams' team.

Stage	Song	Original Artist	Date	Result
Blind Audition	"You Make Me Wanna..."	Usher	September 29, 2015	Adam Levine, Gwen Stefani and Pharrell Williams turned Joined Team Pharrell
Battle Rounds	"Lean on Me" (vs. Daria Jazmin)	Bill Withers	October 20, 2015	Won
Knockout Rounds	"On Broadway" (vs. Morgan Frazier)	The Drifters	October 27, 2015	Won
Live Playoffs (Top 24)	"Love Lockdown"	Kanye West	November 10, 2015	Eliminated

Non-competition performances
Episode	Performers	Song
17.4	Team Pharrell (Celeste Betton, Darius Scott, Evan McKeel, Madi Davis, Mark Hood, and Riley Biederer)	"Everybody Hurts"

=== 2016–2024: Post-Voice and albums ===
Dixson maintained a relationship with Voice mentor Williams, and began to collaborate with many of his fellow contestants, before self-releasing his electro-R&B album YOUNG in 2018, described as "a journey through the spiritual hills and valleys of a twenty-something year old, finding one's true voice, and pushing beyond one’s perceived artistic limits." He was next contacted to contribute to Chance The Rapper's 2019 album The Big Day, working on a majority of the album in various capacities. In 2020, Dixson vocally arranged the acoustic version of the Justin Bieber and Chance the Rapper collaboration "Holy". Dixson subsequently signed a record deal with label Roc Nation, and released his debut label project Darling. After sending multiple songs to Beyoncé, he was invited to the studio to craft a song for the King Richard film soundtrack that would become Grammy and Academy Award-nominated 2021 single "Be Alive". He later contributed to her album Renaissance (2022), co-writing "Virgo's Groove" and "Pure/Honey". Dixson released his fourth project 004Daisy in 2022, featuring collaborations with Tinashe, Sevyn Streeter, and Vic Mensa, among others. In 2024, Dixson contributed "American Requiiem" and "Amen" to Beyoncé's eighth studio Cowboy Carter, before co-writing or co-producing more than 10 songs for Kehlani's projects Crash and While We Wait 2. Dixson also co-wrote "Bending My Rules" and "Soft" with Darhyl Camper from Flo's debut album Access All Areas, and "Boom Bap" from rapper Doechii's mixtape Alligator Bites Never Heal.

=== 2025–Present: Grammy win ===
In 2025, Dixson co-wrote Doechii single "Girl, Get Up" featuring SZA, as well as Kehlani single "Folded", which became their first single to reach the top ten of the Billboard Hot 100 chart. In 2026, Dixson won the Best R&B Song Grammy for his writing contributions to "Folded" at the 68th Annual Grammy Awards.

== Discography ==
=== Studio albums ===
- Masterpiece (2014)
- Young (2018)
- Darling (2021)
- 004Daisy (2022)

=== Guest appearances ===
List of guest appearances, with other performing artists, showing year released and album name
Title	Year	Other performer(s)	Album
"No Way"	2017	Jor'dan Armstrong	Vibes
"Go"	2018	Keyondra Lockett	Non-album single
"Zanies and Fools"	2019	Chance the Rapper & Nicki Minaj	The Big Day
"Trust"	2019	MavTraxx & Adarian Roberts	Family Ties
"Take It Slow"	2019	Danielle Juhre	Non-album single
"Young Love Games" (Background Vocals)	2019	Grace Weber	Non-album single
"Distance" (Background Vocals)	2020	Yebba	Dawn
"Carousel"	2020	Bosco	Car Therapy
"Rebirth"	2020	Vic Mensa, BJ the Chicago Kid & Peter CottonTale	V Tape
"Do Your Thing"	2020	Peter CottonTale, Lil Rel Howery & Reeseynem	Catch
"Prayer"	2020	Peter CottonTale, Hoko & Jack Red	Catch
"Be Alive"	2021	Beyoncé	King Richard (soundtrack)
"Introduction"	2021	Vic Mensa	I Tape
"D'usse Tears"	2022	Vic Mensa & Malik Yusef	Vino Valentino
"California Taxi"	2022	INAYAH	Insecure
"Sunday Evening Reprise"	2023	Vic Mensa & Lekan	Victor
"Slow Dance"	2024	Kehlani	While We Wait 2
"Bending My Rules [Unlocked]"	2024	Flo	Access All Areas
"Pocket" (featuring Cardi B) (Background Vocals)	2026	Kehlani	Kehlani
"Sweet Nuthins" (featuring Leon Thomas) (Background Vocals)	2026	Kehlani	Kehlani
"Unlearn" (Background Vocals)	2026	Kehlani	Kehlani

== Selected songwriting and production credits ==
Credits are courtesy of Discogs, Tidal, Apple Music, and AllMusic.

Title	Year	Artist	Album
"Veins"	2016	Madi Davis	Above The Waves
"All Day Long" (featuring John Legend)	2019	Chance the Rapper	The Big Day
"Eternal" (featuring Smino)	2019	Chance the Rapper	The Big Day
"We Go High"	2019	Chance the Rapper	The Big Day
"The Big Day" (featuring Francis and the Lights)	2019	Chance the Rapper	The Big Day
"Let's Go on the Run" (featuring Knox Fortune)	2019	Chance the Rapper	The Big Day
"Ballin Flossin" (featuring Shawn Mendes)	2019	Chance the Rapper	The Big Day
"5 Year Plan" (featuring Randy Newman)	2019	Chance the Rapper	The Big Day
"Sun Come Down"	2019	Chance the Rapper	The Big Day
"Found a Good One (Single No More)" (featuring SWV & Pretty Vee)	2019	Chance the Rapper	The Big Day
"He's Real P.1"	2020	Peter CottonTale	Catch
"Pray for Real" (Featuring Chance the Rapper & Tobi Lou)	2020	Peter CottonTale	Catch
"He's Real P.2"	2020	Peter CottonTale	Catch
"The Return" (With Chance the Rapper)	2020	Jeremih	Merry Christmas Lil' Mama: The Gift That Keeps On Giving
"Petal"	2020	BOSCO	Some Day This Will All Make Sense
"Take Off"	2020	BOSCO	Some Day This Will All Make Sense
"Millionaires"	2021	Vic Mensa	I Tape
"Always Something"	2022	INAYAH	Insecure
"Pretty Ugly"	2022	INAYAH	Insecure
"Killa Mode" (Featuring Storm Ford)	2022	Westside Boogie	More Black Superheroes
"Nonchalant" (Featuring Mamii)	2022	Westside Boogie	More Black Superheroes
"Can't Even Lie" (With Soulja Boy)	2022	Westside Boogie	More Black Superheroes
"Prideful II"	2022	Westside Boogie	More Black Superheroes
"Can't Get Over You" (With Smino & Teezo Touchdown)	2022	Westside Boogie	More Black Superheroes
"Windows Down" (Featuring Snoop Dogg)	2022	Westside Boogie	More Black Superheroes
"Anthony (War)"	2022	Westside Boogie	More Black Superheroes
"Virgo's Groove"	2022	Beyoncé	Renaissance
"Pure/Honey"	2022	Beyoncé	Renaissance
"American Requiem"	2024	Beyoncé	Cowboy Carter
"Amen"	2024	Beyoncé	Cowboy Carter
"GrooveTheory"	2024	Kehlani	Crash
"Next 2 U"	2024	Kehlani	Crash
"8"	2024	Kehlani	Crash
"Sucia" (featuring Jill Scott and Young Miko)	2024	Kehlani	Crash
"Vegas"	2024	Kehlani	Crash
"Deep"	2024	Kehlani	Crash
"Chapel"	2024	Kehlani	Crash
"Lose My Wife"	2024	Kehlani	Crash
"Love Like"	2024	Kehlani	While We Wait 2
"S.I.N.G.L.E"	2024	Kehlani	While We Wait 2
"Let Me Down" (San Diego Interlude)	2024	Kehlani	While We Wait 2
"8 Remix" (featuring Flo)	2024	Kehlani	While We Wait 2
"Boom Bap"	2024	Doechii	Alligator Bites Never Heal
"Bending My Rules"	2024	Flo	Access All Areas
"Soft"	2024	Flo	Access All Areas
"Sugar Sweet" (featuring Kehlani and Shenseea)	2025	Mariah Carey	Here for It All
"Folded"	2025	Kehlani	Kehlani
"Believe in Magic / Joy (Interlude)"	2025	Jessie J	Don't Tease Me with a Good Time
"Colourful"	2025	Jessie J	Don't Tease Me with a Good Time
"Girl, Get Up" (featuring SZA)	2026	Doechii	TBA
"Shoulda Never" (featuring Usher)	2026	Kehlani	Kehlani
"Still"	2026	Kehlani	Kehlani
"Morning Dew (Donk)"	2026	Beyoncé	B'Day: 20th Anniversary Edition
"Without You"	2026	Tori Kelly	God Must Really Love Me
"Haterbooth"	2026	Flo	Therapy at the Club
"You Mean The World To Me" (featuring Hazel Monét & Leon Thomas)	2026	Victoria Monét	Frequency of Love

== Filmography ==
=== Television ===
Year	Title	Role	Notes	Ref.
2015	The Voice	Himself	Live Playoffs Contestant	
2022	2022 Soul Train Music Awards	Himself	"Cherry Sorbet" Performance	

=== Music videos ===
- "Big Brave Man" (2020)
- "Kream" (2021)
- "Yours" (2021)
- "Darling" (2021)
- "Cherry Sorbet" (2022)
- "Barely" (2023)

== Awards and nominations ==
Year	Ceremony	Award	Result	Ref
2021	Hollywood Music in Media Awards	Best Original Song in a Feature Film ("Be Alive")	Nominated	
2022	Academy Awards	Best Original Song ("Be Alive")	Nominated	
2022	Black Reel Awards	Outstanding Original Song ("Be Alive")	Nominated	
2022	Critics' Choice Awards	Best Song ("Be Alive")	Nominated	
2022	Golden Globe Awards	Best Original Song ("Be Alive")	Nominated	
2022	Hollywood Critics Association Awards	Best Original Song ("Be Alive")	Won	
2022	Satellite Awards	Best Original Song ("Be Alive")	Nominated	
2022	Soul Train Music Awards	Best New Artist	Nominated	
2023	65th Annual Grammy Awards	Best Song Written for Visual Media ("Be Alive")	Nominated	
2023	65th Annual Grammy Awards	Album of the Year (Renaissance)	Nominated	
2026	68th Annual Grammy Awards	Best R&B Song ("Folded")	Won	
2027	69th Annual Grammy Awards	Best Rap Song ("Girl, Get Up")	Nominated	
