= Be Alive =

2021 single by Beyoncé

Single by Beyoncé
- Released: November 12, 2021
- Length: 3:39
- Label: Parkwood; Columbia
- Songwriters: Beyoncé Knowles-Carter; DIXSON
- Producers: Beyoncé; DIXSON

Beyoncé singles chronology
"Black Parade" (2020)	"Be Alive" (2021)	"Break My Soul" (2022)

Lyric video
- "Be Alive" on YouTube

"Be Alive" is a song by American singer Beyoncé. It was written and produced by Beyoncé and DIXSON for the 2021 biographical drama film King Richard. It was released on November 12, 2021, through Parkwood Entertainment.

The song received critical acclaim and was nominated for several awards, including the Golden Globe Award for Best Original Song, Critics' Choice Movie Award for Best Song, and the Academy Award for Best Original Song, becoming Beyoncé's first nomination for the latter. The song eventually won a Hollywood Critics Association Award for Best Original Song.

== Background and production ==
"Be Alive" was recorded by American singer Beyoncé for the 2021 biographical drama film King Richard, which chronicles the story of Richard Williams (Will Smith) as he coaches his daughters, tennis players Venus and Serena Williams.

Beyoncé decided to write a song for King Richard after attending a screening of the film and becoming inspired by Venus and Serena Williams. Will Smith commented on the song that "the marriage of a movie and a song is a kind of magic that's unmatched in entertainment". Serena explained that "there was no other person who could do this song except for Beyoncé" and "there was just no doubt in [Beyoncé's] mind that it belonged to her as well". Serena noted how she and Venus have had a similar path to Beyoncé in their lives; all three trained since a young age to reach their goals, with both of their parents being highly involved in their careers.

Beyoncé reached out to DIXSON and the two co-wrote the song in a collaborative process. DIXSON commented: "Obviously, we all know if Beyoncé sings, it's going to be amazing. But I don't think we talk about her ability as a songwriter and a producer enough. I knew she was one of my favorite songwriters, but it was confirmed for me through this process."

== Release and promotion ==
"Be Alive" plays during King Richard's end credits, which feature archival footage of the real Williams family. The film premiered at the Telluride Film Festival on September 2, 2021, and released on November 19, 2021. The song was also premiered at the festival, to the surprise of attendees. The song was greeted with cheers from the attendees of the film's premiere at the BFI London Film Festival. On October 21, 2021, the "Official 'Be Alive' Trailer" of King Richard was released, which features a teaser of the song. The teaser of the song was shared by the Williams sisters and Will Smith on social media. The song was then performed at her private show at Atlantis the Royal in Dubai in 2023.

Beyoncé did not promote the song following its release, making no awards campaign stops. Beyoncé later performed the song at the 94th Academy Awards. Variety reported that Beyoncé was in talks to broadcast the performance live from the tennis courts in Compton where Venus and Serena practiced as children. The performance was later uploaded on Beyonce's YouTube Channel.

== Composition ==
The song has inspirational and empowering lyrics and recalls the journey that the Williams sisters have taken throughout their careers. The lyrics include messages on black pride, sisterhood and family, which link to the themes of King Richard. Musically, the song is a powerful ballad with a drum-heavy beat, guitar licks and grizzly bass. Beyoncé's vocals are described as "epic", "powerful" and "soaring", and are backed by layered vocal harmonies.

== Critical reception ==
"Be Alive" received critical acclaim upon release. Jason Lipshutz of Billboard described the release of "Be Alive" as "an event", lauding Beyoncé's "singular voice and lush harmonies" and the lyrics which "radiate pride and beauty as a celebration of Black art and culture". Variety's Clayton Davis described the song as a "very uplifting" conclusion to King Richard, comparing it to the 2014 song "Glory" from Selma, while Jazz Tangcay of the same publication described it as "a soaring ballad that fits like a glove on the movie". Writing for Bustle, Hugh McIntyre described the track as "fantastic, modern and original", highlighting its "great composition, one that's solid and empowering in all the right ways". Rachael O'Connor of Metro described the track as "an unmistakable Beyoncé anthem", praising her vocal performance and "powerful" lyricism. Writing for the Los Angeles Times, Glenn Whipp characterized the song as "an instantly engaging original number" and called it the highlight of the film's premiere. Yohana Desta of Vanity Fair described the "anthemic" song as a "thumping, beautifully harmonized motivational number", while Meryl Prendergast of Hot Press characterized it as a "heart-stopping" and "iconic anthem".

"Be Alive" was nominated for Best Original Song at the 94th Academy Awards.

== Awards and nominations ==
Year	Ceremony	Award	Result	Ref(s).
2021	Hollywood Music in Media Awards	Best Original Song in a Feature Film	Nominated	
2022	Academy Awards	Best Original Song	Nominated	
2022	Black Reel Awards	Outstanding Original Song	Nominated	
2022	Critics' Choice Awards	Best Song	Nominated	
2022	Golden Globe Awards	Best Original Song	Nominated	
2022	Hollywood Critics Association Awards	Best Original Song	Won	
2022	Satellite Awards	Best Original Song	Nominated	
2023	Grammy Awards	Best Song Written for Visual Media	Nominated	

== Credits and personnel ==
- Beyoncé – vocals, songwriting, production
- DIXSON – songwriting, production
- Stuart White – recording, mixing
- Colin Leonard – mastering

== Charts ==
Chart performance for "Be Alive"
Chart (2021)	Peak position
New Zealand Hot Singles (RMNZ)	36
South Africa (RISA)	99
US Digital Song Sales (Billboard)	40
