= While We Wait 2 =

Mixtape by Kehlani
- Released: August 28, 2024
- Recorded: July 2024
- Genre: R&B
- Length: 51:46
- Labels: TSNMI; Atlantic
- Producers: Alex Goldblatt; AJ Tucci; Ambezza; Budde; Camper; D. Phelps; DBT; Dillon; Dixson; Gabriel Labrinth; Jack Rochon; Khris Riddick-Tynes; Kwn; Mamii; Nick; Nik D; Saxon; Scribz Riley; XJD

Kehlani chronology
Crash (2024)	While We Wait 2 (2024)	Kehlani (2026)

Singles from While We Wait 2
- 1. "When He's Not There" Released: August 26, 2024

While We Wait 2 is the third commercial and fourth mixtape by American singer Kehlani, released on August 28, 2024. The mixtape serves as a sequel to Kehlani's 2019 mixtape While We Wait, and is their second project of 2024, following the release of their fourth album Crash, just two months prior. The mixtape features guest appearances from Lucky Daye, Lil' Mo, Vince Staples, Destin Conrad, Dixson, Flo and Ludmilla.

== Background ==
In February 2019, Kehlani released their third mixtape While We Wait, which was to bridge the gap between their debut album SweetSexySavage and their upcoming sophomore album at the time, which would become It Was Good Until It Wasn't. On July 17, 2024, a month after the release of their fourth album Crash, Kehlani started to tease the mixtape's sequel via Instagram. Kehlani then revealed 10 days later on July 26 that the mixtape was completed and was moving onto the mixing process. They also played a preview of the track "Know Better", which had been in the works since 2019. Kehlani continued to share snippets from the mixtape, including a song titled "First Life".

The mixtape's cover and release date was revealed on August 21, 2024, with the track listing being revealed two days later on August 23.

== Singles ==
Kehlani released the first single "When He's Not There" featuring American singer Lucky Daye on August 26, 2024, two days prior to the mixtape's release.

== Track listing ==
While We Wait 2 track listing
No.	Title	Writer(s)	Producer(s)	Length
1.	"Love Like"	Kehlani Parrish; Darius Dixson Scott; David Phelps; Shawntoni Nichols	D. Phelps; Dixson; Mamii	2:08
2.	"When He's Not There" (featuring Lucky Daye)	Parrish; David DeBrandon Brown; Dustin Bowie; Mike McGregor; Dylan Wiggins; Benjamin Oldman; Morgan Belanger; Mathias Daniel Liyew; Nik Dejan Frascona	Dillon; Ambezza; Nik D	4:28
3.	"Clothes Off" (featuring Kwn)	Parrish; Khy Wilson	Kwn	3:49
4.	"S.I.N.G.L.E"	Parrish; Scott	Dixson	3:56
5.	"Know Better" (featuring Lil' Mo and Vince Staples)	Parrish; David Obata Teel; Faraji Wright; Vincent Staples	DBT; XJD	3:22
6.	"Border"	Parrish; Jack Rochon; Wilson; Morgan Belanger	Jack Rochon	3:14
7.	"Form of You" (featuring Destin Conrad and ChildofNines)	Parrish; Darhyl Camper, Jr.; Destin Conrad; Diovanna Frazier; Tyanna Braswell	Camper	4:22
8.	"Let Me Down" (San Diego Interlude)	Parrish; Scott; Conrad; Nichols		3:30
9.	"Around"	Parrish; Teel; AJ Tucci; Benjamin Oldham	AJ Tucci; DBT; Nick	3:36
10.	"Ballin'"	Parrish; Camper, Jr.; Klara Mkhatshwa Munk-Hanseb; Marteen; Nichols		2:59
11.	"First Life"	Parrish; Wilson; Michael Orabiyi; Belanger	Scribz Riley; Budde; Gabriel Labrinth; Saxon	4:14
12.	"Slow Dance" (featuring Dixson)	Parrish; Camper, Jr.; Scott	Camper; Dixson	5:43
13.	"8" (Remix, featuring Flo)	Parrish; Scott; Anthony Clemons Jr.; Jorja Douglas; Renée Downer; Stella Quaresma	Dixson	2:51
14.	"After Hours" (remix, featuring Ludmilla)	Parrish; Ludmila Oliveira da Silva; Khristopher Riddick-Tynes; Alex Goldblatt; Daniel Upchurch; Frazier; Cordel Burrell	Khris Riddick-Tynes; Goldblatt	3:27
Total length:				51:46
