= Khris Riddick-Tynes =

American songwriter, producer

- Born: Khristopher Van Riddick-Tynes; Los Angeles, California, United States
- Education: Loyola Marymount University (BA) (JD)
- Genres: Hip-hop; r&b; soul
- Occupations: Songwriter; producer; record label executive; a&r
- Label: Arista Records
- Member of: The Rascals

Khris Riddick-Tynes is an American songwriter, record producer, and record label executive. Tynes achieved success in the 2010s as a member of the production duo the Rascals alongside Leon Thomas III, co-writing and co-producing for artists including Kehlani, Ariana Grande, Rick Ross, SZA, and Toni Braxton. Riddick-Tynes is currently the vice president of A&R and co-head of urban music at Arista Records.

== Career ==
=== Musical beginnings ===
Riddick-Tynes grew up in a musical household: his grandmother, Maria Tynes, was a songwriter and pianist in the 1960s signed to Capitol Records, and his father, Kenny Tynes, worked with Randy Jackson’s group Randy & The Gypsys on their self-titled album. While attending college at Loyola Marymount University, Riddick-Tynes taught himself how to produce beats, and began working with local artists, building a network that led him to being recognized by his now mentor and frequent collaborator, Kenneth “Babyface” Edmonds.

=== Production career ===
Riddick-Tynes met artist Kehlani after discovering her music online, and also met emerging artist Ariana Grande, working with them on early work alongside Thomas, forming production group "The Rascals". These sessions with Grande evolved into her debut studio album Yours Truly. Riddick-Tynes would later sign a global publishing agreement with Reservoir Media. Riddick-Tynes continued working with Edmonds, collaborating with him on several projects including his 2022 studio album Girls Night Out.

Riddick-Tynes later returned to LMU, completing his juris doctor in 2022. In 2023, Riddick-Tynes reunited with Edmonds and Thomas to create "Snooze" alongside SZA, receiving a Grammy for Best R&B Song. In 2026, Riddick-Tynes won his second Grammy award for Best R&B Song for his work on Kehlani's "Folded". He is currently working on new music for Chinese recording artist Tia Ray.

== Discography ==
=== Executive-produced/co-written projects ===
Albums with ~ 50% Kristopher Riddick-Tynes production/songwriting credits or more
Album	Artist	Year	Label
Kehlani	Kehlani	2026	Atlantic Records

=== Selected songwriting & production credits ===
Title	Year	Artist	Album
"One Up for Love"	2011	Boyz II Men	Twenty
"Honeymoon Avenue"	2013	Ariana Grande	Yours Truly
"Tattooed Heart"	2013	Ariana Grande	Yours Truly
"Lovin' It"	2013	Ariana Grande	Yours Truly
"You'll Never Know"	2013	Ariana Grande	Yours Truly
"Love Is Everything"	2013	Ariana Grande	Christmas Kisses
"Snow in California"	2013	Ariana Grande	Christmas Kisses
"I'd Rather Be Broke"	2014	Toni Braxton & Babyface	Love, Marriage & Divorce
"Every Day Is Christmas"	2015	The Braxtons	Braxton Family Christmas
"Shake That" (featuring Pitbull)	2015	Samantha Jade	Nine
"Can I Get a Moment?"	2015	Jessica Mauboy	Beautiful: Platinum Edition
"The Day Before I Met You"	2015	Jessica Mauboy	Beautiful: Platinum Edition
"Something New" (featuring Chris Brown)	2016	Zendaya	Non-album single
"I Can't Be Mad"	2016	Nathan Sykes	Unfinished Business
"Scar"	2016	Foxes	All I Need
"Sex & Cigarettes"	2018	Toni Braxton	Sex & Cigarettes
"Body Count (Remix)" (featuring Normani & Kehlani)	2018	Jessie Reyez	Being Human in Public
"Butterfly"	2019	Kehlani	While We Wait
"Emerald / Burgundy" (featuring Juvenile & Juicy J)	2019	Chris Brown	Indigo
"Summer Magic"	2019	Ai	It's All Me, Vol. 1
"Gold Roses" (featuring Drake)	2019	Rick Ross	Port of Miami 2
"Grieving" (featuring James Blake)	2020	Kehlani	It Was Good Until It Wasn't
"Safety Net" (featuring Ty Dolla Sign)	2020	Ariana Grande	Positions
"Nasty"	2020	Ariana Grande	Positions
"One Time" (featuring Toosii)	2020	Queen Naija	Missunderstood
"25 in Barcelona"	2020	JP Saxe	Hold It Together
"Love All" (featuring Jay-Z)	2021	Drake	Certified Lover Boy
"Not Another Love Song"	2022	Ella Mai	Heart on My Sleeve
"Our Song"	2022	Ella Mai	Heart on My Sleeve
"Seamless" (featuring Kehlani)	2022	Babyface	Girls Night Out
"Keeps on Fallin'" (featuring Ella Mai)	2022	Babyface	Girls Night Out
"Game Over" (with Queen Naija)	2022	Babyface	Girls Night Out
"Say Less" (with Tiana Major9)	2022	Babyface	Girls Night Out
"The Recipe" (with Muni Long)	2022	Babyface	Girls Night Out
"I.J.S"	2022	Vory	Lost Souls
"Snooze" (solo or featuring Justin Bieber)	2022	SZA	SOS
"My Love" featuring Ayra Starr)	2023	Leigh-Anne	Non-album single
"Uuhh"	2023	Teezo Touchdown	How Do You Sleep at Night?
"Fatal Attraction"	2023	6lack	Since I Have a Lover
"After Hours" (solo or featuring Ludmilla)	2024	Kehlani	Crash
"Crash"	2024	Kehlani	Crash
"Anticipate"	2024	Leigh-Anne	No Hard Feelings
"Dirt On My Shoes" (with Kehlani)	2025	Leon Thomas	Mutt Deluxe: HEEL
"Too Much to Say"	2025	JoJo	NGL
"Folded"	2025	Kehlani	Kehlani
"Out the Window"	2025	Kehlani	Kehlani
"Goodbye Goodmorning"	2026	Leigh-Anne	My Ego Told Me To
"Back and Forth" (featuring Missy Elliott)	2026	Kehlani	Kehlani

== Awards and nominations ==
Year	Ceremony	Award	Result	Ref
2020	62nd Annual Grammy Awards	Grammy Award for Best Rap Song ("Gold Roses")	Nominated	
2024	66th Annual Grammy Awards	Grammy Award for Best R&B Song ("Snooze")	Won	
2025	67th Annual Grammy Awards	Grammy Award for Best R&B Song ("After Hours")	Nominated	
2026	68th Annual Grammy Awards	Grammy Award for Best R&B Song ("Folded")	Won	
