= Kehlani =

American singer-songwriter (born 1995)

- Kehlani in 2026

Background information
- Born: Kehlani Ashley Parrish; April 24, 1995 (age 31); Oakland, California, U.S.
- Education: Oakland School for the Arts
- Genres: R&B; pop; hip-hop; neo soul
- Occupations: Singer-songwriter; dancer
- Works: Discography
- Years active: 2009–present
- Labels: Tsunami Mob; Atlantic; HBK
- Member of: the HBK Gang
- Formerly of: PopLyfe
- Partner: Kwn (2024–present)
- Children: 1
- Website: kehlani.com

Kehlani Ashley Parrish (/keɪˈlɑːni/ kay-LAH-nee; born April 24, 1995) is an American singer, songwriter and dancer. They (Note: Kehlani uses both she/her and they/them pronouns and switches between them. This article uses they/them for consistency.) initially started as a member of the teen pop group PopLyfe in 2011 as a contestant on America's Got Talent. After leaving the group, Parrish self-released the mixtapes Cloud 19 (2014) and You Should Be Here (2015), both of which were critically acclaimed and received gold certifications by the Recording Industry Association of America (RIAA), while the latter marked their first entry on the US Billboard 200 and was nominated for Best Urban Contemporary Album at the 58th Annual Grammy Awards.

Kehlani signed with Atlantic Records to release their debut studio album, SweetSexySavage (2017), which peaked at number three on the Billboard 200, while their second, It Was Good Until It Wasn't (2020), peaked at number two. Their third album, Blue Water Road (2022), peaked at number 13 on the chart and was met with critical acclaim, while their fourth, Crash (2024), peaked at number 25. Their 2025 single, "Folded", from their eponymous fifth album, Kehlani (2026), peaked at number six on the Billboard Hot 100 and won Best R&B Performance and Best R&B Song at the 68th Annual Grammy Awards.

== Early life ==
Kehlani Ashley Parrish was born on April 24, 1995, in Oakland, California. They were adopted and raised by their aunt when their mother, who had a drug addiction, served time in jail. Kehlani's father, who also had a drug addiction, died when they were a toddler. During their teenage years, they attended the Oakland School for the Arts, where they initially practiced dance, particularly ballet and modern dance.

Early in their life, Kehlani aspired to train as a dancer at the Juilliard School, but they had a knee injury in junior high, which led them to turn their attention towards singing. While living with their aunt, Kehlani was exposed almost exclusively to R&B and neo soul artists, such as Lauryn Hill, Erykah Badu and Jill Scott, whom today they describe as some of their early musical influences. When they were 14, Kehlani was recruited to join a local pop cover band, PopLyfe.

== Career ==
=== 2009–2013: Beginnings with PopLyfe ===
Kehlani's singing career effectively began when they started out as a member and lead vocalist for the group called PopLyfe. The band's music was produced by former Tony! Toni! Tone! member D'Wayne Wiggins. Within two years, the group performed throughout the Bay Area and other cities. In 2011, they auditioned for the sixth season of America's Got Talent, and eventually finished in fourth place. During their final appearance, judge Piers Morgan told Kehlani, "You've got real talent, but I don't think you need the group."

After the end of America's Got Talent, Kehlani left PopLyfe, because of several managerial and contractual disputes. Over six months, they avoided doing anything music related to avoid being sued by the group's management. In 2012 and 2013, Kehlani was effectively homeless, moving from house to house and often sleeping on couches. During their senior year of high school, they moved to Los Angeles, California, with no legal guardian. In 2013, Nick Cannon, who had been the host of America's Got Talent during PopLyfe's run, called Kehlani to ask about being in a rap group. They agreed at first and went to Los Angeles, but, ultimately didn't like the direction of the group and moved back to Oakland. To help with money and food, they decided to begin stealing iPhones to sell, and items from grocery stores for a short time. Months later, Kehlani released their first solo track on SoundCloud, called "ANTISUMMERLUV". Cannon called back after hearing the song and he bought them an apartment in LA, along with studio time.

=== 2014–2017: SweetSexySavage ===
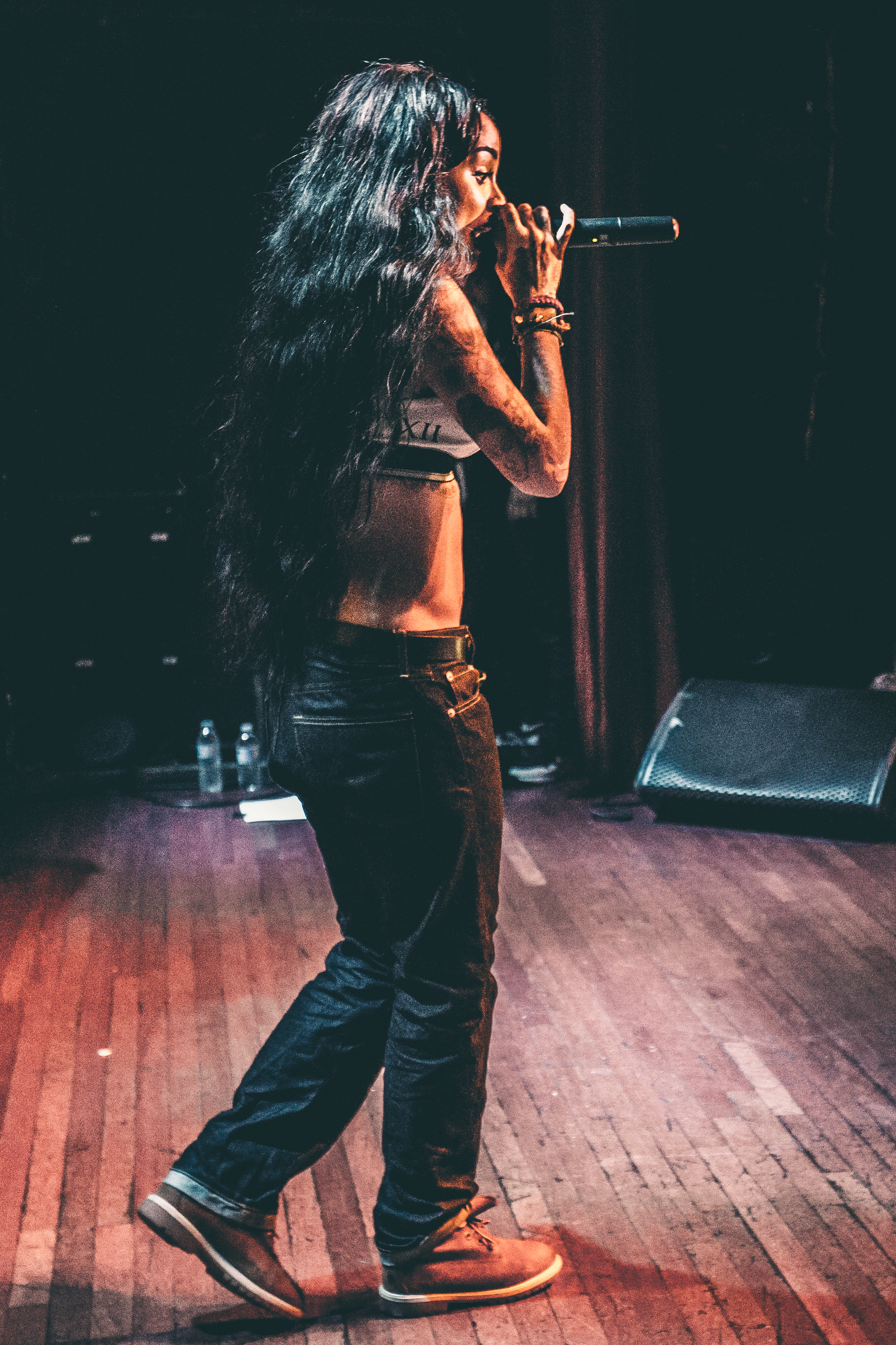
Kehlani performing in 2015

In 2014, the studio time culminated in the release of their first mixtape, called Cloud 19. The mixtape features guest appearances from Kyle Dion. Cannon also sent them to New York City to work with record producer Jahaan Sweet. The mixtape ranked at twenty-eighth on Complex's list of the "50 Best Albums of 2014," and was also listed among Pitchfork's "Overlooked Mixtapes 2014." A song they released in late 2014, "Till the Morning" was placed by Billboard as one of the "Emerging Picks of the Week" on November 7, 2014. In 2015, Kehlani opened for American rapper G-Eazy on the second leg of his From the Bay to the Universe tour.

On April 28, 2015, they released their second mixtape You Should Be Here. Billboard called it the "year's first great R&B album", when it debuted at number five on Billboard's Top R&B/Hip-Hop Albums chart. The project featured guest appearances from fellow American rapper Chance the Rapper and American singer BJ the Chicago Kid. A week after the release, they announced that they had signed a deal to Atlantic Records. In support of the mixtape, they embarked on the You Should Be Here tour, which sold out every North American date and select European dates. Throughout 2015, they also received individual plaudits: Complex called their one of the "15 Artists to Watch Out for in 2015" and Rolling Stone named them one of the "10 New Artists You Need to Know". You Should Be Here also earned a Grammy Award nomination for Best Urban Contemporary Album. In March 2016, Kehlani guest featured on English singer Zayn's single "Wrong" from his debut solo studio album Mind of Mine. Their song "Gangsta" was featured on the soundtrack for the August 2016 hit movie Suicide Squad, which gave them and their music some beneficial recognition, as it reached number 41 on the Hot 100.

On November 26, 2016, Kehlani revealed the title of their debut studio album SweetSexySavage, which was released on Atlantic Records on January 27, 2017. In December 2017, Kehlani guest featured on American rapper Eminem's single "Nowhere Fast" from his ninth studio album Revival. Kehlani's third annual Tsunami Christmas tour concluded in Santa Ana, California on December 18, 2017.

=== 2018–2023: It Was Good Until It Wasn't and Blue Water Road ===
Kehlani served as an opening act on American singer Demi Lovato's Tell Me You Love Me World Tour in North America, which started on February 26, 2018, and concluded on April 2. They then opened on American singer Halsey's Hopeless Fountain Kingdom World Tour on the Oceania leg during April 2018. In March 2018, Kehlani guest featured on American singer Charlie Puth's single "Done for Me" from his second studio album, Voicenotes. In April 2018, they guest-featured on American rapper Cardi B's single "Ring" from her debut studio album, Invasion of Privacy. The song peaked at number 28 on the Billboard Hot 100, becoming Kehlani's first song to enter the top 40 of the chart.

On February 22, 2019, their third commercial mixtape While We Wait was released by Atlantic Records and debuted at number nine on the Billboard 200 and sold 34,000 album-equivalent units in its first week. It was supported by the singles "Nights Like This" featuring Ty Dolla Sign, "Nunya" featuring Dom Kennedy, and "Butterfly".

On September 27, 2019, Kehlani and Russian-German DJ Zedd released the collaborative single "Good Thing." Kehlani and American singer Teyana Taylor's then released the single "Morning" in November of that year.

On January 28, 2020, Kehlani guest-featured on singer Justin Bieber's promotional single "Get Me" from his fifth studio album, Changes. They were also set to be a supporting act alongside American rapper and singer Jaden Smith for Bieber's Changes Tour, which was pushed back due to the COVID-19 pandemic. The tour was pushed back to 2022 and renamed the Justice World Tour to support both Changes and its successor, Bieber's sixth studio album, Justice (2021), although Kehlani was dropped as an opening act. Kehlani released their second studio album, It Was Good Until It Wasn't on May 8, 2020. It debuted at number two on the US Billboard 200, based on 83,000 album-equivalent units earned (including 25,000 copies of pure album sales).

In September 2020, Kehlani recorded songs for the deluxe version of It Was Good Until It Wasn't. However, after the session they decided that the songs would fit better on a separate project, and began working on their third studio album, Blue Water Road. On September 14, 2021, Kehlani revealed the teaser for Blue Water Road, and announced that the album will be released later that year. The album's lead single "Altar" was released on September 15. The second single, "Little Story", was released on February 24, 2022. On March 30, Kehlani released "Up at Night", featuring Justin Bieber, as the third single from the album, while the album was confirmed for an April 29 release.

To support the album, Kehlani embarked on the Blue Water Road Trip tour in the US and Europe from July to December 2022. The tour had opening acts Rico Nasty and Destin Conrad. In 2023, Kehlani was the headliner for concert performances at the 2023 WNBA All-Star Game and the 2023 MLS All-Star Game.

=== 2024–present: Crash, While We Wait 2 and Kehlani ===
On April 4, 2024, Kehlani released the lead single "After Hours" ahead of their next album. Kehlani affirmed their support for Palestine, expressing their stance in their music video "Next 2 U". The video, which premiered on May 31, 2024, began with a poem by Palestinian-American writer Hala Alyan and the demonstration chant "Long Live the Intifada", an allusion to the 1987 uprising against Israeli occupation of the West Bank and Gaza Strip. In the music video's outro, Kehlani vocalized a personally penned message dedicated to the Palestinian children who were killed in the Gaza war. Kehlani's fourth album, Crash, was released on June 21, 2024, and featured collaborations with Jill Scott, Omah Lay and Young Miko. Their fourth mixtape, While We Wait 2, was released on August 28, 2024. It included 14 songs with features from Lucky Daye, kwn, Vince Staples, FLO, Destin Conrad, Lil' Mo, and DIXSON. Kehlani states that the album only took two weeks to record and was done all at home. The cover art nods to the original While We Wait album cover, featuring them staring at themself in the mirror with a floral wallpaper in the background. They also collaborated with GloRilla on a Christmas-themed trap song, which was released on December 13, 2024.

On June 11, 2025, Kehlani released the single "Folded"; the song went on to peak at number six on the Billboard Hot 100, and won Best R&B Performance and Best R&B Song at the 68th Annual Grammy Awards. On October 24, 2025, they released the "Folded Homage Pack" digitally, which included remixes featuring singers Brandy, JoJo, Mario, Ne-Yo, Tank, and Toni Braxton. On November 7, 2025, they released the single "Out the Window", releasing the official music video on November 27, 2025.

On April 10, 2026, Kehlani released the single "Back and Forth", featuring rapper Missy Elliott; the third single from her self-titled fifth album, which was released on April 24, 2026, peaked at number 25 on the US Bubbling Under Hot 100 chart. "Shoulda Never" was released on the same day as the album, as the fourth official single.

== Personal life ==
In January 2016, it was confirmed that Kehlani was in a relationship with star NBA point guard Kyrie Irving. In March 2016, Canadian singer PartyNextDoor posted a picture of Kehlani's hand on Instagram, insinuating that they were in bed together. This caused a media controversy across Twitter, in which abuse was tweeted against Kehlani in hundreds of thousands of posts. Kehlani attempted suicide shortly thereafter. Irving later stated on Twitter that the pair had broken up before the incident. Kehlani took to social media to explain that they did not cheat on Irving in a public statement to acknowledge their attempted suicide in the wake of the media attention. In 2018, Irving penned an apology to Kehlani via an Instagram post, expressing appreciation towards the singer, and they responded wishing him well.

On September 6, 2019, it was confirmed that Kehlani was dating American rapper YG, but after three months of dating, Kehlani and YG broke up. However, the two released a collaborative single for Valentine's Day, "Konclusions", on February 14, 2020. In May 2020, during an interview with The Breakfast Club, Kehlani said that they discovered that YG was cheating on them after seeing his phone. YG apologized by filling their lawn with roses. Kehlani added that they do not speak, but remain cordial.

Kehlani announced that they were pregnant with their first child, a girl, on Instagram on October 12, 2018, with the father being Javaughn Young-White, who plays guitar for Kehlani. They opened up in December 2018 about prenatal depression and how their pregnancy is harder than it might look. In 2019, Kehlani gave birth to a daughter at home.

Between their second and third studio albums, It Was Good Until It Wasn’t and Blue Water Road, they stated they went through a spiritual detox in order to get out of a toxic cycle with themself. After their breakup with YG and near the beginning of the COVID-19 pandemic, they stripped themself down emotionally and began writing Blue Water Road to process this change. In the summer of 2020, Kehlani bought a small farm in Simi Valley, California, where they live with their daughter. They were in a relationship with the 070 collective member, Danielle Balbuena, better known as 070 Shake. In 2020, Kehlani started practicing the African diasporic religion La Regla de Ocha.

In 2024, Kehlani was briefly married to A&R and music executive Mariel Gomerez, before Gomerez filed for a marriage annulment three months later citing fraud and infidelity. In October 2025, Kehlani confirmed that they were in a relationship with British singer and rapper Kwn.

Kehlani is a vegan. They have spoken about their past experiences being a survivor of sexual assault and rape.

Kehlani has been diagnosed with borderline personality disorder (BPD) and bipolar disorder.

=== In politics ===
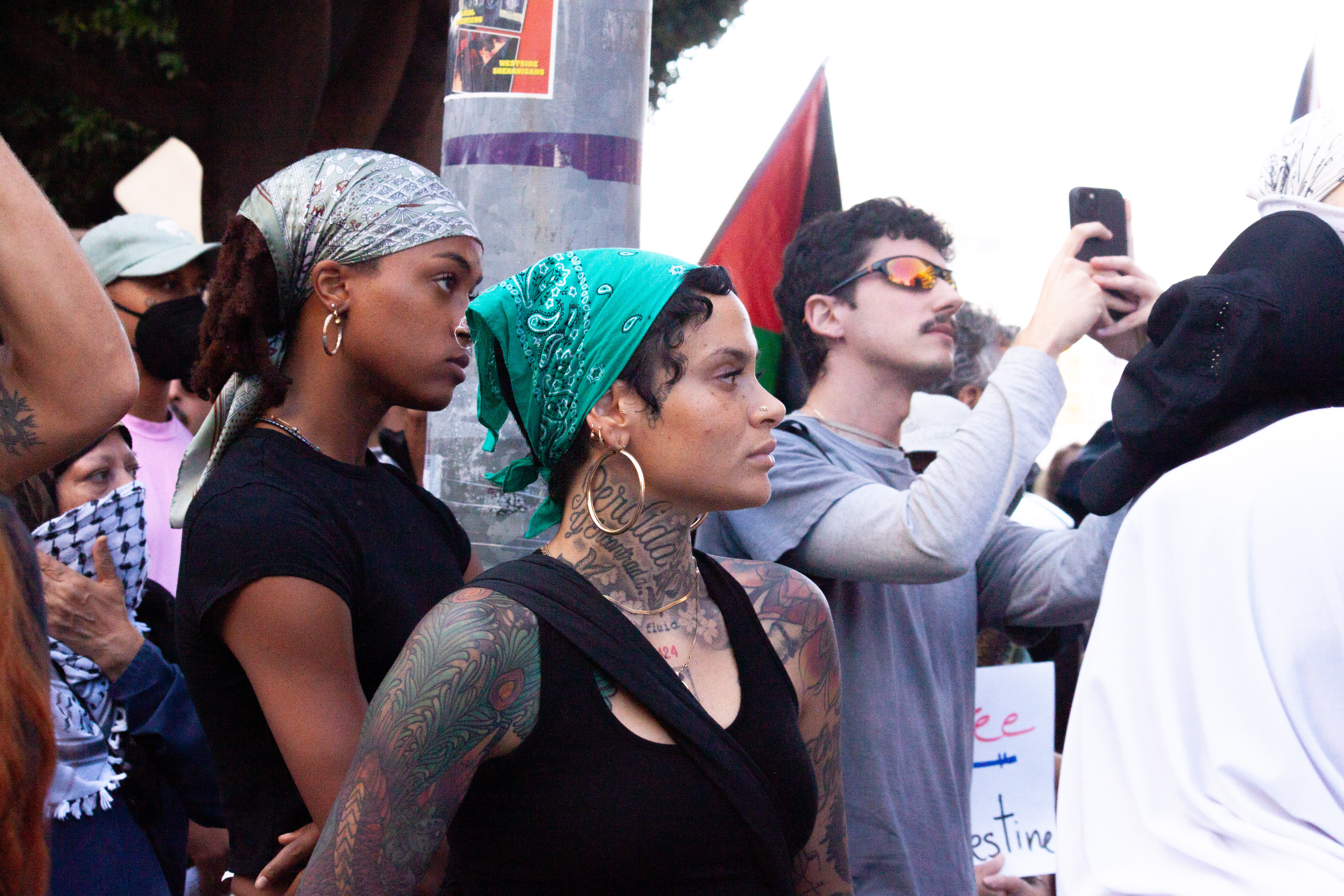
Kehlani at a protest in solidarity with Palestine, October 2023

Kehlani expressed solidarity with Palestine during the Gaza war. In Instagram posts, they voiced disapproval for celebrities who have chosen to remain silent on the matter, implying that those celebrities prioritize their personal business endeavors over addressing a pressing humanitarian crisis. They were a principal signer of the October 2023 open letter, Artists Against Apartheid.

In November 2023, Kehlani signed an open letter calling for a ceasefire and an end to the Israeli blockade of the Gaza Strip. On May 27, 2024, Kehlani voiced their criticism on Instagram, this time directed specifically at fellow musicians for remaining silent about the Gaza–Israel conflict in Palestine. They further demonstrated their support for Gaza in the “Next 2 U” music video, which opens up with a poem by a Palestinian American writer and has a Palestinian flag in the background of the entire video.

In April 2025, Kehlani's scheduled performance at Cornell University's annual Slope Day was canceled by university president Michael Kotlikoff over their support for Palestine. Kotlikoff claimed that Kehlani had "espoused antisemitic, anti-Israel sentiments in performances, videos, and on social media." In response, they responded on Instagram saying, "I am not antisemitic, nor anti-Jew. I am anti-genocide, I am anti the actions of the Israeli government, I am anti an extermination of an entire people, I am anti the bombing of innocent children, men, women—that’s what I’m anti."

In May 2025, another scheduled Kehlani concert in New York was canceled after pressure from New York City mayor Eric Adams citing "security concerns." The free concert had been scheduled to take place on June 26 at SummerStage as part of Pride events taking place in the city, but was canceled after first deputy mayor Randy Mastro sent a letter to event organizers threatening to revoke their license and refer the matter to police to investigate if the event was a "risk to public safety." The event was canceled in the midst of ongoing backlash against Kehlani's pro-Palestine views.

=== Sexuality and gender identity ===
In April 2018, they spoke about their sexuality on Twitter, stating, "I'm queer. Not bi, not straight. I'm attracted to women, men, REALLY attracted to queer men, non-binary people, intersex people, trans people. lil poly pansexual". After that, during a livestream in early 2021, Kehlani announced that they are a lesbian, after having publicly identified as queer and pansexual in the past. They prefer polyamorous relationships. They have stated that it is important for them to include female pronouns in their music.

In an April 2019 interview with Diva, Kehlani stated they are "definitely on the non-binary scale" despite preferring "she" pronouns. In December 2020, Kehlani updated their pronouns on Twitter to "she/they". In an interview with Byrdie Magazine in 2021, they stated their preference for "they" over "she", because "something feels really affirming when people say they", and that "it feels like you really see me".

=== Tattoos ===
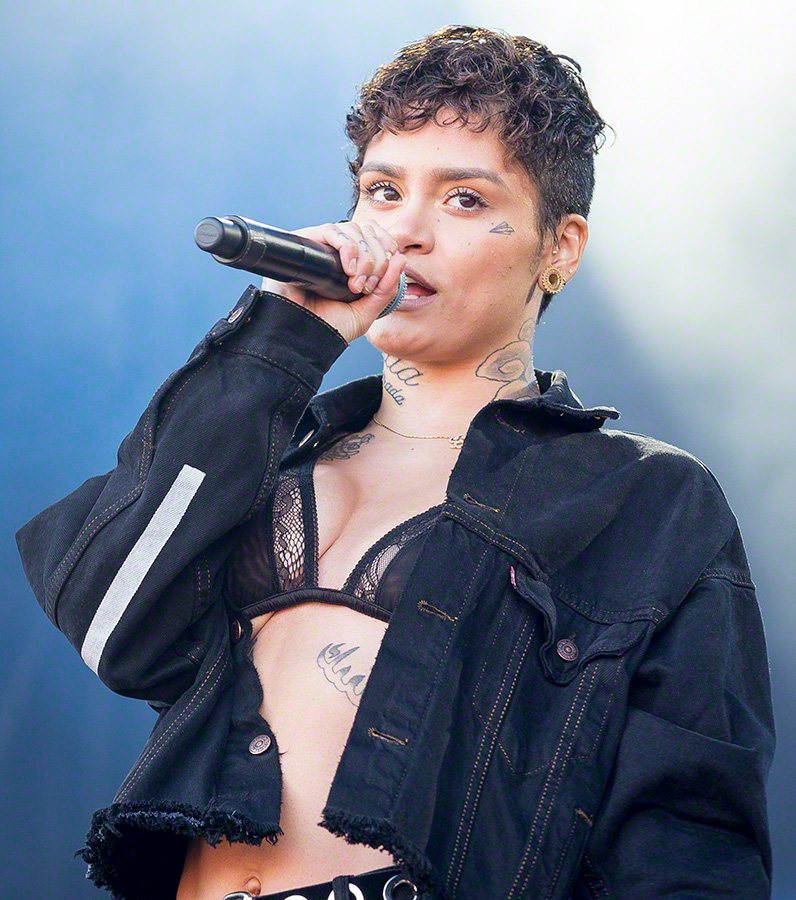
Kehlani in July 2016

Kehlani got their first tattoo when they were 16. Some of their tattoos include Coraline, Regina "Reggie" Rocket, Mia Wallace and Vincent Vega dancing, Lauryn Hill, Frida Kahlo, a sleeve of roses, a sunflower, and face tattoos of a paper plane and four dots.

In an interview with Power 106, Kehlani discusses their attempted suicide was due to the negative media response as well as their first major heartbreak. They state that their album was therapeutic through their difficult time. During their recovery, they got a tattoo that says "perdida y encontrada" which in English translates to "lost and found".

On their travels to Australia during August 2017, Kehlani received a "Kirituhi", a Māori tattoo from a New Zealand artist, whom they flew from New Zealand to Sydney, Australia to complete. On Kehlani's Instagram post, they captioned the photo: "[T]he piece representing my whānau/family, 6 koru representing my 4 siblings here on earth and the 2 that have transferred into the next life. 2 mangopare/hammerhead sharks representing guidance and strength through adversity and tribulation."

On January 5, 2018, Kehlani posted a photo to Instagram showing that their hand tattoo of the word "woke" had been covered up with a lotus flower; they stated that they felt that their "hand would speak for [them] before [they] even got a chance to open [their] mouth".

=== Business ventures ===
==== Entrepreneurship in activism ====
In tandem with the release of their single "Next 2 U" in 2024, they unveiled merchandise created by Palestinian Nöl Collective creative director and founder Yasmeen Mjalli. The entirety of the proceeds from the sales of the merchandise went towards aiding Palestinian, Congolese and Sudanese families in collaboration with Operation Olive Branch.

== Discography ==
Studio albums

- SweetSexySavage (2017)
- It Was Good Until It Wasn't (2020)
- Blue Water Road (2022)
- Crash (2024)
- Kehlani (2026)

== Filmography ==
Film and television roles
Year	Title	Role	Notes	Ref.
2022	The L Word: Generation Q	Ivy	Guest star	
2023	Creed III	Themself	Cameo	

== Tours ==
Headlining

- SweetSexySavage World Tour (2017)
- Blue Water Road Trip (2022)
- Crash World Tour (2024–2025)
- Kehlani World Tour (2026–2027)

Supporting

- Demi Lovato – Tell Me You Love Me World Tour (2018)
- Halsey – Hopeless Fountain Kingdom World Tour (2018)

== Awards and nominations ==
Award	Year	Nominee(s)	Category	Result	Ref.
American Music Awards	2017	Themself	Favorite Female Artist – Soul/R&B	Nominated	
American Music Awards	2025	Themself	Favorite Female Artist – Soul/R&B	Nominated	
American Music Awards	2026	Themself	Best Female R&B Artist	Nominated	
American Music Awards	2026	"Folded"	Song of the Year	Nominated	
American Music Awards	2026	"Folded"	Best R&B Song	Nominated	
BET Awards	2016	Themself	Best New Artist	Nominated	
BET Awards	2017	"Distraction"	Centric Award	Nominated	
BET Awards	2017	Themself	Best Female R&B/Pop Artist	Nominated	
BET Awards	2018	Themself	Best Female R&B/Pop Artist	Nominated	
BET Awards	2020	Themself	Best Female R&B/Pop Artist	Nominated	
BET Awards	2025	Themself	Best Female R&B/Pop Artist	Nominated	
BET Awards	2025	"After Hours"	Video of the Year	Nominated	
BET Awards	2026	Themself	Best Female R&B/Pop Artist	Won	
BET Awards	2026	"Folded"	Video of the Year	Won	
BET Awards	2026	"Folded"	Viewer's Choice Award	Nominated	
Billboard Music Awards	2021	It Was Good Until It Wasn't	Top R&B Album	Nominated	
Billboard Women in Music	2017	Themself	Rulebreaker Award	Won	
British LGBT Awards	2018	Themself	MTV Music Artist	Nominated	
British LGBT Awards	2022	Themself	MTV Music Artist	Nominated	
Give Her FlowHERS Awards	2022	Themself	The Alchemist Award	Honored	
GLAAD Media Awards	2018	SweetSexySavage	Outstanding Music Artist	Nominated	
GLAAD Media Awards	2021	It Was Good Until It Wasn't	Outstanding Music Artist	Nominated	
Grammy Awards	2016	You Should Be Here	Best Urban Contemporary Album	Nominated	
Grammy Awards	2018	"Distraction"	Best R&B Performance	Nominated	
Grammy Awards	2025	"After Hours"	Best R&B Song	Nominated	
Grammy Awards	2025	Crash	Best Progressive R&B Album	Nominated	
Grammy Awards	2025	"Kehlani"	Best Melodic Rap Performance	Nominated	
Grammy Awards	2026	"Folded"	Best R&B Performance	Won	
Grammy Awards	2026	"Folded"	Best R&B Song	Won	
Grammy Awards	2027	"Out the Window"	Best R&B Solo Performance	Pending	
Grammy Awards	2027	"Out the Window"	Best R&B Song	Pending	
Grammy Awards	2027	"Sweet Nuthins"	Best R&B Collaboration or Duo/Group Performance	Pending	
Grammy Awards	2027	Kehlani	Best R&B Album	Pending	
Grammy Awards	2027	"Safe" (with Cardi B)	Best Melodic Rap Performance	Pending	
iHeartRadio Music Awards	2018	Themself	Best New R&B Artist	Nominated	
iHeartRadio Music Awards	2026	Themself	R&B Artist of the Year	Nominated	
iHeartRadio Music Awards	2026	"Folded"	R&B Song of the Year	Won	
MOBO Awards	2026	Themself	Best International Act	Nominated	
NAACP Image Awards	2026	"Folded"	Outstanding Soul/R&B Song	Nominated	
NAACP Image Awards	2026	"Folded"	Outstanding Music Video/Visual Album	Nominated	
NAACP Image Awards	2026	"Safe" (with Cardi B)	Outstanding Duo, Group or Collaboration (Contemporary)	Nominated	
NAACP Image Awards	2026	"Worst Behavior" (with Kwn)	Outstanding Duo, Group or Collaboration (Contemporary)	Nominated	
Queerty Awards	2022	Themself	Closet Door Bustdown	Nominated	
Soul Train Music Awards	2017	Themself	Best R&B/Soul Female Artist	Nominated	
Soul Train Music Awards	2026	"Folded"	R&B/Soul Song Of The Year	Pending	
