= Out the Window =

Single by Kehlani

from the album Kehlani
- Released: November 7, 2025
- Length: 4:17
- Label: Atlantic
- Songwriters: Kehlani; Antonio Lamar Dixon; Ashton Norful; Khris Riddick-Tynes; Talay Riley
- Producers: Antonio Lamar Dixon; Khris Riddick-Tynes

Kehlani singles chronology
"Safe" (2025)	"Out the Window" (2025)	"Back and Forth" (2026)

Music video
- "Out the Window" on YouTube

"Out the Window" is a song by American singer Kehlani. It was released on November 7, 2025, through Atlantic Records as the second single from their self-titled fifth studio album. Kehlani co-wrote the song with Antonio Lamar Dixon, Ashton Norful, Khris Riddick-Tynes and Talay Riley. The song was produced by Dixon and Tynes.

== Background ==
"Out the Window" was released five months after Kehlani's "Folded", which became their first top-ten entry on the Billboard Hot 100 and their first number 1 on both Hot R&B/Hip-Hop Songs and Hot R&B Songs charts. In a Billboard Family interview, Kehlani stated that they are working on a new album planned for release the following year.

== Composition ==
Lyrically, the song explores the aftermath of a dissolved relationship and the possibility of reconciliation. Unlike the previous single, where Kehlani resisted temptation while moving on, in this track they are actively considering reuniting.

== Promotion ==
Prior to its release, "Out the Window" circulated online through snippets shared on social media. Kehlani also previewed the song during early live performances, where audiences were already singing along despite the track not yet being officially released.

== Music video ==
On November 27, 2025, Kehlani released an official music video for "Out the Window", directed by Gabe Phoenix and Travis Colbert. In the video, Kehlani referenced numerous R&B and pop singer's music videos from the 1990s and 2000s, including Aaliyah's music video to 2000 hit single "Try Again".

== Charts ==
Chart performance for "Out the Window"
Chart (2025–2026)	Peak position
Canada Hot 100 (Billboard)	91
New Zealand Hot Singles (RMNZ)	1
US Billboard Hot 100	63
US Hot R&B/Hip-Hop Songs (Billboard)	10
US R&B/Hip-Hop Airplay (Billboard)	25
US Rhythmic Airplay (Billboard)	2
