= Grammy Award for Best R&B Solo Performance =

Music Awards

- "Folded" by Kehlani is the most recent recipient
- Awarded for: quality vocal or instrumental R&B recordings
- Country: United States
- Presented by: National Academy of Recording Arts and Sciences
- Currently held by: Kehlani – "Folded" (2026)
- Website: grammy.com

The Grammy Award for Best R&B Solo Performance is an award presented at the Grammy Awards, a ceremony that was established in 1958 and originally called the Gramophone Awards. According to the 54th Grammy Awards description guide it is designed for solo, duo/groups or collaborative (vocal or instrumental) R&B recordings and is limited to singles or tracks only.

The award was originally awarded from 1959 to 1961 as Best Rhythm & Blues Performance and then from 1962 to 1968 as Best Rhythm & Blues Recording before being discontinued. In 2012, the award was brought back combining the previous categories for Best Female R&B Vocal Performance, Best Male R&B Vocal Performance, Best R&B Performance by a Duo or Group with Vocal and Best Urban/Alternative Performance. The restructuring of these categories was a result of the Recording Academy's wish to decrease the list of categories and awards and to eliminate the distinctions between male and female performances, and between solo and duo/groups performances. In 2027, a new Best R&B Collaboration or Duo/Group Performance category was established, and the award was renamed Best R&B Solo Performance.

The award goes to the artist. The producer, engineer and songwriter can apply for a Winners Certificate.

== Recipients ==
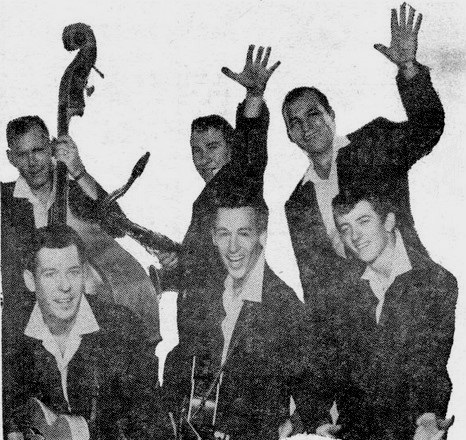
The Champs were the inaugural winners of the award.

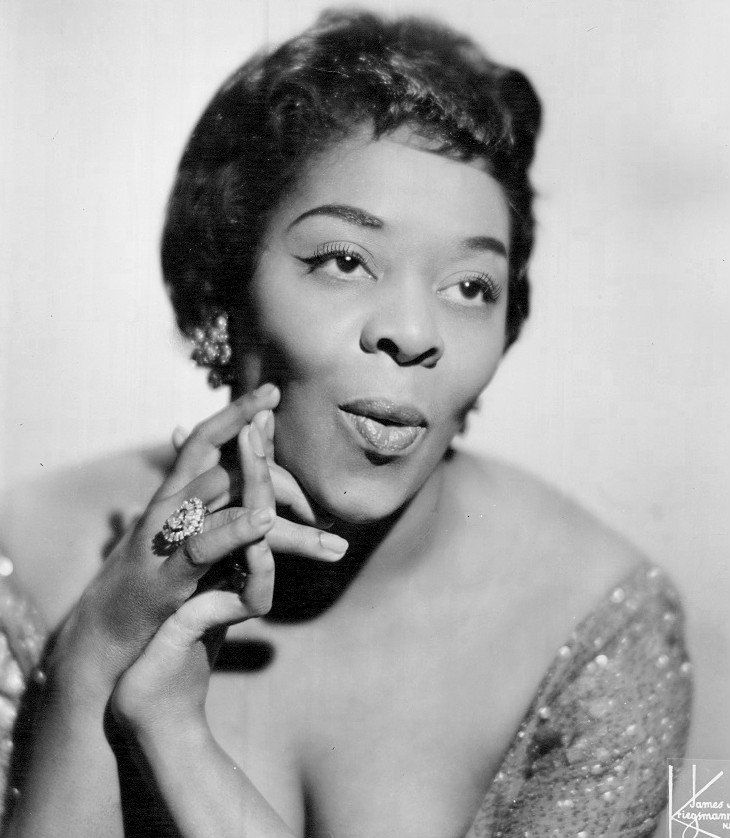
Dinah Washington was the first female recipient of the award.

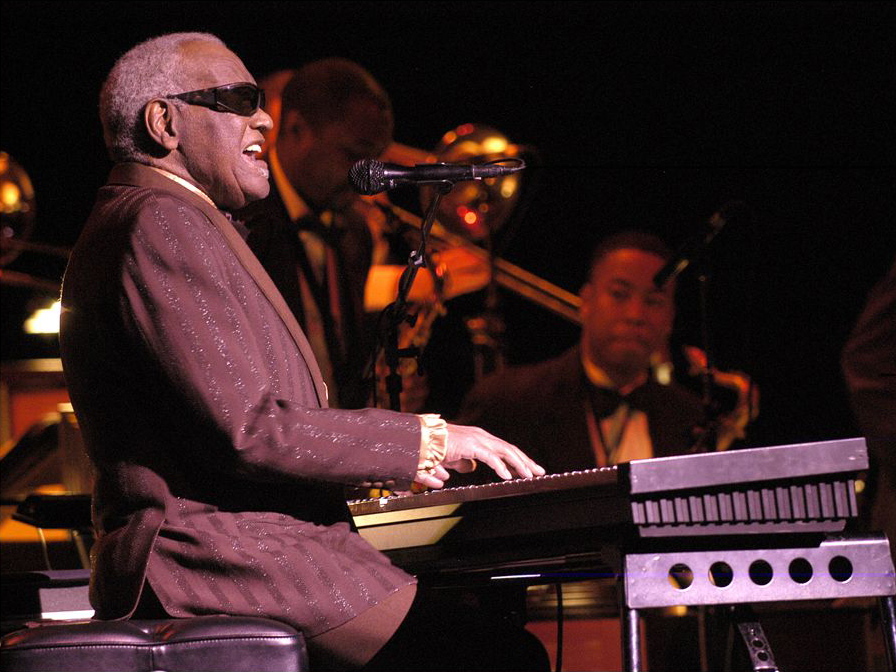
Ray Charles has the most wins in this category, winning the award five times.

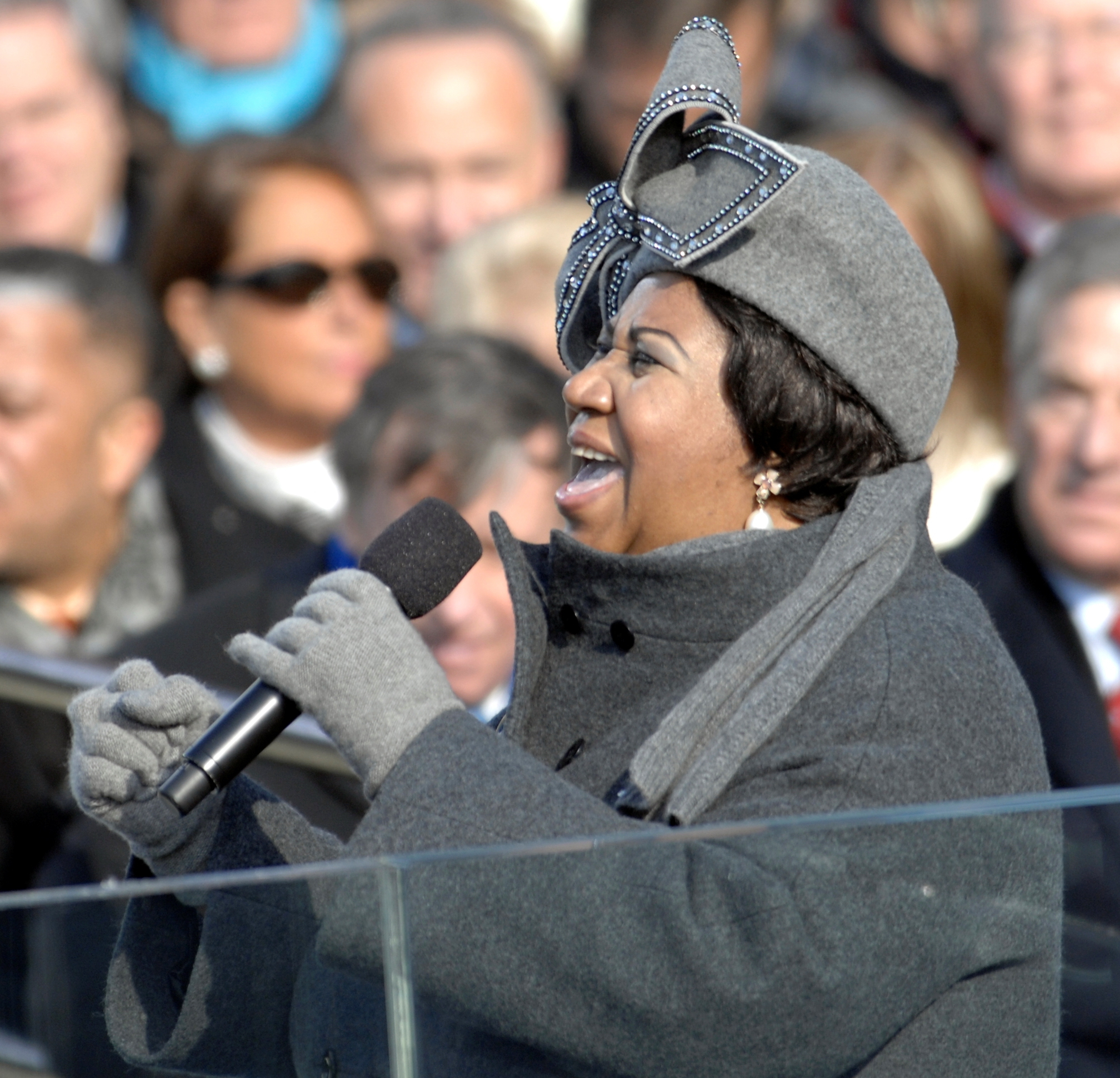
The award was discontinued in 1968, Aretha Franklin being the last winner.

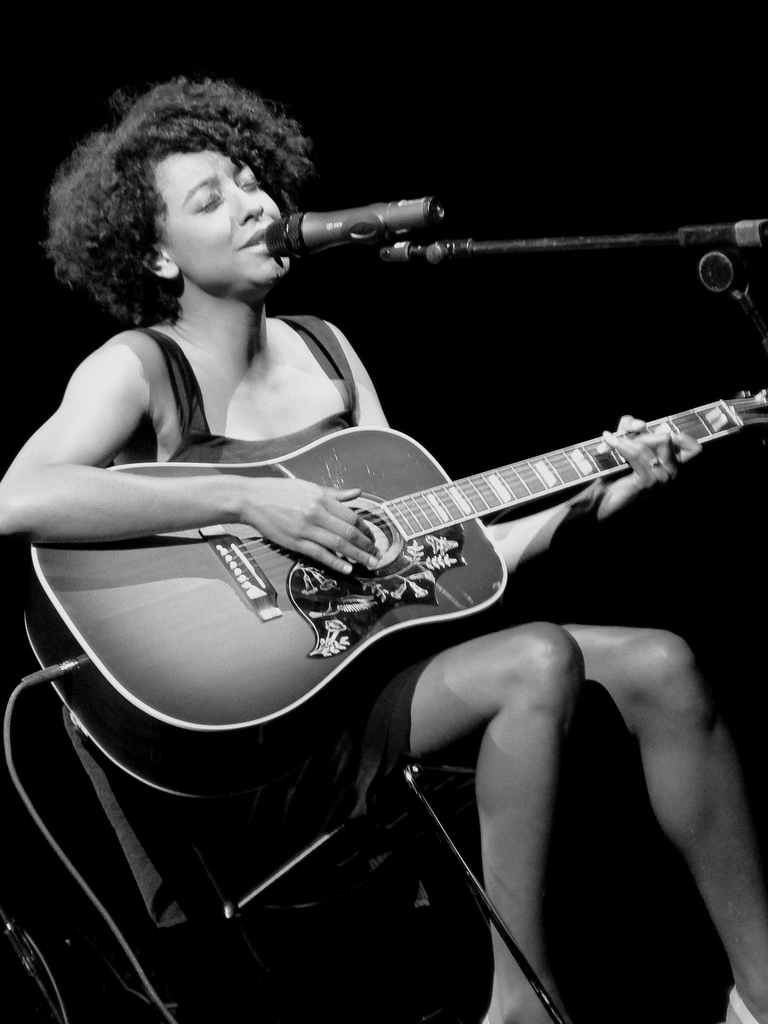
Corinne Bailey Rae was the recipient of the reintroduced award in 2012.

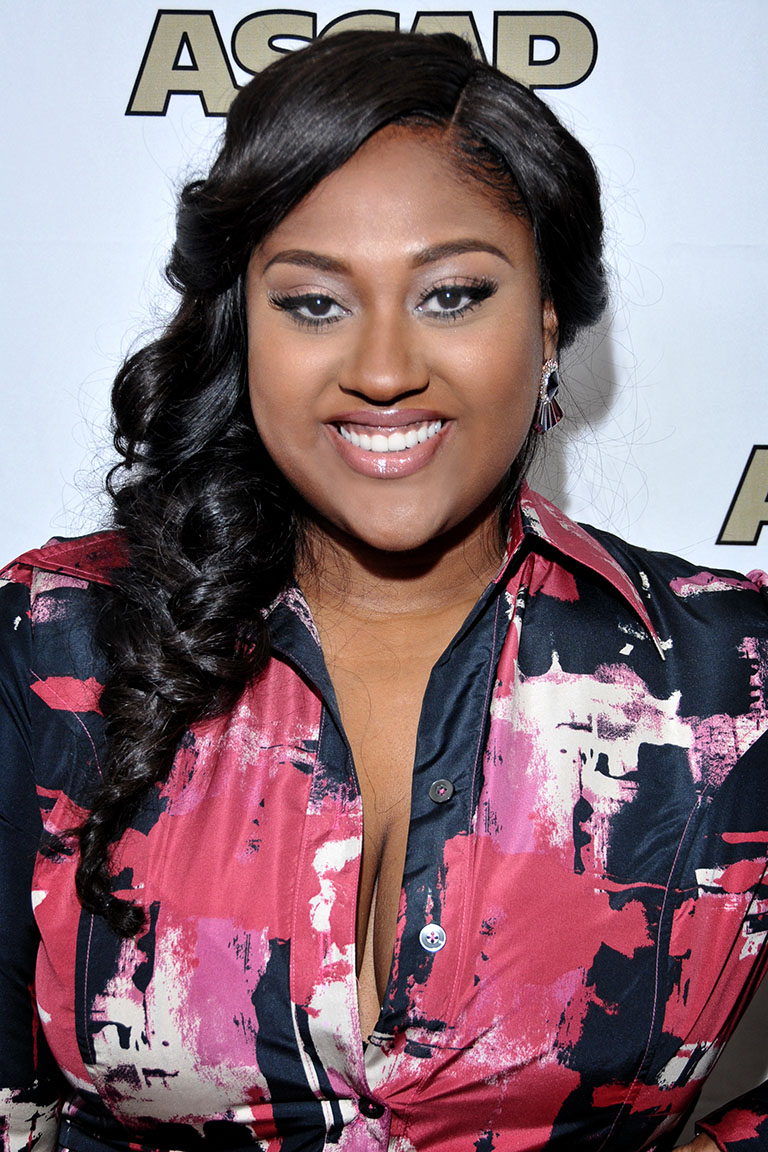
2022 co-winner Jazmine Sullivan.

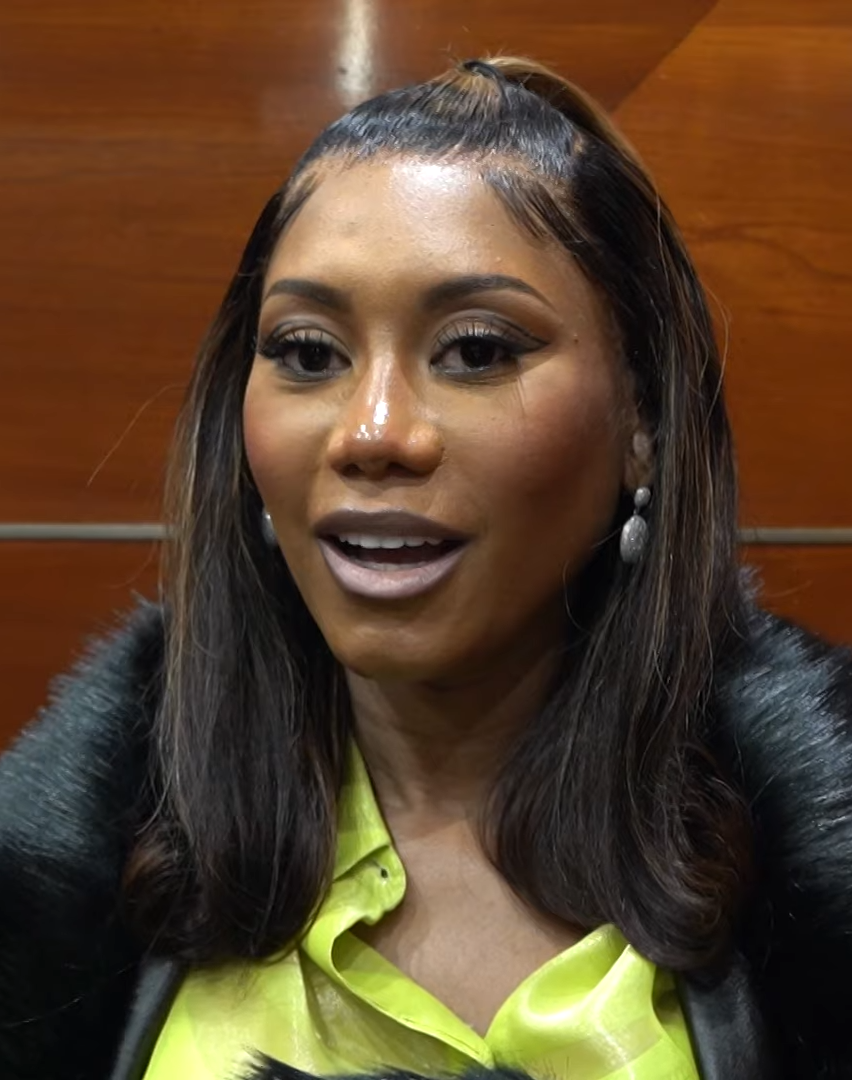
Two-time winner, Muni Long. (2023 & 2025)

=== 1950s ===
Year^{[I]}	Performing artist(s)	Work
1959
1959	The Champs	"Tequila"
1959	Harry Belafonte	Belafonte Sings the Blues
1959	Nat King Cole	"Looking Back"
1959	Earl Grant	"The End"
1959	Perez Prado	"Patricia"

=== 1960s ===
Year^{[I]}	Performing artist(s)	Work
1960
1960	Dinah Washington	"What a Diff'rence a Day Makes"
1960	Jesse Belvin	"Guess Who"
1960	The Coasters	"Charlie Brown"
1960	Nat King Cole	"Midnight Flyer"
1960	Elvis Presley	"A Big Hunk o' Love"
1961
1961	Ray Charles	"Let the Good Times Roll"
1961	LaVerne Baker	"Shake a Hand"
1961	Hank Ballard and The Midnighters	"Finger Poppin' Time"
1961	Bo Diddley	"Walkin' and Talkin'"
1961	John Lee Hooker	Travelin'
1961	Etta James	"All I Could Do Was Cry"
1961	Muddy Waters	"Got My Mojo Working"
1961	Jackie Wilson	"Lonely Teardrops"
1962
1962	Ray Charles	"Hit the Road Jack"
1962	LaVerne Baker	"Saved"
1962	Etta James	"The Fool That I Am"
1962	Ernie K-Doe	"Mother-in-Law"
1962	Jimmy Reed	"Bright Lights, Big City"
1963
1963	Ray Charles	"I Can't Stop Loving You"
1963	B. Bumble and the Stingers	"Nut Rocker"
1963	Sam Cooke	"Bring It On Home to Me"
1963	Bobby Darin	"What'd I Say"
1963	Little Eva	"The Loco-Motion"
1963	Mel Tormé	"Comin' Home Baby"
1964
1964	Ray Charles	"Busted"
1964	Sam Cooke	"Frankie and Johnny"
1964	Barbara Lewis	"Hello Stranger"
1964	Little Johnny Taylor	"Part Time Love"
1964	Major Lance	"Hey Little Girl"
1964	Martha and the Vandellas	"(Love Is Like a) Heat Wave"
1964	Lenny Welch	"Since I Fell for You"
1965
1965	Nancy Wilson	"How Glad I Am"
1965	Sam Cooke	"Good Times"
1965	The Impressions	"Keep on Pushing"
1965	The Supremes	"Baby Love"
1965	Joe Tex	"Hold What You've Got"
1965	Dionne Warwick	"Walk On By"
1966
1966	James Brown	"Papa's Got a Brand New Bag"
1966	Sam Cooke	"Shake"
1966	Wilson Pickett	"In the Midnight Hour"
1966	The Temptations	"My Girl"
1966	Junior Walker and the All-Stars	"Shotgun"
1967
1967	Ray Charles	"Crying Time"
1967	James Brown	"It's a Man's Man's Man's World"
1967	Lou Rawls	"Love Is a Hurtin' Thing"
1967	Percy Sledge	"When a Man Loves a Woman"
1967	Stevie Wonder	"Uptight (Everything's Alright)"
1968
1968	Aretha Franklin	"Respect"
1968	Lou Rawls	"Dead End Street"
1968	Otis Redding	"Try a Little Tenderness"
1968	Sam & Dave	"Soul Man"
1968	Joe Tex	"Skinny Legs and All"

=== 2010s ===
Year^{[I]}	Performing artist(s)	Work
2012
2012	Corinne Bailey Rae	"Is This Love"
2012	Marsha Ambrosius	"Far Away"
2012	Ledisi	"Pieces of Me"
2012	Kelly Price and Stokley	"Not My Daddy"
2012	Charlie Wilson	"You Are"
2013
2013	Usher	"Climax"
2013	Estelle	"Thank You"
2013	Robert Glasper Experiment and Ledisi	"Gonna Be Alright (F.T.B.)"
2013	Luke James	"I Want You"
2013	Miguel	"Adorn"
2014
2014	Snarky Puppy featuring Lalah Hathaway	"Something"
2014	Tamar Braxton	"Love and War"
2014	Anthony Hamilton	"Best of Me"
2014	Hiatus Kaiyote featuring Q-Tip	"Nakamarra"
2014	Miguel featuring Kendrick Lamar	"How Many Drinks?"
2015
2015	Beyoncé featuring Jay Z	"Drunk in Love"
2015	Chris Brown featuring Usher and Rick Ross	"New Flame"
2015	Jennifer Hudson featuring R. Kelly	"It's Your World"
2015	Ledisi	"Like This"
2015	Usher	"Good Kisser"
2016
2016	The Weeknd	"Earned It (Fifty Shades of Grey)"
2016	Tamar Braxton	"If I Don't Have You"
2016	Andra Day	"Rise Up"
2016	Hiatus Kaiyote	"Breathing Underwater"
2016	Jeremih featuring J. Cole	"Planez"
2017
2017	Solange	"Cranes in the Sky"
2017	BJ the Chicago Kid	"Turnin' Me Up"
2017	Ro James	"Permission"
2017	Musiq Soulchild	"I Do"
2017	Rihanna	"Needed Me"
2018
2018	Bruno Mars	"That's What I Like"
2018	Daniel Caesar featuring Kali Uchis	"Get You"
2018	Kehlani	"Distraction"
2018	Ledisi	"High"
2018	SZA	"The Weekend"
2019
2019	Daniel Caesar featuring H.E.R.	"Best Part"
2019	Toni Braxton	"Long as I Live"
2019	The Carters	"Summer"
2019	Lalah Hathaway	"Y O Y"
2019	PJ Morton	"First Began"

=== 2020s ===
Year^{[I]}	Performing artist(s)	Work
2020
2020	Anderson .Paak featuring André 3000	"Come Home"
2020	Brandy and Daniel Caesar	"Love Again"
2020	H.E.R. featuring Bryson Tiller	"Could've Been"
2020	Lizzo featuring Gucci Mane	"Exactly How I Feel"
2020	Lucky Daye	"Roll Some Mo"
2021
2021	Beyoncé	"Black Parade"
2021	Jhené Aiko featuring John Legend	"Lightning & Thunder"
2021	Jacob Collier featuring Mahalia and Ty Dolla $ign	"All I Need"
2021	Brittany Howard	"Goat Head"
2021	Emily King	"See Me"
2022
2022	Silk Sonic (TIE)	"Leave the Door Open"
2022	Jazmine Sullivan (TIE)	"Pick Up Your Feelings"
2022	Justin Bieber featuring Daniel Caesar and Giveon	"Peaches"
2022	Snoh Aalegra	"Lost You"
2022	H.E.R.	"Damage"
2023
2023	Muni Long	"Hrs & Hrs"
2023	Beyoncé	"Virgo's Groove"
2023	Mary J. Blige featuring Anderson .Paak	"Here With Me"
2023	Lucky Daye	"Over"
2023	Jazmine Sullivan	"Hurt Me So Good"
2024
2024	Coco Jones	"ICU"
2024	Chris Brown	"Summer Too Hot"
2024	Robert Glasper featuring Sir and Alex Isley	"Back to Love"
2024	Victoria Monét	"How Does It Make You Feel"
2024	SZA	"Kill Bill"
2025
2025	Muni Long	"Made for Me" (Live on BET)
2025	Jhené Aiko	"Guidance"
2025	Chris Brown	"Residuals"
2025	Coco Jones	"Here We Go (Uh Oh)"
2025	SZA	"Saturn"
2026
2026	Kehlani	"Folded"
2026	Justin Bieber	"Yukon"
2026	Chris Brown featuring Bryson Tiller	"It Depends"
2026	Leon Thomas	"Mutt" (Live from NPR's Tiny Desk)
2026	Summer Walker	"Heart of a Woman"
2027	Beyoncé	"Morning Dew (Donk)"
2027	Kehlani	"Out the Window"
2027	Victoria Monét	"Let Me"
2027	Jill Scott	"Pressha"
2027	Tems	"What You Need"

^{^[I]} Each year is linked to the article about the Grammy Awards held that year.

== Artists with multiple wins ==
5 wins

- Ray Charles

2 wins

- Beyoncé
- Bruno Mars
- Anderson .Paak
- Muni Long

== Artists with multiple nominations ==
5 nominations

- Ray Charles

4 nominations

- Beyoncé
- Chris Brown
- Daniel Caesar
- Sam Cooke
- Ledisi

3 nominations

- Kehlani
- H.E.R.
- Anderson .Paak
- SZA
- Usher

2 nominations

- Jhené Aiko
- LaVern Baker
- Justin Bieber
- Tamar Braxton
- James Brown
- Nat King Cole
- Lalah Hathaway
- Hiatus Kaiyote
- Etta James
- Coco Jones
- Jay-Z
- Muni Long
- Lucky Daye
- Bruno Mars
- Miguel
- Victoria Monét
- Lou Rawls
- Jazmine Sullivan
- Joe Tex
- Bryson Tiller

== See also ==
- Grammy Award for Best R&B Collaboration or Duo/Group Performance
- Grammy Award for Best Traditional R&B Performance
- Grammy Award for Best R&B Song
