= After Hours (Kehlani song) =

2024 single by Kehlani

Single by Kehlani

from the album Crash
- Released: April 4, 2024
- Genre: R&B
- Length: 3:23
- Label: Atlantic
- Lyricists: Kehlani Parrish; Khristopher Riddick-Tynes; Alex Goldblatt; Daniel Upchurch; Diovanna Frazier; Cordel Burrell
- Producers: Khris Riddick-Tynes; Alex Goldblatt

Kehlani singles chronology
"Everything" (2022)	"After Hours" (2024)	"Next 2 U" (2024)

Music video
- "After Hours" on YouTube

"After Hours" is a song by American singer-songwriter Kehlani. It was released through Atlantic Records as the lead single from her fourth studio album, Crash, on April 4, 2024. The song was produced by Alex Goldblatt and Khris Riddick-Tynes. On May 24, 2024, a remix of the song using the instrumental of Destiny's Child's 2005 song "Cater 2 U" was released. An official remix of the song, featuring Brazilian singer Ludmilla, was released on August 28, 2024, through Kehlani's While We Wait 2 mixtape. The song received a Grammy nomination for "Best R&B Song" at the 67th Grammy Awards.

== Background ==
Kehlani first previewed "After Hours" on March 5, 2024, through her TikTok and began promoting the track throughout March. On March 25, Kehlani posted an official snippet of the track and made the preview sound available on TikTok and YouTube. They officially announced the single and its release date on April 1.

== Composition ==
"After Hours" contains a sample of Cordell "Skatta" Burrell's dancehall riddim "Coolie Dance Riddim", which was popularised in Nina Sky's April 2004 top-ten single, "Move Ya Body" featuring Jabba, and has been crowned a "summer anthem" by music critics. The track "sees Kehlani lean into the levity of radio-friendly RnB" and is described as a "frivolous club-inclined track".

== Critical reception ==
Eric Torres of Pitchfork described "After Hours" as "a featherlight, upbeat reinterpretation that doubles as an expert showcase for Kehlani’s vocals". In the context of the album, Michael Cragg of The Observer said the song "sets the tone, its nostalgic, club-based R&B a perfect summer soundtrack".

Critics' year-end rankings of "After Hours"
Publication	List	Rank	Ref.
NPR	124 Best Songs of 2024	—N/a	

== Personnel ==
Musicians

- Kehlani Parrish – lead artist, vocals, songwriter, composer
- Khristopher Riddick-Tynes – songwriter, composer, producer
- Alex Goldblatt – songwriter, composer, producer
- Daniel Upchurch – songwriter, composer
- Diovanna Frazier – songwriter, composer
- Cordel Burrell – songwriter, composer

Technical

- Colin Leonard – mastering
- Jaycen Joshua – mixing
- Mike Seaberg – mixing
- Jacob Richards – assistant mixing
- Chris Bhikoo – assistant mixing

== Charts ==
=== Weekly charts ===
Weekly chart performance for "After Hours"
Chart (2024–2025)	Peak position
New Zealand Hot Singles (RMNZ)	7
Nigeria (TurnTable Top 100)	61
Philippines Hot 100 (Billboard Philippines)	61
US Billboard Hot 100	72
US Hot R&B/Hip-Hop Songs (Billboard)	21
US Rhythmic Airplay (Billboard)	4

=== Year-end charts ===
2024 year-end chart performance for "After Hours"
Chart (2024)	Position
US Hot R&B/Hip-Hop Songs (Billboard)	59
US Rhythmic (Billboard)	19

== Certifications ==
Certifications for "After Hours"
Region	Certification	Certified units/sales
Canada (Music Canada)	Platinum	80,000^{‡}
New Zealand (RMNZ)	Platinum	30,000^{‡}
United Kingdom (BPI)	Silver	200,000^{‡}
United States (RIAA)	Gold	500,000^{‡}
^{‡} Sales+streaming figures based on certification alone.
