= Crash (Kehlani album) =

Studio album by Kehlani
- Released: June 21, 2024
- Genre: R&B
- Length: 42:59
- Label: Atlantic
- Producer: Camper; Ant Clemons; Aidan; Dixson; Etienne; Alex Goldblatt; GuiltyBeatz; Mamii; Oak; Khris Riddick-Tynes; Jack Rochon

Kehlani chronology
Blue Water Road (2022)	Crash (2024)	While We Wait 2 (2024)

Singles from Crash
- 1. "After Hours" Released: April 4, 2024; 2. "Next 2 U" Released: May 31, 2024; 3. "Crash" Released: June 21, 2024

Crash is the fourth studio album by American singer-songwriter Kehlani. Released by Atlantic Records on June 21, 2024, the album features guest appearances from Jill Scott, Young Miko, and Omah Lay. Production was handled by Dixson, Mamii, Khris Riddick-Tynes, Alex Goldblatt, Oak Felder, Jack Rochon, Aidan, Aaron Paris, Ant Clemons, Darhyl Camper, GuiltyBeatz, and Etienne. Serving as the follow-up to Kehlani's previous album, Blue Water Road (2022), Crash was supported by three singles: "After Hours", "Next 2 U" and "Crash". The album was nominated for Best Progressive R&B Album at the 67th Grammy Awards.

== Recording ==
Kehlani and Atlantic secured the sample for the song titled "What I Want" at the last minute. It reuses a portion from Christina Aguilera's 1999 single "What a Girl Wants". Kehlani noted: "She's [Aguilera] the shit. She's super kind and she was, like, 'I'm down,' instantly."

== Singles and promotion ==
The lead single of the album, "After Hours", was released on April 4, 2024. On May 15, 2024, Kehlani announced the album, along with its cover art and release date. The second single, "Next 2 U", was released on May 31, 2024. On June 14, 2024, Kehlani revealed the tracklist of the album.

== Critical reception ==
Professional ratings
Aggregate scores
Source	Rating
AnyDecentMusic?	6.8/10
Metacritic	73/100
Review scores
Source	Rating
Clash	8/10
Exclaim!	7/10
Pitchfork	6.8/10
Rolling Stone	3/5 stars
The Independent	4/5 stars
The Observer	4/5 stars

Crash was met with positive reviews from music critics. On Metacritic, which assigns a normalized score out of 100 to ratings from professional publications, the album received a weighted mean score of 73, based on seven reviews, indicating "generally favorable reviews". The review aggregator site AnyDecentMusic? compiled eight reviews and gave the album an average of 6.8 out of 10.

== Track listing ==
Crash track listing
No.	Title	Writer(s)	Producer(s)	Length
1.	"GrooveTheory"	Kehlani Parrish; Darius Scott; Shawntoni Nichols; Darhyl Camper; Daniel Upchurch	Dixson; Mamii	4:07
2.	"Next 2 U"	Parrish; Anthony Clemons, Jr.; D. Scott	Dixson	2:41
3.	"After Hours"	Parrish; Khristopher Riddick-Tynes; Alex Goldblatt; Cordel Burrell; Diovanna Frazier; Upchurch	Riddick-Tynes; Goldblatt	3:22
4.	"What I Want"	Parrish; Warren Felder; Michael Orabiyi; Shelly Peiken; Morgan Belanger; Guy Roche; Klara Munk-Hansen	Oak	3:47
5.	"Crash"	Parrish; Riddick-Tynes; Goldblatt; Jack Rochon; Aidan Carroll; Aaron Cheung; Reginald Becton; Upchurch	Riddick-Tynes; Goldblatt; Rochon; Aidan; Aaron Paris^{[a]}	2:36
6.	"8"	Parrish; Kwamé Holland; Clemons; D. Scott	Clemons; Dixson	2:30
7.	"Sucia" (featuring Jill Scott and Young Miko)	Parrish; Jill Scott; María de Arellano Cardona; Camper; D. Scott; Nichols; Frazier; Belanger	Camper	4:22
8.	"Better Not"	Parrish; Felder; Upchurch; Belanger; Becton; Destin Conrad; Alexander Ben-Abdallah	Oak	2:44
9.	"Tears" (featuring Omah Lay)	Parrish; Stanley Didia; Atia Boggs; Rochon; Ronald Banful; Edgar Etienne; Becton; Samik Ganguly	Rochon; GuiltyBeatz; Etienne	3:33
10.	"Vegas"	Parrish; Camper; Clemons; Rochon; Boggs; Upchurch; D. Scott; Belanger; Becton	Camper; Clemons; Rochon	3:46
11.	"Deep"	Parrish; Rochon; D. Scott; Belanger	Rochon; Dixson^{[a]}	2:48
12.	"Chapel"	Parrish; D. Scott; Rochon; Upchurch; Belanger; Becton; Alexander Graham; Prince-Phabian Iman	Dixson; Rochon	3:57
13.	"Lose My Wife"	Parrish; Rochon; D. Scott	Rochon; Dixson^{[a]}	2:46
Total length:				42:59

Notes

- ^{^[a]} signifies an additional producer
- "What I Want" contains a sample from "What a Girl Wants" performed by Christina Aguilera. This song does not appear on physical versions of the album.

== Personnel ==
- Kehlani – vocals
- Colin Leonard – mastering
- Jaycen Joshua – mixing
- Mike Seaberg – mix engineering
- Chris Bhikoo – mixing assistance
- Jacob Richards – mixing assistance
- Jonathan Lopez Garcia – engineering assistance (tracks 3, 9, 10, 11)
- Patrick Gardner – engineering assistance (tracks 5, 7, 9–12)
- Danforth Webster – engineering assistance (track 9)
- Terena Dawn – engineering assistance (tracks 9–11)
- Hayden Duncan – engineering assistance (tracks 10, 11)
- Aaron Paris – violin (track 5)
- Dixson – drums (tracks 11, 13)
- Mamii – background vocals (track 12)

== Charts ==
Chart performance for Crash
Chart (2024)	Peak position
Australian Hip Hop/R&B Albums (ARIA)	38
Hungarian Physical Albums (MAHASZ)	8
UK Albums Sales (OCC)	25
UK R&B Albums (OCC)	1
US Billboard 200	25
