= Folded (song) =

2025 single by Kehlani

Single by Kehlani

from the album Kehlani
- Released: June 13, 2025
- Genre: R&B
- Length: 3:58 (Original); 3:34 (Radio Edit)
- Label: Atlantic
- Songwriters: Kehlani Parrish; Andre Harris; Donovan Knight; Miloš Angelov; Khristopher Riddick-Tynes; Darius Scott; Dawit Wilson
- Producers: Andre Harris; D.K. The Punisher; Don Mills; Riddick-Tynes

Kehlani singles chronology
"Think of Me" (2025)	"Folded" (2025)	"Sugar Sweet" (2025)

Music video
- "Folded" on YouTube

"Folded" is a song by American singer Kehlani. It was released on June 13, 2025, via Atlantic Records as the lead single from her self-titled fifth studio album. It was produced by Andre Harris, D.K. The Punisher, Don Mills and Khris Riddick-Tynes.

"Folded" became her first song to enter the top 10 of the Billboard Hot 100, peaking at number six in January 2026, becoming her most commercially successful song as a solo artist. It also reached the top 10 in New Zealand, the Philippines, and Suriname. The track received critical acclaim by contemporary music critics and won both Best R&B Performance and Best R&B Song at the 68th Annual Grammy Awards.

== Background ==
“Folded” was created during a recording session in Miami, originally intended for a feature that ultimately did not materialize. To make use of the studio time, Kehlani and a team of producers experimented with new material. The beat of the song was originally sent to André Harris by long-time collaborator D.K. the Punisher, in hopes it would be played for rapper Wale. Kehlani said: “The next day, we were listening to it and we realized, ‘Oh, this is so serious. This is such a crazy song.’ We almost had no idea, because we were just in the zone, it was so natural. There was no deep thought. It just happened.”

== Composition and lyrics ==
"Folded" is an R&B song that critics have noted shows inspiration from singer Brandy (who would later feature on a remix). Over an instrumental composed of strings, guitar and drums, Kehlani hopes to rekindle a romantic relationship with her lover. The singer acknowledges that she may have overreacted in leaving her ex ("I know I didn't have to walk away / All I had to do was ask for space"), before asking them to come pick up their clothes that they had left behind, which have also been folded.

== Critical reception ==
Upon its release, "Folded" received critical acclaim by contemporary music critics, who singled out the song’s lyricism and vocals for praise. Pitchfork, Los Angeles Times, Billboard, Rolling Stone and Complex listed it among the best songs of 2025. Robin Murray of Clash called it "sensual and alluring". Zachary Horvath of HotNewHipHop commented "Not only is it well written and conveys the proper emotions, the rhythm on it is infectious. The guitar melody hanging underneath the drums adds a sensual element that takes things up a notch. Of course, the vocals are buttery smooth, making this a complete record overall." Zsana Joyelle of Soul Bounce wrote, "Lyrics like, 'I know it's getting cold out, but it's not frozen,' and, 'I don't need roses / Just need some flowers from my garden / Can't you go back to how you loved on me when you started?,' aren't just poetic, they truly capture the theme of longing. Sonically, the strings and the guitar loop under the beat complement Kehlani's voice perfectly. As always, the Oakland native brings smooth, captivating vocals and layered backgrounds that sound heaven-sent." She added, "A standout moment comes on the second hook. Kehlani makes a few changes to set this one apart from the first, with new riffs and runs, rhythmic shifts, and even holding some notes longer than others. They even flirt with a key change as they shift tones on the lyrics, 'Meet me at my door while it's still open. This is a nice track and borrows from the Sex Drive recording, released in 1994, 90s vibe: the stems string arrangement, wah-wah guitars, and piano stems, Rhodes, other lyrical elements produced by songwriter Dayna DMystro Staggs Sr."

== Awards and nominations ==
Award and nominations for "Folded"
Year	Ceremony	Award	Result	Ref.
2026	American Music Awards	Song of the Year	Nominated	
2026	American Music Awards	Best R&B Song	Nominated	
2026	BET Awards	Video of the Year	Won	
2026	BET Awards	Viewer's Choice Award	Nominated	
2026	Grammy Awards	Best R&B Performance	Won	
2026	Grammy Awards	Best R&B Song	Won	
2026	iHeartRadio Music Awards	R&B Song of the Year	Won	
2026	NAACP Image Awards	Outstanding Soul/R&B Song	Nominated	
2026	NAACP Image Awards	Outstanding Music Video/Visual Album	Nominated	
2026	Soul Train Music Awards	R&B/Soul Song of The Year	Pending	

== Remixes ==
American rapper Max B released a remix to the song on his 2025 mixtape Public Domain 7. Rapper HavinMotion also released a remix to the track, titled "Druggin N Thuggin".

=== Remix EP ===
On October 22, 2025, Kehlani announced an EP of remixes, titled "Folded Homage Pack" featuring remixes with singers Brandy, JoJo, Mario, Ne-Yo, Tank, and Toni Braxton. The EP was released on October 24, 2025.

== Performances ==
In November 2025, Kehlani performed the song on Jimmy Kimmel Live!, featuring laundromat-inspired visuals. In January 2026, she performed the song on video as part of Spotify's Live Room series. Kehlani also performed "Folded" at the 2026 BET Awards.

== Music video ==
The music video for the song, directed by City James, was released on June 26, 2025, through the singer's YouTube channel.

== Charts ==
=== Weekly charts ===
Weekly chart performance for "Folded"
Chart (2025–2026)	Peak position
Australia (ARIA)	38
Australia Hip Hop/R&B (ARIA)	2
Canada Hot 100 (Billboard)	24
Canada CHR/Top 40 (Billboard)	13
Canada Hot AC (Billboard)	40
Global 200 (Billboard)	22
Ireland (IRMA)	73
Japan Hot Overseas (Billboard Japan)	18
Lebanon English (Lebanese Top 20)	12
Malaysia (Billboard)	25
Netherlands (Single Top 100)	88
New Zealand (Recorded Music NZ)	7
Nicaragua Anglo Airplay (Monitor Latino)	2
Nigeria (TurnTable Top 100)	48
Peru Anglo Airplay (Monitor Latino)	7
Philippines (IFPI)	4
Philippines (Philippines Hot 100)	2
Portugal (AFP)	60
Puerto Rico Anglo Airplay (Monitor Latino)	9
South Africa Airplay (TOSAC)	13
South Africa Streaming (TOSAC)	27
Suriname (Nationale Top 40)	2
UK Singles (Official Charts)	20
UK Hip Hop/R&B (Official Charts)	2
US Billboard Hot 100	6
US Adult Contemporary (Billboard)	10
US Adult Pop Airplay (Billboard)	30
US Hot R&B/Hip-Hop Songs (Billboard)	1
US Pop Airplay (Billboard)	3
US R&B/Hip-Hop Airplay (Billboard)	1
US Rhythmic Airplay (Billboard)	1

=== Year-end charts ===
Year-end chart performance for "Folded"
Chart (2025)	Position
New Zealand (Recorded Music NZ)	25
Philippines (Philippines Hot 100)	24
US Billboard Hot 100	98
US Hot R&B/Hip-Hop Songs (Billboard)	23
US Rhythmic Airplay (Billboard)	43

== Certifications ==
Certifications for "Folded"
Region	Certification	Certified units/sales
Australia (ARIA)	Platinum	70,000^{‡}
Canada (Music Canada)	3× Platinum	240,000^{‡}
New Zealand (RMNZ)	3× Platinum	90,000^{‡}
Portugal (AFP)	Gold	12,000^{‡}
South Africa (RISA)	Platinum	40,000^{‡}
United Kingdom (BPI)	Gold	400,000^{‡}
United States (RIAA)	2× Platinum	2,000,000^{‡}
^{‡} Sales+streaming figures based on certification alone.

== Release history ==
Release dates and formats for "Folded"
Region	Date	Format(s)	Label(s)	Ref.
United States	October 28, 2025	Contemporary hit radio	Atlantic	
