= Kehlani discography =

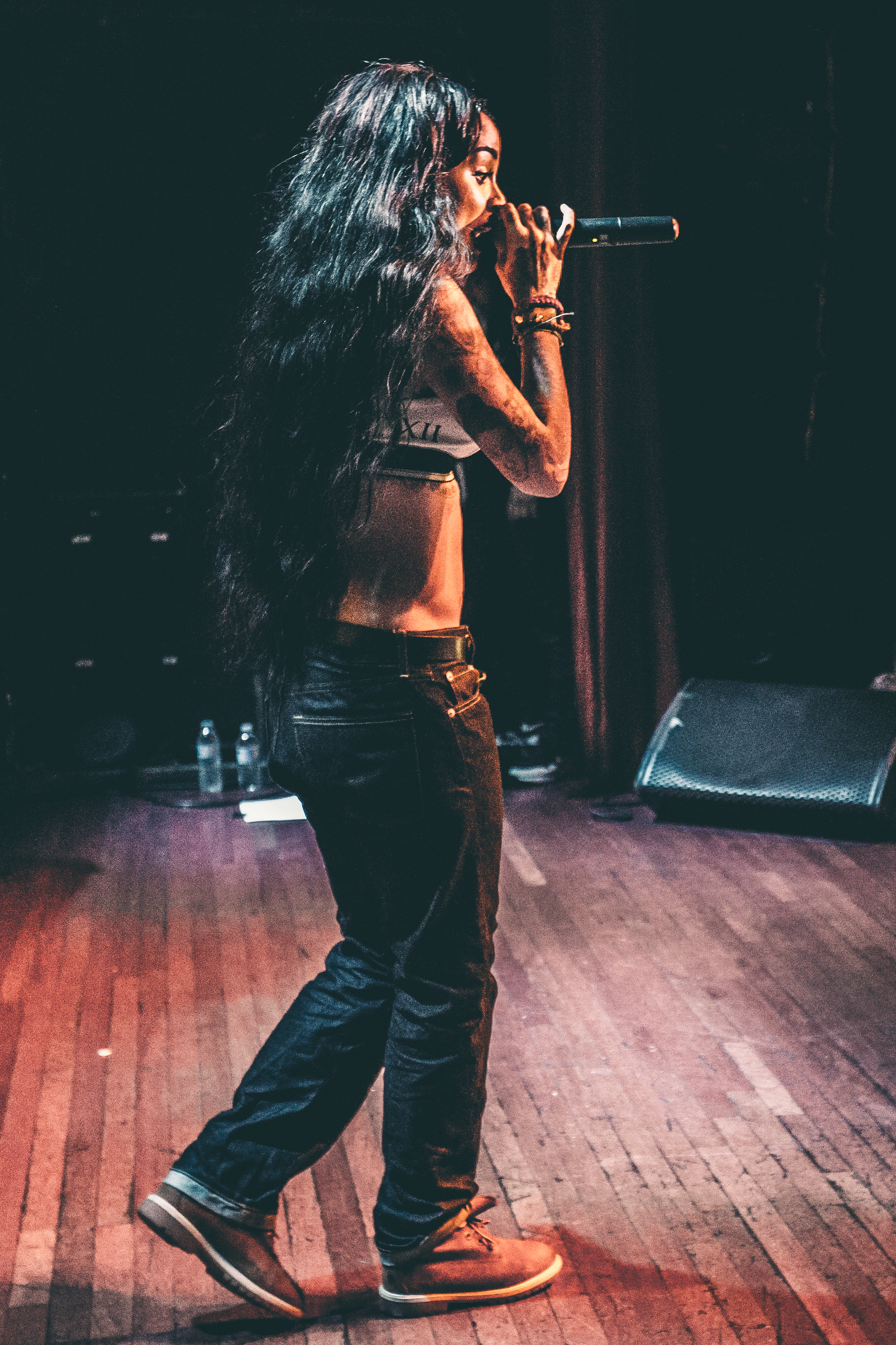
- Kehlani in 2015
- Studio albums: 5
- Singles: 74
- Mixtapes: 4
- Promotional singles: 15

The discography of Kehlani, an American singer and songwriter, consists of five studio albums, four mixtapes, and 74 singles (including 28 as a featured artist). After releasing their debut commercial mixtape, Cloud 19 (2014), Kehlani would re-release the record on streaming services on its seven-year anniversary in 2021. Their second commercial mixtape, You Should Be Here (2015), reached at number 36 on the US Billboard 200. Their debut studio album, SweetSexySavage (2017), reached at number three on the Billboard 200. In 2018, Kehlani was featured on American rapper Cardi B's single, "Ring", from her debut studio album, Invasion of Privacy, in which had reached at number 28 on the US Billboard Hot 100. Their third commercial mixtape, While We Wait (2019), reached at number nine on the Billboard 200. Their second studio album, It Was Good Until It Wasn't (2020), debuted and peaked at number two on the Billboard 200. Their third studio album, Blue Water Road (2022), debuted and peaked at number 13 on the Billboard 200.

== Studio albums ==
List of studio albums, with selected details, chart positions and certifications
Title	Album details	Peak chart positions										Certifications
Title	Album details	US	US R&B /HH	US R&B	AUS	BEL (FL)	CAN	NLD	NZ	SWI	UK	Certifications
SweetSexySavage	Released: January 27, 2017; Label: Atlantic; Format: CD, LP, digital download, streaming	3	2	1	32	61	3	28	18	63	26	RIAA: Gold; BPI: Silver; RMNZ: Platinum
It Was Good Until It Wasn't	Released: May 8, 2020; Label: Atlantic; Format: CD, LP, cassette, digital download, streaming	2	2	1	17	38	4	28	6	51	10	BPI: Silver; RMNZ: Gold
Blue Water Road	Released: April 29, 2022; Label: Atlantic; Format: CD, LP, cassette, digital download, streaming	13	8	3	—	—	83	—	34	—	97	
Crash	Released: June 21, 2024; Label: Atlantic; Format: CD, LP, digital download, streaming	25	8	2	—	—	—	—	—	—	— (Note: Crash did not enter the UK Top 100 Albums Chart, but peaked at number one on the UK R&B Albums chart.)	
Kehlani	Released: April 24, 2026; Label: Atlantic; Format: CD, LP, digital download, streaming	4	1	1	18	63	14	32	10	44	28	
"—" denotes a recording that did not chart or was not released in that territory.

== Mixtapes ==
List of mixtapes, with selected details, chart positions and certifications
Title	Mixtape details	Peak chart positions										Certifications
Title	Mixtape details	US	US R&B /HH	US R&B	AUS	BEL (FL)	CAN	NLD	NZ	UK	UK R&B	Certifications
Cloud 19	Released: August 26, 2014; Label: Self-released; Format: CD, LP, digital download	—	—	—	—	—	—	—	—	—	—	
You Should Be Here	Released: April 28, 2015; Label: Self-released; Format: CD, LP, digital download	36	5	2	—	—	95	—	—	—	—	RIAA: Gold
While We Wait	Released: February 22, 2019; Label: TSNMI, Atlantic; Format: CD, LP, digital download	9	5	1	29	146	17	34	17	47	13	RIAA: Gold; RMNZ: Platinum
While We Wait 2	Released: August 28, 2024; Label: Atlantic; Format: CD, LP, digital download	—	—	20	—	—	—	—	—	—	—	
"—" denotes a recording that did not chart or was not released in that territory.

== Singles ==
=== As lead artist ===
List of singles as lead artist, with selected chart positions and certifications, showing year released and album name
Title	Year	Peak chart positions										Certifications	Album
Title	Year	US	US R&B /HH	US R&B	AUS	CAN	FRA	IRE	NZ	UK	WW	Certifications	Album
"FWU"	2015	—	—	—	—	—	—	—	—	—	—		Cloud 19
"The Way" (featuring Chance the Rapper)	2015	—	—	—	—	—	—	—	—	—	—	RIAA: Platinum; RMNZ: Gold	You Should Be Here
"Crzy"	2016	85	34	11	—	—	—	—	—	—	—	RIAA: Platinum; MC: Platinum; RMNZ: Gold	SweetSexySavage
"Distraction"	2016	85	42	13	—	—	—	—	—	—	—	RIAA: Platinum; RMNZ: Platinum	SweetSexySavage
"Gangsta"	2016	41	13	6	61	37	81	76	— (Note: "Gangsta" did not enter the NZ Top 40 Singles Chart, but peaked at number two on the NZ Heatseeker Singles Chart.)	57	—	RIAA: Platinum; BPI: Gold; MC: 3× Platinum; RMNZ: Platinum	Suicide Squad OST and SweetSexySavage (Deluxe)
"Keep On"	2017	—	—	21	—	—	—	—	— (Note: "Keep On" did not enter the NZ Top 40 Singles Chart, but peaked at number nine on the NZ Heatseeker Singles Chart.)	—	—		SweetSexySavage
"Good Life" (with G-Eazy)	2017	59	29	8	23	53	69	32	21	53	—	RIAA: Platinum; ARIA: Platinum; BPI: Silver; MC: 2× Platinum; RMNZ: Platinum	The Fate of the Furious: The Album
"Honey"	2017	—	—	—	—	—	—	—	—	—	—	RIAA: Gold; MC: Platinum; RMNZ: Platinum	Non-album singles
"Touch"	2017	—	—	—	—	—	—	—	—	—	—		Non-album singles
"Already Won"	2017	—	—	—	—	—	—	—	—	—	—		Non-album singles
"Again"	2018	—	—	—	—	—	—	—	—	—	—		Non-album singles
"Nights Like This" (featuring Ty Dolla Sign)	2019	67	31	4	41	61	—	27	28	25	—	RIAA: 3× Platinum; BPI: Platinum; MC: 4× Platinum; RMNZ: 3× Platinum	While We Wait
"Butterfly"	2019	—	—	—	—	—	—	—	—	—	—		While We Wait
"Nunya" (featuring Dom Kennedy)	2019	— (Note: "Nunya" did not enter the Billboard Hot 100, but peaked at number 22 on the Bubbling Under Hot 100 chart.)	—	13	—	—	—	—	— (Note: "Nunya" did not enter the NZ Top 40 Singles Chart, but peaked at number 13 on the NZ Hot Singles Chart.)	—	—	RIAA: Gold	While We Wait
"RPG" (featuring 6lack)	2019	—	—	20	—	—	—	—	— (Note: "RPG" did not enter the NZ Top 40 Singles Chart, but peaked at number 24 on the NZ Hot Singles Chart.)	—	—	RIAA: Gold	While We Wait
"Change" (with Arin Ray)	2019	—	—	—	—	—	—	—	—	—	—		Phases II
"Good Thing" (with Zedd)	2019	— (Note: "Good Thing" did not enter the Billboard Hot 100, but peaked at number 23 on the Bubbling Under Hot 100 chart.)	—	—	58	91	—	61	— (Note: "Good Thing" did not enter the NZ Top 40 Singles Chart, but peaked at number eight on the NZ Hot Singles Chart.)	92	—	ARIA: Platinum; RMNZ: Platinum	Non-album singles
"All Me" (featuring Keyshia Cole)	2019	— (Note: "All Me" did not enter the Billboard Hot 100, but peaked at number seven on the Bubbling Under Hot 100 chart.)	— (Note: "All Me" did not enter the Hot R&B/Hip-Hop Songs chart, but peaked at number two on the Bubbling Under Hot R&B/Hip-Hop Songs chart.)	14	—	—	—	—	— (Note: "All Me" did not enter the NZ Top 40 Singles Chart, but peaked at number seven on the NZ Hot Singles Chart.)	—	—	RIAA: Gold; RMNZ: Gold	Non-album singles
"Konclusions" (with YG)	2020	—	—	—	—	—	—	—	— (Note: "Konclusions" did not enter the NZ Top 40 Singles Chart, but peaked at number 27 on the NZ Hot Singles Chart.)	—	—		Non-album singles
"Can I" (solo or featuring Tory Lanez)	2020	50	20	4	—	—	—	—	— (Note: "Can I" did not enter the NZ Top 40 Singles Chart, but peaked at number 13 on the NZ Hot Singles Chart.)	85	—	RIAA: Gold; RMNZ: Gold	It Was Good Until It Wasn't
"Birthday" (with Disclosure and Syd)	2020	—	—	—	—	—	—	—	— (Note: "Birthday" did not enter the NZ Top 40 Singles Chart, but peaked at number 14 on the NZ Hot Singles Chart.)	81	—		Energy
"Take You Back" (with Russ)	2020	—	—	8	—	—	—	—	— (Note: "Take You Back" did not enter the NZ Top 40 Singles Chart, but peaked at number 10 on the NZ Hot Singles Chart.)	—	—		Non-album singles
"I Like Dat" (with T-Pain)	2021	97	36	9	—	—	—	—	— (Note: "I Like Dat" did not enter the NZ Top 40 Singles Chart, but peaked at number 18 on the NZ Hot Singles Chart.)	—	—	RIAA: Gold; RMNZ: Platinum	Non-album singles
"Altar"	2021	—	—	16	—	—	—	—	— (Note: "Altar" did not enter the NZ Top 40 Singles Chart, but peaked at number 26 on the NZ Hot Singles Chart.)	—	—		Blue Water Road
"Beautiful Lies" (with Yung Bleu)	2021	65	20	5	—	—	—	—	— (Note: "Beautiful Lies" did not enter the NZ Top 40 Singles Chart, but peaked at number 18 on the NZ Hot Singles Chart.)	—	—	RIAA: Gold	Moon Boy
"Little Story"	2022	—	—	17	—	—	—	—	—	—	—		Blue Water Road
"Up at Night" (featuring Justin Bieber)	2022	— (Note: "Up at Night" did not enter the Billboard Hot 100, but peaked at number 14 on the Bubbling Under Hot 100 chart.)	—	13	—	78	—	94	— (Note: "Up at Night" did not enter the NZ Top 40 Singles Chart, but peaked at number five on the NZ Hot Singles Chart.)	90	140		Blue Water Road
"Everything"	2022	—	—	17	—	—	—	—	— (Note: "Everything" did not enter the NZ Top 40 Singles Chart, but peaked at number 26 on the NZ Hot Singles Chart.)	—	—		Blue Water Road
"After Hours"	2024	72	21	5	—	—	—	—	— (Note: "After Hours" did not enter the NZ Top 40 Singles Chart, but peaked at number seven on the NZ Hot Singles Chart.)	—	—	RIAA: Gold; BPI: Silver; MC: Platinum; RMNZ: Platinum	Crash
"Next 2 U"	2024	—	—	—	—	—	—	—	— (Note: "Next 2 U" did not enter the NZ Top 40 Singles Chart, but peaked at number 18 on the NZ Hot Singles Chart.)	—	—		Crash
"Crash"	2024	—	—	—	—	—	—	—	—	—	—		Crash
"When He's Not There" (featuring Lucky Daye)	2024	—	—	—	—	—	—	—	—	—	—		While We Wait 2
"Think of Me" (with Hugel, David Guetta, and Daecolm)	2025	—	—	—	—	—	—	—	—	—	—		Non-album single
"Folded"	2025	6	1	1	38	24	—	73	7	20	22	RIAA: 2× Platinum; ARIA: Platinum; BPI: Gold; MC: 3× Platinum; RMNZ: 3× Platinum	Kehlani
"Out the Window"	2025	63	10	7	—	91	—	—	— (Note: "Out the Window" did not enter the NZ Top 40 Singles Chart, but peaked at number 1 on the NZ Hot Singles Chart.)	—	—		Kehlani
"Back and Forth" (featuring Missy Elliott)	2026	— (Note: "Back and Forth" did not enter the Billboard Hot 100, but peaked at number 25 on the Bubbling Under Hot 100 chart.)	39	10	—	—	—	—	— (Note: "Back and Forth" did not enter the NZ Top 40 Singles Chart, but peaked at number 10 on the NZ Hot Singles Chart.)	—	—		Kehlani
"Shoulda Never" (featuring Usher)	2026	76	18	11	—	—	—	—	— (Note: "Shoulda Never" did not enter the NZ Top 40 Singles Chart, but peaked at number 8 on the NZ Hot Singles Chart.)	—	—		Kehlani
"—" denotes releases that did not chart or were not released in that territory.

=== As featured artist ===
List of singles as featured artist, with selected chart positions and certifications, showing year released and album name
Title	Year	Peak chart positions							Certifications	Album
Title	Year	US	US R&B /HH	US R&B	AUS	CAN	NZ	UK	Certifications	Album
"Dance Floor" (Nick Cannon featuring Kehlani)	2014	—	—	—	—	—	—	—		White People Party Music
"Lock It Up" (Marc E. Bassy featuring Kehlani)	2014	—	—	—	—	—	—	—		Only the Poets
"Stay Up" (Dyme-A-Duzin featuring Kehlani)	2014	—	—	—	—	—	—	—		Hip Hope
"Preach" (Ambré Perkins featuring Kehlani)	2015	—	—	—	—	—	—	—		Non-album single
"Wrong" (Zayn featuring Kehlani)	2016	— (Note: "Wrong" did not enter the Billboard Hot 100, but peaked at number 13 on the Bubbling Under Hot 100 chart.)	—	—	—	96	—	118		Mind of Mine
"You" (Belly featuring Kehlani)	2016	—	—	—	—	—	—	—		Another Day in Paradise
"No Service in the Hills" (Ambré Perkins featuring Kehlani)	2016	—	—	—	—	—	—	—		Non-album single
"Heebiejeebies" (Aminé featuring Kehlani)	2017	—	—	—	—	—	—	—	RIAA: Platinum; RMNZ: Platinum	Good for You
"Cigarettes & Cush" (Stormzy featuring Kehlani and Lily Allen)	2017	—	—	—	—	—	—	30	BPI: Gold	Gang Signs & Prayer
"Faking It" (Calvin Harris featuring Kehlani and Lil Yachty)	2017	94	38	8	—	99	—	97	RIAA: Platinum; ARIA: Gold; BPI: Silver; MC: Gold; RMNZ: Platinum	Funk Wav Bounces Vol. 1
"Done for Me" (Charlie Puth featuring Kehlani)	2018	53	—	—	97	65	— (Note: "Done for Me" did not enter the NZ Top 40 Singles Chart, but peaked at number six on the NZ Heatseeker Singles Chart.)	45	RIAA: Platinum; ARIA: Platinum; BPI: Silver; MC: Gold; RMNZ: Gold	Voicenotes
"Nowhere Fast" (Eminem featuring Kehlani)	2018	—	— (Note: "Nowhere Fast" did not enter the Hot R&B/Hip-Hop Songs chart, but peaked at number nine on the Bubbling Under Hot R&B/Hip-Hop Songs chart.)	—	76	81	—	—	ARIA: Gold; RMNZ: Gold	Revival
"Playinwitme" (Kyle featuring Kehlani)	2018	— (Note: "Playinwitme" did not enter the Billboard Hot 100, but peaked at number two on the Bubbling Under Hot 100 Singles chart.)	— (Note: "Playinwitme" did not enter the Hot R&B/Hip-Hop Songs chart, but peaked at number one on the Bubbling Under Hot R&B/Hip-Hop Songs chart.)	—	38	46	13	61	RIAA: 2× Platinum; ARIA: Platinum; BPI: Silver; MC: Platinum; RMNZ: 2× Platinum	Light of Mine
"What I Need" (Hayley Kiyoko featuring Kehlani)	2018	—	—	—	— (Note: "What I Need" did not enter the Top 100 Singles Chart, but peaked at number 11 on the Hitseekers Singles chart.)	—	— (Note: "What I Need" did not enter the NZ Top 40 Singles Chart, but peaked at number eight on the NZ Heatseeker Singles Chart.)	—		Expectations
"Ring" (Cardi B featuring Kehlani)	2018	28	19	—	—	61	— (Note: "Ring" did not enter the NZ Top 40 Singles Chart, but peaked at number four on the NZ Heatseeker Singles Chart.)	—	RIAA: 4× Platinum; BPI: Silver; MC: 2× Platinum; RMNZ: 2× Platinum	Invasion of Privacy
"Body Count (Remix)" (Jessie Reyez featuring Normani and Kehlani)	2018	—	—	—	—	—	—	—		Being Human in Public
"Ride" (YK Osiris featuring Kehlani)	2019	—	—	—	—	—	—	—		The Golden Child
"Morning" (Teyana Taylor featuring Kehlani)	2019	— (Note: "Morning" did not enter the Billboard Hot 100, but peaked at number 23 on the Bubbling Under Hot 100 chart.)	— (Note: "Morning" did not enter the Hot R&B/Hip-Hop Songs chart, but peaked at number nine on the Bubbling Under Hot R&B/Hip-Hop Songs chart.)	15	—	—	— (Note: "Morning" did not enter the NZ Top 40 Singles Chart, but peaked at number 27 on the NZ Hot Singles Chart.)	—	RIAA: Gold	The Album
"I Still" (Van Leeuwen featuring Kehlani)	2020	—	—	—	—	—	—	—		Non-album singles
"Touch Me (Remix)" (Victoria Monét featuring Kehlani)	2020	—	—	—	—	—	—	—		Non-album singles
"Cupid's Curse" (Phora featuring Kehlani)	2020	—	—	—	—	—	—	—		With Love Ii
"At My Worst (Remix)" (Pink Sweats featuring Kehlani)	2021	— (Note: "At My Worst" did not enter the Billboard Hot 100, but peaked at number 22 on the Bubbling Under Hot 100 chart.)	—	—	—	77	— (Note: "At My Worst" (Remix) did not enter the NZ Top 40 Singles Chart, but peaked at number 17 on the NZ Hot Singles Chart.)	—	RIAA: Platinum; MC: Platinum; RMNZ: Gold	Non-album singles
"Love You Too" (Lil Durk featuring Kehlani)	2021	—	—	—	—	—	—	—		Non-album singles
"Back Together" (Amorphous featuring Kehlani)	2021	—	—	—	—	—	—	—		Non-album singles
"Ur Best Friend" (Kiana Ledé featuring Kehlani)	2021	—	—	—	—	—	— (Note: "Ur Best Friend" did not enter the NZ Top 40 Singles Chart, but peaked at number 27 on the NZ Hot Singles Chart.)	—		Non-album singles
"Kehlani (Remix)" (Jordan Adetunji featuring Kehlani)	2024	24	—	—	—	—	— (Note: "Kehlani" (Remix) did not enter the NZ Top 40 Singles Chart, but peaked at number nine on the NZ Hot Singles Chart.)	—	RIAA: Platinum	Non-album singles
"Worst Behaviour" (kwn featuring Kehlani)	2025	—	50	—	—	—	—	—		Non-album singles
"Sugar Sweet" (Mariah Carey featuring Shenseea and Kehlani)	2025	—	—	—	—	—	— (Note: "Sugar Sweet" did not enter the NZ Top 40 Singles Chart, but peaked at number 16 on the NZ Hot Singles Chart.)	—		Here for It All
"Safe" (Cardi B featuring Kehlani)	2025	26	3	—	—	93	— (Note: "Safe" did not enter the NZ Top 40 Singles Chart, but peaked at number 5 on the NZ Hot Singles Chart.)	98		Am I the Drama?
"Go" (Karri featuring Kehlani)	2025	—	—	—	—	—	— (Note: "Go" did not enter the NZ Top 40 Singles Chart, but peaked at number 39 on the NZ Hot Singles Chart.)	—		Slider II
"See Right Through Me" (Isaia Huron featuring Kehlani)	2025	—	—	—	—	—	— (Note: "See Right Through Me" did not enter the NZ Top 40 Singles Chart, but peaked at number 38 on the NZ Hot Singles Chart.)	—		Non-album singles
"—" denotes releases that did not chart or were not released in that territory.

=== Promotional singles ===
List of promotional singles, with selected chart positions and certifications, showing year released and album name
Title	Year	Peak chart positions							Certifications	Album
Title	Year	US	US R&B /HH	US R&B	AUS	CAN	NZ Hot	UK	Certifications	Album
"Antisummerluv"	2013	—	—	—	—	—	—	—		Non-album singles
"Til the Morning"	2014	—	—	—	—	—	—	—		Non-album singles
"Get Away"	2014	—	—	—	—	—	—	—		Cloud 19
"First Position"	2014	—	—	—	—	—	—	—		Cloud 19
"How That Taste"	2015	—	—	—	—	—	—	—		You Should Be Here
"Down for You" (featuring BJ the Chicago Kid)	2015	—	—	—	—	—	—	—		You Should Be Here
"Champion" (with G-Eazy and Iamsu! featuring Lil B)	2015	—	—	—	—	—	—	—		Non-album singles
"Tore Up"	2015	—	—	—	—	—	—	—		Non-album singles
"Did I"	2015	—	— (Note: "Did I" did not enter the Hot R&B/Hip-Hop Songs chart, but peaked at number 18 on the R&B/Hip-Hop Digital Song Sales chart.)	—	—	—	—	—		Non-album singles
"24/7"	2016	—	—	—	—	—	—	—		Non-album singles
"Advice"	2016	—	—	—	—	—	—	—		SweetSexySavage
"Undercover"	2017	—	—	—	—	—	—	—		SweetSexySavage
"Do U Dirty"	2017	—	—	—	—	—	—	—		SweetSexySavage
"You Know Wassup"	2019	—	—	—	—	—	—	—		Non-album single
"Get Me" (Justin Bieber featuring Kehlani)	2020	93	44	11	61	48	4	61		Changes
"Valentine's Day (Shameful)"	2020	—	—	—	—	—	—	—		Non-album single
"Toxic"	2020	68	31	6	—	—	31	—	RIAA: Gold; BPI: Silver; MC: Platinum; RMNZ: Gold	It Was Good Until It Wasn't
"Everybody Business"	2020	— (Note: "Everybody Business" did not enter the Billboard Hot 100, but peaked at number ten on the Bubbling Under Hot 100 chart.)	—	16	—	—	—	—		It Was Good Until It Wasn't
"F&MU"	2020	— (Note: "F&MU" did not enter the Billboard Hot 100, but peaked at number seven on the Bubbling Under Hot 100 chart.)	—	13	—	—	—	—		It Was Good Until It Wasn't
"—" denotes a title that did not chart, or was not released in that territory.

== Other charted and certified songs ==
List of songs, with selected chart positions and certifications, showing year released and album name
Title	Year	Peak chart positions						Certifications	Album
Title	Year	US	US R&B /HH	US R&B	CAN	NZ Hot	UK	Certifications	Album
"You Should Be Here"	2015	—	—	—	—	—	—	RIAA: Gold	You Should Be Here
"Everything Will Be OK" (G-Eazy featuring Kehlani)	2015	—	— (Note: "Everything Will be OK" did not enter the Hot R&B/Hip-Hop Songs chart, but peaked at number six on the Bubbling Under Hot R&B/Hip-Hop Songs chart.)	—	—	—	—	RIAA: Gold	When It's Dark Out
"Feel" (Post Malone featuring Kehlani)	2016	—	—	—	—	—	—	RIAA: Platinum; BPI: Silver; MC: Platinum; RMNZ: Gold	Stoney
"Footsteps" (featuring Musiq Soulchild)	2019	—	—	17	—	21	—	RIAA: Gold	While We Wait
"Too Deep"	2019	—	—	22	—	—	—		While We Wait
"Morning Glory"	2019	—	—	24	—	—	—		While We Wait
"Feels"	2019	—	— (Note: "Feels" did not enter the Hot R&B/Hip-Hop Songs chart, but peaked at number 23 on the R&B/Hip-Hop Digital Song Sales chart.)	16	—	14	—		While We Wait
"Bad News"	2020	— (Note: "Bad News" did not enter the Billboard Hot 100, but peaked at number nine on the Bubbling Under Hot 100 chart.)	—	15	—	—	—		It Was Good Until It Wasn't
"Water"	2020	— (Note: "Water" did not enter the Billboard Hot 100, but peaked at number eight on the Bubbling Under Hot 100 chart.)	—	14	—	19	—		It Was Good Until It Wasn't
"Change Your Life" (featuring Jhené Aiko)	2020	80	37	9	—	15	—		It Was Good Until It Wasn't
"Hate the Club" (featuring Masego)	2020	— (Note: "Hate the Club" did not enter the Billboard Hot 100, but peaked at number 22 on the Bubbling Under Hot 100 chart.)	—	18	—	—	—		It Was Good Until It Wasn't
"Serial Lover"	2020	—	—	21	—	—	—		It Was Good Until It Wasn't
"Can You Blame Me" (featuring Lucky Daye)	2020	—	—	22	—	—	—		It Was Good Until It Wasn't
"Grieving" (featuring James Blake)	2020	—	—	25	—	—	—		It Was Good Until It Wasn't
"Open (Passionate)"	2020	—	—	24	—	—	—		It Was Good Until It Wasn't
"Ride for You" (Meek Mill featuring Kehlani)	2021	95	41	—	—	—	—		Expensive Pain
"Any Given Sunday" (featuring Blxst)	2022	—	—	22	—	—	—		Blue Water Road
"Wish I Never"	2022	—	—	23	—	—	—		Blue Water Road
"My Go To" (YoungBoy Never Broke Again featuring Kehlani)	2022	— (Note: "My Go To" did not chart on the Billboard Hot 100, but peaked at number one on the Bubbling Under Hot 100 Singles chart.)	39	—	—	—	—		The Last Slimeto
"Anotha Luva" (featuring Lil Wayne)	2026	— (Note: "Anotha Luva" did not enter the Billboard Hot 100, but peaked at number 3 on the Bubbling Under Hot 100 chart.)	31	14	—	9	—		Kehlani
"No Such Thing" (featuring Clipse)	2026	— (Note: "No Such Thing" did not enter the Billboard Hot 100, but peaked at number 21 on the Bubbling Under Hot 100 chart.)	39	20	—	—	—		Kehlani
"I Need You" (featuring Brandy)	2026	— (Note: "I Need You" did not enter the Billboard Hot 100, but peaked at number 4 on the Bubbling Under Hot 100 chart.)	32	15	—	10	—		Kehlani
"Oooh"	2026	— (Note: "Oooh" did not enter the Billboard Hot 100, but peaked at number 7 on the Bubbling Under Hot 100 chart.)	35	17	—	—	—		Kehlani
"Still"	2026	—	32	25	—	—	—		Kehlani
"Pocket" (featuring Cardi B)	2026	— (Note: "Pocket" did not enter the Billboard Hot 100, but peaked at number 24 on the Bubbling Under Hot 100 chart.)	42	21	—	—	—		Kehlani
"Lights On" (featuring Big Sean)	2026	—	32	24	—	—	—		Kehlani
"Sweet Nuthins" (featuring Leon Thomas)	2026	—	48	23	—	11	—		Kehlani
"—" denotes a title that did not chart, or was not released in that territory.

== Guest appearances ==
List of guest appearances, with the respective artists, showing year released and album name
Title	Year	Artist	Album
"Never Goin' Broke"	2013	HBK Gang	Gang Forever
"Lock It Up"	2014	Marc E. Bassy	Only the Poets
"Stay Up"	2014	Dyme-A-Duzin	Hip Hope
"Desert of Mirages"	2014	Sage the Gemini, Berner	Remember Me
"For More"	2014	Lyfe Harris	none
"Glass House"	2014	Lyfe Harris	none
"Merlot"	2014	Down 2 Earth	none
"Just a Picture"	2015	Kyle	none
"Preach"	2015	Ambré Perkins	none
"Or Nah (Remix)"	2015	Tia NoMore	none
"Future"	2015	Khalil, Justin Bieber	none
"Doesn't Matter"	2015	Elhae	All Have Fallen
"Win"	2015	G-Eazy	none
"Everything Will Be OK"	2015	G-Eazy	When It's Dark Out
"Retribution"	2015	Pusha T	King Push – Darkest Before Dawn: The Prelude
"Feel"	2016	Post Malone	Stoney
"Night Night"	2017	Cashmere Cat	9
"Made Love First"	2017	Marc E. Bassy	Gossip Columns
"Location (Remix)"	2017	Khalid, Lil Wayne	none
"Light Up"	2017	JP Killed IT	none
"Crash & Burn"	2017	G-Eazy	The Beautiful & Damned
"Nowhere Fast"	2017	Eminem	Revival
"163 För Evigt (Remix)"	2018	Cherrie	none
"Let Me Live"	2018	—N/a	A Wrinkle in Time
"Icy Grl (Bae Mix)"	2018	Saweetie	none
"Rich Girl Mood"	2018	Dounia	The Avant-Garden
"Anytime"	2019	Jean Deaux, ROMderful	Empathy
"Hit My Phone"	2020	Megan Thee Stallion	Suga
"B.S." (Remix)	2020	Jhené Aiko	Chilombo (deluxe edition)
"Universe"	2020	Ty Dolla Sign	Featuring Ty Dolla Sign
"Coupé"	2021	AJ Tracey	Flu Game
"Ride for You"	2021	Meek Mill	Expensive Pain
"My Go To"	2022	YoungBoy Never Broke Again	The Last Slimeto
"Mind Your Business (Bosses in Love)"	2023	Diddy, Ty Dolla Sign	The Love Album: Off the Grid
"Allah Yihmeeki"	2024	Saint Levant	Deira
"IWH2BMX (Unlocked)"	2024	Flo	Access All Areas
"Safe"	2025	Cardi B	Am I the Drama?
"Blue Moon"	2026	Zara Larsson	Midnight Sun: Girls Trip
