= SweetSexySavage World Tour =

2017 concert tour by Kehlani

- Tour by Kehlani
- Associated album: SweetSexySavage
- Start date: February 21, 2017
- End date: November 18, 2017
- No. of shows: 59 in North America; 10 in Europe; 2 in Asia; 8 in Oceania; 79 in total

Kehlani concert chronology
- SweetSexySavage World Tour (2017); Blue Water Road Trip (2022)

The SweetSexySavage World Tour was the first concert tour by American singer Kehlani, in support of their debut studio album SweetSexySavage (2017). The tour began on February 21, 2017, in Montreal, Quebec, at Club Soda, and concluded on November 18, 2017, in Mexico City, Mexico, at the Corona Capital festival.

== Background ==
On December 2, 2016, Kehlani revealed a list of some cities that would be included on their 2017 tour, and on December 8, 2016, they announced a more complete list of tour dates across Europe and North America. Kehlani also revealed that Ella Mai, Jahkoy, and Noodles (Micah Mahinay), would be opening for the tour. In addition, Kehlani's godson, cousin, Marteen Estevez accompanied as an opener for select dates on the tour. General sale tickets for all of the dates announced on December 2, 2016, went on sale on December 14, 2016. More dates were gradually announced as well as various dates for music festivals across the United States. On March 14, 2017, Kehlani announced via social media that they would be having hernia surgery, forcing them to postpone the remaining European dates, although they were ultimately cancelled. On March 16, 2017, several dates in Australia and New Zealand were announced. Various dates in North America were also rescheduled.

== Set list ==
This set list is representative of the show on February 21, 2017, in Montreal, Quebec. It does not represent the set list from all of the shows.

1. "Keep On"
2. "Distraction"
3. "Do U Dirty"
4. "Get Away"
5. "The Way"
6. "Too Much"
7. "Get Like"
8. "Gangsta"
9. "I Wanna Be"
10. "Everything Is Yours"
11. "Not Used to It"
12. "Hold Me by the Heart"
13. "Advice"
14. "Piece of Mind"
15. "Escape"
16. "Undercover"
17. "In My Feelings"
18. "Personal"
19. "Crzy"
20. "Thank You"

== Shows ==
List of concerts, showing date, city, country, venue, opening acts, tickets sold, and gross revenue.
Date	City	Country	Venue	Opening acts
North America
February 21, 2017	Montreal	Canada	Club Soda	Jahkoy; Ella Mai; Noodles
February 22, 2017	New York City	United States	PlayStation Theater	Jahkoy; Ella Mai; Noodles
February 24, 2017	Boston	United States	Royale Nightclub	Jahkoy; Ella Mai; Noodles
February 25, 2017	Boston	United States	Royale Nightclub	Jahkoy; Ella Mai; Noodles
Europe
February 28, 2017	Dublin	Ireland	The Academy	Ella Mai; Noodles
March 1, 2017	Glasgow	Scotland	O_{2} ABC Glasgow	Ella Mai; Noodles
March 3, 2017	Manchester	England	The Ritz	Jahkoy; Ella Mai; Noodles
March 4, 2017	Birmingham	England	O_{2} Institute Birmingham	Jahkoy; Ella Mai; Noodles
March 5, 2017	London	England	KOKO	Jahkoy; Ella Mai; Noodles
March 6, 2017	London	England	KOKO	Jahkoy; Ella Mai; Noodles
March 8, 2017	London	England	O_{2} Shepherd's Bush Empire	Jahkoy; Ella Mai; Noodles
March 10, 2017	Oslo	Norway	Parkteatret	Ella Mai; Noodles
March 11, 2017	Stockholm	Sweden	Nalen	Ella Mai; Noodles
March 12, 2017	Copenhagen	Denmark	Amager Bio	Ella Mai; Noodles
North America
April 16, 2017^{[A]}	Indio	United States	Empire Polo Club	—N/a
April 18, 2017	Tempe	United States	Marquee Theatre	Jahkoy; Ella Mai; Noodles
April 20, 2017	Las Vegas	United States	Brooklyn Bowl Las Vegas	Jahkoy; Ella Mai; Noodles
April 23, 2017^{[A]}	Indio	United States	Empire Polo Club	—N/a
April 24, 2017	Santa Cruz	United States	The Catalyst	Jahkoy; Ella Mai; Noodles
April 25, 2017	Sacramento	United States	Ace of Spades	Marteen; Jahkoy; Ella Mai; Noodles
April 27, 2017	Reno	United States	Jub Jub's	Jahkoy; Ella Mai; Noodles
April 28, 2017	Eugene	United States	W.O.W. Hall	Marteen; Jahkoy; Ella Mai; Noodles
April 29, 2017	Seattle	United States	Showbox SoDo	Marteen; Jahkoy; Ella Mai; Noodles
May 1, 2017	Vancouver	Canada	Vogue Theatre	Jahkoy; Ella Mai; Noodles
May 2, 2017	Portland	United States	Crystal Ballroom	Marteen; Jahkoy; Ella Mai; Noodles
May 4, 2017	Salt Lake City	United States	The Depot	Marteen; Jahkoy; Ella Mai; Noodles
May 6, 2017	Minneapolis	United States	Music Hall FKA Mill City Nights	Jahkoy; Ella Mai; Noodles
May 7, 2017	Chicago	United States	Concord Music Hall	Jahkoy; Ella Mai; Noodles
May 10, 2017	Detroit	United States	The Fillmore Detroit	Jahkoy; Ella Mai; Noodles
May 11, 2017	Louisville	United States	Mercury Ballroom	Jahkoy; Ella Mai; Noodles
May 12, 2017	Nashville	United States	Marathon Music Works	Jahkoy; Ella Mai; Noodles
May 15, 2017	Lawrence	United States	The Granada Theater	Jahkoy; Ella Mai; Noodles
May 16, 2017	Lincoln	United States	Bourbon Theatre	Jahkoy; Ella Mai; Noodles
May 17, 2017	Denver	United States	Ogden Theatre	Jahkoy; Ella Mai; Noodles
May 19, 2017	Dallas	United States	South Side Music Hall	Marteen; Jahkoy; Ella Mai; Noodles
May 20, 2017	New Orleans	United States	Republic NOLA	Jahkoy; Ella Mai; Noodles
May 21, 2017	Houston	United States	Warehouse Live	Marteen; Jahkoy; Ella Mai; Noodles
May 23, 2017	Baton Rouge	United States	Varsity Theatre	Jahkoy; Ella Mai; Noodles
May 24, 2017	Austin	United States	Emo's	Marteen; Jahkoy; Ella Mai; Noodles
May 25, 2017	San Antonio	United States	Alamo City Music Hall	Marteen; Jahkoy; Ella Mai; Noodles
May 27, 2017	Atlanta	United States	The Tabernacle	Marteen; Jahkoy; Ella Mai; Noodles
May 28, 2017	Charlotte	United States	The Underground	Jahkoy; Ella Mai; Noodles
May 31, 2017	Richmond	United States	The National	Jahkoy; Ella Mai; Noodles
June 1, 2017	Norfolk	United States	The NorVa	Jahkoy; Ella Mai; Noodles
June 2, 2017^{[B]}	New York City	United States	Randall's Island Park	—N/a
June 4, 2017	Toronto	Canada	REBEL	Marteen; Jahkoy; Ella Mai; Noodles
June 5, 2017	Grand Rapids	United States	The Intersection	Marteen; Jahkoy; Ella Mai; Noodles
June 7, 2017	Chicago	United States	Concord Music Hall	Marteen; Jahkoy; Ella Mai; Noodles
June 8, 2017	St. Louis	United States	The Ready Room	Jahkoy; Ella Mai; Noodles
June 9, 2017	Madison	United States	Orpheum Theatre	Marteen; Jahkoy; Ella Mai; Noodles
June 12, 2017	Tucson	United States	Rialto Theatre	Marteen; Jahkoy; Ella Mai; Noodles
June 14, 2017	Santa Cruz	United States	The Catalyst	Marteen; Jahkoy; Ella Mai; Noodles
June 15, 2017	Santa Cruz	United States	The Catalyst	Marteen; Jahkoy; Ella Mai; Noodles
June 17, 2017	San Francisco	United States	Bill Graham Civic Auditorium	Marteen; Jahkoy; Ella Mai; Noodles
June 18, 2017	Los Angeles	United States	The Novo	Marteen; Jahkoy; Ella Mai; Noodles
June 21, 2017	Sacramento	United States	Ace of Spades	Marteen; Jahkoy; Ella Mai; Noodles
June 23, 2017	Berkeley	United States	Hearst Greek Theatre	Marteen; Jahkoy; Ella Mai; Noodles
July 1, 2017	Honolulu	United States	The Republik	—N/a
July 2, 2017	Honolulu	United States	The Republik	—N/a
July 10, 2017	Philadelphia	United States	Electric Factory	Marteen; Jahkoy; Ella Mai; Noodles
July 11, 2017	Baltimore	United States	Rams Head Live!	Marteen; Jahkoy; Ella Mai; Noodles
July 13, 2017	Silver Spring	United States	The Fillmore Silver Spring	Marteen; Jahkoy; Ella Mai; Noodles
July 14, 2017	Greensboro	United States	Cone Denim Entertainment Center	Marteen; Jahkoy; Ella Mai; Noodles
July 15, 2017	Raleigh	United States	The Ritz	Marteen; Jahkoy; Ella Mai; Noodles
July 17, 2017	Fort Lauderdale	United States	Culture Room	Marteen; Jahkoy; Ella Mai; Noodles
July 19, 2017	Orlando	United States	The Plaza Live	Marteen; Jahkoy; Ella Mai; Noodles
July 20, 2017	Tampa	United States	The Orpheum	Marteen; Jahkoy; Ella Mai; Noodles
July 23, 2017^{[C]}	Los Angeles	United States	Exposition Park	—N/a
Asia
August 19, 2017^{[D]}	Chiba	Japan	Makuhari Seaside Park	—N/a
August 20, 2017^{[D]}	Osaka	Japan	Maishima Sports Island	—N/a
Oceania
August 23, 2017	Auckland	New Zealand	Logan Campbell Centre	Noodles
August 25, 2017	Brisbane	Australia	Max Watt's House of Music	Noodles
August 26, 2017	Sydney	Australia	Enmore Theatre	Noodles
August 27, 2017	Melbourne	Australia	Forum Theatre	Noodles
August 29, 2017	Perth	Australia	Astor Theatre	Noodles
August 31, 2017	Sydney	Australia	Big Top Sydney	Noodles
North America
October 27, 2017^{[E]}	New Orleans	United States	City Park	—N/a
October 29, 2017^{[F]}	Los Angeles	United States	Exposition Park	—N/a
November 3, 2017^{[H]}	Chicago	United States	Riviera Theatre	Kodie Shane; Blaise Moore
November 12, 2017^{[H]}	McDade	United States	Sherwood Forest	—N/a
November 18, 2017^{[I]}	Mexico City	Mexico	Autódromo Hermanos Rodríguez	—N/a

=== Cancelled shows ===
List of postponed concerts, showing original date, city, country, venue, opening acts and reason for cancellation.
Date	City	Country	Venue	Opening acts	Reason
Europe
March 14, 2017	Berlin	Germany	Bi Nuu	Ella Mai; Noodles	Hernia surgery
March 15, 2017	Warsaw	Poland	Klub Proxima	Ella Mai; Noodles	Hernia surgery
March 17, 2017	Vienna	Austria	Grelle Forelle	Ella Mai; Noodles	Hernia surgery
March 18, 2017	Munich	Germany	Technikum	Ella Mai; Noodles	Hernia surgery
March 19, 2017	Zürich	Switzerland	Kaufleuten	Ella Mai; Noodles	Hernia surgery
March 21, 2017	Paris	France	Le Trianon	Ella Mai; Noodles	Hernia surgery
March 22, 2017	Brussels	Belgium	Ancienne Belgique	Ella Mai; Noodles	Hernia surgery
March 23, 2017	Amsterdam	Netherlands	Melkweg	Ella Mai; Noodles	Hernia surgery
March 24, 2017	Frankfurt	Germany	Gibson	Ella Mai; Noodles	Hernia surgery
March 26, 2017	Cologne	Germany	Essigfabrik	Ella Mai; Noodles	Hernia surgery
March 27, 2017	Hamburg	Germany	Uebel & Gefährlich	Ella Mai; Noodles	Hernia surgery

=== Notes ===
- A The shows on April 16 & 23, 2017 in Indio, United States, were part of the 2017 Coachella Valley Music and Arts Festival.
- B The show on June 2, 2017, in New York City, United States, was part of the 2017 Governors Ball Music Festival.
- C The show on July 23, 2017, in Los Angeles, United States, was part of the 2017 FYF Fest.
- D The shows on August 19 & 20, 2017 in Japan were part of the 2017 Summer Sonic Festival.
- E The show on October 27, 2017, in New Orleans, United States is part of the 2017 Voodoo Experience.
- F The show on October 29, 2017, in Los Angeles, United States, is part of the 2017 Camp Flog Gnaw Carnival.
- G The show on November 3, 2017, in Chicago, United States, is part of the 2017 30 Days in Chicago concerts presented by Red Bull Sound Select.
- H The show on November 12, 2017, in McDade, United States, is part of the 2017 Sound on Sound Fest
- I The show on November 18, 2017, in Mexico City, Mexico, is part of the 2017 Corona Capital festival.
