= Can I =

Can I may refer to:

- Can I, a 2010 album by Jaicko
- "Can I", a 2015 song by Drake featuring Beyoncé, from the compilation album Care Package
- "Can I", a 2020 song by Kehlani featuring Tory Lanez
