= As I Am (disambiguation) =

As I Am is a 2007 album by Alicia Keys.

As I Am may also refer to:

== Books ==
- As I Am: ABBA Before and Beyond, the 1996 autobiography of singer and ABBA member Agnetha Fältskog
- As I Am (1988), autobiography by American actress Patricia Neal

== Music ==
- As I Am Tour, Alicia Keys' world concert tour of 2008

=== Albums ===
- As I Am (Anne Murray album), 1988
- As I Am (Kristin Chenoweth album), 2005
- Som jag är (English: As I am), ABBA singer Agnetha Fältskog's Swedish-language solo album from 1970
- As I Am, a 2019 album by Julian Marley

=== Songs ===
- "As I Am" (song), by Justin Bieber, 2021
- "As I Am", a song by the Goo Goo Dolls from the album Something for the Rest of Us
- "As I Am", a song on Meet Miley Cyrus, the 2007 debut solo album by teen-aged actress/singer Miley Cyrus
- "As I Am", the opening track of the 2003 album Train of Thought by Dream Theater
- "As I Am", the last track of the 1996 album Quartet by the jazz group Pat Metheny Group
- "As I Am", a song by Kehlani from the 2014 mixtape Cloud 19
