= While We Wait =

Mixtape by Kehlani
- Released: February 22, 2019
- Genre: R&B
- Length: 31:19
- Labels: Atlantic; TSNMI
- Producers: Kehlani; Sir Nolan; DannyBoyStyles; The Rascals; SuperDuperBrick; J Young White; Young Fyre; Stan Greene; Hit-Boy; G-Dav; Teddy Walton; Oak Felder; Jahaan Sweet; Boi-1da; Big White; NOVA WAV; daedaePIVOT; letmode; Triangle Park; M-Phazes

Kehlani chronology
SweetSexySavage (2017)	While We Wait (2019)	It Was Good Until It Wasn't (2020)

Singles from While We Wait
- 1. "Nights Like This" Released: January 10, 2019; 2. "Butterfly" Released: February 12, 2019; 3. "Nunya" Released: February 19, 2019; 4. "RPG" Released: April 17, 2019

Professional ratings
Aggregate scores
Source	Rating
Metacritic	79/100
Review scores
Source	Rating
Spin	(positive)
Pitchfork	7.6/10

While We Wait is the second commercial and third mixtape by American singer Kehlani. The album was released on February 22, 2019, by Atlantic Records. While We Wait features guest appearances from Musiq Soulchild, Dom Kennedy, Ty Dolla $ign, and 6lack.

== Commercial performance ==
While We Wait opened at number nine on the US Billboard 200, earning 34,000 album-equivalent units, including 6,000 pure album sales in its first week. While We Wait is Kehlani's second US top 10 album.

== Singles ==
Kehlani released the first single "Nights Like This" featuring American singer Ty Dolla Sign on January 10, 2019. The music video was released on the same day.

== Track listing ==
Credits adapted from Tidal.

No.	Title	Writer(s)	Producer(s)	Length
1.	"Footsteps" (featuring Musiq Soulchild)	Kehlani Parrish; Justin Howze	SuperDuperBrick; J Young White	4:33
2.	"Too Deep"	Parrish; Nicholas James Williams; Tramaine Winfrey	Young Fyre; Stan Greene	2:47
3.	"Nunya" (featuring Dom Kennedy)	Parrish; Greg Allen Davis; Dominic Ross Hunn; Chauncey Hollis Jr; Travis Walton	Hit-Boy; G-Dav; Teddy Walton	4:05
4.	"Morning Glory"	Parrish; Warren Felder; Roy Hammond; William Zaire Simmons	Oak Felder	2:59
5.	"Feels"	Parrish; Matthew Jehu Samuels; Brittany Coney; Denisia Andrews; Jahaan Sweet; Andrew Joseph Gradwohl Jr.	Jahaan Sweet; Boi-1da; Big White; NOVA WAV	3:01
6.	"Nights Like This" (featuring Ty Dolla Sign)	Parrish; Tyrone Griffin Jr.; Brandon Hollemon; Danny Schofield; Nolan Lambroza	Sir Nolan; DannyBoyStyles	3:22
7.	"RPG" (featuring 6LACK)	Parrish; Ricardo Valdez Valentine; Cory Osborn Grindberg; Dylan Christopher Frank	daedaePIVOT; letmode	3:56
8.	"Butterfly"	Parrish; Leon Thomas III; Khristopher Riddick-Tynes; Aliandro Prawl; Amber Perkins; Scott Carter	The Rascals; Triangle Park	2:44
9.	"Love Language"	Parrish; Mark Landon; Howze	SuperDuperBrick; M-Phazes	3:52
Total length:				31:19

Japan bonus track
No.	Title	Length
10.	"Nights Like This" (featuring Ty Dolla Sign) (Snakehips & B. Lewis Remix)	3:10
Total length:		34:13

Sample credits

- "Footsteps" contains an interpolation of "Ice Box", as performed by Omarion.
- ”Morning Glory” samples “Impeach The President” by The Honeydrippers.

== Charts ==
Chart (2019)	Peak position
Australian Albums (ARIA)	29
Belgian Albums (Ultratop Flanders)	146
Canadian Albums (Billboard)	17
Dutch Albums (Album Top 100)	34
French Albums (SNEP)	200
Lithuanian Albums (AGATA)	34
New Zealand Albums (RMNZ)	17
UK Albums (Official Charts)	47
US Billboard 200	9

== Certifications ==
Certifications for While We Wait
Region	Certification	Certified units/sales
New Zealand (RMNZ)	Platinum	15,000^{‡}
United States (RIAA)	Gold	500,000^{‡}
^{‡} Sales+streaming figures based on certification alone.
