= You Should Be Here (mixtape) =

Mixtape by Kehlani
- Released: April 28, 2015
- Genre: R&B
- Length: 46:12
- Label: TSNMI
- Producer: Kehlani; A.C.; Billboard; Coucheron; The Featherstones; Geoffro Cause; Jahaan Sweet; JMIKE; Killagraham; MadMax; Taylor Gordon; Ted Digtl

Kehlani chronology
Cloud 19 (2014)	You Should Be Here (2015)	SweetSexySavage (2017)

Singles from You Should Be Here
- 1. "The Way" Released: July 27, 2015

You Should Be Here is the second and debut commercial mixtape by American singer and songwriter Kehlani. It was self-released through the iTunes Store on April 28, 2015. You Should Be Here features guest appearances from Lexii Alijai, Chance the Rapper, and BJ the Chicago Kid. It peaked at number 36 on the US Billboard 200. Mixed by Joe Fitzgerald, the mixtape predominantly features production by Jahaan Sweet, along with production from JMike, Madmax, Geoffro Cause and Ted Digtl, among others.

In July 2015, Kehlani embarked on a tour to promote the mixtape. The tour visited cities; including North America and Europe. Music videos were created for "You Should Be Here", "The Way", and "Alive". The mixtape received a nomination for Best Urban Contemporary Album at the 58th Annual Grammy Awards.

In April 2023, after receiving significant backlash for her mixed race identity over the song "Niggas", the song was removed from all streaming platforms and excluded from the tracklist.

== Critical reception ==
Professional ratings
Aggregate scores
Source	Rating
Metacritic	80/100
Review scores
Source	Rating
AllMusic	4/5 stars
Billboard	4/5 stars
Complex	4/5 stars
HipHopDX	4/5 stars
The New York Times	favorable
Pitchfork	7.4/10

At Metacritic, which assigns a weighted average score to reviews from mainstream critics, You Should Be Here received an average score of 80 based on 6 reviews, indicating "generally favorable reviews".

Matthew Ramirez of Pitchfork commented that "You Should Be Here's dynamism and generosity is something to be amazed by, especially considering Kehlani is all of 19 years old." Andy Kellman of AllMusic said: "While the singer and songwriter has fashioned [themself] into a contemporary R&B artist comparable to the likes of Jhené Aiko and Tinashe, [they] have retained the charming, down-to-earth qualities they displayed with their band." Elias Leight of Billboard described it as "an intense, focused exploration of all, or nearly all, the relationships the singer is involved in, both romantic and familial."

=== Accolades ===
Publication	Accolade	Rank	Ref.
Complex	Best Albums of 2015	12	
Noisey	50 Best Albums of 2015	16	
Rolling Stone	20 Best R&B Albums of 2015	16	

== Track listing ==
No.	Title	Writer(s)	Producer(s)	Length
1.	"Intro"	Kehlani Parrish; Guy Parrish	Kehlani	2:19
2.	"You Should Be Here"	Parrish; Alexander Castillo; Jeremy Coleman	JMIKE; A.C.; I.T.M.G	2:37
3.	"How That Taste"	Parrish; Jahaan Sweet	Jahaan Sweet	2:32
4.	"Jealous" (featuring Lexii Alijai)	Parrish; Alexis Alijai Lynch; Sweet	Sweet	3:38
5.	"Niggas"	PP; Sweet; Parrish	Jahaan Sweet	2:54
6.	"Wanted"	Parrish; Ricky Witherspoon, Jr.; Coleman; Graham Muron	JMIKE; MadMax; KillaGraham	2:10
7.	"The Way" (featuring Chance the Rapper)	Parrish; Sweet; Chancelor Bennett	Jahaan Sweet; Eryck Bry; KillaGraham	4:22
8.	"Unconditional"	Parrish; Taylor Gordon; Geoffrey P. Earley	Geoffro Cause; Taylor Gordon	2:36
9.	"The Letter"	Parrish; Joshua Blaxon	Ted Digtl	3:52
10.	"Runnin' (Interlude)"	Parrish; Sweet	Jahaan Sweet	2:17
11.	"Be Alright"	Parrish; Coleman; Mathieu Jomphe	JMIKE; Billboard	2:54
12.	"Down for You" (featuring BJ the Chicago Kid)	Parrish; Sweet; Bryan James Sledge	Jahaan Sweet	3:47
13.	"Yet"	Parrish; Christopher Featherstone; Justin Featherstone; William Featherstone; Matthew Featherstone	The Featherstones	2:29
14.	"Bright"	Parrish; Earley	Geoffro Cause	4:17
15.	"Alive" (featuring Coucheron)	Parrish; Sebastian Kornelius Gautier Teigen	Coucheron	3:07
Total length:				46:12

Sample credits

• "Down For You" interpolates "Just Friends (Sunny)" by Musiq Soulchild

== Charts ==
Chart performance for You Should Be Here
Chart (2015)	Peak position
US Billboard 200	36
US Top R&B/Hip-Hop Albums (Billboard)	5

== Certifications ==
Certifications for You Should Be Here
Region	Certification	Certified units/sales
United States (RIAA)	Gold	500,000^{‡}
^{‡} Sales+streaming figures based on certification alone.
