= SweetSexySavage =

Studio album by Kehlani
- Released: January 27, 2017
- Recorded: 2015–2016
- Studios: Atlantic Records (Los Angeles, California); Milkboy the Studio (Philadelphia, Pennsylvania)
- Genre: R&B
- Length: 58:29
- Labels: Atlantic; TSNMI
- Producers: Pop & Oak; Some Randoms; Autoro "Toro" Whitfield; Trevor Brown; Zaire Koalo; Jahaan Sweet; Rex Kudo; Sevn Thomas; Nick Seeley; Charlie Heat; Picard Brothers; The Featherstones; Novawav; Composer; P-Lo; JMIKE; Djemba Djemba

Kehlani chronology
You Should Be Here (2015)	SweetSexySavage (2017)	While We Wait (2019)

Singles from SweetSexySavage
- 1. "Crzy" Released: July 15, 2016; 2. "Distraction" Released: July 23, 2016; 3. "Gangsta" Released: August 1, 2016

SweetSexySavage is the debut studio album by American singer and songwriter Kehlani. The album was released on January 27, 2017, by Atlantic Records. Kehlani started work on the album shortly after the release of their mixtape You Should Be Here, with work proceeding into 2016. Kehlani described the album as having three elements; Sweet, Sexy and Savage, which are intended to be reflected in the album's lyrical content and production.

Kehlani was the lead writer on all tracks aside from "Intro", which was written by Reyna Biddy. Production on the project was handled by Pop & Oak, Jahaan Sweet, Charlie Heat, among others, who worked to incorporate a variety of different sounds on the album.

The album received mainly positive reviews from critics, generating a Metacritic score of 76, which ranks as Kehlani's third-highest score after their mixtape You Should Be Here from 2015, and before their mixtape While We Wait from 2019. It debuted at number three on the US Billboard 200, moving 58,000 album-equivalent units in its first tracking week. To promote the album, Kehlani embarked on the SweetSexySavage Tour.

== Background and production ==
After wrapping up the North American leg of the You Should Be Here Tour, new recording sessions for the album started in Philadelphia around Halloween 2015. The album was announced to be arriving "soon" in mid-2016 by Kehlani on Twitter. Work continued into 2016 where Kehlani finished and since has passed it onto their label.

The bulk of the album's production was handled by Pop & Oak, with Kehlani also working with many others, including their musical director and producer Jahaan Sweet, who they worked with on their mixtapes.

The album was inspired by TLC's album, CrazySexyCool. Kehlani also cited Natasha Bedingfield, Colbie Caillat, Gwen Stefani, and Pink as the biggest inspirations for the album. They stated that it was "more fun and aggressive" than their earlier work.

== Singles ==
"Crzy" was released as the lead single from SweetSexySavage on July 15, 2016, and peaked at number eighty-five on the US Billboard Hot 100. Kehlani performed the single on Jimmy Kimmel Live! to promote the album's release.

The second single, "Distraction", was released on July 23, 2016, and also peaked at number eighty-five on the Hot 100. The song impacted rhythmic radios in mid-January and has peaked in the top 40 of the rhythmic radio charts. Its accompanying music video received over 2 million views in one day on YouTube.

"Gangsta", which is featured in the DC film Suicide Squad was released on August 1, 2016, as the album's third single. "Gangsta" peaked at forty-one on the Hot 100, becoming Kehlani's highest charting song.

=== Promotional singles ===
The first promotional single from the album, "Advice", was premiered on Zane Lowe's Beats 1 show on December 1, 2016. Kehlani premiered the album's second promotional single "Undercover" on January 5, 2017, during Zane Lowe's Beats 1 show. "Do U Dirty" was released on January 12, 2017, as the album's third promotional single.

== Release and promotion ==
Kehlani promoted the album using the initials 'SSS' before finally announcing the album's title on November 27, 2016, via Twitter.

Kehlani revealed the album's cover on November 30, 2016. The album was made available to pre-order on iTunes on December 1, 2016, along with the promotional single "Advice". SweetSexySavage has 19 tracks on the deluxe version.

On January 27, Kehlani promoted the album's release by performing "CRZY" on Jimmy Kimmel Live!.

=== Tour ===
Kehlani announced that they would be going on a world tour in support of the album on December 2, 2016. Tickets went on sale on December 14, 2016, with concert dates in North America and Europe. The tour began on February 21, 2017, in Montreal, Quebec at Club Soda, and is scheduled to conclude on November 19, 2017, in Mexico City, Mexico at the Corona Capital Festival. A portion of the European leg was cancelled due to Kehlani having surgery on their stomach. The tour visited cities across North America, Europe, Oceania and Asia.

== Critical reception ==
Professional ratings
Aggregate scores
Source	Rating
AnyDecentMusic?	6.8/10
Metacritic	76/100
Review scores
Source	Rating
AllMusic	4.5/5 stars
The Daily Telegraph	4/5 stars
Entertainment Weekly	B
Exclaim!	8/10
Financial Times	4/5 stars
The Guardian	2/5 stars
NME	4/5 stars
The Observer	3/5 stars
Pitchfork	7.0/10
The Times	3/5 stars

At Metacritic, which assigns a weighted average score out of 100 to reviews from mainstream critics, the album received an average score of 76 out of 100 based on 17 reviews, indicating "generally favorable reviews".

Shahzaib Hussain of Clash gave the album a 7 out of 10 and said, "The production can at times become repetitive, yet it's Kehlani's versatility as a songstress that elevates the more cookie cutter numbers." Nick Levine of NME gave the album 4 stars out of 5 and commented that "the album is cohesive without feeling too samey."

Ryan B. Patrick of Exclaim! gave the album an 8 out of 10 and said, "by getting intensely personal, Kehlani adds a human side to the recordings that's multilayered and unapologetically self-determined." Andy Kellman of AllMusic gave the album 4.5 stars out of 5, commenting that "The lows and highs, grief and pleasure, and insecurity and pride are all put on vivid display, and Kehlani pours [themself] into all of it without overselling a thought."

Katherine St. Asaph of Pitchfork gave the album a 7.0 out of 10 and stated that "Refreshingly, SweetSexySavage is at its best when it's most exuberant, giddy in the face of haters and common sense alike." Barry Walters of Entertainment Weekly gave the album a grade of B, saying, "haunting highlights like 'Piece of Mind' and 'Everything Is Yours' prove that beneath SSS's padding, there's a succinct, sassy, and sincere album waiting to be slimmed down to Kehlani's own soul-searching essence."

=== Accolades ===
Publication	Accolade	Rank	Ref.
Billboard	25 Best & Worst Album Covers of 2017	Best	
Pitchfork	The 50 Best Albums of 2017	47	
Rolling Stone	20 Best R&B Albums of 2017	9	

== Commercial performance ==
SweetSexySavage debuted at number three on the US Billboard 200, moving 58,000 album-equivalent units with traditional album sales of 32,000 copies in its first week. This became Kehlani's first US top-ten debut on the chart. On June 29, 2018, the album was certified gold by the Recording Industry Association of America (RIAA) for combined sales and album-equivalent units of over 500,000 units in the United States.

== Track listing ==
No.	Title	Writer(s)	Producer(s)	Length
1.	"Intro"	Reyna Biddy		0:59
2.	"Keep On"	Kehlani Parrish; Jahaan Sweet; August Rigo; Ricky Tillo	Jahaan Sweet; Rigo	3:38
3.	"Distraction"	Parrish; Andrew "Pop" Wansel; Warren "Oak" Felder; Daniel Klein; Matthew Campfield	Pop & Oak; Some Randoms	3:55
4.	"Piece of Mind"	Parrish; Autoro Whitfield; Wansel; Felder	Pop & Oak; Toro; Some Randoms	4:18
5.	"Undercover"	Parrish; Aliaune Thiam; Jake Troth; Anthony Beale; Anthony Lawson; Bob Marley; Ernest Brown	Charlie Heat	3:03
6.	"Crzy"	Parrish; Denisia "Blu June" Andrews; Brittany "Chi" Coney	Novawav	3:11
7.	"Personal"	Parrish; Sweet; Johntá Austin; Bryan-Michael Cox; Kevin Hicks; Phalon Alexander	Jahaan Sweet	3:47
8.	"Not Used to It"	Parrish; Felder; Wansel; Campfield; Klein; Lotus Hartley; Rhian Sheehan	Pop & Oak; Some Randoms	3:55
9.	"Everything Is Yours"	Parrish; Wansel; Felder; Trevor Brown; Zaire Koalo	Pop & Oak; Koalo; Brown	3:31
10.	"Advice"	Parrish; Wansel; Felder; Campfield; Klein	Pop & Oak; Some Randoms	3:22
11.	"Do U Dirty"	Parrish; Christopher Featherstone; Justin Featherstone; Matthew Featherstone; William Featherstone	The Featherstones	3:26
12.	"Escape"	Parrish; Whitfield; Wansel; Felder; Brown; Koalo	Pop & Oak; Koalo; Brown; Toro	3:21
13.	"Too Much"	Parrish; Maxime Picard; Clement Picard; Stephen Garrett; Timothy Mosley	Picard Brothers	3:49
14.	"Get Like"	Parrish; Matthew Jehu Samuels; Rupert Thomas; Masamune Kudo; Nick Seeley	Sevn Thomas; Rex Kudo	2:54
15.	"In My Feelings"	Parrish; Wansel; Felder; Koalo; James Harris; Terry Lewis	Pop & Oak; Koalo	3:46
16.	"Hold Me by the Heart"	Parrish; Whitfield; Wansel; Felder	Pop & Oak; Toro	3:45
17.	"Thank You"	Parrish; Whitfield; Wansel; Felder; Klein; Campfield	Pop & Oak; Some Randoms; Toro	3:49
Total length:				58:28

Deluxe edition
No.	Title	Writer(s)	Producer(s)	Length
18.	"I Wanna Be"	Parrish; Anthony Kelly; Brittany Hazzard; Bryan Nelson; Ester Dean; Karen Chin; Paulo Rodriguez	Composer; P-Lo; Swagg R'Celious^{[c]}	3:31
19.	"Gangsta"	Parrish; Skylar Grey; Andrew Swanson; Jeremy Coleman; Jason Evigan; Jacob Luttrell	JMIKE; Djemba Djemba	2:57
Total length:				64:56

Japanese edition
No.	Title	Writer(s)	Producer(s)	Length
20.	"Did I"	Parrish; Whitfield; Wansel; Felder; Leslie Feist	Pop & Oak; Toro	3:36
21.	"Crzy" (featuring A Boogie wit da Hoodie) (Remix)	Parrish; Andrews; Coney; Artist J. Dubose	Novawav	3:13
Total length:				71:45

Notes

- "Piece of Mind" features vocals from Little Simz.
- ^{^[a]} signifies an additional producer
- ^{^[b]} signifies a co-producer
- ^{^[c]} signifies a vocal producer

Sample credits

- "Undercover" contains an interpolation of "Don't Matter", as performed by Akon.
- "Personal" contains a vocal sample from "Come Over", as performed by Aaliyah and Tank.
- "Not Used to It" contains an interpolation of "Waiting" by Rhian Sheehan featuring Lotus Harley.
- "Too Much" contains an interpolation of "More Than a Woman", as performed by Aaliyah.
- "In My Feelings" contains a sample of "If It Isn't Love", as performed by New Edition

== Charts ==
=== Weekly charts ===
Chart (2017)	Peak position
Australian Albums (ARIA)	32
Belgian Albums (Ultratop Flanders)	61
Belgian Albums (Ultratop Wallonia)	165
Canadian Albums (Billboard)	3
Dutch Albums (Album Top 100)	28
French Albums (SNEP)	127
Irish Albums (IRMA)	45
New Zealand Albums (RMNZ)	18
Norwegian Albums (VG-lista)	40
Swiss Albums (Schweizer Hitparade)	63
UK Albums (Official Charts)	26
UK R&B Albums (Official Charts)	5
US Billboard 200	3
US Top R&B/Hip-Hop Albums (Billboard)	2

=== Year-end charts ===
Chart (2017)	Position
US Billboard 200	144
US Top R&B/Hip-Hop Albums (Billboard)	56

== Certifications ==
Certifications for SweetSexySavage
Region	Certification	Certified units/sales
New Zealand (RMNZ)	Platinum	15,000^{‡}
United Kingdom (BPI)	Silver	60,000^{‡}
United States (RIAA)	Gold	500,000^{‡}
^{‡} Sales+streaming figures based on certification alone.

== Release history ==
Region	Date	Format	Label	Ref.
Various	January 27, 2017	CD; LP; Streaming; digital download	Atlantic	
Japan	March 1, 2017	CD	Warner Music Japan	
