= Lexii Alijai =

American rapper (1998–2020)

Background information
- Born: Alexis Alijai Lynch; February 19, 1998; Saint Paul, Minnesota, U.S.
- Died: January 1, 2020 (aged 21) Minneapolis, Minnesota, U.S.
- Genres: Hip-hop; R&B
- Occupations: Rapper; singer; songwriter
- Instrument: Vocals
- Years active: 2013–2020

Alexis Alijai Lynch (February 19, 1998 – January 1, 2020), better known by her stage name Lexii Alijai, was an American rapper, singer, and songwriter. Born and raised in Saint Paul, Minnesota, Alijai was part of the Twin Cities hip-hop scene. She released Growing Pains—her only full-length, studio album—in 2017. Alijai was a rising star in the local music scene when she died in Minneapolis in 2020.

== Early life and education ==
Lexii Alijai was born and raised in Saint Paul, Minnesota. She was the granddaughter of musician Roger Troutman, founder of funk band Zapp. Her father, Roger Lynch, the son of Roger Troutman, was also a musician. She attended Como Park Senior High School in Saint Paul, following an interest in basketball, but then focused on music instead and transferred to Creative Arts Secondary School, before then enrolling in an online school. Alijai ultimately dropped out to pursue a full-time music career and began rapping over the beats of popular songs by artists such as Dej Loaf, 2Pac and Drake.

== Career ==
Alijai released her first mixtape, Super Sweet 16s, in 2014 on her sixteenth birthday. She then collaborated with Rocky Diamonds on an extended play, titled 3 Days. A second mixtape, In the Meantime, was released a few months later, then her third, Feel∙Less, in October that same year.

In 2015, she and rapper Shaun Sloan collaborated on a mixtape titled Same Struggle. Different Story. Alijai became close friends with Kehlani the summer before the release of Kehlani's debut commercial mixtape, You Should Be Here (2015), which peaked at No. 36 on the Billboard 200. Her featured appearance on the track "Jealous" granted Alijai media attention due to her lyricism and flow presented on the track. Her next full-length project, Joseph's Coat, was released late 2015 and features 11 songs and contributions from Elle Varner.

In 2016, she performed at Soundset Music Festival and had opened up for Playboi Carti, Lil Uzi Vert, and Rich the Kid. She released a remix of "Exchange" by Bryson Tiller and "Cold Hearted" by Meek Mill along with a music video for her remix of "Cold Hearted". In 2017, she released a remix of "Redbone" by Childish Gambino and "Me, Myself and I" by Beyoncé.

On September 8, 2017, Alijai released her first full-length debut studio album, Growing Pains, in which she covered topics such as dropping out of school and maintaining a relationship with her ex-boyfriend's mother.

== Death ==
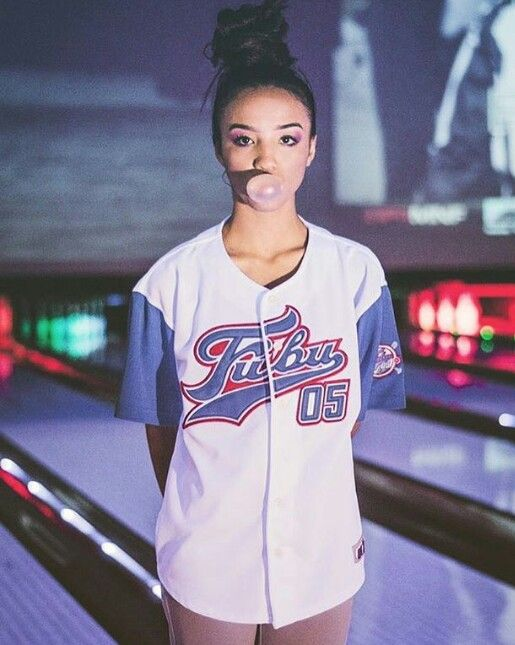
Alijai shortly before her death.

Alijai died at the Loews Minneapolis Hotel on January 1, 2020, at the age of 21. The Hennepin County Medical Examiner ruled that the manner of death was an accidental drug overdose. A toxicology report revealed the cause as mixed toxicity from fentanyl and ethanol.

== Discography ==
Studio albums

- Growing Pains (2017)

Mixtapes

- Super Sweet 16s (2014)
- In the Meantime (2014)
- Feel∙Less (2014)
- Joseph's Coat (2015)

Guest appearances

- Kehlani – "Jealous" from You Should Be Here (2015) by Kehlani
- Kehlani – "Lexii’s Outro" from It Was Good Until It Wasn't (2020) by Kehlani

EP's

- Come Back Soon (2021)
