= Marteen (American singer) =

American singer (born 2001)

- Born: Marteen Estevez; April 6, 2001 (age 25); Berkeley, California, U.S.
- Genres: R&B, pop
- Occupations: Singer, songwriter
- Labels: Warner Bros., Lyon Estates, Empire Distribution
- Website: marteen.com

Marteen Estevez (born April 6, 2001), known mononymously as Marteen, is an American singer and songwriter. He has opened for acts such as Kehlani, Fifth Harmony, Dua Lipa and NCT 127. Record producer J. R. Rotem discovered Marteen and has produced many of his songs.

== Early life ==
Marteen was born in Berkeley, California to a Mexican family. He and his family lived in Alameda and El Cerrito in the Bay Area prior to relocating to Burbank near Los Angeles. Marteen taught himself how to play the piano and guitar at age 12 with instructional videos off YouTube.

== Career ==
Marteen began his career by posting covers of pop songs to his Instagram account at age 12. A few months after he started posting those videos, he began to receive messages from record labels. In December 2014, at age 13, Marteen was featured on a track entitled "What It's All About" by his older cousin, Kehlani. Record producer J. R. Rotem began working with Marteen a year later.

In 2016, Marteen opened for Fifth Harmony, Bryson Tiller, and Kehlani prior to releasing his first independent mixtape, Focused, in August of that year. In May 2017, Marteen appeared on select dates as an opener for Kehlani on her SweetSexySavage World Tour. In July, Marteen was signed to Warner Bros. Records in association with J. R. Rotem's Lyon Estates record label. His debut single on Warner Bros. Records, Sriracha, was released the following month with an accompanying music video that was shot in West Oakland. In October 2017, Marteen announced an upcoming EP and an opening slot on Dua Lipa's Fall 2017 tour.

Prior to embarking on the Dua Lipa tour in November, Marteen released two songs, "Two Days" and "We Cool". He also announced upcoming dates with Kehlani on her "A Tsnmi Christmas" tour and at the Red Bull Sound Select Presents: 30 Days in Chicago event.

Marteen released his major label debut EP titled NOTHANKYOU. on February 23, 2018.

On November 8, 2019, he released his second mixtape 8.

In 2022, he appeared in a small supporting role in the horror film Halloween Ends.

== Discography ==
=== Extended plays ===
Title	Details
NOTHANKYOU.	Released: February 23, 2018; Label: Warner Bros.; Formats: CD, LP, digital download

=== Mixtapes ===
List of mixtapes with selected album details
Title	Details
Focused	Released: August 2016 (US); Label: Self-released; Format: Digital download
8	Released: November 8, 2019; Label: New Mogul Records, Empire Distribution; Format: Digital download

=== Singles ===
Title	Year	Album
"I Wanna"	2015	
"Head Up"	2016	
"OMW (On My Wave)"	2016	
"Pull Up"	2016	
"Funny"	2016	Focused
"Try"	2016	Focused
"Draymond"	2016	Focused
"Woke" (featuring YMTK)	2016	
"Sriracha"	2017	NOTHANKYOU.
"Two Days"	2017	NOTHANKYOU.
"We Cool"	2017	NOTHANKYOU.
"Left to Right"		NOTHANKYOU.
"Never Be Stopped" (featuring Rexx Life Raj)	2018	NOTHANKYOU.

=== Collaborations ===
Title	Artist	Year	Album
"What We Talkin' Bout"	NCT 127	2018	"Up Next Session: NCT 127"

== Filmography ==
Year	Title	Role	Notes
2022	Halloween Ends	Billy	
2024	Freaky Tales	Kohlrabi	
