= It Was Good Until It Wasn't =

Studio album by Kehlani
- Released: May 8, 2020
- Genre: R&B
- Length: 39:30
- Label: Atlantic
- Producers: Boi-1da; Cyht; Yussef Dayes; Dan Foster; Go Grizzly; G. Ry; Jake One; KBeazy; Louie Lastic; Loshendrix; Mars; Mike & Keys; Pooh Beatz; Pop & Oak; Pop Wansel; Roget; Sam Wish; Smplgtwy; Some Randoms; Jahaan Sweet; The Orphanage; The Rascals; Vianey; YogiTheProducer

Kehlani chronology
While We Wait (2019)	It Was Good Until It Wasn't (2020)	Blue Water Road (2022)

Singles from It Was Good Until It Wasn't
- 1. "Toxic" Released: March 11, 2020; 2. "Everybody Business" Released: April 15, 2020; 3. "F&MU" Released: April 30, 2020; 4. "Can I" Released: June 3, 2020

It Was Good Until It Wasn't is the second studio album by American singer and songwriter Kehlani. It was released on May 8, 2020, by Atlantic Records. It features guest appearances from Tory Lanez (removed later), Jhené Aiko, Masego, Lucky Daye, James Blake and Megan Thee Stallion, as well as uncredited vocals by Ty Dolla Sign.

Three promotional singles preceded the album's release. "Toxic", "Everybody Business", and "F&MU" were made available on March 12, April 16, and April 30, 2020, respectively. The official lead single "Can I" was released on June 3, 2020. Several of the album's tracks had accompanying music videos that were shot at the singer's home due to the coronavirus pandemic. The album debuted at number two on the US Billboard 200 chart.

== Background ==
On their 25th birthday, Kehlani announced the title and release date of their second studio album. They subsequently shared the album's artwork throughout social media, which finds them peeking over a wall in their garden while holding a water hose. Shortly prior to this, Kehlani signed a worldwide publishing deal with Pulse Music Group which includes their entire music catalog in addition to future works with Pulse's Vice President of A&R citing that, "[Their] talent both as an artist and songwriter is undeniable and seeing [their] career skyrocket in such a short time is incredibly impressive. We can't wait to get to work and to be a part of [their] team in this next stage of [their] career".

In early 2020, Kehlani had a guest appearance on Justin Bieber's fifth studio album Changes on the song "Get Me". They also featured on Megan Thee Stallion's third extended play, Suga. After much anticipation, Kehlani took to their Twitter to announce their "new album is done" and called it their "best work yet". In addition to the album's release, Kehlani also released a handful of singles, including a collaboration featuring singer Keyshia Cole titled "All Me". A duet with rapper YG, who Kehlani also had a relationship with upon the release of the single, titled "Konclusions" was released on Valentine's Day 2020 along with a music video. Just three days after their collaboration, the singer responded with a song titled "Valentine's Day (Shameful)" on which they confirmed their break up. The song was released on SoundCloud and was released on additional streaming services later on. “You Know Wassup”, which was released in November 2019, detailed some of the struggles during their relationship with YG as well.

In 2020, Kehlani revealed that Canadian pop-rapper Drake helped her with the album title for It Was Good Until It Wasn’t.

== Marketing and sales ==
On March 12, 2020, Kehlani released "Toxic", the first promotional single of the project. The song addresses the fraught aspects of a toxic relationship. The song peaked at number 68 on the Billboard Hot 100. The album's second promotional single, "Everybody Business" was released on April 16. "F&MU" was released on April 30 along with the album's pre-order as the project's third promotional single. All of the songs were accompanied by "Quarantine Style" visuals and music videos.

The album was released on May 8, 2020, by Atlantic Records. The album was made available for pre-order on April 30 alongside the song "F&MU". Kehlani was set to embark on the Changes Tour alongside Justin Bieber. The tour was set to begin on May 14 but was postponed due to the effects of the coronavirus pandemic.

In its first week of release, It Was Good Until It Wasn't debuted at number two on the US Billboard 200 chart, based on 83,000 album-equivalent units earned (including 25,000 copies of pure album sales). This became Kehlani's second album to reach the US top five. The album also accumulated a total of 74.68 million on-demand streams of the album's songs during the tracking week.

On June 3, 2020, "Can I" was released as the album's first official single. The songs "Open (Passionate)" and "Bad News" received music videos on May 8 and July 9, respectively.

== Critical reception ==
Professional ratings
Aggregate scores
Source	Rating
AnyDecentMusic?	7.3/10
Metacritic	77/100
Review scores
Source	Rating
AllMusic	4/5 stars
And It Don't Stop	A−
Clash	9/10
Exclaim!	6/10
The Guardian	4/5 stars
HipHopDX	3.8/5
The Independent	4/5 stars
The Line of Best Fit	9/10
NME	3/5 stars
Pitchfork	7.7/10

It Was Good Until It Wasn't was met with generally positive reviews. At Metacritic, which assigns a normalized rating out of 100 to reviews from professional publications, the album received an average score of 77, based on 13 reviews. Aggregator AnyDecentMusic? gave it 7.3 out of 10, based on their assessment of the critical consensus, while Album of the Year assessed the critical consensus as a 72 out of 100, based on 13 reviews.

Shakeena Johnson of Clash wrote that "The album's arrangement of serenading beats and jazzy undertones has genuinely proven that Kehlani is a force to be reckoned with." Johnson also called the album Kehlani's "best project to date." The Guardian's reviewer Alexis Petridis opined that "It Was Good Until It Wasn't is an album so concise and focused that songs regularly clock in just a shade over two minutes, and which offers a succession of 21st-century reboots of the old-fashioned R&B slow jam." While Petridis noted that "everything proceeds at pretty much the same pace – languorous crawl to the bedroom", he praised the album for its variety and for not sounding monotonous. Writing for The Independent, Roisin O'Connor stated that the album's "15 tracks waft in as though carried by a summer breeze; Kehlani's crystalline vocals shine through arrangements of sedate beats, jazz piano motifs, and luxurious twangs of Spanish guitar." O'Connor further noted that Kehlani demonstrates their "profound emotional intelligence" on the album and he also praised the features on the record. Pitchfork's reviewer Stephen Kearse noted the album's production as more moody than previous releases by Kehlani, writing that it replaces "the sunny, poppy swells of SweetSexySavage with cloudy grooves that rock and sway rather than ascend and drop." Kearse called the record a bit diffuse at times, referring to the lack of distinct characters in Kehlani's storytelling. However, he praised them for showcasing their development as an artist, stating that they're "becoming an increasingly agile performer, rapping, singing, and everything in between."

Some reviews were more mixed. Hannah Mylrea of NME stated that the problem with the record is that "it loses sight of the sheer brilliance Kehlani has demonstrated on previous releases. The dark and sexy new songs shine their brightest when coated with a layer of [their] previous sparkle; which makes the artist's second album a fine but frustrating release." Ben Devlin of musicOMH stated that the album contains some filler songs, while noting the tracks "Can I" and "Lexii's Outro" as highlights. Devlin also directed praise towards Kehlani's songwriting and vocal performances. Exclaim!'s reviewer Veracia Ankrah opined that the album's drawback is the lack of cohesiveness within its storytelling. However, Ankrah noted the songs "Bad News", "Everybody Business" and "Open (Passionate)" as highlights on the record, stating that those tracks are "showcasing elements of Kehlani's strongest contributions to music thus far, and highlighting [their] ability to make vulnerability a strength."

Reviewing in his "Consumer Guide" column, Robert Christgau appreciated how Kehlani "conceives sex almost exclusively as pleasure rather than power, and as eros too—that is, love, which can hurt plenty emotionally but in physical form generally feels good", as well as the presence of clothes as a thematic device in the songs' narratives. In conclusion, he wrote, "I can't think of another album that more vividly respects and evokes not just the physical sensations of sexual love, which is rare enough, but the emotions those sensations entail and intensify in a woman who’d 'rather argue than sleep alone.'"

=== Rankings ===
Critics' rankings for It Was Good Until It Wasn't
Publication	Accolade	Rank	Ref.
Billboard	50 Best Albums of 2020	32	
Esquire	50 Best Albums of 2020	37	
Gay Times	20 Best Albums of 2020 by LGBTQ+ Artists	—N/a	
Gulf News	32 Biggest Albums of 2020	25	
HipHopDX	Best R&B Albums of 2020	—N/a	
Hypebeast	Best Albums of 2020	—N/a	
Insider Inc.	35 Best Albums of 2020 by Female Artists	—N/a	
Nylon	Top Albums of 2020	—N/a	
Okayplayer	Best Albums of 2020	11	
PopSugar	50 Best Albums of 2020	39	
Seventeen	Best Albums of 2020	6	
Spin	30 Best Albums of 2020 – Mid-Year	—N/a	
Stereogum	50 Best Albums of 2020	48	
The Guardian	Best Albums of 2020 by Michael Cragg	—N/a	
Yardbarker	20 Best R&B Albums of 2020	11	

== Track listing ==
It Was Good Until It Wasn't
No.	Title	Writer(s)	Producer(s)	Length
1.	"Toxic"	Kehlani Parrish; Ryan Martinez; Keegan Bach	G. Ry; KBeazy; Elijah Blake^{[v]}	2:48
2.	"Can I" (featuring Tory Lanez)	Parrish; Andrew Wansel; Jacob Dutton; Daniel Klein; Matt Campfield; Daystar Peterson; Phalon Alexander; Kevin Hicks; Bryan-Michael Cox; Johntá Austin	Pop Wansel; Jake One; Some Randoms; Ambré^{[v]}	3:00
3.	"Bad News"	Parrish; Jahaan Sweet	Sweet	3:06
4.	"Real Hot Girl Skit" (performed by Megan Thee Stallion)	Megan Pete		0:16
5.	"Water"	Parrish; India Perkins; Destin Conrad; Alex Ben-Abdallah; Dan Foster; Louise Lastic	Lastic; Foster; Blake^{[v]}; Ambré^{[v]}	2:03
6.	"Change Your Life" (featuring Jhené Aiko)	Parrish; Wansel; Warren Felder; Alex Niceforo; Keith Sorrells; Aiko	Pop & Oak; The Orphanage; Ten4^{[c]}	3:11
7.	"Belong to the Streets Skit" (performed by Gibran Garcia, Anthony Creer, Serak Mehari, Albert Watts, and Jassmyn Fowlkes)	Gibran Garcia; Anthony Creer; Serak Mehari; Albert Watts; Jassmyn Fowlkes		0:27
8.	"Everybody Business"	Parrish; Kevin Price; Carlos Muñoz; Trinidad James; Conrad; Shawn Carter; Pharrell Williams; Chad Hugo	Go Grizzly; Loshendrix	2:25
9.	"Hate the Club" (featuring Masego)	Sweet; Yussef Dayes; Parrish; Micah Davis	Sweet; Dayes; Blake^{[v]}	4:39
10.	"Serial Lover"	Parrish; Sweet; Matthew Samuels; Johann Deterville; Michael Samuels; Vianey Emmanuël Mfuamba	Boi-1da; Sweet; YogiTheProducer; Smplgtwy; Vianey; Blake^{[v]}; Ambré^{[v]}	2:26
11.	"F&MU"	Parrish; Nija Charles; Sweet; Paolo Rodriguez	Sweet; TeeFlii^{[v]}	2:15
12.	"Can You Blame Me" (featuring Lucky Daye)	Parrish; Wansel; Samuel Wishkoski; Klein; Campfield; Charles; David Brown; Dustin Bowie; Michael MacGregor	Wansel; Some Randoms; Sam Wish	3:03
13.	"Grieving" (featuring James Blake)	Parrish; James Blake; Ma. Samuels; Deterville	Boi-1da; Sweet; The Rascals; YogiTheProducer	3:51
14.	"Open (Passionate)"	Parrish; Charles; Muñoz; Wansel; Conrad; Lamar Edwards; Michael Cox, Jr.; John Groover; Rogét Chahayed; Darryl Clemons	Mars; Mike & Keys; Roget; Pooh Beatz; Loshendrix	4:06
15.	"Lexii's Outro"	Alexis Lynch; Cameron Goins; Josh Timmerman	Cyht	1:44
Total length:				39:40

Notes

- ^{^[c]} signifies a co-producer.
- ^{^[v]} signifies a vocal producer.
- "Can I" contains an interpolation of "Come Over", written by Phalon Alexander, Kevin Hicks, Bryan-Michael Cox, and Johntá Austin, and performed by Aaliyah.
- "Everybody Business" contains an interpolation of "Frontin'”, written by Chad Hugo, Shawn Carter, and Pharrell Williams, and performed by Williams featuring Jay-Z.
- On later digital versions of the album, Tory Lanez's verse in "Can I" is absent. In place of it, Kehlani sings another verse. Physical versions, however, retain Tory's verse.

== Personnel ==
- Kehlani – vocals
- Chris Athens – mastering
- Jaycen Joshua – mixing
- Antonio Tucci Jr. – engineering (tracks 1–3, 5, 6, 8)
- Marcus Anthony Garcia – engineering (track 1)
- Jaramiah Rios – engineering (track 8)
- Danny Garcia – engineering (track 9)
- Itai Schwartz – engineering (track 14)
- Jacob Richards – mixing assistance
- Mike Seaberg – mixing assistance
- DJ Riggins – mixing assistance
- Ty Dolla Sign – background vocals (track 1)
- Steven "Stix" Maciejewski – creative direction
- Ryan Flanagan – project management

== Charts ==
=== Weekly charts ===
Chart performance for It Was Good Until It Wasn't
Chart (2020)	Peak position
Australian Albums (ARIA)	17
Belgian Albums (Ultratop Flanders)	38
Belgian Albums (Ultratop Wallonia)	117
Canadian Albums (Billboard)	4
Dutch Albums (Album Top 100)	28
French Albums (SNEP)	78
Irish Albums (IRMA)	66
New Zealand Albums (RMNZ)	6
Swiss Albums (Schweizer Hitparade)	51
UK Albums (Official Charts)	10
US Billboard 200	2
US Top R&B/Hip-Hop Albums (Billboard)	1

=== Year-end charts ===
2020 year-end chart performance for It Was Good Until It Wasn't
Chart (2020)	Position
US Billboard 200	148
US Top R&B/Hip-Hop Albums (Billboard)	65

== Certifications ==
Certifications for It Was Good Until It Wasn't
Region	Certification	Certified units/sales
New Zealand (RMNZ)	Gold	7,500^{‡}
United Kingdom (BPI)	Silver	60,000^{‡}
^{‡} Sales+streaming figures based on certification alone.
