= Jahkoy Palmer =

Canadian R&B singer and rapper (born 1994)

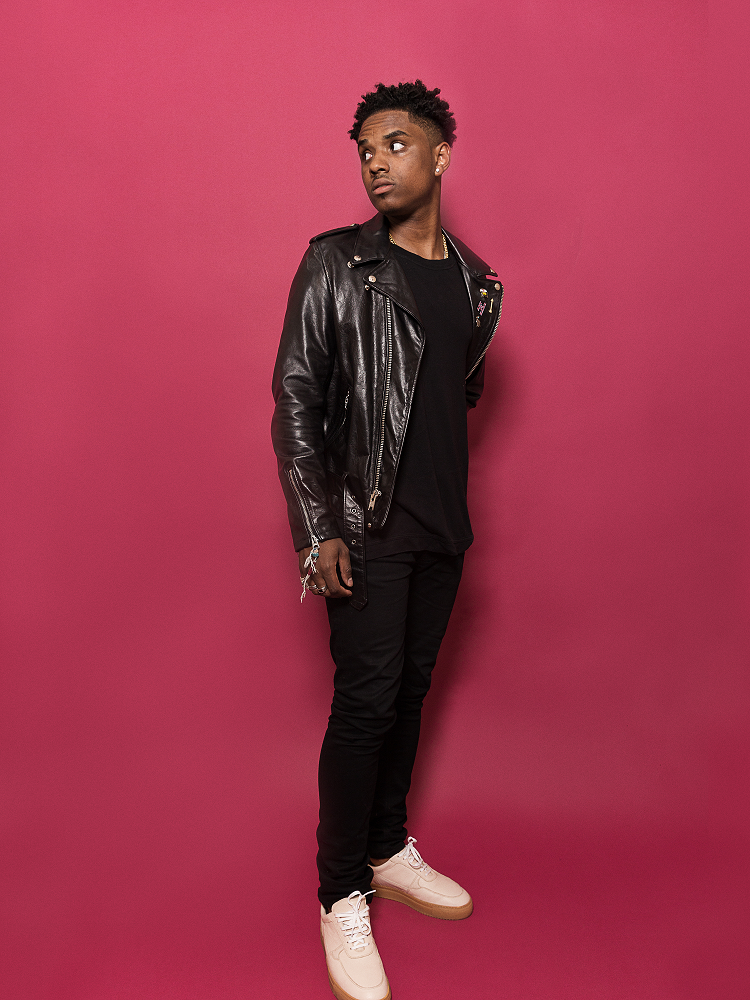

Background information
- Born: March 23, 1994 (age 32); Toronto, Ontario, Canada
- Genres: R&B; hip hop
- Occupations: Singer; rapper; record producer
- Instrument: Vocals
- Years active: 2014–present
- Label: Def Jam

Jahkoy Palmer (born March 23, 1994) (known as Jahkoy or JAHKOY) is a Canadian R&B singer and rapper. He has released several projects, including the mixtape Forward Thinking, and the singles "Still in Love", "Hold Your Hand", and "Odd Future". His most recent single, "Odd Future," premiered on Zane Lowe's Beats 1 radio show in January 2016 and was played by Drake on OVO Sound Radio.

== Early life ==
Palmer was born in Toronto, Ontario, Canada, to a Jamaican mother and an Ethiopian father. Growing up, he lived in both the Lawrence Heights and Jane and Finch neighborhoods in Toronto. To keep him out of trouble, his parents transferred him to Our Lady of the Assumption Catholic school. As young as age 11, he began writing poetry and turning those poems into raps. He began recording and rapping under the name Raheem by age 14. Palmer counts Pharrell and Andre 3000 among his early influences.

== Career ==
Under the alias Raheem, Palmer performed at numerous events throughout Toronto, including the Manifesto Arts Festival and the 106 and York Urban Arts Festival, before he turned 16. By age 19, he decided to return to his birth name, Jahkoy, for his music career. He released his first mixtape under the name JAHKOY in December 2013. The album, Forward Thinking, introduced what Jahkoy refers to as a "bipolar" sound, and also marked a shift from predominantly rapping to predominantly singing.

JAHKOY has collaborated with Willow and Jaden Smith. In 2015, he released singles including "Still in Love," "Hold Your Hand," and "All The Things You Do." "Still in Love" and "Hold Your Hand" were often in regular rotation on Zane Lowe, Drake, Elton John, and Pharrell's Beats 1 radio stations.

In early 2016, Jahkoy was signed to Def Jam Recordings. He released his first single under the Def Jam banner in January 2016. The song, "Odd Future," was premiered on Zane Lowe's Beats 1 radio station and was played by Drake and OVO Sound Radio.

Throughout 2017, Jahkoy and Ella Mai opened for Kehlani on her SweetSexySavage World Tour.

== Personal life ==
Palmer confirmed his relationship with Australian fitness model and influencer Tammy Hembrow on Instagram in June 2019. Hembrow and Palmer dated for a few months in 2019 and broke up.

== Discography ==
=== Mixtapes ===
Dying To Live Forever (2014)

Title	Details
Forward Thinking	Released: 2015 (US); Label: Self-released; Formats: Digital download

=== EPs ===
Title	Details
Foreign Water	Released: 2017; Label: Def Jam; Formats: Digital download, streaming

=== Singles ===
Title	Year	Album
"Still in Love"	2015	Non-album single
"Hold Your Hand"	2015	Non-album single
"Odd Future"	2016	Foreign Water
"California Heaven" (featuring Schoolboy Q)	2016	Foreign Water
"All This"	2018	TBA
