= Taylor Gordon =

Canadian boxing coach

- Born: Taylor Lewis Gordon; Melfort, Saskatchewan
- Died: May 31, 2016; Halifax, Nova Scotia
- Nationality: (Canada) Canadian
- Occupation: Boxing coach

Taylor Gordon (d. May 31, 2016) was a Canadian boxer, Olympic boxing coach, and trainer. He was a prominent figure in Canadian amateur boxing.

== Early life ==
Taylor Lewis Gordon was born in Melfort, Saskatchewan. In the mid-1940s, he joined the Royal Canadian Navy, where he served for 25 years.

== Amateur boxing career ==
Representing the Melfort Boxing Club, he took part in an amateur boxing event in Regina, Saskatchewan, in February 1950. That year, he won the 1950 Canadian Forces title in the lightweight division. Gordon held an amateur record of 101 wins in 111 bouts.

== Coaching career ==
He was coach of the Coverdale Boxing Club in New Brunswick during 1967.

Gordon was appointed as the Canadian Olympic boxing team's coach for the 1968 Olympics. After being relocated to Nova Scotia with the Navy in the early 1970s, he opted to stay and founded the Citadel Amateur Boxing Club in 1972.

By 1974, he was serving as the Canadian Amateur Boxing Association's Atlantic Region technical coordinator.

After meeting Trevor Berbick at the 1975 Pan American Games in Mexico, Gordon began training him as an amateur. He supported Berbick during his participation in the 1976 Summer Olympics.

Gordon was named the coach of the Canadian amateur boxing team in November 1979, which competed at the AIBA World Junior Boxing Championships in Yokohama, Japan.

He was selected as Canada's Olympic boxing team coach for four consecutive Olympics: 1980 in Moscow (which Canada boycotted), 1984 in Los Angeles, 1988 in Seoul, and 1992 in Barcelona. He resigned as the head coach after the 1992 Summer Olympics and served as an assistant coach in the 1996 Olympics and 2000 Olympics.

While with the Canadian national team, he also attended the 1982 Commonwealth Games and the 1987 Pan American Games. He oversaw amateur medalists including Ray Downey, Willie deWit, Shawn O'Sullivan, and Lennox Lewis.

== Personal life ==
Wayne Gordon, a former Canadian welterweight boxer, is his son.

== Death ==
Taylor Gordon died at age 84 on May 31, 2016.

== Honors and awards ==
- 1950 Canadian Forces Lightweight Champion
- 1996 Nova Scotia Sport Hall of Fame inductee
- 2000 Boxing Canada Hall of Fame inductee
- 5-time Olympic boxing coach
