= Suicide Squad (soundtrack) =

2016 soundtrack of the film Suicide Squad

Suicide Squad: The Album
- Standard cover

Soundtrack album by Various artists
- Released: August 5, 2016
- Recorded: 2016
- Studios: Atlantic Studios (Los Angeles, California); Abbey Road (London)
- Genres: Alternative pop; hip hop; rock; indie rock
- Length: 50:31
- Labels: WaterTower; Atlantic; Warner Bros.
- Producers: Alex da Kid; Beat Billionaire; Butch Walker; Claire Boucher; Djemba Djemba; DJ Head; Eminem; Erik Jacobsen; Grimes; Kyle Biane; Jason Evigan; Jeff Bass; Jerry Goldstein; JMIKE; John Fogerty; John Samuel Hanson; Mark Ronson; Mike Elizondo; Parker Ighile; Quincy Jones; Rick Hall; Rick James; Skrillex; T-Collar; Tyler Joseph

Singles from Suicide Squad: The Album
- 1. "Heathens" Released: June 16, 2016; 2. "Sucker for Pain" Released: June 24, 2016; 3. "Purple Lamborghini" Released: July 22, 2016; 4. "Gangsta" Released: August 1, 2016

Professional ratings
Review scores
Source	Rating
AllMusic	2.5/5 stars
Entertainment Weekly	B
Pitchfork	4.0/10

Suicide Squad: The Album is the soundtrack album to the film of the same name. It was released on August 5, 2016, by Atlantic Records and WaterTower Music. A separate film score album, titled Suicide Squad: Original Motion Picture Score and composed by Steven Price, was released on August 8, by WaterTower Music. The digital edition of the film score album contains eight bonus tracks. It received mixed reviews by critics, but the Collector's Edition received a Grammy Award nomination for Best Compilation Soundtrack for Visual Media at the 2017 ceremony. It won the 2017 Kids' Choice Awards for Favorite Soundtrack.

== Commercial performance ==
In the United States, the soundtrack debuted at number one on the Billboard 200, with 182,000 equivalent album units. It was also the best-selling album of the week, selling 128,000 copies in its first week on the chart.

Suicide Squad was certified gold in the United States on September 23, 2016, for 500,000 units composed by sales, streaming and track-equivalent units. It was certified platinum for shipping over 1 million equivalent-units on November 16. As of April 2017, it has sold 548,000 copies in the country.

== Track listing ==
Suicide Squad: The Album track listing
No.	Title	Writer(s)	Producer(s)	Length
1.	"Purple Lamborghini" (Skrillex and Rick Ross)	Sonny Moore; William Roberts; Shamann Cooke	Skrillex; Beat Billionaire	3:35
2.	"Sucker for Pain" (Lil Wayne, Wiz Khalifa and Imagine Dragons with Logic and Ty Dolla Sign featuring X Ambassadors)	Dwayne Carter; Cameron Thomaz; Daniel Sermon; Daniel Reynolds; Benjamin McKee; Daniel Platzman; Robert Hall; Tyrone Griffin Jr; Sam Harris; Alexander Grant	Alex Da Kid	4:04
3.	"Heathens" (Twenty One Pilots)	Tyler Joseph	Mike Elizondo; Joseph	3:15
4.	"Standing in the Rain" (Action Bronson, Mark Ronson and Dan Auerbach)	Ariyan Arslani; Mark Ronson; Daniel Auerbach; Vincent Bell	Ronson	3:22
5.	"Gangsta" (Kehlani)	Kehlani Parrish; Andrew Swanson; Jeremy Coleman; Holly Hafermann; Jason Evigan; Jacob Luttrell	Djemba Djemba; JMIKE	2:57
6.	"Know Better" (Kevin Gates)	Kevin Gilyard; Coleman; Tinashe Sibanda; Jim Lavigne; James Abrahart; Gamal Lewis; Frank Brim	JMIKE; T-Collar	3:28
7.	"You Don't Own Me" (Grace featuring G-Eazy)	John Madara; David White	Parker Ighile; Quincy Jones	3:19
8.	"Without Me" (Eminem)	Marshall Mathers; Jeffrey Bass; Anne Dudley; Kevin Bell; Trevor Horn; Malcolm McLaren	Eminem; Jeff Bass (co.); DJ Head (add.)	4:22
9.	"Wreak Havoc" (Skylar Grey)	Hafermann; Evigan; Glenda Proby	Evigan	3:48
10.	"Medieval Warfare" (Grimes)	Claire Boucher	Grimes	3:01
11.	"Bohemian Rhapsody" (Panic! at the Disco (originally made by Queen))	Freddie Mercury	Butch Walker	6:01
12.	"Slippin' into Darkness" (War)	Papa Dee Allen; Harold Brown; B.B. Dickerson; Lonnie Jordan; Charles Miller; Lee Oskar; Howard E. Scott	War	3:47
13.	"Fortunate Son" (Creedence Clearwater Revival)	John Fogerty	Fogerty	2:18
14.	"I Started a Joke" (ConfidentialMX featuring Becky Hanson)	Barry Gibb; Robin Gibb; Maurice Gibb	John Samuel Hanson; Kyle Biane	3:10
Total length:				50:31

Collector's Edition
No.	Title	Writer(s)	Producer(s)	Length
9.	"Super Freak" (Rick James)	James Johnson Jr.; Alonzo Miller	Rick James	3:26
15.	"Spirit in the Sky" (Norman Greenbaum)	Norman Greenbaum	Erik Jacobsen	4:04
16.	"I'd Rather Go Blind" (Etta James)	Jamesetta Hawkins; Ellington Jordan; Billy Foster	Rick Hall	2:35
Total length:				60:36

== Charts ==
=== Weekly charts ===
Weekly chart performance for Suicide Squad
Chart (2016)	Peak position
Australian Albums (ARIA)	1
Austrian Albums (Ö3 Austria)	3
Belgian Albums (Ultratop Flanders)	7
Belgian Albums (Ultratop Wallonia)	8
Canadian Albums (Billboard)	1
Czech Albums (ČNS IFPI)	2
Danish Albums (Hitlisten)	7
Dutch Albums (Album Top 100)	8
Finnish Albums (Suomen virallinen lista)	6
French Albums (SNEP)	9
German Albums (Offizielle Top 100)	9
Hungarian Albums (MAHASZ)	20
Italian Compilation Albums (FIMI)	4
Mexican Albums (Top 100 Mexico)	8
New Zealand Albums (RMNZ)	1
Norwegian Albums (VG-lista)	2
Spanish Albums (Promusicae)	9
Swiss Albums (Schweizer Hitparade)	3
UK Compilation Albums (Official Charts)	2
UK Soundtrack Albums (Official Charts)	8
US Billboard 200	1
US Soundtrack Albums (Billboard)	1
US Top Alternative Albums (Billboard)	1
US Top Rock Albums (Billboard)	1

Chart (2025)	Peak position
Croatian International Albums (HDU)	12

=== Year-end charts ===
2016 year-end chart performance for Suicide Squad
Chart (2016)	Position
Australian Albums (ARIA)	10
Belgian Albums (Ultratop Flanders)	140
Belgian Albums (Ultratop Wallonia)	163
Canadian Albums (Billboard)	19
Danish Albums (Hitlisten)	88
French Albums (SNEP)	123
Italian Compilation Albums (FIMI)	23
New Zealand Albums (RMNZ)	13
US Billboard 200	20
US Soundtrack Albums (Billboard)	2
US Top Alternative Albums (Billboard)	5
US Top Rock Albums (Billboard)	5

2017 year-end chart performance for Suicide Squad
Chart (2017)	Position
Australian Albums (ARIA)	36
Canadian Albums (Billboard)	40
French Albums (SNEP)	151
New Zealand Albums (RMNZ)	33
US Billboard 200	34
US Soundtrack Albums (Billboard)	7
US Top Alternative Albums (Billboard)	3
US Top Rock Albums (Billboard)	5

2018 year-end chart performance for Suicide Squad
Chart (2018)	Position
Australian Albums (ARIA)	68
US Soundtrack Albums (Billboard)	12
US Top Rock Albums (Billboard)	54

2019 year-end chart performance for Suicide Squad
Chart (2019)	Position
US Soundtrack Albums (Billboard)	12

2020 year-end chart performance for Suicide Squad
Chart (2020)	Position
US Soundtrack Albums (Billboard)	20

2021 year-end chart performance for Suicide Squad
Chart (2021)	Position
US Soundtrack Albums (Billboard)	9

2022 year-end chart performance for Suicide Squad
Chart (2022)	Position
US Soundtrack Albums (Billboard)	22

=== Decade-end charts ===
Decade-end chart performance for Suicide Squad
Chart (2010–2019)	Position
US Billboard 200	96

== Certifications ==
Certifications for Suicide Squad
Region	Certification	Certified units/sales
Australia (ARIA)	Gold	35,000^{^}
Canada (Music Canada)	Gold	40,000^{‡}
Denmark (IFPI Danmark)	Gold	10,000^{‡}
France (SNEP)	Platinum	100,000^{‡}
New Zealand (RMNZ)	Gold	7,500^{‡}
United Kingdom (BPI)	2× Platinum	600,000^{‡}
United States (RIAA)	2× Platinum	2,000,000^{‡}
^{^} Shipments figures based on certification alone.^{‡} Sales+streaming figures based on certification alone.

== Suicide Squad: Original Motion Picture Score ==
Suicide Squad: Original Motion Picture Score

Film score by Steven Price
- Released: August 8, 2016
- Recorded: 2016
- Genre: Film score
- Length: 72:33 (physical edition); 93:38 (digital edition)
- Label: WaterTower
- Producer: Steven Price

Steven Price chronology
The Hunt (2015)	Suicide Squad (2016)	Baby Driver – Music from the Motion Picture (2017)

=== Track listing ===
Suicide Squad: Original Motion Picture Score track listing
No.	Title	Length
1.	"Task Force X"	4:53
2.	"Arkham Asylum"	3:23
3.	"I'm Going to Figure This Out"	1:41
4.	"You Make My Teeth Hurt"	2:30
5.	"I Want to Assemble a Task Force"	2:52
6.	"Brother Our Time Has Come"	4:42
7.	"A Serial Killer Who Takes Credit Cards"	2:09
8.	"A Killer App"	2:53
9.	"That's How I Cut and Run"	3:09
10.	"We Got a Job to Do"	1:41
11.	"You Die We Die"	4:01
12.	"Harley and Joker"	2:49
13.	"This Bird Is Baked"	4:42
14.	"Hey Craziness"	4:01
15.	"You Need a Miracle"	2:36
16.	"Diablo's Story"	1:42
17.	"The Squad"	3:58
18.	"Are We Friends or Are We Foes?"	4:16
19.	"She's Behind You"	3:02
20.	"One Bullet Is All I Need"	3:32
21.	"I Thought I'd Killed You"	3:49
22.	"The Worst of the Worst"	4:11
Total length:		72:33

Digital edition bonus tracks
No.	Title	Length
23.	"June Moone"	2:37
24.	"Did That Tickle?"	3:41
25.	"You Know the Rules Hotness"	1:58
26.	"Enchantress in the War Room"	2:35
27.	"Introducing Diablo and Croc"	2:09
28.	"Task Force X Activated"	2:11
29.	"Can Everyone See This Trippy Stuff"	4:25
30.	"I Promised My Friends"	1:29
Total length:		93:38
