= Djemba Djemba =

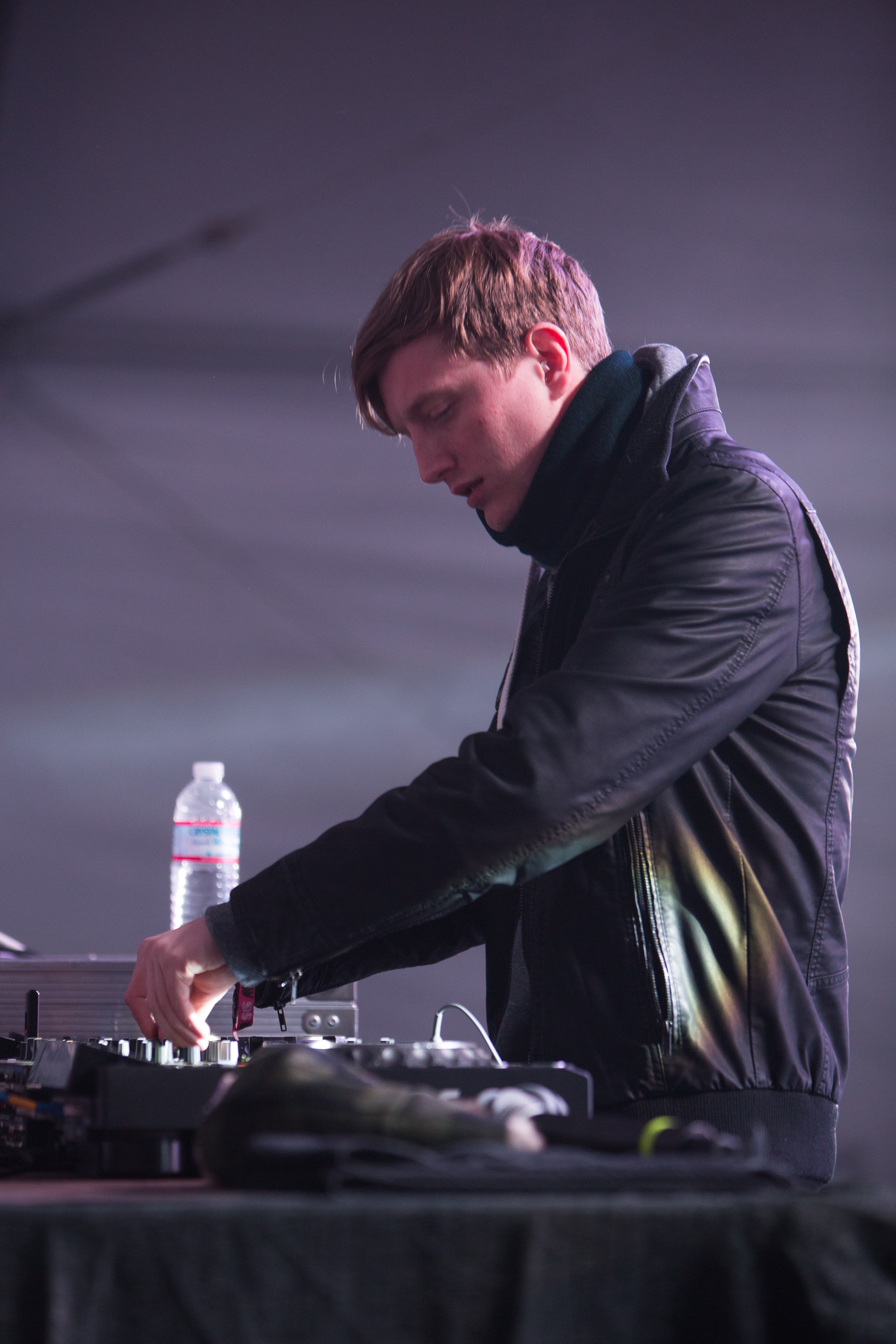
- Performing in 2014 at Snowglobe Festival

Background information
- Also known as: St Andrew, Magic in the Rain
- Born: Andrew Swanson; 4 August 1987 (age 39)
- Genres: Pop; EDM; Bass music
- Occupations: DJ; Record Producer
- Years active: 2009–present
- Labels: Rabbit Records; Mad Decent; Team Supreme

Andrew Swanson (born August 4, 1987), better known by his stage name, Djemba Djemba, is an American multi-platinum DJ and record producer of Pop, EDM and bass music, from Fairfield, IA. Notable works include "Elastic Heart" and "Gangsta". He has produced for Major Lazer, Alison Wonderland, Elijah Blake, Justin Bieber, Lu Han, Britney Spears, Sia, Madonna, and Kehlani. He also makes music as Magic in the Rain.

== Songwriting and other appearances ==
Song	Year	Artist	Album	Contribution
"Memphis"	2013	Justin Bieber	Journals	Producer
"Don't Sell Out"	2013	Tinie Tempah	Demonstration	Co-Producer, Drum Programming
"Passenger"	2013	Britney Spears	Britney Jean	Producer
"U Don't Know"	2014	Alison Wonderland	Run	Co-Producer
"Run"	2014	Alison Wonderland	Run	Co-Producer
"I Want U"	2014	Alison Wonderland	Run	Co-Producer
"Sugar High"	2014	Alison Wonderland	Run	Co-Producer
"Games"	2014	Alison Wonderland	Run	Co-Producer
"Valhalla"	2014	RL Grime ft. Djemba Djemba	Void	Co-Producer
"X"	2014	Chris Brown	X	Producer
"Elastic Heart"	2014	Sia	1000 Forms of Fear	Co-Producer
"Be Together"	2015	Major Lazer	Peace Is the Mission	Producer
"Night Riders"	2015	Major Lazer	Peace Is the Mission	Producer
"I Just Wanna..."	2015	Elijah Blake	I Just Wanna	Producer
"That Good Good"	2015	Luhan	Reloaded	Co-Producer
"Adventure Time"	2015	Luhan	Reloaded	Co-Producer
"Excited"	2015	Luhan	Reloaded	Producer
"Best Night"	2015	Madonna	Rebel Heart	Producer
"Give It to the Moment"	2015	Kiesza ft. Djemba Djemba	Give it to the Moment	Producer
"Waving Goodbye"	2016	Sia	The Neon Demon (Original Motion Picture Soundtrack)	Engineer, producer
"Gangsta"	2016	Kehlani	Suicide Squad: The Album	Co-Producer
"Overtake"	2016	Maribelle	Overtake	Producer
"Shout"	2016	Maribelle	Overtake	Producer
"Who We Are"	2016	Maribelle	Overtake	Producer
"Afterglow"	2016	Tkay Maidza	Tkay	Co-Producer
"Whatever Happened"	2016	Elijah Blake	Blueberry Vapors	Co-Producer
"Stay For It"	2017	RL Grime feat. Miguel	Stay For It	Composer
"Drowning Feat. Julius & Djemba"	2018	DJ Hoodboi feat. Djemba	Breathing Room EP	Co-Producer
"Catch Me"	2019	Jarina De Marco	Single	Co-Producer
"Ice Cream Girl"	2019	Tobi Lou	Live On Ice	Co-Producer
