= Can I (Kehlani song) =

2020 single by Kehlani featuring Tory Lanez

Single by Kehlani featuring Tory Lanez

from the album It Was Good Until It Wasn't
- Released: June 3, 2020
- Genre: R&B; neo soul
- Length: 2:59
- Label: TSNMI; Atlantic
- Songwriters: Kehlani Parrish; Daystar Peterson; Daniel Klein; Andrew Wansel; Jacob Dutton; Matt Campfield; Bryan-Michael Cox; Johntá Austin; Kevin Hicks; Phalon Alexander
- Producers: Pop Wansel; Jake One; Some Randoms

Kehlani singles chronology
"I Still" (2020)	"Can I" (2020)	"Birthday" (2020)

Tory Lanez singles chronology
"Temperature Rising" (2020)	"Can I" (2020)	"Goin' Up" (2020)

Music video
- "Can I" on YouTube

"Can I" is a song recorded by American singer Kehlani featuring Canadian singer and rapper Tory Lanez. It was sent to rhythmic contemporary radio on June 3, 2020, as the fourth single from Kehlani's second album It Was Good Until It Wasn't (2020). A video dedicated to sex workers was released on July 30, in which Lanez does not appear. Kehlani announced that Lanez's verse would be omitted from the album's planned deluxe edition, shortly after he was arrested for carrying a concealed firearm in his vehicle, an incident in which rapper Megan Thee Stallion was shot.

"Can I" is the highest-charting song from It Was Good Until It Wasn't, peaking at number 50 on the Billboard Hot 100. It is also Kehlani's third-highest charting song, behind "Gangsta" and their guest feature on "Ring" with Cardi B.

== Background ==
During a Twitter listening session, Kehlani said "Can I" is one of their favorite songs on the album, with their favorite line being "sniper gang no Bradley Cooper" a reference to Bradley Cooper's 2014 film American Sniper. Prior to its release, Lanez called it the "nastiest song on the project".

Following Lanez's arrest for having a concealed firearm outside a party, where rapper Megan Thee Stallion was shot in her feet, fans questioned Kehlani on the inclusion of Lanez's verse going forward. Kehlani explained on July 29, 2020, in a since-deleted tweet, that since the album came out months ago, they cannot remove the original, but "can only move forward", stating his verse would be removed and replaced on the album's deluxe edition and that he would not appear in the song's video either. The shooter was not revealed at the time, however Kehlani clarified: "I stand with women, believe women, & i love my friends. If that's something that turns you off from me or makes you no longer support, bless you forreal you have no reason to have ever supported me in the first place.. i'm not your cup of tea". Kehlani and Megan previously collaborated on "Hit My Phone" from Megan's EP Suga. Megan also performed a skit on It Was Good Until It Wasn't.

== Composition ==
Described as a seductive", "luxuriant sex jam", "Can I" is a neo soul, R&B ballad, detailing the "typical push-pull that exists between couples". It contains "spurts" of echoing guitar strings and "bubbly creaking", while, as noted by HotNewHipHop's Rose Lilah, "Kehlani gets [their] flow off, singing [their] lyrics stacked on top of one another, quickly ushering in the next line as [they] wrap up the first. Tory Lanez mimics the flow for his verse, too". The song interpolates the chorus of Aaliyah's 2002 song "Come Over". Kehlani previously interpolated "Come Over" on their 2017 track, "Personal".

== Critical reception ==
Various critics named the track a standout from its parent album. Hannah Mylrea of NME called it "a glowering cut", and said it is reminiscent of "early Drake, if only Drizzy had a penchant for neo-soul". musicOMH's Ben Devlin called the song an "effective collaboration", noting its "earworm verse that's hookier than the hook". Exclaim!'s Veracia Ankrah was less favorable, opining that it "lacks the clever subtlety of innuendos".

== Music video ==
The song's official video was released on July 30, 2020, directed by Sebastian Sdaigui and Kehlani (under their creative alias Hyphy Williams). It is Kehlani's sixth "quarantine style" video, due to the COVID-19 pandemic. Kehlani described the visual as an "ode to sex work, honoring sex workers, uplifting their movement". The video is similar to their previous single "Toxic", except the roles are reversed: Kehlani watches various sex workers, including some of their transgender friends, performing for them via live webcam. The video concludes with monologue from Kehlani's friend, writer and activist Da'Shaun Harrison talking about the difficulties faced by black sex work. Tory Lanez does not appear in the video, although his verse does.

== Charts ==
Chart (2020)	Peak position
Canada Hot 100 (Billboard)	71
New Zealand Hot Singles (RMNZ)	13
UK Singles (Official Charts)	85
US Billboard Hot 100	50
US Hot R&B/Hip-Hop Songs (Billboard)	20
US Rhythmic Airplay (Billboard)	31
US Rolling Stone Top 100	23

== Certifications ==
Certifications for "Can I"
Region	Certification	Certified units/sales
New Zealand (RMNZ)	Gold	15,000^{‡}
United States (RIAA)	Gold	500,000^{‡}
^{‡} Sales+streaming figures based on certification alone.
