= Nights Like This (Kehlani song) =

2019 single by Kehlani

Single by Kehlani featuring Ty Dolla Sign

from the album While We Wait
- Released: January 10, 2019
- Recorded: 2018
- Length: 3:22
- Label: Atlantic
- Songwriters: Kehlani Parrish; Danny Schofield; Brandon Hollemon; Nolan Lambroza
- Producer: Sir Nolan

Kehlani singles chronology
"Body Count (Remix)" (2018)	"Nights Like This" (2019)	"Butterfly" (2019)

Ty Dolla $ign singles chronology
"Bottled Up" (2018)	"Nights Like This" (2019)	"Think About Us" (2019)

Music video
- "Nights Like This" on YouTube

"Nights Like This" is a song by American singer Kehlani featuring Ty Dolla Sign. It was released on January 10, 2019, on Zane Lowe's World Record on Beats 1, as the lead single from their mixtape While We Wait. The song has surpassed over 700 million streams on Spotify as of March 2026.

== Background ==
"Nights Like This" was announced by Kehlani via their Instagram on January 7, 2019. The song was written by Kehlani, Nolan Lambroza and Ty Dolla Sign and produced by Sir Nolan.

The song's lyrics dissect a failed relationship, in which Kehlani questions the intentions of their former lover, a girl who is alluded to as being bisexual. Ty Dolla Sign's verse describes the perspective of the male referred to in the song.

== Music video ==
The song's accompanying music video premiered on January 10, 2019, on Kehlani's YouTube account, and as of September 2024 it has surpassed over 60 million views on YouTube.

== Personnel ==
- DannyBoyStyles – producer
- Sir Nolan – producer
- Tony Maserati – mixing engineer
- Agent 47 – vocal engineer
- Chris Athens – mastering engineer
- Elliott Trent - Writer

== Charts ==
=== Weekly charts ===
Chart (2019)	Peak position
Australia (ARIA)	41
Belgium (Ultratip Bubbling Under Flanders)	29
Canada Hot 100 (Billboard)	61
Czech Republic Singles Digital (ČNS IFPI)	80
Ireland (IRMA)	27
Lithuania (AGATA)	24
New Zealand (Recorded Music NZ)	28
Portugal (AFP)	68
Slovakia Singles Digital (ČNS IFPI)	45
Sweden (Sverigetopplistan)	76
UK Singles (Official Charts)	25
US Billboard Hot 100	67
US Hot R&B/Hip-Hop Songs (Billboard)	31
US Rhythmic Airplay (Billboard)	21

=== Year-end charts ===
Chart (2019)	Position
US Hot R&B/Hip-Hop Songs (Billboard)	94
US Rolling Stone Top 100	98

== Certifications ==
Certifications for "Nights Like This"
Region	Certification	Certified units/sales
Brazil (Pro-Música Brasil)	Platinum	40,000^{‡}
Canada (Music Canada)	4× Platinum	320,000^{‡}
Denmark (IFPI Danmark)	Gold	45,000^{‡}
New Zealand (RMNZ)	3× Platinum	90,000^{‡}
Portugal (AFP)	Gold	5,000^{‡}
United Kingdom (BPI)	Platinum	600,000^{‡}
United States (RIAA)	3× Platinum	3,000,000^{‡}
^{‡} Sales+streaming figures based on certification alone.

== Release history ==
Region	Date	Format	Label	Ref.
Various	January 10, 2019	Digital download; streaming	Atlantic	
