= Cloud 19 =

Mixtape by Kehlani
- Released: August 26, 2014; August 26, 2021 (streaming)
- Genre: R&B; hip hop
- Length: 25:28
- Label: Self-released (2014) Atlantic Records (2021)
- Producer: J Gramm Beats; Jahaan Sweet; JP Floyd; Nate Fox; Prophit; Red Vision; Swagg R'Celious; Tommy Hittz

Kehlani chronology
| Cloud 19 (2014) | You Should Be Here (2015) |

Singles from Cloud 19
- 1. "FWU" Released: October 23, 2015

Cloud 19 is the debut mixtape by American singer and songwriter Kehlani, who released it as a free digital download on August 26, 2014.

Cloud 19 is widely recognized as launching their music career, the mixtape ranked at twenty-eighth on Complex's list of the "50 Best Albums of 2014", and was also listed among Pitchfork's "Overlooked Mixtapes 2014". To commemorate the seventh anniversary on August 26, 2021, Kehlani's label Atlantic Records managed to acquire the masters of the mixtape and released Cloud 19 on streaming services.

== Promotion ==
The first song from the mixtape, "Get Away", was premiered on HotNewHipHop's website on July 16, 2014. A remix version featuring American rapper G-Eazy was published on November 21, 2014. The song, "FWU", had a music video released on November 3, 2014 and directed by Martín Estévez. David Drake of Complex named "FWU" as the third dope song you should be hearing everywhere soon. The music video for "1st Position" was directed by David Camarena, and it was released on January 20, 2015 as the last music video from the mixtape.

== Track listing ==
The tracklisting and credits for the album was revealed by HotNewHipHop.

| No. | Title | Producer(s) | Length |
|---|---|---|---|
| 1. | "FWU" | Swagg R'Celious | 3:22 |
| 2. | "As I Am" | Red Vision | 4:11 |
| 3. | "Get Away" | Jahaan Sweet; Swagg R'Celious | 3:20 |
| 4. | "Deserve Better" | Tommy Hittz | 2:26 |
| 5. | "How We Do Us" (featuring Kyle Dion) | Sweet | 3:39 |
| 6. | "1st Position" | Swagg R'Celious | 3:10 |
| 7. | "Act a Fool" (featuring Iamsu!) | Prophit | 2:55 |
| 8. | "Tell Your Mama" | Nate Fox; JP Floyd; J Gramm Beats | 2:25 |
| Total length: | | | 25:28 |

- On the streaming edition of the mixtape, "Act a Fool" was omitted from the tracklist.
