= Jahaan Sweet =

- Born: Jahaan Akil Sweet; February 10, 1993 (age 33); Jacksonville, Florida, United States
- Genres: Hip hop; R&B; jazz
- Occupations: Record producer; songwriter
- Instruments: Keyboards; sampler; bass; flute; Logic Pro
- Labels: Kobalt; MBK; TSNMI

Jahaan Akil Sweet (born February 10, 1993) is an American record producer, songwriter, and pianist from Jacksonville, Florida. Sweet was first credited with production work on projects by California-based singer Kehlani, whom he met at Juilliard School in 2014. He co-produced her mixtapes Cloud 19 (2014) and You Should Be Here (2015), and has since worked with artists including Drake, Taylor Swift, A Boogie wit da Hoodie, Eminem, the Carters, Travis Scott, and Don Toliver. Sweet has been credited on the singles "Lavender Haze" (2023) by Swift, "Lucky You" (2018) by Eminem, and "K-pop" and "Fein" (both 2023) by Travis Scott, all of which have peaked within the top ten of the Billboard Hot 100.

Sweet has won two Grammy Awards from five nominations. The Carters' Everything Is Love and Jon Batiste's We Are—two of his productions—won Best Urban Contemporary Album in 2019, and Album of the Year in 2022, respectively.

== Early life ==
Sweet was born and raised in North Jacksonville, Florida. He began playing piano at the age of six, and jazz piano at Lavilla School of the Arts by the age of eleven. After attending high school at Douglas Anderson School of the Arts, Sweet moved to New York City to attend Juilliard School's jazz studies program. In 2015, he was named a Juilliard Career Advancement Fellow.

== Career ==
In an interview with The Recording Academy, Sweet revealed that he met Kehlani at MBK Studios in New York while still attending school. From there, he produced two songs, "Get Away" and "How We Do Us", on Kehlani's project Cloud19. Sweet later flew back and forth between New York and Los Angeles to work with Kehlani on her subsequent mixtape, You Should Be Here, before graduating from Juilliard in 2015.

In 2016 and 2017, Sweet produced tracks for a number of notable albums including Ty Dolla Sign's Campaign ("Zaddy" and "$"), A Boogie wit da Hoodie's The Bigger Artist ("Drowning"), Kehlani's SweetSexySavage ("Keep On" and "Personal"), Aminé's Good for You ("Veggies", "Slide", and "Heebiejeebies"), and Lana Del Rey's Lust for Life ("Summer Bummer").

In 2018, Sweet worked with Boi-1da to co-produce songs for Drake (Scorpion; "8 Out of 10", "Final Fantasy", and "Ratchet Happy Birthday"), The Carters (Everything Is Love; "Friends" and "Heard About Us"), and Eminem (Kamikaze; "Lucky You").

== Awards and nominations ==
Apart from winning the Grammy Awards, Sweet has been featured in Forbes 30 under 30 2021 list.

=== Grammy Awards ===
In 2016, Sweet was nominated for his work on Kehlani's You Should Be Here for Best Urban Contemporary Album at the 58th Annual Grammy Awards. In 2019, he was nominated thrice, winning Best Urban Contemporary Album for The Carters' Everything Is Love. In 2022, he won Album of the Year for his work on Jon Batiste's We Are.

Year	Nominee/Work	Award	Result
2016	You Should Be Here (Kehlani)	Best Urban Contemporary Album	Nominated
2019	Everything Is Love (The Carters)	Best Urban Contemporary Album	Won
2019	Scorpion (Drake)	Album of the Year	Nominated
2019	"Lucky You" (Eminem ft. Joyner Lucas)	Best Rap Song	Nominated
2022	We Are (Jon Batiste)	Album of the Year	Won
