= Distraction (Kehlani song) =

2016 single by Kehlani

Single by Kehlani

from the album SweetSexySavage
- Released: July 23, 2016
- Recorded: 2016
- Genre: R&B
- Length: 3:55
- Label: Atlantic
- Songwriter(s): Kehlani Parrish; Andrew "Pop" Wansel; Warren "Oak" Felder; Daniel Klein; Matthew Campfield
- Producer(s): Pop & Oak; Campfield; Klein

Kehlani singles chronology
"CRZY" (2016)	"Distraction" (2016)	"Gangsta" (2016)

Music video
- "Distraction" on YouTube

"Distraction" is a song by American singer and songwriter Kehlani. It was released on July 23, 2016, and serves as the second single from her debut album SweetSexySavage (2016). In the song, Kehlani asks if a lover is willing to distract her from her work. The single was nominated for Best R&B Performance at the 60th Grammy Awards, marking Kehlani's second Grammy Award nomination.

== Music video ==
The song's accompanying music video premiered on November 22, 2016 on Kehlani's YouTube account. The music video was directed by Yashxani.

== Charts ==
Chart (2016)	Peak position
US Billboard Hot 100	85
US Hot R&B/Hip-Hop Songs (Billboard)	42
US Rhythmic (Billboard)	23

== Certifications ==
Certifications for "Distraction"
Region	Certification	Certified units/sales
New Zealand (RMNZ)	Platinum	30,000^{‡}
United States (RIAA)	Platinum	1,000,000^{‡}
^{‡} Sales+streaming figures based on certification alone.
