= Crzy =

Single by Kehlani

from the album SweetSexySavage
- Released: July 16, 2016
- Recorded: 2016
- Genre: R&B
- Length: 3:11
- Label: Atlantic
- Songwriters: Kehlani Parrish; Denisia "Blu June" Andrews; Brittany "Chi" Coney
- Producer: Nova Wav

Kehlani singles chronology
"Wrong" (2016)	"Crzy" (2016)	"Distraction" (2016)

Music video
- "CRZY" on YouTube

"Crzy" (stylized in all caps and pronounced "crazy") is a song by American singer and songwriter Kehlani. It was released on July 16, 2016 and serves as the lead single from their debut album, SweetSexySavage. The song was produced by female R&B and pop duo Nova Wav.

== Background ==
"Crzy" was written by Kehlani and produced by Nova Wav, a Grammy Award-winning songwriting and production team consisting of Denisia "Blu June" Andrews and Brittany "Chi" Coney. They said the song was made in an effort to "create an unapologetic statement embracing the challenges and double standards that come with being a woman".

The song sees Kehlani take on an assertive and boastful tone over a trap-influenced R&B beat as they tell the listener not to discredit their passion, talent and achievements.

== Music video ==
The song's accompanying music video premiered on September 21, 2016 on Kehlani's YouTube account. The music video was directed by Benny Boom.

== Remix ==
The official remix of the song, featuring American rapper A Boogie wit da Hoodie, was released on November 17, 2016.

== Charts ==
Chart (2016)	Peak position
US Billboard Hot 100	85
US Hot R&B/Hip-Hop Songs (Billboard)	37
US Rhythmic Airplay (Billboard)	13

== Certifications ==
Certifications for "Crzy"
Region	Certification	Certified units/sales
Canada (Music Canada)	Platinum	80,000^{‡}
New Zealand (RMNZ)	Gold	15,000^{‡}
United States (RIAA)	Platinum	1,000,000^{‡}
^{‡} Sales+streaming figures based on certification alone.
