= Gangsta (Kehlani song) =

Single by Kehlani

from the album Suicide Squad: The Album and SweetSexySavage (deluxe edition)
- Released: August 1, 2016
- Recorded: 2016
- Studio: Atlantic Studios (Los Angeles, California)
- Genre: Alternative R&B
- Length: 2:57
- Label: Atlantic
- Songwriters: Kehlani Parrish; Skylar Grey; Andrew Swanson; Jeremy Coleman; Jason Evigan; Jacob Luttrell
- Producers: JMIKE; Djemba Djemba

Kehlani singles chronology
"Distraction" (2016)	"Gangsta" (2016)	"Keep On" (2017)

Suicide Squad singles chronology
"Purple Lamborghini" (2016)	"Gangsta" (2016)	"Standing in the Rain" (2016)

Music video
- "Gangsta" on YouTube

"Gangsta" is a song by American singer and songwriter Kehlani. It serves as the fourth and final single from the Suicide Squad soundtrack. The song was released on August 1, 2016 by Atlantic Records and was written by Kehlani, Myron Birdsong, Skylar Grey, Andrew Swanson and JMIKE, with the latter two also producing the song. Lyrically the song speaks to their desire for a gangster's love for them referring to the relationship between The Joker and Harley Quinn in the movie from the latter's point of view. The song is also featured on the deluxe edition of SweetSexySavage.

== Music video ==
The music video premiered in August 2016 on Kehlani's YouTube account. In the video Kehlani is seen in places making multiple references to the movie. They start lying in a room of broken glass next to the bat Harley uses in the movie, swimming in a pool of water similar to acid Harley dives into, performing aerial acrobatics on the ceiling, dancing in a club for a love interest who looks similar to the Joker with green hair, tattoos and purple clothes and finally meeting that love interest outside. This is intercut with scenes from the movie showing the relationship of Harley and the Joker.

== Charts ==
=== Weekly charts ===
Chart (2016–2017)	Peak position
Australia (ARIA)	61
Austria (Ö3 Austria Top 40)	54
Canada Hot 100 (Billboard)	37
Czech Republic Singles Digital (ČNS IFPI)	56
France (SNEP)	81
Ireland (IRMA)	76
Italy (FIMI)	66
New Zealand Heatseekers (Recorded Music NZ)	2
Portugal (AFP)	49
Scottish Singles Sales (Official Charts)	41
Slovakia Singles Digital (ČNS IFPI)	39
Sweden Heatseeker (Sverigetopplistan)	9
UK Singles (Official Charts)	57
UK Hip Hop/R&B (Official Charts)	12
US Billboard Hot 100	41
US Hot R&B/Hip-Hop Songs (Billboard)	13

=== Year-end charts ===
Chart (2016)	Position
US Hot R&B/Hip-Hop Songs (Billboard)	84

== Certifications ==
Certifications for "Gangsta"
Region	Certification	Certified units/sales
Austria (IFPI Austria)	Gold	15,000^{‡}
Canada (Music Canada)	3× Platinum	240,000^{‡}
Denmark (IFPI Danmark)	Gold	45,000^{‡}
New Zealand (RMNZ)	Platinum	30,000^{‡}
Poland (ZPAV)	Gold	25,000^{‡}
Portugal (AFP)	Gold	5,000^{‡}
United Kingdom (BPI)	Gold	400,000^{‡}
United States (RIAA)	Platinum	1,000,000^{‡}
^{‡} Sales+streaming figures based on certification alone.
