= Leon Thomas discography =

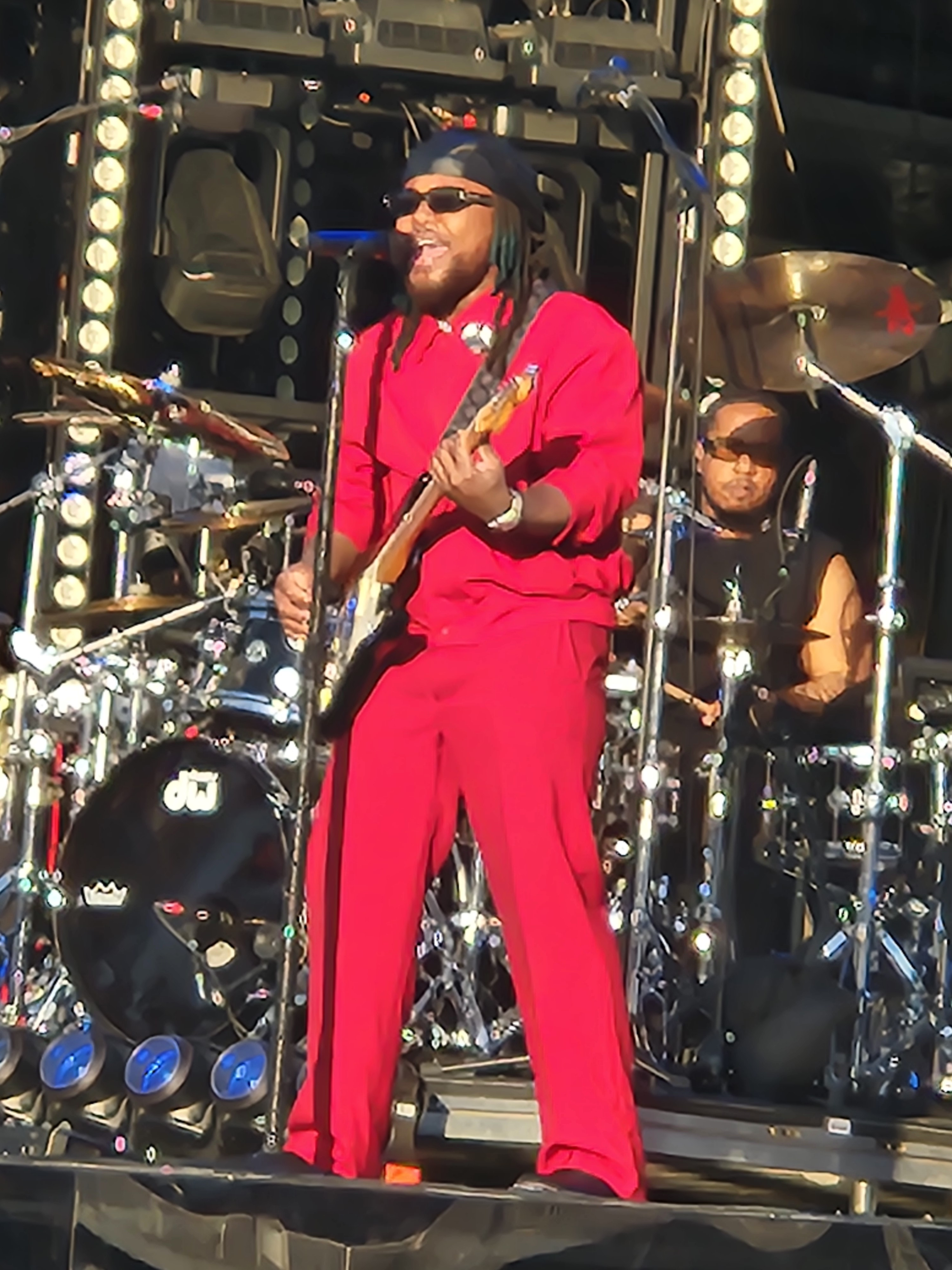
- Leon Thomas in 2026
- Studio albums: 2
- EPs: 2
- Mixtapes: 3
- Singles: 37
- Promotional singles: 5

The discography of American singer, songwriter, producer and actor Leon Thomas consists of 2 studio albums, 3 mixtapes, 2 extended plays, 37 singles (18 as a lead artist) and 5 promotional singles.

== Studio albums ==
Title	Details	Peak chart positions			Certifications
Title	Details	US	AUS	NZ	Certifications
Electric Dusk	Released: August 18, 2023; Label: EZMNY, Motown; Format: Digital download, streaming, vinyl	—	—	—	
Mutt	Released: September 27, 2024; Label: EZMNY, Motown; Format: Digital download, streaming, vinyl	35	50	39	RIAA: Gold

== Mixtapes ==
List of mixtapes
Title	Mixtape details
Metro Hearts	Released: August 1, 2012; Formats: CD, digital download; Label: Rostrum
V1bes	Released: January 1, 2014; Format: CD, digital download; Label: Rostrum
Before the Beginning	Released: October 25, 2016; Formats: Digital download; Label: Rostrum

== Extended plays ==
List of extended plays
Title	Extended play details
Genesis	Released: August 24, 2018; Formats: Digital download, streaming; Label: Rostrum
Pholks	Released: October 24, 2025; Formats: Digital download, streaming; Label: EZMNY, Motown

== Singles ==
=== As lead artist ===
List of singles as lead artist, with selected chart positions, showing year released and album name
Title	Year	Peak chart positions									Certifications	Album
Title	Year	US	US R&B/ HH	US Adult R&B	AUS	CAN	IRE	NZ	UK	WW	Certifications	Album
"Hello How Are You" (featuring Wiz Khalifa)	2013	—	—	—	—	—	—	—	—	—		Non-album single
"Favorite" (featuring Buddy)	2018	—	—	17	—	—	—	—	—	—		Genesis
"Sunken Place"	2018	—	—	—	—	—	—	—	—	—		Genesis
"X-Rated" (featuring Benny the Butcher)	2022	—	—	—	—	—	—	—	—	—		Electric Dusk
"Love Jones" (featuring Ty Dolla Sign)	2022	—	—	—	—	—	—	—	—	—		Electric Dusk
"Breaking Point" (solo or remix featuring Victoria Monét)	2022	—	—	—	—	—	—	—	—	—		Electric Dusk
"Crash & Burn"	2023	—	—	—	—	—	—	—	—	—		Electric Dusk
"Dangerous Game” (with Esta.)	2024	—	—	—	—	—	—	—	—	—		Francis
"Mutt"	2024	6	1	—	19	41	51	2	17	28	ARIA: 2× Platinum; RIAA: 2× Platinum	Mutt
"Far Fetched" (featuring Ty Dolla Sign)	2024	—	—	—	—	—	—	—	—	—		Mutt
"Rather Be Alone" (featuring Halle)	2025	—	—	—	—	—	—	—	—	—		Mutt
"Catching Feelings" (with Annie Tracy)	2025	—	—	—	—	—	—	—	—	—		Scared of Heights
"Lovers or Friends" (with YG)	2025	—	—	—	—	—	—	— (Note: "Lovers or Friends" did not enter the NZ Top 40 Singles Chart, but peaked at number 15 on the NZ Hot Singles Chart.)	—	—		Non-album single
"Yes It Is"	2025	—	43	—	—	—	—	—	—	—	RIAA: Gold	Mutt
"Just How You Are"	2025	—	—	—	—	—	—	—	—	—		Pholks
"My Muse"	2025	—	—	—	—	—	—	—	—	—		Pholks
"Deeper" (with Disclosure)	2025	—	—	—	—	—	—	—	—	—		TBA
"Miss U 2" (with Ty Dolla Sign)	2026	—	—	—	—	—	—	— (Note: "Miss U 2" did not enter the NZ Top 40 Singles Chart, but peaked at number 32 on the NZ Hot Singles Chart.)	—	—		Girl Music Vol. 1
"Trophy"	2026	—	—	—	—	—	—	— (Note: "Trophy" did not enter the NZ Top 40 Singles Chart, but peaked at number 13 on the NZ Hot Singles Chart.)	—	—		Non-album single
"—" denotes releases that did not chart or were not released in that territory.

=== As featured artist ===
List of singles as featured artist, showing year released and album name
Title	Year	Peak chart positions						Album
Title	Year	US	US R&B/HH	NGR	NZ	SA	UK	Album
"Rendezvous" (Kronic featuring Leon Thomas)	2017	—	—	—	—	—	—	Non-album singles
"Sho Enough" (Philly Swain featuring Leon Thomas and Safaree)	2017	—	—	—	—	—	—	Non-album singles
"Aimless" (Bizzy Crook featuring Lexii Alijai and Leon Thomas)	2018	—	—	—	—	—	—	Non-album singles
"Too Much" (Bizzy Crook featuring Leon Thomas)	2019	—	—	—	—	—	—	Non-album singles
"Settle" (Kosine featuring Leon Thomas)	2021	—	—	—	—	—	—	Non-album singles
"Lucky" (Tish Hyman featuring LaRussell and Leon Thomas)	2023	—	—	—	—	—	—	Non-album singles
"Sweetness” (Elmiene featuring Leon Thomas)	2024	—	—	—	—	—	—	Non-album singles
"Here We Go (Uh Oh)" (Remix) (Coco Jones featuring Leon Thomas)	2025	—	38	—	—	—	—	Why Not More?
"Who Are You Anyways?" (Rory featuring Leon Thomas)	2025	—	—	—	—	—	—	Non-album singles
"Damage" (Romani featuring Leon Thomas)	2025	—	—	—	—	—	—	Non-album singles
"Miami" (Odeal featuring Leon Thomas)	2025	—	—	—	—	—	—	Non-album singles
"Twisting" (Venna featuring Leon Thomas)	2025	—	—	—	—	—	—	Non-album singles
"Move It Along" (Sasha Keable featuring Leon Thomas)	2025	—	—	—	—	—	—	Non-album singles
"Fallin'" (Chris Brown featuring Leon Thomas)	2026	80	19	68	31	52	87	Brown

=== Promotional singles ===
List of promotional singles, with selected chart positions, showing year released and album name
Title	Year	Peak chart positions	Album
Title	Year	US Kid	Album
"It's You" (with Jessie Payo)	2010	—	Rising Stars
"Countdown" (Victorious cast featuring Leon Thomas III and Victoria Justice)	2012	10	Victorious 2.0: More Music from the Hit TV Show
"Come Clean" (with Michelle DeShon)	2014	—	Non-album single
"PLW"	2018	—	Genesis
"Until the End of Time" (with Coco Jones)	2023	—	Non-album single
"—" denotes releases that did not chart or were not released in that territory.

== Other charted songs ==
List of other charted songs, with selected chart positions, showing year released and album name
Title	Year	Peak chart positions					Album
Title	Year	US	US Kid	US R&B /HH	US R&B	NZ Hot	Album
"Song 2 You" (Victorious cast featuring Leon Thomas III and Victoria Justice)	2011	—	8	—	—	—	Victorious: Music from the Hit TV Show
"Tell Me That You Love Me" (Victorious cast featuring Victoria Justice and Leon Thomas III)	2011	—	11	—	—	—	Victorious: Music from the Hit TV Show
"Not Fair"	2025	—	—	43	—	23	Mutt Deluxe: Heel
"Dirt on My Shoes" (featuring Kehlani)	2025	—	—	—	—	36	Mutt Deluxe: Heel
"Watching Us" (Wale featuring Leon Thomas)	2025	76	—	14	—	—	Everything Is a Lot
"Sweet Nuthins" (Kehlani featuring Leon Thomas)	2025	—	48	—	23	11	Kehlani

== Guest appearances ==
List of non-single releases, showing year released and album name
Title	Year	Other artist(s)	Album
"Sing the Day"	2006	Anika Noni Rose, Harrison Chad, Marcus Carl Franklin	Bambi II
"La Bamba"	2007	None	August Rush
"I Like That Girl"	2008	None	iCarly: Music from and Inspired by the Hit TV Show
"Free to Fall"	2010	Kyle Riabko, Jessie Payo, Natalie Hall	Rising Stars
"A Better Day"	2010	Kyle Riabko	Rising Stars
"All I Want"	2011	Roshon Fegan	Non-album song
"365 Days"	2012	Victorious cast	Victorious 3.0: Even More Music from the Hit TV Show
"Yes We Can"	2013	Nat & Alex Wolff, Natasha Bedingfield	Throwbacks
"Can We Talk"	2013	Berner, Erk tha Jerk	Drugstore Cowboy
"Show Us"	2014	None	Non-album songs
"Miss You"	2014	None	Non-album songs
"Nothing"	2014	None	The Best of Both Offices Compilation Vol. 4
"Too Long"	2015	None	Non-album song
"Fire"	2016	Finding Noyvon, J.Kelr	Believe in MPLS
"Teacher"	2016	Yonni	#TheGift
"Balance"	2017	RichGains, GLC, Nate Mercereau	Gains
"Zen"	2018	Bizzy Crook	Before I Jump
"Arcadia (For the Land)"	2020	WavelQ	Arcadia
"Lord Knows"	2022	Steelo, Dej Loaf	Eldorado Excursions
"Patience (Remix)	2022	Eric Bellinger	New Light: The Remixes
"Cowrie Charms"	2023	Yussef Dayes, Barbara Hicks	Black Classical Music
"Is There Someone New?"	2024	Yung Bleu	Jeremy
"Guilty"	2024	Conductor Williams	Conductor We Have A Problem, Pt. 3
"New Flower!"	2025	Aminé	13 Months of Sunshine
"Sweet Nuthins"	2026	Kehlani	Kehlani
"Run It Up"	2026	The Game	The Documentary III

== Music videos ==
List of music videos, showing year released, other artists featured and directors
Title	Year	Other artist(s)	Director(s)	Ref.
As an artist
"All I Want"	2011	Roshon Fegan	Unknown	
"Hello How Are You"	2013	Wiz Khalifa	Unknown	
"Snapchat"	2015	Yonni, Eric Bellinger, A-Roc, Rayven Justice	Unknown	
"Favorite"	2018	Buddy	Unknown	
"PLW"	2018	None	€¥£$	
"X-Rated"	2022	Benny the Butcher	Cameron Dean, Leon Thomas	
"Love Jones"	2022	Ty Dolla Sign	Cameron Dean	
"Breaking Point"	2023	None		
"Sweetness"	2024	Elmiene		
"Far Fetched"	2024	Ty Dolla Sign		
"Dangerous Game"	2024	ESTA.	Marti Alonzo	
"Mutt (Remix)	2024	Freddie Gibbs	Daniil Demichev	
"My Muse"	2025	None	Arrad	
Guest appearances
"Make It Shine"	2010	Victorious cast, Victoria Justice	Unknown	
"Freak the Freak Out"	2010	Victorious cast, Victoria Justice	Marcus Wagner	
"Beggin' on Your Knees"	2011	Victorious cast, Victoria Justice	Marcus Wagner	
"Leave It All to Shine"	2011	iCarly and Victorious casts, Miranda Cosgrove, Victoria Justice	Unknown	
"All I Want Is Everything"	2011	Victorious cast, Victoria Justice	Lex Halaby	
"Make It in America"	2012	Victorious cast, Victoria Justice	Anna Mastro	
"L.A. Boyz"	2012	Victorious cast, Victoria Justice, Ariana Grande	Unknown	
"Here's 2 Us"	2012	Victorious cast, Victoria Justice	Unknown	
"You Don't Know Me"	2012	Victorious cast, Elizabeth Gillies	Unknown	

== Production and songwriting credits ==
Title	Year	Artist(s)	Album	Notes
"Best Friend"	2013	RaVaughn	Non-album single	Writing
"Honeymoon Avenue"	2013	Ariana Grande	Yours Truly	Writing
"Tattooed Heart"	2013	Ariana Grande	Yours Truly	Writing
"Lovin' It"	2013	Ariana Grande	Yours Truly	Writing
"You'll Never Know"	2013	Ariana Grande	Yours Truly	Writing
"Love Is Everything"	2013	Ariana Grande	Christmas Kisses	Writing
"Snow in California"	2013	Ariana Grande	Christmas Kisses	Writing
"Say So"	2013	Smokie Norful	Non-album single	Writing
"I'd Rather Be Broke"	2014	Toni Braxton	Love, Marriage & Divorce	Writing
"Can I Get a Moment?"	2014	Jessica Mauboy	Beautiful	Writing
"Kinda Miss You"	2015	Deborah Cox	Non-album single	Writing
"Shake That"	2015	Samantha Jade, Pitbull	Nine	Writing
"Hide & Freak"	2015	SoMo, Trey Songz	My Life II	Writing
"Every Day Is Christmas"	2015	The Braxtons	Braxton Family Christmas	Writing
"Something New"	2016	Zendaya, Chris Brown	Non-album single	Writing
"Yours Truly, Austin Post"	2016	Post Malone	Stoney	Production and writing
"Andrea"	2017	Freddie Gibbs	You Only Live 2wice	Writing
"Phone Lit"	2017	Freddie Gibbs	You Only Live 2wice	Writing
"Homesick"	2017	Freddie Gibbs	You Only Live 2wice	Writing
"Earth Girls"	2017	Jesse Boykins III	Bartholomew	Writing
"Reckless"	2018	Arin Ray	Platinum Fire	Writing
"Geek'd"	2018	Bhad Bhabie, Lil Baby	15	Writing
"Immigrant"	2018	Belly, Meek Mill, M.I.A.	Immigrant	Production and writing
"Sugar Free"	2018	Riri	Neo	Writing
"This Forever"	2018	Kodak Black	Dying to Live	Production and writing
"Butterfly"	2019	Kehlani	While We Wait	Writing
"Woah"	2019	Rich the Kid, Miguel, Ty Dolla Sign	The World Is Yours 2	Writing
"Remember Me"	2019	Smokepurpp	Lost Planet 2.0	Writing
"Summer Magic"	2019	Ai	It's All Me, Vol. 1	Writing
"On My Mind"	2019	Snoh Aalegra, James Fauntleroy	Temporary Highs in the Violet Skies	Production and writing
"Gold Roses"	2019	Rick Ross, Drake	Port of Miami 2	Writing
"Crown"	2019	Russ	Non-album single	Writing
"Scary Nights"	2019	G-Eazy	Scary Nights	Writing
"You Know Wassup"	2019	Kehlani	Non-album single	Writing
"The Get Down"	2019	Arin Ray	Phases II	Writing
"Don't"	2020	Rebecca Garton	Non-album singles	Writing
"Valentine's Day (Shameful)"	2020	Kehlani	Non-album singles	Writing
"Superstar"	2020	24hrs, Ty Dolla Sign, DJ Drama	12 AM in Atlanta 2	Writing
"Has a Meaning"	2020	Sid Tipton, Timbaland	Timbaland's Beat Saber Music Pack by BeatClub	Writing
"Grieving"	2020	Kehlani, James Blake	It Was Good Until It Wasn't	Writing
"Envious"	2020	Aluna	Renaissance	Writing
"Back It Up"	2020	Lil Tecca	Virgo World	Production and writing
"Not Another Love Song"	2020	Ella Mai	Heart on My Sleeve	Writing
"Dumb Shit"	2020	Good Girl	Good Girl	Writing
"Safety Net"	2020	Ariana Grande, Ty Dolla Sign	Positions	Writing
"Nasty"	2020	Ariana Grande	Positions	Writing
"I Love Me"	2020	Russ	Non-album single	Writing
"Ain't It Funny"	2020	Vory, Meek Mill	Vory	Writing
"Don't 4get"	2020	Vory	Vory	Writing
"All to Me"	2021	Giveon	When It's All Said and Done... Take Time	Production and writing
"One Time"	2021	MK XYZ	Sweet Spot	Writing
"In the Bible"	2021	Drake, Lil Durk, Giveon	Certified Lover Boy	Production and writing
"Love All"	2021	Drake, Jay-Z	Certified Lover Boy	Production and writing
"Pipe Down"	2021	Drake	Certified Lover Boy	Production and writing
"For Tonight"	2021	Giveon	Give or Take	Writing
"Wicked Freestyle"	2021	Nardo Wick	Who Is Nardo Wick?	Production and writing
"Rent Free"	2021	6lack	Non-album single	Production and writing
"High School Crush"	2022	Buddy	Superghetto	Production and writing
"Heaven's EP"	2022	Dreamville, J. Cole	D-Day: A Gangsta Grillz Mixtape	Production and writing
"Rich Shit"	2022	Lil Gotit, Lil Keed, Ty Dolla Sign	The Cheater	Production and writing
"Poison"	2022	Jack Harlow, Lil Wayne	Come Home the Kids Miss You	Production and writing
"Let Me Go"	2022	Giveon	Give or Take	Production and writing
"Scarred"	2022	Giveon	Give or Take	Production and writing
"This Will Do"	2022	Giveon	Give or Take	Writing
"Get to You"	2022	Giveon	Give or Take	Writing
"July 16th"	2022	Giveon	Give or Take	Production and writing
"Lost Me"	2022	Giveon	Give or Take	Production and writing
"Another Heartbreak"	2022	Giveon	Give or Take	Production and writing
"All Wolves Go to Heaven"	2022	YoDogg, Cardo Got Wings	Raised by Wolves	Production and writing
"Seamless"	2022	Babyface, Kehlani	Girls Night Out	Production and writing
"Try"	2022	Phony Ppl, JoJo	Euphonyus	Writing
"Snooze"	2022	SZA	SOS	Production and writing
"Happy"	2023	Princess Nokia	I Love You but This Is Goodbye	Writing
"Wolves"	2023	Lauren Jauregui, Russ, Ty Dolla Sign	In Between	Production and writing
"Undefeated"	2023	Mike Dimes	Texas Boy	Production and writing
"Gone"	2023	Kiana Ledé, Bryson Tiller	Grudges	Production and writing
"System"	2023	SheedTs	C My Side	Production and writing
"Mean It"	2023	6lack	Non-album single	Production and writing
"Luchas Mentales"	2024	Eladio Carrión	Sol María	Production and writing
"Burn"	2024	¥$	Vultures 1	Production and writing
"Ciao!"	2024	Bryson Tiller	Bryson Tiller	Production and writing
"My Way"	2024	Charlotte Day Wilson	Cyan Blue	Production and writing
"Last Heartbreak Song"	2024	Ayra Starr, Giveon	The Year I Turned 21	Writing
"Sweep It Up"	2024	Coco Jones	Non-album single	Writing
"Questions"	2024	Mario	Glad You Came	Production and writing
