= Everything Is a Lot =

2025 studio album by Wale

Studio album by Wale
- Released: November 14, 2025
- Recorded: 2023–2025
- Genres: Hip-hop; Afrobeats
- Length: 52:26
- Labels: EQT; Def Jam
- Producers: Wale; Aladdin; B100; Bnyx; Brian Wall; Cheeze Beatz; Cole YoursTruly; D. Phelps; D.Woo; Dawda; Freaky Rob; Genio Bambino; Ghost-Note; Go Grizzly; Hollywood Cole; Jacques Pierre; Johnny Winik; KDaGreat; Kel-P; Keyflo Music; Kuttabeatz; Lee Major; Legendury Beatz; Lenyz; Mike Hector; Nile Hargrove; Nova; OzMoses Arketex; P2J; Pooh Beatz; Red Vision; Sean Momberger; Squat Beats; StreetRunner; Tarik Azzouz

Wale chronology
Folarin II (2021)	Everything Is a Lot (2025)

Professional ratings
Review scores
Source	Rating
AllMusic	3.5/5 stars

Everything Is a Lot (stylized as everything is a lot.) is the eighth studio album by American rapper Wale. Released on November 14, 2025, through Def Jam Recordings, the album serves as Wale's first project under Def Jam following his departure from Maybach Music Group in 2023, and his first studio album since Folarin II in 2021. The production on the album was handled by several producers including Wale himself, Bnyx, Go Grizzly and Pooh Beatz, among others. The album features guest appearances from Bnyx, Leon Thomas, Teni, Seyi Vibez, Kel-P, Odumodublvck, Odeal, Andra Day, Ty Dolla Sign, Nino Paid, and Shaboozey. The album was supported by three singles: "Mirroronnabenz", "City on Fire", and "Belly". The album debuted on number 19 on US Billboard 200.

== Background ==
On October 19, 2023, it was announced that Wale had signed with Def Jam earlier that year, ending a twelve-year partnership between the rapper and Maybach Music Group.

On March 21, 2025, Wale released "Blanco", the lead single off the album. The second single from the album, "Where to Start", was released on June 20. Wale announced the album and its release date on October 13, 2025.

== Track listing ==
Everything Is a Lot track listing
No.	Title	Writer(s)	Producer(s)	Length
1.	"Conundrum"	Olubowale Victor Akintimehin; Nicholas Warwar; Tarik Azzouz; Keith Douglas Sweat; Fitzgerald Scott; Omar Walker	Wale; StreetRunner; Tarik Azzouz; Lenyz	2:08
2.	"Belly"	Akintimehin; Leigh Elliott; Sean Momberger; Trevor Beresford Romeo; Albin de la Simone; Paul Andrew Hooper; Marty James Garton Jr.; Caron Melina Wheeler; Jarrett Todd; Johnny Coddaire; Johnny Winik	Lee Major; Sean Momberger; Keyflo Music	3:08
3.	"Where to Start"	Akintimehin; Kameron Cole; Brian Alexander Morgan	Hollywood Cole	3:33
4.	"Blanco"	Akintimehin; Reginaldo Rojo Jr.; Adam Hayman; Thomas Goodwin; Walker Johnson	Red Vision	3:10
5.	"Michael Fredo (Intro)"	Akintimehin; Winik; Coddaire; Warwar; Azzouz; Robert Russell Bennett; Richard Charles Rodgers	Johnny Winik	0:40
6.	"Michael Fredo"	Akintimehin; Winik; Warwar; Azzouz; Coddaire; Bennett; Rodgers	Johnny Winik; StreetRunner; Tarik Azzouz	2:13
7.	"Power and Problems"	Akintimehin; Robert Searight; Nate Werth; AJ Brown; Dywane Thomas; Sylvester Onyejiaka; Dominique Xavier Taplin; Peter Knudsen; Jonathan Mones; Mike Jelani Brooks; Amir King; Winik	Ghost-Note; OzMoses Arketex	4:36
8.	"Mirroronnabenz" (with Bnyx)	Akintimehin; Benjamin Saint Fort	Bnyx	2:22
9.	"Watching Us" (with Leon Thomas)	Akintimehin; Leon George Thomas III; Mike Hector; Nile Hargrove; Rob Rylan Gueringer; Pharrell Lanscilo Williams; Charles Edward Hugo; Winik	Mike Hector; D. Phelps; Nile Hargrove; Freaky Rob	3:49
10.	"YSF" (with Teni and Seyi Vibez)	Akintimehin; Teniola Apata; Balogun Afolabi Oluwaloseyi; Jeryn Peters; Demilade Akin-Alabi; Emmanuel Ajomale; Winik	Nova; Genio Bambino	2:31
11.	"Tomorrow Today"	Akintimehin; Udoma Peter Kelvin Amba; Kevin Midonzi; Tunji Balogun; Coddaire; Winik	Kel-P; KDaGreat	2:56
12.	"Big Head" (with Odumodublvck)	Akintimehin; Tochukwu Gbubemi Ojogwu; Kevin Andre Price; Winik	Go Grizzly; Dawda; Aladdin	3:18
13.	"City on Fire" (with Odeal)	Akintimehin; Hillary Dennis Udanoh; Richard Olowaranti Mbu Isong	P2J; Cole YoursTruly	2:33
14.	"Fly Away"	Akintimehin; Darius Wooten; Sheryl Ann Padre; Hod David; Reggie Rojo Jr.; Priscilla Renea Hamilton	D.Woo	2:55
15.	"Corner Bottles"	Akintimehin; Goodwin	Legendury Beatz; Mike Hector	2:46
16.	"Like I" (with Andra Day)	Akintimehin; Cassandra Monique Batie; Jacques Pierre; Jahmal Desmond Gwin; Bryan Migal Attmore; Irving Domingo Lorenzo Jr.; Jeffrey Bruce Atkins; Kendred Smith	Jacques Pierre	3:13
17.	"Survive" (with Ty Dolla Sign and Nino Paid)	Akintimehin; Jacquan Andrews; Timothy Bradley McKibbins; Julius Rivera III; Eric Aldwin Bellinger Jr.	Go Grizzly; Cheeze Beatz; Kuttabeatz; B100; Squat Beats; Pooh Beatz; Johnny Winik	3:05
18.	"Lonely" (with Shaboozey)	Akintimehin; Collins Obinna Chibueze; Brian Wall; Winik; Bailey Myown Bryan; Bellinger Jr.; Coddaire; RMR; Goodwin	Brian Wall; Johnny Winick	3:20
Total length:				52:26

== Charts ==
Chart performance for Everything Is a Lot
Chart (2025)	Peak position
US Billboard 200	19
US Top R&B/Hip-Hop Albums (Billboard)	5
