= Mamii =

American singer, songwriter, producer, multi-instrumentalist

- Born: Shawntoni Ajanee Nichols; April 13, 2001 (age 25); Gary, Indiana, United States
- Genres: R&B; soul; jazz; funk rock
- Occupations: Singer; songwriter; producer; multi-instrumentalist
- Label: Roc Nation

Shawntoni Ajanee Nichols, better known by her stage name Mamii, is an American singer, songwriter, record producer and multi-instrumentalist, best known for her contributions to Beyoncé's album Cowboy Carter, Kehlani's album Crash and co-writing ¥$'s single "Talking". She is currently signed to Roc Nation.

In addition to her work behind the scenes, Nichols is also a solo artist blending R&B, jazz, and funk-rock. She is influenced by Prince, Jacob Collier, The Beatles, Stevie Wonder, Amy Winehouse, Frank Ocean, Willow Smith, and more.

== Career ==
=== Early life ===
Nichols grew up in a musical family, and began to learn to show interest in music after her brother started producing beats. A self-taught musician, she eventually learned to play the acoustic guitar and bass from YouTube videos. She started singing as a child in the church choir, and was inspired by the Clark Sisters, Kirk Franklin, and gospel vocal group Take 6.

=== Black Phoenix ===
In 2021, Nichols released her debut major-label project Black Phoenix to critical acclaim. In a review for music publication Clash, writer Amelia Lloyd praised the daring, unconventional genre experimentation and "genre-weaving inspiration[s]". "The creative decisions in the creation of this album are just right. ‘Black Phoeniix’ feels rich and complete, a spectacular offering from a young upcoming creative. Contemporary polyrhythms and textured harmonies take this album from classic R&B to a new level. The youth of the genre are flipping the switch." A deluxe version of the project (titled Black Phoenix: The Rebirth) was released several months later with three additional tracks.

== Discography ==
=== Studio albums ===
- Black Phoenix (2021)
- Black Phoenix: The Rebirth (2021)

=== Extended Plays ===
- 18 (2019)
- Not an EP (2019)
- Phantasmagoria (2024)

=== Guest Appearances ===
Title	Year	Artist	Album
"So Good" (background vocals)	2019	Omar Apollo	Friends
"Nonchalant"	2022	Westside Boogie	More Black Superheroes
"Float"	2022	Westside Boogie	More Black Superheroes
"Somethin Strange" (with Kalan.FrFr)	2022	Westside Boogie	More Black Superheroes
"CYBAH" (with Lucky Daye; background vocals)	2022	Syd	Broken Hearts Club
"Pulp Jam"	2023	Cruza	Paranoia Pack
"Chapel" (background vocals)	2024	Kehlani	Crash
"Dramatic Girl" (featuring Che Ecru; background vocals)	2026	Baby Keem	Casino

=== Selected songwriting & production credits ===
Title	Year	Artist	Album
"Prideful II"	2022	Westside Boogie	More Black Superheroes
"Anthony (War)"	2022	Westside Boogie	More Black Superheroes
"Fast Car"	2022	Syd	Broken Hearts Club
"Sweet"	2022	Syd	Broken Hearts Club
"Out Loud" (featuring Kehlani)	2022	Syd	Broken Hearts Club
"My Rose"	2024	Beyoncé	Cowboy Carter
"Bodyguard"	2024	Beyoncé	Cowboy Carter
"Flamenco"	2024	Beyoncé	Cowboy Carter
"Talking" (featuring North West)	2024	¥$	Vultures 1
"GrooveTheory"	2024	Kehlani	Crash
"Sucia" (featuring Jill Scott and Young Miko)	2024	Kehlani	Crash
"Love Like"	2024	Kehlani	While We Wait 2
"Let Me Down" (San Diego Interlude)	2024	Kehlani	While We Wait 2
"Ballin'"	2024	Kehlani	While We Wait 2
"I Used To" (featuring Baby Rose)	2024	Leon Thomas	Mutt
"Heel"	2025	Leon Thomas	MUTT Deluxe: Heel
"Letter To God"	2026	Ayra Starr	Starr Girl

== Awards and nominations ==
Year	Ceremony	Award	Result	Ref
2025	Canadian Country Music Association	Song of The Year (Bodyguard)	Nominated	
