= Melissa Claire Egan =

American actress

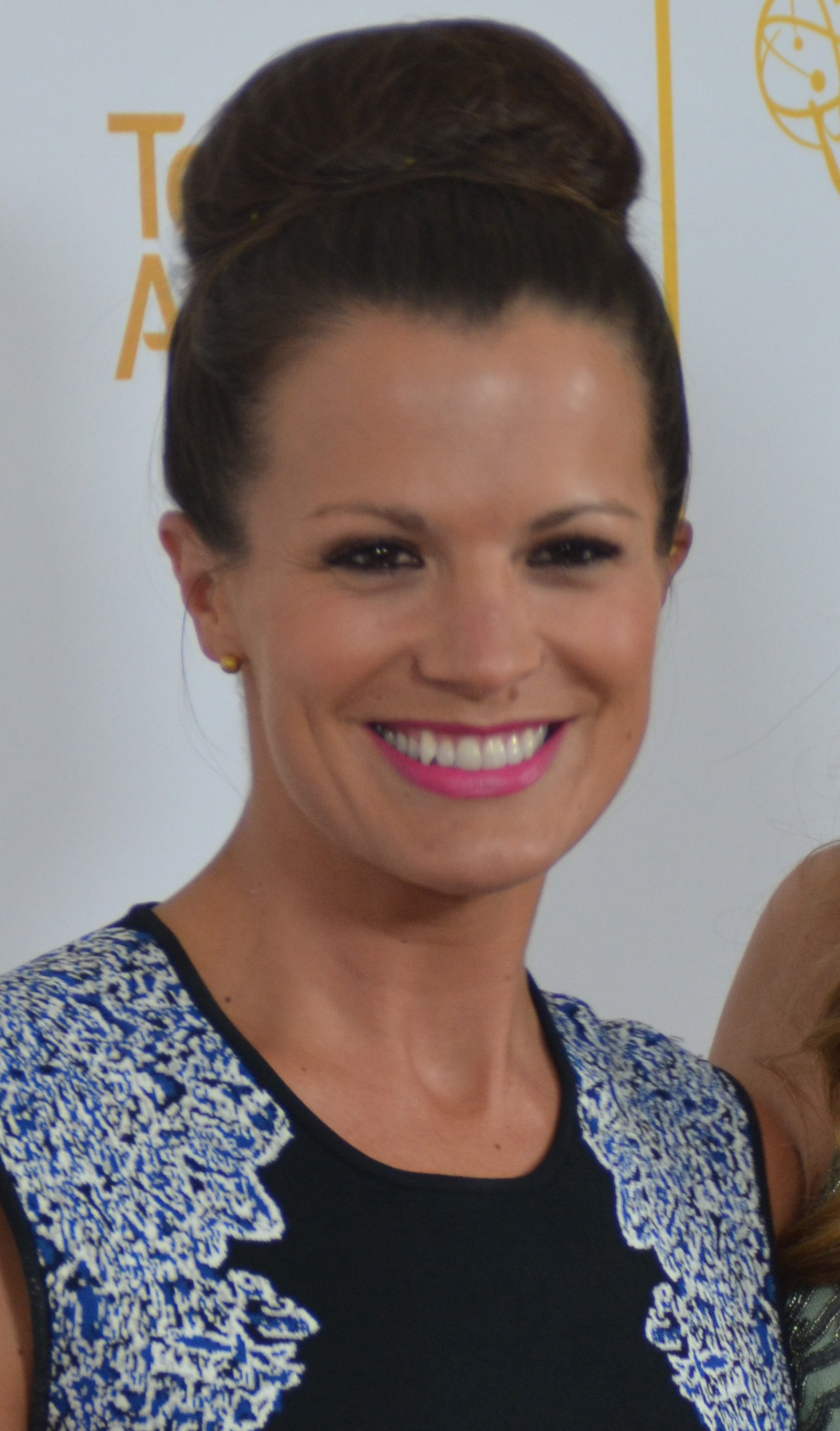
- Egan at the 2014 Daytime Emmy Awards Nominees Cocktail Reception on June 19, 2014
- Born: September 28, 1981 (age 44)
- Education: University of North Carolina at Chapel Hill (BA)
- Occupation: Actress
- Years active: 1995–present
- Spouse: Matt Katrosar (m. 2014)
- Children: 2

Melissa Claire Egan (born September 28, 1981) is an American actress, best known for her roles as Annie Lavery on All My Children and Chelsea Lawson on The Young and the Restless.

== Early years ==
Egan was born to Mary and Dennis Egan, the middle of three children. She has two brothers, Ryan and Scott. She was raised Roman Catholic.

Egan has a Bachelor of Arts in Dramatic Arts degree from the University of North Carolina at Chapel Hill, and she attended the British American Drama Academy in Oxford, England, where she studied Shakespeare.

== Career ==
Egan has guest starred on such television series as Dawson's Creek and One Tree Hill. Her debut film role was as Ali Court in the 2005 movie, Wrestling. On July 10, 2006, she debuted on the daytime soap opera All My Children as a runaway mother Annie Novak Chandler. Coincidentally, one of Egan's first acting appearances was on All My Children at age 12, playing an extra.

Egan guest starred as an exotic dancer on season 6, episode 7 of the CBS drama Criminal Minds.

On January 20, 2011, a statement was released on Egan's Facebook page that she had decided to leave All My Children: "After 4 and a half incredible years as a member of the All My Children cast, I have made the extremely difficult decision to leave the Pine Valley family that I have come to love and respect so much."

Egan returned to All My Children for a three-episode arc to wrap up Annie's storyline with Ryan Lavery and Emma Lavery which culminated on August 5, 2011.

On October 3, 2011, it was announced that Egan had joined The Young and the Restless as a mystery woman, Chelsea Lawson, involved in Billy Abbott's arrest in Myanmar. Her first airdate was November 11, 2011. On January 31, 2018, Egan confirmed earlier reports that she had decided to leave the soap, saying it was a "goodbye for now" on her social media. It was further reported that the door would be left open for the actress to return. In April 2019, it was announced that Egan was reprising her role on the show.

On June 7, 2012, Egan played the role of Milo's date Jessica on TBS sitcom Men at Work.

Egan has served as a celebrity spokesperson for Proactiv Solution with former AMC co-star Chrishell Stause.

== Personal life ==
In February 2013, she became engaged to Matt Katrosar. The couple were wed on July 26, 2014, in an interfaith service in Santa Barbara, California as Egan is Catholic and Katrosar is Jewish. In August 2021, Egan gave birth to the couple's first child, a son, after experiencing two miscarriages. In early 2023, it was revealed that Egan was pregnant with the couple's second child.

== Filmography ==
Year	Title	Role	Notes
2001	Dawson's Creek	Ilyse Todd	Episode: "Use Your Disillusion"
2003	Dawson's Creek	Waitress	Episode: "Catch-22"
2003	One Tree Hill	Melody / Lori	Episodes: "Pilot" and "Life in a Glass House"
2006–11	All My Children	Annie Lavery	Role held: July 10, 2006 – August 5, 2011
2008	Wrestling	Ali Court	Movie
2009	My Father's Will	Laura	Movie
2010	Criminal Minds	Tara Dice	Episode: "Middle Man"
2011–18, 2019–present	The Young and the Restless	Chelsea Lawson	Contract role
2012	Men at Work	Jessia	Episode: "Heterotextual Male"
2012	Bones	Pamela Bartlett	Episode: "The Partners in the Divorce"
2013	Somewhere Slow	Claire	Movie
2013	The Last Session	Brailey Honeycutt	Short
2013	We Are Men	Rachel	Episode: "We Are Carter's Dad Visits"
2015	Misguided	Missy	Episode: "The Actresses"
2019	Holiday for Heroes	Audrey Brown	TV movie

== Awards and nominations ==
List of acting awards and nominations
Year	Award	Category	Title	Result	Ref.
2009	Daytime Emmy Award	Outstanding Supporting Actress in a Drama Series	All My Children	Nominated	
2011	Daytime Emmy Award	Outstanding Supporting Actress in a Drama Series	All My Children	Nominated	
2012	Daytime Emmy Award	Outstanding Supporting Actress in a Drama Series	All My Children	Nominated	
2013	Daytime Emmy Award	Outstanding Supporting Actress in a Drama Series	The Young and the Restless	Nominated	
2014	Daytime Emmy Award	Outstanding Supporting Actress in a Drama Series	The Young and the Restless	Nominated	
2016	Indie Series Award	Best Guest Actress — Comedy	Misguided	Nominated	
2016	Soap Awards France	Best New Character	The Young and the Restless	Won	
2017	Soap Awards France	Couple of the Year — "Chelsea and Adam" (shared with Michael Muhney)	The Young and the Restless	Nominated	
2021	Daytime Emmy Award	Outstanding Lead Actress in a Drama Series	The Young and the Restless	Nominated	
2023	Daytime Emmy Award	Outstanding Lead Actress in a Drama Series	The Young and the Restless	Nominated	
2025	Daytime Emmy Award	Outstanding Lead Actress in a Drama Series	The Young and the Restless	Nominated	
