= Somewhere Slow =

- Directed by: Jeremy O'Keefe
- Written by: Jeremy O'Keefe
- Produced by: Christopher Sepulveda; Michael Anderson
- Starring: Jessalyn Gilsig; Graham Patrick Martin; David Costabile; Wallace Langham; Robert Forster; Lindsay Crouse
- Production companies: Logolite Entertainment; Lady in the Tree Productions
- Distributed by: Screen Media Films
- Release dates: March 2, 2013 (Cinequest); January 31, 2014 (United States)
- Country: United States
- Language: English

Somewhere Slow is a 2013 American romantic crime drama film written and directed by Jeremy O'Keefe. It stars Jessalyn Gilsig, Graham Patrick Martin, David Costabile, Wallace Langham, Robert Forster and Lindsay Crouse. It had its world premiere at the 2013 Cinequest Film Festival and won Best Narrative Feature at the 2013 Brooklyn Film Festival.

The film was produced by Christopher Sepulveda and Michael Anderson of Logolite Entertainment, Jessalyn Gilsig's Lady in the Tree Productions and Jeremy O'Keefe's Tax-Free Films. The film was acquired by Screen Media Films and was released in the United States beginning on January 31, 2014.

== Plot ==
In Wilmington, Delaware, Anna Thompson sells beauty products to doctors but her company lets her go when her performance is not up to par. She is a chain smoker and bulimic and feels the need to run away from her life. When she narrowly misses being the victim of an armed robbery in a store, she gets on a bus and travels to where her family used to have a vacation cottage in Massachusetts. Along the way she meets Travis (who calls himself Danny), who is also running away from his problems.

== Cast ==
- David Costabile as Robert Thompson
- Jessalyn Gilsig as Anna Thompson
- Graham Patrick Martin as Travis Tratten
- Robert Forster as Chris Mc Conville
- Wallace Langham as Paul
- Lindsay Crouse as Katherine Franklin
- Melissa Claire Egan as Claire
- Denise Grayson as Dr. Diane Garland
- Blaise Godbe Lipman as Reilly Lewes
- Clifford Banagale as Sunshine
