= Jeremy O'Keefe =

American film director

Jeremy O'Keefe is an American filmmaker. His debut film, Wrestling, was released in 2008. His short film, CLOSURE, was an Official Selection at the Frameline Festival, Southwest Gay and Lesbian Film Festival, the Hollywood Attack of the 50 Foot Reels Film Festival, the Festival Mix Milano and the North Carolina Gay & Lesbian Film Festival. His next film, "Somewhere Slow" starring Jessalyn Gilsig, of "Glee (TV Series)", who was also one of the film's producers won the Best Narrative Feature prize at the 2013 Brooklyn Film Festival and was released theatrically on January 31, 2014.

Jeannette Catsoulis of The New York Times wrote that Somewhere Slow 'is about feeling unknown. Tapping into the near-universal desire for reinvention, Mr. O’Keefe gives us a well-worn story that somehow avoids glaring clichés or forced melodrama.'
