= The Bill Engvall Show =

American sitcom, 2007 to 2009

- Created by: Bill Engvall; Michael Leeson
- Starring: Bill Engvall; Nancy Travis; Steve Hytner; Jennifer Lawrence; Graham Patrick Martin; Skyler Gisondo; Tim Meadows
- Composer: Jonathan Flood
- Country of origin: United States
- Original language: English
- No. of seasons: 3
- No. of episodes: 30

Production
- Camera setup: Multi-camera
- Running time: 23 minutes
- Production companies: Welladay, Inc. (2007) (season 1); Parallel Entertainment; TBS Productions

Original release
- Network: TBS
- Release: July 17, 2007 – September 5, 2009

The Bill Engvall Show is an American sitcom that ran on TBS from July 17, 2007, to September 5, 2009. The series starred comedian Bill Engvall and was written and created by Engvall and Michael Leeson. The series was canceled on September 25, 2009.

Set in suburban Louisville, Colorado, Engvall played a family counselor called Bill Pearson who cannot always understand his own family. Nancy Travis co-starred as his wife and Tim Meadows played his best friend. The Pearson children were portrayed by Jennifer Lawrence, Graham Patrick Martin, and Skyler Gisondo.

== Plot ==
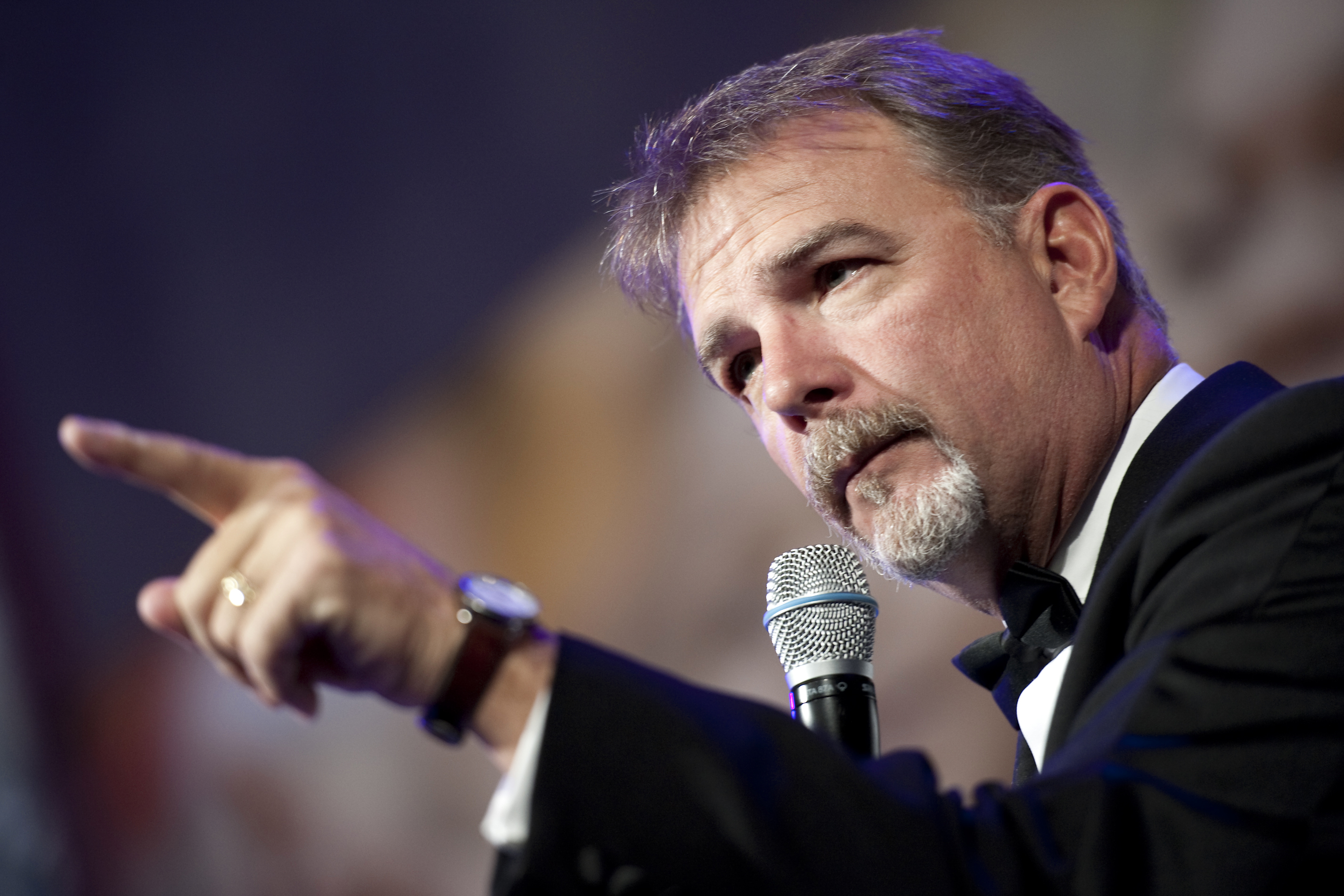
Engvall in 2010

The show focuses on parenting issues like allowance controversies, driver's licenses, parking tickets and larger issues like raising responsible children. The Pearsons also try to keep the spark alive in their marriage and balance work with family life.

Bill Pearson is a family counselor who's just struggling to understand his own children. There's his wife, Susan Pearson, who is a stay-at-home mom determined to keep her family in line, his son, Trent Pearson who's attempting to live a good life while trying to live up to his father's hopes, their daughter, Lauren Pearson, who is struggling between the choices of going with her parents' wishes or being rebellious and defying them, and then Bill's son, Bryan Pearson, who is constantly in trouble for such things as his pet snake getting loose.

Bill works in the same building as his closest friend, Paul Dufrayne (Meadows). Paul is a hair-replacement specialist who is treated like part of the Pearson family (the kids refer to him as 'Uncle Paul').

== Characters ==
| Actor | Character | Description |
|---|---|---|
| Bill Engvall | Bill Pearson | A family counselor whose family needs some help as well. |
| Nancy Travis | Susan Pearson (née Murray) | Bill's witty and loving wife. She always tries to keep the family together. |
| Steve Hytner | Bob Spoonerman | Bill's best friend. |
| Jennifer Lawrence | Lauren Pearson | Bill and Susan's daughter. She is the oldest and is the leader when the kids scheme and plan. |
| Graham Patrick Martin | Trent Pearson | Bill and Susan's older son. He lacks common sense, although he proves to be intelligent in rare occasions. |
| Skyler Gisondo | Bryan Pearson | Bill and Susan's younger son. A bit on the "odd" side, Bryan loves to show off his vast knowledge of strange and unusual facts. This naturally makes him the target of his siblings' jokes. |
| Tim Meadows | Paul Dufrayne | One of Bill's best friends since the 1980s. Originally he wanted to be a doctor, as seen in the episode "How Bill Met Susan", but ended up opening a hair transplant practice located in the same building as Bill. |
| Brian Doyle-Murray | Mr. Faulkner (recurring) | The Pearsons' gruff and crotchety neighbor. He likes to give Bill a hard time but has a soft spot for Susan. It is revealed his first name is Ernest. |
| Cynthia Watros | A.J. (recurring) | Susan's best friend. A.J. currently lives in a "vanabago" and has been known to park it in the Pearson family's driveway from time to time. |

== Episodes ==
=== Series overview ===
| Season | Episodes | Originally released | |
| Season | Episodes | First released | Last released |
|---|---|---|---|
| 1 | 8 | July 17, 2007 | September 4, 2007 |
| 2 | 12 | June 12, 2008 | November 15, 2008 |
| 3 | 10 | July 18, 2009 | September 5, 2009 |

=== Season 1 (2007) ===
| No. overall | No. in season | Title | Directed by | Written by | Original release date |
|---|---|---|---|---|---|
| 1 | 1 | "Good People" | James Widdoes | Bill Engvall, Michael Leeson, Mark Kunerth & Chloe Leeson | July 17, 2007 |
Trent, the third-string quarterback ends up as the starting quarterback and Bill struggles trying to help the boy improve his skills. Bill goes a little too far, beating the child with a belt, and Trent decides he does not want his dad at the game. Meanwhile, Lauren wants to get her belly button pierced.
| 2 | 2 | "Aloha, Raffles" | James Widdoes | Bill Engvall, Michael Leeson, Kathy Ann Stumpe & Chloe Leeson | July 24, 2007 |
Bill plans to take the family on vacation to Hawaii. When he discovers that the family dog, Raffles, is sick, the family must decide whether or not to try an expensive surgery. The kids try to help raise money to save Raffles in an unconventional way.
| 3 | 3 | "How Bill Met Susan" | James Widdoes | Bill Engvall, Michael Leeson, Kathy Ann Stumpe & Chloe Leeson | July 31, 2007 |
To celebrate their 18th wedding anniversary, Susan gets Bill tickets to a Broncos game. Their plans are derailed, however, after Bill reveals that when he and Susan first started dating, he was also seeing another woman.
| 4 | 4 | "Have You Seen My Muffins, Man?" | James Widdoes | Bill Engvall, Michael Leeson, Kathy Ann Stumpe & Chloe Leeson | August 7, 2007 |
Susan decides she wants to sell her muffins to make some extra money, and Bill tries his best to support her even though he is not thrilled with the idea due to severe financial problems. Bryan works on his rocket for the science fair with the goal to beat one of his friends.
| 5 | 5 | "Feel Free To Say No" | James Widdoes | Bill Engvall, Michael Leeson & Chloe Leeson | August 14, 2007 |
Bill and Susan have many issues to address in their home. Trent is having trouble in school, Bryan's pet snake got loose and Lauren gets into a minor car accident.
| 6 | 6 | "Jealous Guy" | James Widdoes | Bill Engvall, Michael Leeson & Heide Perlman & Chloe Leeson | August 21, 2007 |
Susan informs Bill that they need some more "us time", but when Bill tries to use Paul's advice and tries to take Susan to a Chris Isaak concert, Susan declines because she had a relationship with Chris Isaak in college.
| 7 | 7 | "The Birthday" | James Widdoes | Bill Engvall, Michael Leeson, Taylor Hamra & Chloe Leeson | August 28, 2007 |
Bill is celebrating his 46th birthday with the family. Bill is hoping for a motorcycle, but is surprised by his actual gift. Lauren works on getting a fake ID to get into a club.
| 8 | 8 | "Go Ahead, See If I Karaoke" | James Widdoes | Bill Engvall, Michael Leeson & Chloe Leeson | September 4, 2007 |
Bill takes Susan out with friends to sing karaoke and someone has a little too much to drink. Lauren meets a new boy that Bill does not like.

=== Season 2 (2008) ===
| No. overall | No. in season | Title | Directed by | Written by | Original release date |
|---|---|---|---|---|---|
| 9 | 1 | "But, That's Not Fair" | James Widdoes | Mark Kunerth | June 12, 2008 |
Bill and Susan do not believe that their kids are earning their allowances. To rectify the situation, they make the kids clean the garage for free. The kids respond by going on strike. Meanwhile, Bill struggles with the cell phone company.
| 10 | 2 | "Ask Your Mother" | James Widdoes | Kathy Ann Stumpe | June 19, 2008 |
Bill decides to become more involved at home when he discovers that his kids go to their mother for everything. But the plan backfires when Bill lets Lauren go to the mall with a shoplifter, so he decides to make a grid, actually a chart, of all the things the kids do, but he "quits" when it gets too complicated. Meanwhile, Paul has more lady troubles.
| 11 | 3 | "No Gifts, Please" | James Widdoes | Carla Banks Waddles | June 26, 2008 |
Susan breaks her "no gift" policy, leaving Bill with a terrible surprise and a guilty conscience. Trent cannot sleep so the family tries to make him go to sleep earlier.
| 12 | 4 | "Pineblock Derby" | James Widdoes | Taylor Hamra | July 3, 2008 |
Bill agrees to help Bryan build a car for the pineblock derby, but things backfire when Bill and Bryan are disqualified from "The Pine Block Derby" because Bill lied to Bryan that he built the car, and it turns out that Uncle Paul put petrol in the car to make it go faster. Meanwhile, Lauren's new friend takes a liking to Trent. At first, Lauren steps back on their friendship, but then when she learns from her friend that Trent is being "used", it is time for Lauren to step in.
| 13 | 5 | "Susan's Best Friend" | James Widdoes | Christopher Vane | July 10, 2008 |
Susan's sister, who has a wild side, comes for a visit; Bill worries that he and Susan are in a rut.
| 14 | 6 | "Bill Talks a Good Game" | James Widdoes | Bill Engvall, Michael Leeson & Dave Caplan | July 17, 2008 |
While Bill and Trent are playing a "Father and Son" game of basketball, Bill discovers that Trent can beat him at it. Trent is talking to Bill about his problem at school but Bill does not even listen because he is trying to prove something to himself. Meanwhile, Susan feels left out when Lauren and "Aunt" AJ start spending more time together, really connecting with each other.
| 15 | 7 | "Snoop, Dog" | James Widdoes | Bill Engvall, Michael Leeson & Maria Ferrari | July 24, 2008 |
After Trent seems to lie to Bill and Susan, they snoop around his room to find out more information about a party they think he might be going to where alcohol will be served. Meanwhile, Raffles hides under Faulkner’s house and the family tries to figure out a way to get him out.
| 16 | 8 | "Dream Lover" | James Widdoes | Bill Engvall, Michael Leeson & Christopher Vane | July 31, 2008 |
Susan has an accurate premonition that Bill will get involved in an affair with a woman named Penelope; Trent wants to get practice time to prepare for his driver's test.
| 17 | 9 | "A Reptile Dysfunction" | James Widdoes | Kathy Ann Stumpe | August 7, 2008 |
Paul asks Bryan and Trent to watch his precious iguana terrarium while he watches them; Lauren gets a job to earn enough money to buy a designer purse.
| 18 | 10 | "Promzilla" | James Widdoes | Carla Banks Waddles | August 7, 2008 |
Susan goes a little overboard when helping Lauren with her prom and Bill is a little suspicious of their growing relationship. Meanwhile, Trent comes up with ideas on how to become famous on the Internet with the help of Bryan.
| 19 | 11 | "The Night Before Christmas" | James Widdoes | Taylor Hamra | November 15, 2008 |
When the kids do not show an interest in the upcoming Christmas holiday, Bill tries to show them the true meaning of Christmas.
| 20 | 12 | "Honey Do" | James Widdoes | Mark Kunerth | November 15, 2008 |
When Susan begins to fix things around the house, Bill gets threatened by it and tries to regain his "power" as the man of the house whilst also battling erectile problems. Meanwhile, the kids must decide who gets the money that is collected in the coin bottle.

=== Season 3 (2009) ===
| No. overall | No. in season | Title | Directed by | Written by | Original release date |
|---|---|---|---|---|---|
| 21 | 1 | "Give Me a Break" | James Widdoes | Bill Engvall, Michael Leeson & Dave Caplan | July 18, 2009 |
With money getting tight, Bill must tell Lauren that the family cannot afford her spring break trip. Meanwhile, Paul must explain how he lost all of Trent's baby pictures.
| 22 | 2 | "You Decide" | James Widdoes | Bill Engvall, Michael Leeson & Hayes Jackson | July 18, 2009 |
Bill realizes that he is being aggressively manipulated by Susan and decides to do something about it. Trent, meanwhile, tries too hard to impress a girl and, with Bryan and Lauren's help, winds up joining her on a mock United Nations delegation representing India where his racist interpretation leaves a few faces red. Bill and Susan get an eyeful when their neighbor, Mr. Faulkner (guest star Brian Doyle-Murray), decides to indulge in his new hot tub au naturale.
| 23 | 3 | "Let It Go" | James Widdoes | Bill Engvall, Michael Leeson & Mark Kunerth | July 25, 2009 |
Bill gets upset when he finds out Susan and her friends discuss their husbands during their girls-only game night, and he is determined to find out what has been said about him. Meanwhile, Bryan struggles to accept his first B on a science test, so Lauren convinces him this is the beginning of what will surely be a steady decline in his IQ and uses it to her advantage to tease her little brother.
| 24 | 4 | "The Way We Were" | James Widdoes | Bill Engvall, Michael Leeson & Jennifer Fisher | August 1, 2009 |
When Susan tells Bill she misses the excitement of young love, he decides to revive that feeling by recreating the best moments from their dating days. While they are out, Lauren and Trent have to babysit Bryan, but they each have dates to go see a movie. The only solution is to take him to the movies as well, which is a great plan until Bryan disappears. NASCAR driver Carl Edwards guest-stars.
| 25 | 5 | "Oh, Brother" | James Widdoes | Bill Engvall, Michael Leeson & Christopher Vane | August 8, 2009 |
Bill invests a hefty chunk of money in his brother Danny's latest sure-thing business proposition, something he has done too many times before. Determined to put a stop to it, Susan pushes Bill to talk to his brother about being a responsible adult. Meanwhile, when Trent and Lauren get into a feud over a pen, Bryan pulls a Yojimbo by playing his siblings against each other for his own gain. Stephen Dunham (The Mummy) guest-stars.
| 26 | 6 | "I Like It That Way" | James Widdoes | Bill Engvall, Michael Leeson & Maria Ferrari | August 15, 2009 |
When Bill refuses to shave his beard after a fishing trip, Susan decides to teach him a painful lesson, and Paul winds up in the crossfire. Meanwhile, Bryan tries to join Trent in tormenting Lauren, but it is unclear that he has what it takes to be a prankster.
| 27 | 7 | "The Coffee Maker" | James Widdoes | Bill Engvall, Michael Leeson & Taylor Hamra | August 22, 2009 |
Now that Bill's brother Danny has hit it big, he has been showering Bill's family with gifts. Bill disapproves of what he believes to be Danny's attempt at buying their love. Paul makes a donation to the school's silent auction and winds up with a crushed ego.
| 28 | 8 | "United Front" | James Widdoes | Bill Engvall, Michael Leeson & Mark Kunerth | August 29, 2009 |
Susan grounds Lauren for lying to her but then is surprised to learn that Bill thinks the punishment is too strong. Meanwhile Paul enlists the aid of Bryan and Trent to create an online profile that will make him look good to the ladies.
| 29 | 9 | "Car Trouble" | James Widdoes | Bill Engvall, Michael Leeson & Christopher Vane | September 5, 2009 |
After Trent earns enough money to buy a car, Bill decides to help him pick out just the right vehicle. His research does not produce the results that Trent wants. Bryan has problems dealing with a school bully.
| 30 | 10 | "Trash Talk" | Shelley Jensen | Bill Engvall, Michael Leeson & Carla Banks Waddles | September 5, 2009 |
Bill and Susan get into a violent feud with a new neighbor over trashcans on the curb, but Bill goes a little overboard in his tactics, especially when Paul decides to get involved. Meanwhile, Trent fails his driving test, and he is convinced it is because he lost his lucky red quarter.

== International broadcasters ==
- Nine Network Primary Channel – Australia
- Super Channel – Canada
- Kanal 7 – Denmark
- TV1 – Lithuania
- Dubai One – Middle East and North Africa
- TV2 – New Zealand
- TVNorge – Norway
- TV Slovenija 2 – Slovenia
- TV3 – Sweden
- Novyi Kanal – Ukraine

== Home media ==
The first season of The Bill Engvall Show was released on DVD on May 20, 2008. Bonus features include an overview of the show, a set tour, interviews with the cast and an "Ask Bill" segment. Beginning January 22, 2013, Warner Archive released seasons 2 & 3 together in one set, completing the series on DVD.
