= Bodyguard (Beyoncé song) =

2024 song by Beyoncé

Song by Beyoncé

from the album Cowboy Carter
- Released: March 29, 2024
- Studio: The Sound Factory (Los Angeles, CA); Westlake Recording Studios (Hollywood, CA)
- Genre: Soft rock; pop; country pop
- Length: 4:00
- Label: Parkwood; Columbia
- Songwriters: Beyoncé; Elizabeth Lowell Boland; Leven Kali; Raphael Saadiq; Ryan Beatty; Shawntoni Ajanae Nichols
- Producer: Raphael Saadiq

Lyric video
- "Bodyguard" on YouTube

"Bodyguard" is a song by American singer Beyoncé. It is the eighth track on her eighth studio album, Cowboy Carter (2024), which was released on March 29, 2024, through Parkwood Entertainment and Columbia Records as an album track. At the 67th Annual Grammy Awards, the song was nominated for Best Pop Solo Performance, becoming Beyoncé's third nomination in the category.

== Composition ==
The line ‘Sometimes I hold you closer just to know you’re real’ is one of my favorite lines I wrote for the whole record. Melody and lyric together can make something feel so much more beautiful. I think that melody, the way she sings it, and the line itself feels cute and intimate. I love that part of the song.

— Ryan Beatty, a co-writer of the song, speaking to Billboard the month after the album's release.

The song was written by Beyoncé herself with Elizabeth Lowell Boland, Shawntoni Ajanae Nichols, Leven Kali, Ryan Beatty, and Raphael Saadiq, who also produced the song. Critics described the song as a country pop, with elements form R&B and soft rock, with music influence from British-American rock band Fleetwood Mac.

== Critical reception ==
The song received rave reviews from critics after the album release and was considered one of the best songs of 2024. Michael Cragg of The Guardian defined the song "excellent", which "unspools like a lost Fleetwood Mac classic, all rippling 70s soft-rock melodies". Chelsey Sanchez of Harper's Bazaar described the song as "a bouncy dance anthem that illustrates her desire to protect and care for her lover".

Dan Rys, ranking the best songs of 2024 for Billboard, wrote that "Bodyguard" is "maybe musically the simplest though also the most engaging" song of the album, in which "Beyoncé's vocals really begin to soar, which elevates the song beyond what it could have been in anyone else's hands".

Select year-end rankings of Bodyguard
Publication	List	Rank	Ref.
Billboard	The 100 Best Songs of 2024	7	
The Independent	The 20 Best Songs of 2024	4	
New York Post	The 10 Best Songs of 2024	8	

== Promo video ==
On November 5, 2024, Beyonce released a video for the song, the first full performance visuals featuring the singer for her music since her release of I'm That Girl in 2022.

The video, alternately titled "Beywatch", pays homage to actress and model Pamela Anderson, with Beyonce dressed in three costumes worn by Anderson: the first one referencing Anderson's role as C. J. Parker in Baywatch (1992–1997), the second one referencing her role as Barb Wire in Barb Wire (1996), and the third one referencing her outfit at the 1999 MTV Video Music Awards. The video ends after the second verse, with white text on a black background saying "Happy Beyloween" and encouraging viewers to "Vote", as the video was released on Election Day in the United States.

Anderson told Variety that she had been unaware of Beyoncé's homage prior to its release. In August 2025 on Watch What Happens Live with Andy Cohen, Anderson told Cohen that she did not know that Beyoncé knew who she was.

== Commercial performance ==
Upon the album release, the song debuted and peaked at number 26 on the Billboard Hot 100.

== Live performances ==
Beyoncé performed "Bodyguard" for the first time during the Cowboy Carter Tour.

== Accolades ==
Awards and nominations for "Bodyguard"
Organization	Year	Category	Result	Ref.
Grammy Awards	2025	Best Pop Solo Performance	Nominated	
Canadian Country Music Association	2025	Songwriter(s) of the Year	Nominated	

== Charts ==
Chart performance for "Bodyguard"
Chart (2024)	Peak position
Brazil Hot 100 (Billboard)	89
Canada Hot 100 (Billboard)	40
France (SNEP)	81
Global 200 (Billboard)	19
Portugal (AFP)	54
US Billboard Hot 100	26

== Certifications ==
Certifications for "Bodyguard"
Region	Certification	Certified units/sales
Brazil (Pro-Música Brasil)	Platinum	40,000^{‡}
^{‡} Sales+streaming figures based on certification alone.
