= Mutt (Leon Thomas song) =

2024 single by Leon Thomas

Single by Leon Thomas

from the album Mutt
- Released: August 8, 2024
- Genre: R&B; soul
- Length: 3:13: 3:20 (remix with Chris Brown)
- Label: EZMNY; Motown
- Songwriters: Leon Thomas III; Lazaro Camejo; David Phelps; Robert Gueringer
- Producers: D. Phelps; Gueringer; Michael Stokes

Leon Thomas singles chronology
| "Dangerous Game" (2024) | "Mutt" (2024) | "Far Fetched" (2024) |

Remix cover
- Cover art of the official remix with Freddie Gibbs

Music video
- "Mutt" (remix) on YouTube

"Mutt" (stylized in all caps) is a song by American singer Leon Thomas, released on August 8, 2024, as the lead single from his second studio album (2024). It was produced by D. Phelps, Robert Gueringer and Michael Stokes. Two official remixes have been released, one with American rapper Freddie Gibbs on August 30, 2024, and the other with American singer Chris Brown on March 21, 2025. It peaked at number 6 on the Billboard Hot 100 chart, becoming Thomas's first top ten hit.

== Background ==
Leon Thomas stated in an interview with Rated R&B:

The album Mutt was created shortly after a significant break-up. During the relationship, my ex had given me a dog, and as I started working on the album in my new home, I began to notice similarities between my dog's behavior and my own. My puppy had never received formal training, and his behavior inspired the song I was writing. It made me think about the give and take in relationships, and the struggle for obedience. My dog is not a pure breed; he's a mutt. While writing the title track for my album, I came up with the theme for this collection of songs. Even though my dog may sometimes make a mess in the house or bark loudly at the neighbors, I know he means well. This became a metaphor for not being a perfect partner but having good intentions.

Thomas wrote the song in 2022, on his living room floor while microdosing psychedelic drugs and watching his dog and cat fight.

== Composition ==
"Mutt" is an R&B and soul ballad with drums and bass. The song's primary melody interpolating "Silly Love Song" by Enchantment, Leon Thomas sings about being ready to take another chance at love, even if he would end up breaking his heart.

== Live performances ==
On February 7, 2025, Leon Thomas performed the song on The Late Show with Stephen Colbert. Thomas also performed the song live on June 9, 2025, at the 2025 BET Awards. Thomas performed the song at a February 2025 Tiny Desk Concert, releasing the live version as a single on August 9, 2025.

== Charts ==
=== Weekly charts ===
Weekly chart performance for "Mutt"
| Chart (2025–2026) | Peak position |
|---|---|
| Australia (ARIA) | 19 |
| Australia Hip Hop/R&B (ARIA) | 3 |
| Canada (Canadian Hot 100) | 41 |
| Canada CHR/Top 40 (Billboard) | 8 |
| Canada Hot AC (Billboard) | 36 |
| Colombia Anglo Airplay (Monitor Latino) | 8 |
| Global 200 (Billboard) | 28 |
| Ireland (IRMA) | 51 |
| Lithuania Airplay (TopHit) | 62 |
| Malaysia (Billboard) | 22 |
| Malaysia International Streaming (RIM) | 15 |
| Mexico Anglo Airplay (Monitor Latino) | 18 |
| Netherlands (Single Top 100) | 75 |
| New Zealand (Recorded Music NZ) | 2 |
| Philippines (Philippines Hot 100) | 23 |
| Singapore (RIAS) | 28 |
| South Africa Airplay (TOSAC) | 16 |
| South Africa Streaming (TOSAC) | 19 |
| UK Singles (Official Charts) | 17 |
| UK Hip Hop/R&B (Official Charts) | 1 |
| US Billboard Hot 100 | 6 |
| US Adult Pop Airplay (Billboard) | 16 |
| US Hot R&B/Hip-Hop Songs (Billboard) | 1 |
| US R&B/Hip-Hop Airplay (Billboard) | 1 |
| US Pop Airplay (Billboard) | 4 |
| US Rhythmic (Billboard) | 1 |

=== Monthly charts ===
Monthly chart performance for "Mutt"
| Chart (2025) | Peak position |
|---|---|
| Lithuania Airplay (TopHit) | 79 |

=== Year-end charts ===
Year-end chart performance for "Mutt"
| Chart (2025) | Position |
|---|---|
| Australia (ARIA) | 57 |
| Canada (Canadian Hot 100) | 92 |
| Global 200 (Billboard) | 124 |
| New Zealand (Recorded Music NZ) | 12 |
| UK Singles (OCC) | 100 |
| US Billboard Hot 100 | 22 |
| US Hot R&B/Hip-Hop Songs (Billboard) | 6 |
| US Hot R&B/Hip-Hop Airplay (Billboard) | 3 |
| US Rhythmic (Billboard) | 2 |

== Certifications ==
Certifications for "Mutt"
| Region | Certification | Certified units/sales |
|---|---|---|
| Australia (ARIA) | 2× Platinum | 140,000^{‡} |
| Brazil (Pro-Música Brasil) | Platinum | 40,000^{‡} |
| New Zealand (RMNZ) | Platinum | 30,000^{‡} |
| United Kingdom (BPI) | Platinum | 600,000^{‡} |
| United States (RIAA) | 2× Platinum | 2,000,000^{‡} |
^{‡} Sales+streaming figures based on certification alone.

== Release history ==
Release dates and formats for "Mutt"
| Region | Date | Format(s) | Version | Label(s) | Ref. |
|---|---|---|---|---|---|
| Various | August 8, 2024 | Digital download; streaming | Original | EZMNY; Motown | |
| United States | April 8, 2025 | Rhythmic contemporary radio | Chris Brown remix | EZMNY; Motown | |
| United States | June 24, 2025 | Contemporary hit radio | Chris Brown remix | EZMNY; Motown | |
