= Graham Patrick Martin =

American actor

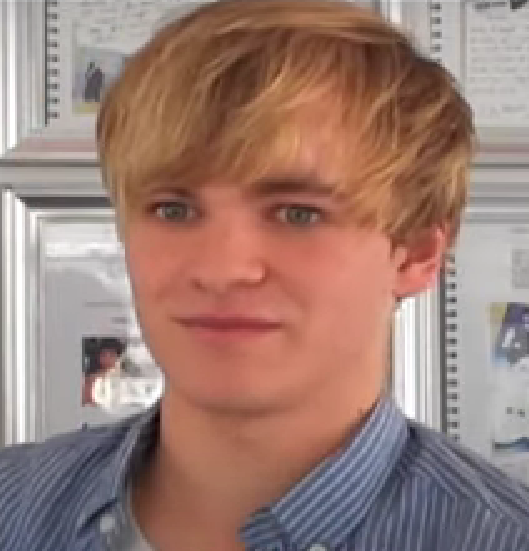
- Born: November 14, 1991 (age 34); Metairie, Louisiana, U.S.
- Occupation: Actor
- Years active: 2006–present

Graham Patrick Martin (born November 14, 1991) is an American actor. He is best known for his recurring role as Eldridge on Two and a Half Men (2010–2012) and former teen hustler Rusty Beck on the series finale of The Closer and in its spin-off series, Major Crimes (2012–2018). Martin also portrayed Bill Engvall's older son in the sitcom The Bill Engvall Show (2007–2009). He starred in the films Jack Ketchum's The Girl Next Door (2007) and Rising Stars (2010).

== Personal life ==
Martin attended Fiorello H. LaGuardia High School in New York City. When asked, in a TNT Newsroom interview, to describe himself, he responded: "I'm a New Yorker from New Orleans who lives in Los Angeles."

When asked what inspired him to act, Martin shared that his older sister was the first in his family to become interested in acting. Martin, his two brothers and sister attended a performing arts summer camp called French Woods, where:

I went for the water sports and horseback riding, but I somehow ended up auditioning for my first play while I was there. I was eight years old at the time, and I was cast in my first musical The King and I. I did three musicals every summer at French Woods, until I was fifteen. The other influence was Leonardo DiCaprio. I saw Titanic in kindergarten and decided I wanted to be just like him.

== Filmography ==
Film
Year	Title	Role	Notes
2007	The Girl Next Door	Willie Chandler, Jr.	
2010	Rising Stars	Garrett	
2011	Monster of the House	Jamie	
2013	Somewhere Slow	Travis Tratten	
2014	The Girlfriend Experience	Max	Short film
2022	Pursuit	John Diego	
2023	The Line	Connor Murphy	
2023	A Southern Haunting	Taran	
2024	You Can't Run Forever	Deputy Dwyer	

Television
Year	Title	Role	Notes
2006	Law & Order: Criminal Intent	Benjamin Price	Episode: "To the Bone"
2007–2009	The Bill Engvall Show	Trent Pearson	Main cast
2009	iCarly	Pete	Episode: "iMake Sam Girlier"
2009	Jonas	Randolph	Episode: "Love Sick"
2010–2012	Two and a Half Men	Eldridge McElroy	Recurring role (Seasons 7–9)
2011	Good Luck Charlie	Dustin	Episode: "Baby's New Shoes"
2012	The Closer	Rusty Beck	Episode: "The Last Word"
2012–2018	Major Crimes	Rusty Beck	Main cast
2013	The Anna Nicole Story	Daniel Wayne Smith	TV movie
2015	Impastor	Jasper Simmons	Episode: "Genesis"
2018	The Good Doctor	Blake	Episode: "More"
2019	Catch-22	Orr	Miniseries, main cast
2020	All Rise	Jeremy Moore	Episode: "What the Constitution Greens to Me"
2020	S.W.A.T.	Dylan	Episode: "Hopeless Sinners"
2020	The Rookie	Elvis Grimaldi	Episode "Under the Gun"
2022	NCIS: Los Angeles	Pilot Joseph Landry	Episode: "Murmuration"
2023	Quantum Leap	Sean Egan	Episode: "Ben & Teller"
2024–2025	Law & Order: Special Victims Unit	Chris Becker	2 episodes
