= Talking / Once Again =

2024 single by Kanye West and Ty Dolla Sign

Single by ¥$ featuring North West

from the album Vultures 1
- Released: February 8, 2024
- Genre: Hip-hop; Jersey club
- Length: 3:06
- Label: YZY
- Songwriters: Ye; Tyrone Griffin, Jr.; Anthony Clemons Jr.; Cydel Young; Darhyl Camper, Jr.; Dominic Maker; Edward Davadi; Ernest Wilson; James Litherland; Kasseem Dean; North West; Quentin Miller; Shawntoni Nichols
- Producers: Ye; Ty Dolla Sign; Camper; Dom Maker; Edsclusive; James Blake; No I.D.; Swizz Beatz

¥$ singles chronology
"Vultures" (2023)	"Talking / Once Again" (2024)	"Carnival" (2024)

Kanye West singles chronology
"Vultures" (2023)	"Talking / Once Again" (2024)	"Carnival" (2024)

Ty Dolla Sign singles chronology
"Vultures" (2023)	"Talking / Once Again" (2024)	"Carnival" (2024)

North West singles chronology
"Talking / Once Again" (2024)	"Childlike Things" (2025)

Music video
- Talking / Once Again on YouTube

Music video
- Talking / Once Again (Directed by North West) on YouTube

"Talking" (stylized in all uppercase, single version initially titled "Talking / Once Again") is a song by the American hip-hop supergroup ¥$, composed of rapper Kanye West and singer Ty Dolla Sign. Featuring the former's daughter, North West, it was first released as a promotional track on February 7, 2024, exclusively on Instagram, YouTube, and X. The song was later released to streaming services the following day as the second single from the duo's collaborative album, Vultures 1 (2024). It was produced by the duo, Camper, Dom Maker, Edsclusive, James Blake, No I.D., and Swizz Beatz, who wrote it alongside Ant Clemons, Cyhi the Prynce, Mamii, and Quentin Miller.

== Background and release ==
"Talking" was first previewed during the Vultures Rave event at Miami, Florida on December 12, 2023. Only including North's verse, the preview later became a viral sound on content platform TikTok. The song served as North's debut as a musical artist. On December 29, DJ Pharris previewed the song's second half on his radio show, WPWX Power 92 Chicago, which came after speculation that the unreleased track "Everybody" would be released as a single. The broadcast consisted of a loop of the "Once Again" portion and gained attention online due to DJ Pharris shouting out the fictional character Jonesy from Fortnite near the end, which fans and publications misinterpreted as part of the track.

The music video was teased on January 24, 2024 by West via Instagram, who posted a treatment created by North for the songs visuals. West officially released the song alongside its music video on February 7, 2024. It was later added to streaming services the next day.

== Composition ==
A hip-hop song with Jersey club elements, the first half of the song focuses on West's daughter, North. Over production provided by West and English singer James Blake, North introduces herself as "your bestie, miss, miss westie". North's verse is often described as a "catchy ear worm" with fun and confident lyricism.

The "Once Again" portion of the song switches the main artist from North to Ty Dolla Sign. In his verse, Ty Dolla Sign expresses his worries for his daughter, hoping that he has been a good role model for her while asking if there's any way to stop her from growing old. He ends his verse by vowing to break his predetermined destiny, putting in the hard work to ensure his daughter has a better life than his. West's only appearance is towards the songs outro, repeating the chorus from "Once Again".

== Critical reception ==
Writing for Billboard, Michael Saponara ranked "Talking" as the fifth best song on Vultures 1. Saponara praised North for "[cooking] up an earworm of a chorus that will easily be stuck in listeners’ heads for the weeks to come." He emphasizes Ty Dolla Sign's candidness on the track, expressing his concerns for his daughter "[in the] hopes she's properly prepared with the tools to take on the world." Saponara concludes that only someone like West could've "churn[ed] a positive fatherhood anthem into a rap hit."

== Music videos ==
The first music video, released alongside the "Talking" promotional single, is directed by Italian film directors Damiano and Fabio D'Innocenzo. Matteo Cocco handled the video's cinematography. The video shows shots of West and his daughter North, who is depicted getting her hair braided by a group of stylists. Ty Dolla Sign and his daughter, Jailynn Griffin, also appear.

On April 30, 2024, a music video directed by North West was released. The video was co-directed by Aus Taylor, who had worked on multiple visuals for Vultures 1, including photographing the cover art; cinematography was handled by Karim Belkasemi. It reuses the original treatment written by North in January. The visual focuses on North and her friends, hanging out while wearing Vultures-themed merch.

== Personnel ==
Credits are adapted from Spotify and Apple Music.

- Ye – vocals, writing, production
- Tyrone Griffin Jr. – vocals, writing, production
- North West – vocals, writing
- Darhyl Camper Jr. – writing, production
- Dominic Maker – writing, production
- Edward Davidi – writing, production
- Ernest Wilson – writing, production
- James Litherland – writing, production
- Kasseem Dean – writing, production
- Anthony Clemons Jr. – writing
- Cydel Young – writing
- Shawntoni Nichols – writing
- Quentin Miller – writing
- Rafael Fai Bautista – recording engineer
- Morning Estrada – recording engineer
- Mike Tucci – mastering engineer

== Charts ==
Chart performance for "Talking"
Chart (2024)	Peak position
Australia (ARIA)	66
Australia Hip Hop/R&B (ARIA)	19
Canada Hot 100 (Billboard)	30
Czech Republic Singles Digital (ČNS IFPI)	77
Global 200 (Billboard)	18
Iceland (Tónlistinn)	16
Italy (FIMI)	96
Latvia (LAIPA)	20
Lithuania (AGATA)	37
Netherlands (Single Top 100)	48
New Zealand (Recorded Music NZ)	32
Poland (Polish Streaming Top 100)	58
Portugal (AFP)	33
Slovakia Singles Digital (ČNS IFPI)	46
Sweden (Sverigetopplistan)	69
UK Indie (Official Charts)	14
UK Streaming (OCC)	83
US Billboard Hot 100	30
US Hot R&B/Hip-Hop Songs (Billboard)	12
