= Stomp (God's Property song) =

1997 single featuring Kirk Franklin & Cheryl James

Single by God's Property featuring Kirk Franklin & Cheryl James

from the album God's Property from Kirk Franklin's Nu Nation
- Released: 1997
- Genre: Gospel, Christian rap, Funk, Hip Hop, R&B
- Length: 5:04
- Label: Interscope
- Songwriters: Kirk Franklin, George Clinton, Jr., Garry Shider, Walter Morrison

God's Property singles chronology
"Stomp" (1997)	"You Are the Only One" (1997)

"Stomp" is a 1997 song by gospel group God's Property featuring Salt-N-Pepa rapper Cheryl James and Christian urban singer Kirk Franklin. One of the most successful gospel songs of the 1990s, "Stomp" charted on Billboard's mainstream R&B airplay list in 1997. The song samples "One Nation Under a Groove" by Funkadelic.

== Official remixes ==
Official dance remixes by London DJ Booker T were released on vinyl and were included on the European CD single release of "You Are the Only One".

- "Stomp (Booker T R&B Flavor Mix)" (6:12)
- "Stomp (Booker T Spiritual House Mix)" (5:11)
- "Stomp (Booker T Spiritual Property Mix)" (6:28)

== Chart performance ==
Weekly chart performance for "Stomp"
Chart (1997)	Peak position
Netherlands (Single Top 100)	88
UK Singles (Official Charts)	60
UK Dance (Official Charts)	24
UK Hip Hop/R&B (Official Charts)	10
US Radio Songs (Billboard)	52
US R&B/Hip-Hop Airplay (Billboard)	1
US Pop Airplay (Billboard)	34
US Rhythmic Airplay (Billboard)	12
Chart (2024)	Peak position
US Gospel Digital Song Sales (Billboard)	4
