= Mutt (album) =

Studio album by Leon Thomas
- Released: September 27, 2024
- Recorded: 2023–24
- Genres: R&B; hip hop; soul
- Length: 47:39
- Labels: EZMNY; Motown
- Producers: Aaron Paris; Ali Prawl; Axlfolie; Bam Beatz; Cam Griffin; Conductor Williams; D. Phelps; Faxxonly; Freaky Rob; Frollen Music Library; J.LBS; James Fauntleroy; Jehreeus; Khristopher Riddick-Tynes; Lawson; Leon Thomas; Lil Rod; Mamii; Michael Stokes; Mike Hector; Nile; Omar Grand; Oshi; Peter Lee Johnson; Stanley Randolph; Yuli

Leon Thomas chronology
Electric Dusk (2023)	Mutt (2024)	PHOLKS (2025)

Singles from Mutt
- 1. "Mutt" Released: August 8, 2024; 2. "Far Fetched" Released: September 13, 2024; 3. "Rather Be Alone" Released: April 18, 2025; 4. "Yes It Is" Released: September 5, 2025

Mutt is the second studio album by American singer and actor Leon Thomas, released on September 27, 2024, by EZMNY Records and Motown. Supported by the singles "Mutt" and "Far Fetched", the album features guest appearances from Masego, Wale, Ty Dolla $ign and Baby Rose.

An expanded deluxe edition of the album, subtitled Heel, was released on May 30, 2025; supported by the singles "Mutt (CB Remix)" and "Rather Be Alone". At the 68th Annual Grammy Awards, Mutt was nominated for Album of the Year and Best R&B Album and won the award for the latter.

== Background ==
In May 2022, Leon Thomas was announced as the first artist to be signed to Ty Dolla $ign's newly launched EZMNY Records imprint, which was a joint venture deal with Motown. His debut album, Electric Dusk, was released over a year later on August 25, 2023. Shortly after its release, Thomas began to start work on his second album, understanding that his deal with Motown would expect two albums in his "first cycle with them". Conceptually, the album was inspired by a breakup Thomas experienced at the time, as well as observing the similarities in behaviours between himself and his dog, a German Shepherd and Husky mix named Terry. In an interview on HuffPost, he described his dog as “a good guy, but he’s definitely mischievous... I was inspired by how he has great intentions but sometimes may do the wrong thing.”

== Singles and promotion ==
The album's title track was released as the lead single on August 9, 2024. This was followed by the remix, three weeks later on August 30, which featured a verse from rapper Freddie Gibbs. A Chris Brown remix of the title track was later released on March 21, 2025, as the lead single for the album's deluxe edition Heel. The second single "Far Fetched", featuring Ty Dolla $ign was released on September 13, two weeks prior to the album's release.

In June 2025, Thomas announced the Mutts Don’t Heel World Tour in support of the album. It began on October 30, 2025, in Dallas and concluded on April 19, 2026, in Perth.

== Critical reception ==
Mutt ratings
Review scores
Source	Rating
AllMusic	4/5 stars

The album was met with a positive reception. The Recording Academy gave special attention to album cuts "Vibes Don’t Lie" and "Yes It Is", lauding them a "baptism in neo-soul vocals, evoking innovators such as D’Angelo, Musiq Soulchild, and Maxwell." The project was also recognized for being "as lyrically rich as it is sonically expansive." In another positive review from publication The Culture Crypt, writer Valentina Reynolds applauded the project as "brave and bold... draw[ing] from the classic soul playbook and the modern rules of social media engagement in relationships to create something that feels timely yet not confined to 2024. His ability to effortlessly transition between slow, emotionally driven refrains and high-energy tracks highlights his musical versatility. With Mutt, Thomas has undeniably established himself as one of the leading voices in contemporary R&B."

== Track listing ==
Mutt track listing
No.	Title	Writer(s)	Producer(s)	Length
1.	"How Fast"	Leon Thomas; Lazaro Andres Camejo; Robert Fairfax III; Peter Lee Johnson	Thomas; Faxxonly; Johnson	2:55
2.	"Safe Place"	Thomas; Camejo; Fairfax; Brandon Avant; Donny Hathaway	Faxxonly; Bam Beatz	2:39
3.	"Dancing With Demons"	Thomas; Alexander Prawl; Margaux Whitney	Thomas; Ali Prawl; Yuli	4:02
4.	"Vibes Don't Lie"	Thomas; Camejo; Jason Pounds; Cam Griffin; Omar Grand	J.LBS; Griffin; Grand	3:22
5.	"Lucid Dreams" (featuring Masego)	Thomas; Micah Davis; David Kenneth Phelps; Robert Gueringer	D. Phelps; Freaky Rob; Thomas	3:46
6.	"Feelings on Silent" (featuring Wale)	Thomas; Camejo; Olubowale Akintimehin; Denzel Williams; Nile Hargrove; Darvid Thor; Henry Jenkins; Hudson Whitlock	Conductor Williams; Thomas; Nile Hargrove; Frollen Music Library	3:29
7.	"Answer Your Phone"	Thomas; Diane Warren; Gueringer; Johnson	Thomas; Freaky Rob; Johnson	4:02
8.	"Yes It Is"	Thomas; Camejo; Mike Hector; Prawl; Rodney Jones Jr.; Jariuce Banks; Johnson	Hector; Prawl; Lil Rod; Jehreeus; Johnson	3:48
9.	"Far Fetched" (featuring Ty Dolla $ign)	Thomas; Camejo; Tyrone Griffin; Joshua Brennan; Deavon Petty Chisolm	Thomas; Oshi; Lawson	4:08
10.	"Sooner or Later" (featuring Axlfolie)	Thomas; Axel Morgan	Thomas; Axlfolie	1:49
11.	"Mutt"	Thomas; Camejo; Phelps; Gueringer; Michael Stokes; Emanuel Johnson	Phelps; Freaky Rob	3:13
12.	"I Do"	Thomas; Camejo; Phelps; Gueringer	Freaky Rob; Phelps	2:41
13.	"I Used To" (featuring Baby Rose)	Thomas; Camejo; Jasmine Rose Wilson; Phelps; Gueringer; Shawntoni Nichols; Stanley Randolph	Phelps; Freaky Rob; Mamii; Randolph	3:28
14.	"Mutt" (remix; featuring Freddie Gibbs)	Thomas; Camejo; Fredrick Tipton; Phelps; Gueringer; Stokes; Johnson	Phelps; Freaky Rob	4:17
Total length:				47:39

Heel deluxe edition – disc two
No.	Title	Writer(s)	Producer(s)	Length
1.	"Heel"	Thomas; Nichols; Camejo; Gueringer; Phelps	Mamii; Phelps; Freaky Rob	3:55
2.	"Mutt (CB Remix)" (with Chris Brown)	Thomas; Chris Brown; Phelps; Dana Portalatin; Gueringer; Mariah Martinez; Ryan Press; Bizzy Crook; Elliott Trent; Stokes; Johnson	Phelps; Freaky Rob	3:19
3.	"Party Favors" (with Big Sean)	Thomas; Sean Anderson; Hargrove	Hargrove	2:51
4.	"Not Fair"	Thomas; Phelps; James Fauntleroy; Gueringer; Fairfax	Phelps; Fauntleroy; Freaky Rob; Faxxonly	3:16
5.	"Prize"	Thomas; Axlfolie; Phelps; Camejo; Hargrove; Gueringer	Phelps; Hargrove; Freaky Rob; Axlfolie	2:52
6.	"Rather Be Alone" (with Halle)	Thomas; Halle Bailey; Phelps; Gueringer; Fairfax	Thomas; Phelps; Freaky Rob; Faxxonly	3:11
7.	"Vibes Don't Lie" (remix; featuring Big Sean)	Thomas; Anderson; Camejo; Jason Pounds; Cam Griffin; Omar Grand	J.LBS; Griffin; Grand	4:14
8.	"Dirt On My Shoes" (with Kehlani)	Thomas; Kehlani Parrish; Alex Goldblatt; Phelps; Joseph McCue; Khristopher Riddick-Tynes; Gueringer	Thomas; Kehlani; Freaky Rob; Phelps; Khristopher Riddick-Tynes; Alex Goldblatt; Jester Beats	3:39
9.	"Catch a Stray"	Thomas; Aaron Paris; Benny Bock; Gueringer; Phelps	Thomas; Rex Kudo; Aaron Paris; Benny Bock; Freaky Rob; Phelps	4:42
Total length:				79:38

Notes

- All track titles are stylized in all caps.

Sample credits

- "Safe Place" contains a sample from "I Love You More Than You'll Ever Know", written and performed by Donny Hathaway.
- "Feelings on Silent" contains a sample from "The Hands of Time", written by Darvid Thor, Henry Jenkins and Hudson Whitlock, as performed by Frollen Music Library.
- "Mutt" contains a sample from "Silly Love Song", written by Michael Stokes and Emanuel Johnson, as performed by Enchantment.

== Charts ==
=== Weekly charts ===
Weekly chart performance for Mutt
Chart (2024–2026)	Peak position
Australian Albums (ARIA)	50
Australia Hip Hop/R&B Albums (ARIA)	21
New Zealand Albums (RMNZ)	39
UK R&B Albums (Official Charts)	30
US Billboard 200	35
US Top R&B/Hip-Hop Albums (Billboard)	8

=== Year-end charts ===
2025 year-end chart performance for Mutt
Chart (2025)	Position
US Billboard 200	167
US Top R&B/Hip-Hop Albums (Billboard)	52

== Certifications ==
Certifications for Mutt
Region	Certification	Certified units/sales
New Zealand (RMNZ)	Gold	7,500^{‡}
United States (RIAA)	Gold	500,000^{‡}
^{‡} Sales+streaming figures based on certification alone.

== Release history ==
Release dates and formats for Mutt
Region	Date	Label(s)	Format(s)	Edition(s)	Ref.
Various	September 27, 2024	EZMNY; Motown	Digital download; streaming	Standard	
Various	November 15, 2024	EZMNY; Motown	LP	Standard	
Various	May 30, 2025	EZMNY; Motown	Deluxe		
