= V1bes =

Mixtape by Leon Thomas III
- Released: January 1, 2014
- Recorded: 2013
- Genre: Pop; R&B
- Length: 24:59
- Label: Rostrum

Leon Thomas III chronology
Metro Hearts (2012)	V1bes (2014)	Before The Beginning (2016)

V1bes is the second mixtape by American singer and actor Leon Thomas III released on January 1, 2014 by Rostrum Records at midnight via DatPiff. It features remixes of the song "Bonita Applebum" by A Tribe Called Quest, and "Wu-Tang Forever" by rapper Drake. The song "Chill" contains samples from the 1989 Spike Lee film Do the Right Thing.

== Track listing ==
Thomas composed all of the songs himself, except where noted.

No.	Title	Writer(s)	Producer(s)	Length
1.	"Can't Tell"		Flume	3:28
2.	"Rivers"			3:54
3.	"Pain 2X"			2:54
4.	"Bonita"		A Tribe Called Quest	3:27
5.	"Chill"	Leon Thomas; Spike Lee	XXYYXX	3:04
6.	"Wu Tang" (featuring Karina Pasian)		Noah "40" Shebib	1:21
7.	"You And Me" (featuring Vali)			4:42
8.	"Aquarius"			2:09
Total length:				24:59
