= Philly Swain =

American rapper

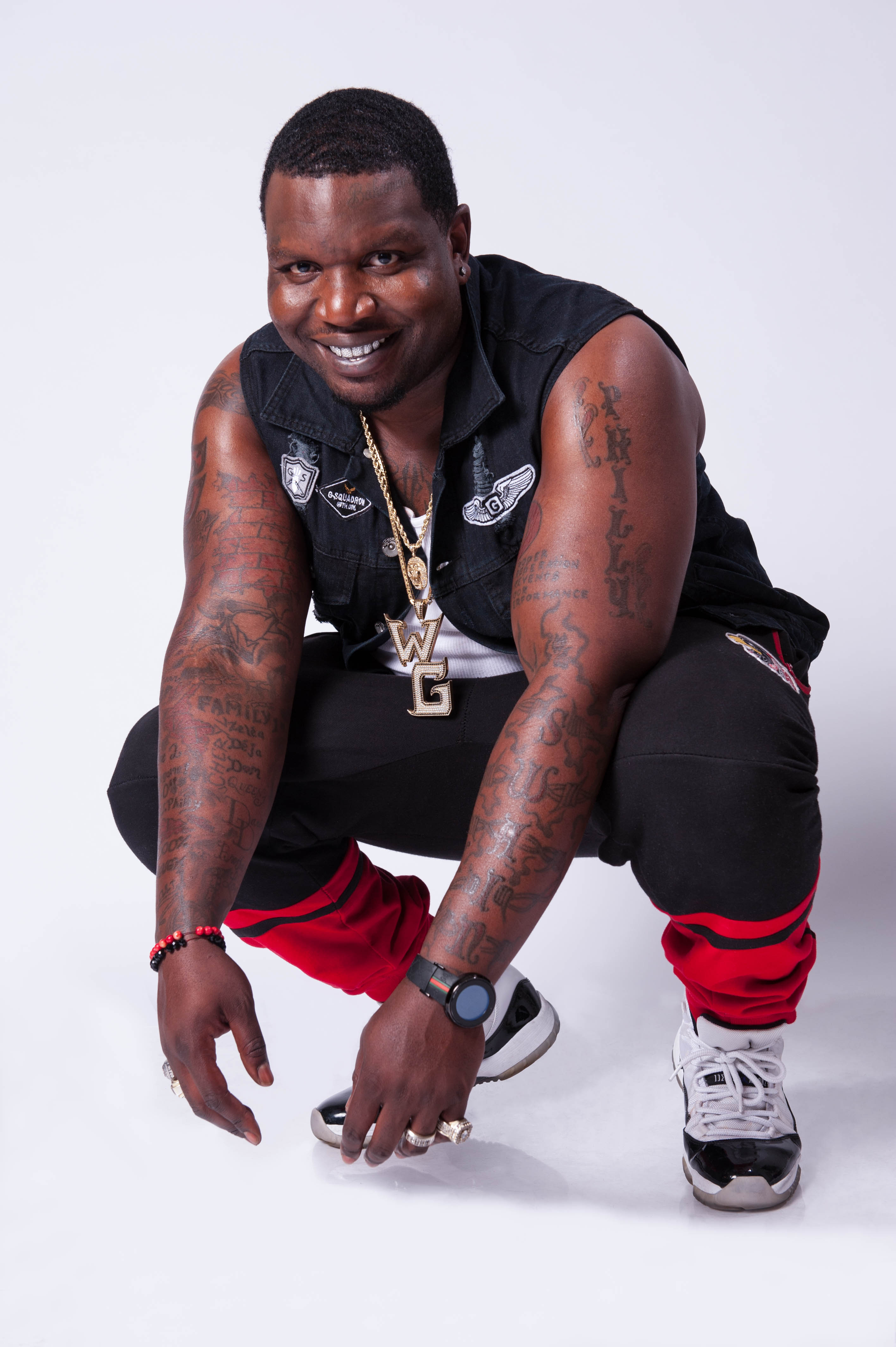

Background information
- Born: Darin Swain; Philadelphia, Pennsylvania, U.S.
- Genres: Hip Hop; Rap
- Years active: 2000–present
- Label: The Parade

Darin Swain, better known by his stage name "Philly Swain", is an American hip hop songwriter, artist, and producer from southwest Philadelphia. In 2016, Swain released his first studio album, A Change 4 the Better.

== Early life and career ==
Swain was born in Philadelphia, Pennsylvania. He has collaborated with several artists, including Travis Scott on the 2020 single "Love Me Love Me Love Me", and was featured on the E! television show Christina Milian Turned Up. He is the CEO of the Parade record label.

The short film Hustle Diaries documented Swain's career with Take Down Records. It was filmed by Viacom and directed by Barry Michael Cooper. Swain was featured in two songs, "Me" and "Salute", on Jamie Knight's 2007 album The Secret's Out. After winning Freestyle Fridays, he went 31–0 on MTV's Fight Club. In 2012, Swain's mixtape Swain Storm was featured on Philly's Hot 107.9 with DJ Damage.

After being nominated for Philadelphia's Hip Hop Artist of the Year, Philly starred in the network show The Swagger Family and released his debut album Mr. Philadelphia on Sony. In the MC battlefield, Philly won the Eminem Red Bull Tournament as Best MC. Swain decided to retire after filming another documentary The Last Battle.

== Discography ==
=== As producer/composer/writer ===
Tyga ft. Lil wayne - "4 My Dawgs" (Producer) 2015

Tyga - "Work" (Writer) 2014

Christina Milian - We Ain’t Worried (Producer/Writer) 2014

Christina Milian - "Liar" (Producer) 2015

Philly Swain ft. Christina Milian and YG - "Slo down" (Writer and Producer)

Nicki Minaj - "Mona Lisa" (Producer)

Nicki minaj - "Wamables" (Producer)

Philly Swain ft. T Pain - "Mancini" (Producer/Writer) 2015

Safaree - "Hater" (Writer) 2015

Safaree ft. Philly Swain - "Oh No" 2015

Safaree ft. Philly Swain "Shaderoom" (Producer/ Writer) 2015

K Michelle - "Down in the DMs" verse (Writer)

Philly Swain & Tim Armstrong - "I’m Ready"

Philly Swain - "Swain Storm" Mixtape (2012)

Philly Swain - Hustle Diaries Vol 1 Mixtape (2011)

Philly Swain - A Change 4 The Better Album (2016)

Love Me Love Me Love Me ft. Travis Scott (2020)
