= Ghost-Note =

Musical group from Dallas, TX, USA

- Origin: Dallas, Texas, US
- Genres: funk; jazz; hip hop
- Years active: 2014–present
- Label: Ropeadope; Artistry Music/Mack Avenue Music Group
- Spinoff of: Snarky Puppy
- Members: Robert "Sput" Searight; Nate Werth; AJ Brown; Dywane "MonoNeon" Thomas; Sylvester Onyejiaka; Dominique Xavier Taplin; Peter Knudsen; Jonathan Mones; Mike Jelani Brooks
- Website: www.ghost-note-official.com

Ghost-Note is a percussion-based funk, hip hop and jazz fusion group from Dallas, Texas, with a rotating membership based around founding drummer Robert "Sput" Searight and founding percussionist Nate Werth, two members of the jazz band Snarky Puppy. The group also includes bassist MonoNeon, keyboardist Dominique Xavier Taplin, saxophonist/flutist Michael Jelani Brooks, saxophonist/flutist Jonathan Mones, and saxophonist/flutist Sylvester Onyejiaka.

Ghost-Note's two albums – Fortified and Swagism – both reached No. 1 on the iTunes Jazz Chart.

== Career ==
Robert "Sput" Searight founded God's Property, a gospel choir affiliated with Kirk Franklin. Nate Werth was a music student at the University of North Texas and a member of Snarky Puppy, then playing jam sessions around Dallas. Searight and Werth performed together with Snarky Puppy through seven albums (of nine the group recorded during that time).

In 2014, Searight and Werth wanted to create another band that would focus on percussion and what they termed "conscious funk". They formed Ghost-Note and released their first album, Fortified, on the Ropeadope label in October 2015, incorporating influences from jazz, hip hop and EDM music. Fortified featured Snarky Puppy keyboardist Shaun Martin, vocalist N'Dambi and guitarist Mark Lettieri, among others. The album went to No. 1 on the iTunes Jazz chart.

Swagism was Ghost-Note's second album, released in April 2018 on Ropeadope. This album also went to No. 1 on the iTunes Jazz chart. It featured guitarist Raja Kassis, spoken word artist and author Prudence the Auset Sneed, saxophonist Kamasi Washington and guitarist Brandon "Taz" Neiderauer. Matt Stieg of New York magazine wrote that, on Swagism, Searight and Werth "stretch their ensemble into all possible contortions, from CTI's disco to D'Angelo's funk. It's the omnivorous diet of J Dilla come to life in big-band form."

== Touring ==
Ghost-Note began touring in 2015. A rotating membership of musicians joined them onstage, including keyboardist Daniel Jones, xylosynth player Nick Werth, drummer Alvin Ford Jr and bassist Cody Wright. In 2018, the touring ensemble included bassist Dwayne "MonoNeon" Thomas Jr., keyboardists Xavier Taplin and Vaughn "V.Keys" Henry, guitarist Peter Knudsen, and saxophonist/flutist Jonathan Mones. The group has played the Edmonton International Jazz Festival, the London Jazz Festival, the TD Ottawa JazzFest, and the Montreal Jazz Fest. They have performed in Memphis, Chicago, San Francisco Bay Area, Philadelphia, Washington DC, Atlanta, New Orleans, and Dallas, as well as at shows in Norway, Sweden, Germany, the Netherlands, and Italy.

== Members ==
- Robert "Sput" Searight - drums, keyboards
- Nate Werth - percussion

=== Additional contributors ===
- AJ Brown - bass
- Dywane "MonoNeon" Thomas - bass
- Dominique Xavier Taplin - keyboards
- Vaughn Henry - keyboards
- Sylvester Onyejiaka - saxophone, flute
- Jonathan Mones - saxophone, flute
- Mike Jelani Brooks - saxophone, flute
- Peter Knudsen - guitar
- Mike Clowes - guitar
- Daniel Wytannis - trombone

== Discography ==
- Fortified (2015)
- Swagism (2018)
- Mustard n'Onions (2024)
