= Rising Stars (film) =

- Directed by: Dan Millican
- Starring: Kyle Riabko; Lauren Ashley Carter; Leon Thomas III; Barry Corbin; Fisher Stevens; Rebecca St. James; Pierce Cravens
- Music by: Ryan Shore
- Production company: Doberman Entertainment
- Distributed by: Screen Media Films
- Release date: October 22, 2010
- Running time: 90 minutes
- Country: United States
- Language: English
- Budget: 8 Million
- Box office: 30,789,289

Rising Stars is a 2010 American teen musical drama film. The film was directed by Dan Millican. Rising Stars stars Kyle Riabko, Lauren Ashley Carter, Leon Thomas III, Fisher Stevens, Barry Corbin, and Rebecca St. James and follows three teen musical groups competing in a music video competition. The film is distributed by Screen Media Films and was released to three theaters on October 22, 2010.

== Plot ==
A family musical with heart, Rising Stars explores the sacrifices that come with fame in reality television-obsessed culture. Challenged with creating songs and music videos, three musical acts find more than their futures on the line when the competition gets fierce and their lives are caught on tape broadcast to the nation. Egos clash and worlds collide as these teens find how far they will go to win the coveted prize and achieve stardom.

== Cast ==
- Kyle Riabko as Chance
- Lauren Ashley Carter as Natalie
- Leon Thomas III as JR
- Barry Corbin*
- Fisher Stevens as Mo
- Rebecca St. James as Kari
- Catherine Mary Stewart as Ms. Cage
- Graham Patrick Martin as Garrett
- Natalie Hall as Brenna
- Jason Edward Cook as Petey
- Jessie Payo as Eigsh
- Jordan Walker Ross as Jeremiah
- Pierce Cravens as Kevin

== Soundtrack ==
A soundtrack for the film was released on October 19, 2010, to iTunes. It features fourteen original songs from the motion picture. The first single from the soundtrack was released on October 6, 2010. Entitled "It's You", the song is performed by Jessie Payo and Leon Thomas III, who both star in the film.

The score was composed by Ryan Shore.

== Home media ==
The film was released to DVD on February 22, 2010.
