= Watching Us =

2025 song by Wale featuring Leon Thomas

Song by Wale featuring Leon Thomas

from the album Everything Is a Lot
- Released: November 14, 2025
- Recorded: 2023–2025
- Genre: Hip-hop; R&B
- Length: 3:49
- Label: Def Jam Recordings
- Songwriters: Olubowale Akintimehin; Leon Thomas; Mike Hector; Nile Hargrove; Rob Gueringer; Pharrell Williams; Chad Hugo; Johnny Winik
- Producers: Hector; D. Phelps; Hargrove; Freaky Rob

Music video
- "Watching Us" on YouTube

"Watching Us" is a song by American rapper Wale featuring American singer Leon Thomas from the former's eighth studio album, Everything Is a Lot (2025). It samples "Closer" by Goapele and was produced by Mike Hector, D. Phelps, Nile Hargrove and Freaky Rob.

== Composition ==
The song is built on a sample of "Closer". It features "reflective storytelling" from Wale, while Leon Thomas performs with a "smooth, soulful delivery."

== Critical reception ==
Shawn Grant of The Source wrote that the song "The romantic tone gives the record an intimate feel that has resonated strongly with listeners." Lemarcus of Shatter the Standards opined that Thomas was "stealing the show" on the song.

== Music video ==
An official music video was directed by Hidji and released on February 3, 2026. It depicts quiet, intimate moments of a relationship in a home setting, contrasted with scenes of nightlife a city.

== Charts ==
Weekly chart performance for "Watching Us"
Chart (2025–2026)	Peak position
US Billboard Hot 100	76
US Hot R&B/Hip-Hop Songs (Billboard)	14
US Rhythmic Airplay (Billboard)	1

== Release history ==
Release dates and formats for "Watching Us"
Region	Date	Format	Label(s)	Ref.
United States	January 13, 2026	Rhythmic contemporary	Def Jam	
