= Bizzy Crook =

American rapper

Bizzy
- Born: Lazaro Andres Camejo; December 27, 1991 (age 34); Miami, Florida, United States
- Genre: Hip hop
- Occupation: Rapper
- Instrument: Vocals
- Years active: 2011–present
- Label: EZMNY

Lazaro Andres Camejo (born December 27, 1991), better known by his stage name BZZY or Bizzy Crook, as he was formerly known, is an American rapper from Miami, Florida.

== Early life ==
Lazaro Camejo was born in Miami, Florida on December 27, 1991. He spent several years of his childhood in Egypt, but was mostly raised in Florida. Camejo nicknamed himself BZZY because he was always up to no good as a kid. As he grew and separated himself from trouble, he decided to stick with the name since he had already gained a fan base with his music.

With an initial passion for poetry, BZZY was drawn more towards songwriting after hearing "My Name Is" by Eminem for the first time at the age of 7. From that point, he knew that making music is what he wanted to pursue and make a career out of. He grew up listening to hip-hop artists such as Eminem, Fabolous, Jay Z, Nas, Trick Daddy, Lloyd Banks, Kanye West and The Diplomats. BZZY was caught with a gun at age 12, then later arrested at the age of 16 for again possessing a firearm. The time was spent at a juvenile detention center in Florida. At the age of 18, he signed his first record deal with Mona Scott.

== Career ==
BZZY's career began with South Florida-based hip hop collective PayUp! Game. He later left to pursue a solo career. BZZY released his first mixtape, PS I'm Sorry, in 2011 while still attending high school. Soon after, him and his label decided to part ways. Experiencing depression earlier in his life over past relationships, the split with the label caused him to fall back to that depressed state. His past depression had him even almost commit suicide. In 2012 BZZY dropped P.S. I'm Sorry 2 which featured tracks with rappers Jim Jones, Vado along with several others and was executive produced by Amer Hanini. BZZY went on to release his now most-known mixtapes ’84 and No Hard Feelings. Currently an independent artist, he works closely with his team he calls Good Luck, which is everything from producing, merchandise, photography, etc.

BZZY's mixtape 84 was released in 2013, which landed him as an opener alongside rapper King Los-for the My Own Lane tour, headlining Kid Ink. His mixtape No Hard Feelings, released in 2014 and currently having over 2 million streams, got him as an opener-along with rap group Audio Push-for the Simply Nothing tour, starring Wale.

In 2016 BZZY released two projects, A Part of Everything and While You Were Away.

BZZY released his first album titled Before I Jump in 2018. Crook describes the album as "a suicidal letter" for himself that he shared with the world.

BZZY has had his music videos played on MTV, VH1, BET and more. He was nominated for the 2015 XXL Freshmen Class. as well as Billboard Magazine’s “Artist on the Verge” Class of 2015. He was also featured on the music streaming service Tidal under the "Tidal Discovery" segment.

In addition to touring, BZZY has performed at events such as South by Southwest (SXSW) and Hot97 Who's Next. More recently, BZZY performed for the 2015 Made in America event headlined by Beyoncé, The Weeknd, J. Cole and more.

== Discography ==
Albums

- Before I Jump (2018)

Mixtapes

- A Part of Everything (2016)
- While You Were Away (2016)
- Coming to America (2014)
- No Hard Feelings (2014)
- 84 (2013)
- P.S. I'm Sorry 2 (2013)
