= Leon Thomas =

American singer and songwriter (born 1993)

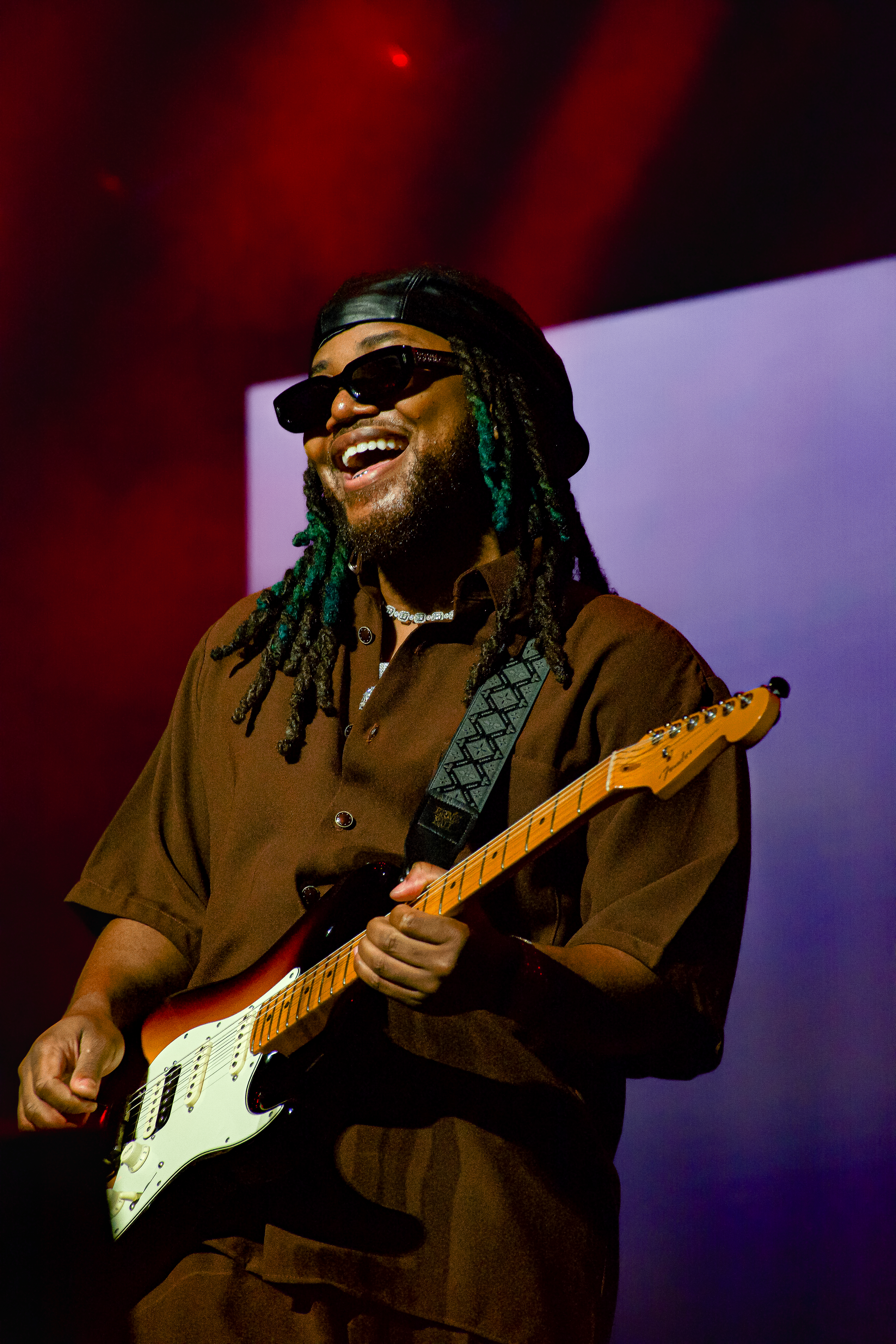
- Thomas performing in 2026

Background information
- Born: Leon George Thomas III; August 1, 1993 (age 33); Brooklyn, New York City, U.S.
- Genres: R&B; soul; hip-hop
- Occupations: Singer; songwriter; musician; record producer; actor
- Years active: 2003–present
- Labels: Columbia; Rostrum; EZMNY; Motown
- Member of: The Rascals
- Website: leonthomas.com

Leon George Thomas III (born August 1, 1993) is an American singer, songwriter, musician, record producer and actor. He began his career as a child actor on Broadway, appearing in the musicals The Lion King, Caroline, or Change and The Color Purple across the 2000s as well as voicing Tyrone in the Nick Jr. animated series The Backyardigans (2005-08) and starring in the film August Rush (2007). He gained wider recognition for starring as Andre Harris in the Nickelodeon teen sitcom Victorious (2010–2013).

Shifting focus onto his music career, Thomas achieved success in the 2010s as a member of the production duo The Rascals with Khris Riddick-Tynes. During this period, he co-wrote and co-produced for artists including his Victorious co-star Ariana Grande, Babyface, Drake, Rick Ross, SZA, and Toni Braxton. He also released three mixtapes and an extended play under Rostrum Records.

In 2022, he signed with Ty Dolla Sign's EZMNY Records and Motown. At the 67th Annual Grammy Awards, he won Best R&B Song for co-writing the SZA song "Snooze". He achieved critical and commercial success with his second album, Mutt (2024), which became his first entry on the Billboard 200. Its lead single, "Mutt", became his first solo entry on the Billboard Hot 100 and peaked at number six. At the 68th Annual Grammy Awards, he received six nominations, including Album of the Year and Best New Artist, and won Best R&B Album for Mutt and Best Traditional R&B Performance for "Vibes Don't Lie".

== Life and career ==
Thomas was born on August 1, 1993, in Brooklyn, New York City, to Jayon Anthony and Leon George Thomas II. His maternal grandfather is John D. Anthony, a jazz musician and opera singer who appeared on Broadway in Jimmy and Porgy and Bess. Thomas' parents divorced when he was young and his mother remarried to musician Jon Kevin Jones when he was 6 in 1999. He has a younger half sister through his mother's second marriage. Thomas made his Broadway debut at the age of 10 in 2003 as young Simba in the Broadway production of The Lion King. In 2004, he appeared as Jackie Thibodeaux in the original Broadway cast of Tony Kushner's Caroline, or Change, and toured with the company during its five-month run in Los Angeles and San Francisco, California. Thomas also performed in the Broadway production of The Color Purple. In 2007, Thomas appeared in the film August Rush as Arthur, performing the song "La Bamba", and briefly after signed a development deal with Nickelodeon appearing as the singing voice for Tyrone in the animated series The Backyardigans. Thomas has also guest-starred on Jack's Big Music Show and Just Jordan. He also appeared as Harper in the iCarly episode "iCarly Saves TV" and was featured on The Naked Brothers Band "Christmas Special".

He played a main character on Victorious, portraying Andre Harris, which premiered on Nickelodeon on March 27, 2010. Thomas also appeared as Andre in the crossover episode between Victorious and iCarly, iParty with Victorious. He also appeared as himself in an episode of True Jackson, VP. On August 2, 2011, the soundtrack album Victorious: Music from the Hit TV Show was released, with Thomas featured in the songs "Song 2 You" and "Tell Me That You Love Me". On June 5, 2012, Victorious 2.0: More Music from the Hit TV Show was also released, with Thomas featured in the songs "Countdown" and "Don't You (Forget About Me)". Victorious ended production in July 2012 and the series' last episode aired on February 2, 2013.

In 2012, Thomas started to record his first mixtape called Metro Hearts; it was released on August 1, 2012. Songs on the mixtape include "Forever", "Bad", "Moving On", "Vibe", "Like Clay", and "Never Look Back". The mixtape also included a cover of Drake's "Take Care" with Ariana Grande. Thomas co-wrote the song "Ain't No Other Me" for the British girl group Stooshe, which features as a deluxe edition track on their debut album, London with the Lights On. Thomas co-wrote four songs on his former co-star Ariana Grande's 2013 album Yours Truly. He also co-produced four songs on the album, in addition to the song "Last Christmas" from Grande's EP Christmas Kisses, as a member of production duo the Rascals alongside Khristopher Riddick-Tynes. His production work under the Rascals was also included on Toni Braxton and Babyface's Grammy Award-winning album Love, Marriage & Divorce, contributing to the solo "I'd Rather Be Broke", performed by Braxton.

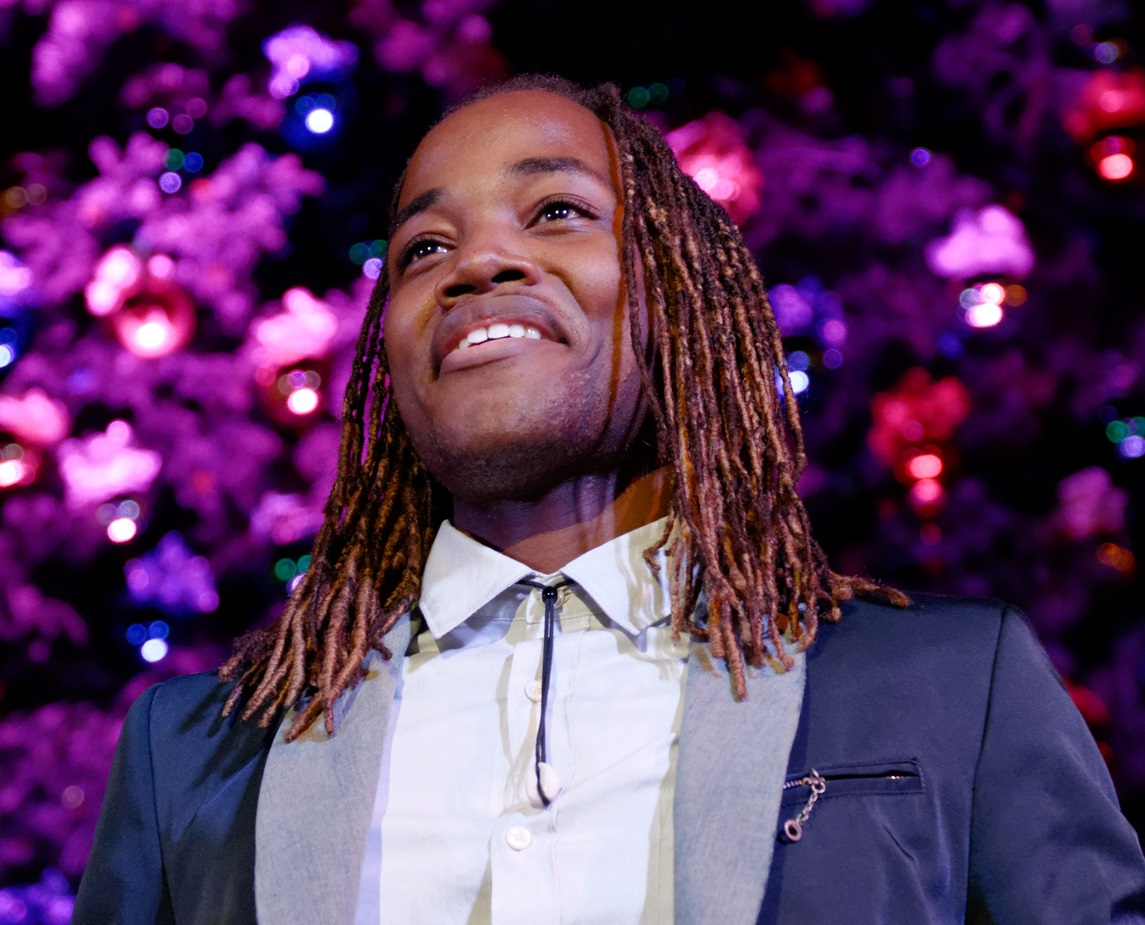
Thomas in 2013

On September 24, 2013, Thomas released a new single, "Hello How Are You" (featuring Wiz Khalifa). On January 1, 2014, Thomas released a new mixtape, V1bes, under the name Leon Thomas, via DatPiff. He also announced that a music video for "Hello How Are You" was in the works. In 2016, he served as a co-producer for Post Malone's album Stoney.

In 2016, Thomas released the mixtape Before the Beginning via SoundCloud, which compiled eight songs which he had "[held on] for a long time". In 2017, he appeared in the Kathryn Bigelow-directed film Detroit.

2018 saw the release of Thomas' debut EP Genesis, which featured guest appearances from Buddy and Tayla Parx. The next year, Thomas earned a Grammy Award for Best Rap Song nomination at the 62nd Annual Grammy Awards for co-writing and co-producing the song "Gold Roses" by Rick Ross (featuring Drake).

Thomas would also go on to write and produce more records under the Rascals production duo, as well as a solo producer, co-writing, and co-producing two songs on Ariana Grande's Positions, and three songs on Drake's Certified Lover Boy.

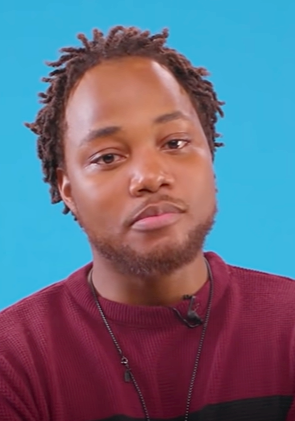
Thomas in 2020

In May 2022, Ty Dolla Sign signed a joint venture deal with Motown for his newly launched EZMNY Records imprint, announcing Thomas to be the label's first artist.

He was one of the writers and producers on the track "Burn" by ¥$ (Kanye West and Ty Dolla Sign) from their album Vultures 1, released on February 10, 2024. Also in 2024, Thomas won his first Grammy Award for Best R&B Song for his contribution to SZA's hit song "Snooze".

On June 13, 2025, the track "Brown Sugar" was released; a collaboration between Thomas and Dylan Sinclair. Thomas released the NPR Tiny Desk version of "Mutt" on August 9, 2025.

In 2026 he was featured on Chris Brown's single "Fallin'".

On July 31, 2026, Thomas was featured on "Tell Everybody," a track on Nigerian Afrobeats artist Davido's sixth studio album, Oriadé, released via Columbia Records UK. Sony Music described the track, built around the refrain "Tell everybody, how you leave me wanting more," as exploring the vulnerability of love, with Thomas's "soulful vocals and rich harmonies" complementing Davido's performance; its official music video premiered on August 2, 2026.

== Filmography ==
=== Film ===
Year	Title	Role	Notes
2003	Robin and Roger	Boy	"The Plan" (season 1, episode 3); nine-episode series
2007	August Rush	Arthur	
2010	Rising Stars	JR	
2014	Bad Asses	Tucson	
2015	Runaway Island	Evan Holloway	
2017	Detroit	Darryl	
2026	Rolling Loud		Filming

=== Television ===
Year	Title	Role	Notes
2004	Saturday Night Live	Young Michael Jackson	1 episode
2006	Just for Kicks	Ty	2 episodes
2006–2008	The Backyardigans	Tyrone	Main singing voice role (season 2-season 3 episode 5)
2007	Just Jordan	Ronnie	Episode: "Revenge of the Riff"
2007	Jack's Big Music Show	Himself	Episode: "Laurie's Big Song"
2008, 2011	iCarly	Harper	Episode: "iCarly Saves TV"
2008, 2011	iCarly	Andre Harris	Crossover movie: iParty with Victorious
2008	The Naked Brothers Band	Leon Williams	Episode: "Christmas Special"
2010–2013	Victorious	Andre Harris	Main role, 57 episodes
2011	True Jackson, VP	Himself	Episode: "True Fame"
2014	Satisfaction	Mateo	Recurring role, 6 episodes
2014	Robot and Monster	Monster's singing voice	
2015	Fear the Walking Dead	Russell	Episode: "Pilot"
2016	The New Edition Story	Bobby Brown (singing voice)	3 episodes
2017	Insecure	Eddie	Recurring role

== Discography ==
Studio albums

- Electric Dusk (2023)
- Mutt (2024)

== Broadway appearances ==
- The Lion King
- Caroline, or Change
- The Color Purple

== Tours ==
Headlining

- Mutts Don’t Heel World Tour (2025–2026)

Supporting

- Big Time Rush – Big Time Summer Tour (2012)
- Bruno Mars – The Romantic Tour (2026)

== Awards and nominations ==
Association	Year	Category	Work	Result	Ref.
American Music Awards	2026	New Artist of the Year	Himself	Nominated	
American Music Awards	2026	Song of the Year	"Mutt"	Nominated	
American Music Awards	2026	Best R&B Song	"Mutt"	Nominated	
American Music Awards	2026	Best R&B Album	Mutt	Nominated	
American Music Awards	2026	Breakthrough R&B Artist	Himself	Won	
BET Awards	2025	Best Male R&B/Pop Artist	Himself	Nominated	
BET Awards	2025	Best New Artist	Himself	Won	
BET Awards	2026	Album of the Year	Mutt Deluxe: Heel	Nominated	
BET Awards	2026	Best Male R&B/Pop Artist	Himself	Won	
Grammy Awards	2020	Best Rap Song	"Gold Roses"	Nominated	
Grammy Awards	2024	Best R&B Song	"Snooze" (as a songwriter)	Won	
Grammy Awards	2026	Album of the Year	Mutt	Nominated	
Grammy Awards	2026	Best R&B Album	Mutt	Won	
Grammy Awards	2026	Best New Artist	Himself	Nominated	
Grammy Awards	2026	Best R&B Performance	"Mutt – Live From NPR's Tiny Desk"	Nominated	
Grammy Awards	2026	Best Traditional R&B Performance	"Vibes Don't Lie"	Won	
Grammy Awards	2026	Best R&B Song	"Yes It Is"	Nominated	
Grammy Awards	2027	Best Progressive R&B Album	''Pholks''	Pending	
Grammy Awards	2027	Best R&B Song	''My Muse''	Pending	
Grammy Awards	2027	Best Traditional R&B Performance	''My Muse''	Pending	
Grammy Awards	2027	Best R&B Collaboration or Duo/Group Performance	''Fallin' (with Chris Brown)''	Pending	
Grammy Awards	2027	Best R&B Collaboration or Duo/Group Performance	''Sweet Nuthins''(with Kehlani	Pending	
Grammy Awards	2027	Best Melodic Rap Performance	''Watching Us''(with Wale	Pending	
Kids' Choice Awards	2025	Favorite Male Breakout Artist	Himself	Nominated	
NAACP Image Awards	2012	Outstanding Performance by a Youth (Series, Special, Television Movie or Limited-series)	Victorious	Nominated	
NAACP Image Awards	2026	Outstanding Best Soul /R&B Song	"Yes It Is"	Nominated	
NAACP Image Awards	2026	NAACP Image Award for Outstanding Duo or Group	"Mutt (Remix) " featuring. Chris Brown	Nominated	
NAACP Image Awards	2026	Outstanding Male Artist	Himself	Nominated	
NAACP Image Awards	2026	Outstanding Album	Mutt Deluxe: Heel	Nominated	
Young Artist Awards	2008	Best Performance In A Feature Film - Supporting Young Actor (Fantasy or Drama)	August Rush	Won	
