= Raye discography =

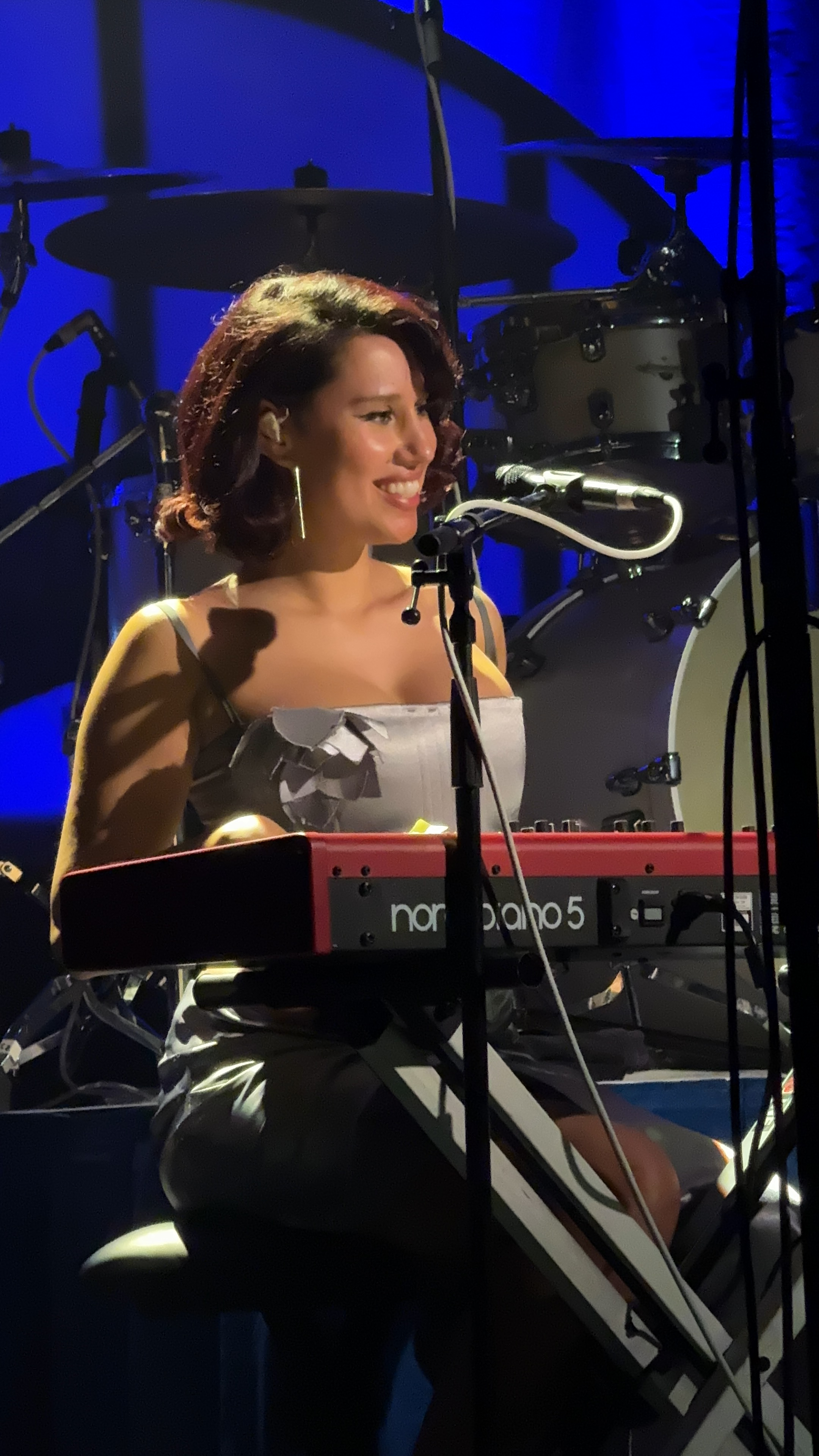
- Raye performing in 2023
- Studio albums: 2
- EPs: 6
- Live albums: 2
- Singles: 41
- Music videos: 36
- Promotional singles: 13

The British singer-songwriter Raye has released two studio albums, two live albums, six extended plays (EPs), forty-one singles (including twelve as a featured artist), and thirteen promotional singles. Her first EP, Welcome to the Winter, was self-released to SoundCloud in 2014. Raye signed a recording contract with Polydor Records shortly after and released her EP Second in 2016, which was preceded by her debut single "I, U, Us". She featured on the singles "By Your Side" by Jonas Blue and "You Don't Know Me" by Jax Jones in late 2016; the latter charted at number three on the UK singles chart and within the top ten in other European countries, later receiving a diamond certification in France. In 2017, Raye was part of Artists for Grenfell's cover version of "Bridge over Troubled Water", which reached number one in the United Kingdom.

The songs "Decline" featuring Mr Eazi, and "Cigarette" with Mabel and Stefflon Don, preceded Raye's third EP, Side Tape (2018). Following a string of singles, Raye collaborated with Regard on "Secrets" in 2020; the song peaked at number six in the UK and was certified platinum in some countries. It was included on Euphoric Sad Songs, released in November of the same year. In early 2021, Raye released "Bed" with Joel Corry and David Guetta, which became her highest-peaking song as a lead artist in the UK at the time. Later that year, Raye declared that Polydor Records refused to release her debut album for seven years. She later parted ways from the label and became an independent artist, later signing with the distribution company Human Re Sources.

Raye's debut studio album, My 21st Century Blues, was released on 3 February 2023, to commercial success. It was preceded by the singles "Hard Out Here", "Black Mascara", "Escapism" featuring 070 Shake, and "The Thrill Is Gone". Following the track's virality on social media, "Escapism" became Raye's first number one single in the UK, her first entry on the US Billboard Hot 100, and her highest-peaking song on several other charts including the Billboard Global 200. The same year, Raye's collaboration with Cassö and D-Block Europe, titled "Prada", topped the national charts in various countries. The singer later featured on Lisa's "Born Again" alongside Doja Cat.

== Albums ==
=== Studio albums ===
Title	Details	Peak chart positions										Sales	Certifications
Title	Details	UK	AUS	CAN	FRA	GER	IRE	NLD	NOR	NZ	US	Sales	Certifications
My 21st Century Blues	Released: 3 February 2023; Label: Human Re Sources; Format: CD, LP, digital download, streaming, cassette	2	97	25	97	34	13	21	16	34	58	UK: 295,002	BPI: Gold; MC: Platinum; RMNZ: Platinum; SNEP: Gold
This Music May Contain Hope	Released: 27 March 2026; Label: Human Re Sources; Format: CD, LP, digital download, streaming	1	6	10	6	3	2	1	2	4	11	UK: 152,141; FRA: 30,000 (Note: France sales figures for This Music May Contain Hope as of June 2026.)	BPI: Gold; MC: Gold; RMNZ: Gold

=== Live albums ===
List of live albums, with selected details and chart positions
Title	Details	Peak chart positions			
Title	Details	UK	UK Indie	UK Vinyl	SCO
My 21st Century Symphony (Live at the Royal Albert Hall) (with the Heritage Orchestra)	Released: 16 October 2023; Label: Human Re Sources; Format: CD, DVD, CD/DVD, Blu-ray, digital download, streaming	83	8	11	49
Live at Montreux Jazz Festival	Released: 13 September 2024; Label: Human Re Sources; Format: LP, digital download, streaming	—	22	—	—
"—" denotes a recording that did not chart or was not released in that territory.

== Extended plays ==
List of extended plays, with selected details, chart positions, and certifications
Title	Details	Peak chart positions		Certifications
Title	Details	UK DL	UK Vinyl	Certifications
Welcome to the Winter	Released: 19 November 2014; Label: Self-released; Format: Digital download, streaming	—	—	
Second	Released: 11 August 2016; Label: Polydor; Format: Digital download, streaming	—	—	
Side Tape	Released: 4 May 2018; Label: Polydor; Format: Digital download, streaming	—	—	
Deezer Sessions	Released: 21 April 2020; Label: Universal; Format: Streaming	—	—	
Euphoric Sad Songs	Released: 20 November 2020; Label: Polydor; Format: LP, digital download, streaming	71	31	BPI: Silver
Apple Music Home Session: Raye	Released: 23 July 2021; Label: Polydor; Format: Digital download, streaming	—	—	
"—" denotes a recording that did not chart or was not released in that territory.

== Singles ==
=== As lead artist ===
List of singles as lead artist, with selected chart positions and certifications, showing year released and album name
Title	Year	Peak chart positions										Certifications	Album
Title	Year	UK	AUS	CAN	FRA	GER	IRE	NLD	SWE	US	WW	Certifications	Album
"Bet U Wish"	2015	—	—	—	—	—	—	—	—	—	—		Welcome to the Winter
"I, U, Us"	2016	—	—	—	—	—	—	—	—	—	—		Second
"The Line"	2017	65	—	—	—	—	—	—	—	—	—		Non-album single
"Decline" (featuring Mr Eazi)	2017	15	—	—	—	—	28	—	—	—	—	BPI: Platinum	Side Tape
"Check" (with Kojo Funds)	2018	26	—	—	—	—	—	—	—	—	—	BPI: Platinum	Golden Boy
"Cigarette" (Note: "Cigarette" also appears as a bonus track on Mabel's mixtape Ivy to Roses and debut album High Expectations.) (with Mabel and Stefflon Don)	2018	41	—	—	—	—	74	—	—	—	—	BPI: Gold	Side Tape
"Friends"	2018	66	—	—	—	—	67	—	—	—	—		Non-album single
"Love Me Again"	2019	55	—	—	—	—	34	—	—	—	—	BPI: Gold	Euphoric Sad Songs
"Make It to Heaven" (with David Guetta and Morten)	2019	—	—	—	—	—	—	—	—	—	—		Non-album singles
"Tequila" (with Jax Jones and Martin Solveig)	2020	21	—	—	—	—	19	—	—	—	—	BPI: Gold	Non-album singles
"Secrets" (with Regard)	2020	6	24	—	71	84	7	17	60	— (Note: "Secrets" did not chart on the Billboard Hot 100 but did peak at number 39 on the Pop Airplay chart.)	122	BPI: Platinum; ARIA: Platinum; BVMI: Gold; MC: Platinum; RMNZ: Platinum; SNEP: Platinum	Euphoric Sad Songs
"Natalie Don't"	2020	— (Note: "Natalie Don't" did not enter the UK Singles Chart, but peaked at number 30 on the UK Singles Download Chart.)	—	—	—	—	—	—	—	—	—		Euphoric Sad Songs
"Love of Your Life"	2020	—	—	—	—	—	—	—	—	—	—		Euphoric Sad Songs
"Regardless" (with Rudimental)	2020	37	—	—	—	—	69	—	—	—	—	BPI: Silver	Euphoric Sad Songs
"Bed" (with Joel Corry and David Guetta)	2021	3	20	100	139	34	3	7	76	—	48	BPI: 2× Platinum; ARIA: 2× Platinum; BVMI: Gold; MC: Platinum; RMNZ: Platinum; SNEP: Gold	Another Friday Night
"Call on Me"	2021	64	—	—	—	—	70	—	—	—	—		Non-album singles
"I Don't Want You" (with Riton)	2021	50	—	—	—	—	49	—	—	—	—	BPI: Silver	Non-album singles
"Summer Love" (with Cassper Nyovest)	2021	—	—	—	—	—	—	—	—	—	—		Non-album singles
"Waterfall" (with Disclosure)	2022	67	—	—	—	—	—	—	—	—	—	BPI: Silver; RMNZ: Gold	Non-album singles
"Hard Out Here"	2022	— (Note: "Hard Out Here" did not enter the UK Singles Chart, but peaked at number 32 on the UK Independent Singles chart.)	—	—	—	—	—	—	—	—	—		My 21st Century Blues
"Black Mascara"	2022	— (Note: "Black Mascara" did not enter the UK Singles Chart, but peaked at number 30 on the UK Independent Singles chart, and number 46 on the UK Singles Downloads Chart and the UK Singles Sales Chart.)	—	—	—	—	—	—	—	—	—	BPI: Silver	My 21st Century Blues
"Escapism" (featuring 070 Shake)	2022	1	3	9	35	3	1	4	4	22	7	BPI: 4× Platinum; ARIA: 6× Platinum; BVMI: Platinum; GLF: Platinum; MC: 6× Platinum; RIAA: 4× Platinum; RMNZ: 4× Platinum; SNEP: Diamond	My 21st Century Blues
"The Thrill Is Gone"	2022	— (Note: "The Thrill Is Gone" did not enter the UK Singles Chart, but peaked at number 36 on the UK Singles Downloads Chart and the UK Singles Sales Chart.)	—	—	—	—	—	—	—	—	—		My 21st Century Blues
"Ice Cream Man"	2023	69	—	—	—	—	—	—	—	—	—		My 21st Century Blues
"Flip a Switch" (solo or featuring Coi Leray)	2023	35	—	—	—	—	36	—	—	—	—	BPI: Gold	My 21st Century Blues
"The Weekend" (with Stormzy)	2023	23	—	—	—	—	48	—	—	—	—	BPI: Silver; RMNZ: Gold	Non-album singles
"Prada" (with Cassö and D-Block Europe)	2023	2	3	50	16	1	1	1	1	—	21	BPI: 3× Platinum; ARIA: 5× Platinum; BVMI: 2× Platinum; GLF: Platinum; MC: Gold; RIAA: Gold; RMNZ: 3× Platinum; SNEP: Diamond	Non-album singles
"Worth It"	2023	33	—	—	—	—	60	—	—	—	—	BPI: Platinum; ARIA: Gold; MC: Gold; RMNZ: Platinum	My 21st Century Blues
"Genesis"	2024	22	—	—	—	—	53	—	—	—	—		Non-album singles
"Moi" (with Central Cee)	2024	38	—	—	—	—	72	—	— (Note: "Moi" did not enter the Swedish Singellista Chart, but peaked at number 20 on the Swedish Heatseeker Chart.)	—	—		Non-album singles
"Oscar Winning Tears"	2024	52	—	—	—	—	58	—	—	—	—	BPI: Gold; ARIA: Gold; MC: Gold; RMNZ: Gold	My 21st Century Blues
"Suzanne" (with Mark Ronson)	2025	34	—	—	—	—	—	—	—	—	—	BPI: Silver	Non-album single
"Where Is My Husband!"	2025	1	3	5	14	2	2	3	6	11	6	BPI: 3× Platinum; ARIA: 4× Platinum; GLF: Gold; MC: 3× Platinum; RIAA: 2× Platinum; RMNZ: 3× Platinum; SNEP: Diamond	This Music May Contain Hope
"Nightingale Lane"	2026	20	—	—	—	—	61	82	—	—	—		This Music May Contain Hope
"Click Clack Symphony" (featuring Hans Zimmer)	2026	11	42	61	116	53	16	24	55	— (Note: "Click Clack Symphony" did not chart on the Billboard Hot 100 but did peak at number 2 on the Bubbling Under Hot 100 chart.)	68	BPI: Silver	This Music May Contain Hope
"Joy" (featuring Amma and Absolutely)	2026	93	—	—	—	—	—	—	—	—	—		This Music May Contain Hope
"—" denotes a recording that did not chart or was not released in that territory.

=== As featured artist ===
List of singles as featured artist, with selected chart positions and certifications, showing year released and associated album name
Title	Year	Peak chart positions										Certifications	Album
Title	Year	UK	AUS	CAN	FRA	GER	IRE	NLD	SWE	SWI	US	Certifications	Album
"By Your Side" (Jonas Blue featuring Raye)	2016	15	33	—	110	45	13	35	94	50	—	BPI: Platinum; ARIA: 2× Platinum; BVMI: Gold; RIAA: Gold; RMNZ: Platinum; SNEP: Gold	Blue
"You Don't Know Me" (Jax Jones featuring Raye)	2016	3	12	70	2	3	3	8	6	5	—	BPI: 3× Platinum; ARIA: 3× Platinum; BVMI: 3× Gold; GLF: 2× Platinum; MC: 2× Platinum; RIAA: Gold; RMNZ: 2× Platinum; SNEP: Diamond	Snacks
"Bridge over Troubled Water" (as part of Artists for Grenfell)	2017	1	53	—	111	25	—	—	—	28	—	BPI: Gold	Non-album single
"Glue" Somewhere Else featuring Raye	2017	—	—	—	—	—	—	—	—	—	—		Non-album single
"Tied Up" (Major Lazer featuring Mr Eazi and Raye)	2018	—	—	—	—	—	—	—	—	—	—		Major Lazer Essentials
"Tipsy" (Odunsi the Engine featuring Raye)	2019	—	—	—	—	—	—	—	—	—	—		Non-album singles
"Stay (Don't Go Away)" (David Guetta featuring Raye)	2019	41	88	— (Note: "Stay (Don't Go Away)" did not enter the Billboard Canadian Hot 100 but peaked at number 49 on the Canadian Digital Song Sales chart.)	155	—	42	—	72	—	—	BPI: Silver; SNEP: Gold	Non-album singles
"Thank You" (Pvris featuring Raye)	2020	—	—	—	—	—	—	—	—	—	—		Use Me
"Ferrari Horses" (D-Block Europe featuring Raye)	2021	14	—	—	—	—	27	—	—	—	—	BPI: Platinum	The Blue Print: Us vs. Them
"Go Girl" (Miraa May featuring Raye)	2021	—	—	—	—	—	—	—	—	—	—		Non-album singles
"Money Calling" (Da Beatfreakz featuring Russ Millions, Raye, and Wewantwraiths)	2021	48	—	—	—	—	—	—	—	—	—	BPI: Silver	Non-album singles
"You Can't Change Me" (David Guetta and Morten featuring Raye)	2022	—	—	—	—	—	—	—	—	—	—		Episode 2
"Born Again" (Lisa featuring Doja Cat and Raye)	2025	13	48	53	62	39	35	69	66	40	68	BPI: Silver; RIAA: Gold; RMNZ: Gold	Alter Ego
"—" denotes a recording that did not chart or was not released in that territory.

=== Promotional singles ===
List of promotional songs, with selected chart positions, showing year released and associated album name
Title	Year	Peak chart positions							Certifications	Album
Title	Year	UK	UK Indie	IRE	NLD	NOR	NZ Hot	WW Excl. US	Certifications	Album
"Flowers"	2015	—	—	—	—	—	—	—		Non-album singles
"Alien" (featuring Avelino)	2015	—	—	—	—	—	—	—		Non-album singles
"Shine"	2015	—	—	—	—	—	—	—		Non-album singles
"Distraction"	2016	—	—	—	—	—	—	—		Second
"Ambition" (featuring Stormzy)	2016	—	—	—	—	—	—	—		Second
"Sober (Stripped)"	2017	—	—	—	—	—	—	—		Non-album single
"Please Don't Touch"	2019	—	—	—	—	—	—	—		Euphoric Sad Songs
"All of My Love" (with Young Adz)	2020	—	—	—	—	—	—	—	BPI: Silver	Non-album singles
"O Holy Night"	2022	—	—	—	—	—	—	—		Non-album singles
"Mother Nature" (with Hans Zimmer)	2023	—	—	—	—	—	—	—		Non-album singles
"Fly Me to the Moon"	2024	—	—	—	—	—	—	—		Fly Me to the Moon
"What a Difference a Day Makes"	2025	—	—	—	—	—	—	—		Black Rabbit
"I Know You're Hurting"	2026	22	4	53	55	96	4	179		This Music May Contain Hope
"—" denotes a recording that did not chart or was not released in that territory.

== Other charted songs ==
List of other charted songs, with selected chart positions, showing year released and associated album name
Title	Year	Peak chart positions					Album
Title	Year	UK	UK Indie	IRE	NZ Hot	US Dance	Album
"Breaking News" (Louis the Child featuring Raye)	2018	—	—	—	—	45	Kids at Play
"Intro: Girl Under the Grey Cloud"	2026	—	34	—	—	—	This Music May Contain Hope
"I Will Overcome"	2026	—	15	—	9	—	This Music May Contain Hope
"Beware.. The South London Lover Boy"	2026	— (Note: "Beware.. The South London Lover Boy" did not enter the UK Singles Chart, however it peaked at number 93 on the UK Streaming Chart.)	10	—	—	—	This Music May Contain Hope
"The WhatsApp Shakespeare"	2026	— (Note: "The WhatsApp Shakespeare" did not enter the UK Singles Chart, however it peaked at number 86 on the UK Streaming Chart.)	9	—	8	—	This Music May Contain Hope
"Winter Woman"	2026	— (Note: "Winter Woman" did not enter the UK Singles Chart, however it peaked at number 100 on the UK Streaming Chart.)	14	—	7	—	This Music May Contain Hope
"Life Boat"	2026	—	15	72	—	—	This Music May Contain Hope
"I Hate the Way I Look Today"	2026	—	46	—	—	—	This Music May Contain Hope
"Goodbye Henry" (featuring Al Green)	2026	—	23	—	—	—	This Music May Contain Hope
"Skin & Bones"	2026	—	28	—	—	—	This Music May Contain Hope
"—" denotes a recording that did not chart or was not released in that territory.

== Guest appearances ==
List of non-charting, non-single guest appearances, showing year released, other artist(s), and associated album name
Title	Year	Other artist(s)	Album
"Ego"	2015	Chris Loco	See No Evil – EP
"War"	2016	Nas	The Birth of A Nation: The Inspired By Album
"After the Afterparty (VIP Mix)"	2017	Charli XCX, Rita Ora, Stefflon Don	Non-album remix
"Dreamer"	2017	Charli XCX, Starrah	Number 1 Angel
"Body Language"	2017	Pete Tong, Jules Buckley, Heritage Orchestra	Ibiza Classics
"Breaking News"	2018	Louis the Child	Kids At Play
"The Fruits"	2019	Col3trane, DJDS	Heroine
"1by1"	2019	Rudimental, Maleek Berry	Toast to Our Differences
"Odo"	2019	King Promise	As Promised
"South East London"	2019	—N/a	Rapman Presents: Blue Story (Music Inspired By the Original Motion Picture)
"Midnight Strikes"	2021	Amorphous	Things Take Shape
"Kiss My (Uh-Oh) (Girl Power Remix)"	2021	Anne-Marie, Little Mix, Becky Hill, Stefflon Don	Non-album remix
"Wys"	2021	Tion Wayne	Green With Envy
"Better Things (Raye remix)"	2023	Aespa	Non-album remix
"Paralyzed"	2024	Lucky Daye	Algorithm
"Grandma Calls the Boys Bad News"	2025	—N/a	F1 the Album
"Perfect Day"	2026	Al Green	To Love Somebody

== Music videos ==
List of music video appearances, indicating, where applicable, the year, other performer(s), and director(s)
Title	Year	Other performer(s)	Director(s)	Ref.
"Alien"	2015	Avelino	Unknown	
"Ego"	2015	Chris Loco	Chris West and Vanessa McDonnell	
"Sing About Me"	2016	—N/a	Unknown	
"I, U, Us"	2016	—N/a	Charli XCX	
"Shhh"	2016	—N/a	Dan Massie	
"By Your Side"	2016	Jonas Blue	Arni & Kinski	
"You Don't Know Me"	2017	Jax Jones	Unknown	
"The Line"	2017	—N/a	Unknown	
"Decline"	2017	Mr Eazi	Sing J Lee	
"Body Language"	2017	Pete Tong, Heritage Orchestra, Jules Buckley	Unknown	
"Check"	2018	Kojo Funds	Unknown	
"Cigarette"	2018	Mabel, Stefflon Don	Unknown	
"Confidence"	2018	Maleek Berry, Nana Rogues	Walid Labri	
"Friends"	2018	—N/a	Unknown	
"Tied Up"	2018	Major Lazer, Mr Eazi, Jake Gosling	Adriaan Louw	
"Tipsy"	2019	Odunsi	Dir. LX	
"Stay (Don't Go Away)"	2019	David Guetta	Ethan Lader	
"Love Me Again"	2019	—N/a	Unknown	
"Tequila"	2020	Jax Jones, Martin Solveig	Unknown	
"All of My Love"	2020	Young Adz	Unknown	
"Secrets"	2020	Regard	Harry Lindley	
"Natalie Don't"	2020	—N/a	Fiona Jane Burgess	
"Love of Your Life"	2020	—N/a	Fiona Jane Burgess	
"Regardless"	2021	Rudimental	Unknown	
"Bed"	2021	Joel Corry, David Guetta	Elliot Simpson	
"Call On Me"	2021	—N/a	Sophia Ray	
"Go Girl"	2021	Miraa May	Sheena Brobbey	
"I Don't Want You"	2021	Riton	Unknown	
"Hard Out Here"	2022	—N/a	Unknown	
"Black Mascara"	2022	—N/a	Unknown	
"Escapism"	2022	070 Shake	Raye, Otis Dominique	
"Ice Cream Man"	2023	—N/a	Raye	
"Flip a Switch"	2023	Coi Leray	Otis Dominique	
"The Weekend"	2023	Stormzy	Omar Jones	
"Genesis"	2024	—N/a	Raye, Otis Dominique	
"Born Again"	2025	Lisa, Doja Cat	Bardia Zeinali	
"Where Is My Husband!"	2025	—N/a	The Reids	
"Click Clack Symphony"	2026	Hans Zimmer	Dave Meyers	

== Songwriting credits ==
indicates a background vocal contribution.

indicates an uncredited lead vocal contribution.

indicates a credited vocal/featured artist contribution.

Year	Artist	Album	Song
2015	Blonde	Non-album single	"All Cried Out" (featuring Alex Newell)
2015	Loco	See No Evil EP	"Ego" (featuring Raye)
2015	Matoma	Hakuna Matoma	"The Wave" (featuring Madcon)
2016	SG Lewis	Yours EP	"Yours"
2016	Charli XCX	Non-album singles	"After the Afterparty" (featuring Lil Yachty)
2016	M.O	Non-album singles	"Not in Love" (featuring Kent Jones)
2016	Jax Jones	Snacks EP	"You Don't Know Me" (featuring Raye)
2017	Snakehips	Non-album single	"Don't Leave" (with MØ)
2017	Charli XCX	Number 1 Angel	"Dreamer" (featuring Starrah & Raye)
2017	5 After Midnight	Non-album singles	"Up in Here"
2017	Blonde	Non-album singles	"Just for One Night" (featuring Astrid S)
2017	Sweater Beats	For the Cold EP	"Glory Days" (featuring Hayley Kiyoko)
2017	Dev	I Only See You When I'm Dreamin'	"Come at Me"
2017	Tieks	Non-album single	"Say a Prayer" (featuring Chaka Khan & Popcaan)
2017	Justine Skye	Ultraviolet	"Don't Think About It"
2017	Somewhere Else	Non-album single	"Glue" (featuring Raye)
2017	Little Mix	Glory Days: Platinum Edition	"If I Get My Way"
2018	Hailee Steinfeld	Fifty Shades Freed OST	"Capital Letters" (with BloodPop)
2018	Rita Ora	Non-album single	"Proud"
2018	Madison Beer	As She Pleases EP	"Home with You"
2018	John Legend	Non-album single	"A Good Night" (featuring BloodPop)
2018	PrettyMuch	PrettyMuch an EP	"On My Way"
2018	Jessie Reyez	Being Human in Public EP	"Bodycount (Remix)" (featuring Kehlani and Normani)
2018	XYLØ	Non-album single	"Tears & Tantrums"
2018	Major Lazer	Major Lazer Essentials	"Tied Up" (featuring Raye, Jake Gosling and Mr Eazi)
2018	Quavo	Quavo Huncho	"Swing" (featuring Normani and Davido)
2018	Louis the Child	Kids at Play EP	"Breaking News" (featuring Raye)
2018	Little Mix	LM5	"Told You So"
2019	Rudimental	Toast to Our Differences	"1by1" (featuring Raye and Maleek Berry)
2019	Odunsi the Engine	Non-album singles	"Tipsy" (featuring Raye)
2019	Jack Back	Non-album singles	"Put Your Phone Down (Low)"
2019	Ellie Goulding	Brightest Blue	"Sixteen"
2019	David Guetta	Non-album singles	"Stay (Don't Go Away)" (featuring Raye)
2019	Cheat Codes	Non-album singles	"I Feel Ya" (with Ina Wroldsen and Danny Quest)
2019	Beyoncé	The Lion King: The Gift	"Bigger"
2019	King Promise	As Promised	"Odo"
2020	Regard	Euphoric Sad Songs	"Secrets" (with Raye)
2020	D-Block Europe	The Blue Print: Us vs. Them	"Proud"
2021	Madison Beer	Life Support	"Default"
2021	Madison Beer	Life Support	"Follow the White Rabbit"
2021	Sofia Carson	Sofia Carson	"Fool's Gold"
2021	Anitta	Versions of Me	"Girl From Rio"
2021	Shift K3Y, Tinashe	Non-album single	"Love Line"
2021	Zara Larsson	Poster Girl (Summer Edition)	"Last Summer"
2021	Anne-Marie	Therapy	"x2"
2021	Anne-Marie	Therapy	"Breathing"
2021	Mabel	About Last Night...	"Let Them Know"
2022	Mabel	About Last Night...	"About Last Night..." (intro)
2022	Mabel	About Last Night...	"Animal"
2022	Mabel	About Last Night...	"Take Your Name" (interlude)
2022	Mabel	About Last Night...	"Let Love Go" (featuring Lil Tecca)
2022	Mabel	About Last Night...	"When the Party's Over"
2022	Mabel	About Last Night...	"LOL"
2023	Mahalia	IRL	"Terms & Conditions"
2023	Aespa	Better Things	"Better Things"
2023	Alok	Non-album single	"Car Keys (Ayla)" (featuring Ava Max)
2024	Jennifer Lopez	This Is Me... Now	"Dear Ben Pt. II"
2024	Beyoncé	Cowboy Carter	"Riiverdance"
2024	The Blessed Madonna and Kylie Minogue	Godspeed and Tension II	"Edge of Saturday Night"
2024	Rita Ora	Non-album single	"Ask & You Shall Receive"
2024	Jade	That's Showbiz Baby!	"Midnight Cowboy"
2025	Jade	That's Showbiz Baby!	"FUFN (Fuck You for Now)"
2025	Jade	That's Showbiz Baby!	"Silent Disco"
2025	Halle	Love?... or Something Like It	"Braveface"
2025	Halle	Love?... or Something Like It	"Bite Your Lip"
2025	Halle	Love?... or Something Like It	"Know About Me"
2025	Halle	Love?... or Something Like It	"Because I Love You"
2025	Say Now	Non-album single	"Supermarket"
2026	Sonny Fodera	Can We Do It All Again?	"Let Me Be in Your Arms" (featuring Libianca)
