= List of awards and nominations received by Raye =

Raye awards and nominations
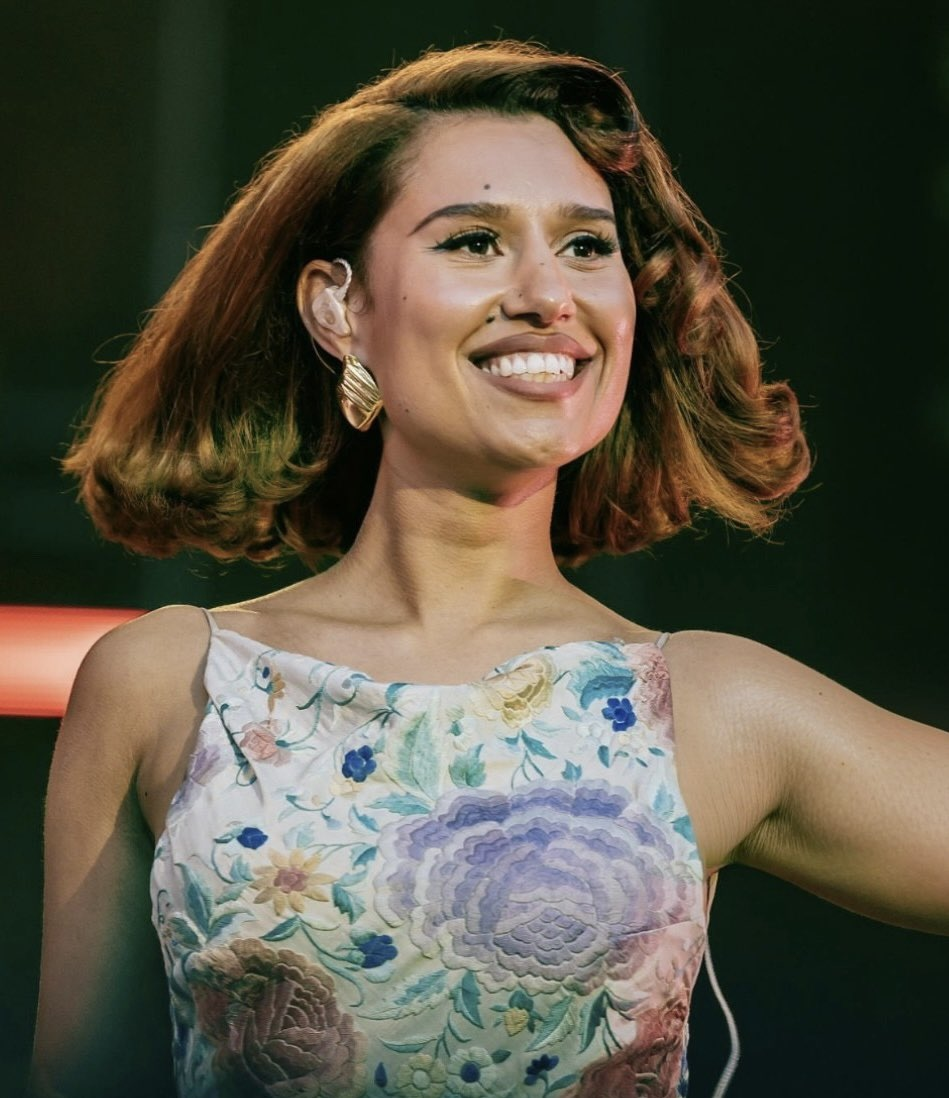
- Raye performing in 2025
Awards and nominations
Award	Wins	Nominations
AIM Independent Music Awards	1	4
American Music Awards	0	1
ASCAP London Music Awards	1	1
Asian Pop Music Awards	0	1
BET Awards	0	2
BMI London Awards	3	3
BMI Pop Awards	1	1
BreakTudo Awards	0	2
Brit Awards	7	15
Brit Billion Awards	1	1
Electronic Music Awards	0	1
Global Awards	4	12
Grammy Awards	0	4
Harper's Bazaar Woman of the Year	1	1
The Headies	0	1
iHeartRadio Music Awards	0	5
Ivor Novello Awards	2	7
Mercury Prize	1	2
MOBO Awards	2	7
MTV Europe Music Awards	2	5
MTV Video Music Awards	1	2
Popjustice £20 Music Prize	0	3
The Recording Academy	1	1
Rockbjörnen	0	1
Rolling Stone UK Awards	0	2
Songwriters Hall of Fame	1	1
The South Bank Sky Arts Awards	1	1
Trace Awards & Festival	0	1
UK Music Video Awards	0	6
Urban Music Awards	1	3

Totals (Note: Certain award groups do not simply award one winner. They acknowledge several different recipients, have runners-up, and have third place. Since this is a specific recognition and is different from losing an award, runner-up mentions are considered wins in this award tally. For simplification and to avoid errors, each award in this list has been presumed to have had a prior nomination.)
- Wins: 30
- Nominations: 96

The British singer-songwriter Raye has won numerous accolades throughout her career, including seven Brit Awards, four Global Awards, two Ivor Novello Awards, two MTV Europe Music Awards, and one MTV Video Music Award. She received the Hal David Starlight Award from the Songwriters Hall of Fame and the Harry Belafonte Best Song for Social Change Award from the Recording Academy, the latter for her songwriting on "Ice Cream Man".

Raye won her first award at the 2017 MTV Europe Music Awards as part of the Artists for Grenfell charity single "Bridge over Troubled Water". "You Don't Know Me", a collaboration with Jax Jones, earned Raye her first nomination at the Brit Awards in 2018; she later earned additional Brit Award nominations for the collaborations "Secrets" with Regard and "Bed" with Joel Corry and David Guetta.

At the 2024 Brit Awards, Raye set a record for the most wins by an artist in a single ceremony, winning six awards. These included British Album of the Year for My 21st Century Blues, Song of the Year for "Escapism", British Artist of the Year, and Songwriter of the Year, for which she became the first female recipient. She later received her first MTV Video Music Award nomination for "Genesis" and three nominations at the 2025 Grammy Awards, including Best New Artist and Songwriter of the Year, Non-Classical. Raye's single "Where Is My Husband!" won the MOBO Award for Video of the Year, while "Born Again", a collaboration with Lisa and Doja Cat, won the MTV Video Music Award for Best K-Pop. 2026 Mercury prize winner for Raye’s second album ‘This music may contain hope’ released in March 2026.

== Awards and nominations ==
List of award nominations, with the year of ceremony, recipient(s), category, and result
Award	Year (Note: Indicates the year of ceremony. Each year is linked to the article about the awards held that year, wherever possible.)	Nominee(s) / Work(s)	Category	Result	Ref.
AIM Independent Music Awards	2023	My 21st Century Blues	Best Independent Album	Nominated	
AIM Independent Music Awards	2023	"Escapism" (featuring 070 Shake)	Best Independent Track	Won	
AIM Independent Music Awards	2023	"Escapism" (featuring 070 Shake)	Best Independent Video	Nominated	
AIM Independent Music Awards	2024	Herself	Best Live Performer	Nominated	
American Music Awards	2026	"Where Is My Husband!"	Best Vocal Performance	Nominated	
ASCAP London Music Awards	2018	"You Don't Know Me" (Jax Jones featuring Raye)	ASCAP EDM Winning Songs	Won	
Asian Pop Music Awards	2025	"Born Again" (Lisa featuring Doja Cat and Raye)	Record of the Year	Nominated	
Berlin Music Video Awards	2026	"Where Is My Husband"	Best Concept	Nominated	
BET Awards	2023	Herself	Best New International Act	Nominated	
BET Awards	2026	Herself	Best New Artist	Nominated	
BMI London Awards	2019	Herself	BMI Impact Award	Won	
BMI London Awards	2019	"Home with You"	Most-Performed Songs of the Year	Won	
BMI London Awards	2024	"Escapism" (featuring 070 Shake)	Most-Performed Songs of the Year	Won	
BMI Pop Awards	2024	"Escapism" (featuring 070 Shake)	Most-Performed Songs of the Year	Won	
BreakTudo Awards	2024	Herself	International Artist on the Rise	Nominated	
BreakTudo Awards	2025	"Born Again" (Lisa featuring Doja Cat and Raye)	International Collaboration of the Year	Nominated	
Brit Awards	2018	"You Don't Know Me" (Jax Jones featuring Raye)	Song of the Year	Nominated	
Brit Awards	2021	"Secrets" (with Regard)	Song of the Year	Nominated	
Brit Awards	2022	"Bed" (with Joel Corry and David Guetta)	Song of the Year	Nominated	
Brit Awards	2022	Herself	Best Dance Act	Nominated	
Brit Awards	2024	Herself	British Artist of the Year	Won	
Brit Awards	2024	Herself	Best New Artist	Won	
Brit Awards	2024	Herself	Songwriter of the Year	Won	
Brit Awards	2024	Herself	Best Pop Act	Nominated	
Brit Awards	2024	Herself	Best R&B Act	Won	
Brit Awards	2024	My 21st Century Blues	British Album of the Year	Won	
Brit Awards	2024	"Escapism" (featuring 070 Shake)	Song of the Year	Won	
Brit Awards	2024	"Prada" (with Cassö & D-Block Europe)	Song of the Year	Nominated	
Brit Awards	2025	Herself	Best R&B Act	Won	
Brit Awards	2026	Herself	Best Pop Act	Nominated	
Brit Awards	2026	"Where Is My Husband!"	Song of the Year	Nominated	
British Phonographic Industry	2023	Herself	Brit Billion Award	Won	
Electronic Music Awards	2023	Herself	Best Vocalist	Nominated	
Global Awards	2022	Herself	Best Female	Nominated	
Global Awards	2023	Herself	Best Female	Nominated	
Global Awards	2023	Herself	Best British Act	Nominated	
Global Awards	2023	Herself	Best Hip-Hop or RnB	Nominated	
Global Awards	2023	"Escapism" (featuring 070 Shake)	Best Social Trended Song	Won	
Global Awards	2023	"Escapism" (featuring 070 Shake)	Best Song	Nominated	
Global Awards	2024	"Prada" (with Cassö and D-Block Europe)	Best Song	Won	
Global Awards	2024	Herself	Best Female	Nominated	
Global Awards	2024	Herself	Best British Act	Won	
Global Awards	2024	Herself	Best Pop	Won	
Global Awards	2024	Herself	Best RnB or Hip Hop	Nominated	
Global Awards	2024	Herself	Best Fans	Nominated	
Grammy Awards	2025	Herself	Best New Artist	Nominated	
Grammy Awards	2025	Herself	Songwriter of the Year, Non-Classical	Nominated	
Grammy Awards	2025	Algorithm (Lucky Daye)	Best Engineered Album, Non-Classical (as engineer)	Nominated	
Grammy Awards	2026	Live at the Royal Albert Hall	Best Music Film	Nominated	
Grammy Awards	2027	"Where Is My Husband!"	Record of the Year	Pending	
Grammy Awards	2027	"Where Is My Husband!"	Song of the Year	Pending	
Grammy Awards	2027	"Where Is My Husband!"	Best Pop Solo Performance	Pending	
Grammy Awards	2027	This Music May Contain Hope	Album of the Year	Pending	
Grammy Awards	2027	This Music May Contain Hope	Best Pop Vocal Album	Pending	
Grammy Awards	2027	Herself	Songwriter of the Year, Non-Classical	Pending	
Grammy Awards	2027	"Click Clack Symphony"	Best Pop Duo/Group Performance	Pending	
Grammy Awards	2027	"Click Clack Symphony"	Best Arrangement, Instrumental and Vocals	Pending	
Grammy Awards	2027	"Click Clack Symphony"	Best Music Video	Pending	
Grammy Awards	2027	"Life Boat"	Best Dance Pop Recording	Pending	
Grammy Awards	2027	"I Hate The Way I Look Today"	Best Traditional Pop Vocal Performance	Pending	
Harper's Bazaar Woman of the Year	2024	Herself	Musician of the Year	Won	
The Headies	2019	"Tipsy" (Odunsi the Engine featuring Raye)	Best R&B Single	Nominated	
iHeartRadio Music Awards	2022	"Bed"	Dance Song of the Year	Nominated	
iHeartRadio Music Awards	2024	My 21st Century Blues	Favorite Debut Album	Nominated	
iHeartRadio Music Awards	2026	"Where Is My Husband!"	Best Lyrics	Nominated	
iHeartRadio Music Awards	2026	"Born Again" (Lisa featuring Doja Cat and Raye)	Best Music Video	Nominated	
iHeartRadio Music Awards	2026	"Born Again" (Lisa featuring Doja Cat and Raye)	Favorite K-pop Collab	Nominated	
Ivor Novello Awards	2022	"Bed" (with Joel Corry and David Guetta)	Most Performed Work	Nominated	
Ivor Novello Awards	2022	Herself	Songwriter of the Year	Nominated	
Ivor Novello Awards	2023	"Escapism" (with 070 Shake)	Best Contemporary Song	Won	
Ivor Novello Awards	2024	My 21st Century Blues	Best Album	Nominated	
Ivor Novello Awards	2024	Herself	Songwriter of the Year	Won	
Ivor Novello Awards	2025	"Prada" (with Cassö and D-Block Europe)	Most Performed Work	Nominated	
Ivor Novello Awards	2025	"Genesis"	Best Song Musically and Lyrically	Nominated	
Mercury Prize	2023	My 21st Century Blues	Album of the Year	Shortlisted	
Mercury Prize	2026	This Music May Contain Hope	Album of the Year	Won	
MOBO Awards	2024	My 21st Century Blues	Album of the Year	Nominated	
MOBO Awards	2024	"Escapism" (featuring 070 Shake)	Song of the Year	Nominated	
MOBO Awards	2024	Herself	Best Female Act	Won	
MOBO Awards	2025	Herself	Best Female Act	Nominated	
MOBO Awards	2025	"Genesis"	Video of the Year	Nominated	
MOBO Awards	2026	"Where Is My Husband!"	Video of the Year	Won	
MOBO Awards	2026	"Where Is My Husband!"	Song of the Year	Nominated	
MTV Europe Music Awards	2017	Artists for Grenfell	Power of Music Award	Won	
MTV Europe Music Awards	2023	Herself	Best UK & Ireland Act	Nominated	
MTV Europe Music Awards	2024	Herself	Best UK & Ireland Act	Won	
MTV Europe Music Awards	2024	Herself	Best Artist	Nominated	
MTV Europe Music Awards	2024	Herself	Best Live	Nominated	
MTV Video Music Awards	2024	"Genesis"	Video for Good	Nominated	
MTV Video Music Awards	2025	"Born Again" (Lisa featuring Doja Cat and Raye)	Best K-Pop	Won	
MTV Video Music Awards	2026	"Where Is My Husband!"	Song of the Year	Nominated	
MTV Video Music Awards	2026	"Click Clack Symphony" (with Hans Zimmer)	Best Visual Effects	Nominated	
Nickelodeon Kids' Choice Awards	2026	"Where Is My Husband!"	Favorite Viral Song	Pending	
Nickelodeon Kids' Choice Awards	2026	Herself	Favorite Female Breakout Artist/Group	Pending	
NRJ Music Awards	2026	Herself	International Female Artist of the Year	Nominated	
Popjustice £20 Music Prize	2020	"Please Don't Touch"	Best British Pop Single	Shortlisted	
Popjustice £20 Music Prize	2021	"Love of Your Life"	Best British Pop Single	Shortlisted	
Popjustice £20 Music Prize	2023	"Escapism" (featuring 070 Shake)	Best British Pop Single	Shortlisted	
The Recording Academy	2026	"Ice Cream Man"	Harry Belafonte Best Song for Social Change Award (as songwriter)	Honored	
Rockbjörnen	2024	"Prada"	Foreign Song of the Year	Nominated	
Rolling Stone UK Awards	2024	"Prada"	Song of the Year	Nominated	
Rolling Stone UK Awards	2024	"Genesis"	Song of the Year	Nominated	
Songwriters Hall of Fame	2026	Herself	Hal David Starlight Award	Won	
The South Bank Sky Arts Awards	2023	My 21st Century Blues	Pop Music Award	Won	
Trace Awards & Festival	2023	Herself	Best Artist – UK	Nominated	
UK Music Video Awards	2023	"Escapism" (featuring 070 Shake)	Best Pop Video – UK	Nominated	
UK Music Video Awards	2023	"The Weekend" (with Stormzy)	Best R&B/Soul Video – UK	Nominated	
UK Music Video Awards	2024	"Genesis"	Best Pop Video – UK	Nominated	
UK Music Video Awards	2024	"Genesis"	Best Performance in a Video	Nominated	
UK Music Video Awards	2024	"Genesis"	Best Cinematography in a Video	Nominated	
UK Music Video Awards	2024	"Oscar Winning Tears (Live at the Royal Albert Hall)"	Best Live Video	Nominated	
UK Music Video Awards	2026	"Nightingale Lane (Live from Abbey Road Studios)"	Best Live Video	Nominated	
Urban Music Awards	2018	Herself	Best Newcomer	Nominated	
Urban Music Awards	2023	Herself	Best Female Act	Nominated	
Urban Music Awards	2023	"The Thrill Is Gone"	Best Single	Won	

== Listicles ==
Name of publisher, name of listicle, year(s) listed, recipient(s), and placement result
Publisher	Listicle	Year(s)	Recipient(s)	Result	Ref.
BBC	100 Women	2024	Raye	Unranked	
BBC	Sound of 2017	2017	Raye	3rd	
Billboard	The 50 Best Albums of 2023	2023	My 21st Century Blues	34th	
Billboard	The 100 Best Songs of 2023	2023	"Escapism" (featuring 070 Shake)	20th	
Billboard	The 10 Best U.K. & Ireland Songs of 2024	2024	"Genesis"	Unranked	
Business Insider	The Best Albums of 2023	2023	My 21st Century Blues	4th	
Business Insider	The Best Songs of 2024	2023	"Genesis"	5th	
Complex	The 50 Best Songs of 2023	2023	"Flip a Switch" (featuring Coi Leray)	38th	
Consequence	The 50 Best Albums of 2023	2023	My 21st Century Blues	22nd	
Consequence	The 200 Best Songs of 2025	2025	"Where Is My Husband!"	129th	
DIY	DIY's Albums of the Year 2023	2023	My 21st Century Blues	19th	
DIY	DIY's 2025 Tracks of the Year	2025	"Where Is My Husband!"	17th	
Dork	Dork's Top 50 Albums of 2023	2023	My 21st Century Blues	35th	
Esquire	The Best Albums of 2023	2023	My 21st Century Blues	6th	
The Forty-Five	The 45 Best Albums of 2023	2023	My 21st Century Blues	41st	
The Guardian	The 20 Best Songs of 2025	2025	"Where Is My Husband!"	17th	
The Independent	The 30 Best Albums of 2023	2023	My 21st Century Blues	10th	
The Independent	The Independent's Favourite Songs of 2025	2025	"Where Is My Husband!"	Unranked	
Madame Tussauds	Hot 100	2025	Raye	Unranked	
Rolling Stone	The 100 Best Songs of 2024	2024	"Genesis"	16th	
NME	The 50 Best Songs of 2025	2025	"Where Is My Husband!"	18th	
Rough Trade	The Best Songs of 2025	2025	"Where Is My Husband!"	Unranked	
The Telegraph	The 10 Best Albums of 2023	2023	My 21st Century Blues	1st	
Uproxx	The Best Albums of 2023	2023	My 21st Century Blues	Unranked	
Variety	The Best Albums of 2023	2023	My 21st Century Blues	8th	
Variety	The Best Songs of 2023	2023	"Environmental Anxiety (Live at the Royal Albert Hall)"	Unranked	
Variety	The Best Songs of 2025	2025	"Where Is My Husband!"	Unranked	
