= My 21st Century Symphony (Live at the Royal Albert Hall) =

2023 live album by Raye

Live album by Raye and Heritage Orchestra
- Released: 16 October 2023
- Recorded: 26 September 2023
- Venue: Royal Albert Hall (London, United Kingdom)
- Label: Warner Chappell Music; Human Re Sources
- Producer: Raye; Di Genius; Gianluca Buccellati; Mike Sabath; Pete Clements; Pete Miller; Punctual; Tom Richards

Raye chronology
My 21st Century Blues (2023)	My 21st Century Symphony (Live at the Royal Albert Hall) (2023)	Live at Montreux Jazz Festival (2024)

My 21st Century Symphony (Live at the Royal Albert Hall) is the first live album by English singer-songwriter Raye, recorded on 26 September 2023 at the Royal Albert Hall in London. The album spent two weeks on the UK Albums Chart and peaked at number 83.

Accompanied by the Heritage Orchestra and the Flames Collective, a 30-member gospel choir, Raye presented a symphonic reinvention of her album My 21st Century Blues, captured in a live recording.

The original album was released in February 2023, coinciding with the success of the well-received song "Escapism". Other tracks on the album, such as "Oscar Winning Tears" and "Ice Cream Man", were also praised for their creative storytelling and emotional performance.

On Instagram, Raye shared her enthusiasm for the live recording, calling it "the most magnificent thing" she has ever created, and expressing the hope that listeners will be able to enjoy it wherever they are.

The concert was broadcast for the first time in the UK on 3 January 2024 on BBC.

== Track listing ==
All lyrics are written by Raye, Tom Richards, and Mike Sabath.

No.	Title	Length
1.	"Overture"	1:37
2.	"Oscar Winning Tears"	3:20
3.	"Hard Out Here"	3:38
4.	"The Thrill Is Gone Requiem"	2:23
5.	"The Thrill Is Gone"	4:13
6.	"Five Star Hotels"	4:51
7.	"Mary Jane vs Graeme Blevins"	1:31
8.	"Mary Jane"	4:42
9.	"Environmental Anxiety"	3:55
10.	"Body Dysmorphia"	3:50
11.	"Ice Cream Man"	6:03
12.	"Dani's Interlude"	1:04
13.	"Flip a Switch"	3:45
14.	"Worth It Prelude"	1:11
15.	"Worth It"	4:57
16.	"Black Mascara"	4:12
17.	"Buss It Down"	4:30
18.	"Escapism"	7:01
Total length:		66:50

== Charts ==
Chart performance for My 21st Century Symphony (Live at the Royal Albert Hall)
Chart (2024)	Peak position
Scottish Albums (Official Charts)	49
UK Albums (Official Charts)	83

== Release history ==
Release history for My 21st Century Symphony (Live at the Royal Albert Hall)
Region	Release date	Formats	Ref.
Various	16 October 2023	Digital download; streaming	
Various	15 November 2024	CD; DVD; CD/DVD; Blu-ray; Vinyl	
