= Worth It (Raye song) =

2023 single by Raye

Single by Raye

from the album My 21st Century Blues
- Released: 10 November 2023
- Genre: R&B; Jazz-pop; Funk
- Length: 4:06
- Label: Human Re Sources
- Songwriters: John Hill; Rachel Keen; Akil King; Mike Sabath
- Producer: Mike Sabath

Raye singles chronology
"Prada" (2023)	"Worth It" (2023)	"Genesis" (2024)

Visualiser video
- "Worth It" on YouTube

"Worth It" is a song by the British singer-songwriter Raye from her debut studio album, My 21st Century Blues (2023). She wrote the song alongside Akil King, Mike Sabath, and John Hill, and it was produced by Raye and Sabath. It first became available as the album's thirteenth track on 3 February 2023, when its parent album was released independently through Human Re Sources, and was later digitally issued as the album's sixth single on 10 November 2023.

== Background and release ==
Raye signed a four-album recording contract with Polydor Records at 17 years old. She started writing songs for her debut album shortly after, including "Worth It" at 20. In 2021, the singer stated that the label prevented her from releasing an album and she turned into "less of a priority". She later parted ways from the label and became an independent artist. She signed a contract with the distribution company Human Re Sources the following year.

Following a string of singles, Raye announced her debut album, My 21st Century Blues, and later revealed its track listing, on which "Worth It" appears as the thirteenth song. The album was independently released on 3 February 2023, through Human Re Sources. "Worth It" was officially released as the sixth single from the album on 10 November 2023.

== Composition ==
"Worth It" is a funk-inspired song in which Raye wondering if the person she loves will be worth giving up her time for. Discussing the song, Raye stated, "I wanted to release this a long time ago. Sometimes there are moments where it’s like, ‘Here comes someone-let’s make all of the shit things feel really cool. And all this work that I’m supposed to be doing on myself, I might pause for a section and start putting some work into this other thing because it feels really nice.’ I wanted to have this near the end of the album-a warm hug as you are leaving some of those darker earlier things. The irony is in putting it just before “Buss It Down.” because it didn’t fucking work out!" Raye also called it the "happiest song on the album". The song namechecks actress Elizabeth Taylor.

== Live performances ==
Raye included the song on the setlist of her My 21st Century Blues Tour (2023–2024) and her This Tour May Contain New Music tour (2026). A live rendition of the song featuring the Heritage Orchestra was included on her live album My 21st Century Symphony (Live at the Royal Albert Hall), which was recorded on 26 September 2023 and released on 16 October 2023. On 6 April 2024, Raye performed "Worth It" and "Escapism" on Saturday Night Live. Another live version appeared on Raye's Live at Montreux Jazz Festival album, which was recorded during her set at the festival on 18 July 2024 and was released on 13 September that year.

== Charts ==
Chart performance for "Worth It"
Chart (2024–2025)	Peak position
Ireland (IRMA)	60
UK Singles (Official Charts)	33
UK Indie (Official Charts)	7

== Certifications ==
Certifications for "Worth It"
Region	Certification	Certified units/sales
Australia (ARIA)	Gold	35,000^{‡}
Canada (Music Canada)	Gold	40,000^{‡}
New Zealand (RMNZ)	Platinum	30,000^{‡}
United Kingdom (BPI)	Platinum	600,000^{‡}
^{‡} Sales+streaming figures based on certification alone.
