= Oscar Winning Tears =

2024 single by Raye

Single by Raye

from the album My 21st Century Blues
- Released: 8 November 2024
- Genre: Jazz
- Length: 3:03
- Label: Human Re Sources
- Songwriters: Rachel Keen; Mike Sabath
- Producer: Mike Sabath

Raye singles chronology
"Moi" (2024)	"Oscar Winning Tears" (2024)	"Born Again" (2025)

Visualiser video
- "Oscar Winning Tears" on YouTube

"Oscar Winning Tears" is a song by the British singer-songwriter Raye from her debut studio album, My 21st Century Blues (2023). She wrote it alongside its producer, Mike Sabath. It first became available as the album's second track on 3 February 2023, when it was released independently through Human Re Sources. On 8 November 2024, it was digitally issued as the album's seventh single. Musically, "Oscar Winning Tears" is a theatrical jazz song led by strings, piano, and drums. Its lyrics see the narrator ending an emotionally abusive and toxic relationship while confronting a former partner.

Upon its release as a single, the song peaked at numbers 52 in the United Kingdom and 58 in Ireland; it also reached airplay charts in the United States. Raye included "Oscar Winning Tears" on the set list of the My 21st Century Blues Tour (2023–2024). Other events where she performed the song include the 2024 MTV Europe Music Awards and the 67th Annual Grammy Awards; at the latter ceremony, it was included in a medley of songs from the Best New Artist nominees. Another live rendition of the song was included on her live album My 21st Century Symphony (Live at the Royal Albert Hall) (2023).

== Background and release ==
Raye signed a four-album recording contract with Polydor Records at 17 years old. She started writing songs for her debut album shortly after, including "Oscar Winning Tears" at 19. In 2021, the singer stated that the label prevented her from releasing an album and she turned into "less of a priority". She later parted ways from the label and became an independent artist. She signed a contract with the distribution company Human Re Sources the following year.

Following a string of singles, Raye announced her debut album, My 21st Century Blues, and later revealed its track listing, on which "Oscar Winning Tears" appears as the second song. She believed that it was one of the songs that had "stood the test of time". The album was independently released on 3 February 2023, through Human Re Sources. "Oscar Winning Tears" was issued as the album's seventh single on 8 November 2024 to digital platforms. The next month, Human Re Sources in partnership with The Orchard pushed the song to the US pop and rhythmic contemporary radio formats. The song peaked at number 52 in the United Kingdom and 58 in Ireland. It also reached numbers 26 and 35 on the US Rhythmic and Pop Airplay charts, respectively.

== Composition ==
Raye provided lead vocals and wrote "Oscar Winning Tears" with its producer, Mike Sabath. The latter also served as the engineer of the song and played drums, synthesizers, piano, and bass; he additionally was the string arranger alongside Adam Krevlin. Other musicians were Jacob Braun on cello and Paul Cartwright on violin. Jonathan Castelli and Josh Deguzman were the mixing engineers, while Jenna Felsenthal was the vocal recording engineer. The mastering engineer was Dale Becker, and the assistant engineers were Katie Harvey, Noah McCorkle, and Connor Hedge.

"Oscar Winning Tears" has a duration of three minutes and three seconds. It is placed in the album after its introduction, which depicts Raye in a jazz club. It is a jazz song, built over a theatrical and cinematic production with strings, piano, and drums. Raye's vocal performance includes belting, which was praised by critics. The lyrical content of the song see the narrator ending an emotionally abusive and toxic relationship. It was written after Raye saw a man spiking her drink; she felt that the process was liberating and served as medicine for her. Raye confronts a former partner who played the victim when she decided to end the relationship: "You was convincing though, very believable / The role that you played". She sings that the person "convinced [her] with bullshit"; The Guardian's Alexis Petridis believed it could be a reference to her experience of the music industry and her departure from Polydor.

== Live performances ==
Raye included "Oscar Winning Tears" in the set list of the My 21st Century Blues Tour, which ran from February 2023 to February 2024. In September 2023, "Oscar Winning Tears" was performed as part of a standalone concert at the Royal Albert Hall in London, where Raye was accompanied by the Heritage Orchestra. In a positive review, the NME critic Hannah Mylrea compared her vocals to those from Amy Winehouse and other jazz singers. The performance was included on Raye's live album My 21st Century Symphony (Live at the Royal Albert Hall) (2023). Raye performed "Oscar Winning Tears" at the 2024 MTV Europe Music Awards on 10 November 2024, alongside "Escapism" and "Body Dysmorphia", with a choir and an orchestra. It was met with a positive reception from the public. She also sang it as part of her appearance on The Kelly Clarkson Show.

On 2 February 2025, Raye performed the song at the 67th Annual Grammy Awards, where she was nominated in three categories including Best New Artist; she contributed to a medley of songs from the nominees of that category. Raye wore a black dress and was accompanied with an orchestra and a backing choir. Cerys Davies from Los Angeles Times believed that Raye hit "each of the high notes with ease", while Heran Mamo from Billboard praised her vocals as "jaw-dropping" and wrote that it received a standing ovation. The staff of Clash named it one of the best performances of the ceremony and said that it was "all technical excellence and shattering emotional impact". American Songwriter's Thom Donovan described it as a standout at the ceremony and believed that, although Raye did not win the category, it "felt like one of those moments when someone becomes a legend".

== Personnel ==
The personnel is adapted from the liner notes of My 21st Century Blues.

- Rachel Keen (Raye) – lead vocals, songwriter
- Mike Sabath – songwriter, producer, engineer, string arranger, piano, bass, drums, synthesizers
- Jacob Braun – cello
- Paul Cartwright – violin
- Adam Krevlin – string arranger
- Jonathan Castelli – mixing engineer
- Josh Deguzman – mixing engineer
- Jenna Felsenthal – vocal recording engineer
- Dale Becker – mastering engineer
- Connor Hedge – assistant engineer
- Katie Harvey – assistant engineer
- Noah McCorkle – assistant engineer

== Track listing ==
Digital download / streaming

1. "Oscar Winning Tears" (radio edit) – 2:56
2. "Oscar Winning Tears" (live at Royal Albert Hall) – 3:20
3. "Oscar Winning Tears" (album version) – 3:03

== Charts ==
Chart performance for "Oscar Winning Tears"
Chart (2024–2025)	Peak position
Ireland (IRMA)	58
Romania Airplay (TopHit)	99
UK Singles (Official Charts)	52
UK Indie (Official Charts)	9
US Pop Airplay (Billboard)	35
US Rhythmic Airplay (Billboard)	26

== Certifications ==
Certifications for "Oscar Winning Tears"
Region	Certification	Certified units/sales
Australia (ARIA)	Gold	35,000^{‡}
Brazil (Pro-Música Brasil)	Platinum	40,000^{‡}
Canada (Music Canada)	Gold	40,000^{‡}
New Zealand (RMNZ)	Gold	15,000^{‡}
Norway (IFPI Norway)	Gold	30,000^{‡}
United Kingdom (BPI)	Gold	400,000^{‡}
^{‡} Sales+streaming figures based on certification alone.

== Release history ==
Release dates and formats for "Where Is My Husband!"
Region	Date	Format(s)	Label(s)	Ref.
Various	8 November 2024	Digital download; streaming	Human Re Sources	
United States	10 December 2024	Contemporary hit radio; rhythmic contemporary radio	Human Re Sources; The Orchard	
