= Live at Montreux Jazz Festival =

Live album by Raye
- Released: 13 September 2024
- Recorded: 18 July 2024
- Venue: Montreux Jazz Festival
- Genres: Blues; R&B; jazz
- Length: 48:06
- Label: Human Re Sources

Raye chronology
My 21st Century Symphony (Live at the Royal Albert Hall) (2023)	Live at Montreux Jazz Festival (2024)	This Music May Contain Hope (2026)

Live at Montreux Jazz Festival (commonly stylized as RAYE: Live at Montreux Jazz Festival 2024) is the second live album by British singer-songwriter Raye, released on 13 September 2024. It was recorded at the fifty seventh edition of the Montreux Jazz Festival during her show on 18 July 2024.

== Background ==
On 28 April 2024, it was announced that Keen would be performing at Montreux Jazz Festival.

== Reception ==
The show met with critical acclaim. Writer Will Richards of Rolling Stone UK heralded the performance as "a set that raises the bar... Here, her songs are filtered through an old-timey jazz and soul lens with help from a superbly tight band. Through honest discussions of sexual abuse and addiction to vocal solos that set spines tingling..."

== Track listing ==
Live at Montreux Jazz Festival track listing
No.	Title	Length
1.	"The Thrill Is Gone"	5:11
2.	"Worth It"	5:21
3.	"Mary Jane"	7:56
4.	"Ice Cream Man"	4:49
5.	"Genesis"	7:15
6.	"It's a Man's Man's Man's World"	6:59
7.	"Escapism"	10:31
Total length:		48:06

=== Notes ===
- All tracks are stylised with a full stop at the end.
- Digital editions have all tracks subtitled with "Live at Montreux Jazz Festival".

== Charts ==
Chart performance for Live at Montreux Jazz Festival
Chart (2024)	Peak position
UK Albums Sales (OCC)	64
UK Independent Albums (Official Charts)	22
UK Jazz & Blues Albums (Official Charts)	2
