= The Weekend (Stormzy and Raye song) =

Single by Stormzy and Raye
- Released: 20 July 2023
- Genre: Rhythm and blues; Rap
- Length: 3:26
- Label: EMI
- Songwriters: Michael Omari; Rachel Keen
- Producers: ThisizLondon; Raye

Stormzy singles chronology
| "Longevity Flow" (2023) | "The Weekend" (2023) | "Witness Me" (2023) |

Raye singles chronology
| "Flip a Switch" (2023) | "The Weekend" (2023) | "Prada" (2023) |

Music video
- "The Weekend" on YouTube

"The Weekend" is a song by British rapper Stormzy and singer-songwriter Raye. It was released on 20 July 2023 through Def Jam Recordings. The song marks the second collaboration between the two artists, following "Ambition", a track from Raye's 2016 EP Second. The song was sent to Italian radio as a radio single on 5 September 2023 through EMI Records.

== Composition ==
Written and composed by Stormzy and Raye, who also produced the song with ThisizLondon, the track incorporates elements of 2000s R&B and hip-hop.

== Critical reception ==
El Hunt of Evening Standard described Raye as a "perfect co-conspirator", praising the production for its "smooth, Noughties pop beat" with jazz and gospel influences. Tom Breihan of Stereogum described Raye's vocals as "downright jazzy", while nothing that Stormzy "brings a whole lot of pop-rap swagger to his pickup lines", finding the track "futuristic and familiar". Clash's writer Robin Murray explained that the song "leans on the soulful charms" of both singers, defining it as a "breezy, R&B-influenced track".

== Music video ==
An accompanying music video was directed by Omar Jones and filmed in London. It was released alongside the song on 20 July 2023.

== Charts ==
Weekly chart performance for "The Weekend"
| Chart (2023) | Peak position |
|---|---|
| Ireland (IRMA) | 48 |
| UK Singles (Official Charts) | 22 |
| UK Hip Hop/R&B (Official Charts) | 10 |

== Certifications ==
Certifications for "The Weekend"
| Region | Certification | Certified units/sales |
|---|---|---|
| New Zealand (RMNZ) | Gold | 15,000^{‡} |
| United Kingdom (BPI) | Silver | 200,000^{‡} |
^{‡} Sales+streaming figures based on certification alone.

== Release history ==
"The Weekend" release history
| Region | Date | Format | Label | Ref. |
|---|---|---|---|---|
| Various | 22 July 2023 | Digital download; streaming | Def Jam | |
| Italy | 5 September 2023 | Radio airplay | EMI | |
