= Hard Out Here (Raye song) =

2022 single by Raye

Single by Raye

from the album My 21st Century Blues
- Released: 30 June 2022
- Genre: R&B; pop; dark pop
- Length: 3:11
- Label: Human Re Sources
- Songwriters: Rachel Keen; Justin Tranter; Brandon Colbein; Mike Sabath
- Producer: Mike Sabath

Raye singles chronology
"Waterfall" (2022)	"Hard Out Here" (2022)	"Black Mascara" (2022)

Music video
- "Hard Out Here" on YouTube

"Hard Out Here" is a song by the British singer-songwriter Raye from her debut studio album, My 21st Century Blues (2023). Human Re Sources independently released the song on 30 June 2022 as the album's lead single. Raye wrote it with Justin Tranter, Brandon Colbein, and its producer, Mike Sabath. Musically, "Hard Out Here" is an R&B, pop, and dark pop track with elements of hip-hop. Written in parallel to Raye's departure from Polydor Records, the label she was signed to until 2021, the song sees her confronting misogyny and patriarchy in the music industry.

An accompanying music video for "Hard Out Here" premiered on the same date as the single's release. It depicts the things Raye was allegedly pressured to do by Polydor. Music critics praised Raye's performance on the track as powerful. Commercially, it appeared on the UK Independent Singles Chart. Raye included "Hard Out Here" in the regular set list of the My 21st Century Blues Tour (2023–2024).

== Development and release ==
In 2021, Raye started writing "Hard Out Here" after declaring that Polydor Records, the label she was signed to at the time, prevented her from releasing her debut studio album for seven years. She later agreed to depart the label and continued working on the song. Raye stated that "it was an old track that [she] took the beat from and wrote a completely new song over", as the label did not give her permission to release it. She then became an independent artist and signed to the distribution company Human Re Sources, a subsidiary of The Orchard.

Human Re Sources released "Hard Out Here" on 30 June 2022 as Raye's first solo independent single after her departure from Polydor, and the lead single from her then-upcoming debut album. It was included as the third track on My 21st Century Blues (2023). Commercially, it reached number 32 on the UK Independent Singles Chart issued for 14 July 2022. Raye included the song in the regular set list to the My 21st Century Blues Tour in 2023 and 2024. In March 2024, she performed it in a one-off concert at The O2 Arena in London.

== Composition ==
Raye, Justin Tranter, Brandon Colbein, and Mike Sabath wrote "Hard Out Here", while the latter was in charge of its production. Sabath additionally was the engineer and string arranger, and played drums and synthesizers. Chad Gordon also engineered the track. The other musicians that played instruments are Jacob Braun and Charlie Bisharat on strings. Franky Fox, Jonathan Castelli was the mixing engineer, Dale Becker served as the mastering engineer, and Jenna Felsenthal served as the vocal engineer.

"Hard Out Here" is an R&B, pop, and dark pop track with a length of 3 minutes and 11 seconds. It also contains elements of hip-hop, and interpolates the 1991 song "Give It Away" by the band Red Hot Chili Peppers. The lyrical content of the song is a criticism of misogyny and patriarchy in the music industry. Raye confronts male executives and "white men CEOs", implying that she has been silenced by them, and declares that they should take their "pink chubby hands" off her. She also mentions struggles with drug addiction and suicidal thoughts. In an interview with Consequence, the singer stated that "Hard Out Here" represents her fight to have her own voice and decisions, without the permission of the "men in charge". According to The New York Times' Jon Pareles, Raye "switches between hard-nosed rapping and gospel-charged singing". Cat Woods for The Telegraph compared the track to FKA Twigs' "empowered sexiness".

== Critical reception ==
Critics praised Raye's performance as powerful; Alex Rigotti of Clash compared it to a "fresh war veteran". Alex Gonzalez of Uproxx believed that Raye "proved her a promising act" with the track, while Dork's Abigail Firth wrote that it is "an immediate indication of what she's capable of". When adding it to a list of the best pop songs of its release week, Billboard's Lyndsey Havens said that "each lyric is more eviscerating and empowered than the last". Andy Kellman of AllMusic described the song as "defiant, strutting", while Woods wrote that it depicts "the exhilarating sound of a woman calling out those who have treated her badly". Writing for Beats Per Minute, JT Early highlighted the pre-chorus and believed that releasing "Hard Out Here" as the album's lead single was a risk. Callie Alghrim of Business Insider listed it as one of the five best songs on My 21st Century Blues.

== Music video ==
The accompanying music video for "Hard Out Here" was filmed in one of Henry VIII's hunting lodges; Raye said that he was "renowned for his disrespect and disregard of women in history". The video depicts the early stages of a rising artist. According to Raye, it felt like she was "done being a nice polite pop star". She represented all the things she was allegedly forced to do by Polydor, such as different outfits and musical identities. At the end of the video, she takes off her wig, which Rolling Stone's Tomás Mier considered an act of liberation. Mary Siroky from Consequence described the video as "powerful and evocative".

== Personnel ==
The personnel shown below are adapted from the album's liner notes.

- Raye – lead vocals, songwriter
- Mike Sabath – songwriter, production, drums, synthesizers, string arranger, engineer
- Jenna Felsenthal – vocal engineer
- Jacob Braun – strings
- Charlie Bisharat – strings
- Brandon Colbein – songwriter
- Justin Tranter – songwriter
- Chad Gordon – engineer
- Jonathan Castelli – mixing engineer
- Dale Becker – mastering engineer

== Charts ==
Chart performance for "Hard Out Here"
Chart (2022)	Peak position
UK Indie (OCC)	32
