= Decline (song) =

Single by Raye featuring Mr Eazi

from the EP Side Tape
- Released: 3 November 2017
- Recorded: 2017
- Length: 3:08
- Label: Polydor
- Composers: Jeffrey Atkins; Irving Domingo Lorenzo, Jr.; Marcus Vest; Fraser T Smith
- Lyricists: Rachel Keen; Oluwatosin Oluwole Ajibade; Janée Bennett
- Producer: Fraser T Smith

Raye singles chronology
"The Line" (2017)	"Decline" (2017)	"Check" (2018)

Mr Eazi singles chronology
"Business" (2017)	"Decline" (2017)	"Bad" (2017)

Music video
- "Decline" on YouTube

"Decline" is a song by British singer-songwriter Raye featuring Nigerian singer and songwriter Mr Eazi, released 3 November 2017, as the lead single from the formers third EP, Side Tape. The song samples and interpolates the 2002 single "Always on Time" by Ja Rule featuring Ashanti.

Raye promoted "Decline" through live performances at the events, as Capital's 2018 Summertime Ball, 2018 Wireless Festival, and also Rita Ora's The Girls Tour as the supporting act. Its official music video premiered on 20 November 2017 on singer's official VEVO channel.

"Decline" was a commercial success peaking at number 15 on the UK Singles (Official Charts Company) becoming Raye's highest entry as lead artist at the time and also appeared in the top 100 years end list in the UK. It has since been certified platinum by the United Kingdom (BPI)

== Track listing ==
- Digital download
1. "Decline" – 3:08
- Digital download – Remix
1. "Decline" (Remix) (Raye and Ramz) – 3:16
- Digital download – Acoustic
1. "Decline" (Acoustic) – 3:45

== Charts ==
Weekly chart performance for "Decline"
Chart (2017)	Peak position
Ireland (IRMA)	29
Scottish Singles Sales (Official Charts)	38
UK Singles (Official Charts)	15

=== Year-end charts ===
Year-end chart performance for "Decline"
Chart (2018)	Position
UK Singles (OCC)	98

== Certifications ==
Certifications for "Decline"
Region	Certification	Certified units/sales
United Kingdom (BPI)	Platinum	600,000^{‡}
^{‡} Sales+streaming figures based on certification alone.
