= My 21st Century Blues =

2023 studio album by Raye

Studio album by Raye
- Released: 3 February 2023
- Genres: House; pop; blues; dancehall; R&B; hip-hop; jazz
- Length: 46:48
- Label: Human Re Sources
- Producers: Rachel Keen; Mike Sabath; Punctual; BloodPop; Di Genius; Luca Buccellati; Pete Miller

Raye chronology
Euphoric Sad Songs (Dance Edition) (2020)	My 21st Century Blues (2023)	My 21st Century Symphony (Live at the Royal Albert Hall) (2023)

Singles from My 21st Century Blues
- 1. "Hard Out Here" Released: 30 June 2022; 2. "Black Mascara" Released: 24 August 2022; 3. "Escapism" / "The Thrill Is Gone" Released: 12 October 2022; 4. "Ice Cream Man" Released: 2 February 2023; 5. "Flip a Switch" Released: 7 April 2023; 6. "Worth It" Released: 10 November 2023; 7. "Oscar Winning Tears" Released: 8 November 2024

My 21st Century Blues is the debut studio album by the British singer-songwriter Raye. It was released independently by Human Re Sources on 3 February 2023. It marked her first project following her departure from the record label, Polydor Records, in 2021, which allegedly denied her the release of an album for several years. Largely written and co-produced by herself, she worked with various collaborators, including Mike Sabath, BloodPop, Punctual, and Di Genius. 070 Shake and Mahalia appear as featured artists. Encompassing multiple genres, My 21st Century Blues explores Raye's struggles with drug addictions, body dysmorphia, and sexual assault, alongside other themes.

My 21st Century Blues spawned seven singles. "Escapism", the album's third single, went viral and became Raye's first song to top the national charts of Ireland, Denmark, and the United Kingdom. It received various accolades and certifications. Other charting singles include "Flip a Switch" and "Worth It", which peaked within the top 40 on the UK singles chart. The album was further supported by a headlining concert tour during 2023 and 2024, and was followed by a live album recorded at the Royal Albert Hall.

Upon its release, My 21st Century Blues received acclaim from music critics, many of whom described it as a victory for Raye and praised her performance. Several publications named it one of the best albums of 2023. Commercially, the album debuted at number two on the UK Albums Chart and reached the national rankings of 15 other territories, including top 20 positions in Ireland, Norway, Scotland, and Switzerland. Additionally, it was certified gold in four countries. The album received various accolades, including Album of the Year nominations at the Mercury Prize and MOBO Awards. In 2024, it won British Album of the Year at the Brit Awards, where Raye broke the record for the most wins in a single ceremony.

== Background ==
The British singer-songwriter Raye, born Rachel Keen, demonstrated an interest in music from a young age, entering the BRIT School at 10. She focused on writing music after school with assistance from teachers. In 2014, at age 16, Raye self-released the EP Welcome to the Winter on SoundCloud. She signed to the record label Polydor Records in the same year after she was recommended by the singer Olly Alexander, and had an R&B album already written and ready to be released. She subsequently started working on her music, and co-wrote songs for several artists, including Beyoncé and Charli XCX. Raye spawned two top 20 singles in the United Kingdom, and the platinum-certified collaborations "You Don't Know Me" (2016), "Secrets" (2020), and "Bed" (2021).

According to Raye, Polydor pressured her to release "chart-friendly dance tracks" that she did not like. Releasing music of several genres, she struggled with her own identity, saying that she "didn't know who [she] was" musically, later believing that it was not consistent. Raye released various projects, including an extended play (EP) titled Euphoric Sad Songs (2020). In June 2021, the singer was informed that she could not release a debut album with Polydor if her single "Call on Me" (2021) underperformed on record charts. She later expressed her frustration through tweets and received support from fellow musicians, before parting ways with the label and becoming an independent artist. In 2022, she signed with the distribution company Human Re Sources, and began to own her master recordings.

== Writing and recording ==
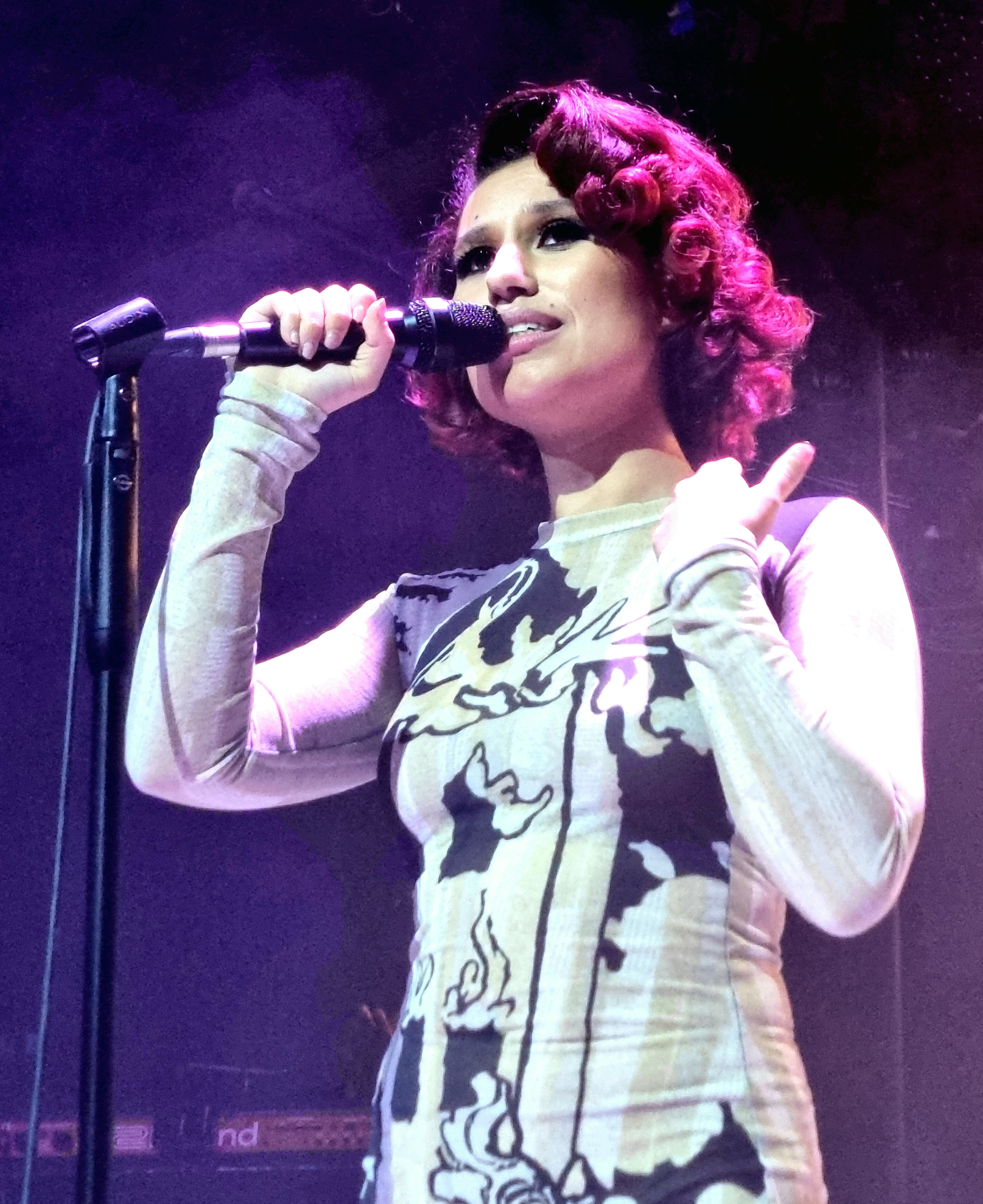
Raye (pictured) co-wrote all the lyrics on My 21st Century Blues.

After her departure from Polydor, Raye began focusing on My 21st Century Blues, and co-wrote the song "Hard Out Here". The idea for the album began with its title, as she decided to "tell [her] blues", and felt relevant being "honest about those things [she] kept in the darkness for so many years". Most of the music she wrote for the album was negatively received by representatives from other labels, and Raye had no "choice but to go independent". Some songs present on the final track listing—including "Oscar Winning Tears", "Worth It", and "Ice Cream Man"—were written several years before the release of My 21st Century Blues, while being included as they "fit the theme" of the album. She wrote these songs between the ages 18 and 20. Raye stated that the album is her "little mosaic of stories [she] collected". It was recorded at several places, including Valentine Recording Studio in Los Angeles ("The Thrill is Gone"), and at a residential studio in Utah ("Escapism"). The first beat for the latter was created by her collaborator Mike Sabath; Raye thought that it fit the theme of the song and decided to call the American rapper 070 Shake to collaborate on the track.

Raye co-produced eight songs on My 21st Century Blues, predominantly with Sabath. The producers Punctual, Di Genius, BloodPop, Luca Buccellati, and Pete Miller also received credits. Its lyrics were in charge of Raye along with various collaborators: Justin Tranter, Akil King, Jenna Felsenthal, Eyelar Mirzazadeh, and the featured artists 070 Shake and Mahalia. While recording the album, Raye listened to artists that influenced her early work, including Nina Simone, Etta James, and B. B. King. She was also inspired by a poster of Simone with the quote, "An artist's duty is to reflect the times." With My 21st Century Blues, Raye said that she tried not to focus on commercial success, and felt liberated after working on it, which was a "medicine" to her. About the stylization idea, the songs have a full stop on the titles "because they do feel like complete stories" to Raye. She also expressed her desire for listeners to listen to the album in order.

== Composition ==
=== Overview ===
Inspired by 1970s music, My 21st Century Blues mixes house music, pop, blues, dancehall, R&B, hip-hop, and jazz. The album contains influences from other genres, including doo-wop, soul, and electro. It includes a darker production in comparison to Raye's previous releases. According to Tomás Mier of Rolling Stone, Raye's vocals contain elements of those from Amy Winehouse. They were also inspired by jazz, which is Raye's most consumed genre. Lyrically, My 21st Century Blues explores several themes, including disordered eating, addictions, heartbreak, discrimination, and self-image. Raye wanted to be "explicit and evocative"; she said that the album's essence is "speaking candidly". She was inspired by the lyricism of the albums Who Is Jill Scott?: Words and Sounds Vol. 1 (2000) and The Diary of Alicia Keys (2003).

=== Songs ===
The album consists of 15 tracks. It starts with a spoken introduction presenting Raye to a jazz club. The jazz-influenced song "Oscar Winning Tears" contains lyrics about "leaving an emotionally abusive and manipulative man". On the R&B and dark pop track "Hard Out Here", Raye confronts patriarchy in the music industry and "white men CEOs" while singing, "This LP's full of the shit I'm gonna say to you". It interpolates the 1991 song "Give It Away" by the band Red Hot Chili Peppers. On the fourth track, "Black Mascara", Raye sings about being spiked by a close person. It is a dance and electronic song with a club beat and synthesisers. Its refrain goes from "What you done to me?" to "You're done to me". The lyrics of "Escapism" detail a night out after the end of a relationship, where she decides to turn to drugs. The trip hop beat of "Escapism" is made by synthesisers, sirens, and strings. According to Pitchfork's Aimee Cliff, it recalls the R&B style from Raye's early EPs. On the "bluesy" track "Mary Jane", Raye opens up about her drug addictions, mentioning marijuana and codeine. Musically, it is stripped-back and contains slow motioned drums and guitar riffs. Over blues guitars and funk shuffles, "The Thrill Is Gone"'s lyrical content describes an abusive relationship, where the singer also shares the end of the love she had for another person. Dork's Abigail Firth and NME's Hannah Mylrea said that it is reminiscent to the early work of Winehouse. The album centrepiece, "Ice Cream Man", is a sentimental ballad where Raye exposes repeated situations of sexual assault she had experienced since the age of seven. She then details a situation when a producer took advantage of her in a studio session. It is directed to her abusers, with the purpose for them to not "lay hands on a woman like that ever again in [their] life".

The second half of My 21st Century Blues is more pop-focused. Raye explores R&B on the ninth song, "Flip a Switch", which has a dancehall rhythm with guitar and electronics. It also contains elements of Afrobeats. She named "Body Dysmorphia" the most revealing song from the album; she reveals her struggles with disordered eating and her insecurities with her own image. Raye also criticises how society pressures women to look "skinny with an hourglass figure". Over a trip-hop beat, she sings: "I'm so hungry I can't sleep / But I know if I eat / Then I'll be in the bathroom on my knees". Inspired by the broadcaster David Attenborough, the lyrical content of "Environmental Anxiety" focuses on climate change, political issues, and the overuse of social media. Raye mentions the status of the then-Prime Minister of the UK Boris Johnson. The "semi-rapped" "Five Star Hotels" featuring Mahalia is an R&B track that features soothing guitars and a trap beat. The funk-inspired song "Worth It" compared by Mylrea to the works of the American musical superduo Silk Sonic. It is a romantic song, on which she sings: "You could be, be my glass of wine / In the sunset, help me exhale all the excess". The soul ballad "Buss It Down" contains a gospel choir. Crystal Bell from Paper described it as "a joyful celebration of womanhood and sexuality", while JT Early of Beats Per Minute said that it sees Raye "partying it up and loving herself". A spoken outro titled "Fin" closes My 21st Century Blues where the singer proclaims, "I've waited seven years for this moment".

== Release and promotion ==
"Hard Out Here", Raye's first song as an independent artist, was released on 30 June 2022 as the album's first single alongside a music video. It was followed by "Black Mascara" on 24 August, also with an accompanying video. She performed the track on BBC Radio 1's Live Lounge, alongside a cover of Kate Bush's "Running Up That Hill" (1985). On 12 October 2022, Raye released a dual single, "Escapism" and "The Thrill Is Gone". Two days later, the singer announced My 21st Century Blues, which was made available for pre-order; she also revealed its release date and cover artwork. The music video for "Escapism" was released on 9 November, and the first dates for her then-upcoming headlining tour were revealed. "Escapism" went viral on the video-sharing app TikTok and became Raye's first number one song on the UK singles chart, three months after its release. The song also topped the national charts of Ireland and Denmark. It also made her appear on the Billboard Global 200 and the US Billboard Hot 100 for the first time. "Escapism" later received several certifications.

On 5 January 2023, Raye revealed the track listing for My 21st Century Blues on her social media accounts. The album was released on 3 February 2023 independently via Human Re Sources, two days after the fourth single "Ice Cream Man". It was issued through CD, vinyl LP, cassette, and digital formats. A self-directed visual for "Ice Cream Man" premiered on 1 March; it was described by Raye as "the toughest thing [she has] ever filmed" to that point. On 7 April, a sped-up version of the track "Flip a Switch" was released. A music video for a remix of the song, which featured the American rapper Coi Leray, premiered on 5 June. "Worth It" and "Oscar Winning Tears" were issued as the last two singles from the album onto digital platforms on 10 November 2023 and 8 November 2024, respectively. The last three singles peaked at numbers 35, 33, and 52 in the UK, respectively.

The album was supported by My 21st Century Blues Tour, a concert tour that passed through Europe, North America, and Australia between February 2023 and February 2024. On 16 October 2023, Raye released a live album titled My 21st Century Symphony (Live at the Royal Albert Hall), recorded at Royal Albert Hall in London with assistance from the Heritage Orchestra and the Flames Collective choir. She described it as "the most magnificent thing" she had done to that point. The tour received a positive review from Kitty Empire of The Guardian in 2024. Raye also served as an opening act for the singers Lewis Capaldi, Kali Uchis, and SZA. On American television, Raye sang tracks from My 21st Century Blues at programs such as Jimmy Kimmel Live! and The Late Show with Stephen Colbert. She also performed at the Reading Festival in 2024.

== Commercial performance ==
Upon its release, My 21st Century Blues appeared on the main national charts of 16 territories. In the United Kingdom, it debuted and peaked at number two on the UK Albums Chart with 15,516 units sold. In 2024, following Raye's appearance at the Brit Awards 2024, My 21st Century Blues re-entered the chart at number five, and received a gold certification by the British Phonographic Industry (BPI). It was one of the best selling albums of that year in the country. Internationally, the album reached the top 20 on the Scottish Albums Chart at number 4, in Ireland at 13, Norway at 16, and Switzerland at 17. It peaked at number 25 in Canada, and was later certified gold by Music Canada. My 21st Century Blues also peaked within the top 40 in the Netherlands (30), Germany, New Zealand (both 34), and the Flanders region of Belgium (38). It reached middle-low positions on the US Billboard 200 (58), in Lithuania (80), Spain (95), Australia, France (both 97), and Belgium's Wallonia (139). Additionally, the album was certified platinum by IFPI Danmark and Recorded Music NZ.

== Accolades ==
My 21st Century Blues received various accolades. In 2023, it won the Pop Music Award at the South Bank Sky Arts Awards, was nominated for Best Independent Album at the AIM Independent Music Awards, and was shortlisted for Album of the Year at the Mercury Prize. In 2024, it received nominations for Album of the Year at the MOBO Awards 2023, Best Album at the Ivor Novello Awards, and Favorite Debut Album at the 2024 iHeartRadio Music Awards. My 21st Century Blues won British Album of the Year at the Brit Awards 2024, where Raye surpassed Blur, Adele, and Harry Styles as the artist with the most wins in a single ceremony, also receiving British Artist of the Year, Best New Artist, British R&B Act, Songwriter of the Year, and Song of the Year (for "Escapism").

The album's fourth single, "Ice Cream Man", won the Recording Academy's 2026 Harry Belafonte Best Song for Social Change Award. In 2024, the song had been ranked by Billboard as the 35th best song about the music industry.

== Critical reception ==
Professional ratings
Aggregate scores
Source	Rating
AnyDecentMusic?	7.6/10
Metacritic	82/100
Review scores
Source	Rating
AllMusic	4/5 stars
Clash	6/10
DIY	4.5/5 stars
Dork	4/5 stars
The Guardian	4/5 stars
The Independent	5/5 stars
The Line of Best Fit	7/10
NME	4/5 stars
Pitchfork	6.6/10
The Telegraph	5/5 stars

Upon its release, My 21st Century Blues was met with acclaim from music critics. On the review aggregator site Metacritic, which assigns a normalized score out of 100 to ratings from publications, the album received a weighted mean score of 82 based on 12 reviews, indicating "universal acclaim". AnyDecentMusic? gave it 7.6 out of 10, based on their assessment of the critical consensus with ten reviews.

Reviewers praised Raye's energy on the album. Early opined that it was a risk in Raye's career and lauded her vulnerability and bravery for sharing her experience in the music industry. Ben Tipple of DIY praised her confidence and empowerment, while Hellen Brown of The Independent believed that the narrative was brave and strong. Mylrea described the lyrics as "honest" and Raye's vocal performance as "gorgeous", and The Telegraph's Cat Woods lauded her soprano voice. Some reviewers believed that Raye stands out among other contemporary pop artists, with AllMusic's Andy Kellman writing that it would have not sounded convincing in the voice of another musician.

The production of My 21st Century Blues received commentary. Pitchfork's Aimee Cliff believed that Raye is "far more thrilling when she steps outside" her "comfort zone", which is the old-school tracks containing soft melodies. Clash's Alex Rigotti admired the first part, but thought that the second half lacks from cohesion. Early and Dork's Neive McCarthy thought that it was a hard listen. The tracks "Ice Cream Man" and "Escapism" were chosen as standouts.

Several critics viewed the album as a victory for Raye. Woods stated that it "deserves to be listened to from start to finish". Writing for The Line of Best Fit, Hayley Milross said that the album would be considered "an iconic debut" in the future, and praised Raye for "the path she paved for other artists to not be tied down to contracts that do not serve them". McCarthy finalized the review by saying that Raye is "laying waste to all that have stood in her way until now".

=== Year-end lists ===
My 21st Century Blues appeared on several publications' year-end listicles of the best music released in 2023, including a number one position from The Telegraph. It was ranked within the top 10 by Business Insider, Esquire, The Independent, and Variety. Uproxx also added the album to an unranked list. Additionally, "Escapism", the remix of "Flip a Switch", and the live version of "Environmental Anxiety" were named some of the best songs of 2023.

Select year-end rankings for My 21st Century Blues
Publication	List	Rank	Ref.
Billboard	The 50 Best Albums of 2023: Staff List	34	
Business Insider	The best albums of 2023	4	
Consequence	The 50 Best Albums of 2023	22	
DIY	DIY's Albums of the Year 2023	19	
Dork	Dork's Top 50 Albums of 2023: 40–31	35	
Esquire	The Best Albums of 2023	6	
The Forty-Five	The 45 best albums of 2023	41	
The Independent	The 30 best albums of 2023, from Olivia Rodrigo to Lana Del Rey	10	
The Telegraph	The 10 best albums of 2023, ranked	1	
Variety	The Best Albums of 2023	8	

== Track listing ==
My 21st Century Blues track listing
No.	Title	Lyrics	Music	Producer(s)	Length
1.	"Introduction"	Rachel Keen	Austin Lichtenstein; Pete Miller	Mike Sabath	0:57
2.	"Oscar Winning Tears"	Keen	Keen; Sabath	Sabath	3:03
3.	"Hard Out Here"	Keen; Justin Tranter	Brandon Colbein; Sabath	Sabath	3:11
4.	"Black Mascara"	Keen	Keen; William Lansley; John Morgan	Punctual	3:59
5.	"Escapism" (featuring 070 Shake)	Keen; Danielle Balbuena	Keen; Sabath	Sabath	4:32
6.	"Mary Jane"	Keen	Keen; Sabath	Raye; Sabath	3:52
7.	"The Thrill Is Gone"	Keen; Isabella Sjostrand	Keen; Anton Goransson; Sabath	Raye; Sabath	3:19
8.	"Ice Cream Man"	Keen	Keen; Sabath; Michael Tucker	Raye; Sabath; BloodPop	4:08
9.	"Flip a Switch"	Keen	Keen; Stephen McGregor	Raye; Di Genius; Sabath	3:21
10.	"Body Dysmorphia"	Keen	Keen; Sabath	Sabath	2:33
11.	"Environmental Anxiety"	Keen; Jenna Felsenthal	Keen; Sabath	Raye; Sabath	3:14
12.	"Five Star Hotels" (featuring Mahalia)	Keen; Kennedi Lykken; Mahalia Burkmar	Keen; Eddie Benjamin; Sabath	Sabath; Luca Buccellati; Miller	3:24
13.	"Worth It"	Keen; Akil King	Keen; Sabath; John Hill	Raye; Sabath	4:06
14.	"Buss It Down"	Keen; Eyelar Mirzazadeh	Keen; Antionette Smith; Sabath	Raye; Sabath; Miller	2:36
15.	"Fin"	Keen	Keen	Raye; Sabath; Miller	0:33
Total length:					46:48

Notes

- All tracks are stylized with a full stop at the end.

== Personnel ==
The personnel is adapted from the album's liner notes.

- Raye – vocals, songwriting (1–15); production (6–9, 11, 13–15); background vocals (7, 12–14); string and horn arranging (13)
- Mike Sabath – production (1–3, 5–15); songwriting (2, 3, 5–8, 10–14); engineering (5, 6, 8–11, 14, 15); piano (2, 6, 8); bass (2, 6, 8, 11, 12, 14); drums (2, 3, 5, 6, 8, 11, 12); synthesizer (2, 3, 5, 8, 10, 11); string arranging (2, 3, 5–7, 13); Mellotron (5, 9); guitar (6–12); background vocals (7, 13, 14); horn arranging (7, 13); strings (12)
- Jenna Felsenthal – vocal engineering (2–15); songwriting (11)
- Pete Miller – songwriting, piano (1); production (12, 14, 15); piano, B3 (14, 15)
- Adam Krevlin – string engineer (2, 5–7, 13)
- The MoonGirls – drums, bass, Wurlitzer electronic piano, (7, 13); B3 (7); guitar (13)
- 070 Shake – vocals, songwriting (5)
- Mahalia – vocals, songwriting (12)
- Franky Fox – engineering (1, 13)
- Jacob Braun – cello (2, 3, 5–7)
- Paul Cartwright – violin (2, 5–7)
- Austin Lichtenstein – songwriting, voice (1)
- Tia Ferguson – background vocals (1, 7)
- Justin Tranter – songwriting (3)
- Brandon Colbein – songwriting (3)
- Charlie Bisharat – strings (3)
- Chad Gordon - engineering (3, 5)
- Punctual – songwriting, production (4)
- Anton Göransson – songwriting (7)
- Isabella Sjostrand – songwriting (7)
- Michael Harris – engineering (7, 13)
- Tristan Hurd – trumpet (7, 13)
- Alex Young – tenor saxophone (7, 13)
- Alex Csillag – trombone (7)
- Tim Mckay – baritone sax (7)
- BloodPop – songwriting (8)
- Di Genius – songwriting, production (9)
- Eddie Benjamin – songwriting, guitar, bass (12)
- Kennedi Lykken – songwriting (12)
- Alex Robinson – vocal engineering (12)
- Luca Buccellati – production, drums (12)
- John Hill – songwriting, synthesizer (13)
- Akil "Fresh" King – songwriting (13)
- Sean Deschamps – cello (13)
- DSharp – violin (13)
- Eyelar Mirazazadek – songwriting (14)
- Antoinette Smith – songwriting (14)
- Jon Castelli – mixing (all tracks)
- Dale Becker – mastering (all tracks)

== Charts ==
=== Weekly charts ===
Weekly chart performance for My 21st Century Blues
Chart (2023–2026)	Peak position
Australian Albums (ARIA)	97
Belgian Albums (Ultratop Flanders)	14
Belgian Albums (Ultratop Wallonia)	139
Canadian Albums (Billboard)	25
Danish Albums (Hitlisten)	34
Dutch Albums (Album Top 100)	21
French Albums (SNEP)	97
German Albums (Offizielle Top 100)	34
Irish Albums (Official Charts)	13
Lithuanian Albums (AGATA)	80
New Zealand Albums (RMNZ)	34
Norwegian Albums (VG-lista)	16
Scottish Albums (Official Charts)	4
Spanish Albums (Promusicae)	95
Swiss Albums (Schweizer Hitparade)	17
UK Albums (Official Charts)	2
UK Independent Albums (Official Charts)	1
US Billboard 200	58
US Independent Albums (Billboard)	8

=== Year-end charts ===
Year-end chart performance for My 21st Century Blues
Chart	Year	Position
UK Albums (OCC)	2024	76
Belgian Albums (Ultratop Flanders)	2025	121

== Certifications ==
Certifications for My 21st Century Blues
Region	Certification	Certified units/sales
Canada (Music Canada)	Platinum	80,000^{‡}
Denmark (IFPI Danmark)	Platinum	20,000^{‡}
France (SNEP)	Gold	50,000^{‡}
New Zealand (RMNZ)	Platinum	15,000^{‡}
Poland (ZPAV)	Gold	10,000^{‡}
United Kingdom (BPI)	Gold	100,000^{‡}
^{‡} Sales+streaming figures based on certification alone.
