= Flip a Switch =

2023 single by Raye

- Coi Leray remix cover

Single by Raye

from the album My 21st Century Blues
- Released: 7 April 2023
- Length: 3:05; 3:21 (Coi Leray remix)
- Label: Human Re Sources
- Songwriters: Rachel Keen; Stephen McGregor
- Producers: Keen; Di Genius; Mike Sabath

Raye singles chronology
"Ice Cream Man" (2023)	"Flip a Switch" (2023)	"The Weekend" (2023)

Coi Leray singles chronology
"Baby Don't Hurt Me" (2023)	"Flip a Switch" (remix) (2023)	"Bops" (2023)

Music video
- "Flip a Switch" (remix) on YouTube

"Flip a Switch" is a song by British singer-songwriter Raye from her debut studio album My 21st Century Blues (2023). She co-produced the track along with Stephen McGregor and Mike Sabath. It became available on 3 February 2023, the date its parent album was released, through Human Re Sources. On 7 April 2023, it was released as the album's fifth single along with a sped up version, while a remix featuring American rapper Coi Leray followed two weeks later. Upon its release as a single, "Flip a Switch" reached the top 40 in Ireland and the United Kingdom, and was certified gold by the British Phonographic Industry (BPI).

== Background ==
Raye announced the track listing of her debut studio album, My 21st Century Blues, via her Twitter official account on 5 January 2023, which contained "Flip a Switch" as the ninth song. Coi Leray recorded her verses for a remix in February, before the album came out. About collaborating with the rapper, Raye stated:

"Collaborating is always a really inspiring process for me — I really love to hear another artist's perspective on something I've created and Coi is so fearless. I really admire how confident she is especially when it comes to how she'll promote herself on social media — like if she loves a song, she’s just like 'I'm gonna post about it like three times this week and not give a fuck.' She had the perfect energy for the song."

== Composition ==
A song she wrote at 17 or 18, the original version of "Flip a Switch" is three minutes and five seconds long. A vindictive song with a trap beat and more experimental instrumentation, it "changes the album to a different tone". The song was also described as "flamenco-flecked", and the singer said: "I play it when I need to feel like I'm a bad bitch. It's just another form of medicine, isn't it?". The remix features Leray in new verses, reinforcing the "anti-fuckboy energy" of the material.

== Music video ==
A music video for the Coi Leray remix was released on 5 June 2023.

== Charts ==
Chart performance for "Flip a Switch"
Chart (2023)	Peak position
Ireland (IRMA)	36
UK Singles (Official Charts)	35

== Certifications ==
Certifications for "Flip a Switch"
Region	Certification	Certified units/sales
United Kingdom (BPI)	Gold	400,000^{‡}
^{‡} Sales+streaming figures based on certification alone.
