= The Line (Raye song) =

Single by Raye
- Released: 19 May 2017
- Recorded: 2017
- Genre: Club
- Length: 3:19
- Label: Polydor
- Composer(s): Alex Gibson; Fred Gibson; Ed Phillips
- Lyricist(s): Jamie Bell; Rachel Keen
- Producer(s): Fred

Raye singles chronology
"You Don't Know Me" (2016)	"The Line" (2017)	"Decline" (2017)

Music video
- "The Line" on YouTube

"The Line" is a song by British singer-songwriter Raye. It was released on 19 May 2017 via Polydor Records.

== Background ==
In an interview by PopBuzz, when asked about the inspiration behind 'The Line', Raye said "I remember being in the line for a club a few years back and I had my favourite trainers on and a t-shirt and it took me ages to get ready. I was queued up for ages and then the bouncer at the door was like "no, you're not coming in". So I was so upset...and then I kinda looked around and I saw the females in the club world, the way girls are expected to dress and behave, it's just so outdated and so boring. Like you have to wear heels and dresses and look really formal and blah, blah, blah. So I was really upset about it so I wrote the song, that's kinda the inspiration behind it."

"Going out clubbing gives you a cold dose of the expectation society has on women," said Raye, in an interview by The Fader magazine. "To get into a club you have to kill yourself in heels, drown in makeup with a tight dress, maybe a bit of cleavage will help you out too. Me going as 'myself,' wearing what I wanted, didn’t cut it. You have to fit within the boundaries and expectations put on you. Watching all these casually dressed men waltzing past me in the queue really pissed me off, so I wrote this tune."

In another interview by Clash magazine, Raye wrote in a text message "'The Line: is/was literally the story of my life."

== Track listing ==
Digital download
No.	Title	Length
1.	"The Line"	3:19

Digital download – Offaiah Remix
No.	Title	Length
1.	"The Line" (Offaiah Remix)	4:46

== Credits and personnel ==
Credits adapted from Tidal.

- Raye – composer, lyricist, vocalist
- Alex Gibson – composer, lyricist
- Jamie Bell – composer, lyricist
- Fred Gibson – composer, lyricist, producer
- Ed Phillips – composer, lyricist
- Mark 'Spike' Stent – mixer

== Charts ==
Chart performance for "The Line"
Chart (2017)	Peak position
Scotland (OCC)	50
UK Singles (OCC)	65

== Release history ==
Release dates and formats for "The Line"
Region	Date	Format	Version	Label	Ref.
United States	19 May 2017	Digital download	Original	Polydor	
United States	9 June 2017	Digital download	Offaiah Remix	Polydor	
United Kingdom	21 July 2017	Contemporary hit radio	Original	Polydor	
