= Raye =

British singer-songwriter (born 1997)

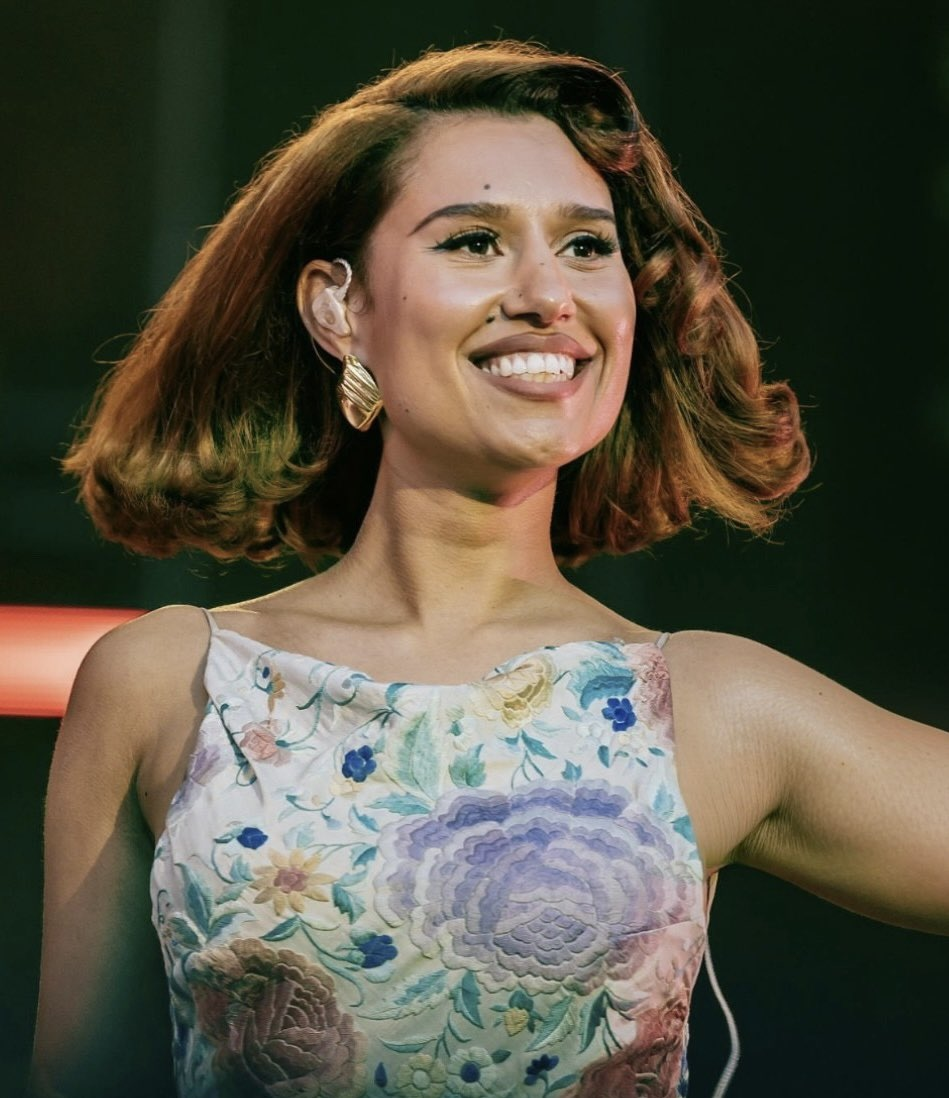
- Raye in 2025
- Born: Rachel Agatha Keen; 24 October 1997 (age 29); Tooting, London, England
- Occupations: Singer-songwriter; record producer
- Years active: 2014–present
- Works: Discography
- Relatives: Absolutely (sister); Amma (sister)
- Awards: Full list
- Musical career
- Genres: R&B; pop; jazz; dance; soul
- Instruments: Vocals; piano
- Labels: Polydor; Human Re Sources
- Website: rayeofficial.com

Rachel Agatha Keen (born 24 October 1997), known professionally as Raye (Note: often stylised in all caps) (/reɪ/ RAY), is a British singer-songwriter and record producer. Her music blends elements of jazz, pop, dance, R&B, and soul, and her lyrics address personal experiences and contemporary issues. She has contributed as a songwriter to music by numerous other artists.

She signed with Polydor Records in 2014 and gained recognition in 2016 through collaborations on Jonas Blue's "By Your Side"—her first entry on the UK Singles Chart—and Jax Jones's "You Don't Know Me", which reached the UK top three. Raye later released several extended plays, as well as the project Euphoric Sad Songs (2020), which spawned the UK top-ten single "Secrets", a collaboration with Regard. In 2021, she collaborated with Joel Corry and David Guetta on the UK top-three entry "Bed", and departed Polydor, citing the label's refusal to release her debut studio album.

Raye signed with Human Re Sources in 2022 and independently released her debut studio album, My 21st Century Blues (2023), to critical acclaim. Its third single, "Escapism", became her first UK chart-topper. Raye's second studio album, This Music May Contain Hope (2026), also received critical acclaim and became her first number-one album on the UK Albums Chart. Its lead single, "Where Is My Husband!", became her second UK chart-topper and her highest-charting release on the Billboard Global 200.

The first female recipient of the Brit Award for Songwriter of the Year, Raye has won seven Brit Awards, two Ivor Novello Awards, and a Mercury Prize, in addition to awards from the Recording Academy and the Songwriters Hall of Fame and nominations for fourteen Grammy Awards. Her six wins at the Brit Awards 2024 set the record for the most awards received by an artist in a single year.

== Early life ==
Rachel Agatha Keen was born on 24 October 1997 in Tooting, London, to a mother of Swiss-German and Ghanaian parentage who is a mental health worker, and an English father from Yorkshire. She has three younger sisters: the singer-songwriters Absolutely and Amma, and Katelyn. As a child, Raye frequently attended the church where her mother sang in the choir and her father was the musical director. Raye and her family later moved to Croydon, where she grew up and studied at Woodcote High School.

Surrounded by music, Raye first showed interest in becoming a recording artist at the age of eight. She wrote her first song for a concert in Year 6 and performed it at Southwark Cathedral, after her father taught her how to play the piano. At the age of 14, Raye was chosen to enter the BRIT School, where she studied for two years before dropping out due to feeling "confined". She spent most of her teenage years learning how to write songs professionally in studio sessions on the weekends. She has been diagnosed with attention deficit hyperactivity disorder (ADHD) and post-traumatic stress disorder, the latter of which she attributes to being sexually assaulted by a music producer at the age of 17.

== Career ==
=== 2014–2018: Early career and breakthrough ===
In November 2014, at the age of 17, Raye independently uploaded her debut extended play (EP), Welcome to the Winter, to the audio streaming service SoundCloud. She wrote, recorded, and co-produced the seven tracks on the track listing. Olly Alexander, then the lead singer of the band Years & Years, discovered the EP's single "Hotbox" through the music website Hype Machine and sent it to the record label he was signed to, Polydor Records. Raye signed a contract with them thereafter. In 2015, she released the single "Alien" featuring Avelino and covered the Years & Years song "Shine", later opening for the band's show at Shepherd's Bush Empire.

Raye's following EP, Second, was released in August 2016 through Polydor Records. She co-wrote its single "I, U, Us" with the singers Noonie Bao and Charli XCX; the latter also directed the song's music video. The same year, Raye featured on Jonas Blue's "By Your Side" and Jax Jones's "You Don't Know Me", which respectively reached numbers fifteen and three on the UK singles chart. "By Your Side" became her first song to enter the chart. Months later, Raye served as an opening act for a concert tour by the singer Jess Glynne.

Raye performed at the club XOYO in London in February 2017, receiving positive reviews from publications. She worked on Charli XCX's "After the Afterparty", and appeared on the "VIP" remix to the song with the singer Rita Ora and the rapper Stefflon Don. Raye starred in the music video for the Stormzy song "Big For Your Boots" in the same month, and featured on the track "Dreamer" from Charli XCX's collaborative project Number 1 Angel (2017). The singles "The Line" and "Decline" were also released in 2017; the latter featured the singer Mr Eazi. Raye's third EP, Side Tape, premiered in 2018, following the release of the single "Cigarette", which features Don and the singer Mabel. In parallel, Raye received writing credits on songs by the girl group Little Mix and the singer John Legend. In June, Raye performed at the Summertime Ball in London, held by the radio network Capital. Later in 2018, she released a stand-alone single dedicated to her friends and supported Ora and the singer-songwriter Halsey on their respective concert tours. Raye embarked on her first headlining tour in 2018.

=== 2019–2021: Euphoric Sad Songs and departure from Polydor ===
In 2019, Raye featured on Odunsi the Engine's song "Tipsy" and David Guetta's song "Stay (Don't Go Away)", released in March and May, respectively. The latter became Raye's first number-one song on Billboard's US Dance/Mix Show Airplay chart. She supported the singer Khalid on his Free Spirit World Tour. Raye co-wrote the track "Bigger" by the singer Beyoncé, which featured on the soundtrack album The Lion King: The Gift, released in July 2019. BBC News believed that it was "arguably her biggest song-writing credit" at the time. Between August and November 2019, Raye released the solo single "Love Me Again" and the collaboration "Make It to Heaven" with Guetta and the producer Morten.

In early 2020, Raye released "Tequila" in collaboration with Jax Jones and the DJ Martin Solveig, and "Secrets" with the DJ Regard. "Secrets" peaked at number six in the United Kingdom and was certified platinum by the British Phonographic Industry (BPI). In July 2020, Raye released "Natalie Don't", which preceded her project Euphoric Sad Songs, released in November. It included previously released songs alongside the singles "Love of Your Life" and "Regardless", the latter in collaboration with Rudimental. The project centred on the stages of grief. The critic Rachel Aroesti from The Guardian gave it a mixed review; she opined it lives up to its title but lacks personality.

In February 2021, Raye collaborated with Guetta and the DJ Joel Corry on the single "Bed", which reached number three on the UK singles chart, marking her highest-charting single as a lead artist on the chart at the time, and topped the US Dance/Mix Show Airplay chart. She also co-wrote and co-produced the song "Let Them Know" by Mabel. In June, Raye released "Call On Me", a song written for her sister and intended to serve as the lead single for her debut studio album. Later that month, she revealed that Polydor had been withholding her debut album for several years. The statement was met with support from fellow artists. Following this, Raye went on a hiatus, and later announced that she had parted ways with the label to work as an independent artist. Raye closed the year performing her headline Euphoric Sad Show UK and Ireland tour.

=== 2022–2024: My 21st Century Blues and international recognition ===
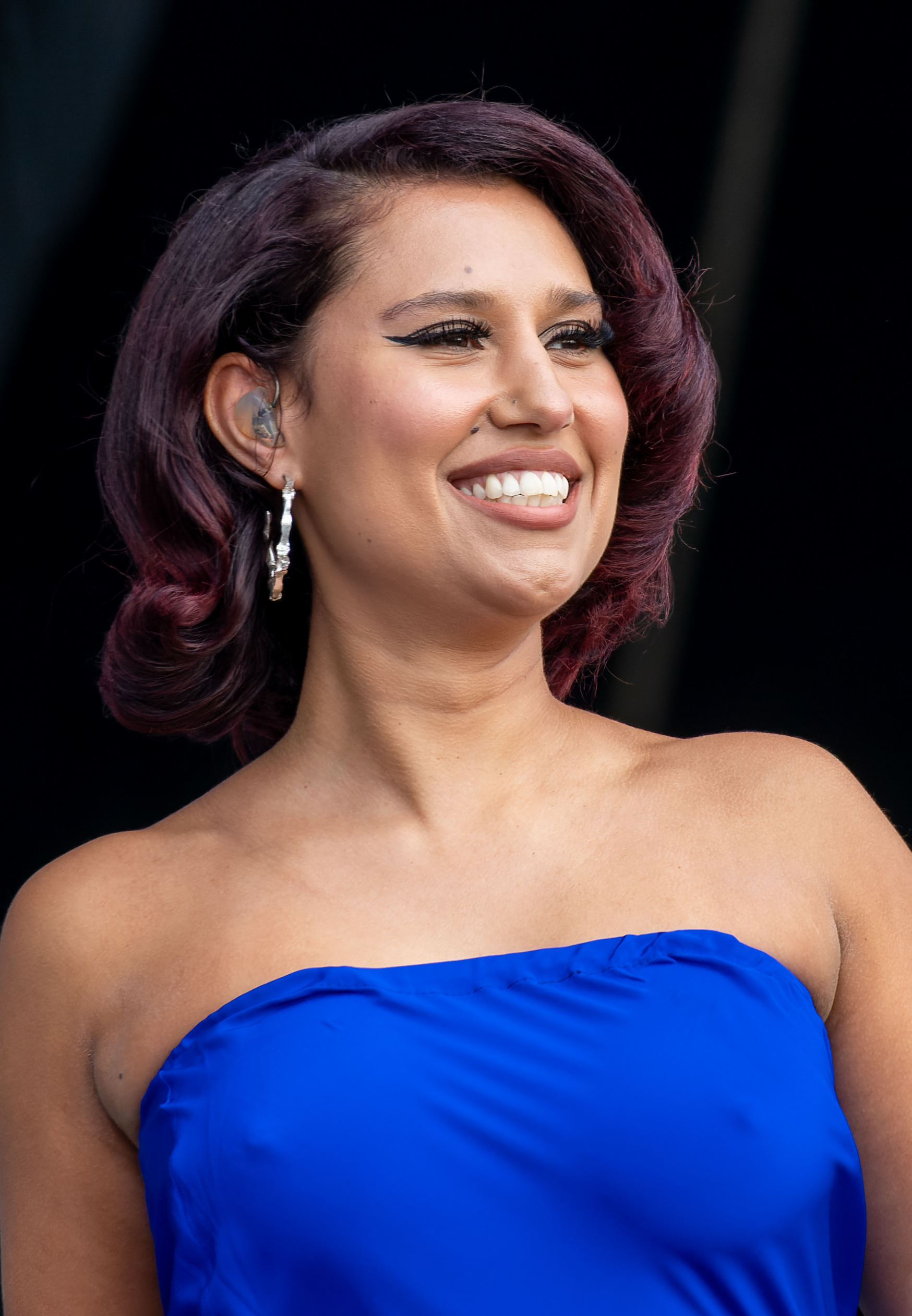
Raye in 2023

Raye signed to the distribution company Human Re Sources in mid-2022, and began to own her master recordings. On 30 June, she released her first independent single following her departure from Polydor, "Hard Out Here", alongside a music video depicting the early stages of an artist. "Black Mascara" was released in August 2022, and was followed by a dual single in October: "Escapism", featuring the rapper 070 Shake, and "The Thrill is Gone". All singles were part of Raye's debut studio album, My 21st Century Blues, which was released in February 2023. It peaked at number two on the UK Albums Chart, and was met with critical acclaim.

Raye embarked on a mini tour titled The Story So Far, which marked her first headlining shows in Europe and North America. This was followed by the My 21st Century Blues Tour from February 2023 to February 2024. "Escapism" became Raye's first song to reach number one in the UK, three months after its original release. It became her first entry on the US Billboard Hot 100 and her first top-ten entry on the Billboard Global 200. By the end of 2023, My 21st Century Blues had sold more than 60,000 copies in the UK. Billboard's Kyle Denis said that Raye gained "not just a successful album era, but also a devoted fan base and solidified career".

Throughout 2023, Raye opened for Lewis Capaldi's Broken by Desire to Be Heavenly Sent Tour in the UK, Kali Uchis's Red Moon in Venus Tour in North America, and SZA's SOS Tour in Europe. She also performed on the programs Jimmy Kimmel Live! and The Late Show with Stephen Colbert, and at the Glastonbury Festival 2023. "Prada" (2023), a collaboration with Cassö and D-Block Europe, reached number two on the UK singles chart and peaked atop the UK Dance Singles Chart for 31 weeks, later receiving a triple platinum certification from the British Phonographic Industry (BPI). In October 2023, Raye released her first live album, My 21st Century Symphony (Live at the Royal Albert Hall), recorded at the Royal Albert Hall alongside the Heritage Orchestra and the Flames Collective.

Raye performed a medley of some of her songs at the Brit Awards 2024. She was one of the songwriters on the song "Riiverdance" from Beyoncé's country music-inspired album Cowboy Carter (2024). On 6 April 2024, Raye appeared as the musical guest on Saturday Night Live; she performed "Escapism" and "Worth It", and also previewed an unreleased track tentatively titled "Let There Be Light", later released as the three-act single "Genesis" on 7 June. On 25 May 2024, Raye performed her first festival headline slot at BBC Radio 1's Big Weekend in Luton. She served as an opening act for Taylor Swift's the Eras Tour at Wembley Stadium in August 2024. Raye collaborated with the rapper Central Cee on "Moi", on which both artists sing and rap in English and French. On 13 September, she surprise-released the live album Live at Montreux Jazz Festival, featuring seven tracks recorded at the Montreux Jazz Festival, including a cover version of "It's a Man's Man's Man's World" (1966). Months later, Raye revealed that her car was stolen along with finished lyrics for tracks from her second studio album.

=== 2025–present: This Music May Contain Hope ===
In 2025, Raye performed "Oscar Winning Tears" at the 67th Annual Grammy Awards as part of a medley performed by nominees for Best New Artist. She also sang Adele's "Skyfall" (2012) at the 97th Academy Awards as part of a medley in honour to the James Bond franchise. Raye featured alongside Doja Cat on Lisa's single "Born Again" and collaborated with Mark Ronson on "Suzanne", which premiered as part of a music program led by the watch brand Audemars Piguet. She also co-wrote four tracks on Halle Bailey's album Love?... or Something Like It (2025), and co-wrote and co-produced several tracks on Jade Thirlwall's album That's Showbiz Baby (2025).

Raye debuted two tracks during her performance at the Glastonbury Festival in June 2025, including "Where Is My Husband!", which was subsequently released on 19 September 2025. The song became Raye's second chart-topper in the UK and her highest-charting release on both the Billboard Global 200 and the US Billboard Hot 100. She later released the singles "Nightingale Lane" on 27 February 2026 and "Click Clack Symphony", featuring the composer Hans Zimmer, on 20 March 2026; both reached the top twenty in the UK. All three singles were part of Raye's second studio album, This Music May Contain Hope, which was released on 27 March 2026. It received critical acclaim and became her first album to top the UK Albums Chart. Raye embarked on This Tour May Contain New Music in support of the album, performing 51 shows across Europe and North America from January to May 2026. She opened for Bruno Mars's The Romantic Tour later that year.

In November 2026, Raye received 11 nominations at the 69th Annual Grammy Awards, including Songwriter of the Year, Non-Classical; Album of the Year for This Music May Contain Hope; and Record and Song of the Year for "Where Is My Husband!". This made Raye the most nominated artist at that year's ceremony and tied her with Beyoncé for the most nominations received by a female artist in one year.

== Artistry ==
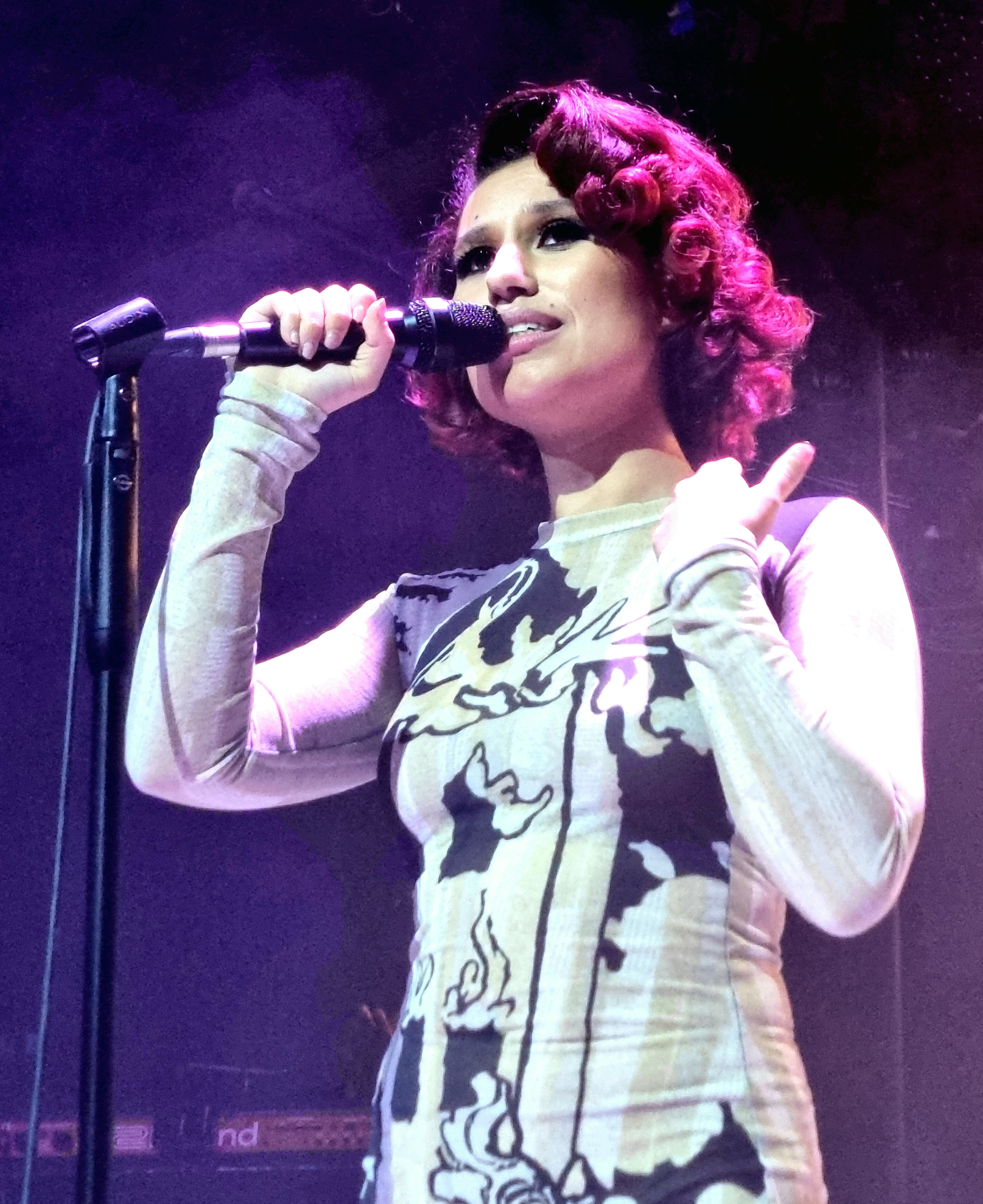
Raye performing in Kingston upon Thames (2023)

Music journalists have described Raye as a singer-songwriter, (Note: Attributed to Yasmin Rufo of BBC News, Sophie Harman of Clash, Catriona Innes of Harper's Bazaar, Ben Beaumont-Thomas of The Guardian, and Steven J. Horowitz of Variety) while additionally categorising her as a record producer. She is known for her music spanning a variety of genres; critics have predominantly identified it as R&B, pop, jazz, soul, and dance. (Note: Attributed to Elle's Jessica Burrell, Pitchfork's Aimee Cliff, Grazia's Nikki Peach, and Stereogum's James Rettig) She has stated that jazz is one of her favourite music genres, which she first discovered through Ella Fitzgerald and Louis Armstrong. Raye grew up listening to artists such as Jill Scott, James Brown, Nina Simone, and Alicia Keys. She also incorporated the music of Stevie Wonder and Wet Wet Wet, of whom her father was a fan, and has mentioned Beyoncé, Lauryn Hill, Dinah Washington, Sarah Vaughan, Etta James, Billie Holiday, Lady Gaga, and Christina Aguilera as influences. Raye's musical style and vocals have drawn comparisons to Amy Winehouse, whom she admires and whose artistry she has described as "irreplaceable and inimitable". Raye addresses the comparisons in her song "I Will Overcome" and regards the insults associated with them as "that same evil [that Amy faced]."

Raye explored R&B and electronic music on Welcome to the Winter. "Hotbox", one of its songs, was influenced by progressive R&B artists, including Jhené Aiko and Frank Ocean. According to Raye, Polydor pressured her to release "chart-friendly dance tracks". She struggled with her musical identity, retrospectively believing that her music was not consistent. My 21st Century Blues features elements of pop, soul, R&B, blues, hip-hop, gospel, and doo-wop. (Note: Attributed to Lauren O'Neill of Rolling Stone UK, Mark Savage of BBC News, Laura Snapes of The Guardian, and Moises Mendez II of Time) In one of the three parts of "Genesis", she blended these genres with big band instrumentation. This Music May Contain Hope incorporates blues, gospel, R&B, hip-hop, jazz-pop, swing jazz, retro-soul, neo-soul, funk, dubstep, house, and chamber music. (Note: Attributed to Vogue Adria's Tara Đukić, NME's Puah Ziwei, The Guardian's Alexis Petridis, The Independent's Helen Brown, Hot Press's Elaine Rand, and The Daily Telegraph's James Hall)

Raye has explored personal and contemporary issues in her music's lyrics. Her first song "Hotbox" describes her first use of marijuana, and she has written about similar encounters in the subsequent years. My 21st Century Blues contains recurrent themes such as drug addictions, self-insecurities, and sexual assault. On "Ice Cream Man", Raye sings about her experience being abused by a record producer as a teenager, while on "Body Dysmorphia", she describes her relationship with disordered eating. On "Genesis", influenced by the Nina Simone quote "It is an artist's duty to reflect the times", Raye deals with social media and global issues. This Music May Contain Hope is a concept album exploring themes of life, death, love, heartbreak, infidelity, resilience, the value of family, online criticism, and overcoming insecurities.

Raye frequently performs barefoot on stage.

== Achievements ==
Raye has won seven Brit Awards, four Global Awards, two Ivor Novello Awards, and two MTV Europe Music Awards—one as part of Artists for Grenfell. In 2019, she was given a BMI London Award for her "groundbreaking artistry, creative vision and impact on the future of music". She was one of the first recipients of the Brits Billion Award. Raye has also won a South Bank Sky Arts Award and a MOBO Award. Raye was included on the Forbes 30 Under 30 (Europe category) list in 2023, as well as BBC's lists Sound of 2017 and 100 Women 2024. She was named Musician of the Year at Harper's Bazaar's Woman of the Year 2024 event.

At the Brit Awards 2024, Raye broke the record for the artist with the most wins at a single ceremony, receiving British Artist of the Year, Best New Artist, Songwriter of the Year—becoming the first female recipient—Best R&B Act, British Album of the Year (for My 21st Century Blues), and Song of the Year (for "Escapism"). My 21st Century Blues was also nominated for the Mercury Prize, and "Genesis" received a nomination for the Ivor Novello Award for Best Song Musically and Lyrically. Raye was nominated for three Grammy Awards in 2025, including Best New Artist and Songwriter of the Year, Non-Classical. In 2026, she received the Hal David Starlight Award from the Songwriters Hall of Fame, while the Recording Academy awarded her the Harry Belafonte Best Song for Social Change Award for her songwriting on "Ice Cream Man". "Where Is My Husband!" was nominated for Song of the Year at the Brit Awards, and This Music May Contain Hope won the Mercury Prize. Raye was the most-nominated artist at the Grammy Awards 2027, receiving 11 nominations, including Album of the Year for This Music May Contain Hope, Record of the Year and Song of the Year for "Where Is My Husband!", and Songwriter of the Year, Non-Classical.

== Discography ==
- My 21st Century Blues (2023)
- This Music May Contain Hope (2026)

== Tours ==
Headlining

- Raye Live 2018 Tour (2018)
- Euphoric Sad Show Tour (2021)
- The Story So Far... Tour (2022)
- My 21st Century Blues Tour (2023–2024)
- This Tour May Contain New Music (2026)

Supporting

- Years & Years – Communion Tour (2015)
- Jess Glynne – Take Me Home Tour (2016)
- Rita Ora – The Girls Tour (2018)
- Halsey – Hopeless Fountain Kingdom Tour (2018)
- Khalid – Free Spirit World Tour (2019)
- Lewis Capaldi – Broken by Desire to Be Heavenly Sent Tour (2023)
- Kali Uchis – Red Moon in Venus Tour (2023)
- SZA – SOS Tour (2023)
- Taylor Swift – The Eras Tour (2024)
- Bruno Mars — The Romantic Tour (2026)

== Filmography ==
Television performances
Year	Title	Role	Notes	Ref.
2024	Saturday Night Live	Herself	Musical guest (season 49, episode 16)	
2025	Black Rabbit	Herself	Guest role	

== See also ==
- List of barefooters
