= Unsigned artist =

Music industry term

An unsigned artist or independent artist is a musician or musical group not under a contract with a record label. The terms are used in the music industry as a marketing technique. Bands that release their own material on self-published CDs can also be considered unsigned bands. Often unsigned bands primarily exist to perform at concerts.

In more recent years, the Internet has helped promote the music of unsigned bands. Artists often post their music as MP3s on websites like blogs, digital stores and other streaming platforms online for enhanced promotion.

In 2016, the Unsigned Music Awards was established in the UK. It is the first televised international awards ceremony to honor unsigned artists.

== History and current scene ==
Many unsigned artists used to sell their music and music-related merchandise without the financial support of a record label, while often seeking a recording contract through the recording of demos. Recently, the Internet has helped promote independent artistic material. Artists tend to post their music on websites such as Myspace and ILike, and sometimes have their music played on podcast shows. In recent times, artists such as Nine Inch Nails and Radiohead, who once had major label record deals, have started to release their music independently.

Various musicians have remained independent at the beginning of their musical careers but later on get a record deal and continue as a signed musician. But this concept changed when major artists such as the Eagles and Nine Inch Nails became independent and parted their ways with record labels such as Interscope.

Many services are offered to independent musicians by which the artists can retain the copyrights of their songs and also deliver their music to various stores.

== Internet promotion ==
Internet promotion has been the key for some bands for getting popular. Bands like the Arctic Monkeys, Owl City, and solo artists like Lily Allen have gained popularity through Myspace, although the Arctic Monkeys did not even know what MySpace was, and claimed that fans made it for them.

Unsigned bands have become more popular over time, with many having broken into the mainstream thanks to the internet. The advent of the internet and social media have provided unsigned bands with avenues to promote, market, and sell their music almost free of charge, without needing the financial or managerial assistance of a label.

Unsigned charts are now being promoted on almost all underground music sites and has seen many of the domain owners spending large amounts of money on developing these charts to bring bands to them. A number of these are now additionally registered with the official charts.

Blog sites have become popular, as they regularly feature reviews or interviews with unsigned artists. Other blog sites have offered helpful guidance and resources for new unsigned artists. Similar to bloggers, music curators including podcasts, DJs, and YouTube channels are all dedicated to finding quality new songs from unsigned artists for online audiences to discover.

== Record labels ==
Major record company Universal Music entered into a joint venture with Tunecore to distribute albums online on major stores. The record labels which entered into venture are Interscope (Interscope Digital Distribution), Universal Motown (Unimo Digital Distribution), Island Def Jam (IDJ FirstLook) and Universal Republic (Republic Digital Distribution). Island Def Jam Music Group partnered with Tunecore to launch IDJ Firstlook, a new web portal that provides unsigned artists with potential access to major label services as worldwide distribution and marketing.

=== Independent vanity record labels ===
Artists can also create their own record labels and sell their music under the label's imprint as well. Services such as Nimbit gives facilities for independent musicians to release their music independently as well as under a record label created by the artists themselves. Other efforts made in this field include Magnatune, an independent record label based in Berkeley, California, United States.

== Notable unsigned artists ==
Notable artists who have never been signed to a major record label include Djo, Tom MacDonald, Illslick, Chance the Rapper, Esprit D'Air, REN, Macklemore, Noname, David Choi, Youngohm, and Ryan Upchurch. Artists that found independent success after leaving their labels include R&B singer Tinashe and rapper Tech N9ne, who started his own label Strange Music with business partner Travis O'Guin.

== See also ==
- Independent music
- Free agent
