= Escapism (song) =

2022 single by Raye

Single by Raye featuring 070 Shake

from the album My 21st Century Blues
- Released: 12 October 2022
- Genre: R&B; electropop; hip-hop
- Length: 4:32: 3:06 (radio edit)
- Label: Human Re Sources
- Songwriters: Rachel Keen; Mike Sabath; Danielle Balbuena
- Producer: Mike Sabath

Raye singles chronology
"Black Mascara" (2022)	"Escapism" / "The Thrill Is Gone" (2022)	"You Can't Change Me" (2022)

070 Shake singles chronology
"Body" (2022)	"Escapism" (2022)	"Black Dress" (2023)

Music video
- "Escapism" on YouTube

"Escapism." is a song by the British singer-songwriter Raye featuring the American rapper 070 Shake. It was released independently through Human Re Sources on 12 October 2022, as the third single from Raye's debut studio album, My 21st Century Blues (2023), and as a dual single with "The Thrill Is Gone". Both artists wrote the song with its producer, Mike Sabath. "Escapism." is an uptempo R&B, electropop, and hip-hop song with lyrics about escaping from reality and dealing with heartbreak.

"Escapism." is considered Raye's breakout single as a solo artist. It gained attention on TikTok in 2022, became her first number-one single in the UK, and has been certified quadruple platinum by the British Phonographic Industry (BPI). It also topped the charts in Ireland and Denmark and entered the top-10 of the charts in over twenty countries. It has been certified gold, platinum, or higher in over twelve regions. It became both Raye's and 070 Shake's first song to chart on the US Billboard Hot 100, peaking at number 22.

Raye and Otis Dominique directed the song's accompanying music video. It depicts the singer turning to "partying, drinking, and drugs to escape her emotions and numb her feelings" after breaking up with her boyfriend. "Escapism." won various accolades, including Song of the Year at the Brit Awards 2024, Best Social Trended Song at the Global Awards, and Best Contemporary Song at the Ivor Novello Awards. Additionally, it was nominated for Best Independent Track and Best Independent Video at the AIM Independent Music Awards, as well as Best British Pop Single at the Popjustice £20 Music Prize.

== Composition and lyrics ==
"Escapism" incorporates trip-hop in its production. Raye stated that she "love[s] how rebellious" "Escapism" is for disregarding "the standard" of "pop music structure", particularly being "longer than three minutes and twenty seconds".

The song depicts Raye on a post-breakup spree of unhealthy coping mechanisms, engaging in hookups, drugs, and alcohol. Raye explained that the song is about escaping from reality and dealing with heartbreak. In an interview with Clash, Raye revealed that she wrote the song in a log cabin in Utah: "Me and a friend hired a car, and drove up there, in the middle of winter, through the snow and everything! 'Escapism' is a story about running away from everything as fast as you can. The lyrics are about just leaving everyone on read, and going out on your own. It came from a messy time, but as humans, we just have to keep surviving!"

== Critical reception ==
Amit Vaidya of Rolling Stone India named "Escapism" one of the Best International Songs of 2022. They added how "Escapism" showcases Raye's "journey to achieving her musical freedom" and how "Escapism" "perfectly captures the angst and the aura of the singer—a vocal shape-shifter who now is the boss and we just love it!"

=== Awards ===
The song won Best Contemporary Song at the 2023 Ivor Novello Awards, "Best Social Trended Song" at the 2023 Global Awards, and "Song of the Year" at the Brit Awards 2024. It was nominated for "Best Independent Track" and "Best Independent Video" at the 2023 AIM Independent Music Awards, and "Best British Pop Single" at the Popjustice £20 Music Award Show.

=== Year-end lists ===
Critics' rankings of "Escapism"
Publication	List	Rank	Ref.
BBC News	Best Songs of 2022	17	
Billboard	Best Songs of 2023	20	

== Commercial performance ==
After going viral on TikTok, "Escapism" charted on the UK Singles Chart at number 31 on 25 November 2022, which marked 070 Shake's first entry on the chart. The feat marked the singer's first charting solo single since Raye became an independent artist in 2021. The following week, the song ascended to number six, becoming Raye's first single as a solo artist to reach the top ten in the UK. On 9 December, "Escapism" climbed to number two, becoming Raye's highest-charting single to date, passing her collaborations "You Don't Know Me" with Jax Jones (2016) and "Bed" with Joel Corry and David Guetta (2021). Following the Christmas period, "Escapism" ascended to number one on the UK Singles Chart in January 2023, marking both Raye and 070 Shake's first chart-topping single of their careers.

In the United States, "Escapism" became both artists' first song to chart on the Billboard Hot 100, peaking at number 22. In Canada, "Escapism" became Raye's first charting single as a lead artist of her career on the Canadian Hot 100, peaking at number nine on the chart dated 21 January 2023.

== Music video ==
A music video for the song was released on 9 November 2022, directed by Raye and Otis Dominique. It reflects the song's lyrics, with Raye turning to "partying, drinking, and drugs to escape her emotions and numb her feelings" after breaking up with her boyfriend. The video makes use of point-of-view cameras. In an interview with Shots, Raye mentioned, "We worked really hard to create an honest depiction of where I was at that time in my life. It was fun and wild. We shot it over a couple of days and wore point-of-view cameras during a wild night out at many different clubs. I pushed myself outside of my comfort zone and I ran 150 metres in 5-inch heels. We really took it there!"

== Live performances ==
On 15 October 2022, Raye performed "Escapism" live for the first time on Later... with Jools Holland. In December 2022, the singer released a live performance recorded at Metropolis Studios in London. On 13 February 2023, Raye made her US network television debut performance on The Late Show with Stephen Colbert. On 26 September 2023, Raye performed a live version of "Escapism" at the Royal Albert Hall, London, accompanied by the Heritage Orchestra and the Flames Collective gospel choir, with Anna Lapwood on the venue's organ. On 6 April 2024, Raye performed "Escapism" on Saturday Night Live.

== Charts ==
=== Weekly charts ===
Weekly chart performance for "Escapism"
Chart (2022–2024)	Peak position
Australia (ARIA)	3
Austria (Ö3 Austria Top 40)	4
Belgium (Ultratop 50 Flanders)	18
Belgium (Ultratop 50 Wallonia)	26
Canada Hot 100 (Billboard)	9
Canada CHR/Top 40 (Billboard)	4
Canada Hot AC (Billboard)	29
Croatia (Billboard)	21
Czech Republic Singles Digital (ČNS IFPI)	3
Denmark (Tracklisten)	1
Finland (Suomen virallinen lista)	3
France (SNEP)	35
Germany (GfK)	3
Global 200 (Billboard)	7
Greece International (IFPI)	2
Hungary (Rádiós Top 40)	33
Hungary (Single Top 40)	14
Hungary (Stream Top 40)	7
Iceland (Billboard)	2
India International (IMI)	8
Ireland (IRMA)	1
Italy (FIMI)	59
Latvia (LAIPA)	7
Latvia Airplay (LaIPA)	7
Lebanon Airplay (Lebanese Top 20)	3
Lithuania (AGATA)	5
Luxembourg (Billboard)	5
MENA (IFPI)	4
Netherlands (Dutch Top 40)	10
Netherlands (Single Top 100)	4
New Zealand (Recorded Music NZ)	2
Nigeria (TurnTable Top 100)	33
Norway (VG-lista)	4
Poland (Polish Streaming Top 100)	10
Portugal (AFP)	10
Romania (Billboard)	13
Singapore (RIAS)	8
Slovakia Airplay (ČNS IFPI)	27
Slovakia Singles Digital (ČNS IFPI)	2
South Africa (Billboard)	22
Sweden (Sverigetopplistan)	4
Switzerland (Schweizer Hitparade)	6
Turkey International Airplay (Radiomonitor Türkiye)	1
UK Singles (Official Charts)	1
UK Independent (Official Charts)	1
US Billboard Hot 100	22
US Adult Pop Airplay (Billboard)	23
US Dance Airplay (Billboard)	5
US Pop Airplay (Billboard)	6
US Rhythmic Airplay (Billboard)	4

=== Year-end charts ===
2023 year-end chart performance for "Escapism"
Chart (2023)	Position
Australia (ARIA)	10
Austria (Ö3 Austria Top 40)	41
Belgium (Ultratop 50 Flanders)	68
Belgium (Ultratop 50 Wallonia)	57
Bulgaria Airplay (PROPHON)	6
Canada (Canadian Hot 100)	12
Denmark (Tracklisten)	30
France (SNEP)	198
Germany (Official German Charts)	24
Global 200 (Billboard)	23
Iceland (Tónlistinn)	11
Netherlands (Dutch Top 40)	66
Netherlands (Single Top 100)	19
New Zealand (Recorded Music NZ)	12
Poland (Polish Streaming Top 100)	88
Sweden (Sverigetopplistan)	49
Switzerland (Schweizer Hitparade)	24
UK Singles (OCC)	3
US Billboard Hot 100	48
US Dance/Mix Show Airplay (Billboard)	28
US Mainstream Top 40 (Billboard)	22
US Rhythmic (Billboard)	22

2024 year-end chart performance for "Escapism"
Chart (2024)	Position
UK Singles (OCC)	87

== Certifications ==
Certifications for "Escapism"
Region	Certification	Certified units/sales
Australia (ARIA)	6× Platinum	420,000^{‡}
Austria (IFPI Austria)	Platinum	30,000^{‡}
Belgium (BRMA)	Platinum	40,000^{‡}
Brazil (Pro-Música Brasil)	Diamond	160,000^{‡}
Canada (Music Canada)	6× Platinum	480,000^{‡}
Denmark (IFPI Danmark)	2× Platinum	180,000^{‡}
France (SNEP)	Diamond	333,333^{‡}
Germany (BVMI)	Platinum	600,000^{‡}
Italy (FIMI)	Platinum	100,000^{‡}
New Zealand (RMNZ)	4× Platinum	120,000^{‡}
Norway (IFPI Norway)	2× Platinum	120,000^{‡}
Poland (ZPAV)	2× Platinum	100,000^{‡}
Portugal (AFP)	2× Platinum	20,000^{‡}
Spain (Promusicae)	Gold	30,000^{‡}
United Kingdom (BPI)	4× Platinum	2,400,000^{‡}
United States (RIAA)	4× Platinum	4,000,000^{‡}
Streaming
Greece (IFPI Greece)	4× Platinum	8,000,000^{†}
Sweden (GLF)	Platinum	12,000,000^{†}
^{‡} Sales+streaming figures based on certification alone.^{†} Streaming-only figures based on certification alone.

== Release history ==
Release history and formats for "Escapism"
Region	Date	Format(s)	Version	Label(s)	Ref.
Various	12 October 2022	Digital download; streaming	Original	Human Re Sources	
Various	25 November 2022	Digital download; streaming	Sped up	Human Re Sources	
Various	30 November 2022	Digital download; streaming	Live at Metropolis	Human Re Sources	
Various	7 December 2022	Digital download; streaming	Slowed down	Human Re Sources	
United States	9 January 2023	Contemporary hit radio; rhythmic contemporary radio	Original	Human Re Sources; The Orchard	
Various	2 February 2024	Digital download; streaming	4am remix	Human Re Sources	
