= Human Re Sources =

American record label

- Industry: Music & Entertainment
- Genre: Various
- Founded: 2016; 10 years ago
- Founder: Julius Erving III
- Headquarters: Los Angeles, United States
- Key people: Julius Erving III; Junko Takeda
- Parent: The Orchard
- Website: human-re-sources.com

Human Re Sources is an American artist distribution company founded in 2016 by Julius Erving III. The company releases albums worldwide and operates across a range of genres.

In December 2020, Human Re Sources was acquired by Sony Music Entertainment, after which the company became part of The Orchard’s global distribution, artist, and label services brand.

== History ==
=== 2016–2021 ===
Human Re Sources was founded in 2016 by Julius Erving III, who was previously an artist manager at Maverick. The company officially launched in 2017 with signed artists including YBN Nahmir, Charlotte Lawrence, Spencer Barnett, Dame D.O.L.L.A., Ernest K and Six60.

In 2019, Human Re Sources became part of Q&A, a modern music and technology company co-founded and launched that same year by Troy Carter, Suzy Ryoo and Erving. In December 2019, it was announced that Human Re Sources had expanded their operations to the United Kingdom, with newly-appointed A&R executive Amal Omari and Vice President of Creator Services Matt Ott.

In June 2020, Human Re Sources announced that they had signed the UK artists Christian Alexander, Oscar Welsh, and Matilda Cole, joining their British roster including Lancey Foux and ADMT. Their successes at the time in the United States included the artists Baby Rose, Pink Sweat$ and Ant Clemons. In December 2020, Erving sold Human Re Sources to Sony Music Entertainment, after which the partnership with Q&A was dissolved. Subsequently, the company became part of The Orchard, and Erving became the Executive Vice President of Creative Development for Sony Music Entertainment. Additionally, the artists 2Tone and Grip had been signed to Human Re Sources prior to the move.

=== 2022–present ===
In April 2022, Mark Jackson joined Human Re Sources as its Vice President and head of its operations in Atlanta, Georgia. In June 2022, Human Re Sources signed British singer-songwriter Raye, after her departure from her previous label, Polydor, which she had been signed to since 2014. Following the signing, the company stated:

"We are thrilled to welcome RAYE to the Human Re Sources family. We are lucky to have landed an artist with such an amazing footprint. We intend to support RAYE’s vision, as an artist, a powerful young woman, and a superstar!"

In October 2022, Raye released her single "Escapism" under Human Re Sources, which saw major commercial success, reaching number one in the United Kingdom and the top five in numerous other countries. This was followed by the release of her debut album, My 21st Century Blues (2023), which was met with further commercial and critical success and won the award for British Album of the Year at the 2024 Brit Awards, one of six awards she received at the ceremony.

In January 2023, Junko Takeda took over as the new Vice President of Human Re Sources, and the overseer of the companies' operations in Atlanta and Los Angeles. New artists signed to Human Re Sources around this time included Kelz and Lekan.

As of 2024, additional artists signed to Human Re Sources included Brent Faiyaz and Eva Ruiz. In March 2024 it was announced that Human Re Sources had partnered with the Nigerian-based music magazine The Native, whereby the company will spotlight underground and alternative artists through The Native's Under Live showcase. The showcase gives emerging acts across Nigeria a chance to further their craft and showcase their skill in front of a live audience.

In February 2026, American singer-songwriter Jill Scott released her sixth studio album, To Whom This May Concern, under Human Re Sources. The album was met with critical acclaim, and reached number 33 on the US Billboard 200.

In March 2026, Raye released her second studio album, This Music May Contain Hope, which was met with critical acclaim and commercial success, reaching number one on the UK Albums Chart. The album's lead single, "Where Is My Husband?" (2025), became her second number one song in the United Kingdom, and has amassed sales of over 1.1 million copies in the country as of March 2026. Commenting on her success, Erving stated, "Raye does the heavy lifting, and her managers are amazing, which is paramount for an independent artist. They will see to it that this classic album gets the proper light".

== Roster ==
As of 2026, Human Re Sources is home to a range of artists including:

- Akia
- Buddah Bless
- Dxledward
- Eva Ruiz
- H1mward
- Jill Scott
- Lancey
- Lakeyah
- Lekan
- Maeta
- Natanya
- Raye
- SuperJazzClub
- SwaVay

== See also ==
=== Affiliated labels/imprints ===
- The Orchard
- Sony Music Entertainment

=== Other ===
- Independent record labels
- List of record labels
