= This Tour May Contain New Music =

2026 concert tour by Raye

- Tour by Raye
- Promotional poster
- Location: Europe; North America
- Associated album: This Music May Contain Hope
- Start date: 22 January 2026
- End date: 20 May 2026
- Legs: 3
- No. of shows: 51
- Supporting acts: Absolutely; Amma
- Producer: Metropolis Music; SJM Concerts; DF Concerts; Wasserman
- Website: rayeofficial.com#tour

Raye concert tour chronology
- My 21st Century Blues Tour (2023-25); This Tour May Contain New Music (2026)

This Tour May Contain New Music was a concert tour by the British singer-songwriter Raye, in support of her second studio album, This Music May Contain Hope (2026). The tour began on 22 January 2026 in Łódź, Poland, at the Atlas Arena, and concluded on 20 May 2026 at The O2 Arena in London, England. The tour was supported by Raye's sisters, the singer-songwriters Absolutely and Amma.

== Background ==
Throughout 2025, Raye performed at multiple festivals in Europe and North America, including Glastonbury Festival, Lollapalooza Paris and Newport Jazz Festival and debuted her new single "Where Is My Husband!", which was released on 19 September 2025 through Human Re Sources. It was billed as the lead single from Raye's second studio album, which was made available to pre-order the same date and was released in 2026. On 21 September 2025, Raye announced the tour, with forty shows across Europe and North America spanning from January 2026 through May 2026. Tickets went on sale four days later, with an artist pre-sale which ran for two days prior to the general dale dates. On September 23, 2025, Raye added an additional second date to Amsterdam, Manchester, Glasgow, Birmingham, New York and Los Angeles and a third show in London due to demand. On September 25, 2025, Raye added another show to Dublin and fourth show to London. During the general sale the next day, on September 26, 2025, Raye added a fifth and final (sixth) night to London, following the North American dates in May.

== Setlist ==
This set list is from the 22 January 2026 concert at the Atlas Arena in Łódź, Poland. It is not representative of all shows during the tour.

1. "Intro: Girl Under the Grey Cloud"
2. "I Will Overcome"
3. "Where Is My Husband!"
4. "The Thrill Is Gone"
5. "Skin & Bones"
6. "Suzanne"
7. "Beware.. The South London Lover Boy"
8. "Flip a Switch"
9. "Decline"
10. "Five Star Hotels"
11. "Winter Woman"
12. "Hard Out Here"
13. "Genesis, Pt. II"
14. "Fly Me to the Moon" (cover)
15. "Worth It"
16. "Nightingale Lane"
17. "Ice Cream Man"
18. "I Know You're Hurting"
19. "Oscar Winning Tears"
20. "Click Clack Symphony"
21. "Black Prada Brits"
22. "Secrets"
23. "Bed"
24. "You Don't Know Me"
25. "Black Mascara"
26. "Prada"
27. "Donk"
28. "Joy"
29. "Escapism"

== Shows ==
List of 2026 concerts, showing date, city, country and venue
| Date (2026) | City | Country | Venue |
|---|---|---|---|
| 22 January | Łódź | Poland | Atlas Arena |
| 24 January | Berlin | Germany | Uber Arena |
| 25 January | Prague | Czech Republic | O2 Arena |
| 27 January | Amsterdam | Netherlands | Ziggo Dome |
| 28 January | Amsterdam | Netherlands | Ziggo Dome |
| 30 January | Bologna | Italy | Unipol Arena |
| 1 February | Antwerp | Belgium | AFAS Dome |
| 3 February | Copenhagen | Denmark | Royal Arena |
| 5 February | Oslo | Norway | Unity Arena |
| 7 February | Stockholm | Sweden | Avicii Arena |
| 10 February | Cologne | Germany | Lanxess Arena |
| 11 February | Zürich | Switzerland | Hallenstadion |
| 13 February | Barcelona | Spain | Palau Sant Jordi |
| 15 February | Paris | France | Accor Arena |
| 17 February | Manchester | England | Co-op Live |
| 18 February | Manchester | England | Co-op Live |
| 20 February | Glasgow | Scotland | OVO Hydro |
| 21 February | Glasgow | Scotland | OVO Hydro |
| 23 February | Birmingham | England | bp pulse LIVE |
| 24 February | Birmingham | England | bp pulse LIVE |
| 26 February | London | England | The O_{2} Arena |
| 27 February | London | England | The O_{2} Arena |
| 1 March | London | England | The O_{2} Arena |
| 2 March | London | England | The O_{2} Arena |
| 4 March | Dublin | Ireland | 3Arena |
| 5 March | Dublin | Ireland | 3Arena |
| 31 March | Sacramento | United States | Channel 24 |
| 2 April | Vancouver | Canada | Thunderbird Sports Centre |
| 3 April | Seattle | United States | WaMu Theater |
| 6 April | Denver | United States | Fillmore Auditorium |
| 8 April | Minneapolis | United States | State Theatre |
| 10 April | Chicago | United States | Auditorium Theatre |
| 12 April | Montreal | Canada | Place Bell |
| 13 April | Toronto | Canada | Coca-Cola Coliseum |
| 15 April | New York City | United States | Radio City Music Hall |
| 16 April | New York City | United States | Radio City Music Hall |
| 19 April | Philadelphia | United States | The Met Presented by Highmark |
| 20 April | Boston | United States | MGM Music Hall at Fenway |
| 26 April | Washington, D.C. | United States | The Anthem |
| 28 April | Atlanta | United States | Coca-Cola Roxy |
| 29 April | Nashville | United States | Ryman Auditorium |
| 1 May | Houston | United States | 713 Music Hall |
| 3 May | Dallas | United States | South Side Ballroom |
| 4 May | Austin | United States | Moody Amphitheater |
| 7 May | Phoenix | United States | Arizona Financial Theatre |
| 8 May | Las Vegas | United States | The Chelsea |
| 10 May | San Francisco | United States | Bill Graham Civic Auditorium |
| 12 May | Los Angeles | United States | Greek Theatre |
| 13 May | Los Angeles | United States | Greek Theatre |
| 19 May | London | England | The O_{2} Arena |
| 20 May | London | England | The O_{2} Arena |
