= This Music May Contain Hope =

Studio album by Raye
- Released: 27 March 2026
- Recorded: 2023–2026
- Genres: Pop; jazz; R&B
- Length: 73:30
- Label: Human Re Sources
- Producers: Pete Clements; Chris Hill; Punctual; Raye; Tom Richards; Jordan Riley; Alex Robinson; Mike Sabath; Toneworld; Hans Zimmer

Raye chronology
Live at Montreux Jazz Festival (2024)	This Music May Contain Hope (2026)

Singles from This Music May Contain Hope
- 1. "Where Is My Husband!" Released: 19 September 2025; 2. "Nightingale Lane" Released: 27 February 2026; 3. "Click Clack Symphony" Released: 20 March 2026; 4. "Joy" Released: 7 September 2026

This Music May Contain Hope (Note: Stylised as This Music May Contain Hope. and in all caps) is the second studio album by the British singer-songwriter Raye. It was released independently on 27 March 2026 through Human Re Sources. Raye wrote and co-produced the album with various collaborators, including Jordan Riley, Chris Hill, Mike Sabath, Tom Richards, Pete Clements and Hans Zimmer. It includes features from Zimmer, Al Green, and Raye's sisters, Amma and Absolutely. The album incorporates sounds of jazz, big band, soul, blues, and orchestral pop, and explores themes of hope and liberation, and the complexities of human emotion.

The album was preceded by the release of three singles; the lead single "Where Is My Husband!" was released on 19 September 2025, the second single "Nightingale Lane" was released on 27 February 2026, and the third single "Click Clack Symphony" was released on 20 March 2026. The former became Raye's second number-one on the UK singles chart and reached number six on the Billboard Global 200, while the latter two songs entered the top twenty on the UK charts. The album's fourth single, "Joy", featuring Amma and Absolutely, was released on 7 September 2026.

Upon release, This Music May Contain Hope was met with universal acclaim from music critics, who praised the album's hopeful theme, diverse array of genres, and Raye's vocal performance. It topped the charts in Belgium, the United Kingdom, the Netherlands, Scotland, and Switzerland, while also reaching the top ten in sixteen countries. To support the album, Raye embarked on a concert tour, This Tour May Contain New Music, which began in January 2026 and concluded in May of the same year. The album received the 2026 Mercury Prize, and nominations for Album of the Year and Best Pop Vocal Album at the 69th Annual Grammy Awards.

== Background ==
Following the release of her debut, My 21st Century Blues, in February 2023, Raye embarked on a two-year promotional cycle, including a world tour. During this period, she released the live albums My 21st Century Symphony (Live at the Royal Albert Hall) (2023), and Live at Montreux Jazz Festival (2024). J Erving, founder and CEO of Human Re Sources, attributed the success of her debut and the anticipation for her second album to this extensive live presence.

On her birthday in October 2024, Raye shared to her Instagram that song books containing material for her upcoming second studio album had been stolen along with her car, and that there would be "no second album any time soon". In 2025, Raye began teasing the album on her social media, including a post shared to her Instagram in October 2025, where she mentioned that she was "writing a lot" and that she "can't wait to show [her fans] this new music". During a September 2025 interview with the BBC, Raye explained that she planned to put out an album "in the first half of next year", but that she still needed to finish it. In a subsequent interview with Capital UK the following month, she revealed that her stolen car containing the song books had been found, which she was informed of "two to three months ago" by the police, and that the books were untouched.

== Writing and recording ==
Music is medicine, I've always said that. I guess I'm in the process of making medicine for myself that I can share with the world. I want us all to say to ourselves that it's going to be all right, and I'm going to have faith in the seeds that I've planted beneath the snow. I wanted to create something that is a hug, bed or soft place for that person who needs it.

— Raye, talking about the album's theme

Development for This Music May Contain Hope began in late 2023. Throughout the recording process, Raye aimed to maintain a central theme of hope, and to create a project that is "not just for [her]" but to encourage other people to "not give up on life". Raye likened the process of making the album to creating "medicine" for herself that she could "share with the world". In an Apple Music interview with Zane Lowe, Raye discussed the creation of the songs on the album. She explained that she and Mike Sabath took a trip to Big Bear Lake, California, in early 2025, where the pair came up with the tracks "Where Is My Husband!", "Skin & Bones", "Joy", and "Beware.. the South London Lover Boy".

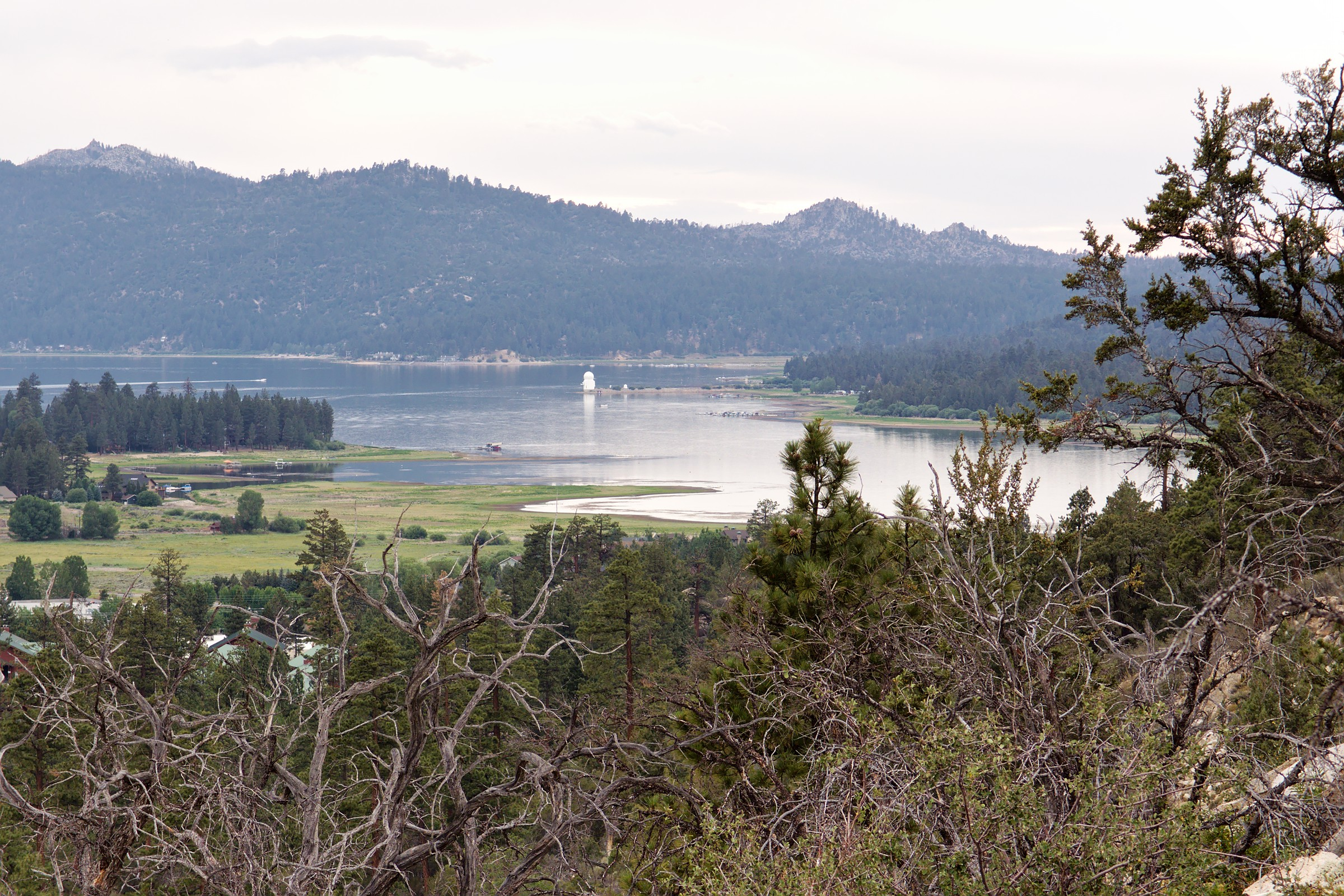
Raye came up with songs for the album with producer Mike Sabath during a trip to Big Bear Lake, California (pictured) in early 2025.

The album's opening track "Intro: Girl Under the Grey Cloud", aims to expand on the idea that "we are all the main characters of our own lives". The term "sonder" inspired Raye while creating the song, meaning "the awareness that other people all have their own complex set of feelings and experiences". For "Joy", Raye incorporated a vocal loop sampled from a James Brown recording, specifically selecting a section where Brown utters the phrase "Mr Ray, are you somebody?".

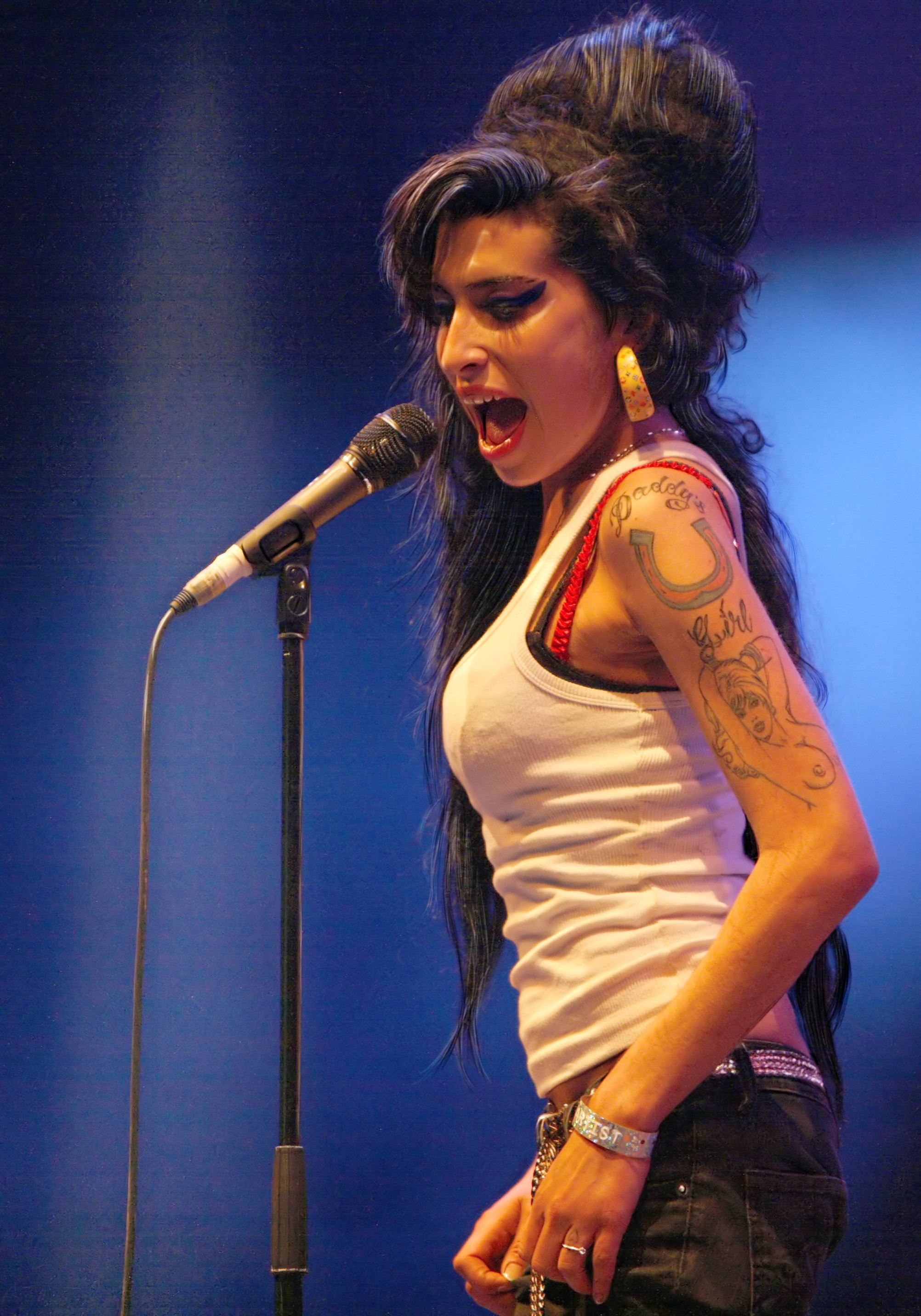
Raye addresses comparisons to British singer-songwriter Amy Winehouse (pictured) on the track "I Will Overcome".

Another central track, "I Will Overcome", discusses comparisons to British singer-songwriter Amy Winehouse with the lyrics "And it's funny, some people say I remind them of Amy / Some spit through their keyboards, I'll never amount / And the evil in insults, the arrows from your tongue / Is the same devils you tortured her with". Regarding the track, Raye explained that "everyone around the world loves [Amy Winehouse] now and loves what she created now" but that "she is not here anymore". Raye compared insults she has received to what the British press put Winehouse through, which she labelled as "so evil and so dark", though clarifying that her experience is a "microcosm" of what Winehouse endured. The song is about "encouraging herself" and not listening to the "wicked world that wants to whisper you that you can't and you won't [sic]".

Raye identified "I Know You're Hurting" as one of the first songs recorded for the album. She explained that during a trip for her 26th birthday in October 2023, she was having a "really real conversation talking about mental health in men [sic]" with her band, after which she "got on a piano and said a little prayer" asking for a song "to tell this story really beautifully". The result was her and her band writing the song in real time and ending up with a twelve minute demo. She later decided to address the song as a "letter to her friend who was going through a lot", and stated that the wider purpose of the song is to allow people to "grieve and feel and hopefully come out the other side".

The song "Fields" was recorded in London as a collaboration between Raye and her grandfather, Michael. A former songwriter whose work had previously been used without credit, Michael travelled to London to co-write and record the track with Raye. The collaboration was intended to honour his musical legacy and provide him with a professional platform.

== Composition ==
Consisting of 17 tracks with a total runtime of 73 minutes, This Music May Contain Hope is a concept album structured around four distinct seasons: autumn, winter, spring, and summer, with each side of the vinyl representing the different seasons. The autumn section includes tracks 1–4, the winter section includes tracks 5–8, the spring section includes tracks 9–12, and the summer section includes tracks 13–17. According to Ashanti Meadows from Melodic Magazine, This Music May Contain Hope is intended to "span the complexities of human emotion".

Musically, This Music May Contain Hope blends sounds of jazz, orchestral pop, blues, big band, and soul. As noted by Riff Magazine and The Diamondback, Raye also works electropop into the track "Life Boat", blending "distorted vocals" and "spoken interludes". Raye has described the album's sound as a "form of rebellion" from the "former model she existed in for so many years" of everything being "so simple and so minimal". Speaking to Apple Music, she stated the record "embraces maximalism" and that she "expressed and explored any genre [she] wanted to, from big band swing to hip hop [sic]".

NME likened This Music May Contain Hope to an "extravagant theatre performance" and highlighted Raye's vocal performance on the album, while Slant Magazine described Raye as refusing "to be pigeonholed into any one genre". Meanwhile, Rolling Stone described the project as being full of "old-school show-tune[s]", with elements of big-band, "retro Sixties" R&B, the "occasional club beat", and endless "glamorously tragic" scenarios.

== Release and promotion ==
On 19 September 2025, Raye made the album available for pre-order and gave a 2026 release date. On 22 January 2026, she announced that the album, titled This Music May Contain Hope, would be released on 27 March, through Human Re Sources. In an interview with Elle in January, Raye revealed that the record's intro and first track would be "Girl Under the Gray Cloud" and "I Will Overcome", respectively. The full track list was posted to Raye's Instagram on 11 March. Regarding the vinyl LP release, Raye clarified that the mixes aren't the finalised versions heard on digital editions of the album, describing it as a "first edition", due to the deadline for the vinyl to be pressed.

=== Live performances ===
Raye performing at the Auditorium Theatre in Chicago on 10 April 2026

Raye first performed material from This Music May Contain Hope at the Glastonbury Festival in June 2025, including the live debut of "Where Is My Husband!", known at the time as "Where the Hell Is My Husband?". In July, Raye performed new material from the album at the 2025 Montreux Jazz Festival. Her performance of "I Know You're Hurting" and "Where Is My Husband!" from the festival were later released on 12-inch vinyl through Raye's official store on 26 December. On 18 September, Raye announced on her social media that the album would be supported by a concert tour, set to begin in January 2026. In October 2025, Raye performed a seven-minute set at the NFL London Games halftime show, where she sang "Where Is My Husband!" as part of her setlist. On 6 December, Raye performed at the Capital Jingle Bell Ball, where she sang songs from This Music May Contain Hope, including "Where Is My Husband!" and "I Know You're Hurting".

In January 2026, Raye embarked on her concert tour entitled This Tour May Contain New Music, which concluded in May of the same year. The tour spanned 51 shows across Europe and North America. On 28 February, Raye performed "Where Is My Husband!" at the Brit Awards, as well as the live debut of "Nightingale Lane". On 27 March, Raye performed "Where Is My Husband!" at the 2026 iHeartRadio Music Awards ceremony. On 6 June, Raye performed at the Capital Summertime Ball, where she sang "Where Is My Husband!" as part of her setlist. On 28 June, Raye attended the BET Awards 2026, where she performed "Nightingale Lane". On 3 July, Raye held a one-off concert as part of the 2026 Montreux Jazz Festival titled "This Stage May Contain Moments In Time", co-created with Swiss luxury watch company Audemars Piguet. The concert was held at the Auditorium Stravinski and featured special guest appearances from Mark Ronson and Alicia Keys. Raye sang a setlist of songs including "Nightingale Lane" and "Skin & Bones".

In August 2026, Raye performed as the headline act at Brighton Pride in Preston Park. Her set heavily featured content from This Music May Contain Hope which she performed alongside her band. During the closing number, "Where Is My Husband!", the line "Your husband is coming" was replaced with a sound bite of Wendy Williams' viral quote "Your husband is gay!" which was met with applause from the audience. T-shirts were on sale as merchandise featuring the line and an image of Raye wearing the red dress she performed in. On 28 September, Raye performed a medley of "I Will Overcome" and "Where Is My Husband!" at the 2026 MTV Video Music Awards. On 22 October, Raye performed "I Hate The Way I Look Today" at the 2026 Mercury Prize ceremony.

=== Singles, promotional singles, and videos ===
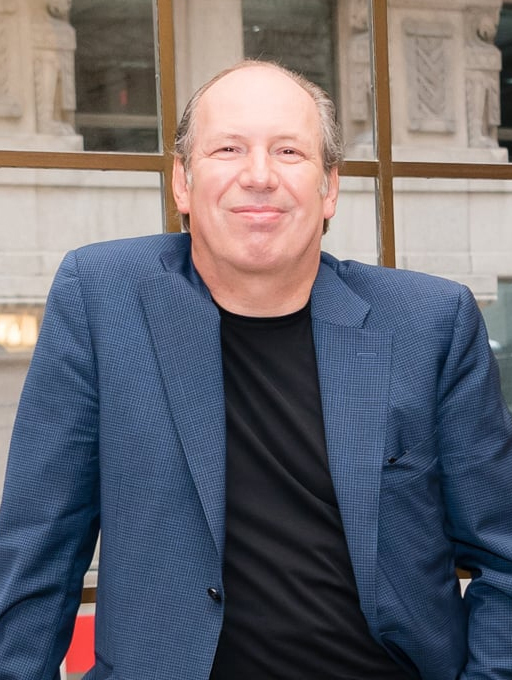
German film composer Hans Zimmer (pictured) co-produced "Click Clack Symphony" and is credited as a featured artist on the track.

On 19 September 2025, Raye released "Where Is My Husband!" as the lead single from This Music May Contain Hope, alongside its music video directed by The Reids. The song reached number one on the UK singles chart in January 2026, becoming Raye's second number one single in the country. Elsewhere, it reached number 11 on the US Billboard Hot 100, and number six on the Billboard Global 200. The song was nominated for Song of the Year at the 2026 Brit Awards, while the music video won the award for Video of the Year at the MOBO Awards 2026. On 14 November 2025, a remix of "Where Is My Husband!" by French DJ David Guetta and Italian producer Hypaton was released to streaming services.

On December 26, Raye released a live version of "I Know You're Hurting" as a B-side to "Where Is My Husband!", both performed at Montreux Jazz Festival, on 12-inch vinyl as the album's first promotional single. The vinyl was made available on Raye's official store, and a video of the live performance of "I Know You're Hurting" from the festival accompanied the release. "I Know You're Hurting" reached number 22 on the UK singles chart.

On 27 February, the album's second single "Nightingale Lane" was released. A video of a live performance with the Flames Collective and the London Symphony Orchestra at Abbey Road Studios in London, England accompanied the release. The song was issued on 7-inch vinyl with a B-side featuring the live performance at Abbey Road. "Nightingale Lane" reached number 20 on the UK singles chart.

On 20 March, the album's third single, "Click Clack Symphony", featuring German film composer Hans Zimmer, was released alongside a music video directed by Dave Meyers. It reached number 11 on the UK singles chart, and number 68 on the Billboard Global 200. On 7 September, "Joy", featuring Raye's sisters Amma and Absolutely, was released on 7-inch vinyl as the album's fourth single, with an accompanying music video.

== Critical reception ==
Professional ratings
Aggregate scores
Source	Rating
AnyDecentMusic?	8.4/10
Metacritic	86/100
Review scores
Source	Rating
Clash	8/10
The Daily Telegraph	4/5 stars
DIY	5/5 stars
The Guardian	3/5 stars
The Independent	5/5 stars
MusicOMH	4.5/5 stars
NME	5/5 stars
Pitchfork	6.9/10
Rolling Stone	4.5/5 stars
Slant Magazine	3.5/5 stars

According to the review aggregator Metacritic, This Music May Contain Hope received "universal acclaim" based on a weighted average score of 86 out of 100 from 15 critic scores. The review aggregator Any Decent Music gave the album a weighted average score of 8.4 out of 10 from 16 critic scores.

Critics praised the ambition and scale on This Music May Contain Hope. Andy Hill of Clash described Raye's ambition as "staggering" and noted her "fourth-wall-breaking familiarity", while referring to "Click Clack Symphony" as a "Beyoncé-level anthem". Ben Tipple of DIY similarly dubbed the album a "stunning showcase of her ever-growing confidence", observing that Raye traverses themes of "love, heartbreak, life, and death [sic]". Helen Brown of The Independent likened the album to an "epic Technicolor movie", highlighting Raye's "matey warmth" and calling the work a "pure audio spectacle". Puah Ziwei of NME agreed that while the album is "a lot to take in", its "unrestrained, all-in approach" makes the journey worthwhile, calling it an "extravagant theatre performance" grounded in relatable experiences.

Reviewers also praised the production, stylistic elements and vocals. Rob Sheffield of Rolling Stone dubbed the album a "lavish 73-minute narrative", and John Murphy of MusicOMH noted its "rare scale and energy", saying it feels designed to be revisited "time and time again". James Hall of The Daily Telegraph observed a wide range of influences and commended Raye's "extraordinary voice and quick-fire delivery", though he did note the project "occasionally slips into self indulgence". Steve Erickson of Slant Magazine wrote that the album "reaffirms Raye's refusal to be pigeonholed into any one genre", adding that even when lyrics verge on cliché, Raye is "refreshingly unconcerned with sounding corny". Boutayna Chokrane of Pitchfork emphasised the meticulous arrangements, "immaculate production value", and praised Raye's choice to be "inconvenient" in a "TikTok-driven" industry, highlighting anthemic moments like the brassy "Where Is My Husband!" and the six-minute centerpiece "I Know You're Hurting".

Alexis Petridis of The Guardian found the album to be "a lot" - overstuffed with ideas - and said it "wobbles unsteadily along the line that separates unbridled self-expression from self-indulgence". He criticised lengthy spoken-word interludes and dialogues on tracks like "Life Boat", but conceded that the album "pays off more often than it fails". Petridis concluded that in a risk-averse era, Raye's boldness stood out, stating "the climate of the 21st century has led artists to be risk-averse", but that is "not a label you could pin on Raye".

== Accolades ==
Awards and nominations for This Music May Contain Hope
Award	Year	Category	Result	Ref.
Grammy Awards	2027	Album of the Year	Pending	
Grammy Awards	2027	Best Pop Vocal Album	Pending	
Mercury Prize	2026	Album of the Year	Won	

== Commercial performance ==
In the United Kingdom, This Music May Contain Hope debuted at number one on the UK Albums Chart, becoming Raye's first album to do so. It opened with 46,976 album-equivalent units, consisting of 28,701 pure album sales, 2,723 downloads, and 15,552 sales-equivalent streams. Additionally, it debuted at number one on six other charts in the country; the Independent Albums Chart, the Album Sales Chart, the Album Downloads Chart, the Vinyl Albums Chart, the Albums Streaming Chart, and the Physical Albums Chart. In its second week on the UK Albums Chart, This Music May Contain Hope placed at number two, selling an additional 15,571 copies. In May 2026, the album was certified gold by the British Phonographic Industry (BPI) for total sales of over 100,000 copies. As of October 2026, the album has sold 152,141 copies in the United Kingdom.

In Scotland, This Music May Contain Hope debuted at number one on the Scottish Albums Chart. In Ireland, the album debuted at number two on the Irish Albums Chart, and at number one on the Irish Independent Albums Chart. In Germany, the album debuted at number three on the Offizielle Top 100 chart. In France, the album debuted at number six on the French Albums Chart, and in Spain the album reached number seven on the Spanish Albums Chart. In Australia, the album reached number six on the Australian Albums Chart, and number one on the Australian Hip Hop/R&B Albums chart. Additionally, This Music May Contain Hope reached number one on the charts in Flanders, the Netherlands, and Switzerland. In the United States, the album debuted at number eleven on the US Billboard 200, including number three on the Independent Albums chart.

== Track listing ==
All lyrics are written by Rachel Keen.

This Music May Contain Hope track listing
No.	Title	Music	Producer(s)	Length
1.	"Intro: Girl Under the Grey Cloud"	Rachel Keen; Chris Hill; Tom Richards	Raye; Hill; Richards	1:12
2.	"I Will Overcome"	R. Keen; Hill; Richards	Raye; Hill; Richards; Mike Sabath^{[c]}; Antoine Klein^{[a]}	4:55
3.	"Beware.. The South London Lover Boy"	R. Keen	Raye; Pete Clements^{[a]}	3:26
4.	"The WhatsApp Shakespeare"	R. Keen; Callum Au; Richards; Mike Sabath	Raye; Sabath; Hill^{[a]}; Richards^{[a]}	3:56
5.	"Winter Woman"	R. Keen; Hill; Richards; Toneworld	Raye; Sabath; Toneworld; Hill^{[a]}; Richards^{[a]}	4:23
6.	"Click Clack Symphony" (featuring Hans Zimmer)	R. Keen; Sabath; Hans Zimmer; Hendric Buenck; Russell Emanuel; Billie Ray	Raye; Zimmer; Sabath	5:03
7.	"I Know You're Hurting"	R. Keen; Graeme Blevins; Matt Brooks; Pete Clements; Augie Haas; Hill; Paul Murray; Richards; Jordan Riley; Oscar Steiler	Raye; Clements; Riley	6:18
8.	"Life Boat"	R. Keen; Punctual; Riley	Raye; Riley; Punctual	4:18
9.	"I Hate the Way I Look Today"	R. Keen; Haas; Hill; Murray; Richards; Ed Richardson; Steiler	Raye; Hill; Richards	3:30
10.	"Goodbye Henry" (featuring Al Green)	R. Keen; Blevins; Brooks; Haas; Hill; Murray; Richards; Steiler	Raye; Clements	5:22
11.	"Nightingale Lane"	R. Keen; Hill; Richards	Raye; Hill; Richards	5:02
12.	"Skin & Bones"	R. Keen; Clements; Sabath	Raye; Sabath	3:14
13.	"Where Is My Husband!"	R. Keen; Sabath	Raye; Sabath	3:16
14.	"Fields" (featuring Grandad Michael)	R. Keen; Daniella Bernard; Blevins; Michael Keen; Murray; Richards; Alex Robinson; Sabath; Liv Thompson	Raye; Sabath; Robinson	4:12
15.	"Joy" (featuring Amma and Absolutely)	R. Keen; Abby-Lynn Keen; Lauren Keen; Richards; Sabath	Raye; Richards; Sabath	4:25
16.	"Happier Times Ahead"	R. Keen; Blevins; Brooks; Clements; Hill; Richards; Tom Walsh; Joe Webb	Raye; Clements	4:31
17.	"Fin"	R. Keen; Hill; Richards	Raye; Hill; Richards	6:27
Total length:				73:30

=== Notes ===
- All tracks are stylised with a full stop at the end except "Where Is My Husband!", which is also stylised in all caps.
- ^{^[c]} Indicates a co-producer.
- ^{^[a]} Indicates an additional producer.

== Personnel ==
Credits were adapted from Tidal.

=== Musicians ===
- Rachel Keen – lead vocals
- Chris Hill – arrangement (tracks 1, 2, 4, 5, 8, 11, 17), bass guitar (2, 3, 9, 11, 13), double bass (4), synthesiser (7)
- Tom Richards – arrangement (1, 2, 4, 5, 11, 17), piano (2), background vocals (3, 9, 15), saxophone (3, 16), programming (4), glockenspiel (9), tenor saxophone (10), piano (11)
- The London Symphony Orchestra – instrumentation (1, 2, 5, 7, 11)
- James Maddren – drums (2, 11)
- Katy Hill – soprano (2)
- Trevor Mires – brass (3), trombone (4, 9, 10, 12, 15, 16)
- Paul Murray – electric guitar (3, 7, 10, 11, 14, 16), background vocals (3, 9)
- Matt Brooks – drums (3, 7, 10, 14, 16), background vocals (3, 9, 15)
- Graeme Blevins – saxophone (3, 9, 13, 15, 16), alto saxophone (10)
- Danielle Bernard – organ (3, 9, 16), background vocals (3, 14, 15), piano (7)
- Pete Clements – background vocals (3, 9, 15), bass guitar (7), synthesiser (10), arrangement (16)
- Dan Ellis – percussion (3, 9, 13), saxophone (16)
- Mike Sabath – background vocals (3, 9, 15), bass guitar (13)
- Liv Thompson – background vocals (3, 15), bass guitar (10, 14, 16)
- Aaron Emanuel – background vocals (3, 15)
- Jesse McGinty – trombone (3), arrangement (16)
- Ryan Quigley – trumpet (3)
- Dan Oates – violin (4, 8–10, 15, 16)
- Kirsty Mangan – violin (4, 8–10, 15, 16)
- Matthew Ward – violin (4, 8–10, 15, 16)
- Paloma Deike – violin (4, 8–10, 15, 16)
- Sam Kennedy – violin (4, 8–10, 15, 16)
- Emma Owens – viola (4, 8–10, 15, 16)
- Rachael Lander – cello (4, 8–10, 15, 16)
- Joe Webb – piano (4, 9, 12, 16), synthesiser (10)
- Callum Au – trombone (4, 9, 12, 15), instrumentation (7, 16)
- Tom Walsh – trumpet (4, 9, 10, 12, 15, 16)
- Andy Wood – trombone (4, 9, 12, 15)
- George Hogg – trumpet (4, 9, 12, 15)
- Mike Davis – trumpet (4, 9, 12, 15)
- Tom Dennis – trumpet (4, 9, 12, 15)
- Nichol Thomson – trombone (4, 9, 15)
- Ed Richardson – drums (4, 9)
- Hendric Buenck – arrangement (6)
- Russell Emanuel – arrangement (6)
- Charlie Paxson – cello (6)
- Roman Soto – percussion (6)
- Nashville Music Scoring Orchestra – instrumentation (6)
- Flames Collective – choir vocals (7, 11)
- Layla Ley – background vocals (7, 14)
- Patrice Copeland – background vocals (7, 14)
- Matthias Simmons – synthesiser (7)
- Kofi-William Osafo – spoken word (8)
- Howard McGill – saxophone (9, 12, 15)
- Jon Shenoy – saxophone (9, 12, 15)
- Mike Liserge – saxophone (9, 12, 15)
- Paul Booth – saxophone (9, 12, 15)
- Augie Haas – trumpet (9)
- Reverend Charles Hodges – organ (10)
- Tom Cawley – piano (11)
- Skin – saxophone (12)
- Distant Cowboy – cello (13)
- Grandma – spoken word (1, 13)
- Ivan Malespin – trombone (13)
- Aaron Janik – trumpet (13)
- Mike Cordone – trumpet (13)
- Yasmeen Al-Mazeedi – violin (13)
- Rita Andrade – violin (13)
- Abby-Lynn Keen – lead vocals (15)
- Lauren Keen – lead vocals (15)
- Richard Phillips – cello (16)

=== Technical ===
- Alex Robinson – engineering
- Andrew Dudman – engineering (1, 2, 5, 7, 11, 17), mixing (1, 17)
- Chris Parker – engineering (1, 2, 5, 7, 11, 17)
- Mat Bartram – engineering (4, 9)
- Nick Spezia – engineering (6)
- Clay Jones – engineering (10)
- Liam Nolan – vocal engineering (15)
- Noah Urrea – vocal engineering (15)
- Joe Brice – additional engineering (4, 9, 10, 16), second engineering (3, 4, 9, 10), engineering assistance (11, 12, 15, 16)
- Paul Norris – additional engineering (4, 9, 15)
- Harpaal Sanghera – additional engineering (12), second engineering (3, 12, 14)
- Neil Dawes – second engineering (1, 2, 11, 17)
- Charlie Howe – engineering assistance (1, 2, 5, 7, 11, 17)
- Jules Bonnet – engineering assistance (2, 5, 6)
- Mollie Crammond – engineering assistance (2–4, 6, 7, 9–16)
- Sanjana Walia – engineering assistance (3, 4, 8–12, 14–16)
- Cecilia Griffin – engineering assistance (4, 7, 9–11, 13)
- Matis Herbouze – engineering assistance (5, 6)
- Paulin Guiraudon – engineering assistance (5, 6)
- Soledad Poussielgues Melia – engineering assistance (5)
- Scott McEwen – engineering assistance (10)
- Alex Pyle – engineering assistance (13)
- Isaac Allan – engineering assistance (13)
- Jon Castelli – mixing (2, 4–8)
- Tony Maserati – mixing (3, 10–16)
- Alan Meyerson – mixing (6)
- Chris Hill – mixing (9)
- Tom Richards – mixing (9)
- Mike Hillier – mastering (1–12, 14–17)
- Dale Becker – mastering (13)
- Raimund Bretterbauer - engineering

== Charts ==
Chart performance
Chart (2026)	Peak position
Australian Albums (ARIA)	6
Australian Hip Hop/R&B Albums (ARIA)	1
Austrian Albums (Ö3 Austria)	2
Belgian Albums (Ultratop Flanders)	1
Belgian Albums (Ultratop Wallonia)	3
Canadian Albums (Billboard)	10
Croatian International Albums (HDU)	4
Czech Albums (ČNS IFPI)	8
Danish Albums (Hitlisten)	5
Dutch Albums (Album Top 100)	1
Finnish Albums (Suomen virallinen lista)	9
French Albums (SNEP)	6
German Albums (Offizielle Top 100)	3
German Pop Albums (Offizielle Top 100)	3
Hungarian Albums (MAHASZ)	13
Irish Albums (Official Charts)	2
Irish Independent Albums (IRMA)	1
Italian Albums (FIMI)	12
Japanese Physical Albums (Oricon)	152
Lithuanian Albums (AGATA)	12
New Zealand Albums (RMNZ)	4
Norwegian Albums (IFPI Norge)	2
Polish Albums (ZPAV)	3
Portuguese Albums (AFP)	5
Scottish Albums (Official Charts)	1
Slovak Albums (ČNS IFPI)	7
Spanish Albums (Promusicae)	7
Swedish Albums (Sverigetopplistan)	8
Swiss Albums (Schweizer Hitparade)	1
UK Albums (Official Charts)	1
UK Independent Albums (Official Charts)	1
US Billboard 200	11
US Independent Albums (Billboard)	3

== Certifications ==
Certifications for This Music May Contain Hope
Region	Certification	Certified units/sales
Canada (Music Canada)	Gold	40,000^{‡}
New Zealand (RMNZ)	Gold	7,500^{‡}
United Kingdom (BPI)	Gold	100,000^{‡}
^{‡} Sales+streaming figures based on certification alone.

== See also ==
- List of UK Albums Chart number ones of the 2020s
