= Home for My Heart =

Single by ArrDee and Cat Burns
- Released: 9 March 2023
- Length: 2:38
- Label: Island; Universal
- Songwriters: ArrDee; Cat Burns; Jake Gosling; Kwame Kwei-Armah; Lauren Keen; Matthew Brettle; WhyJay; AOD
- Producers: Jake Gosling; LiTek; WhyJay; AOD

ArrDee singles chronology
"Loser" (2023)	"Home for My Heart" (2023)	"One Direction" (2023)

Cat Burns singles chronology
"Sleep at Night" (2022)	"Home for My Heart" (2023)	"Live More & Love More" (2023)

"Home for My Heart" is a song by British rapper ArrDee and British singer-songwriter Cat Burns. It was released as a single on 9 March 2023, through Island and Universal.

== Background ==
"Home for My Heart" was written by ArrDee, Cat Burns, Jake Gosling, Lauren Keen, Matthew Brettle, WhyJay, AOD and actor and writer Kwame Kwei-Armah; production was by Gosling, LiTek, WhyJay and AOD.

== Release ==
On 9 March 2023, ArrDee and Cat Burns released "Home For My Heart", which saw the former adopting a different sound to what he has released previously.

== Music video ==
The official music video, directed by Najeeb Tarazi, was released the same day.

== Chart performance ==
After three days of release, the Official Charts Company predicted "Home for my Heart" would debut at number 36 on the UK Singles Top 100. "Home for my Heart" debuted at number 35 on the UK singles chart on 17 March 2023. It debuted at number 83 on the Irish singles chart. and number 23 on the Official New Zealand Music Chart.

== Track listings ==
1. Home for My Heart – 2:38
2. Home for My Heart (Vibe Chemistry Remix) – 2:17
3. Home for My Heart (TeeDee Remix) - 2:24
4. Home for My Heart (WhyTek Remix) - 2:24
5. Home for My Heart (Piano version) - 2:46

== Charts ==
Chart performance for "Home for My Heart"
Chart (2023)	Peak position
Ireland (IRMA)	83
New Zealand Hot Singles (RMNZ)	23
UK Singles (Official Charts)	35
