= Life Boat (song) =

2026 song by Raye

Song by Raye

from the album This Music May Contain Hope
- Released: March 27, 2026
- Genre: Electropop
- Length: 4:18
- Label: Human Re Sources
- Songwriters: Rachel Keen; William Lansley; John Morgan; Jordan Riley
- Producers: Punctual; Raye; Jordan Riley

"Life Boat" is a song by British singer-songwriter Raye which appears on her second studio album This Music May Contain Hope. Raye wrote and produced the track with Punctual and Jordan Riley. An electropop song with a spoken word intro, "Life Boat" explores themes of perseverance and resilience in spite of hardship. A sonic departure from the jazz and R&B of the rest of the album, "Life Boat" was well-received by critics and was nominated for the Grammy Award for Best Dance Pop Recording at the 69th Annual Grammy Awards.

== Background ==
In 2025, Raye began teasing her second studio album on social media, including a post shared to her Instagram in October where she mentioned that she was "writing a lot" and that she "can't wait to show [her fans] this new music". During a September 2025 interview with the BBC, Raye explained that she planned to put out an album "in the first half of next year", but that she still needed to finish it. On 19 September 2025, Raye made the album available for pre-order and gave a 2026 release date. On 22 January 2026, she announced that the album, titled This Music May Contain Hope, would be released on 27 March, through Human Re Sources. "Life Boat" is included as track eight on the album and was released alongside the rest of the album on 27 March 2026. On vinyl editions of the album, the tracks are split into four seasons, with "Life Boat" featuring in the winter section.

== Composition ==
"Life Boat" is an electropop song featuring "distorted vocals, spoken interludes and dance-driven production into a collage of resilience", with Raye urging listeners not to give up in the face of adversity and motivating them to keep moving forward. Although a sonic departure from the rest of the album, which is predominantly influenced by jazz, orchestral pop, blues, big band, and soul, "Life Boat" lyrically reflects the album's themes of hope and the complexities of human emotion. Discussing this with Zane Lowe, Raye explained that she "expressed and explored any genre [she] wanted to" when making the album.

Discussing the song in a TikTok video, Raye explained that "words are powerful, and I just want anyone who is thinking anything negative to think 'I'm not giving up yet' and that's what this song is for and about". "Life Boat" begins with the voices of Raye's family members and various other people encouraging her to persevere and themselves resolving not to give up in spite of challenges, including her maternal grandfather, who passed away shortly after recording his voice message and who appears alongside Raye on the cover of her 2024 Live at Montreux Jazz Festival album.

== Charts ==
Chart performance for "Life Boat"
Chart (2026)	Peak position
Ireland (IRMA)	72
UK Independent (Official Charts)	15
