= I Know You're Hurting =

- Cover art of "Where Is My Husband! / I Know You're Hurting - Live at Montreux" 12-inch vinyl

Promotional single by Raye

from the album This Music May Contain Hope.
- Released: 26 December 2025 (live at Montreux); 27 March 2026 (original)
- Genre: Pop; arena rock; soul
- Length: 6:17
- Label: Human Re Sources
- Songwriters: Raye; Pete Clements; Matt Brooks; Jordan Riley; Tom Richards; Paul Murray; Chris Hill; Graeme Blevins; Augie Haas; Oscar Stieler
- Producers: Raye; Pete Clements; Jordan Riley

Licensed audio
- "I Know You're Hurting" on YouTube

"I Know You're Hurting" (Note: Stylised as "I Know You're Hurting." (with a full stop).) is a song recorded by British singer-songwriter Raye from her second studio album This Music May Contain Hope. (2026). Raye co-wrote and co-produced the track with Pete Clements and Jordan Riley, with additional writing from Matt Brooks, Tom Richards, Paul Murray, Chris Hill, Graeme Blevins, Augie Haas, and Oscar Stieler. "I Know You're Hurting" is a ballad that features elements of arena rock and soul. Lyrically, it is about reaching out to someone who is struggling and offering them a helping hand.

The song debuted at number 22 on the UK singles chart following the release of This Music May Contain Hope. Raye performed "I Know You're Hurting" during multiple festival and concert appearances in 2025, including at the Glastonbury Festival in June, which marked her live debut of the song.

== Background and release ==
"I Know You're Hurting" was one of the first songs that Raye recorded for This Music May Contain Hope. In an interview with Zane Lowe for Apple Music in March 2026, she revealed that the song was initially recorded and conceptualised during a trip she took for her 26th birthday in October 2023. During the trip, she had a conversation with her band about mental health, specifically in men, after which she "got on a piano and said a little prayer" asking for a song to tell the conversation "really beautifully". The result was the band recording the song in live time, and ending up with a twelve-minute demo. Later, Raye decided to address the song as a "letter" to her friend, who was experiencing a difficult time, and hoped that the song would allow people to "grieve and feel and hopefully come out the other side".

The song is included as track seven on Raye's second studio album, This Music May Contain Hope, which was released on 27 March 2026. Prior to the song's standard release, a live version of the track performed at the Montreux Jazz Festival was released as a B-side to "Where Is My Husband! - Live at Montreux" on 12-inch vinyl through Raye's official store, on 26 December 2025. On 29 March 2026, a live performance of "I Know You're Hurting" at Abbey Road Studios in London was released to YouTube.

== Live performances ==
Raye performed "I Know You're Hurting" at multiple concerts and festivals before the song's official release, including at the Glastonbury Festival 2025, the Lowlands Festival 2025, the All Points East Festival 2025, the Montreux Jazz Festival 2025, the Newport Jazz Festival 2025, and at the 2025 Capital Jingle Bell Ball. She has performed the song as part of the setlist for her concert tour, This Tour May Contain New Music (2026), beginning with the tour's first stop in Łódź, Poland, on 22 January 2026.

== Commercial performance ==
In the United Kingdom, the song debuted at number 22 on the UK singles chart following the release of This Music May Contain Hope, becoming the fourth top forty entry from the album in the country.

== Charts ==
Chart performance for "I Know You're Hurting"
Chart (2026)	Peak position
Global Excl. US (Billboard)	179
Ireland (IRMA)	53
Netherlands (Single Top 100)	55
New Zealand Hot Singles (RMNZ)	4
Norway (IFPI Norge)	96
Portugal (AFP)	125
Sweden Heatseeker (Sverigetopplistan)	1
Switzerland (Schweizer Hitparade)	40
UK Singles (Official Charts)	22
UK Indie (Official Charts)	4

== Release history ==
List of release dates and formats
Region	Date	Format(s)	Version(s)	Label	Ref.
Various	26 December 2025	12-inch vinyl (B-side to "Where Is My Husband! - Live at Montreux")	Live at Montreux	Human Re Sources	
Various	27 March 2026	Digital download; streaming	Original	Human Re Sources	
