= Amma (musician) =

British singer, songwriter, producer

- Amma at her second headline show at the Courtyard Theatre
- Born: Lauren Amma Keen; 3 November 2001 (age 25); Tooting, London, England
- Occupations: Singer-songwriter; producer
- Years active: 2022–present
- Relatives: Raye (sister); Absolutely (sister)
- Musical career
- Genres: R&B; pop; EDM
- Instrument: Vocals
- Labels: Stellar Songs; The Orchard
- Website: worldofamma.com

Lauren Amma Keen (born 3 November 2001), known professionally as Amma, is a British singer-songwriter. She is currently signed to Stellar Songs Publishing. Keen is known for her writing contributions to "Home for My Heart" by friends ArrDee and Cat Burns, songs on projects from FLO, JoJo, and NAO, as well as her 2026 debut album Middle Child.

== Career ==
=== Early life ===
Hailing from Tooting in South London, Keen was born to a Swiss-Ghanaian mother and a British father, musician/producer Paul Keen. Keen was born into a musical family and began making music after watching her father use audio production software Logic Pro. Her oldest sister, Rachel, has charted internationally under the pop alias Raye, and her younger sister, Abby-Lynn, is also a singer-songwriter known as Absolutely.

=== EPs, songwriting, and Middle Child ===
In 2023, Keen received her first UK top 40 single as a songwriter with "Home for My Heart," co-written with her friend Cat Burns. She subsequently contributed to projects by artists including FLO, IVE, JoJo, Nao and Sam Feldt. Her songwriting credits include "Lips" by IVE, "Shoulda Woulda Coulda", "Therapy At The Club", and "I'm Just a Girl" by FLO, and "Ready to Love" by JoJo.

In August 2025, Keen released her debut EP, Middle Child, followed by the EP Blame Game in December of the same year. Both releases preceded her debut full-length project, which expanded on material introduced in the earlier releases.

On 15 April 2026, Keen released her ten-track debut project, Middle Child, through The Orchard. The project featured collaborations with producers including Bongo By The Way, Joel Malka and Gustav Landell, and included songs such as "If You Don't Love Me", "Blame Game" and "If Not You, Who?".

=== Live performances and recognition ===
Keen made her live debut in 2025 as a supporting act for her sister Raye. She subsequently performed at All Points East and Capital's Jingle Bell Ball. In 2026, she continued performing alongside Raye, including on her international tour, and appeared at Leeds Festival. She also featured on Raye's song "Joy.", alongside her sister Absolutely, from Raye's 2026 album This Music May Contain Hope.

In October 2026, Keen performed her first headline shows at the Courtyard Theatre in London. In November 2026, she joined Skye Newman as a supporting act on The Survival Tour and released the single "Baby Blues".

On 12 November 2026, Amazon Music announced Keen as one of three inaugural participants in its Breakthrough Songwriters programme, alongside Tre Jean-Marie and Carrie K. The programme recognises and supports songwriters through development funding, workshops and professional opportunities.

== Discography ==
=== Studio albums ===
Middle Child	Released: 15 April 2026; Label: The Orchard; Format: CD, digital download, streaming

=== Extended plays ===
Title	Details
Middle Child EP	Released: 22 August 2025; Label: The Orchard; Format: Digital download, streaming
Blame Game	Released: 5 December 2025; Label: The Orchard; Format: Digital download, streaming

=== Guest appearances ===
Title	Year	Artist	Album
"Good Times" (featuring Mahalia) (spoken word)	2022	Miraa May	Tales of a Miracle (Deluxe)
"Joy" (featuring Amma & Absolutely)	2026	Raye	This Music May Contain Hope

=== Selected songwriting credits ===
Title	Year	Artist	Album
"Lips"	2023	Ive	I've Ive
"Home for My Heart"	2023	ArrDee & Cat Burns	Non-album single
"Shoulda Woulda Coulda"	2024	Flo	Access All Areas
"I'm Just A Girl"	2024	Flo	Access All Areas
"Ready To Love"	2025	JoJo	NGL
"Poolside"	2025	Nao	Jupiter
"Happy People"	2025	Nao	Jupiter
"Therapy at the Club"	2026	Flo	Therapy at the Club
"I Can't Be High Around You Anymore"	2026	Flo	Therapy at the Club

== Tours ==
Supporting

- Raye – This Tour May Contain New Music (2026)
- Skye Newman – The Survival Tour (2026)

== Awards and recognition ==
Year	Organisation	Recognition	Result	Ref
2026	Amazon Music	Breakthrough Songwriter Award	Won	
