= Where Is My Husband! =

2025 single by Raye

Single by Raye

from the album This Music May Contain Hope.
- Written: February 2025 (Note: During the And the Writer Is... podcast, Raye said that she wrote "Where Is My Husband!" with Mike Sabath "just after [2025] Grammys".)
- Released: 19 September 2025
- Genre: R&B; soul; pop; big band; gospel
- Length: 3:16
- Label: Human Re Sources
- Songwriters: Raye; Mike Sabath
- Producers: Raye; Mike Sabath

Raye singles chronology
"Suzanne" (2025)	"Where Is My Husband!" (2025)	"Nightingale Lane" (2026)

Music video
- "Where Is My Husband!" on YouTube

"Where Is My Husband!" (stylised capitalised) is a song by the British singer-songwriter Raye. She wrote and co-produced it with her frequent collaborator Mike Sabath. After performing it at several festival appearances, Raye released the song through Human Re Sources on 19 September 2025, as the lead single from her second studio album, This Music May Contain Hope. (2026).

The release of "Where Is My Husband!" was accompanied by a music video, which sees Raye trying to reach a mysterious man. Commercially, the song was a success, peaking at number one in the United Kingdom, becoming Raye's second number one single in her home country, and charting within the top 10 in several countries including Australia, Austria, Canada, Germany, Greece, Iceland, Ireland, the Netherlands, New Zealand, Norway, Sweden and Switzerland. It also became Raye's highest-charting single in the United States, peaking at number 11 on the Billboard Hot 100.

At the 69th Annual Grammy Awards, "Where Is My Husband!" received three nominations, including Record of the Year and Song of the Year, with a further nomination for its David Guetta and Hypaton remix.

== Release and promotion ==
Raye performed "Where Is My Husband!" on 28 June 2025 at the Glastonbury Festival, as the opening number of her set on the Pyramid Stage. NME's writer Surej Singh said it was a "massive tune" and noted that the singer was accompanied by a brass band. She later performed it at other festivals, including All Points East in England and Montreux Jazz Festival in Switzerland. Additionally, Raye teased the song on the video-sharing app TikTok on which a snippet of the bridge went viral.

"Where Is My Husband!" was released on 19 September 2025 through Human Re Sources. The release of "Where Is My Husband!" was accompanied by a music video, directed by The Reids. It begins as a black-and-white video and later incorporates colour when Raye appears on stage wearing a red dress. The singer is later seen trying to reach the shadow of a man, without achieving it. It was billed as the lead single from Raye's second studio album, which was made available to pre-order the same date and released in 2026. In parallel to the single's release, the singer announced a concert tour titled This Tour May Contain New Music, which is scheduled to pass through Europe and North America in 2026.

Raye performed the song on Today as part of the Citi Concerts series and later on The Tonight Show Starring Jimmy Fallon, also performing the song on The Graham Norton Show and The Jennifer Hudson Show. A remix of "Where Is My Husband!" by French DJ David Guetta and Italian DJ Hypaton was released on 14 November 2025.

== Composition ==
Raye wrote and co-produced "Where Is My Husband!" alongside her frequent collaborator Mike Sabath. Writing for Rolling Stone, David Browne categorised the song as a mix of old and new R&B, highlighting its use of horns and hip-hop sounds. Paolo Ragusa from Consequence described it as a pop track with a retro style, while Shahzaib Hussain from Clash interpreted it as a "brassy" R&B and soul song with elements of 1960s girl group music.

The lyrics of "Where Is My Husband!" follow Raye searching for a lifelong partner and referencing an engagement ring. Throughout the song, she imagines how her life with him would be in the future: "Wait til I get my hands on him/I'ma tell him off too/For how long he kept me waiting". She later realises that "she must find herself if she wants love to find her", according to Ragusa. Discussing the single's theme in an interview with British Vogue, Raye shared: "My last devastating break-up was four, five years ago. I was like, 'I'm gonna marry him.' We [were] together for two years and it ended up not working out. I have never experienced a more crippling emotion. It took me three, four years to get over him. Like, I can't allow myself to fall in love again until it's safe."

== Commercial performance ==
In the United Kingdom, "Where Is My Husband!" debuted at number four on the UK Singles Chart for the chart week dated 26 September 2025. The song rose to number three the following week, before dropping three places to number six in its third week. In its sixth week on the chart, the track rebounded to its then peak of number three, where it remained for the next four weeks, ultimately rising to number two for the chart week dated 28 November 2025. The song was kept off the top spot by Taylor Swift's "The Fate of Ophelia" (2025) for the next three weeks. For the chart week dated 2 January 2026, "Where Is My Husband!" rose to number one on the UK Singles Chart, becoming Raye's second number one single in the country, after "Escapism" (2022), and the first number one song in the United Kingdom of 2026. Elsewhere, "Where Is My Husband!" debuted at number 90 on the US Billboard Hot 100 for the chart week dated 11 October 2025. In its fourteenth week on the chart, the song rose to number 13, becoming Raye's first top twenty entry in the country. On the Billboard Global 200, "Where Is My Husband!" peaked at number six, surpassing "Escapism" as Raye's highest entry on the chart.

Outside of the UK, "Where Is My Husband!" reached the top ten in several nations' singles charts, including Germany, Switzerland, Belgium, Norway and Denmark, as well as top twenty in France, Slovakia and Portugal. In Austria, the single debuted at the end of September 2025 at number 23, becoming Raye's first top 40 entry there. A month later, the track rose to number 9, becoming her fourth top ten in the Austrian Singles Charts, and topped it several months later, becoming her second number one following her 2023 single "Prada" with Cassö.

== Track listing ==
Digital single

1. "Where Is My Husband!" – 3:16

7" single

1. "Where Is My Husband!" – 3:16
2. "Where Is My Husband!" (instrumental) – 3:16

12" single

1. "Where Is My Husband!" (live – at Montreux Jazz Festival)
2. "I Know You're Hurting" (live – at Montreux Jazz Festival)

== Accolades ==
List of award nomination received by "Where Is My Husband!"
Award	Year	Category	Result	Ref.
2026	American Music Awards	Best Vocal Performance	Nominated	
2026	Brit Awards	Song of the Year	Nominated	
2026	Grammy Awards	Record of the Year	Pending	
2026	Grammy Awards	Song of the Year	Pending	
2026	Grammy Awards	Pop Solo Performance	Pending	
2026	Grammy Awards	Best Remixed Recording (David Guetta and Hypaton remix)	Pending	
2026	iHeartRadio Music Awards	Best Lyrics	Nominated	
2026	MOBO Awards	Song of the Year	Nominated	
2026	MOBO Awards	Video of the Year	Won	
2026	MTV Video Music Awards	Song of the Year	Nominated	

=== Critics' Year-end lists ===
Year-end lists
Publication	List	Rank	Ref.
Consequence	The 200 Best Songs of 2025	129	
DIY	DIY's 2025 Tracks of the Year	17	
The Guardian	The 20 Best Songs of 2025	17	
The Independent	The Independent's Favourite Songs of 2025	—N/a	
NME	The 50 Best Songs of 2025	18	
Rough Trade	The Best Songs of 2025	—N/a	
Variety	The Best Songs of 2025	—N/a	

== Charts ==
=== Weekly charts ===
Weekly chart performance for "Where Is My Husband!"
Chart (2025–2026)	Peak position
Argentina Anglo Airplay (Monitor Latino)	8
Australia (ARIA)	3
Australia Hip Hop/R&B (ARIA)	1
Austria (Ö3 Austria Top 40)	1
Austria Airplay (MusicTrace)	1
Belarus Airplay (TopHit)	7
Belgium (Ultratop 50 Flanders)	4
Belgium (Ultratop 50 Wallonia)	2
Bolivia Anglo Airplay (Monitor Latino)	4
Bulgaria Airplay (PROPHON)	1
Canada Hot 100 (Billboard)	5
Canada AC (Billboard)	2
Canada CHR/Top 40 (Billboard)	2
Canada Hot AC (Billboard)	4
Canada Modern Rock (Billboard)	37
Central America Anglo Airplay (Monitor Latino)	11
Chile Anglo Airplay (Monitor Latino)	5
Colombia Anglo Airplay (Monitor Latino)	4
CIS Airplay (TopHit)	1
CIS Airplay (TopHit) Remix with David Guetta and Hypaton	93
Costa Rica Anglo Airplay (Monitor Latino)	10
Croatia International Airplay (Top lista)	1
Czech Republic Airplay (ČNS IFPI)	69
Czech Republic Singles Digital (ČNS IFPI)	5
Denmark (Tracklisten)	10
Dominican Republic Anglo Airplay (Monitor Latino)	3
Ecuador Anglo Airplay (Monitor Latino)	7
Estonia Airplay (TopHit)	2
Finland (Suomen virallinen lista)	25
Finland Airplay (Radiosoittolista)	15
France (SNEP)	14
Germany (GfK)	2
Global 200 (Billboard)	6
Greece International (IFPI)	3
Guatemala Anglo Airplay (Monitor Latino)	7
Honduras Anglo Airplay (Monitor Latino)	5
Hungary (Rádiós Top 40)	23
Hungary (Single Top 40)	21
Iceland (Tónlistinn)	3
Ireland (IRMA)	2
Israel (Mako Hitlist)	28
Italy (FIMI)	36
Japan Hot Overseas (Billboard Japan)	8
Kazakhstan Airplay (TopHit)	5
Latin America Anglo Airplay (Monitor Latino)	2
Latvia Airplay (LaIPA)	1
Latvia Airplay (TopHit) Remix with David Guetta and Hypaton	5
Latvia Streaming (LaIPA)	7
Lithuania (AGATA)	8
Lithuania Airplay (TopHit)	2
Lithuania Airplay (TopHit) Remix with David Guetta and Hypaton	55
Luxembourg (Billboard)	4
Malta Airplay (Radiomonitor)	1
Mexico Anglo Airplay (Monitor Latino)	11
Moldova Airplay (TopHit)	84
Netherlands (Dutch Top 40)	3
Netherlands (Single Top 100)	3
New Zealand (Recorded Music NZ)	6
Nicaragua Anglo Airplay (Monitor Latino)	3
Nigeria (TurnTable Top 100)	51
Nigeria Airplay (TurnTable)	20
North Macedonia Airplay (Radiomonitor)	2
Norway (IFPI Norge)	4
Panama Anglo Airplay (Monitor Latino)	9
Panama Streaming (PRODUCE)	117
Paraguay Anglo Airplay (Monitor Latino)	4
Peru Anglo Airplay (Monitor Latino)	10
Philippines Hot 100 (Billboard Philippines)	31
Poland (Polish Airplay Top 100)	5
Poland (Polish Streaming Top 100)	15
Portugal (AFP)	12
Puerto Rico Anglo Airplay (Monitor Latino)	2
Romania Airplay (TopHit)	54
Russia Airplay (TopHit)	2
Russia Airplay (TopHit) Remix with David Guetta and Hypaton	67
Serbia Airplay (Radiomonitor)	1
Singapore (RIAS)	13
Slovakia Airplay (ČNS IFPI)	3
Slovakia Singles Digital (ČNS IFPI)	8
Slovenia Airplay (Radiomonitor)	1
South Africa Airplay (TOSAC)	4
Spain (Promusicae)	25
Suriname (Nationale Top 40)	10
Sweden (Sverigetopplistan)	6
Switzerland (Schweizer Hitparade)	2
Turkey International Airplay (Radiomonitor Türkiye)	2
Ukraine Airplay (TopHit)	12
United Arab Emirates (IFPI)	12
UK Singles (Official Charts)	1
UK Independent (Official Charts)	1
Uruguay Anglo Airplay (Monitor Latino)	8
US Billboard Hot 100	11
US Adult Contemporary (Billboard)	17
US Adult Pop Airplay (Billboard)	6
US Pop Airplay (Billboard)	4
US Rhythmic Airplay (Billboard)	16
Venezuela Airplay (Record Report)	31

=== Monthly charts ===
Monthly chart performance for "Where Is My Husband!"
Chart (2025–2026)	Peak position
Belarus Airplay (TopHit)	8
CIS Airplay (TopHit)	2
Estonia Airplay (TopHit)	2
Kazakhstan Airplay (TopHit)	6
Latvia Airplay (TopHit) Remix with David Guetta and Hypaton	4
Lithuania Airplay (TopHit)	2
Moldova Airplay (TopHit)	99
Paraguay Airplay (SGP)	37
Romania Airplay (TopHit)	58
Russia Airplay (TopHit)	9
Russia Airplay (TopHit) Remix with David Guetta and Hypaton	73
Ukraine Airplay (TopHit)	12

=== Year-end charts ===
Year-end chart performance for "Where Is My Husband!"
Chart (2025)	Position
Austria (Ö3 Austria Top 40)	66
Belgium (Ultratop 50 Flanders)	110
Belgium (Ultratop 50 Wallonia)	150
CIS Airplay (TopHit)	152
Estonia Airplay (TopHit)	46
Netherlands (Dutch Top 40)	37
Lithuania Airplay (TopHit)	68
Netherlands (Single Top 100)	72
Switzerland (Schweizer Hitparade)	71
UK Singles (OCC)	47

== Certifications ==
Certifications for "Where Is My Husband!"
Region	Certification	Certified units/sales
Australia (ARIA)	4× Platinum	280,000^{‡}
Belgium (BRMA)	2× Platinum	80,000^{‡}
Brazil (Pro-Música Brasil)	Diamond	160,000^{‡}
Canada (Music Canada)	3× Platinum	240,000^{‡}
Denmark (IFPI Danmark)	Platinum	90,000^{‡}
France (SNEP)	Diamond	333,333^{‡}
Italy (FIMI)	Gold	100,000^{‡}
New Zealand (RMNZ)	3× Platinum	90,000^{‡}
Norway (IFPI Norway)	2× Platinum	120,000^{‡}
Poland (ZPAV)	Platinum	125,000^{‡}
Portugal (AFP)	2× Platinum	50,000^{‡}
Spain (Promusicae)	Platinum	100,000^{‡}
United Kingdom (BPI)	3× Platinum	1,800,000^{‡}
United States (RIAA)	2× Platinum	2,000,000^{‡}
Streaming
Czech Republic (ČNS IFPI)	Platinum	5,000,000^{†}
Greece (IFPI Greece)	Platinum	2,000,000^{†}
Slovakia (ČNS IFPI)	Platinum	1,700,000^{†}
Sweden (GLF)	Gold	6,000,000^{†}
^{‡} Sales+streaming figures based on certification alone.^{†} Streaming-only figures based on certification alone.

== Release history ==
Release dates and formats for "Where Is My Husband!"
Region	Date	Format(s)	Version(s)	Label(s)	Ref.
Various	19 September 2025	7-inch single; digital download; streaming	Original	Human Re Sources	
Italy	19 September 2025	Radio airplay	Original	Human Re Sources	
United States	7 October 2025	Contemporary hit radio	Original	Human Re Sources; The Orchard	
Various	14 November 2025	Digital download; streaming	David Guetta and Hypaton remixes	Human Re Sources	
Various	26 December 2025	12-inch single	Live	Human Re Sources	
United States	3 February 2026	Rhythmic contemporary radio	Original	Human Re Sources; The Orchard	

== See also ==
- List of UK singles chart number ones of the 2020s
- List of UK Independent Singles Chart number ones of 2025
- List of UK top-ten singles in 2025
