= Paracosm (Absolutely album) =

Studio album by Absolutely
- Released: 20 February 2026
- Length: 41:07
- Label: Epic
- Producers: Absolutely; Danja; Dave Hamelin; Deputy; Jahaan Sweet; Johan Lenox; Justus West; M-Phazes

Absolutely chronology
Cerebrum (2023)	Paracosm (2026)

Singles from Paracosm
- 1. "Goodbye Glitter" Released: 13 June 2025; 2. "I Just Don't Know You Yet" Released: 27 June 2025; 3. "No Audience" Released: 21 November 2025; 4. "Paracosm" Released: 17 February 2026

Professional ratings
Review scores
Source	Rating
DIY	4/5 stars
Shatter the Standards	4/5 stars

Paracosm is the second studio album by British singer-songwriter Absolutely. It was released on 20 February 2026, through Epic Records.

== Album information ==
On 18 September, it was announced on social media that Absolutely would be promoting the album while supporting her sister Raye on her concert tour, beginning in January 2026.

== Track listing ==
Track listing
No.	Title	Writer(s)	Producer(s)	Length
1.	"Natural Disaster"	Abby-Lynn Keen; Danja	Danja; Justus West	3:22
2.	"Nowhere to Hide"	Keen; Deputy	Deputy	3:38
3.	"Painting by Numbers"	Keen; Jahaan Sweet	Keen; Jahaan Sweet	3:41
4.	"Helium"	Keen; M-Phazes	M-Phazes; Keen	3:11
5.	"Simple Things"	Keen; Nate Campany; Delacey	Keen	3:20
6.	"No Audience"	Keen; Delacey; Danja	Danja	2:48
7.	"Prototype"	Keen; Deputy	Deputy	2:26
8.	"No Furniture"	Keen; Deputy	Deputy	2:54
9.	"Elevator"	Keen; Livvi Franc	Dave Hamelin; Keen	3:30
10.	"Trojan Horse"	Keen; M-Phazes	Keen; M-Phazes	1:42
11.	"Paracosm"	Paul Keen; Keen	Johan Lenox; Keen	3:23
12.	"I Just Don't Know You Yet"	Keen	Dave Hamelin	3:19
13.	"Goodbye Glitter"	Keen; Paul Keen; Danja	Danja	3:53
Total length:				41:07

== Personnel ==
- Absolutely – vocals
- Dave Hamelin – bass, drums, guitar, keyboards, synthesizer
- Johan Lenox – strings, piano, backing vocals
- Deputy – bass, keyboards
- Danny T. Levin – trombone, trumpet
- John Anderson – bass
- Virginia Figueiredo – clarinet
- Gina Luciani – flute
- Josh Landau – guitar
- Justus West – guitar
- Nate Campany – guitar
- Gracie Sprout – harp
- Jack Rochon – organ
- M-Phazes – piano
- Pascal Pahl – piano
- Ted Case – piano
- Chris Panameno – saxophone

== Charts ==
Chart performance for Paracosm
Chart (2026)	Peak position
Scottish Albums (Official Charts)	71
UK Albums Sales (OCC)	39
