= Acapulco (song) =

2021 single by Jason Derulo

Single by Jason Derulo
- Released: September 3, 2021
- Length: 2:19
- Label: Atlantic
- Songwriters: Jason Desrouleaux; Madison Love; Alex Oriet; David Phelan; John Morgan; Will Lansley; Henry Tucker
- Producers: Punctual; Saltwives

Jason Derulo singles chronology
"Jalebi Baby" (2021)	"Acapulco" (2021)	"Slidin'" (2022)

Music video
- "Acapulco" on YouTube

"Acapulco" is a song by Jason Derulo, released as a single through Atlantic Records on September 3, 2021, accompanied by a music video. The song has charted all across Europe and in Canada, Australia, and New Zealand.

In February 2024, the song was included on Derulo's fifth studio album Nu King.

== Reception ==
Rolling Stone listed it among the worst songs of 2021, saying that it's proof of Derulo "cranking out harmless music".

== Charts ==
=== Weekly charts ===
Weekly chart performance for "Acapulco"
Chart (2021–2022)	Peak position
Australia (ARIA)	30
Austria (Ö3 Austria Top 40)	9
Belgium (Ultratop 50 Flanders)	47
Belgium (Ultratop 50 Wallonia)	19
Canada Hot 100 (Billboard)	54
CIS Airplay (TopHit)	6
Czech Republic Singles Digital (ČNS IFPI)	86
France (SNEP)	53
Germany (GfK)	18
Global 200 (Billboard)	93
Greece International (IFPI)	99
Hungary (Dance Top 40)	37
Hungary (Editors' Choice Top 40)	10
Ireland (IRMA)	51
Lithuania (AGATA)	70
Netherlands (Dutch Top 40)	16
Netherlands (Single Top 100)	30
New Zealand Hot Singles (RMNZ)	11
Norway (VG-lista)	39
Poland Airplay (ZPAV)	13
Romania Airplay (Media Forest)	7
Russia Airplay (TopHit)	4
Slovakia Airplay (ČNS IFPI)	6
Slovakia Singles Digital (ČNS IFPI)	32
South Africa Streaming (TOSAC)	84
Sweden Heatseeker (Sverigetopplistan)	1
Switzerland (Schweizer Hitparade)	23
UK Singles (Official Charts)	65

=== Year-end charts ===
2021 year-end chart performance for "Acapulco"
Chart (2021)	Position
CIS (TopHit)	81
Netherlands (Dutch Top 40)	93
Russia Airplay (TopHit)	79

2022 year-end chart performance for "Acapulco"
Chart (2022)	Position
Austria (Ö3 Austria Top 40)	13
Belgium (Ultratop 50 Wallonia)	97
Germany (Official German Charts)	25
Global Excl. US (Billboard)	174
Switzerland (Schweizer Hitparade)	27

== Certifications ==
Certifications for "Acapulco"
Region	Certification	Certified units/sales
Australia (ARIA)	Platinum	70,000^{‡}
Austria (IFPI Austria)	3× Platinum	90,000^{‡}
Brazil (Pro-Música Brasil)	Gold	20,000^{‡}
Canada (Music Canada)	2× Platinum	160,000^{‡}
Denmark (IFPI Danmark)	Platinum	90,000^{‡}
France (SNEP)	Diamond	333,333^{‡}
Germany (BVMI)	Platinum	400,000^{‡}
Italy (FIMI)	Gold	50,000^{‡}
New Zealand (RMNZ)	Platinum	30,000^{‡}
Poland (ZPAV)	Platinum	50,000^{‡}
Portugal (AFP)	Gold	5,000^{‡}
Spain (Promusicae)	Gold	30,000^{‡}
United Kingdom (BPI)	Silver	200,000^{‡}
^{‡} Sales+streaming figures based on certification alone.
