= Click Clack Symphony =

Single by Raye featuring Hans Zimmer

from the album This Music May Contain Hope.
- Released: 20 March 2026
- Recorded: 2025
- Genre: Pop; orchestral pop
- Length: 5:01
- Label: Human Re Sources
- Songwriters: Raye; Mike Sabath; Hans Zimmer
- Producers: Raye; Mike Sabath; Hans Zimmer; Russell Emanuel; Hendric Buenck

Raye singles chronology
"Nightingale Lane" (2026)	"Click Clack Symphony" (2026)	"Joy" (2026)

Music video
- "Click Clack Symphony" on YouTube

"Click Clack Symphony" (Note: Stylised as "Click Clack Symphony." (with a full stop).) is a song by British singer-songwriter Raye featuring the German film composer Hans Zimmer. The song was released through Human Re Sources on 20 March 2026 as the third single from her second studio album, This Music May Contain Hope. (2026).

The release of "Click Clack Symphony" was accompanied by a music video, which sees Raye experience a journey of liberation as she flies over streets and runs through plains. Commercially, the song reached the top twenty in the United Kingdom, Ireland, Flanders, and Switzerland, and the top forty in Austria, the Netherlands, Norway, and New Zealand. At the 69th Annual Grammy Awards, it received three nominations, including Best Pop Duo/Group Performance.

== Background and release ==
Raye discussed how "Click Clack Symphony" came to be on her Apple Music Radio show in March 2026. She explained that on 1 May 2025 she sent a text message to Zimmer which read: "Hi Hans, this is a very rough demo of a song that I think I want to make on my album. I was wondering if you wanted to work with me on it. No worries if you don't feel any connection to it". Zimmer responded with "I love it, lets speak on the phone". Raye further elaborated that "one orchestra and a lot of hours later", they ended up with the finished song.

Raye debuted the song on the first stop of her tour, This Tour May Contain New Music, in Łódź, Poland, on 22 January 2026. The song was released on 20 March 2026 for digital download and onto streaming services, and was serviced to radio in Italy that same day.

== Composition and lyrics ==
"The song is about the sounds that high heels make. It's about those times in our life when you need your best friends or your siblings to drag you out of the house and say "I know you're not in the best place right now but we need to get outside." Thank goodness for those people in our lives that help us in our dark times."

— Raye, on the meaning behind "Click Clack Symphony",

Raye wrote "Click Clack Symphony" with Zimmer and her frequent collaborator Mike Sabath. It was produced by Raye, Zimmer, Sabath, Hendric Buenck, and Russell Emanuel from Bleeding Fingers Music. According to New Wave Magazine, the song features "contemporary pop elements" and "symphonic arrangements", with "cinematic" orchestration from Zimmer. The beat of the song is repeated click-clacking of high heels. There are also several spoken-word interludes. Lyrically, the song is about "[getting] out of the house and [starting] living again". Writing for the BBC, Mark Savage described the track as a "spiritual sequel" to Raye's "2022 smash 'Escapism'", that "ushers in the light".

== Critical reception ==
Upon release, "Click Clack Symphony" was met by positive critical reception, with Liberty Dunworth of NME branding it an 'empowering new single', and Nmesoma Okechukwu of Euphoria Magazine describing it as a "masterpiece". Dan Harrison of Dork described the song as a "5-star track", while Chris DeVille of Stereogum praised the track's "grand symphonic arrangement" by Zimmer. In June 2026, Billboard included "Click Clack Symphony" on their list of the "50 Best Songs of 2026 So Far" at number sixteen, describing the track as a "perfect thesis statement" for the optimism on This Music May Contain Hope, which captures Raye "at a time of personal tumult, but also now with a newfound conviction that she'll find her way out of it."

== Accolades ==
"Click Clack Symphony" was nominated for Best Pop Duo/Group Performance; Best Arrangement, Instruments and Vocal; and Best Music Video at the 69th Annual Grammy Awards.

== Music video ==
The music video for "Click Clack Symphony" was filmed in early January 2026, primarily in West London. The main sequences were filmed in Pitzhanger Manor in Ealing, and the street scenes were filmed in residential streets in Acton. It was directed by Dave Meyers and follows Raye dancing around a house, transitioning onto a street in West London, and being whisked up into the air by a musical note before flying around over houses and streets. The ending of the video sees Raye running around carelessly through Devil's Dyke, Sussex, declaring that "The cold never lasts my darling, it just teaches the heart how to burn".

== Commercial performance ==
In the United Kingdom, "Click Clack Symphony" debuted at number 18 on the UK singles chart for the week ending 27 March 2026, with 20,286 sales. In doing so, it became Raye's third top twenty entry from This Music May Contain Hope in the country, and Zimmer's first top twenty entry on the UK singles chart. The following week, it rose to a new peak position of number 11 with 25,338 sales. In Ireland, the song debuted at number 25, before rising to number 16 the following week.

Elsewhere, "Click Clack Symphony" reached number 11 in Switzerland, and number 24 in the Netherlands. In Belgium, the song reached number 20 in the Flanders region of the country, while in Australia the song reached number 42. In New Zealand, the song debuted at number 40. "Click Clack Symphony." charted outside the top fifty in Canada, France, Germany, and Sweden. On the Billboard Global 200, the song reached number 68, becoming the second entry on the chart from This Music May Contain Hope.

== Track listing ==
Digital single

1. "Click Clack Symphony" – 5:01

7" single

1. "Click Clack Symphony" – 5:01
2. "Click Clack Symphony" (instrumental) – 5:01

== Charts ==
Weekly chart performance for "Click Clack Symphony"
Chart (2026)	Peak position
Australia (ARIA)	42
Austria (Ö3 Austria Top 40)	38
Belgium (Ultratop 50 Flanders)	20
Canada Hot 100 (Billboard)	61
Croatia International Airplay (Top lista)	99
France (SNEP)	116
Germany (GfK)	53
Global 200 (Billboard)	68
Greece International (IFPI)	26
Ireland (IRMA)	16
Luxembourg (Billboard)	22
Netherlands (Single Top 100)	24
New Zealand (Recorded Music NZ)	40
Norway (IFPI Norge)	25
Portugal (AFP)	47
Sweden (Sverigetopplistan)	55
Switzerland (Schweizer Hitparade)	11
UK Singles (Official Charts)	11
UK Independent (Official Charts)	2
US Bubbling Under Hot 100 (Billboard)	2
US Adult Pop Airplay (Billboard)	30
US Pop Airplay (Billboard)	31
US Rhythmic Airplay (Billboard)	37

== Certifications ==
Certifications for "Click Clack Symphony"
Region	Certification	Certified units/sales
United Kingdom (BPI)	Silver	200,000^{‡}
^{‡} Sales+streaming figures based on certification alone.

== Release history ==
List of release dates and formats
Region	Date	Format	Version	Label	Ref.
Various	20 March 2026	Digital download; streaming	Original	Human Re Sources	
Italy	20 March 2026	Radio airplay	Original	Human Re Sources	
Various	3 April 2026	7-inch single	Original	Human Re Sources	
United States	5 May 2026	Contemporary hit radio	Original	Human Re Sources	
Various	14 October 2026	Digital download; streaming; 12-inch single	Orchestral	Human Re Sources	
