= Punctual (duo) =

British music production duo

Punctual are a UK-based writer-producer duo, composed of John Nicholas Ealand Morgan and William Martyn Morris Lansley.

Punctual has collaborated with artists such as Kylie Minogue, Nelly Furtado, Rita Ora, Clean Bandit, Rudimental, Bebe Rexha, MNEK, Jason Derulo, Ella Henderson, RY X and more. A recent highlight includes 'Life Boat." on RAYE's new album THIS MUSIC MAY CONTAIN HOPE. Their work received a Mercury Prize Nomination and the Album of the Year 2024 Brit Award via "Black Mascara" on RAYE's album, My 21st Century Blues. Their work has also been nominated for Brit Award Song of the Year, for example, "Alibi (ft. Rudimental)" by Ella Henderson.

Their 2020 single, "I Don't Wanna Know", charted at No. 83 on the UK Singles Chart, and their 2023 single, "On & On", charted at No. 30 on Billboard's Hot Dance/Electronic Songs chart. They also produced Raye and Rudimental's "Regardless" and Jason Derulo's "Acapulco", which charted at numbers 37 and 65 on the UK Singles Chart respectively.

== Life and career ==
John Nicholas Ealand Morgan and William Martyn Morris Lansley grew up in Newbury, Berkshire, and met as teenagers after being introduced by a friend with whom both were independently making music, first meeting in a bedroom making music together. Both attended the University of Bristol. In 2016, the pair released "Eva", their debut single, which featured a manipulated voice sample and a B-side track, "Fix". A music video was released for the former in January 2017. They then moved to South London, and in July 2017, the pair released "What I Love" alongside a music video shot on various housing estates in South London, which ended with a long panning shot of the London skyline. In September 2017, the pair released "Fading Youth" alongside a video and an EP, which featured "What I Love", and in July 2018, they released "King Without a Crown", which featured Skinny Living and Kid Ink. In July 2019, they released "Anything (For Your Love)", and the following month, they released "Don't Take It Personal" featuring Malika.

In July 2020, they released a cover of the Mario Winans song "I Don't Wanna Know" after flicking through old R&B acapellas and discovering his, which charted at No. 83 on the UK Singles Chart, and in November 2020, Raye and Rudimental released "Regardless", which Punctual produced, and which charted at No. 37 on the UK Singles Chart. They then released "The Step" with Nabiha, which sampled Missy Elliott's "I'm Really Hot", and "Smoke Ring", which they co-wrote with Gez O'Connell and Jordan Riley, the former of Ritual. In July 2021, they and Aluna Francis of AlunaGeorge released "Summer of Love", an attempt by Francis to relay the emotions she was feeling about 2021, and in September 2021, Jason Derulo released "Acapulco", which was produced by Punctual, and charted at No. 65 on the UK Singles Chart. In March 2022, they, TCTS, and Raphaella released "Love Me or Lie", a song Raphaella wrote during the first COVID-19 lockdown in the United Kingdom about mixed signals received at the beginning of a relationship and recorded in her makeshift home studio in her parents' living room; in an interview with Notion, TCTS stated he approached Punctual with the idea after producing a remix of "I Don't Wanna Know".

In April 2022, they released "We Could Have It All", which Raphaella and Sarah Close wrote the melodies for, and in March 2023, they, Armin van Buuren, and Alika released "On & On", which charted at No. 30 on Billboard's Hot Dance/Electronic Songs chart, and appeared on van Buuren's album Feel Again. In July 2023, their song "Do It All Again" charted at No. 60 on the UK Singles Downloads Chart. The pair then co-wrote Nonô's "Domingo", a song about falling for people not from Latin America, with her and Henry Tucker, hook and melody first; after being asked to expand it by the label, Nonô and Tucker wrote a second verse and had Punctual produce the song. A video was later released for the song.

== Artistry ==
A July 2019 interview with Disco Mix Club stated that the pair cite Flume, Kaytranada, Calvin Harris, and Basement Jaxx as influences, while in a February 2021 interview with Dancing Astronaut, they cited Riton, Rüfüs Du Sol, and Basement Jaxx.

== Discography ==
=== EPs ===
Title	Extended Plays
Eva & Fix	Released: 21 October 2016; Label: Juicebox Recordings; Formats: Digital Download, streaming
Fading Youth	Released: 18 August 2017; Label: RCA Records; Formats: Digital Download, streaming
Do It All Again	Released: 11 February 2022; Label: Monstercat; Formats: Digital Download, streaming
Maze	Released: 13 May 2022; Label: Monstercat; Formats: Digital Download, streaming
You're Not Alone	Released: 26 April 2024; Label: Radiance Records; Formats: Digital Download, streaming

== Singles ==
Title	Year	Album
"King Without Crown" _{(feat. Skinny Living & Kid Ink)}	2018	Non-album singles
"Addicted to You"	2019	Non-album singles
"Anything (For Your Love)"	2019	Non-album singles
"Don't Take It Personal"	2019	Non-album singles
Imagine	2020	Non-album singles
"I Don't Wanna Know"	2020	Non-album singles
"The Step" _{(with Nabiha)}	2021	Non-album singles
"Smoke Ring"	2021	Non-album singles
"Summer of Love"	2021	Non-album singles
"Want You Bad" _{(with KREAM)}	2021	Non-album singles
"Do It All Again"	2022	Maze
"Love Me or Lie"	2022	Non-album single
"We Could Have It All"	2022	Maze
"Castles"	2022	Non-album singles
"Body Language"	2022	Non-album singles
"Blessings"	2023	Non-album singles
"On & On" _{(with Armin Van Buuren feat. Alika)}	2023	Non-album singles
"Fever"	2023	Non-album singles
"Repeating"	2023	Non-album singles
"Omen"	2023	Non-album singles
"Out of the Blue"	2023	Non-album singles
"Shark Teeth"	2023	Non-album singles
"Halo" _{(with Eli & Fur, Richard Judge)}	2024	Non-album singles
"You're Not Alone" _{(with RY X)}	2024	You're Not Alone
"Eyah (You'll Be Alright)" _{(with Westend and Tudor)}	2024	Non-album singles
"Find Love Now" _{(with Cheat Codes, Raphaella)}	2024	Non-album singles
"Perfect" _{(with Lewis Thompson)}	2024	Non-album singles
"Heaven Knows" _{(with Kaskade, Poppy Baskcomb)}	2024	Non-album singles
"Lifeline" _{(with Aiko)}	2024	Non-album singles
"Surround Me" _{(with Camden Cox)}	2025	Non-album singles
"Eden" _{(with Hannah Boleyn)}	2025	Non-album singles
"Angels" _{(with Armin van Buuren)}	2025	Non-album singles
"Falling Up" _{(with Anabel Englund)}	2025	Non-album singles
"Generation Love) _{(with AC/CO, NewEra)}	2025	Non-album singles

== Single remixes and alternate versions ==
Title	Year	Artist
What I Love (Jarreau Vanda Remix)	2017	Punctual
What I Love (KC Lights Remix)	2017	Punctual
Anything (For Your Love) (Club Edit)	2019	Punctual
I Don't Wanna Know (Beau Remix)	2020	Punctual
I Don't Wanna Know (TCTS Remix)	2020	Punctual
I Don't Wanna Know (Mason Maynard Remix)	2020	Punctual
The Step (Acid Mix)	2021	Nabiha, Punctual
The Step (Pola & Bryson Remix)	2021	Nabiha, Punctual
The Step (Zero Remix)	2021	Nabiha, Punctual
Omen (Romain Garcia Remix)	2023	Punctual, Ross Quinn
Omen (Mees Salomé Remix)	2023	Punctual, Ross Quinn
You're Not Alone (&Friends Remix)	2024	Punctual, RY X
You're Not Alone (James Carter Remix)	2024	Punctual, RY X
Heaven Knows (Andrea Botez & biskuwi Remix)	2025	Punctual, Kaskade, Andrea Botez & biskuwi, Poppy Baskcomb
Heaven Knows (DNMO Remix)	2025	Punctual, Kaskade, Poppy Baskcomb, DNMO
Heaven Knows (Shingo Nakamura Remix)	2025	Punctual, Kaskade, Poppy Baskcomb, Shingo Nakamura
On & On (JOA Remix)	2025	Armin van Buuren, Punctual, Alika, JOA

== Remixes ==
Title	Year	Artist
Good Together (Punctual Remix)	2016	HONNE
Feet On the Ground (Punctual Remix)	2016	Luke Fono
Call Me Out (Punctual Remix)	2017	Sarah Close
Slow Motion (Punctual Remix)	2017	Sam Sure, The Magician, TCTS
Way Back (Punctual Remix)	2017	Amber Mark
Yiunger (Punctual Remix)	2019	Jonas Blue, HRVY
Mexico (Punctual Remix)	2019	SHELLS
Bad Tattoo (Punctual Remix)	2019	Tom & Collins
Natalie Don't (Punctual Remix)	2020	Raye
Imagine (Punctual Remix)	2020	Jerome Price
Feelings (Punctual Remix) _{(feat. JB Schofield)}	2020	AWA
Disturbia (Punctual Remix)	2021	Jerome Price, Shaylen
Alligator (Punctual Remix)	2021	Truman
90s Kids (Punctual Remix)	2021	Jax
Somebody to Love (Punctual Remix)	2021	Axel Black & White
Don't Leave Me Lonely (Punctual Remix) _{(Feat. Elley Duhé)}	2022	Clean Bandit
Rush (Punctual Remix)	2023	Troye Sivan
Who Cares (Punctual Remix) _{(with Alex Hosking)}	2023	Janasu
Here (Punctual Remix)	2023	Tom Grennan
Move (Punctual Remix)	2023	Rug, TSB
Feel Good (Punctual Remix)	2025	XANDRA

== Songwriting and production credits ==
Year	Title	Artist	Album	Credits	Writers	Producers
2020	Regardless	RAYE, Rudimental	Euphoric Sad Songs	Co-producers	Rachel Keen, Markus Moser, Nadia Ali	Punctual, Rudimental, Mark Ralph
2020	Poison	Bhaskar	Non-album single	co-writers/co-producers	Corey Sanders, B.P.P. Achkar, C.Sanders, Punctual, M.R Wilson	Punctual, Bhaskar
2020	Imagine (feat. AJ Mitchell)	AJ Mitchell, Frank Walker, Steve Aoki	Non-album single	co-writers	Corey James Sanders, Frank Walker, John Nicholas Ealand Morgan and William Martyn Morris Lansley (Punctual), Matthew Wilson, Steve Aoki	Steve Aoki, Frank Walker
2021	Drama (feat. Poppy Baskcomb)	84 Controller	Non-album single	co-writers/co-producers	Poppy Baskcomb, Henry Tucker, John Nicholas Ealand Morgan and William Martyn Morris Lansley (Punctual), Mamoune Archani	84 Controller, Punctual
2021	Slow Down (feat. Daniel Schulz)	Offrami	Non-album single	co-writers/co-producers	Daniel Mirza, Daniel Schulz, Rami Eid, John Nicholas Ealand Morgan and William Martyn Morris Lansley (Punctual)	Punctual, Offrami
2021	Spinnin	Lovra feat. Justin Jesso	Non-album single	co-producers	Justin Daniel Deimann, Dennis Bierbrodt, Jürgen Dohr, Laura Lungen, Mike Kintish, Stefon Dabruck,	LOVRA, Junkx, Punctual
2021	In the Night	Lucas Estrada	Non-album single	co-writers	René Miller, Dominik Feelsman, Jordan Shaw, Lucas Carlson Estrada, John Nicholas Ealand Morgan and William Martyn Morris Lansley (Punctual)	Lucas, Matt Wave
2021	Acapulco	Jason Derulo	Nu King	co-writers/co-producers	Alex Oriet, David Phelan, Madison Love, Henry Tucker, Jason Desrouleaux, John Nicholas Ealand Morgan and William Martyn Morris Lansley (Punctual)	Punctual, Saltwives
2021	Goodnight	Sleepwalkrs (feat. JP Cooper)	Non-Album Single	co-writers/co-producers	Samuel Brennan, Tom Holling, Connor O'Donnohoe, Ian Janco, John Callum Stewart, John Nicholas Ealand Morgan and William Martyn Morris Lansley (Punctual), Roberto Manfredi	Billen Ted, Punctual, Sleepwalkrs
2021	Stuck In My Head (feat. Rug Wilson)	Sony Fodera, Punctual, RUG	Non-Album Single	co-writers/co-producers	Corey Sanders, Punctual, Matt Wilson, Sonny Fodera	Punctual, Sonny Fodera
2021	Like Home	Robby East	Non-Album Single	co-writers/co-producers	Punctual, Julia Church, Robert Laterveer	Robby East, Punctual
2021	There For You	Everyone You Know	Just for the Times	co-producers	Ben Cullum, Harvey Thomas Kirkby, Rhys Kirkby-Cox,	Everyone You Know, Ben Cullum, Punctual
2022	Waiting For Nothing (Feat. Yaeger)	Hayden James	LIFTED	co-writers/co-producers	Hanna Gillian Kristina Jager, Hayden James Luby, John Nicholas Ealand Morgan and William Martyn Morris Lansley (Punctual)	Hayden James, Punctual
2022	Aint Gonna Dance	KEY	Gasoline - The 2nd Album	co-writers and production	Jack Morgan, John Nicholas Ealand Morgan and William Martyn Morris Lansley (Punctual), RUG, YiYeon Ji	Punctual
2022	Reflections	Alex Mills, Sammy Porter	Non-album Single	co-writers/co-producers	Alexandra Kolontai Mills, Guy James Robin, John Nicholas Ealand Morgan and William Martyn Morris Lansley (Punctual),	Alexandra Kolontai Mills, Guy James Robin, Punctual
2022	People Ain't Dancing	Billen Ted, Kah-lo	Non-album Single	co-writers/co-producers	Sam Brennan, Tom Hollings, Kah-lo, John Nicholas Ealand Morgan and William Martyn Morris Lansley (Punctual)	Billen Ted, Punctual,
2022	Scared	Gigi Moss	Too Hard to Love	co-writers	Gigi Moss, Hypertone, Punctual	
2022	All Shook Up	Karma Child	non-album single	co-writers/co-producers	Poppy Baskcomb, Joe Hike, Marwen Tlili, John Nicholas Ealand Morgan and William Martyn Morris Lansley (Punctual), Robbie McDate	Joe Hike, Marwen Tlili, Punctual
2022	Salvation	Maur, Goodboys	non-album single	co-writers	Daniel Thomas Clare, Dylan Lewis, Nile May, Ethan Shore, John Nicholas Ealand Morgan and William Martyn Morris Lansley (Punctual), Josh Grimmet,	Maur
2022	Jack Flip	Goodboys	non-album single	Co-Producers	Breach	Goodboys, Punctual
2022	Black & Blue	Goodboys	non-album single	co-writers/co-producers	Cameron Warren, Ethan Shore, John Nicholas Ealand Morgan and William Martyn Morris Lansley (Punctual)	Punctual, Goodboys
2022	21 Reasons	Nathan Dawe, Ella Henderson	non-album single	co-writers/co-producers	Ella Henderson, Maegan Cottone, Nathan Dawe, Rune Reilly Koelsch, John Nicholas Ealand Morgan and William Martyn Morris Lansley (Punctual)	Punctual, Nathan Dawe
2022	Things U Said	Coldabank	non-album single	Co-Producers	Elena Kiper, Martin Kierszenbaum, Sergio Galoyan, Trevor Horn, Valery Polienko	Coldabank, Punctual
2022	Go Slow	Mark Mendy, HADES, Richard Judge	non-album single	co-writers/co-producers	Andrei Soanea, Jessica Sharman, Marco Chiavarini, Richard Judge, John Nicholas Ealand Morgan and William Martyn Morris Lansley (Punctual)	Mark Mendy, HADES, Punctual
2022	Believe	ACRAZE, Goodboys	non-album single	Co-producers	Dirk Duderstadt, Marco Duderstadt, Ramon Zenker, Robert Berkeley Davis, Victor Imbres	ACRAZE, Goodboys, Punctual
2023	DOMINGO	Nonô	non-album single	co-writers and production	Henry Tucker, John Nicholas Ealand Morgan and William Martyn Morris Lansley (Punctual), Nonô	Punctual
2023	Past Life	Felix Jaehn, Jonas Blue	non-album single	co-writers/co-producers	Ollie Green, Daniel Deimann, Dennis Bierbradt, Felix Jaehn, Guido Kramer, Guy James Robin, John Nicholas Ealand Morgan and William Martyn Morris Lansley (Punctual), Jürgen Dohr, Phoebe Jasper, Stefan Dabruck	Felix Jaehn, JUNKX, Jonas Blue, Punctual
2023	Not Over Yet (feat. Grace Grundy)	The Stickmen Project	non-album single	co-producers	Paul Oakenfield, Robert Davis, Wyzgowski	Jon Maguire, Punctual, The Stickmen Project
2023	Single Summer	PS1, Richard Judge	non-album single	co-writers/co-producers	Mark Alston, John Nicholas Ealand Morgan and William Martyn Morris Lansley (Punctual), Peter Coniglioro, Richard Judge	PS1, Mark Alston, Peter Conigliorio, Punctual
2023	Sweet	bshp	non-album single	co-writers/co-producers	Nathan Duvall, Gabriella Bishop, John Nicholas Ealand Morgan and William Martyn Morris Lansley (Punctual)	Punctual, Nathan Duvall
2023	The Garden	Navos	non-album single	co-writers/co-producers	Poppy Baskcomb, John Nicholas Ealand Morgan and William Martyn Morris Lansley (Punctual), Ross Harrington	Navos, Punctual
2023	VACANCY	Switch Disco	non-album single	co-writers/co-producers	Maegane Cottone, Ruth-Anne Cunningham, Dan Creasy, Nikos Kalogerias, John Nicholas Ealand Morgan and William Martyn Morris Lansley (Punctual)	Switch Disco, Punctual
2023	Netflix (Better Now Without You)	needanamebro, Say Now	non-album single	co-writers/co-producers	Issey Cross, James Essien, Moon Willis, John Nicholas Ealand Morgan and William Martyn Morris Lansley (Punctual)	Moon Willis, Punctual
2023	Hey DJ	Joel Corry	non-album single	co-writers/co-producers	Neave Applebaum, Joel Corry, John Nicholas Ealand Morgan and William Martyn Morris Lansley (Punctual), Pablo Bowman, Roc Star	Joel Corry, Neave Applebaum, Punctual
2023	Move	RUG, TSB	non-album single	co-writers/co-producers	Britten Newbill, Punctual, RUG	TSB, Punctual
2023	Back To You	Duvall, Navvy	non-album single	co-writers/co-producers	Corey Saunders, Nathan Duvall, John Nicholas Ealand Morgan and William Martyn Morris Lansley (Punctual), Phoebe Lee Jasper	Corey Saunders, Duvall, Punctual
2023	Kiss Me On the Weekend	Hypertone	non-album single	production	Alex Larsson, Shaun Barrett	Punctual
2023	Heart Still Beating	Nathan Dawe, Bebe Rexha	non-album single	co-writers/co-producers	Bebe Rexha, Eliza Rose, Ella Henderson, John Nicholas Ealand Morgan and William Martyn Morris Lansley (Punctual), Nathan Dawe	Punctual, Nathan Dawe
2023	Further Away	Goodboys, Benny Benassi	non-album single	co-writers/co-producers	Conor Blake Manning, Ethan Shore, Giancarlo Constantin, John Nicholas Ealand Morgan and William Martyn Morris Lansley (Punctual), Jordan Shaw, Josh Grimmett, Marco Benassi	Benny Benassi, Constantin, Punctual
2023	Surrender	Goodboys	non-album single	co-writers/co-producers	Ethan Shore, Freek Geuze, Punctual, Jordan Shaw, Joshua Grimmett	Punctual, Freek, Geuze, Goodboys
2023	Oh Baby	Nathan Dawe, Bru-C, BSHP, Issey Cross	non-album single	co-writers/co-producers	Craig Hayward, Gabriella Bishop, Issey Cross, John Nicholas Ealand Morgan and William Martyn Morris Lansley (Punctual), Josh Bruce, Ken Gold, Matthew Walker, Michael Denne, Nathan Dawe	Punctual, Nathan Dawe, Shapes
2023	Dance Around It	Joel Corry, Caity Baser	non-album single	co-writers/co-producers	Hight, Caity Baser, Joel Corry, John Nicholas Ealand Morgan and William Martyn Morris Lansley (Punctual)	Punctual, Joel Corry
2023	16 Again	Lewis Thompson, MNEK Paul Woolford	non-album single	co-writers/co-producers	Corey Sanders, Lewis Thompson, MNEK, Robert Michael Nelson Harvey, Paul Woolford, John Nicholas Ealand Morgan and William Martyn Morris Lansley (Punctual)	Paul Woolford, Lewis Thompson, Punctual
2023	Back to Zero Base	ZeroBaseOne	YOUTH IN THE SHADE	co-writers	Cho Yun Kyoung, danke, Danny Shah, Jordan Shaw, John Nicholas Ealand Morgan and William Martyn Morris Lansley (Punctual), Suh Jieum, YIYIJIN	
2023	Running	Westend	Non-album single	co-writers/co-producers	Poppy Baskcomb, John Nicholas Ealand Morgan and William Martyn Morris Lansley (Punctual, Reece Pullinger, Tyler Morris	Punctual, Westend
2023	Morning Light	Le Youth	About Us	co-writers	Hanna Jäeger, Punctual, Wesley Quinonez	Le Youth Punctual
2023	Pas De Bourree	Armin Van Buuren (feat. Lucky Lou)	Feel Again	co-writers/co-producers	Armin Van Buuren, Benno de Goeji, John Nicholas Ealand Morgan and William Martyn Morris Lansley (Punctual), Louise Lindberg	Armin Van Buuren, Benno de Goeji, Punctual
2023	Black Mascara	Raye	My 21st Century Blues	co-writers and production	Rachel Keen, John Nicholas Ealand Morgan and William Martyn Morris Lansley (Punctual)	Punctual
2023	Waitin On It	VAVO	non-Album Single	co-writers and production	Alden Martin, Jesse Fishcher, John Nicholas Ealand Morgan and William Martyn Morris Lansley (Punctual), Jordan Shaw, Stephen Puth,	VAVO, Punctual
2023	0800 Heaven	Nathan Dawe, Joel Corry, Ella Henderson	non-Album Single	co-writers/co-producers	Maegan Cottone, Joel Corry, Joe Barbe, Ella Henderson, John Nicholas Ealand Morgan and William Martyn Morris Lansley (Punctual)	Nathan Dawe, Joel Corry, Punctual
2023	Bling Bling	Altégo	non-Album Single	co-writers/co-producers	Raphaella Christine Aristocleous, Harold Fatlermeyer, Lukas Fernandes-Pendse, Michael Fernandes-Pendse, John Nicholas Ealand Morgan and William Martyn Morris Lansley (Punctual)	Altégo, Punctual
2023	Not Ready To Let Go	Jethro Heston	non-Album Single	co-writers	Mike Kintish, Jess Morgan, Jethro Heston, John Nicholas Ealand Morgan and William Martyn Morris Lansley (Punctual).	Jethro Heston
2023	REACT	Switch Disco, Ella Henderson, Robert Miles	non-Album Single	co-producers	Maegan Cottone, Ella Henderson, Robert Miles	Punctual, Robert Miles, Switch Disco
2024	Hello	Kylie Minogue	Tension II	co-writers/co-producers	Ian Wroldsen, Neave Applebaum, John Nicholas Ealand Morgan and William Martyn Morris Lansley (Punctual)	Punctual, Neave Applebaum
2024	Under the Sun (with Alok)	Ella Henderson, Switch Disco, Alok	non-album single	co-writers/co-producers	Maegan Cottone, Chris Rea, Dan Creasy, Ella Henderson, John Nicholas Ealand Morgan and William Martyn Morris Lansley (Punctual), Nikos Kalogerias	Switch Disco, Punctual, Alok
2024	Morning Light	Aaron Hibell	non-album single	co-writers	Sophia Brenan, Aaron Hibell, John Nicholas Ealand Morgan and William Martyn Morris Lansley (Punctual), Matt Wilson	Aaron Hibell
2024	Couldn't Care Less (feat. Gia Koka)	ALTÉGO, Gia Koka	non-album single	production	Gia Koka, Jon Erikkson, Lukas Fernandes-Pendse, Michael Fernandes-Pendse, Orjan Oberg, Ranis Edenberg	Punctual
2024	I'm the Drama	Bebe Rexha	non-album single	co-producers	Bebe Wrexha, Caitlin Stubbs, Hannah Boleyn, Jimmy James	Jimmy James, Punctual
2024	Chase It (Mmm Da Da Da)	Bebe Rexha	non-album single	co-producers	Bebe Rexha, Chris Lake, Aluna Francis	Chris Lake, Punctual, Sammy Virji, Marco Straus
2024	Summertime Blues (feat. Nathan Nicholson)	Chris Lake, Sammy Virji, Nathan Nicholson	non-album single	co-writers / co-producers	Chris Lake, John Nicholas Ealand Morgan and William Martyn Morris Lansley (Punctual), Nathan Nicholson, Sammy Virji	Chris Lake, Sammy Virji, Punctual
2024	Stubborn	DJ Zinc, IYAMAH	non-album single	co-writers / co-producers	DJ Zinc, John Nicholas Ealand Morgan and William Martyn Morris Lansley (Punctual), Sophie Bond	DJ Zinc, Punctual
2024	Don't (Fall In Love)	Just Kiddin	non-album single	co-writers	Harlee Jayne Sudworth, Lewis Thompson, Henry Tucker, John Nicholas Ealand Morgan and William Martyn Morris Lansley (Punctual), Laurie Revell	
2024	Ten (Get Back Up)	MNEK, Nathan Dawe	non-album single	co-producers	Bill Maybury, Phil Plested, Tre Jean-Marie, Uzoechi Emenike, Lewis Thompson, Nathan Dawe, Riley Jean-Marie	Nathan Dawe, Punctual, Tre Jean-Marie
2024	We Ain't Here For Long	Nathan Dawe	non-album single	co-writers / co-producers	Karen Poole, Neave Applebaum, John Nicholas Ealand Morgan and William Martyn Morris Lansley (Punctual), Nathan Dawe, Sam Harper	Nathan Dawe, Neave Applebaum, Punctual
2024	Push the Tempo	Katy B, Sub Focus	non-album single	co-writers / co-producers	John Nicholas Ealand Morgan and William Martyn Morris Lansley (Punctual), Karen Poole, Kathleen Brien, Nicolas Douwma	Sub Focus, Punctual
2024	Exit Lights	Lilly Ahlberg, Shane Codd	non-album single	co-writers / co-producers	Kye Sones, John Nicholas Ealand Morgan and William Martyn Morris Lansley (Punctual), Sarah Sheldrake, Shane Codd	Shance Codd, Punctual
2024	Midnight	VASSY	non-album single	production	Charlton Hill, Justin Shave, Phil Bentley, Karagiogos	Punctual
2024	Murder	Cascada	Studio 24	co-writers	Maegan Cottone, Olivia Sebastianelli, John Nicholas Ealand Morgan and William Martyn Morris Lansley (Punctual), Natalie Horler	Christian Geller
2024	All In	YouNotUs, Laurell	non-album single	co-writers	Buddha, Frazer Mac, Gregor Sahm, Jenny Berggren, Malin Berggren, Tobias Philippsen	YouNotUs, Punctual
2024	Switch Disco, Charlotte Haining, Felix	I FOUND YOU	non-album single	co-producers	Charlotte Haining, Maegan Cottone, René Miller, Ben Frank Duncombe, Cassio Ware, Cheri Williams, Dan Creasy, Derek Jenkins, Dwayne Richardson, Francis Reuben Wright, Nikos Kalogerias	Switch Disco, Felix, Franklin, Punctual
2024	Caroline	Symmetrik	non-album single	co-writers / co-producers	Maegan Cottone, Curtis Darren Lagan, David Ryan McCoubriey, Julia Church, John Nicholas Ealand Morgan and William Martyn Morris Lansley (Punctual)	Punctual, Symmetrik
2024	Blew My Life Up	CamrinWatsin	non-album single	co-producers	CamrinWatsin, Julia Church, Tim Powell	CamrinWatsin, Tim Powell, Punctual
2024	LONELY (feat. Calle Lehmann)	Gryffin, Slippy	PULSE	co-producers	Calle Lehmann, Albin Clern, Gryffin	Gryffin, Albin Clern, Punctual
2024	Alibi (feat. Rudimental)	Ella Henderson	non-album single	co-writers and co-producers	Maegan Cottone, Ella Henderson, Olivia Sebastianelli, Ruth-Anne Cunningham, Artis Ivey Jr, Doug Rasheed, John Nicholas Ealand Morgan and William Martyn Morris Lansley (Punctual), Larry Sanders, Stevie Wonder	Punctual, Rudimental
2024	Kisses (feat. bbyclose)	BL3SS, CamrinWatsin, bbyclose	non-album single	co-writers and co-producers	John Nicholas Ealand Morgan and William Martyn Morris Lansley (Punctual), Sarah Close, Stevie Appleton, Will Manning	BL3SS, Camrin Watson, Punctual
2024	Rage	Charlotte Plank	non-album single	co-writers and co-producers	Bradley Moss, Charlotte Plank, Georgia Meek, John Nicholas Ealand Morgan and William Martyn Morris Lansley (Punctual)	Punctual, Ghostly, Champion, Skantia
2024	Nightshift	Charlotte Plank	non-album single	co-writers and production	Andy Cato, Charlotte Plank, Jenson Vaughan, John Nicholas Ealand Morgan and William Martyn Morris Lansley (Punctual), Jonathan White, Keeling Lee, Michael Daniel, Paul Graham, Thomas Findlay	Punctual
2024	Shivers	Camden Cox	non-album single	co-writers and production	Camden Cox, John Nicholas Ealand Morgan and William Martyn Morris Lansley (Punctual)	Punctual
2025	Body Talk	Issey Cross	non-album single	co-composers, mixers and production	Ella Mayjor, Issey Cross, John Morgan, Rug Wilson, Will Lansley	Punctual
2025	Think About Us	Sonny Fodera, D.O.D, Poppy Baskcomb	non-album single	co-writers and production	Sonny Fodera, Poppy Baskcomb, Stuart Crichton, William Lansley, John Morgan	Sonny Fodera, D.O.D, Punctual, Kevin Grainger, Stuart Crichton
2025	Blackberries	FISHER, bbyclose	non-album single	co-writers	bbyclose, Paul Nicholas Fisher, Stevie Appleton, William Lansley, John Morgan	FISHER
2025	FADED	HAYLA, Nelly Furtado	non-album single	co-writers and production	Nelly Furtado, John Morgan, Hayley Williams, William Lansley, Lizzie Nightingale, Matthew David Ossentjuk	Punctual
2025	On & On	Sub Focus, bbyclose	non-album single	co-writers and production	Sub Focus, bbyclose, John Morgan, William Lansley, Karen Poole	Sub Focus, Punctual
2025	Energy	Tinie Tempah, Alex Mills	non-album single	co-writers and production	Alex Mills, Patrick Okogwu, Liam Anthony Codner, Holly Nikita Quin-Ankrah, John Morgan, William Lansley	Jason Cambridge, Punctual
2025	Set Me Free	Armin van Buuren, SACHA	non-album single	production	Armin van Buuren, Toby Scott, Hannah Wilson, Sacha Marie Taylor	Armin van Buuren, Toby Scott, Punctual
2025	Friday, I'm In Luv (feat. bbyclose)	Alok, Alan Fitzpatrick, bbyclose	non-album single	production	bbyclose, Alan Dean Fitzpatrick, Alok Achkar Peres Petrillo, David Robertson, Joseph Richard Doyle, Richard Boardman, Sarah Elizabeth Blanchard	Alok, LAZY JOE, OHYES, Punctual
2025	ego	bbyclose	non-album single	co-writers and production	bbyclose, Xoro, Giacomo Uber, John Morgan, William Lansley	Punctual, Kevin Grainger
2025	Here In Your Arms	Nathan Dawe, Abi Flynn	non-album single	production	Nathan Dawe, Abi Flynn, Neave Applebaum, Issey Cross	Nathan Dawe, Fanu, Mike Hillier, Neave Applebaum, Punctual
2025	Heartstrings	Disrupta, goddard., Charlotte Haining	non-album single	production	Charlotte Haining, Kieran Leach, Kieron Mcintosh, Camden Cox, Rêve	Disrupta, goddard., House of EL, Punctual, Jay Reynolds
2025	Sun Goes Down	KSHMR	non-album single	co-write	Avery Flint Berman, John Morgan, William Lansley, Niles Hollowell-Dhar, Noemia Lellis Marques Felippe	KSHMR, DNMO
2025	Feel Again	TELYKAST, Moa	non-album single	co-writers and production	Linus Altman Kurosaki, Trevor Klaiman, Kyle Tonoli, Moa Pettersson Hammar, Sophie Simmons, William Lansley, John Morgan	TELYKAST, Punctual
2025	Sunlight	Navos, Jem Cooke	non-album single	co-writers and production	Jemma Cooke, Ross Harrington, John Morgan, William Lansley	Punctual, Navos
2025	Paradise	Goodboys, KREAM		co-write	Joshua Grimmett, Ethan Shore, William Lansley, John Morgan, Conor Blake, Daniel Slettebakken, Markus Slettebakken	Goodboys, KREAM, Max Mylo
2025	Closer To The Floor	Jazzy, Ankhoï	non-album single	co-writers and production	Ankhoï, Mark Ralph, TAET, Sam Harper, Yasmine Byrne, John Morgan, William Lansley, Joseph Louis Stone, Lawrence Davis, Paul Klein	Ankhoï, Punctual, Mark Ralph, TAET, Sam Harper, Gemma Chester, Josh Green
2025	Kiss It Better	Jodie Harsh		co-writers and production	Jay Clarke, John Morgan, William Lansley, Maia Wright, Conor Blake Manning, Leroy Burgess	Jodie Harsh, Punctual
2025	All Eyes on Me	DJ Zinc, brazy		co-writers and production	DJ Zinc, crazy, William Lansley, John Morgan	DJ Zinc, Kevin Grainger, Punctual
2025	Over You	Nathan Dawe, Shayan		production	Nathan Dawe, Shayan, Robert James Harvey, Abi Flynn, Ellis Miah	Nathan Dawe, Bobby Harvey, James F Reynolds, Punctual, Stuart Hawkes
2025	HIDEAWAY	Switch Disco, Tones and I		production	Kiesa Rae Ellestad, Rami Samir Afuni	Switch Disco, Punctual, Richard Stolz, Timofey Reznikov, Ollie Knight
2025	Can You?	Jess Bays, Hayley May		co-writers and production	Jess Bays, Hayley May, William Lansley, John Morgan	Jess Bays, Punctual
2025	No One Else	Two Friends, Corbyn Besson	non-album single	co-write	Two Friends, Corbyn Besson, Ollie Green, Jordan Shaw, Matt Halper, Eli Sones, John Morgan, William Lansley	Two Friends, Cass Irvine
2025	Cheap Champagne	Sam Feldt, Sophie Stray	non-album single	co-writers and production	Sam Klempner, Arjen Thonen, John Morgan, William Langley, Sam Renders, Lauren Keen, Taet Christie Chesterton	Sam Feldt, Sam Klempner, Arjen Thonen, Punctual, Richello
2025	Nights Like These (with Rag'n'Bone Man)	Rag'n'Bone Man, Rudimental	non-album single	production	Mike Needle, Leon Rolle, Kesi Dryden, Piers Aggett, Rory Graham, Jonny Coffer	Rudimental, Jonny Coffer, Punctual, Brad Ellis, Jay Reynolds
2025	Nightmares (feat. Issey Cross)	Hamdi, Issey Cross	non-album single	co-writers and production	Issey Cross, Alexander Hamdi, Ella Mayjor, RUG, William Lansley, John Morgan	Hamdi, Punctual
2025	Only One	TS7, Katie May	non-album single	production	Thomas Graham Denis Tufft	TS7, Punctual, James F Reynolds
2025	EUPHORIA	IN PARALLEL, Charlotte Haining	non-album single	co-write	Charlotte Haining, Harrison Baker, George Stevenson, Taet Chesterton, John Morgan, William Lansley, Benjamin Petit	IN PARALLLEL
2025	Guestlist (feat. SACHA)	cassö, SACHA	non-album single	co-writers and production	Sacha Marie Taylor, John Morgan, William Lansley, Cameron Cassels, Jordan Shaw, Mark Ralph	cassö, Mark Ralph, Punctual, Ollie Knight
2025	Hold On	Nathan Dawe, Abi Flynn	non-album single	co-writers and production	Nathan Dawe, Abi Flynn, Ben Duncombe, Bradley Philip Wescott, John Morgan, William Lansley, Robert Conlon, Tim Powell	Nathan Dawe, FENCHVRCH, Franklin, Jeremy Cooper, Punctual
2025	You Go I Go	Jackie Hollander	non-album single	co-writers and production	Jacqueline Hollander, Richard Judge, William Lansley, John Morgan, Solveigh Rebekka Danielsson, Sam Fisher	Jackie Hollander, Punctual
2025	Thinking Bout You More	Denon Reed, Cru2	non-album single	co-writers and production	Denon Reed, John Morgan, William Lansley, Chrystal Orchard	Denon Reed, Punctual, Chrystal, Lewi White
2025	Lick (Fantasy)	ALTÉGO	non-album single	co-write	Poppy Paloma Baskcomb, John Morgan, William Lansley, Karen Harding, Lukas Fernandes-Pendse, Michael Fernandes-Pendse, Chris Bridges, Shondrae Crawford, Jordan Shaw	ALTÉGO, Wez Clarke, Stuart Hawkes
2025	If Only	1991	non-album single	co-write	Frederick Russell Rossington Webb, William Lansley, John Morgan, Sam Harper, Alexandria Jane Eyre	1991
2025	Tell Me Why You're Here	Andrea Botez	non-album single	co-write	Andrea Botez, William Lansley, John Morgan, Poppy Baskcomb, Lewis Martinee	Andrea Botez
2025	Gotta Go	Eli Brown, DANNY AVILA, SACHA	non-album single	co-write	Daniel Avila Roson, Sacha Marie Taylor, John Morgan, William Lansley, Alex Chapman, Nick Lopez, Gavin Harris	Eli Brown
2025	Fast Forward	Jason Ross, Horyzon, Camden Cox, TW3LVE	non-album single	co-write	Jason Ross, Camden Cox, Gabriel Montecinos Soto, John Morgan, William Lansley, Lilly Ahlberg	Jason Ross, Gabriel Montecinos Soto
2026	Life Boat.	Raye	This Music May Contain Hope	co-composers	Rachel Keen, Punctual, Riley	Raye, Riley, Punctual
2026	New Religion	Bebe Rexha, Faithless	Dirty Blonde	co-writers and production	Neave Applebaum, Bebe Rexha, John Morgan, William Lansley, Jake Torrey, Dominic Perfetti, Jonathan Bach, NOVODOR, Violet Skies, Rollo Armstrong, Maxwell Fraser, Ayalah Bentovim	Bebe Rexha, Punctual, Neave Applebaum, Daniel Cullen, Cameron Hogan Jake Rene, Alex Lee, Kevin Grainger, Ghazi, Alex Gomme
2026	I Like You Better Than Me	Bebe Rexha	Dirty Blonde	co-writers and production	Bebe Rexha, John Morgan, William Lansley, Jake Torrey, Nate Ferraro	Bebe Rexha, Punctual, Karl Rubin, Jean Baptiste, Ryan Buendia, Victor Thell, Daniel Cullen, Cameron Hogan, Jake Rene, Alex Lee, Kevin Grainger, Alex Gomme
2026	Beat Is Jumping	Morgan Seatree, Carla Monroe	non-album single	co-writers and production	Morgan Seatree, Carla Monroe, Conor Blake Manning, John Morgan, William Lansley	Morgan Seatree, Punctual, Paul Sirrell, Tommy Mc
2026	Stuck In A Loop	Joel Corry	non-album single	co-writers and production	Joel Corry, John Morgan, William Lansley, Camden Cox, Laura Welsh	Joel Corry, Punctual
2026	Holding On	Friction, Sam Harper	non-album single	co-writers and production	Edward Keeley, Sam Harper, John Morgan, William Lansley	Friction, Punctual
