= Absolutely (musician) =

British singer, songwriter, producer

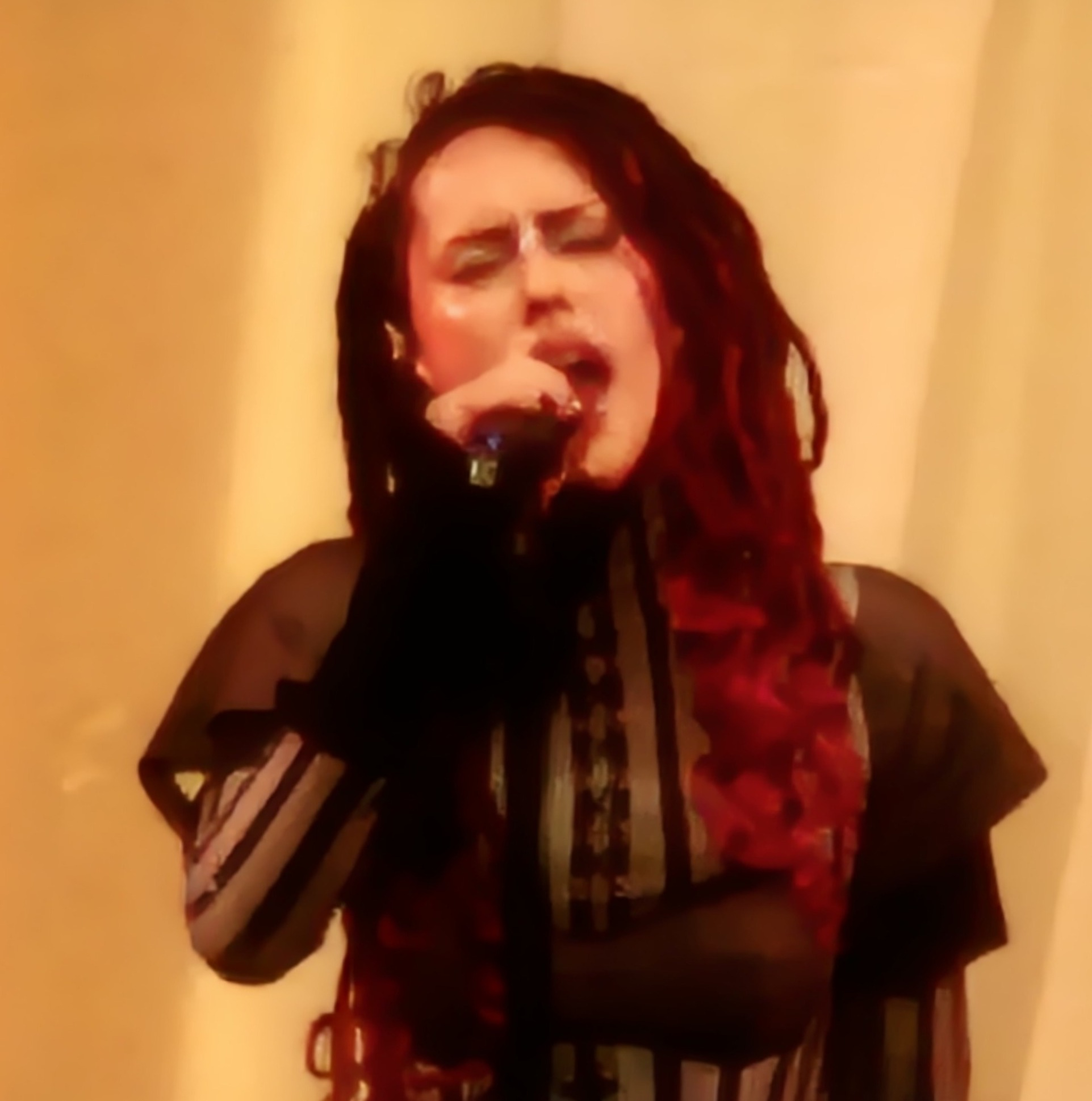
- Absolutely performing on Raye's This Tour May Contain New Music in Łódź, 2026
- Born: Abby-Lynn Keen; 3 January 2004 (age 22); Tooting, London, England
- Other names: àB, Abby Keen
- Occupations: Singer-songwriter; producer
- Years active: 2019–present
- Relatives: Raye (sister); Amma (sister)
- Musical career
- Genres: R&B; pop; EDM
- Instrument: Vocals
- Labels: S10; Black Butter; Epic Records; BMG
- Website: absolutelyofficial.com

Abby-Lynn Keen (born 3 January 2004), known professionally as Absolutely, and also known as àB or Abby Keen, is a British singer-songwriter. Her debut album, Cerebrum, was released on 17 November 2023, followed by her second album, Paracosm, on 20 February 2026. Her music blends R&B, pop, and EDM, and she is currently signed to Epic Records. Keen is also known for her songwriting contributions to Jesy Nelson, Teddy Swims and Giveon, as well as various projects by Normani, Anitta, and Leigh-Anne.

== Early life ==
Hailing from Tooting in South London, Keen was born to a Swiss-Ghanaian mother and a British father, musician/producer Paul Keen. Keen was born into a musical family and started making music around the age of 12-13. Her oldest sister, Rachel, has charted internationally under the pop alias Raye, and her other older sister, Lauren, is also a singer-songwriter known as Amma. Keen first went viral in her early teens with a series of lifestyle videos on social media. After several initial songwriting successes, Keen moved to Los Angeles.

== Career ==
=== 2019–present: First EPs, songwriting works, and Cerebrum ===
In 2019, Keen independently-released a series of EPs under the alias àB. In 2023, after receiving her first songwriting hits for Nelson and Normani, Keen decided to rebrand to the name Absolutely coupled with the release of debut single "Higher". She also subsequently released debut major-label album Cerebrum, executive produced by Dave Hamelin, to acclaim in 2023. Standout single "MIA" was described by writer Steffanee Wang of art-fashion publication Nylon as "genuinely great", noting "a dash of rockish guitar, a bit of woozy soul, and a dose wobbly, discordant synths. There’s a strong melodic backbone that she adorns with her own quirks, scuzzying it up with contrasting textures while her silky voice flies free." Keen also supported her sister on the Manchester, Birmingham and Glasgow dates of her My 21st Century Blues Tour.

In 2025, Keen was announced to be performing at All Points East festival in London, alongside her sisters. Keen released single "I Just Don't Know You Yet" after teasers for the song went viral on video-sharing app TikTok. She was also announced as the opening act for the 2026 European dates of Reneé Rapp's Bite Me Tour and her sister Raye's This Tour May Contain New Music. On February 26, 2026, Keen released her second studio album Paracosm with production from Danja, Johan Lenox, Dave Hamelin, and Jahaan Sweet, among others.

== Discography ==
=== Studio albums ===
Title	Details
Cerebrum	Released: 17 November 2023; Label: Epic Records; Format: Digital download, streaming
Paracosm	Released: 20 February 2026; Label: Epic Records; Format: CD, vinyl, digital download, streaming

=== Extended Play ===
as àB

Title	Details
September	Released: 20 September 2019; Label: Self-released; Format: Digital download, streaming
October	Released: 16 October 2019; Label: Self-released; Format: Digital download, streaming
November	Released: 15 November 2019; Label: Self-released; Format: Digital download, streaming
December	Released: 6 December 2019; Label: Self-released; Format: Digital download, streaming

=== Singles ===
Title	Year	Album
"Higher"	2023	Cerebrum
"Patterns"	2023	Cerebrum
"Fever Dream"	2023	Cerebrum
"Stranger Phase"	2023	Cerebrum
"Speak Up"	2023	Cerebrum
"24 Hours"	2023	Cerebrum
"Symphony"	2023	Cerebrum
"MIA"	2023	Cerebrum
"Close to You"	2023	Cerebrum
"Goodbye Glitter"	2025	Paracosm
"I Just Don't Know You Yet"	2025	Paracosm
"No Audience"	2025	Paracosm
"Paracosm"	2026	Paracosm

=== Guest appearances ===
Title	Year	Artist	Album
"Love Me Again" (background vocals)	2019	Raye	Euphoric Sad Songs
"333"	2021	Tinashe	333
"Get Together"	2021	David Guetta	Non-album single
"Stay with Me"	2023	Louis the Child	The Sun Comes Up
"Waterslides" (with Rudimental)	2024	Tiësto	
"See Through (remix)" (featuring Coco Jones & Samara Cyn)	2024	Amelia Moore	
"Real Love" (with Isaiah Roberts)	2024	One House	Eyes Up
"Shades"	2024	Snakehips	Non-album single
"New Woman" (with Rosalía) (background vocals)	2024	Lisa	Alter Ego
"Rather Be" (background vocals)	2025	Giveon	Beloved
"Twenties" (background vocals)	2025	Giveon	Beloved
"Everybody Knows I'm Sad"	2025	Marina	Princess of Power
"Air"	2025	The Chainsmokers	Breathe
"Joy" (featuring Amma)	2026	Raye	This Music May Contain Hope
"Walls (Live)"	2026	Jonas Brothers	Friends from Your Hometown
"Don't Believe It"	2026	John Summit	Ctrl Escape

=== Selected songwriting and production credits ===
Title	Year	Artist	Album
"Amor Real (Holiday Song)"	2020	Anitta	Non-album single
"The Chase"	2021	Tinashe	333
"Naturally"	2021	Tinashe	333
"Little Bit of Fun" (featuring Anne-Marie)	2021	KSI	All Over the Place (Deluxe Edition)
"Suéltate" (featuring Anitta, Bia and Jarina De Marco)	2021	Sam i	Sing 2
"Roadside" (featuring AJ Tracey)	2021	Mahalia	Non-album singles
"Boyz" (featuring Nicki Minaj)	2021	Jesy Nelson	Non-album singles
"Fair"	2022	Normani	Non-album singles
"Gata" (featuring Chencho Corleone)	2022	Anitta	Versions of Me
"Gimme Your Number" (featuring Ty Dolla Sign)	2022	Anitta	Versions of Me
"Maria Elegante" (featuring Afro B)	2022	Anitta	Versions of Me
"Faking Love" (featuring Saweetie)	2022	Anitta	Versions of Me
"Melt Away"	2023	Taeyeon	To. X
"On + On" (featuring Justine Skye)	2023	Austin Millz	Breathwork
"Magic"	2023	Kiana Ledé	Grudges
"In My Bag"	2023	Mahalia	IRL
"Bag of You"	2023	Mahalia	IRL
"OMG"	2024	Leigh-Anne	No Hard Feelings
"I'll Still Be Here"	2024	Leigh-Anne	No Hard Feelings
"All Yours"	2024	Normani	Dopamine
"Feeling Lucky" (with Jackson Wang)	2024	Bibi	Non-album singles
"Pieces"	2024	Carlina de Place	Non-album singles
"Thunder"	2025	Lisa	Alter Ego
"Lifestyle"	2025	Lisa	Alter Ego
"Are You Even Real" (featuring Giveon)	2025	Teddy Swims	I've Tried Everything but Therapy (Part 2)
"All of Me"	2025	Nao	Jupiter
"Gucci Mane"	2025	Jessie Murph	Sex Hysteria
"Heaven"	2026	Leigh-Anne	My Ego Told Me To
"Heaven Baby" (featuring Zayn)	2026	Ayra Starr	Starr Girl

== Tours ==
Supporting

- Raye – My 21st Century Blues Tour (2023–2024)
- BANKS – Off With Her Head Tour (2025)
- Reneé Rapp – Bite Me Tour (2026)
- Raye – This Tour May Contain New Music (2026)

== Awards and nominations ==
=== Berlin Music Video Awards ===
The Berlin Music Video awards is an international event that promotes the art of music videos.

Year	Nominated work	Award	Result	Ref.
2026	"I JUST DON'T KNOW YOU YET"	Best Concept	Nominated	
