= Joy (Raye song) =

Single by Raye featuring Amma and Absolutely

from the album This Music May Contain Hope
- B-side: "Joy" (instrumental)
- Released: 7 September 2026
- Length: 4:23
- Label: Human Re Sources
- Songwriters: Rachel Keen; Abby-Lynn Keen; Lauren Keen; Tom Richards; Mike Sabath
- Producers: Raye; Richards; Sabath

Raye singles chronology
"Click Clack Symphony" (2026)	"Joy" (2026)

Music video
- "Joy" on YouTube

"Joy" (Note: Stylised as "Joy." (with a full stop).) is a song by British singer-songwriter Raye featuring her sisters Amma and Absolutely. The song was released as a single through Human Re Sources on 7 September 2026 as the fourth single from her second studio album, This Music May Contain Hope (2026).

An accompanying music video was released simultaneously with the song, which features Raye and her sisters travelling through London in the "Joymobile" and surprising people with sunflowers while capturing their reactions. Commercially, "Joy" reached number 93 in the United Kingdom, and the top forty on airplay charts in Australia, Ireland, and the United States.

== Composition ==
"Joy" incorporates a sample from the song "Damn Right I Am Somebody" (1974) by the J.B.'s, specifically a section where James Brown utters the phrase "Mr Ray, are you somebody?". According to Emma Dodds of Rayo, the song's lyrics are about "attempting to make the decision to feel happy after a period of sadness. It's about how, although devastating things may happen, it's important to try to pick yourself up and choose the light".

== Music video ==
The music video for "Joy" was released alongside the song on 7 September 2026, and was directed by Otis Dominique, with creative direction from Mikey Robbins. The video follows Raye and her sisters through London in the "Joymobile", surprising people with sunflowers and capturing their reactions. It also features an on-screen "smile counter" which keeps track of the smiles they receive throughout their day, alongside the song's lyrics interspersed with humorous comments from the singers.

== Promotion ==
In April 2026, Raye performed "Joy" with her sisters on The Late Show with Stephen Colbert. In June, she performed the song at the Capital Summertime Ball. In September, Raye partnered with Lime, whereby 500 of the company's e-bikes in London will play a snippet of "Joy" upon being unlocked.

== Commercial performance ==
After four days of release as a single, "Joy" debuted and peaked at number 93 on the UK Singles Chart on 11 September 2026, becoming Raye's thirty-second entry on the chart. It also topped the vinyl and physical singles charts, and reached number three on the overall UK Singles Sales Chart. On the UK Singles Downloads Chart, the song peaked at number 18 for the chart week dated 2 October 2026. Elsewhere, "Joy" reached the top twenty on the airplay charts in Australia and Ireland, and the top forty on the Billboard Pop Airplay chart in the United States.

== Track listing ==
Digital single

1. "Joy" – 4:23

7" single

1. "Joy" – 4:23
2. "Joy" (instrumental) – 4:23

== Charts ==
=== Weekly charts ===
Weekly chart performance
Chart (2026)	Peak position
Australia Airplay (RCS)	14
Estonia Airplay (TopHit)	77
Germany Airplay (MusicTrace)	77
Ireland Airplay (Radiomonitor)	10
Italy Airplay (EarOne)	77
Lithuania Airplay (TopHit)	52
UK Singles (Official Charts)	93
UK Independent (Official Charts)	17
UK Airplay (Radiomonitor)	7
UK Christian Airplay (Cross Rhythms)	1
US Pop Airplay (Billboard)	31

=== Monthly charts ===
Monthly chart performance
Chart (2026)	Peak position
Estonia Airplay (TopHit)	85
Lithuania Airplay (TopHit)	96

== Release history ==
List of release dates and formats
Region	Date	Format	Label	Ref.
Various	7 September 2026	7-inch single	Human Re Sources	
Italy	8 September 2026	Radio airplay	Human Re Sources	
United States	22 September 2026	Contemporary hit radio	Human Re Sources	
