= Nightingale Lane =

Single by Raye

from the album This Music May Contain Hope.
- Released: 27 February 2026
- Genre: Orchestral jazz; British soul
- Length: 5:02
- Label: Human Re Sources
- Songwriters: Raye; Tom Richards; Chris Hill
- Producers: Raye; Richards; Hill

Raye singles chronology
"Where Is My Husband!" (2025)	"Nightingale Lane" (2026)	"Click Clack Symphony" (2026)

Live video
- "Nightingale Lane" on YouTube

"Nightingale Lane" (Note: Stylised as "Nightingale Lane." (with a full stop).) is a song by the British singer-songwriter Raye. It was released through Human Re Sources on 27 February 2026, as the second single from her second studio album, This Music May Contain Hope. (2026). The release of "Nightingale Lane" was accompanied by a live video of Raye performing at Abbey Road Studios and was further promoted with a performance at the 2026 Brit Awards. Commercially, the song reached the top twenty in the United Kingdom and appeared on charts in Ireland, and the Netherlands.

== Composition ==
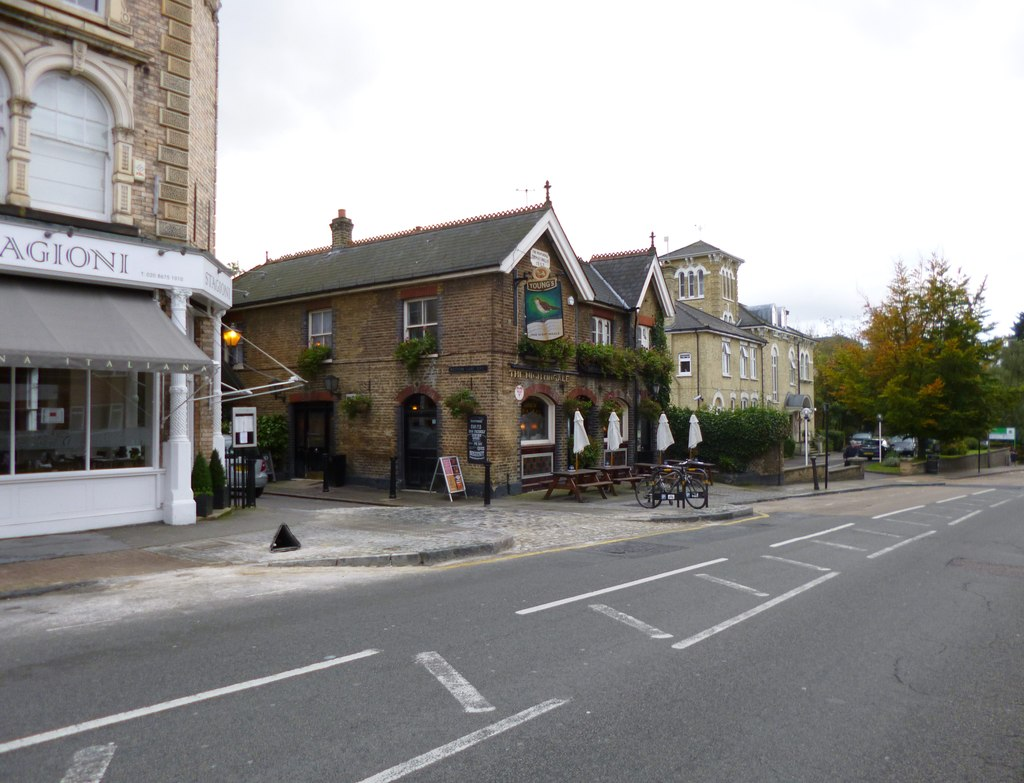
The Nightingale pub in Balham, the inspiration for the song

Raye wrote the song with Tom Richards and Chris Hill and co-produced it with Richards; she begins it with lines about "the greatest heartbreak I've ever known". She herself points to "Nightingale Lane" originating from a pub named The Nightingale located in Balham, South London often frequented by her former lover that inspired it; an unofficial light-hearted plaque remniscent of the historical landmark blue plaques commemorating the background dated to 2019 was set on the pub's walls in March 2026.

== Reception ==
"Nightingale Lane" debuted at number 20 on the UK Singles Chart dated 6 March 2026, following Raye's performance of the song at the Brit Awards. It became Raye's eleventh top-twenty hit on the chart.

In a positive review, Robin Murray of Clash wrote that the song lyrically "is one of her most incisive, and open moments to date and that's saying something" while pointing out that "Raye wears her heart explicitly on her sleeve". About the song's composition, he said "there are hints of jazz standards "A Nightingale Sang On Berkeley Square" in its DNA, but she transplants this to the South London suburbs".

== Promotion ==
The live music video for the song, directed by Becky Garner, was released on 27 February 2026 through the singer's YouTube channel. The video shows the singer performing with The Flames Collective and the London Symphony Orchestra at Abbey Road Studios in London, England. Raye performed the song at the Brit Awards 2026 in a medley with "Where Is My Husband!". Raye also performed the song during her debut at the 2026 BET Awards.

== Track listing ==
Digital single

1. "Nightingale Lane" – 5:02

7" single

1. "Nightingale Lane" – 5:02
2. "Nightingale Lane" (Live Abbey Road)

== Charts ==
Chart performance for "Nightingale Lane"
Chart (2026)	Peak position
Ireland (IRMA)	61
Netherlands (Single Top 100)	82
New Zealand Hot Singles (RMNZ)	8
UK Singles (Official Charts)	20
UK Indie (Official Charts)	4
UK Hip Hop/R&B (Official Charts)	2

== Release history ==
Release dates and formats for "Nightingale Lane"
Region	Date	Format(s)	Label(s)	Ref.
Various	27 February 2026	7-inch single; digital download; streaming	Human Re Sources	
Italy	2 March 2026	Radio airplay	Human Re Sources	
