= Joe Webb (pianist) =

Welsh jazz pianist and composer

- Born: Basingstoke, Hampshire, England
- Origin: Neath, Wales
- Genres: Jazz
- Occupations: Musician, composer, educator
- Instruments: Piano, Hammond organ
- Years active: 2010s–present
- Labels: Edition Records, Ubuntu Music

Joe Webb is a Welsh jazz pianist, composer and educator based in London. He leads the Joe Webb Trio, whose album Hamstrings & Hurricanes (2024) was shortlisted for the Mercury Prize.

== Early life and education ==
Webb was born in Basingstoke and grew up in Neath, South Wales. He began playing piano at the age of 12 and studied at the Royal Welsh College of Music & Drama before moving to London in 2013.

== Career ==
After relocating to London, Webb became active on the city's jazz circuit and performed at venues including Ronnie Scott's Jazz Club. He has performed with the London jazz collective Kansas Smitty's House Band.

Webb leads a trio with bassist Will Sach and drummer Sam Jesson. In 2022 he released the album Summer Chill. In 2024 the trio released the EPs Collblanc and SET on Edition Records. In October 2024 the trio released the album Hamstrings & Hurricanes, shortlisted for the 2025 Mercury Prize.

The Royal Academy of Music announced in 2025 that Webb had joined its faculty as a jazz professor. He has toured with Jamie Cullum and Jools Holland.

== Musical style ==
In an interview with NME, Webb described drawing on influences including 1990s Britpop alongside jazz traditions. All About Jazz noted the album’s incorporation of stride piano and ragtime alongside modern influences.

== Discography ==
=== As leader ===
- Daydreamer (EP, 2019)
- For Everything Else (EP, 2020)
- Summer Chill (2022)
- Collblanc (EP, 2024)
- SET (EP, 2024)
- Hamstrings & Hurricanes (2024)

== Awards and nominations ==
Year	Award	Category	Nominated work	Result
2025	Mercury Prize	Album of the Year	Hamstrings & Hurricanes	Shortlisted
