= Suzanne (Mark Ronson and Raye song) =

2025 single by Mark Ronson and Raye

Single by Mark Ronson and Raye
- Released: 13 June 2025
- Genre: Soul
- Length: 3:55; 3:31 (radio edit)
- Label: Sony UK
- Songwriters: Mark Ronson; Rachel Keen; Tommy Brenneck; Eric Hagstrom
- Producers: Mark Ronson; Tommy Brenneck

Mark Ronson singles chronology
"Can't Help Falling in Love" (2022)	"Suzanne" (2025)

Raye singles chronology
"Born Again" (2025)	"Suzanne" (2025)	"Where Is My Husband!" (2025)

Music video
- "Suzanne" on YouTube

"Suzanne" is a song by the British musician Mark Ronson and the British singer-songwriter Raye. It was released through Sony Music UK on 13 June 2025, marking the first collaboration between the two artists. Ronson produced the song with Tommy Brenneck, and both wrote it with Raye and Eric Hagstrom. Commercially, "Suzanne" peaked at number 34 on the UK singles chart.

== Background and release ==
The Swiss luxury watchmaker Audemars Piguet invited their ambassadors Mark Ronson and Raye to participate in the "APxMusic" programme, as part of the 150th anniversary of the brand's creation. Both artists stated that they had admired each other's works for several years, and Ronson said that he felt "the stars aligning at exactly the right moment" when they united. They started working on the song "Suzanne" in parallel to the track "Grandma Calls the Boy Bad News" from F1 the Album, the soundtrack album to the 2025 film F1.

Raye stated that she was "quite nervous and scared" for the song's reception after persistent comparisons with the English singer and songwriter Amy Winehouse, with whom Ronson worked with on Back to Black (2006) and "Valerie" (2007). Raye later chose to "forget what anyone else is gonna say", and expressed her long-term admiration for Winehouse. "Suzanne" was released on 13 June 2025 through Sony Music UK, after a series of teasers the days prior. It was accompanied by a music video, which follow the artists working in the studio and performing the song in different locations.

== Composition ==
"Suzanne" was written by Ronson, Raye, Tommy Brenneck, and Eric Hagstrom, and produced by Ronson and Brenneck. Music critics classified it as a soul song with the jazz sound of Raye's vocal performance. "Suzanne" was titled after a woman described throughout the song, who serves as its muse and center theme: "Grey skies out the window, but she's a summer breeze / Come and set the tone, I dare, come and sit down next to me, Suzanne". When presenting the track to Audemars Piguet, they learned that a woman named Suzanne Audemars was a descendant of the brand's founding families. Uproxx's critic Aaron Williams interpreted that the description could also be referencing the English countryside. Ronson compared the song to "hanging out with your first crush on a summer day", and described it as "slightly melancholy, but still joyous".

== Commercial performance ==
"Suzanne" debuted at number 34 on the UK Singles Chart dated 20 June 2025, earning Ronson and Raye their twelfth and eighteenth top 40 hits on the chart respectively.

== Charts ==
=== Weekly charts ===
Weekly chart performance for "Suzanne"
Chart (2025–2026)	Peak position
Argentina Anglo Airplay (Monitor Latino)	10
Australia Hip Hop/R&B (ARIA)	31
Bolivia Anglo Airplay (Monitor Latino)	7
Croatia International Airplay (Top lista)	47
Estonia Airplay (TopHit)	87
Israel International Airplay (Media Forest)	17
Japan Hot Overseas (Billboard Japan)	2
Lithuania Airplay (TopHit)	64
Netherlands (Single Tip)	24
New Zealand Hot Singles (RMNZ)	11
North Macedonia Airplay (Radiomonitor)	8
Paraguay Anglo Airplay (Monitor Latino)	9
Portugal Airplay (AFP)	33
Serbia Airplay (Radiomonitor)	20
UK Singles (Official Charts)	34
Uruguay Anglo Airplay (Monitor Latino)	10

=== Monthly charts ===
Monthly chart performance for "Suzanne"
Chart (2025)	Peak position
Estonia Airplay (TopHit)	98

== Certifications ==
Certifications
Region	Certification	Certified units/sales
United Kingdom (BPI)	Silver	200,000^{‡}
^{‡} Sales+streaming figures based on certification alone.
