= 69th Annual Grammy Awards =

2027 US music awards ceremony

- Date: February 7, 2027
- Location: Crypto.com Arena; Los Angeles, California

Highlights
- Most nominations: Raye (11)
- Website: grammy.com

Television/radio coverage
- Network: ABC; Disney+ Hulu

The 69th Annual Grammy Awards are an upcoming music awards ceremony that will honor the best recordings, compositions, and artists released or active during the eligibility period from August 31, 2025, to August 28, 2026, as determined by members of the Recording Academy. The ceremony is scheduled to take place on February 7, 2027, at the Crypto.com Arena in Los Angeles, California. It will be the 24th Grammy ceremony held at the venue. A host has yet to be announced.

The ceremony will be the first Grammy Awards to be broadcast on ABC since the 14th ceremony in 1972, as well as the first to be streamed on Disney+ and Hulu, following a new ten-year agreement between the Recording Academy and the Walt Disney Company announced on October 30, 2024. It follows the 68th Annual Grammy Awards, which were the final Grammy ceremony to be broadcast on CBS.

== Background ==
On June 16, 2026, the Recording Academy announced several changes to the categories and eligibility rules for the 2027 ceremony.

=== Category changes ===
- Four new categories – Best Asian Pop Music Performance, Best R&B Collaboration or Duo/Group Performance, Best Traditional Pop Vocal Performance, and Best Latin Song.
- Best Folk Album was renamed Best Contemporary Folk Album. Best Traditional Folk Album is making a comeback for the first time since 2011.
- Best R&B Performance was renamed Best R&B Solo Performance.

=== Criteria amendments ===
- Artists are now permitted to submit themselves up for four times for consideration in the Best New Artist category, an increase from the previous limit of three. Once an artist achieves a nomination, receives a nomination in any other Grammy category, or if they submit four times and are not nominated for Best New Artist, they are considered ineligible.
- The threshold of new recordings required for an album to be eligible for that year's Grammy awards is reduced from 75% to 66%.
- Internet-only releases are now eligible in the Best Album Notes and Best Historical Album categories.
- Songwriters and composers of new material on winning albums in the genre categories will now receive an award in parity with the recognition currently awarded to producers and engineers.
- Minor description updates to the Best Contemporary Classical Composition, Best Musical Theater Album, Best Country Song, Best Country Solo Performance, Best Country Duo/Group Performance, Best Bluegrass Album, Best Children's Music Album, Best Alternative Music Performance, Best Alternative Music Album, and Best Regional Roots Music Album categories.

=== Voting amendments ===
- In previous years, all Academy members have voted in the six general field categories plus an additional ten categories across no more than three genre fields. As of the 2027 ceremony, some members have the option to vote in fifteen categories across all genre fields instead based on their own professional credits and contributions to the music industry. The Academy advise that members who request the latter voting ballot will need to meet certain criteria.

== Nominees ==
The nominations were announced on November 16, 2026.

=== General Field ===
General Field
Record of the Year: "Man I Need" – Olivia Dean; Zach Nahome, producer; Charlie Holmes & Zach Nahome, engineers/mixers; Simon Francis, mastering engineer; "Choosin' Texas" – Ella Langley; Miranda Lambert, Ella Langley & Ben West, producers; Dave Clauss & Ben West, engineers/mixers; Pete Lyman, mastering engineer; "I Just Might" – Bruno Mars; D'Mile & Bruno Mars, producers; Bryce Bordone, Serban Ghenea, Anthony Masino, Charles Moniz & Gabriel Roth, engineers/mixers; Randy Merrill, mastering engineer; "Where Is My Husband!" – Raye; Raye & Mike Sabath, producers; Tony Maserati, Raye, Hal Ristion & Alex Robinson, engineers/mixers; Dale Becker, mastering engineer; "The Cure" – Olivia Rodrigo; Dan Nigro, producer; Chris Kasych, Mitch McCarthy & Dan Nigro, engineers/mixers; Mike Bozzi, mastering engineer; "Berghain" – Rosalía, Björk & Yves Tumor; Noah Goldstein, Jake Miller, David Rodriguez, Rosalía & Dylan Wiggins, producers; Daniel Cayotte, Isaac Diskin, Tristan Hoogland, Manny Marroquin, Jake Miller, Billy Ray, David Rodríguez, Marta Salogni, Bergur Thorsson & Harry Wilson, engineers/mixers, Bob Jackson & Brian Lee, mastering engineer; "The Fate of Ophelia" – Taylor Swift; Max Martin, Shellback & Taylor Swift, producers; Serban Ghenea & Lasse Mårtén, engineers/mixers; Randy Merrill, mastering engineer; "Dracula" – Tame Impala & Jennie; Sarah Aarons & Kevin Parker, producers; Eric J. Dubowsky, Jung Eun-kyung & Kevin Parker, engineers/mixers; Matt Colton, mastering engineer
Album of the Year: Lost Weekend – Phoebe Bridgers; Jack Antonoff, Tony Berg, Phoebe Bridgers & Ethan Gruska, producers; Jack Antonoff, Sam Gazarian, Cam Gilfoy, Oli Jacobs, Will Maclellan, Jack Manning, Kellie McGrew, Joey Miller, Mike Mogis, Rob Moose, Dani Perez, Laura Sisk, Gregg White, engineers/mixers; Phoebe Bridgers, Bo Burnham, Christian Lee Hutson, Marshall Vore, songwriters; Ruairí O'Flaherty, mastering engineer; The Art of Loving – Olivia Dean; Julian Bunetta, Bastian Langebæk, Zach Nahome, John Ryan & Max Wolfgang, producers; Jeff Gunell, Charlie Holmes & Zach Nahome, engineers/mixers; Olivia Dean, Matt Hales, Bastian Langebæk, Max Wolfgang, songwriters; Simon Francis, mastering engineer; Dandelion – Ella Langley; Austin Goodloe, Miranda Lambert, Ella Langley & Ben West, producers; Chuck Ainlay, Dave Clauss, Austin Goodloe, Mike Stankiewicz & Ben West, engineers/mixers; Ella Langley & Joybeth Taylor, songwriters; Andrew Mendelson, mastering engineer; The Romantic – Bruno Mars; D'Mile & Bruno Mars, producers; Bryce Bordone, Jeff Chestek, Serban Ghenea, Anthony Masino, Charles Moniz & Gabriel Roth, engineers/mixers; Brody Brown, D'Mile, James Fauntleroy, Philip Lawrence & Bruno Mars, songwriters; Randy Merrill, mastering engineer; This Music May Contain Hope – Raye; Pete Clements, Chris Hill, Rachel Keen, Tom Richards & Mike Sabath, producers; Jon Castelli, Andrew Dudman, Tony Maserati, Rachel Keen & Alex Robinson, engineers/mixers; Graeme Blevins, Matt Brooks, Pete Clements, Augie Haas, Chris Hill, Paul Murray, Rachel Keen, Tom Richards, Mike Sabath & Oscar Stieler, songwriters; Mike Hillier, mastering engineer; You Seem Pretty Sad for a Girl So in Love – Olivia Rodrigo; Dan Nigro, producer; Chris Kasych, Mitch McCarthy & Dan Nigro, engineers/mixers; Amy Allen, Dan Nigro & Olivia Rodrigo, songwriters; Mike Bozzi & Randy Merrill, mastering engineer; Lux (Complete Works) – Rosalía; Noah Goldstein, Elliott Kozel, David Rodríguez, Rosalía & Dylan Wiggins, producers; Daniel Cayotte, Isaac Diskin, Tom Elmhirst, Tristan Hoogland, Manny Marroquin, Jake Miller, David Rodríguez & Harry Wilson, engineers/mixers; Noah Goldstein, Elliott Kozel, Jake Miller, David Rodríguez, Rosalía Vila Tobella & Dylan Wiggins, songwriters; Bob Jackson & Brian Lee, mastering engineers; The Life of a Showgirl – Taylor Swift; Max Martin, Shellback & Taylor Swift, producers; Erik Arvinder, Willem Bleeker, Mattias Bylund, Serban Ghenea, Lasse Mårtén, Max Martin & Shellback, engineers/mixers; Max Martin, Shellback & Taylor Swift, songwriters; Randy Merrill, mastering engineer
Song of the Year: "Berghain"; Björk Guðmundsdóttir, Noah Goldstein, Jake Miller, Rosalia Vila Tobella & Dylan Wiggins, songwriters (Rosalia, Björk & Yves Tumor); "Choosin' Texas"; Luke Dick, Miranda Lambert, Ella Langley, & Joybeth Taylor, songwriters (Ella Langley); "The Cure"; Dan Nigro & Olivia Rodrigo, songwriters (Olivia Rodrigo); "Hate That I Made You Love Me"; Ariana Grande, Max Martin & Ilya Salmanzadeh, songwriters (Ariana Grande); "I Knew It, I Knew You" (from Toy Story 5); Jack Antonoff & Taylor Swift, songwriters (Taylor Swift); "Man I Need"; Olivia Dean, Tobias Jesso Jr. & Zach Nahome, songwriters (Olivia Dean); "Risk It All"; Dernst Emile II, James Fauntleroy, Philip Lawrence & Bruno Mars, songwriters (Bruno Mars); "Where Is My Husband!"; Raye & Mike Sabath, songwriters (Raye)
Best New Artist: Angine de Poitrine; Geese; Ella Langley; Slayyyter; Sienna Spiro; Don Toliver; Remi Wolf; The Womack Sisters
Producer of the Year, Non-Classical: Tony Berg; 1. Better Broken (Sarah McLachlan) (A); 2. "Homewrecker" (Sombr) (S); 3. Indigo Park (Bruce Hornsby) (A); 4. Lost Weekend (Phoebe Bridgers) (A); 5. "My Body Isn't Ready" (Sombr) (S); 6. "Potential" (Sombr) (S); D'Mile; 1. "Reach Out" (Victoria Monét) (S); 2. The Romantic (Bruno Mars) (A); Noah Goldstein; 1. Lux (Rosalía) (A); Miranda Lambert; 1. Dandelion (Ella Langley) (A); Mike Sabath; 1. "Beware.. The South London Lover Boy" (Raye) (T); 2. "Click Clack Symphony" (Raye featuring Hans Zimmer) (S); 3. "Fields" (Raye featuring Grandad Michael) (T); 4. "I Will Overcome" (Raye) (T); 5. "Joy" (Raye featuring Amma and Absolutely) (T); 6. "Skin and Bones" (Raye) (T); 7. "The WhatsApp Shakespeare" (Raye) (T); 8. "Where Is My Husband!" (Raye) (S); 9. "Winter Woman" (Raye) (T)	Songwriter of the Year, Non-Classical: Amy Allen; 1. "Cry Ugly" (Flo) (S); 2. "Dashboard" (Noah Kahan) (T); 3. "Drop Dead" (Olivia Rodrigo) (S); 4. "Expectations" (Olivia Rodrigo) (T); 5. "For Always" (Ed Sheeran) (T); 6. "Likey Likey" (Young Miko) (S); 7. "So Easy (To Fall in Love)" (Olivia Dean) (S); 8. "Stupid" (Megan Moroney) (T); 9. "Virtuoso" (Ryan Beatty) (S); Edgar Barrera; 1. "Broke My Heart" (Gracie Abrams) (T); 2. "Dando Vueltas" (Rauw Alejandro) (S); 3. "Después de Ti" (Karol G & Greg Gonzalez) (S); 4. "For U My Lova" (Karol G) (T); 5. "Lighter" (Santana and Grupo Frontera) (S); Raye; 1. "Click Clack Symphony" (Raye featuring Hans Zimmer) (S); 2. "God Be My Witness" (Amma) (T); 3. "I Know You're Hurting" (Raye) (T); 4. "Joy" (Raye, Amma, Absolutely) (T); 5. "Know About Me" (Halle Bailey, GloRilla) (T); 6. "Let Me Be In Your Arms" (Sonny Fodera, Libianca) (S); 7. "Supermarket" (Say Now) (S); 8. "The WhatsApp Shakespeare" (Raye) (T); 9. "Where Is My Husband!" (Raye) (S); Joybeth Taylor; 1. "Choosin' Texas" (Ella Langley) (S); 2. "Empty Words" (Corey Kent) (S); 3. "I Can't Love You Anymore" (Ella Langley, Morgan Wallen) (S); 4. "Winner at Losing – Landman – Songs From and Inspired by the Paramount+ Original Series (Volume II)" (Gavin Adcock) (S); Theron Thomas; 1. "Ain't in LA" (Adéla) (S); 2. "Be Good" (Buju Banton) (T); 3. "Champion" (Blackpink) (T); 4. "Does She Know" (Sekou) (T); 5. "Eurosummer – Girls Trip" (Zara Larsson & Shakira) (T); 6. "FLAMED UP" (JayDon) (S); 7. "Me and My" (Blackpink) (T); 8. "Sexy Ladies" (Lizzo & UCB) (T); 9. "Too Easy" (Tig3r Lewis) (S)

=== Pop & Dance/Electronic ===
Pop & Dance/Electronic Field
Best Pop Solo Performance: "Man I Need" – Olivia Dean; "Risk It All" – Bruno Mars; "Where Is My Husband!" – Raye; "The Cure" – Olivia Rodrigo; "Sauvignon Blanc" – Rosalía	Best Pop Duo/Group Performance: "Runway" – Lady Gaga & Doechii; "Bring Your Love" – Madonna & Sabrina Carpenter; "Click Clack Symphony." – Raye featuring Hans Zimmer; "The Life of a Showgirl" – Taylor Swift featuring Sabrina Carpenter; "Dracula" – Tame Impala & Jennie
Best Asian Pop Music Performance: "Sunset Kiss" – Babymetal, Polyphia; "Unang Kilig" – Bini; "Bang Bang" – Ive; "404 (New Era)" – KiiiKiii; "Yes" – LiSA; "Visa" – SB19	Best Pop Vocal Album: The Art of Loving – Olivia Dean; Petal – Ariana Grande; The Romantic – Bruno Mars; This Music May Contain Hope – Raye; You Seem Pretty Sad for a Girl So in Love – Olivia Rodrigo
Best Dance/Electronic Album: Confessions II – Madonna; Sexistential – Robyn; Soma – Skrillex; Worst Girl in America – Slayyyter; Deadbeat – Tame Impala	Best Dance Pop Recording: "Blue Moon" – Zara Larsson; Zhone, Margo XS & Uzoechi Emenike, producers; Tom Norris, mixer; "Danceteria" – Madonna; Cirkut, Madonna, Stuart Price & Andrew Watt, producers; Stuart Price, mixer; "Life Boat" – Raye; Punctual, Raye & Jordan Riley, producer; Jon Castelli, mixer; "Dance..." – Slayyyter; Valley Girl, producer; Clint Gibbs, mixer; "Too Easy" – Tinashe; Zack Sekoff & Kimj, producers; Tom Norris, mixer
Best Dance/Electronic Recording: "Lights Burn Dimmer" – Fred again... featuring Jamie T; Fred again..., producer; Tom Norris, mixer; "I Feel So Free" – Madonna; Madonna & Stuart Price, producers; Stuart Price, mixer; "Crank" – Slayyyter; Austin Corona & Wyatt Bernard, producers; Clint Gibbs, mixer; "My Old Ways" – Tame Impala; Kevin Parker, producer; Kevin Parker, mixer; "Melatonin" – Tinashe; Zack Sekoff, Nightfeelings & Ricky Reed, producers; Tom Norris, mixing; "Music" – Underscores; Underscores, producers; Underscores, mixing	Best Remixed Recording, Non-Classical: "Beto's Horns" (fred Remix) – Fred again... & Tom Norris, remixers (Fred again..., Ca7riel & Paco Amoroso); "I Just Might" (Austin Millz Remix) – Austin Millz, remixer (Bruno Mars); "Love Sensation" (Jacques Lu Cont Remix) – Stuart Price, remixer (Madonna & Kylie Minogue); "Opalite" (Chris Lake Remix) – Chris Lake, remixer (Taylor Swift); "A Question of Trust" (Boys Noize Remix) – Boyz Noize, remixer (Nine Inch Nails & Boys Noize); "Where Is My Husband!" (David Guetta & Hypaton Remix) – David Guetta & Hypaton, remixers (Raye, David Guetta & Hypaton)

=== Rock, Metal & Alternative ===
Rock, Metal & Alternative Field
Best Rock Performance: "Sarniezz" – Angine de Poitrine; "Lost Boys" – Phoebe Bridgers; "Trinidad" – Geese; "What's Wrong with Me" – Olivia Rodrigo & Robert Smith; "In the Stars" – The Rolling Stones	Best Metal Performance: "The Edge of Perfection" – Anthrax; "Hive Mind" – Knocked Loose featuring Denzel Curry; "Your Ghost Again" – Mastodon; "Let There Be Shred" – Megadeth; "End of You" – Poppy, Amy Lee & Courtney LaPlante
Best Rock Song: "In the Stars" – Mick Jagger & Keith Richards, songwriters (The Rolling Stones); "Lost Boys" – Phoebe Bridgers, Bo Burnham, Alex G, Christian Lee Hutson & Marshall Vore, songwriters (Phoebe Bridgers); "My Only Angel" – Joe Perry, Matt Schwartz, Steven Tyler & Yungblud (Aerosmith & Yungblud); "Streets of Minneapolis – Radio Mix" – Bruce Springsteen, songwriter (Bruce Springsteen); "Trinidad" – Max Bassin, Dominic DiGesu, Emily Green & Cameron Winter, songwriters (Geese); "What's Wrong with Me" – Dan Nigro, Olivia Rodrigo & Sasha Sloan, songwriters (Olivia Rodrigo & Robert Smith); "Your Favorite Toy" – Foo Fighters, songwriters (Foo Fighters)	Best Rock Album: Vol. II – Angine de Poitrine; Your Favorite Toy – Foo Fighters; The Wow! Signal – Muse; Foreign Tongues – The Rolling Stones; Frozen Charlotte – Jack White
Best Alternative Music Performance: "Fabienk" – Angine de Poitrine; "Au Pays Du Cocaine" – Geese; "Showbiz" – Hayley Williams; "Kill Me" – Phoebe Bridgers; "Reliquia" – Rosalía	Best Alternative Music Album: I Must Be Dreaming – Alabama Shakes; Lost Weekend – Phoebe Bridgers; Music, Fashion, Film – Charli XCX; Getting Killed – Geese; The Mountain – Gorillaz; Lux (Complete Works) – Rosalía

=== R&B, Rap & Spoken Word Poetry ===
R&B, Rap and Spoken Word Poetry Field
Best R&B Solo Performance: "Morning Dew (Donk)" – Beyoncé; "Out the Window" – Kehlani; "Let Me" – Victoria Monét; "Pressha" – Jill Scott; "What You Need" – Tems	Best Traditional R&B Performance: "I Found Myself" – Durand Bernarr; "Can’t Let Go" – Lalah Hathaway; "Beautiful People" – Jill Scott; "My Muse" – Leon Thomas; "If I Let You" – The Womack Sisters
Best R&B Collaboration or Duo/Group Performance: "Fallin'" – Chris Brown featuring Leon Thomas; "47th Street" – Lalah Hathaway featuring J. Ivy; "Sweet Nuthins" – Kehlani featuring Leon Thomas; "Mess" – PJ Morton featuring Keyon Harrold; "To B Honest" – Jill Scott featuring JID	Best R&B Song: "Let Me" – Jahshua Brown, Darhyl Camper, Jr., Jeff Gitelman, Tiyon Mack, Victoria Monét & Branden Rowell, songwriters (Victoria Monét); "My Muse" – Lazaro Camejo, Rob Gueringer, Nile Eugene Hargrove, Peter Lee Johnson, Marcus Clayton Paul, David Kenneth Phelps & Leon Thomas, songwriters (Leon Thomas); "Out the Window" – Antonio Lamar Dixon, Ashton Norful, Kehlani Parrish, Khristopher Riddick-Tynes, Talay Riley, songwriters (Kehlani); "Pressha" – Adam Blackstone, Jill Scott & Vincent Tolan, songwriters (Jill Scott); "What You Need" – Temilade Openiyi, songwriters (Tems)
Best R&B Album: Brown (Chocolate Edition) – Chris Brown; When the City Sleeps – Alex Isley; Kehlani – Kehlani; Saturday Night – PJ Morton; To Whom This May Concern – Jill Scott	Best Progressive R&B Album: Bernarr – Durand Bernarr; Waves – Moonchild; The Last Balloon – Tank and the Bangas; Pholks – Leon Thomas; Distracted – Thundercat
Best Rap Performance: "Good Flirts" – Baby Keem featuring Kendrick Lamar & Momo Boyd; "ErrTime" – Cardi B; "Run It Back!!" – De La Soul, Nas; "Body" – Don Toliver; "Let 'Em Know" – T.I.	Best Melodic Rap Performance: "This Woman" – Busta Rhymes, J Dilla & D'Angelo; "Safe" – Cardi B featuring Kehlani; "Girl, Get Up" – Doechii featuring SZA; "E85" – Don Toliver; "Watching Us" – Wale featuring Leon Thomas
Best Rap Song: "E85" – Caleb Toliver, Jacques Webster II, Aaron Cheung, Derek Anderson, Jaasu Mallory, Malcolm Hobert, Charles Ziman, Jonah Cochran, songwriters (Don Toliver); "ErrTime" – Matthew Allen, Javaan Anderson, Belcalis Almanzar, James Steed, Jorden Thorpe, songwriters (Cardi B); "Girl, Get Up" – Darius Scott, Jaylah Hickmon, Jahlil Gunter, Solána Rowe, Anthony "Moosa" Tiffith Jr. & Anthony "Top Dawg" Tiffith, songwriters, songwriters (Doechii featuring SZA); "Let 'Em Know" – Clifford Joseph Harris Jr. & Pharrell Williams, songwriters (T.I.); "Spend Dat" – Caresha Romeka Brownlee, Akil King, Maurice Simmonds & Anthony Germaine White, songwriters (Yung Miami)	Best Rap Album: Dillagence II – Busta Rhymes & J Dilla; Am I the Drama? – Cardi B; God Gotta Afro & Gold Hoops – Rapsody; Octane – Don Toliver; Everything Is a Lot. – Wale; Bully (Deluxe) – Kanye West
Best Spoken Word Poetry Album: Black Shaman Strikes Back – Marc Marcel; The Color of Rain – Aja Monet; A Hero and a Villain – Mad Skillz; How Love Grows – Jwalt & ClayDough; Leap Life – Saul Williams

=== Jazz, Traditional Pop, Contemporary Instrumental & Musical Theater ===
Jazz, Traditional Pop, Contemporary Instrumental & Musical Theater Field
Best Jazz Performance: "In Walked Bud" – Jon Batiste; "Good Life – TAMRON HALL Main Title Theme" – The Baylor Project; "Sophisticated Lady" – Cécile McLorin Salvant, Metropole Orkest, Jules Buckley; "The Lady is a Tramp" – Deborah Silver, Diane Schuur; "i get along without you very well (except sometimes)" – Nicole Zuraitis, Christian McBride, Gilad Hekselman, Dan Pugach	Best Jazz Vocal Album: For Dinah – Ledisi; The Wise Ones – Gretchen Parlato; Live At Jazz At Lincoln Center – Catherine Russell; With Every Breath I Take – Cécile McLorin Salvant, Metropole Orkest, Jules Buckley; the devil i knew – Nicole Zuraitis
Best Jazz Instrumental Album: Monk Meditations – Jon Batiste; We Dream – Lakecia Benjamin; Forever Yours: The Farewell Performance (Live) – Chick Corea; Leave That In There – Sullivan Fortner; Side-Eye III+ – Pat Metheny	Best Large Jazz Ensemble Album: Paco de Lucía, Music for the Big Band (Live) – Alex Conde; In The Brass Palace – Kurt Elling & WDR Big Band; Jim McNeely Expeditions – Frankfurt Radio Big Band & Jim McNeely; 25 Years of Phatness – Gordon Goodwin's Big Phat Band & Gordon Goodwin; Oracles – Helen Sung
Best Latin Jazz Album: Filin – Melissa Aldana; Ao Vivo (Live) – Eliane Elias; Monk Con Clave – Carlos Henriquez, Gonzalo Rubalcaba, Pedro Martinez, Anthony Almonte, Osmany Paredes, Jeremy Bosch & Robert Rodriguez; GONZALO Plays PINO – Gonzalo Rubalcaba; El Arte Del Bolero Vol. 3 – Miguel Zenón & Luis Perdomo	Best Alternative Jazz Album: Trip the Night Fantastic – Terri Lyne Carrington; Who Asked? – DOMi & JD Beck; Purpose – Terrace Martin, Marcus Gilmore; Oh Snap – Cécile McLorin Salvant; Fathers – Nate Smith, Kiefer, Carrtoons & Kenny Beats
Best Traditional Pop Vocal Album: Good Grief – Sara Bareilles; The Boys of Dungeon Lane – Paul McCartney; Better Broken – Sarah McLachlan; An Offering: Live at Speakeasy Studios – Leslie Odom Jr.; Whatever's Clever! – Charlie Puth	Best Traditional Pop Vocal Performance: "A Couple Minutes" — Olivia Dean; "For Good" – Cynthia Erivo & Ariana Grande; "Madwoman" – Laufey; "I Hate the Way I Look Today." – Raye; "All That's Left" – Nicole Zuraitis & Gilad Hekselman
Best Contemporary Instrumental Album: Monk Meditations – Jon Batiste; Lullaby for the Lost – Donny McCaslin; A Six String Odyssey – Six String Symphony; Somni – Snarky Puppy, Metropole Orkest, Jules Buckley; BaRcoDe – Ben Wendel	Best Musical Theater Album: Chess The Musical – Nicholas Christopher, Hannah Cruz, Bradley Dean, Lea Michele, Bryce Pinkham & Aaron Tveit, principal vocalists; Benny Andersson, Ludvig Andersson & Brian Usifer, producers (Benny Andersson & Björn Ulvaeus, composers; Tim Rice, lyricist) (2025 Broadway Cast); The Lost Boys – Shoshana Bean, Lj Benet, Ali Louis Bourzgui, Paul Alexander Nolan, Benjamin Pajak & Maria Wirries, principal vocalists; Kyler England, Adrianne Gonzalez, Ethan Popp & Gabriel Mann, producers; Kyler England, Adrianne Gonzalez & Gabriel Mann, composers/lyricists (Original Broadway Cast); Ragtime – Colin Donnell, Joshua Henry, Caissie Levy, Nichelle Lewis, Ben Levi Ross & Brandon Uranowitz, principal vocalists; Lynn Ahrens, Sean Patrick Flahaven & Stephen Flaherty, producers (Stephen Flaherty, composer; Lynn Ahrens, lyricist) (2025 Broadway Cast); Schmigadoon! – Alex Brightman, Sara Chase & Ana Gasteyer, principal vocalists; Doug Besterman, David Chase, Cinco Paul & Scott M. Riesett, producers: Cinco Paul, lyricist/composer (Schmigadoon: Original Broadway Company); Two Strangers (Carry A Cake Across New York) – Christiani Pitts & Sam Tutty, principal vocalists; Jim Barne, Nick Finlow, Tim Jackson & Lux Pyramid, producers; Jim Barne, composer; Kit Buchan, lyricist (Original Broadway Cast)

=== Country & American Roots ===
Country & American Roots Field
Best Country Solo Performance: "The Whole World" – Vince Gill; "Choosin' Texas" – Ella Langley; "Dry Spell" —Kacey Musgraves; "Can’t Sit Still" – Lainey Wilson; "Gary" – Stephen Wilson Jr.	Best Country Duo/Group Performance: "Butterfly" – Zac Brown Band featuring Dolly Parton; "Here" – Mumford & Sons featuring Chris Stapleton; "Horses and Divorces" – Kacey Musgraves featuring Miranda Lambert; "Light of a Clear Blue Morning" – Dolly Parton featuring Lainey Wilson, Miley Cyrus, Queen Latifah & Reba McEntire; "Phone, Keys, Wallet" – Lainey Wilson & John Mayer
Best Contemporary Country Album: Mount Pleasant – Kelsea Ballerini; Cherry Valley – Carter Faith; Dandelion – Ella Langley; Cloud 9 – Megan Moroney; Middle of Nowhere – Kacey Musgraves	Best Traditional Country Album: Clovis – Charley Crockett; 50 Years From Home: Down At The Borderline – Vince Gill; Banks of the Trinity – Cody Johnson; Workin' Man: Willie Sings Merle – Willie Nelson; Once Upon a Second Time Around – Charlie Worsham
Best Country Song: "Beautiful Things" – Jessi Alexander, Jessie Jo Dillon, Connie Harrington & Megan Moroney, songwriters (Megan Moroney); "Choosin' Texas" – Luke Dick, Miranda Lambert, Ella Langley & Joybeth Taylor, songwriters (Ella Langley); "Dry Spell" – Luke Laird, Shane McAnally, Kacey Musgraves & Josh Osborne, songwriters (Kacey Musgraves); "Hardwired" – Black Francis, Jesse Frasure, Adam Hood, Miranda Lambert & Stephen Wilson Jr., songwriters (Stephen Wilson Jr.); "Phone, Keys, Wallet" – Trannie Anderson, Jon Decious, Kid Harpoon, Summer Overstreet, Dan Pellarin, Dallas Wilson & Lainey Wilson, songwriters (Lainey Wilson & John Mayer)	Best American Roots Song: "Masks Off" – Jesse Welles, songwriter (Jesse Welles); "My Full Name" – Madison Cunningham, songwriter (Madison Cunningham); "Returning to Myself" – Brandi Carlile, songwriter (Brandi Carlile); "Tennessee Sunshine" – Mary Dawood Catlin, Todd Catlin & Grant Maloy Smith, songwriters (Grant Maloy Smith); "Waist Deep" – Zac Cockrell, Heath Fogg & Brittany Howard, songwriters (Alabama Shakes)
Best American Roots Performance: "Still Crying" – Sara Bareilles; "You Without Me" – Brandi Carlile; "Coyote" – Chuck Leah; "Human Mind" – Mavis Staples; "No Kings" – Jesse Welles & Joan Baez	Best Americana Performance: "Heartland" – Sara Bareilles; "Returning to Myself" – Brandi Carlile; "Sad and Beautiful World" – Mavis Staples; "Mill Town Flood" – Billy Strings; "Masks Off" – Jesse Welles
Best Americana Album: Returning to Myself – Brandi Carlile; Sad and Beautiful World – Mavis Staples; Future Soul – Tedeschi Trucks Band; Masks Off – Jesse Welles; World's Gone Wrong – Lucinda Williams	Best Bluegrass Album: Rattlin' Bones – Bronwyn Keith-Hynes; Safe, Sensible and Sane – Alison Brown & Steve Martin; Bluegrass Women – Lindsay Lou; So Much for Goodbyes – Billy Strings; Earl Jam 2 – Tony Trischka
Best Traditional Blues Album: Zydeco Trailrides and Sudden Soul – Sean Ardoin and Kreole Rock and Soul & Mr. Sipp; B.B. King's Blues Summit 100 – Joe Bonamassa; Morgan Freeman's Symphonic Blues Experience – Ground Zero Blues Club Band & Chineke! Orchestra & Martin Gellner; BLUES NOW – GA-20 & Charlie Musselwhite; Slideways – Lil' Ed & The Blues Imperials	Best Contemporary Blues Album: Alive! (Live) – Fantastic Negrito; Paper Doll (Live) – Samantha Fish; Just Say Yes – Ruthie Foster; Hard Road – Christone "Kingfish" Ingram; The Breakdown – Keb' Mo'
Best Traditional Folk Album: The Fiddle and the Drum – Renée Fleming & Béla Fleck; North Node – Brittany Haas; The Fiddle Funnel Sessions – E J Ouellette; Together Again – Tom Paxton & John McCutcheon; Under the Powerlines III (January 2025 – June 2025) – Jesse Welles	Best Contemporary Folk Album: Le Sigh – Kris Angelis; Ace – Madison Cunningham; The Great Divide: The Last of the Bugs – Noah Kahan; Lost Cause Lover Fool – The Milk Carton Kids; Bloodline – Mon Rovîa
Best Regional Roots Music Album: Louisiana Love – Robin Barnes; Live at Tipitina's 2025 – Dumpstaphunk; This Village – Ranky Tanky; Ain't No Dying – The Rumble featuring Chief Joseph Boudreaux Jr.; Tongva Songs We Are Here Ekwa Chem – Tongva Ensemble & Connor Chee & Geneviève Gros-Louis

=== Gospel & Contemporary Christian ===
Gospel & Contemporary Christian Field
Best Gospel Performance/Song: "Thank You for Everything" – Kirk Franklin & Karen Clark Sheard; "Watches Over Me" – Cory Henry & Hezekiah Walker & The Brent Fischer Orchestra; "Promises 2.0" – Lisa Knowles-Smith & The Brown Singers; "Mercy" – PJ Morton; "At the Cross" – CeCe Winans	Best Contemporary Christian Music Performance/Song: "God I'm Just Grateful" – Elevation Worship & Chandler Moore & Ammo & Pat Barrett & Steven Furtick & Abubakar Baker Shariff-Farr; "Ale-luya Medley" – Israel & New Breed & Kevin Camp & Nate Diaz & Israel Houghton & Angel Omar Martinez & Aaron Moses; "The Jesus I Know Now" – Brandon Lake & Lainey Wilson & Luke Laird & Emily Weisband; "Living Water" – Lecrae & Miles Corayer & Jonah Glass & Lasanna Harris & Andrew "Lihtz" Howard & Joel McNeill & John McNeill; "Left It in the River" – Jamie MacDonald & Jonathan Gamble & Colby Wedgeworth; "Worthy of It All (Worthy)" – CeCe Winans
Best Gospel Album: Devotion – Cory Henry; Revival: Live in Dallas – Lisa Knowles-Smith & The Brown Singers; Closer (Live in Chicago) – Jonathan McReynolds; Sunday Morning – PJ Morton; The Hymns – CeCe Winans	Best Contemporary Christian Music Album: Shiloh – DOE; Coritos Vol. 2 – Israel & New Breed; King of Hearts – In the Room! – Brandon Lake; Jamie MacDonald – Jamie MacDonald; Breathe on It – Tauren Wells
Best Roots Gospel Album: Through the Fire – Jason Crabb; On a Different Note – Tim Lovelace; Light. Hope. Faith. – Cara Paige; A Fireside Christmas – Karen Peck & New River; Rise and Shine – Sunday Drive

=== Latin, Global, African, Reggae & New Age, Ambient or Chant ===
Latin, Global, African, Reggae & New Age, Ambient or Chant Field
Best Latin Pop Album: No Me Arrepiento de Sentir Tanto – Karol G; Femme Fatale – Mon Laferte; Muda – Carín León; ¿Dónde es el After? – Rawayana; Bendito Verano – Elena Rose	Best Música Urbana Album: Cosa Nuestra: Capítulo 0 – Rauw Alejandro; Omerta – J Balvin & Ryan Castro; Hopi Sendé – Ryan Castro; Omakase – Alvaro Diaz; El Green Print: La Saga (Disc 1) – Feid vs Ferxxo – Feid; Do Not Disturb: Late Checkout – Young Miko
Best Latin Rock or Alternative Album: Free Spirits – Ca7riel & Paco Amoroso; Taracá – Jorge Drexler; La Vida Era Más Corta – Milo J; JuanesTeban – Juanes; Shine – Fito Paez	Best Música Mexicana Album (including Tejano): Lo Que Me Falta Por Llorar – Grupo Frontera; Aunque Me Duela – Lupita Infante; La Madrina – Mari Nobre; Dinastía (Deluxe) – Peso Pluma & Tito Double P; ¡Vida México! – Carlos Rivera
Best Tropical Latin Album: País Portatil – Rubén Blades, Roberto Delgado & Orquesta; El Alma en Clave – Luis Enrique; Antes Que El Tiempo Se Vaya – Fonseca; Más Que Palabras – Grupo Niche; El Último Disco Vol. 1 – Carlos Vives	Best Latin Song: "Ahí" – Aubrey Drake Graham, Carolina Giraldo Navarro, Kevyn Mauricio Cruz Moreno & Daniel Echavarría Oviedo, songwriters (Karol G & Drake); "¿Cómo se Ama?" – Jorge Drexler, songwriter (Jorge Drexler); "Hasta Jesús Tuvo un Mal Día" – Rafa Arcaute, Renee Barri, Catriel Guerreiro, Ulises Guerriero, Martin Kierszenbaum, John Ryan, Gordon Matthew Thomas Sumner, Vicente Jimenez "Vibarco" & Federico Vindver, songwriters (Ca7riel & Paco Amoroso & Sting); "La Perla" – Noah Goldstein, David Rodríguez, Rosalía Vila Tobella, Ryan Tedder & Dylan Wiggins, songwriters (Rosalía, Yahritza Y Su Esencia); "Niño" – Santiago Alvarado, Mario del Transito Cocomarola, Camilo Joaquín Villarruel, Gregorio Armando Reinaldo Nelli & Santiago Ruiz, songwriters (Milo J)
Best Reggae Album: Too Too Bad – Buju Banton; Exile – Chronixx; Brightside – Ziggy Marley; The Art of Acceptance – Protoje; Supernova – Runkus; Lottery – Shaggy
Best Global Music Performance: "Varuvaaiy" – Devan Ekambaram featuring Susha; "Una Flor En Cada Estrella" – KerreKe, Mireya, Alex E. Chávez; "Bando [Orchestral]" – Angélique Kidjo featuring Pharrell Williams & Quavo; "Porcelana" – Rosalía featuring Dougie F; "Dai Dai" – Shakira & Burna Boy	Best Global Music Album: Equilibrium – Anitta; Oriadé – Davido; Hope – Angelique Kidjo; Starrgirl – Ayra Starr; Love Is a Kingdom – Tems
Best African Music Performance: "Gratitude" – Asake; "Aye Kan (Are You Coming Back)" – Angelique Kidjo feauring Ayra Starr; "No Tradition, No Africa" – King Ayisoba; "Big Daddy" – Tems; "Jogoodo" – Asake & Wizkid	Best New Age, Ambient or Chant Album: Night Music – Vicente Avella; Balance – Paul Avgerinos; Liminal – Brian Eno & Beatie Wolfe; Unspoken Psalms – Chris Redding; Tantrika – White Sun

=== Children's, Comedy, Audio Book Narration & Storytelling, Visual Media & Music Video/Film ===
Children's, Comedy, Audio Book Narration & Storytelling, Visual Media & Music Video/Film Field
Best Children's Album: All in Good Time – Snookuk; Hasta La Vista... Baby – Lucky Diaz and the Family Jam Band; Little Birdie's Big Symphony – Scott and Mark Hoying; Magnificent – Lachi; Starchild Vol. 1 – Divinity Roxx and Divi Roxx Kids	Best Comedy Album: Good Girl – Nikki Glaser; Joy in the Trenches – Trevor Noah; Legacy – Wanda Sykes; 100 Sound Effects – Fred Armisen; Take a Banana for the Ride – Jeff Ross; The Unstoppable – Dave Chappelle
Best Audio Book, Narration & Storytelling Recording: Future Boy – Michael J. Fox; The Look – Michelle Obama; The Man on the Run – Paul McCartney, Morgan Neville; Remix Meditation – Lil Jon; Star of the Show: My Life on Stage – Dolly Parton; Vagabond: A Memoir – Tim Curry	Best Compilation Soundtrack for Visual Media: The Devil Wears Prada 2 – Various artists; Stranger Things Season 5 – Various artists; Wicked: For Good – Various artists; The Wizard of Oz at Sphere – The Wizard of Oz at Sphere; Wuthering Heights – Charli XCX
Best Score Soundtrack Album for Visual Media: The Odyssey – Ludwig Göransson; One Battle After Another – Jonny Greenwood; Project Hail Mary – Daniel Pemberton; Star Wars: The Mandalorian and Grogu – Ludwig Göransson; Widow's Bay – David Fleming	Best Score Soundtrack for Video Games and Other Interactive Media: Avatar: Frontiers of Pandora – From the Ashes – John Paesano; 007: First Light – Joe Henson and Alexis Leon Smith; Ghost of Yōtei – Toma Otowa; Marvel’s Wolverine – David Fleming; Star Wars: Zero Company – Gordy Haab
Best Song Written for Visual Media: "House" (from Wuthering Heights); John Cale & Charlotte Aitchison, songwriters (Charli XCX featuring John Cale); "I Knew It, I Knew You" (from Toy Story 5); Jack Antonoff & Taylor Swift, songwriters (Taylor Swift); "Need Someone" (from The Pitt); Andrew Bird, songwriter (Andrew Bird and Gavin Brivik); "No Place Like Home" (from Wicked: For Good); Stephen Schwartz, songwriter (Cynthia Erivo); "Runway" (from The Devil Wears Prada 2); Henry Walter, Jaylah Hickmon, Dernst "D'Mile" Emile II, Stefani Germanotta, Jayda Love, Bruno Mars & Andrew Watt, songwriters (Lady Gaga and Doechii)
Best Music Video: "Lost Boys" – Phoebe Bridgers; Lance Oppenheim & Pablo Rochat, video directors; Pierre Moulène & Christian Vazquez, video producers; "Storm" – Gener8ion & Yung Lean; Romain Gavras, video director; Nicolas Galoux, Guillaume Le Gat & Maeva Tenneroni, video producers; "Hate That I Made You Love Me" – Ariana Grande; Christian Breslauer, video director; Mike Breslauer, Andrew Lerios & Luga Podesta, video producers; "Click Clack Symphony" – Raye featuring Hans Zimmer; Dave Meyers, video director; Maggie Curwin, video producer; "Berghain " – Rosalía, Björk and Yves Tumor; Nicolas Mendez, video director; Alba Barneda & Maria Rubio, video producers	Best Music Film: To Be Celestial vs. That's the Weight of the World – Earth, Wind & Fire; Ahmir "Questlove" Thompson, video director; Samantha Grogin, Ahmir "Questlove" Thompson, Arron Saxe, Dave Sirulnick & KB White, video producers; Hit Me Hard and Soft: The Tour Live – Billie Eilish; James Cameron & Billie Eilish, video directors; Michelle An, Maggie Baird, Steve Berman, John Brooks, Geoff Burdick, James Cameron, Paul Clarke, Chelsea Dodson, Billie Eilish, John Janick, Justin Lubliner, Jason Owen & Maria Wilhelm, video producers; Man on the Run – Paul McCartney; Morgan Neville, video director; Michele Anthony, David Blackman, Ben Chappell, Morgan Neville, Scott Rodger, Chloe Simmons & Meghan Walsh, video producers; EPiC: Elvis Presley in Concert – Elvis Presley; Baz Luhrmann, video director; Jeremy Castro, Matthew Gross, Baz Luhrmann, Colin Smeeton & Schuyler Weiss, video producers; Lilith Fair: Building a Mystery – The Untold Story – Various artists; Ally Pankiw, video director; Dan Levy & Christina Piovesan, video producers

=== Package, Notes & Historical ===
Package, Notes & Historical Field
Best Historical Album: The Bootleg Series Vol. 18: Through The Open Window, 1956-1963; Steve Berkowitz & Sean Wilentz, compilation producers; Steve Addabbo & Michael Piacentini, mastering engineers; Steve Addabbo & Michael Piacentini, restoration engineers (Bob Dylan); Classic V-Disc Big Band Jazz Sessions Limited Edition Box Set; Scott Wenzel, compilation producer; Shane Carroll & Nancy Conforti, mastering engineers (Various Artists); Clifton Chenier: King of Louisiana Blues & Zydeco; Adam Machado, compilation producer; Jessica Thompson, mastering engineer; Jessica Thompson, restoration engineer (Clifton Chenier); Ma Rainey: Mother Of The Blues, The Complete Paramount Recordings 1923-1928; Lars Edegran, compilation producer; Doug Benson, mastering engineer; Doug Benson, restoration engineer (Ma Rainey); Polish Radio Sessions 1970-1991; Adam Domagala, compilation producer; Jacek Gawlowski, mastering engineer; Jacek Gawlowski, restoration engineer (Tomasz Stańko)	Best Recording Package: Coloring Book; Alec Longstreth & Joe Spinelli, art directors (Weezer); Horizons/West; Jordan Butcher, art director (Thrice); If You Can Hold Your Breath; Farbod Kokabi, art director (Karate); Nothing’s About to Happen to Me; Mary Banas, Marc Burkhardt & Mitski Miyawaki, art directors (Mitski); Power to the People; Simon Hilton, Liz Hirsch & Sean Ono Lennon, art directors (John Lennon & Yoko Ono/Plastic Ono Band with Elephant’s Memory and Special Guests)
Best Album Cover: God Gotta Afro & Gold Hoops; Patso Dimitrov & Darin Gilliam, art directors (Rapsody); Sad and Beautiful World; Lauren N. Bailey, Trevor Hernandez & Elizabeth De La Piedra, art directors, art directors (Mavis Staples); This Mirror Weighs a Ton; Nick Steinhardt & Addie Wagenknecht, art directors (Interpol); West End Girl; Leith Clark & Nieves González, art directors (Lily Allen); What Happened to the Streets?; Tina Ibañez, art director (21 Savage)	Best Album Notes: Clifton Chenier: King of Louisiana Blues & Zydeco; Adam Machado, album notes writer (Clifton Chenier); Guglielmi: Amalia e Carlo (Live); Mitchell Hutchings, album notes writer (Florida Atlantic University Opera Theatre); Haydn: The Complete Decca Recordings; Dominic Fyfe, album notes writer (Antal Dorati); Mother of the Blues: The Complete Paramount Recordings, 1923-1928; David Sager, album notes writer (Ma Rainey); Pisces, Aquarius, Capricorn & Jones Ltd. (Super Deluxe Edition); Andrew Sandoval, album notes writer (The Monkees)

=== Production, Engineering, Composition & Arrangement ===
Production, Engineering, Composition & Arrangement Field
Producer of the Year, Classical: Blanton Alspaugh; 1. Akiho: Beneath Lighted Coffers (Andy Akiho, David Danzmayr & Oregon Symphony) (A); 2. Barber: Vanessa (Gianandrea Noseda, J'Nai Bridges, Nicole Heaston, Thomas Hampson, Susan Graham, Matthew Polenzani & National Symphony Orchestra) (A); 3. Mahler: Symphony No. 7 (Gianandrea Noseda & National Symphony Orchestra) (A); 4. Mazzoli: Breaking the Waves (Patrick Summers, Lauren Snouffer, Ryan McKinny & Houston Grand Opera) (A); 5. Orff: Carmina Burana (Jader Bignamini, Audivi, Detroit Opera Youth Chorus & Detroit Symphony Orchestra) (A); 6. Roots & Rivers (Joshua Habermann & Santa Fe Desert Chorale) (A); 7. Schubert: Lieder (Clara Osowski) (A); 8. Song Offerings - Choral Works by Christopher Tin (Christopher Tin, Joel Rinsema & Kantorei) (A); Silas Brown; 1. Hold These Truths (Lara Downes, 9 Horses & Invoke) (A); 2. Hourglass (Simone Dinnerstein & Baroklyn) (A); 3. Lamenting Earth (Nicholas Phan, Myra Huang & Jasper String Quartet) (A); 4. Last (Siwoo Kim & East Coast Chamber Orchestra) (A); 5. Puts: Emily - No Prisoner Be (Joyce DiDonato & Time for Three) (A); 6. Renewal - Music of Viet Cuong (David Alan Miller, Sandbox Percussion & Albany Symphony) (A); 7. Rise (Imani Winds) (A); 8. Dara Kirkland Snider: Forward Into Light (Andrew Cyr & Metropolis Ensemble) (A); Dmitriy Lipay; 1. Alma y Fuego (Gustavo Dudamel & Simón Bolívar Symphony Orchestra of Venezuela) (A); 2. The Art of Transcription (Alexander Lipay & Fanya Lin) (A); 3. Chen: Iris Dévoilée and L'Eloignement (Xian Zhang & Seattle Symphony) (A); 4. Cipullo: The Dialogue of Memories (Alastair Willis, Megan Marino, Dominic Armstrong, Daniel Belcher & Music of Remembrance) (A); 5. Pájaros Mágicos (Gustavo Dudamel & Los Angeles Philharmonic) (A); Elaine Martone; 1. Allison Loggins-Hull: The Cleveland Residency (Franz Welser-Möst & the Cleveland Orchestra) (A); 2. Black Being (Flutronix) (A); 3. Brouhaha - Shaped by Fire (Maiani Da Silva) (A); 4. Harlem Renaissance (John Morris Russell & Cincinnati Pops Orchestra) (A); 5. Mendelssohn: String Quartets Op. 12 & 13 (Verona Quartet) (A); 6. Patchwork (Allison Loggins-Hull) (A); 7. Soler! (Gerardo Teissonnière) (A); 8. Ustvolskaya: Symphony No. 5; Poulenc: La Voix Humaine (Franz Welser-Möst & the Cleveland Orchestra) (A); 9. Verdi: Requiem (Franz Welser-Möst, Lisa Wong, the Cleveland Orchestra & Chorus) (A); Dirk Sobotka; 1. Bruckner: Symphony No. 4 (Nathalie Stutzmann & Atlanta Symphony Orchestra) (A); 2. Dvořák: Symphony No. 9, From the New World; Simon: Four Black American Dances (Manfred Honeck & Pittsburgh Symphony Orchestra) (A); 3. Wagner: Der Ring Des Nibelungen (Fabio Luisi, Mark Delavan, Štefan Margita, Deniz Uzun, Laura Wilde, Jamez McCorkle, Hunter Enoch, Tamara Mumford & Dallas Symphony Orchestra) (A)	Best Immersive Audio Album: Captain Fantastic And The Brown Dirt Cowboy (50th Anniversary Edition); Greg Penny, immersive mix engineer; Greg Penny, immersive producer (Elton John); Ghost of Yōtei (Original Soundtrack); Eric Schilling, immersive mix engineer; Kellogg Boynton, Keith Leary, Peter Scaturro & Herbert Waltl, immersive producers (Toma Otowa); The Grotesque & The Sublime; Daniel Shores, immersive mix engineer; Daniel Shores, immersive mastering engineer (Iceland Symphony Orchestra); One Size Fits All; Karma Auger & Erich Gobel, immersive mix engineers; Joe Travers, immersive producer (Frank Zappa & The Mothers Of Invention); Petal; John Hanes, immersive mix engineer (Ariana Grande)
Best Instrumental Composition: "Epilogue"; JD Beck, Noé Degalle & Domi Louna, composers (Domi & JD Beck); "Found in a Frozen Fog"; Chris Eldridge, Brittany Haas, Paul Kowert, Noam Pikelny & Chris Thile, composers (Punch Brothers); "King of Coins "; ARKAI & Lindsey Stirling, composers (ARKAI & Lindsey Stirling); "Listen… (from Disclosure Day)"; John Williams, composer (John Williams); "Solace (Compassion)"; Kathryn Bostic, composer (Andreas Graf, London Symphony Orchestra & Ben Palmer)
Best Engineered Album, Classical: Akiho: Beneath Lighted Coffers & Concerto for Steel Pans & Orchestra"; Mark Donahue, engineer; Mark Donahue, mastering engineer (Andy Akiho, David Danzmayr & Oregon Symphony); Dvořák: Symphony No. 9, 'From the New World'; Simon: Four Black American Dances"; Mark Donahue, engineer; Mark Donahue, mastering engineer (Manfred Honeck & Pittsburgh Symphony Orchestra); Mahler: Symphony No. 2 'Resurrection'; Jon Johannsen, Jason O’Connell & Mark Willsher, engineers; Mark Willsher, mastering engineer (Esa-Pekka Salonen & San Francisco Symphony); Puts: Emily – No Prisoner Be; Silas Brown, engineer; Silas Brown, mastering engineer (Joyce DiDonato & Time For Three); Sarah Kirkland Snider: Forward Into Light; Silas Brown, Wellington Gordon, Charles Mueller, Doron Schachter, Ryan Streber & Mike Tierney, engineers; Silas Brown, mastering engineer (Andrew Cyr & Metropolis Ensemble); Ustvolskaya: Symphony No. 5; Poulenc: La Voix Humaine; Gintas Norvila, engineer; Jennifer Nulsen, mastering engineer (Franz Welser-Möst & the Cleveland Orchestra)	Best Engineered Album, Non-Classical: The Art of Loving; Julian Bunetta, Austin Christy, Dan Ewins, Jeff Gunnell, Charlie Holmes, Zach Nahome, John Ryan, Jan Trafas, Max Wolfgang & Matt Zara, engineers; Simon Francis, mastering engineer (Olivia Dean); Lux (Complete Works); Daniel Cayotte, Isaac Diskin, Tom Elmhirst, Nigel Godrich, Tristan Hoogland, Mike Larson, Manny Marroquin, Jake Miller, Joaquim Monte, Alberto Pérez, Billy Ray, David Rodríguez, Marta Salogni, Bergur Thorisson & Harry Wilson, engineers; Bob Jackson & Brian Lee, mastering engineers (Rosalía); Middle of Nowhere; Bryce Bordone, Serban Ghenea, Konrad Snyder & Mike Stankiewicz, engineers; Adam Grover, mastering engineer (Kacey Musgraves); Nine Inch Noize; Boys Noize, Jacob Moreno, Trent Reznor & Atticus Ross, engineers; Boys Noize, Jacob Moreno, Trent Reznor & Atticus Ross, mastering engineers (Nine Inch Nails & Boys Noize); The Thread; Joe Dougherty, Chris Greatti, Mitch McCarthy, Adam Schoeller & Willow Smith, engineers; Nathan Dantzler, mastering engineer (Willow)
Best Arrangement, Instrumental or A Cappella: "Blackbird"; Ben Bram & Blake Farfan, arrangers (New York Vocal Collective); "Olha Maria"; Ben Wendel, arranger (Ben Wendel); "Overjoyed (Live)"; Chick Corea, arranger (Chick Corea); "Radio Newsreel"; John Powell, arranger (John Powell); "Sir Duke"; Michael Mayo, arranger (Kings Return)	Best Arrangement, Instrumental and Vocals: "Click Clack Symphony"; Hendric Buenck, Russell Emanuel, Rachel Keen, Mike Sabath & Hans Zimmer, arrangers (Raye featuring Hans Zimmer); "The Governor's Waltz"; Phoebe Bridgers, Christian Lee Hutson, Rob Moose & Caroline Shaw, arrangers (Phoebe Bridgers); "Moon River"; Nan Schwartz, arranger (Studio Intensive Orchestra featuring Nnenna Freelon); "Send In the Clowns"; Darcy James Argue, arranger (Cécile McLorin Salvant, Metropole Orkest & Jules Buckley); "Shrink To Fantasy"; Chris Greatti, Zach Tenorio & Willow Smith, arrangers (Willow); "SMALL EYES"; JD BECK, Noé Degalle & DOMi LOUNA, arrangers (DOMi & JD BECK)

=== Classical ===
Classical Field
Best Orchestral Performance: "An American Dream?" — Barbara Hannigan; "Clyne: Color Field" — Marin Alsop; "Cuong: Orbital" — David Alan Miller; "John Williams and 'The President's Own,' Vol. 3" – John Williams; "Pájaros Mágicos" – Gustavo Dudamel	Best Opera Recording: Barber: Vanessa; Gianandrea Noseda, conductor; J’Nai Bridges, Susan Graham, Thomas Hampson, Nicole Heaston & Matthew Polenzani; Blanton Alspaugh, producer (National Symphony Orchestra; University of Maryland Concert Choir); Bates: The Amazing Adventures Of Kavalier & Clay; Yannick Nézet-Séguin, conductor; Patrick Carfizzi, Craig Colclough, Andrzej Filończyk, Miles Mykkanen, Edward Nelson, Sun-Ly Pierce & Lauren Snouffer; David Frost, producer (The Metropolitan Opera Orchestra; The Metropolitan Opera Chorus; Gene Scheer); Davis: The Central Park Five; Anthony Parnther, conductor; Lacey Jo Benter, Cedric Berry, Ashley Faatoalia, Orson Van Gay, Bernard Holcomb, William Powell, III & Justin Ryan; Greg Curtis, Anthony Davis & Anthony Parnther, producers (Long Beach Opera; Richard Wesley); Little: What Belongs To You; Alan Pierson, conductor; Karim Sulayman; Gavin Chuck, Andrew McKenna Lee & David T. Little, producers (Alarm Will Sound); Mazzoli: Breaking The Waves; Patrick Summers, conductor; Ryan McKinny & Lauren Snouffer; Blanton Alspaugh, producer (Houston Grand Opera Orchestra; Houston Grand Opera Chorus; Royce Vavrek)
Best Choral Performance: Hearne: Farming; Donald Nally, conductor (The Crossing); Here I Am; Eric Holtan, conductor (Susanna Phillips; True Concord Orchestra; True Concord Voices & Tucson Girls Chorus); Hopkins: My Fatherland; Gustavo Dudamel, conductor (Gregorio Nieto; Philharmonia Orchestra; The Bach Choir & Boy Choristers of Winchester Cathedral); Talbot: Piedra De Sol (Sunstone); Craig Hella Johnson, conductor (Conspirare); Yee: Trans Requiem; Melissa Attebury, conductor (Katherine Goforth, Breanna Sinclairé & Andrew Yee; Novus NY; Trinity Choir & Trinity Youth Chorus)	Best Chamber Music/Small Ensemble Performance: Bridgetower Project – Beethoven, Florence Price, Paquito D’Rivera Ilya Kaler & Rasa Vitauskaite, In Her Hands, Neave Trio; Kouyoumdjian: Paper Pianos – Alan Pierson & Alarm Will Sound; Puts: Emily – No Prisoner Be, Joyce DiDonato & Time For Three; Rhythm Nation – PUBLIQuartet
Best Classical Instrumental Solo: Akiho: Beneath Lighted Coffers & Concerto For Steel Pans & Orchestra – Andy Akiho; David Danzmayr, conductor (Oregon Symphony); Cuong: Re(new)al – Sandbox Percussion; David Alan Miller, conductor (Albany Symphony); Rubinstein: Piano Sonatas Nos. 3 & 4 (Han Chen); Stewart: 24 American Caprices Curtis Stewart; Thompson: Breathe/Burn: An Elegy; Yo-Yo Ma; Michael Stern, conductor (Kansas City Symphony)	Best Classical Solo Vocal Album: Lamenting Earth; Nicolas Phan (soloist); Myra Huang (pianist); Jasper String Quartet (artists); Legends: Rebellion; Laura Strickling (soloist); Joy Schreier (pianist); The Living Spiritual; Kenneth Overton (soloist); Elizabeth Hill (pianist); Over My Head; John Holiday (soloist); Kevin J. Miller (pianist); Solitude; Reginald Mobley (soloist); Brandon J. Acker & Douglas Balliett (artists)
Best Classical Compendium: Black Mozart; Jon Batiste; Jon Batiste, producer; My Brother’s Keeper; Steven Blier, Joshua Blue, Will Liverman, Joseph Parrish, AlanWilliams, Chaz’men Williams-Ali & Jorell Williams; Justin Austin, Steven Blier & Jonathan Estabrooks, producers; Renewal – Music Of Viet Cuong; Sandbox Percussion; David Alan Miller, conductor; Jonathan Allen, Silas Brown, Victor Caccese, Viet Cuong, Ian Rosenbaum & Terry Sweeney, producers; Rise; Imani Winds; Silas Brown, Mark Dover & Doron Schachter, producers; 25×25; Sō Percussion; Eric Cha-Beach, Matt Poirier, Josh Quillen, AdamSliwinski & Jason Treuting, producers	Best Contemporary Classical Composition: Bates: The Amazing Adventures of Kavalier & Clay; Mason Bates, composer (Yannick Nézet-Séguin, Lauren Snouffer, Andrzej Filonczyk, Craig Colclough, Miles Mykkanen, Patrick Carfizzi, Edward Nelson, Sun-Ly Pierce & The Metropolitan Opera); Davis: The Central Park Five; Anthony Davis, composer (Anthony Parnther, Lacey Jo Benter, Bernard Holcomb, Orson Van Gay, Ashley Faatoalia, Cedric Berry, William Powell, III & Justin Ryan); Dennehy: Violin Concerto; Donnacha Dennehy, composer (Stephen Waarts, Ryan McAdams & National Symphony Orchestra Ireland); Snider: Forward Into Light; Sarah Kirkland Snider, composer (Andrew Cyr & Metropolis Ensemble); Stewart, C.: 24 American Caprices; Curtis Stewart, composer (Curtis Stewart)

== Multiple nominations ==
The following received multiple nominations:

11 nominations

- Raye

9 nominations

- Rosalía

7 nominations

- Ella Langley
- Miranda Lambert
- Olivia Rodrigo
- Phoebe Bridgers

6 nominations

- Bruno Mars
- Leon Thomas
- Olivia Dean

5 nominations

- Silas Brown
- D'Mile
- Serban Ghenea
- Noah Goldstein
- Kehlani
- Randy Merrill
- Tom Norris
- Mike Sabath
- Jill Scott
- Taylor Swift
- Don Toliver
- Jesse Welles
- Lainey Wilson

4 nominations

- Angine de Poitrine
- Jon Batiste
- Cardi B
- Brandi Carlile
- Doechii
- Geese
- Ariana Grande
- Madonna
- Jake Miller
- PJ Morton
- Kacey Musgraves
- Zach Nahome
- Dan Nigro
- David Rodríguez
- Cécile McLorin Salvant
- Slayyyter
- Tame Impala
- Joybeth Taylor
- Tems
- Dylan Wiggins
