= List of Grammy Award categories =

The Grammy Awards are awarded in a series of categories, each of which isolates a specific contribution to the recording industry. The standard awards list nominees in each category, from which a winner is selected. In 1959, in the first award ceremony, 28 Grammys were awarded. The number of awards has grown over time as new categories are added; at one time, over 100 awards were given. The number has also fluctuated as some older ones were removed. From the 2026 ceremony, there are 96 categories, an increase of two from the previous year.

Some special awards are awarded without nomination in eight categories ranging from "Lifetime Achievement" to "Technical."

== General Field ==
The General Field (originally known as the "Big Four") contains six standard awards for musical works which do not restrict nominees by genre or other criteria; these awards are voted on by all members of the Academy.

- Record of the Year is awarded to the performer and the production team of a single song.
- Album of the Year is awarded to the performer, songwriter(s), and the production team of a full album.
- Song of the Year is awarded to the songwriter(s) of a single song.
- Best New Artist is awarded to an artist without reference to a song or album.
- Producer of the Year, Non-Classical, is awarded to a producer for a body of work.
- Songwriter of the Year, Non-Classical, is awarded to a songwriter for a body of work.

== Genre-specific fields ==
In the General Field, but not including special awards, there are 95 award categories; these were consolidated into 11 fields (down from 26).

Pop & Dance/Electronic

- Best Pop Solo Performance
- Best Pop Duo/Group Performance
- Best Asian Pop Music Performance
- Best Pop Vocal Album
- Best Dance/Electronic Recording
- Best Dance Pop Recording
- Best Dance/Electronic Album
- Best Remixed Recording, Non-Classical

Rock, Metal & Alternative

- Best Rock Performance
- Best Metal Performance
- Best Rock Song
- Best Rock Album
- Best Alternative Music Performance
- Best Alternative Music Album

R&B, Rap & Spoken Word Poetry

- Best R&B Solo Performance
- Best R&B Collaboration or Duo/Group Performance
- Best Traditional R&B Performance
- Best R&B Song
- Best Progressive R&B Album
- Best R&B Album
- Best Rap Performance
- Best Melodic Rap Performance
- Best Rap Song
- Best Rap Album
- Best Spoken Word Poetry Album

Jazz, Traditional Pop, Contemporary Instrumental & Musical Theater

- Best Jazz Performance
- Best Jazz Vocal Album
- Best Jazz Instrumental Album
- Best Large Jazz Ensemble Album
- Best Latin Jazz Album
- Best Alternative Jazz Album
- Best Traditional Pop Vocal Album
- Best Traditional Pop Vocal Performance
- Best Contemporary Instrumental Album
- Best Musical Theater Album

Country & American Roots

- Best Country Solo Performance
- Best Country Duo/Group Performance
- Best Country Song
- Best Contemporary Country Album
- Best Traditional Country Album
- Best American Roots Performance
- Best Americana Performance
- Best American Roots Song
- Best Americana Album
- Best Bluegrass Album
- Best Traditional Blues Album
- Best Contemporary Blues Album
- Best Contemporary Folk Album
- Best Traditional Folk Album
- Best Regional Roots Music Album

Gospel & Contemporary Christian

- Best Gospel Performance/Song
- Best Contemporary Christian Music Performance/Song
- Best Gospel Album
- Best Contemporary Christian Music Album
- Best Roots Gospel Album

Latin, Global, Reggae & New Age, Ambient or Chant

- Best Latin Song
- Best Latin Pop Album
- Best Música Urbana Album
- Best Latin Rock or Alternative Album
- Best Música Mexicana Album (including Tejano)
- Best Tropical Latin Album
- Best Global Music Performance
- Best African Music Performance
- Best Global Music Album
- Best Reggae Album
- Best New Age, Ambient Or Chant Album

Children's, Comedy, Audio Books, Visual Media & Music Video/Film

- Best Children's Music Album
- Best Comedy Album
- Best Audio Book, Narration & Storytelling Recording
- Best Compilation Soundtrack for Visual Media
- Best Score Soundtrack Album for Visual Media
- Best Score Soundtrack for Video Games and Other Interactive Media
- Best Song Written for Visual Media
- Best Music Video
- Best Music Film

Package, Notes & Historical

- Best Album Cover
- Best Recording Package
- Best Album Notes
- Best Historical Album

Production, Engineering, Composition & Arrangement

- Best Engineered Album, Non-Classical
- Best Engineered Album, Classical
- Producer of the Year, Classical
- Best Immersive Audio Album
- Best Instrumental Composition
- Best Arrangement, Instrumental or A Cappella
- Best Arrangement, Instruments and Vocals

Classical

- Best Orchestral Performance
- Best Opera Recording
- Best Choral Performance
- Best Chamber Music/Small Ensemble Performance
- Best Classical Instrumental Solo
- Best Classical Solo Vocal Album
- Best Classical Compendium
- Best Contemporary Classical Composition

== Special merit awards ==
There are special awards that are awarded without nominations, typically covering a period of time longer than the past year, which the standard awards apply to.

- Dr. Dre Global Impact Award (formerly the Global Impact Award) is a CEO Merit Award for artists whose dedication to the art form has greatly influenced the industry. The award is reserved only for Black individuals or groups.
- Lifetime Achievement Award is a Special Merit Award presented to performers (and some non-performers through 1972) who, during their lifetimes, have made creative contributions of outstanding artistic significance to the field of recording.
- Trustees Award is a Special Merit Award presented to individuals who, during their careers in music, have made significant contributions, other than performance (and some performers through 1983), to the field of recording.
- Technical Grammy Award is a Special Merit Award presented to individuals and/or companies who have made contributions of outstanding technical significance to the recording field.
- Legend Award is a Special Merit Award presented to individuals or groups for ongoing contributions and influence in the recording field; it was inaugurated in 1990.
- Hall of Fame Award was established in 1973 to honor recordings of lasting qualitative or historical significance that are at least 25 years old. Winners are selected annually by a special member committee of eminent and knowledgeable professionals from all branches of the recording arts.
- The MusiCares Person of the Year Award was established in 1991 to recognize a musician who has made an outstanding contribution to music and in addition has been active in works of philanthropy. This award is presented by the MusiCares foundation annually.
- Best Song for Social Change is a Special Merit Award determined by a blue ribbon committee and ratified by the Recording Academy Board of Trustees. Submissions must contain lyrical content that addresses a timely social issue and promotes understanding, peacebuilding and empathy.

== No longer awarded ==
Pop

- Best Female Pop Vocal Performance (1959–2011)
- Best Male Pop Vocal Performance (1959–2011)
- Best Pop Performance by a Duo or Group with Vocals (1966–2011)
- Best Pop Collaboration with Vocals (1995–2011)
- Best Pop Instrumental Performance (1969–2011)
- Best Pop Instrumental Performance by an Arranger, Composer, Orchestra and/or Choral Leader (awarded only in 1973)
- Best Performance by a Vocal Group (1961–1968)
- Best Performance by a Chorus (1961–1968)
- Best Instrumental Performance (1964–1967)
- Best Performance by an Orchestra – for Dancing (1960–1964)
- Best Performance by an Orchestra or Instrumentalist with Orchestra (1960–1964)
- Best Contemporary (R&R) Performance (1966–1968)
- Best Contemporary Performance by a Chorus (1969–1970)
- Best Contemporary Song (1960–1968, 1970–1971)

Rock

- Best Female Rock Vocal Performance (1980–1987, 1989–1991, 1993, 1995–2004)
- Best Male Rock Vocal Performance (1980–1987, 1989–1991, 1993, 1995–2004)
- Best Rock Solo Vocal Performance (1988, 1992, 1994, 2005–2011)
- Best Rock Performance by a Duo or Group with Vocal (1980–2011)
- Best Rock Instrumental Performance (1980–2011)
- Best Hard Rock/Metal Performance, Vocal or Instrumental (awarded only in 1989)
- Best Hard Rock Performance (1990–2011)
- Best Hard Rock/Metal Performance (2012–2013)

R&B

- Best Urban/Alternative Performance (2003–2011)
- Best Female R&B Vocal Performance (1968–2011)
- Best Male R&B Vocal Performance (1968–2011)
- Best R&B Performance by a Duo or Group with Vocals (1967–2011)
- Best Contemporary R&B Album (2003–2011)
- Best R&B Solo Vocal Performance, Male or Female (awarded only in 1967)
- Best R&B Instrumental Performance (1970, 1973–1990, 1993)

Rap

- Best Rap Solo Performance (1991–2002, 2005–2011)
- Best Rap Performance by a Duo or Group (1991–2011)
- Best Female Rap Solo Performance (2003–2004)
- Best Male Rap Solo Performance (2003–2004)

Country

- Best Female Country Vocal Performance (1965–2011)
- Best Male Country Vocal Performance (1965–2011)
- Best Country Performance by a Duo or Group with Vocals (1970–2011)
- Best Country Collaboration with Vocals (1988–2011)
- Best Country Instrumental Performance (1970–2011)
- Best Country & Western Recording (1959–1968)
- Best New Country & Western Artist (1965–1966)

Jazz

- Best Jazz Fusion Performance (1980–1991)
- Best Jazz Vocal Performance, Female (1981–1984, 1986–1991)
- Best Jazz Vocal Performance, Male (1981–1984, 1986–1991)
- Best Jazz Vocal Performance, Duo or Group (1982–1990)
- Best Original Jazz Composition (1961–1967)
- Best Contemporary Jazz Album (1992–2011)

Gospel/Contemporary Christian Music

- Best Pop/Contemporary Gospel Album (1991–2011)
- Best Rock Gospel Album (1991–2011)
- Best Traditional Gospel Album (1991–2011)
- Best Contemporary R&B Gospel Album (1991–2011)
- Best Contemporary Christian Music Song (2012–2014)
- Best Gospel/Contemporary Christian Music Performance (1968–1974, 1976–1977, 2005–2014)
- Best Gospel Choir or Chorus Album (1991–2006)
- Best Gospel Performance, Traditional (1978–1983)
- Best Gospel Performance, Contemporary (1978–1983)
- Best Gospel Song (2006–2014)
- Best Gospel Vocal Performance, Female (1984–1990)
- Best Gospel Vocal Performance, Male (1984–1990)
- Best Gospel Vocal Performance by a Duo or Group, Choir or Chorus (1984–1990)
- Best Soul Gospel Performance (1969–1977)
- Best Soul Gospel Performance, Traditional (1978–1983)
- Best Soul Gospel Performance, Contemporary (1978–1983)
- Best Soul Gospel Performance, Female (1984–1989)
- Best Soul Gospel Performance, Male (1984–1989)
- Best Soul Gospel Performance, Male or Female (awarded only in 1990)
- Best Soul Gospel Performance by a Duo or Group, Choir or Chorus (1984–1990)
- Best Southern, Country or Bluegrass Gospel Album (1991–2011)
- Best Inspirational Performance (1962–1986)

Latin

- Best Latin Recording (1976–1983)
- Best Latin Pop, Rock or Urban Album (awarded only in 2012)
- Best Banda or Norteño Album (awarded only in 2012)
- Best Regional Mexican Album (2009–2011)
- Best Mexican/Mexican-American Album (1984–2008)
- Best Banda Album (2007–2011)
- Best Norteño Album (2009–2011)
- Best Tejano Album (1999–2011)
- Best Latin Urban Album (2008–2010)
- Best Merengue Album (2000–2003)
- Best Salsa Album (2000–2003)
- Best Salsa/Merengue Album (2004–2006)

American Roots

- Best Ethnic or Traditional Folk Recording (1960–1986)
- Best Polka Album (1986–2009)
- Best Blues Album (2012–2016)
- Best Traditional Folk Album (1987–2011)
- Best Contemporary Folk Album (1987–2011)
- Best Hawaiian Music Album (2005–2011)
- Best Native American Music Album (2001–2011)
- Best Zydeco or Cajun Music Album (2008–2011)

Global Music

- Best Traditional World Music Album (2004–2011)
- Best Contemporary World Music Album (2004–2011)

Children's

- Best Musical Album for Children (1994–2011)
- Best Spoken Word Album for Children (1994–2011)
- Best Album for Children (1959–1968, 1970–1993, 2012–2015)

Musical Theater

- Best Sound Track Album or Recording of Original Cast From a Motion Picture or Television (1960–1962)

Composing/Arranging

- Best Arrangement (1960–1962)
- Best Vocal Arrangement for Two or More Voices (1977–1986)

Production/Engineering

- Best Engineered Recording – Special or Novel Effects (1960–1965)

Classical

- Best Instrumental Soloist(s) Performance (with orchestra) (1959–1966, 1972–1986, 1988–2011)
- Best Instrumental Soloist Performance (without orchestra) (1959–1966, 1972–1986, 1988–2011)
- Best Classical Performance, Operatic or Choral (1959–1960)
- Best Classical Performance – Instrumental Soloist or Soloists (with or without orchestra) (1967–1971, 1987)
- Best New Classical Artist (1964–1966, 1986)
- Best Chamber Music Performance (1959–2011)
- Best Classical Album (1962–2011)
- Best Classical Crossover Album (1999–2011)

Music Video/Film

- Best Concept Music Video (1988–1989)
- Best Performance Music Video (1988–1989)
- Video of the Year (1982–1983)

Disco

- Best Disco Recording (awarded only in 1980)

Packaging

- Best Boxed or Special Limited Edition Package (1995-2025)

== Changes in the 2010s ==
2012

On April 6, 2011 the Recording Academy announced a major overhaul of many Grammy Award categories. In 2012, the number of categories fell from 109 to 78. Some categories were discontinued, others were merged or renamed; notably merging gender specific categories.

2013

On June 8, 2012, the Academy announced a few changes as of 2013, including the addition of three new categories: Best Classical Compendium, Best Latin Jazz Album and Best Urban Contemporary Album. This meant the number of categories in 2013 rose to 81.

According to the Academy, the Best Classical Compendium is "for an album collection containing (...) newly recorded material of performances (vocal or instrumental) by various soloist(s) and/or ensemble(s) involving a mixture of classical subgenres." Albums entered in this category cannot be entered in other classical album categories, but individual tracks can.

The intent for the newly formed Best Latin Jazz Album is "to recognize recordings that represent the blending of jazz with Latin, Iberian-American, Brazilian, and Argentinean tango music."

The new Best Urban Contemporary Album category is for albums with contemporary songs derivative of R&B. It is for artists who blend contemporary styles with R&B music, such as urban (euro)pop, urban rock and/or urban alternative.

Other changes for the 2013 Grammy Award season were:

- Best Small Ensemble Performance category (in the classical field) has been renamed Best Chamber Music/Small Ensemble Performance.
- Best Latin Pop, Rock or Urban Album has been split into two categories: Best Latin Pop Album and Best Latin Rock, Alternative or Urban Album, thereby returning to the situation prior to 2012.
- The Best Banda or Norteño Album and Best Regional Mexican or Tejano Album categories have been merged into one category: Best Regional Mexican Music Album (including Tejano).
- Mastering engineers will now be considered nominees and award winners in the Record of the Year category.

2014

Changes were made in 2014. One was the introduction of a new category, Best American Roots Song, which encompasses all subgenres in the American roots music field such as Americana, bluegrass, blues, folk and regional roots music. The award will be presented to the songwriter(s). The Best Hard Rock/Metal Performance category, introduced in 2012, was split and recognises metal performances only. It was renamed Best Metal Performance (returning to the situation prior to 2012). Hard rock performances are screened in the Best Rock Performance category, thus losing its own genre award. The two Music Video categories were renamed. The Best Short Form Music Video became the Best Music Video category, while Best Long Form Music Video is now Best Music Film. The rules and description of these two categories did not change. Also new for 2014 was the Music Educator Award. It recognizes "current educators (kindergarten through college, public and private schools) who have made a significant and lasting contribution to the field of music education and who demonstrate a commitment to the broader cause of maintaining music education in the schools."

2015

The Recording Academy introduced further changes beginning on the 2015 ceremony: particularly allowing samples or interpolations of previously written songs in all songwriting categories, most notably the Song of the Year category. Additional changes include:

- the introduction of Best American Roots Performance in the American Roots Music Field
- Dance/Electronica Field to Dance/Electronic Music Field
  - renaming Best Dance/Electronica Album to Best Dance/Electronic Album
- introduction of Contemporary Instrumental Music Field
  - renaming of Best Pop Instrumental Album to Best Contemporary Instrumental Album
- restructuring the categories of the Gospel/Contemporary Christian Music Field
  - creation of Best Gospel Performance/Song, with both the artist(s) and songwriter(s) as recipient(s)
  - creation of Best Contemporary Christian Music Performance/Song, with both the artist(s) and songwriter(s) as recipient(s)
  - introduction of Best Roots Gospel Album
- moving Best Traditional Pop Vocal Album to the Pop Field
- changing Best Classical Vocal Solo (albums and tracks) to Best Classical Solo Vocal Album (limited to albums only)
- renaming Best Instrumental Arrangement to Best Arrangement, Instruments And Vocals
- renaming Best Instrumental Arrangement Accompanying Vocalist(s) to Best Arrangement, Instrumental Or A Cappella

The introduction of the changed will push the total number of categories to 83.

2017

In June 2016, the Grammy organization announced changes to the voting and awarding process.

Recordings released solely through streaming services became eligible to enter the award process. These recordings must be available through streaming platforms. Applicable streaming services are paid subscription, full catalog, on-demand streaming/limited download platforms that have existed as such within the United States for at least one full year as of the submission deadline. All recordings entered must have an assigned International Standard Recording Code (ISRC).

Best New Artist rules were amended to remove the album barrier given trends in how new music and developing artists are released and promoted; many new artists first release singles, tracks, or EPs rather than full albums. To become eligible in the category of Best New Artist, the artist, duo, or group:

- Must have released a minimum of five singles/tracks or one album, but no more than 30 singles/tracks or three albums.
- May not have entered the category more than three times, including as a performing member of an established group.
- Must have achieved a breakthrough into the public consciousness and impacted the musical landscape during the eligibility period.

The Best Blues Album category was split back into two distinct categories, as they were prior to 2012:

- Best Traditional Blues Album (Blues recordings with traditional blues song and harmonic structures, including various subgenres such as Delta blues, Piedmont blues, jump/swing blues, Chicago blues, and classic/Southern soul).
- Best Contemporary Blues Album (Recordings which may employ non-traditional blues rhythms such as funk, hip-hop, reggae, and rock, or which feature contemporary techniques such as synthesizers or loops).

The Best Rap/Sung Collaboration category (in the Rap field) was renamed as Best Rap/Sung Performance to allow solo performances, a result of "the current state and future trajectory of rap by expanding the category beyond collaborations between rappers and vocalists to include recordings by a solo artist who blurs the lines between rapping and singing."

Additional amendments were made to the number and type of music creators recognized in the categories of Best Choral Performance and Best Jazz Vocal Album.
