= Lisa Knowles =

American musician

Lisa Knowles-Smith
- Also known as: Lisa Knowles-Smith
- Born: Alescia Nicole Knowles; September 29, 1983 (age 42); Memphis, Tennessee
- Genres: contemporary Christian music, urban contemporary gospel, gospel, Southern gospel, traditional black gospel
- Occupations: Singer, songwriter
- Instruments: Vocals, singer-songwriter, piano
- Years active: 1996–present
- Label: Independent
- Website: evolutionofquartet.com

Alescia Nicole Knowles-Smith (born September 29, 1983), who goes by the stage name Lisa Knowles-Smith, is an American gospel musician. She started her music career in 1996 with her family group, The Brown Singers. They returned with the release of Experience the Evolution, that was released independently and topped Billboard's Top Gospel Albums Chart. The second album, The Evolution Continues, released in 2014 by One Voice Media. This album would chart on two Billboard charts the Gospel Albums chart, and the Independent Albums chart.

== Early life ==
Lisa was born as Alescia Nicole Knowles on September 29, 1983, in Memphis, Tennessee, as Alescia Nicole Knowles.

== Music career ==
Knowles-Smith's music career got started in 1996, in a group with her mother, grandmother, and cousins. On December 12, 2008, she & the Brown Singers independently released Experience the Evolution: Live in Memphis. This album was the ticket to national success as it gained them critical acclaim. She released her second album, The Evolution Continues, on March 10, 2014, by One Voice Media. This was her breakthrough released on the Billboard charts, and it placed at No. 6 on the Gospel Albums chart along with at No. 40 on the Independent Albums chart. She is nominated at the 30th Stellar Awards in the following categories: Traditional Group/Duo of the Year, Traditional Female Vocalist of the Year, and Quartet of the Year. She wins Traditional Group/Duo of the Year, and Quartet of The Year.

== Personal life ==
Knowles-Smith has three children: N'dia Jones (born July 19, 2003), Kaiden Newberry (born March 25, 2010), and Marcus Smith Jr. (born August 16, 2016). She married her husband, Marcus Smith, on August 14, 2015.

Knowles-Smith graduated cum laude with a bachelor’s degree in psychology from Stillman College in May 2024, at the age of 40. She is a member of Alpha Kappa Alpha.

== Discography ==
List of studio albums, with selected chart positions
Title	Album details	Peak chart positions	
Title	Album details	US Gos	US Indie
Experience the Evolution: Live in Memphis	Released: December 12, 2008; Label: Independent; CD, digital download	–	–
The Evolution Continues	Released: March 10, 2014; Label: One Voice; CD, digital download	6	40
