= Cara Paige =

American singer-songwriter

- Born: Cara Paige Miller; Atlanta, Georgia
- Education: University of Georgia
- Occupations: Singer; musician; songwriter
- Years active: 2017–present
- Musical career
- Genres: Americana; roots; gospel; rock; pop
- Instruments: Vocals; guitar
- Website: carapaigemusic.com

Cara Paige is an American singer, songwriter, and musician. In 2026, her album Light. Hope. Faith. was nominated for a Grammy Award for Best Roots Gospel Album taking place at the 69th Annual Grammy Awards in 2027.

== Early life and education ==
Cara Paige Miller was born and raised in Atlanta, Georgia. She began singing at age eight and performed in school musicals in elementary and middle school. In high school, Paige taught herself to play guitar and began writing songs. She has cited Taylor Swift as a musical influencee. She graduated from North Springs High School and earned a bachelor's degree at the University of Georgia.

== Career ==
Paige wrote her first song, "Red Flags", while in high school and used GarageBand to produce an album that wasn't formally released. After graduating from college, she began working with Justine Blazer, who produced her debut album, 23. The single, "23" debuted at #13 on iTune's Pop chart.

In 2026, Paige released the album, Light. Hope. Fear. (also produced by Blazer) with singles from the album, "We All Bleed Crimson Red" charting at #1 on iTunes' Singer/Songwriter chart and "Ain't That What Love Does" winning a Josie Music Award. That same year, the album was nominated for a Grammy Award for Best Roots Gospel Album.

- Discography

- 2026 - Light. Hope. Faith.
- 2025 - "We All Bleed Crimson Red" (single)
- 2025 - "Here's to the Man in Red"
- 2024 - 23
- 2021 - "Toyota Tacoma"
- 2017 - "Red Flags" (single)

== Awards ==
Year	Nominated work	Category	Award	Result
2026	Light. Hope. Faith	Best Roots Gospel Album	Grammy Award	Nominated
2026	"Ain't That What Love Does"	Songwriter Achievement	Josie Music Award	Won
2026	"Here's to the Man in Red"	Best Christmas Pop Song (female)	Holiday Music & Film Award	Nominated
2026	"Rock This Holiday"	Album of the Year (holiday)	Josie Music Award	Nominated
2026	"We All Bleed Crimson Red"	Social Impact Song of the Year (folk/americana)	Josie Music Award	Nominated
2025		Musician of the Year	International Singer-Songwriters Association Award	Won
2025	"Here's to the Man in Red"	Songwriter Achievement	Josie Music Award	Won
2024	"Joy in the Season"	Best Holiday Pop Song	Holiday Music & Film Award	Won
