= Grammy Award for Best Traditional Folk Album =

Music award category

- Awarded for: quality traditional folk music albums
- Country: United States
- Presented by: National Academy of Recording Arts and Sciences
- First award: 1987
- Currently held by: Carolina Chocolate Drops – Genuine Negro Jig (2011)
- Website: grammy.com

The Grammy Award for Best Traditional Folk Album is an award presented by the Recording Academy to honor quality folk music albums in any given year. The award was originally presented from 1987 to 2011, before being merged with Best Contemporary Folk Album to form the Grammy Award for Best Folk Album. The category was revived in 2026 and was re-presented at the 69th Annual Grammy Awards in 2027, with the Academy stating that the award honors “excellence in albums of traditional folk recordings.” The category sits in the Country & American Roots field.

The inaugural recipient of the award was Doc Watson, who won for his album Riding the Midnight Train at the 29th Annual Grammy Awards. June Carter Cash was the first and, to date, only female solo artist to win the award, first winning at the 42nd Annual Grammy Awards in 2000 for her album Press On. Watson and The Chieftains are tied for the most wins, with three, while Cash and Pete Seeger are the only other artists to win more than once. Norman Blake has the record for most nominations, with seven, as well as the most nominations without a win. The most recent recipients of the award are the Carolina Chocolate Drops, who won at the 53rd Annual Grammy Awards in 2011 for Genuine Negro Jig.

== Background ==
Prior to 1987, folk music was honored in the Best Ethnic or Traditional Folk Recording category. From 1987 to 1993 the award was known as the Grammy Award for Best Traditional Folk Recording and was presented under its current name from 1994. The category and it's Best Contemporary Folk Album counterpart were discontinued after 53rd Annual Grammy Awards the in 2011 during a major overhaul of Grammy categories, with the Recording Academy citing "challenges in distinguishing between traditional and contemporary folk". From 2012 to 2025, all folk music was honored with the Best Folk Album category.

The revival of the Best Traditional Folk Album category was announced on June 16, 2026 alongside Best Asian Pop Music Performance, Best R&B Collaboration or Duo/Group Performance, Best Traditional Pop Vocal Performance, and Best Latin Song. Of the announcement, Recording Academy CEO Harvey Mason Jr. stated, "2027 is going to be an amazing year for the Grammy Awards, and one that reflects the extraordinary growth we're seeing across music. The changes advanced by our Recording Academy members speak to the breadth of today's music industry and the many genres, crafts and creators shaping it. We're excited to see these updates come to life in the year ahead as we celebrate the music people who are driving music forward". It was stated that the re-separation of the Best Folk Album category "provides more precise recognition across different forms of folk music and better reflects the breadth of that musical landscape". The Folk Alliance International, a non-profit organization centred around the folk genre, petitioned the Recording Academy for the return of the Traditional and Contemporary Folk Album categories, and celebrated the announcement, stating that it was something their membership had "long called for" and which "addresses a significant representation and credibility gap in the genre" and challenges a "long-held stereotype that folk music is exclusively Eurocentric", as well as their hope that this would allow for more culturally diverse folk and traditional music to be honored moving forwards.

== Eligibility ==
According to the Recording Academy's rulebook for the 2027 ceremony, eligible albums for this category include recordings "with folk song structures, harmonic structures, and rhythms" and traditional folk instrumentation such as piano, harmonica, strings, percussion, and woodwind from around the world. Song types including sea shanties, old-time music, a capella, work songs, ballads, and call and response songs are all considered eligible as long as they are sonically distinct from regional roots music recordings, which are honored in the Best Regional Roots Music Album category.

== Recipients ==
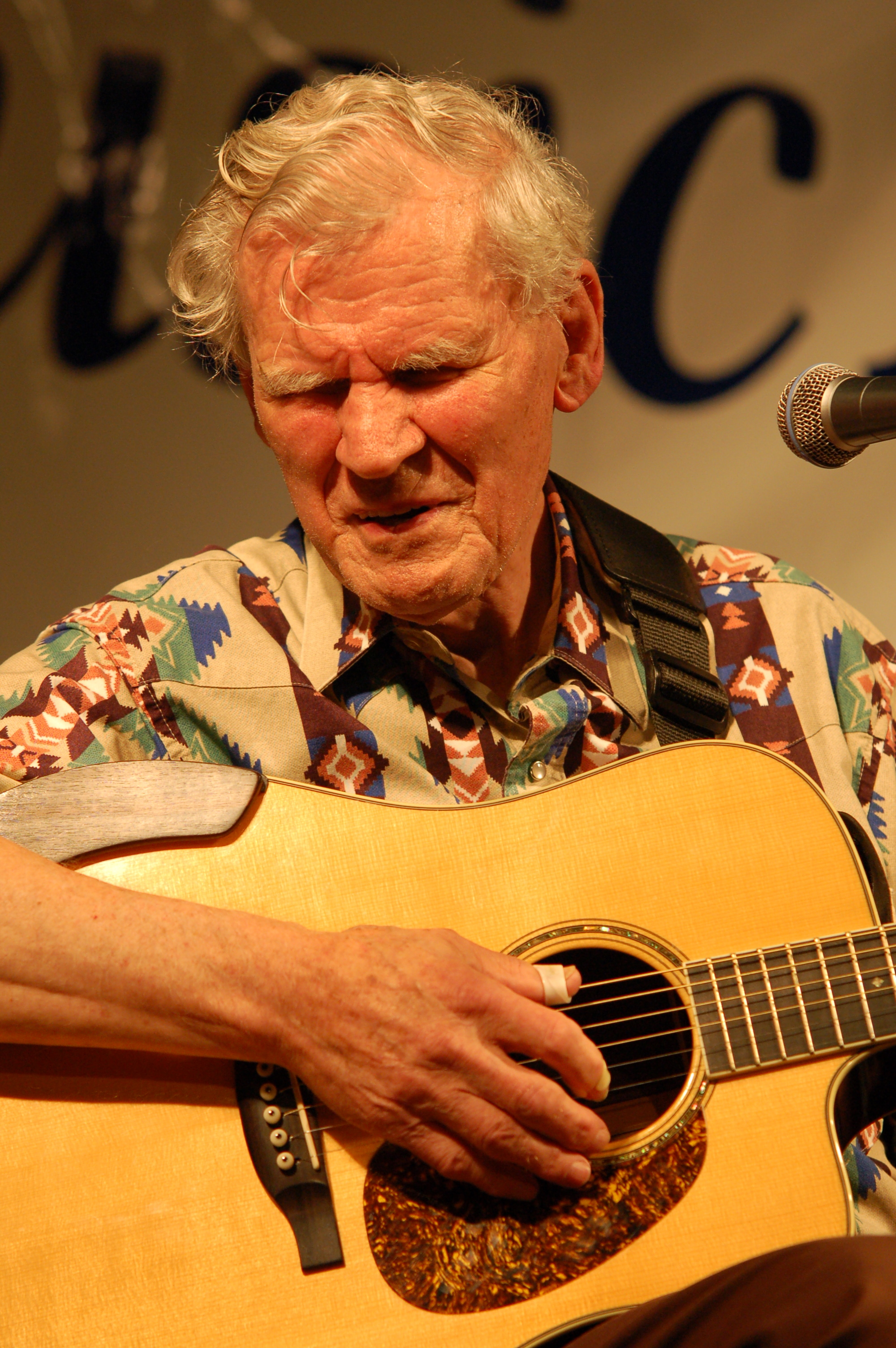
Inaugural recipient and three-time winner Doc Watson.

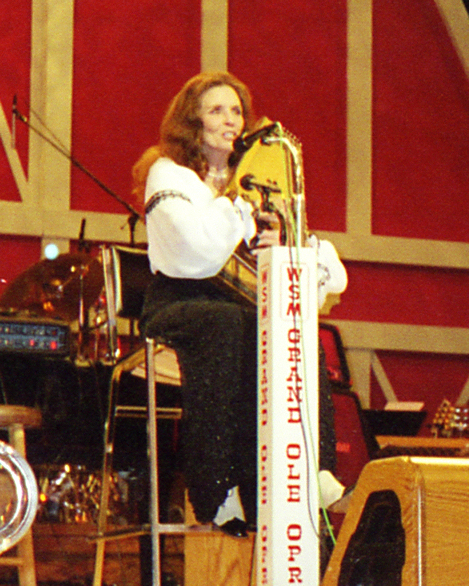
Three-time winner June Carter Cash.

=== 1987–2011 ===
Year	Winner(s)	Title	Nominees	Ref.
1987	Doc Watson	Riding the Midnight Train	Buckwheat Zydeco for Waitin' for My Ya Ya; New Lost City Ramblers with Elizabeth Cotten, Pete Seeger, Highwood String Band for 20th Anniversary Concert; Queen Ida for Caught in the Act; Rockin' Sidney for Hot Steppin' with Rockin' Sidney	
1988	Ladysmith Black Mambazo	Shaka Zulu	Veit Erlmann (compilation producer) for Mbube Roots, Zulu Choral Music from South Africa; The Chieftains for Celtic Wedding; Michael Doucet, BeauSoleil for Belizaire the Cajun; various artists for Zulu Men's Singing Competition	
1989	various artists	Folkways: A Vision Shared	Bob Dylan for "Pretty Boy Floyd"; Bulgarian State Television Female Vocal Choir for Le Mystère des Voix Bulgares; Ladysmith Black Mambazo for Journey of Dreams; Van Morrison, The Chieftains for Irish Heartbeat	
1990	Bulgarian State Television Female Vocal Choir	Le Mystère des Voix Bulgares, Volume II	The Cajun Tradition for Á la Vielle Façon; Various American Indian Tribes for American Indian Dance Theatre; Norman Blake, Nancy Blake for Blind Dog; Masters of Traditional Missouri Fiddling for Now That's a Good Tune	
1991	Doc Watson	On Praying Ground	Toinho de Alagoas, Duda da Passira, Jose Orlando, Heleno Dos Oito Baixos for Brazil Forro: Music for Maids and Taxi Drivers; Ladysmith Black Mambazo for Classic Tracks; Basin Brothers for Let's Get Cajun; The Whitstein Brothers for Old Time Duets; Various Artists for Partisans of Vilna: Songs of World War II Jewish Resistance	
1992	Various Artists	The Civil War	Doc Watson for My Dear Old Southern Home; Mike Seeger for Solo-Oldtime Country Music; Jimmy C. Newman for The Alligator Man; Various Artists for Le Mystère des Voix Bulgares Vol. 3	-
1993	The Chieftains	An Irish Evening	Norman and Nancy Blake for Just Gimme Somethin' I'm Used To; David Holt for Grandfather's Greatest Hits; Le Mystere des Voix Bulgares for A Cathedral Concert; D. L. Menard, Eddie LeJeune, Ken Smith for Le Trio Cadien	
1994	The Chieftains	The Celtic Harp	Le Mystere des Voix Bulgares for Melody, Rhythm & Harmony; Bill Morrissey, Greg Brown for Friend of Mine; R. Carlos Nakai, William Eaton, Black Lodge Singers for Ancestral Voices; Steve Riley and the Mamou Playboys for Trace of Time; Jody Stecher, Kate Brislin for Our Town	
1995	Bob Dylan	World Gone Wrong	BeauSoleil for L'Echo; Bulgarian State Television Female Vocal Choir for Ritual - Le Mystere des Voix Bulgares; Ladysmith Black Mambazo for Liph Iqiniso; John Renbourn, Robin Williamson for Wheel of Fortune; Mike Seeger for Third Annual Farewell Reunion	
1996	Ramblin' Jack Elliott	South Coast	Norman & Nancy Blake for While Passing Along This Way; Ali Akbar Khan for Then and Now; Laurie Lewis, Tom Rozum for The Oak and the Laurel; Dave van Ronk for From... Another Time & Place	
1997	Pete Seeger	Pete	Norman & Nancy Blake for The Hobo's Last Ride; John Hartford for Wild Hog in the Red Brush; Nusrat Fateh Ali Khan for Intoxicated Spirit; Ladysmith Black Mambazo for Thuthukani Ngoxolo - Let's Develop in Peace	
1998	BeauSoleil	L'Amour Ou La Folie	Hackberry Ramblers for Deep Water; New Lost City Ramblers for There Ain't No Way Out; Jo-El Sonnier for Cajun Pride; Jody Stecher, Kate Brislin for Heart Songs: The Old Time Country Songs of Utah Phillips	
1999	The Chieftains	Long Journey Home	Norman Blake for Chattanooga Sugar Babe; Greg Brown for Slant 6 Mind; Ramblin' Jack Elliott for Friends of Mine; Mike Seeger for Southern Banjo Sounds	
2000	June Carter Cash	Press On	Ramblin' Jack Elliott for The Long Ride; David Grisman, John Hartford, Mike Seeger for Retrograss; Bill Morrissey for Songs of Mississippi John Hurt; Doc & Richard Watson for Third Generation Blues	
2001	Dave Alvin	Public Domain	Norman Blake for Far Away, Down on a Georgia Farm; Ladysmith Black Mambazo for Live at the Royal Albert Hall; Natalie MacMaster for My Roots Are Showing; Jo-El Sonnier for Cajun Blood	
2002	Various Artists	Down from the Mountain	BeauSoleil for Looking Back Tomorrow: Beausoleil Live!; John Hartford for Hamilton Ironworks; Roger McGuinn, Various Artists for Treasures from the Folk Den; Various Artists for Avalon Blues - A Tribute to the Music of Mississippi John Hurt	
2003	Doc Watson	Legacy	Fiddlers 4 (Michael Doucet, Darol Anger, Bruce Molsky, and Rushad Eggleston) for Fiddlers 4; Cathy Fink, Marcy Marxer for Postcards; Jorma Kaukonen for Blue Country Heart; Peter Rowan, Don Edwards for High Lonesome Cowboy; Various Artists for Evangeline Made - A Tribute to Majun Music	
2004	June Carter Cash	Wildwood Flower	Steve Forbert for Any Old Time; Steve Riley and the Mamou Playboys for Bon Reve; Earl Scruggs, Doc Watson, Ricky Skaggs for The Three Pickers; Pete Seeger & Friends for Seeds: The Songs of Pete Seeger, Volume 3	
2005	Various Artists	Beautiful Dreamer	BeauSoleil for Gitane Cajun; Norman & Nancy Blake for The Morning Glory Ramblers; Rosalie Sorrels & Friends for My Last Go Round; Dave Van Ronk for ...And the Tin Pan Bended, and the Story Ended...	
2006	Tim O'Brien	Fiddler's Green	The Chieftains for Live from Dublin - A Tribute to Derek Bell; Jimmie Dale Gilmore for Come On Back; Tom Paxton for Live In the UK; Jo-El Sonnier for Cajun Mardi Gras!	
2007	Bruce Springsteen	We Shall Overcome: The Seeger Sessions	Ramblin' Jack Elliott for I Stand Alone; Odetta for Gotta Let It Shine; Linda Ronstadt, Ann Savoy for Adieu False Heart; Ralph Stanley for A Distant Land to Roam: Songs of the Carter Family	
2008	Levon Helm	Dirt Farmer	David Bromberg for Try Me One More Time; Peter Case for Let Us Now Praise Sleepy John; Cathy Fink for Banjo Talkin'; Charlie Louvin for Charlie Louvin	
2009	Pete Seeger	At 89	Kathy Mattea for Coal; Tom Paxton for Comedians & Angels; Peggy Seeger for Bring Me Home; Rosalie Sorrels for Strangers In Another Country	
2010	Loudon Wainwright III	High Wide & Handsome: The Charlie Poole Project	David Holt, Josh Goforth for Cutting Loose; Maura O'Connell for Naked With Friends; Jimmy Sturr and His Orchestra for Polka Cola: Music That Refreshes; Various Artists for Singing Through the Hard Times: A Tribute to Utah Phillips	
2011	Carolina Chocolate Drops	Genuine Negro Jig	Luther Dickinson & the Sons of Mudboy for Onward and Upward; The John Hartford Stringband for Memories of John; Maria Muldaur for Maria Muldaur & Her Garden of Joy; Ricky Skaggs for Ricky Skaggs Solo: Songs My Dad Loved	

=== 2027- ===
Year	Winner(s)	Title	Nominees	Ref.
2027	Winnar TBA on 7 February 2027		Renée Fleming & Béla Fleck - The Fiddle and the Drum; Natalie & Brittanny Haas - North Node; E.J. Ouellette - The Fiddle Funnel Sessions; Tom Paxton & John McCutcheon - Together Again; Jesse Welles - Under the Powerlines III (January 2025-June 2025)	

== Artists with multiple wins ==
3 wins

- Doc Watson
- The Chieftains

2 wins

- June Carter Cash
- Pete Seeger

== Artists with multiple nominations ==
7 nominations

- Norman Blake

6 nominations

- Ladysmith Black Mambazo
- The Chieftains

5 nominations

- BeauSoleil
- Doc Watson
- Nancy Blake

4 nominations

- Mike Seeger
- Pete Seeger
- Ramblin' Jack Elliott

3 nominations

- Bulgarian State Television Female Vocal Choir
- Jo-El Sonnier
- John Hartford

2 nominations

- Bill Morrissey
- Bob Dylan
- Cathy Fink
- Dave Van Ronk
- David Holt
- Greg Brown
- Jody Stecher
- Le Mystere des Voix Bulgares
- Michael Doucet
- New Lost City Ramblers
- Ricky Skaggs
- Rosalie Sorrels
- Steve Riley and the Mamou Playboys
- Tom Paxton
