= Kris Angelis =

American folk singer

- Angelis in 2026

Background information
- Genre: Folk
- Occupation: Singer
- Years active: 2009–present
- Label: Blue Élan Records

Kris Angelis is an American folk singer. She was nominated for a Grammy Award in the category Best Contemporary Folk Album for the album Le Sigh.
