= Grammy Award for Best Traditional Pop Vocal Performance =

Award presented by the Recording Academy

- Awarded for: Quality vocal traditional pop recordings
- Presented by: National Academy of Recording Arts and Sciences
- First award: 2027
- Currently held by: TBA
- Website: grammy.com

The Grammy Award for Best Traditional Pop Vocal Performance is an award presented by the Recording Academy to honor quality Traditional pop music performances in any given year. The award will be presented for the first time at the 69th Annual Grammy Awards in 2027, and sits in the Jazz, Traditional Pop, Contemporary Instrumental & Musical Theater field.

The Academy announced the new category in June 2026, stating that the award “recognizes excellence in singles and tracks that consist of a type and style of song and/or performance that cannot properly be intermingled with present forms of pop music.”

The award goes to the artist(s).

== Background ==
Best Traditional Pop Vocal Performance was announced on June 16, 2026 alongside Best Asian Pop Music Performance, Best R&B Collaboration or Duo/Group Performance, Best Traditional Folk Album, and Best Latin Song. Of the announcement, Recording Academy CEO Harvey Mason Jr. stated, "2027 is going to be an amazing year for the Grammy Awards, and one that reflects the extraordinary growth we're seeing across music. The changes advanced by our Recording Academy members speak to the breadth of today's music industry and the many genres, crafts and creators shaping it. We're excited to see these updates come to life in the year ahead as we celebrate the music people who are driving music forward".

== Eligibility ==
According to the Recording Academy's rulebook for the 2027 ceremony, this category includes new recordings from sources such as the Great American Songbook, and classic forms of music from any era in addition to original compositions. The term "traditional" references the style of the composition, instrumental arrangement, and vocal styling rather than the age of the material itself. Eligible recordings in the category also include performances of songs that are primarily defined by the qualities inherent in musical theater.

== Recipients ==
Year	Artist	Work
2027
2027	Olivia Dean	"A Couple Minutes"
2027	Cynthia Erivo and Ariana Grande	"For Good"
2027	Laufey	"Madwoman"
2027	Raye	"I Hate the Way I Look Today"
2027	Nicole Zuraitis featuring Gilad Hekselman	"All That's Left"

^{^[I]} Each year is linked to the article about the Grammy Awards held that year.
