= Jasper String Quartet =

Professional string quartet in Philadelphia, Pennsylvania, U.S.

The Jasper String Quartet is a professional string quartet based in Philadelphia, Pennsylvania. Currently the Ensemble in Residence at Temple University's Center for Gifted Young Musicians, the quartet was previously the Quartet in Residence at Oberlin Conservatory (from 2010–2012). Formed in 2004 while its members were in school at Oberlin Conservatory, the quartet completed string quartet master's programs at Rice University (2006–2008) and Yale University (2008–2010). The group's primary mentors are James Dunham, Norman Fischer and the Tokyo String Quartet. In 2010, they joined the roster of Astral Artists.

The Jasper String Quartet received Chamber Music America's prestigious Cleveland Quartet Award in 2012. In 2015, they commissioned and performed the premiere of Aaron Jay Kernis' 3rd String Quartet "River". The piece was commissioned for the quartet by a consortium of presenters including the Caramoor Center for Music and the Arts, Chamber Music Northwest, Chamber Music Monterey Bay, Carnegie Hall, Classic Chamber Concerts of Naples, FL and Wigmore Hall. Funding was also provided by the Chamber Music America Classical Commissioning Program, with generous funding provided by The Andrew W. Mellon Foundation, and the Chamber Music America Endowment Fund.

The Jasper String Quartet records for the Sono Luminus Label.

== Members ==
J Freivogel, violin

Karen Kim, violin

Andrew Gonzalez, viola

Rachel Henderson Freivogel, cello

== Awards and recognition ==
- 2017 – Record album "Unbound" named as one of the New York Times top 25 Classical Music Recordings of 2017
- 2014 – Chamber Music America's Classical Commissioning Grant Recipient
- 2012 – Cleveland Quartet Award
- 2012 – Chamber Music America's Residency Partnership Program Grant Recipient – in partnership with Astral Artists
- 2010–2012 – String Quartet in Residence at Oberlin Conservatory
- 2010 – Yale School of Music’s Horatio Parker Memorial Prize
- 2009–2011 – Caramoor Center's Ernst Stiefel String Quartet in Residence
- 2008 and 2009 – Silver Medal at the Fischoff Chamber Music Competition
- 2008 – Grand Prize and the Audience Prize in the Plowman Chamber Music Competition
- 2008 – Grand Prize at the Coleman Competition
- 2008 – First Prize at Chamber Music Yellow Springs

== Recordings ==
- The Kernis Project: Beethoven – Beethoven Op. 59 No. 3, Kernis Quartet No. 2 "musica instrumentalis" (2011)
- The Kernis Project: Schubert – Schubert D. 810 "Death and the Maiden", Kernis Quartet No. 1 "musica celestis" (2012)
- Beethoven Op. 131 (2014, digital only release)
- Unbound – "Valencia" by Caroline Shaw, "Death Valley Junction" by Missy Mazzoli, "The Blue Horse Walks on the Horizon" by Annie Gosfield, "Four on the Floor" by Judd Greenstein, "almost all the time" David Lang, "Pushpulling" by Donnacha Dennehy, "Excerpts from the middle of something" by Ted Hearne
