= Grammy Award for Best R&B Collaboration or Duo/Group Performance =

Award presented by the Recording Academy

- Awarded for: Artistic excellence in a duo, group, or collaborative vocal or instrumental R&B performance
- Presented by: National Academy of Recording Arts and Sciences
- First award: 2027
- Currently held by: TBA
- Website: grammy.com

The Grammy Award for Best R&B Collaboration or Duo/Group Performance is an award presented by the Recording Academy to honor quality R&B performances in any given year. The award was presented for the first time at the 69th Annual Grammy Awards in 2027, and sits in the R&B, Rap & Spoken Word Poetry field.

The Academy announced the new category in June 2026, stating that the award “recognizes excellence in contemporary R&B performances for works by established duos or groups, as well as collaborative works between solo artists, duos and groups.”

The award goes to the artist(s).

== Background ==
The category was established in response to calls from Recording Academy members for a dedicated category to recognise that collaboration is a "defining element of R&B".

Best R&B Collaboration or Duo/Group Performance was announced on June 16, 2026 alongside Best Asian Pop Music Performance, Best Traditional Pop Vocal Performance, Best Traditional Folk Album, and Best Latin Song. Of the announcement, Recording Academy CEO Harvey Mason Jr. stated, "2027 is going to be an amazing year for the Grammy Awards, and one that reflects the extraordinary growth we're seeing across music. The changes advanced by our Recording Academy members speak to the breadth of today's music industry and the many genres, crafts and creators shaping it. We're excited to see these updates come to life in the year ahead as we celebrate the music people who are driving music forward".

== Eligibility ==
According to the Recording Academy's rulebook for the 2027 ceremony, eligible recordings may incorporate elements of other genres, including hip-hop, pop, and electronic music, while clearly remaining rooted primarily in R&B. Only songs performed by an established duo or group, or a collaboration between solo artists or duo/groups are eligible, with solo artists now being honored in the newly renamed Best R&B Solo Performance category. To be eligible for Best R&B Collaboration or Duo/Group Performance, a recording must be considered a contemporary R&B performance, which is sonically distinct from more traditional-leaning styles associated with the genre. Those recordings are instead considered eligible for the Best Traditional R&B Performance category.

== Recipients ==
| Year | Artist | Work |
|---|---|---|
2027
| 2027 | Chris Brown featuring Leon Thomas | "Fallin'" |
| 2027 | Lalah Hathaway featuring J. Ivy | "47th Street" |
| 2027 | Kehlani featuring Leon Thomas | "Sweet Nuthins" |
| 2027 | PJ Morton featuring Keyon Harrold | "Mess" |
| 2027 | Jill Scott featuring JID | "To B Honest" |

^{^[I]} Each year is linked to the article about the Grammy Awards held that year.

== Artists with multiple nominations ==
====== 2 nominations ======
- Leon Thomas
