= Runkus =

Jamaican reggae musician

- Bennett in 2018

Background information
- Born: Romario Sebastian Anthony Bennett; Jamaica
- Genre: Reggae
- Occupation: Musician

Romario Sebastian Anthony Bennett is a Jamaican reggae musician. He was nominated for a Grammy Award in the category Best Reggae Album for the album Supernova.
