= Forward Into Light =

Orchestral work by Sarah Kirkland Snider

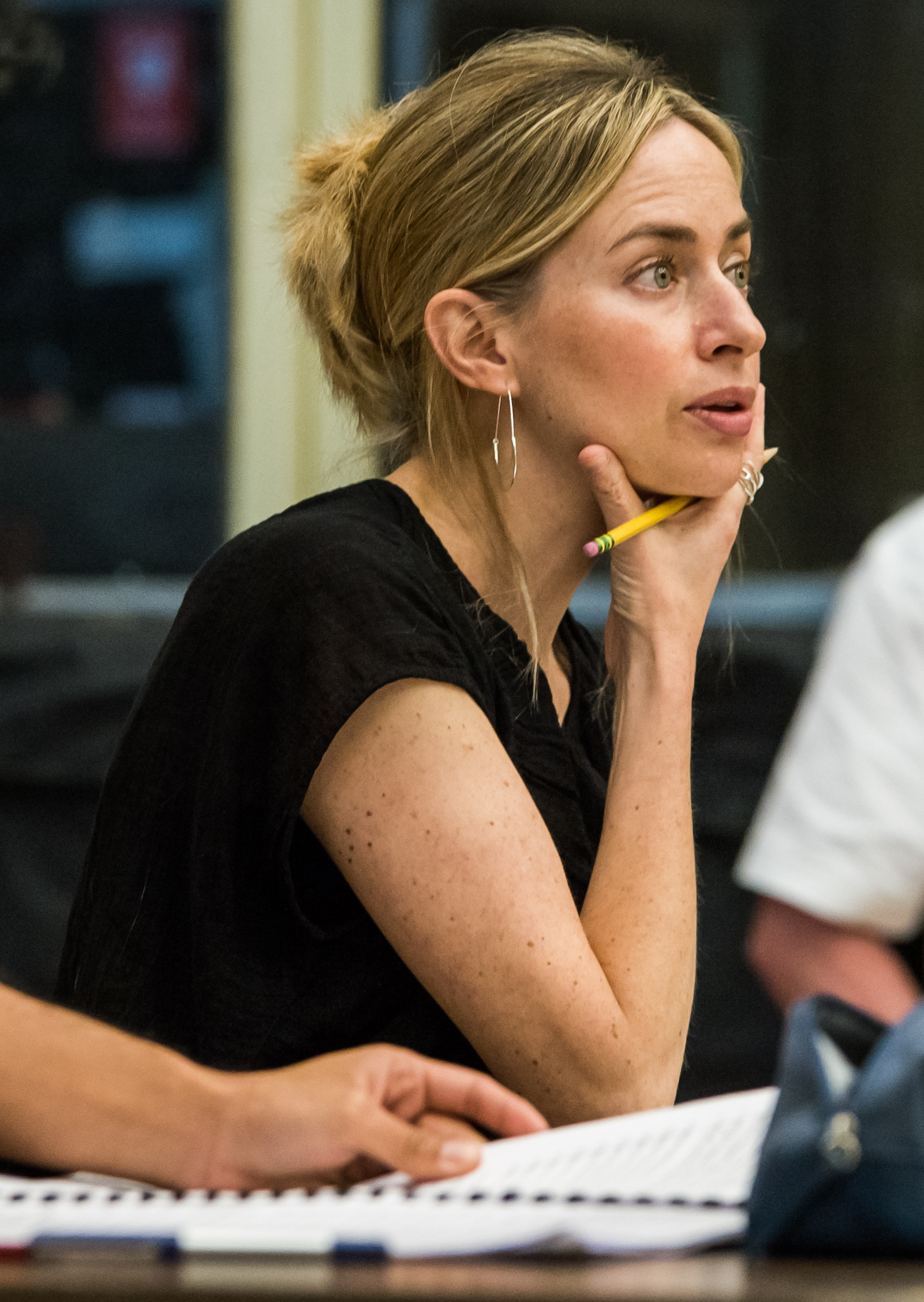
Sarah Kirkland Snider in 2018

Forward Into Light is an orchestral composition written in 2020 by the American composer Sarah Kirkland Snider. The work was commissioned by the New York Philharmonic as part of "Project 19," an initiative commissioning new works by 19 female composers in honor of the centennial of the ratification of the Nineteenth Amendment to the United States Constitution. Its world premiere, which was delayed by the COVID-19 pandemic, was performed by the New York Philharmonic under the direction of Jaap van Zweden at Carnegie Hall on June 10, 2022.

== Composition ==
=== Background ===
Forward Into Light lasts about 14 minutes and is cast in a single movement. Its composition was inspired by American women suffragists, about which Snider wrote in the score program note:

I wrote the music thinking about what it means to believe in something so deeply that one is willing to endure harassment, isolation, assault, incarceration, hunger, force-feedings, death threats, and life endangerment to fight for it. The music reflects what I imagine a suffragist’s internal psychological landscape might have resembled: a struggle along the emotional continuum between hope and doubt, inspiration and exhaustion, faithlessness and resilience.

The piece thus contains musical quotes from "The March of the Women"—a women's suffrage anthem composed in 1910 by the British composer and suffragette Ethel Smyth. The title of the work comes from a slogan written on a banner carried by the American suffragette Inez Milholland while riding a white horse during the Woman Suffrage Procession in Washington, D.C., on March 3, 1913, that read:

Forward, out of error
Leave behind the night
Forward through the darkness
Forward into light!

=== Instrument ===
The work is scored for a large orchestra comprising piccolo, two flutes, three oboes (3rd doubling cor anglais), three clarinets (1st doubling clarinet in A; 2nd doubling E♭ clarinet; 3rd doubling bass clarinet and clarinet in A), three bassoons (3rd doubling contrabassoon), four horns, three trumpets, three trombones, tuba, timpani, three percussionists, piano (doubling celesta), harp, and strings.

== Reception ==
Reviewing the world premiere, Seth Colter Walls of The New York Times described the music as "by turns fragile and ferocious" and "[boasting] touches of mordant wit." Despite criticizing the sampling of Smyth's "The March of Women" late in the piece, he nevertheless wrote that "even in the densest moments, you could discern Snider's feel for wry commentary. A few walloping brass passages seemed to offer knowing nods and the subtlest of eye-rolls — as though the characters who inspired this music were aware that the unshakable strengths of the suffrage movement could outlast early, noisy objections."
