= The Odyssey (soundtrack) =

The Odyssey (Original Motion Picture Soundtrack)

Film score by Ludwig Göransson
- Released: July 17, 2026
- Recorded: 2025
- Studios: Abbey Road (London); AK Records (Tirana); Conway (Hollywood); Elbo (Glendale); Kuzum Baba (Vlorë); Real World (Box)
- Genres: Orchestral; contemporary classical; film score
- Length: 118:15
- Label: Back Lot Music
- Producers: Ludwig Göransson; Serena Göransson

Ludwig Göransson chronology
| The Mandalorian and Grogu (2026) | The Odyssey (Original Motion Picture Soundtrack) (2026) |

The Odyssey (Original Motion Picture Soundtrack) is the film score composed by Ludwig Göransson to the 2026 epic fantasy action film The Odyssey written, directed and co-produced by Christopher Nolan which is an adaptation of Homer's ancient Greek epic poem the Odyssey and features an ensemble cast consisted of Matt Damon, Tom Holland, Anne Hathaway, Robert Pattinson, Lupita Nyong'o, Samantha Morton, Zendaya and Charlize Theron. The film marked Göransson's third collaboration with Nolan.

The film's soundtrack featured 22 tracks of Göransson's score along with an original song "When I'm Home" performed by English singer James Blake and American rapper Travis Scott, who also co-wrote it with Göransson and Nolan himself. The album was released through Back Lot Music, day-and-date with the film on July 17, 2026, to widespread critical acclaim.

== Development ==
By April 2025, Ludwig Göransson was composing the musical score for The Odyssey after previously working with Nolan on Tenet (2020) and Oppenheimer (2023). For the score, Nolan sought not to feature an orchestra, which is commonly associated with sword-and-sandal films. As such, Göransson experimented with 35 bronze gongs, each varying through shape and size, and recorded them with synthesizers. Nolan suggested using the sound of the lyre for when Odysseus plucks his bow, and was particularly interested in the aulos. Göransson used both of these, along with bronze instruments, due to the Bronze Age setting.

Musicians Callum Armstrong and Rosa Fragorapti worked on designing functional replicas for the aulos and lyre, and researched ancient source material and old urns, in part because the original reeds for the aulos no longer existed. Armstrong added that since the origins of the instruments dated from 6th to the 5th century B. C., the musician and Göransson had worked with archaeomusicologists and ethnomusciologists who had an idea of how these instruments could be used and played. Göransson further travelled to southern Albania to capture a traditional folk singing style called Albanian iso-polyphony, which he never heard in films. He further recorded flutes played by Albanian shepherds who played for thousands of years. Göransson added that the recording should be done by 6:00 p.m. as the shepherds had to wake up at 4:00 a.m. to tend to their sheep.

Vocals were also used in the score, as it would "add some of the more emotional pacing of the score". English electronic musician James Blake and American rapper Travis Scott contributed vocals to the score, with the two also collaborating with Göransson on an original song, "When I'm Home", which plays over the closing credits. Nolan is credited as a co-writer of the song.

Göransson added that much of the score started off with organic sounds from the film's environment that resembled the nature and perfectly encapsulates it. The score also uses a pulsating rhythm that progressively accelerates to heighten the tension of the Trojan War battle sequences. The effect was noted by actor Tom Holland, who plays Telemachus, after visiting the set. Director Christopher Nolan explained that the technique uses a Shepard tone, in which a rhythmic pattern appears to accelerate continuously, creating an escalating sense of anxiety and tension. Nolan said the technique was developed with Hans Zimmer during the production of Dunkirk, where it was used to create a similar sensation of relentless acceleration.

== Release ==
The soundtrack album was released digitally by Universal's Back Lot Music label on July 17, 2026, coinciding with the release date. Record manufacturer Mutant released a double album CD and a triple vinyl version.

== Reception ==
Like the film, the soundtrack and musical score were met with critical acclaim. Zanobard Reviews wrote "Ludwig Göransson's The Odyssey makes for a challenging listen at times, with dramatically distorted synth & harsh electronics hammering home the tension of Odysseus' journey. But in its bolder moments where melancholy lifts themes into rippling vocal hope – it's utterly spellbinding." Gregory Nussen of Deadline Hollywood wrote "Ludwig Göransson's beguiling score is perfectly used as propulsion rather than distraction, as can sometimes be the case with Nolan's reliance on sound design." Jeremy Konrad of Bleeding Cool called it an "electrifying score". Tim Grierson of Screen International wrote "Ludwig Goransson suppl[ies] a pounding score". Paul Bradshaw of NME called it a "visceral score".

David Rooney of The Hollywood Reporter wrote "Ludwig Göransson's shape-shifting score fuels a turbulent soundscape, notably in percussive passages when it builds into the pounding drums of warfare, a motif of contemporary life just as it was 30-plus centuries ago." Amy Nicholson of Los Angeles Times wrote "Composer Ludwig Göransson scores the breath-holding assault on Troy to drums that pound faster and faster on our nerves, as does our alarm that Odysseus' troops aren't the good guys. Occasionally, Göransson adds a lovely monotone layer of woodwinds or a keening chorus that sounds like the oldest song on Earth." Jake Kleinman of Polygon called it "a masterful score from Ludwig Göransson".

Nick Howells of The Standard claimed that Göransson "looks like a shoe-in for his fourth Oscar." Joe Schmidt of Collider wrote "Ludwig Göransson puts in another epic score that reaffirms his status as one of the greatest composers and music producers alive today. His motifs quickly become familiar and help guide the narrative, and moments of tension are brilliantly subdued and patient, swelling at the perfect moment. His progressions during the epic fight sequences add to the brutality of battle, swelling in moments of triumph or defeat, whether that be in the foggy woods of the Laestrygonians or under the cover of night in the Fall of Troy."

Tori Brazier of Metro wrote "The Odyssey's sound design and music – from returning Oscar-winning composer Ludwig Göransson – are interwoven and highly immersive. This is especially well done during Odysseus and his men's terrifying encounter with the Cyclops (Bill Irwin). It's a raw and less orchestral soundtrack than most films, which fits well with the age of oral storytelling – personified here by Travis Scott's Bard, who takes the film's opening lines."

In contrast, Filmtracks' Christian Clemmensen gave the score an overall negative review, dubbing it "an ineffective exercise in sound design, illogic, and annoyance [...] that exudes no passion or warmth".

== Track listing ==
The Odyssey (Original Motion Picture Soundtrack) track listing
| No. | Title | Length |
|---|---|---|
| 1. | "Zeus's Law" | 3:36 |
| 2. | "Ithaca" | 5:41 |
| 3. | "Penelope" | 4:17 |
| 4. | "Telemachus" | 4:00 |
| 5. | "Calypso / Agamemnon" | 3:59 |
| 6. | "Let's Go Home" | 3:12 |
| 7. | "Cyclops" | 6:01 |
| 8. | "Menelaus, Husband of Helen" | 3:49 |
| 9. | "Troy" | 6:14 |
| 10. | "Laestrygonians" | 5:02 |
| 11. | "Circe" (featuring Samantha Morton) | 7:36 |
| 12. | "Hades" | 10:33 |
| 13. | "Loyal to the Future" | 5:21 |
| 14. | "Sirens" | 2:39 |
| 15. | "Apollo's Island" | 4:32 |
| 16. | "7 Years" | 2:16 |
| 17. | "Another Name" | 1:51 |
| 18. | "Bringing It All" | 8:01 |
| 19. | "Welcome Home Stranger" | 5:51 |
| 20. | "Odysseus" | 8:42 |
| 21. | "The Trial of the Bow / Vengeance" | 6:14 |
| 22. | "Chasing the Escaping Sun" | 3:21 |
| 23. | "When I'm Home" (with James Blake and Travis Scott) | 5:27 |
| Total length: | | 118:15 |

== Credits ==
Credits adapted from liner notes:

- Music composer and producer: Ludwig Göransson
- Score producer: Serena Göransson
- Music editors: Alex Gibson, Felipe Pacheco
- Additional music editor: Rebecca Shrand
- Additional arrangements: Noah Gorelick
- Music programming: Andrew Aasemokai, Caroline Ho
- Studios: Abbey Road Studios, AK Records, Conway Recording Studios, Elbo Studios, Kuzum Baba, Real World Studios
- Recording and mixing: Riley Mackin
- Engineers: Bob Mackenzie, Dan Shutt, John Armstrong
- Mastering: Heba Kadry
- Music preparation: Fine Line Music Service
- Librarians: Gregory Jamrok, Abraham Libbos, Samuel Stadler, Josef Zimmerman
- Sound design: Anthony Baldino, Christopher Lane
- Score recordist: Oliver Hiddleton
- Score coordinator: Queenie Li
- Archaemusicologists: Callum Armstrong, Rosa Fragorapt
- Ethnomusicologist: Vasil S. Tole
- Contractors: Isobel Griffiths Ltd., Kelci Hahn, Jodie Landau
- Choir conductors: Alexander Lloyd Blake, Jodie Landau
- Traditional Iso-polyphonic songs arrangements and performer: Të rinjtë e Delvinës
- Aulos: Callum Armstrong
- Fyell: Vendim Kapaj
- Lyre: Rosa Fragorapti
- Vocalists: James Blake, Flora Nolan

== Charts ==
Chart performance for The Odyssey (Original Motion Picture Soundtrack)
| Chart (2026) | Peak position |
|---|---|
| Austrian Albums (Ö3 Austria) | 39 |
| Belgian Albums (Ultratop Flanders) | 9 |
| Belgian Albums (Ultratop Wallonia) | 11 |
| French Albums (SNEP) | 29 |
| German Albums (Offizielle Top 100) | 23 |
| Irish Independent Albums (IRMA) | 12 |
| Italian Physical Albums (FIMI) | 13 |
| Japanese Download Albums (Billboard Japan) | 52 |
| Portuguese Streaming Albums (AFP) | 172 |
| Scottish Albums (Official Charts) | 25 |
| Swiss Albums (Schweizer Hitparade) | 43 |
| UK Albums Sales (Official Charts) | 38 |
| UK Independent Albums (Official Charts) | 11 |
| UK Soundtrack Albums (Official Charts) | 1 |
| US Independent Albums (Billboard) | 47 |
| US Soundtrack Albums (Billboard) | 6 |
