= The Womack Sisters =

American girl group

- Origin: United States
- Genres: R&B; Soul
- Years active: 2014–present
- Label: Daptone
- Members: Zeimani Womack; Zekkujcha "Kucha" Womack; Zekuumba "BG" Womack

The Womack Sisters are an American girl group consisting of sisters Zeimani Womack, Zekkujcha "Kucha" Womack, and Zekuumba "BG" Womack. The daughters of musicians Linda and Cecil Womack, they began performing together following the formation of Ejyptsian Queen by BG and Zeimani in 2001, and moved to Los Angeles in 2007 to pursue careers in music. They subsequently worked as background vocalists, songwriters, and vocal arrangers before forming The Womack Sisters as a trio. The group released the EP Legacy in 2022 and their self-titled debut studio album in 2026, which reached the top ten of the UK Download Chart and the UK Independent Albums Chart.

== History ==
Zeimani, Zekkujcha, and Zekuumba Womack are daughters of musicians Linda and Cecil Womack, members of the R&B duo Womack & Womack, and nieces of singer Bobby Womack and granddaughters of singer Sam Cooke. The sisters were raised "between London, Thailand, Paris and Amsterdam," and spent part of their childhood accompanying their parents during their international touring and recording activities, later performing with them. Their parents encouraged them to pursue careers in music and involved them from an early age in their studio work and other aspects of their professional activities. In 1993, the sisters made their recording debut with their four other siblings on their parents' album Transformation to the House of Zekkariyas.

In 2001, BG and Zeimani formed the group Ejyptsian Queen with another sister. The group released an album under the name Ejyptsian Queen. In 2007, the sisters moved to Los Angeles, where they pursued careers as singers, songwriters and vocal arrangers, after attempts to balance regular jobs with getting a musical career off the ground. Following the deaths of Cecil Womack in 2013 and Bobby Womack in 2014, BG and Zeimani continued performing with Kucha under the name The Womack Sisters. The group subsequently intensified work as background vocalists, in addition to writing and arranging music for artists including Solange Knowles, Mýa, Eddie Murphy, and The Game, while also seeking a recording contract.

In 2017, the trio released the single "Darling," with subsequent recordings including material incorporating both traditional soul influences and contemporary R&B production. The group self-released the EP Legacy in 2022. Later, The Womack Sisters began working with producer and Daptone Records co-founder Gabe Roth. Their collaboration resulted in several recordings, including "If I Let You" and "Chauffeur," which were later selected to be included on their self-titled debut studio album, released by Daptone Records on August 14, 2026. The album peaked at number 25 on the Scottish Albums Chart and reached the top ten on both the UK Download Chart and the UK Independent Albums Chart.

== Discography ==
List of studio album, with selected details
Title	Details	Peak chart positions	
Title	Details	SCO	UK Indie
The Womack Sisters	Released: August 14, 2026; Label: Daptone; Format: CD, streaming, download	25	9

=== Extended plays ===
List of extended plays, with selected details
Title	Details
Legacy	Released: September 9, 2022; Label: Great Pyramid; Format: Streaming, digital download
