= Grammy Award for Best Latin Song =

Award presented by the Recording Academy

- Awarded for: Quality Latin songs
- Presented by: National Academy of Recording Arts and Sciences
- First award: 2027
- Currently held by: TBA
- Website: grammy.com

The Grammy Award for Best Latin Song is an award presented by the Recording Academy to honor quality Latin music compositions in any given year. The award will be presented for the first time at the 69th Annual Grammy Awards in 2027, and sits in the Latin, Global, African, Reggae & New Age, Ambient or Chant field. The Academy announced the new category in June 2026, stating that the award “recognizes the achievement of “newly-written Latin songs predominantly in Spanish.”

The award goes to the songwriter(s).

== Background ==
The category was established partially as a response to Bad Bunny's Debí Tirar Más Fotos winning Album of the Year at the 2026 ceremony, and as a way for the Academy to honor Latin songwriters, who did not have a dedicated award within the Latin field.

Best Traditional Pop Vocal Performance was announced on June 16, 2026 alongside Best Asian Pop Music Performance, Best R&B Collaboration or Duo/Group Performance, Best Traditional Folk Album, and Best Traditional Pop Vocal Performance. Of the announcement, Recording Academy CEO Harvey Mason Jr. stated, "2027 is going to be an amazing year for the Grammy Awards, and one that reflects the extraordinary growth we're seeing across music. The changes advanced by our Recording Academy members speak to the breadth of today's music industry and the many genres, crafts and creators shaping it. We're excited to see these updates come to life in the year ahead as we celebrate the music people who are driving music forward".

== Eligibility ==
According to the Recording Academy's rulebook for the 2027 ceremony, eligible songs must be predominantly in the Spanish language, with at least 51% of the lyrics being Spanish. The songs may be from any subgenre of Latin music, including Latin pop, Música Mexicana, Música urbana, tropical Latin, Latin rock, and Latin alternative as long as they meet the language requirement and were released within the eligibility period for that year's Grammys.

== Recipients ==
Year	Song	Songwriter(s)	Artist(s)
2027
2027	"Ahí"	Aubrey Drake Graham, Carolina Giraldo Navarro, Kevyn Mauricio Cruz Moreno and Daniel Echavarría Oviedo	Karol G and Drake
2027	"¿Cómo se ama?"	Jorge Drexler	Jorge Drexler
2027	"Hasta Jesús Tuvo un Mal Día"	Rafa Arcaute, Renee Barri, Catriel Guerreiro, Ulises Guerriero, Martin Kierszenbaum, John Ryan, Gordon Matthew Thomas Sumner, Vicente Jimenez “Vibarco” & Federico Vindver	Ca7riel & Paco Amoroso and Sting
2027	"La Perla"	Noah Goldstein, David Rodríguez, Rosalía Vila Tobella, Ryan Tedder & Dylan Wiggins	Rosalía and Yahritza y su Esencia
2027	"Niño"	Santiago Alvarado, Mario Del Transito Cocomarola, Camilo Joaquín Villarruel, Gregorio Armando Reinaldo Nelli & Santiago Ruiz	Milo J

^{^[I]} Each year is linked to the article about the Grammy Awards held that year.
