= The Mandalorian and Grogu (soundtrack) =

2026 film score by Ludwig Göransson

The Mandalorian and Grogu – Original Motion Picture Soundtrack

Film score by Ludwig Göransson
- Released: May 15, 2026
- Genre: Soundtrack
- Length: 73:35
- Label: Walt Disney
- Producer: Ludwig Göransson

Ludwig Göransson chronology
Sinners (2025)	The Mandalorian and Grogu – Original Motion Picture Soundtrack (2026)	The Odyssey (2026)

The Mandalorian and Grogu – Original Motion Picture Soundtrack is the film score to the 2026 film of the same name composed and produced by Ludwig Göransson. The soundtrack album was released in both digital formats by Walt Disney Records on May 15, 2026, and was released on a special edition 10-inch vinyl on May 22.

== Background ==
Ludwig Göransson was confirmed in September 2025 to be composing the score for the film, returning to the franchise after he composed for the first two seasons of The Mandalorian and provided themes for the third. Scoring sessions took place during the first half of January 2026 at the Fox Studio Lot in Los Angeles. A remix of the film's main theme by electronic musician Boys Noize was released on May 1. A soundtrack album featuring Göransson's score was released digitally by Walt Disney Records on May 15. A 12-inch vinyl album with 13 cues from the soundtrack was released on June 5, and a special edition 10-inch vinyl in the shape of the Mandalorian's helmet, featuring two new score cues, was released on May 22.

== Track listing ==
All music is composed by Ludwig Göransson.

No.	Title	Length
1.	"This Is the Way"	8:15
2.	"The Mandalorian and Grogu"	3:07
3.	"Next Mission"	4:20
4.	"The Twins"	2:37
5.	"Shakari"	1:29
6.	"Hugo Durant's Snack Shack" (featuring Andreas Öberg, Luanne Homzy & Mike Valerio)	4:19
7.	"Rotta"	1:33
8.	"The Pit Fight"	6:39
9.	"Rotta Chase"	3:26
10.	"Tracking Lord Janu"	3:20
11.	"Strap In"	2:48
12.	"Flying Home to Nevarro"	1:01
13.	"Embo"	1:59
14.	"We Got to Find Him"	4:11
15.	"The Helmet"	4:09
16.	"Go Kid"	3:00
17.	"Grogu's World"	7:45
18.	"Do We Run? Or Do We Fight?"	6:40
19.	"All Weapons Hot"	3:39
20.	"Red Jammer"	1:54
21.	"Your Turn, Grogu"	1:44
Total length:		1:13:35

== Charts ==
Chart performance for The Mandalorian and Grogu – Original Motion Picture Soundtrack
Chart (2026)	Peak position
French Albums (SNEP)	198
Japanese Albums (Oricon)	38
Japanese Digital Albums (Oricon)	11
Japanese Download Albums (Billboard Japan)	10
Japanese Top Albums Sales (Billboard Japan)	29
Scottish Albums (Official Charts)	41
UK Albums Sales (OCC)	31
UK Soundtrack Albums (Official Charts)	2
