= Grammy Award for Best Asian Pop Music Performance =

Award presented by the Recording Academy

- Awarded for: Artistic excellence in a vocal Asian pop music performance
- Presented by: National Academy of Recording Arts and Sciences
- First award: 2027
- Website: grammy.com

The Grammy Award for Best Asian Pop Music Performance is an award presented by the Recording Academy to honor quality Asian pop music performances in any given year. The award will be presented for the first time at the 69th Annual Grammy Awards in 2027, and sits in the Pop & Dance/Electronic field.

The Academy announced the new category in June 2026, stating that the award "recognizes artistic excellence in Asian pop music performances. Eligible recordings include contemporary popular music originating from or widely recognized within Asian markets, including K-Pop, J-Pop, and C-Pop. Eligible recordings typically feature melody-driven composition, mainstream pop songwriting, and commercially oriented production, as recognized within their respective markets, and may incorporate elements of pop-adjacent styles such as pop-rock, pop R&B, and other related forms. Recordings in this category are often characterized by genre-blending arrangements, layered production, and dynamic structural shifts designed to support both audio and performance-based delivery."

The award goes to the performing artist(s).

== Background ==
Prior to 2026, Asian pop music was rarely acknowledged by the Recording Academy. BTS became the first Korean artists to be nominated when their single "Dynamite" received a nod in the Best Pop Duo/Group Performance category at the 63rd Annual Grammy Awards in 2021, a feat they would repeat a year later with "Butter" and a third time for "My Universe" the year after that. "Golden" from the film K-Pop Demon Hunters became the first K-pop song to win a Grammy when it won Best Song Written for Visual Media at the 68th Annual Grammy Awards in 2025.

The category was established in response to the continued growth and expansion of Asian pop music, which the Academy described as "one of the most significant and sustained forces in the global music industry". The increasing popularity of genres including K-pop, J-pop, and Mandopop were cited as major inspirations for the creation of the category, and the Academy's members felt 2027 was the right time to introduce a specific award honoring Asian pop music in line with the genre's scale, artistry, and impact worldwide.

Best Asian Pop Music Performance was announced on June 16, 2026 alongside Best R&B Collaboration or Duo/Group Performance, Best Traditional Pop Vocal Performance, Best Traditional Folk Album, and Best Latin Song. Of the announcement, Recording Academy CEO Harvey Mason Jr. stated, "2027 is going to be an amazing year for the Grammy Awards, and one that reflects the extraordinary growth we're seeing across music. The changes advanced by our Recording Academy members speak to the breadth of today's music industry and the many genres, crafts and creators shaping it. We're excited to see these updates come to life in the year ahead as we celebrate the music people who are driving music forward".

On July 28, 2026, the members of BTS announced that they would not be submitting their album, Arirang, or its songs for consideration at the 69th Annual Grammys. In a joint statement posted on all seven members' Instagram accounts, the group commented: "We have decided not to submit for Grammy consideration this year. We hope our music can be heard and loved for what it is, rather than being divided by region or language. We thank Army and everyone who has always stood by us." Mason said that he was saddened by BTS's decision and that the category was not meant to divide. Following BTS's decision, the Grammys website removed live recordings of BTS's performances at previous years' ceremonies. On October 2, JYP Entertainment announced that Stray Kids had chosen to not submit music.

== Eligibility ==
According to the Recording Academy's rulebook for the 2027 ceremony, eligible recordings must feature meaningful use of one or more Asian languages and that the language must be identifiable within songs that are bilingual or multilingual. Recordings that are performed entirely in an Asian language are eligible, but recordings that are primarily sung in a non-Asian language and only feature minimal or incidental use of Asian languages, such as ad-libs, brief phrases, or isolated words, are not eligible. The rules are clear that "the musical style is determinative of eligibility, not the ethnicity or nationality of the performer(s)", and that recordings performed entirely in English or other languages by Asian performers are eligible in other categories, but not in Best Asian Pop Music Performance. Additionally, other recordings that meet the language criteria but do not meet the genre criteria are instead eligible in other categories, including Best Global Music Performance or other genre categories.

== Recipients ==
Year^{[I]}	Artist(s)	Work
2027
2027	Babymetal featuring Polyphia	"Sunset Kiss"
2027	Bini	"Unang Kilig"
2027	Ive	"Bang Bang"
2027	KiiiKiii	"404 (New Era)"
2027	LiSA	"Yes"
2027	SB19	"Visa"

^{^[I]} Each year is linked to the article about the Grammy Awards held that year.
