= The Brown Singers =

Gospel group

The Brown Singers is a family gospel group from Columbus, Ohio consisting of four sisters and one brother. Their mother Doris L. Brown trained and accompanied the group. Under her musical direction, The Brown Sisters were three time winners on the Ted Mack's Original Amateur Hour. The group has toured with the Chicago Brass Quintet where Doris L. Brown was the featured soloist.

In 1965 the group performed and were appointed Ambassadors of Good Will at the New York's World Fair.

The Brown Singers along with the Ebenezer Baptist Church Mass Choir have produced 19 live recording albums. The ninth album "The Uncloudy Day" was nominated for the Dove Award by the National Gospel Music Association in Nashville, Tennessee. The twelfth album entitled "You've Done It Once Again" was nominated for the Columbus Gospel Music Excellence Award.
