= The Fiddle and the Drum (Renée Fleming and Béla Fleck album) =

Studio album by Renée Fleming with Béla Fleck
- Released: May 29, 2026
- Recorded: 2023–2025, Nashville, Tennessee
- Genres: Americana; folk; bluegrass
- Label: Thirty Tigers
- Producer: Béla Fleck

Singles from The Fiddle and the Drum
- 1. "In the Pines" Released: March 20, 2026; 2. "My Epitaph" Released: April 22, 2026

The Fiddle and the Drum is a collaborative album by American soprano Renée Fleming and American banjo player Béla Fleck. It was released via Thirty Tigers on May 29, 2026 and was produced by Fleck. The project includes guest appearances from Dolly Parton, Vince Gill, Jerry Douglas, Aoife O'Donovan, Sierra Hull, and Sarah Jarosz. It was preceded by the release of the singles "In the Pines" with Parton, and "My Epitaph".

== Background ==
The album was announced on March 20, 2026. Despite being known as an opera star, Fleming explained that she has a long-held love of American folk and Appalachian music, and had first discussed recording an album with Fleck at least two decades prior, but that busy schedules kept them from focusing on the project until 2023, when work on the album officially began in Nashville, Tennessee, with Fleck serving as producer.

The first single from the album, a version of the traditional folk song "In the Pines" featuring Dolly Parton was released alongside the album's announcement. Fleming described it as "a dream" to sing with Parton, while Fleck stated "I have always loved her [Parton’s] pristine sound, and her iconic status is no accident — her artistry and goodness come through in every beautiful note. It’s the same spirit that drives her constant, creative philanthropy. Pure music, heart, generosity, and authenticity — all in the same remarkable person". Parton added that she was "so happy" to join Fleming and Fleck on the song and explained that, "I grew up singing that song in the Smoky Mountains, then I sang it with my family on my TV show back in the ’70s, and then years later I released it on my Heartsongs album. I love that I get to do it again, this time as a duet with Renée Fleming".

Fleming and Fleck will promote the album with a series of special live performances, including appearances at the Telluride Bluegrass Festival, Spoleto Festival, Chautauqua Institution, the Grand Ole Opry, and Carnegie Hall.

The second single, "My Epitaph", was released on April 22, 2026, with Aoife O'Donovan providing harmony vocals. Regarding the song, Fleck stated, "this is an example of how you can say so much in a simple folk song. It's a great place to post someone's creed, as Ola Belle did so elegantly here", while Fleming added, "the message of the song, summed up in the lyric, 'what we'd do for each other, let us do it today,' is so wise, and bears repeating now, when loneliness has become an actual epidemic. Aoife's harmonizations add so much richness. It's amazing how, in this music, a handful of players can bring so many textures and colours to a song".

== Track listing ==
The Fiddle and the Drum track listing
No.	Title	Writer(s)	Length
1.	"He's Gone Away/The Storms Are on the Ocean"	A. P. Carter; Béla Fleck	6:10
2.	"In the Pines" (featuring Dolly Parton)	Traditional	4:47
3.	"The Fiddle and the Drum" (featuring Jerry Douglas)	Joni Mitchell	5:08
4.	"My Epitaph"	Ola Belle Reed	3:23
5.	"The Scarlet Tide" (featuring Vince Gill)	T Bone Burnett; Elvis Costello	3:41
6.	"The Cuckoo" (featuring Jerry Douglas)	Traditional	4:49
7.	"Blackest Crow" (featuring Aoife O'Donovan)	Fleck	4:47
8.	"Scarlet Ribbons"	Evelyn Danzig; Jack Segal	3:37
9.	"He's Gone Away (Reprise)"	Fleck	1:48
10.	"Pretty Bird" (featuring Sierra Hull and Sarah Jarosz)	Hazel Dickens	3:55

== Personnel ==
Credits are adapted from Tidal.

- Renée Fleming – lead vocals
- Béla Fleck – banjo, production, mixing
- Jerry Douglas – Dobro guitar, lead vocals on "The Cuckoo"
- Mike Bub – bass guitar
- Stuart Duncan – fiddle
- Sam Bush – mandolin
- Bryan Sutton – guitar
- Dave Sinko – engineering
- Paul Blakemore – mastering
- Dolly Parton – lead vocals on "In the Pines"
- Vince Gill – lead vocals on "The Scarlet Tide"
- Aoife O'Donovan – lead vocals on "Blackest Crow"
- Sierra Hull – lead vocals on "Pretty Bird"
- Sarah Jarosz – lead vocals on "Pretty Bird"

== Charts ==
Chart performance for The Fiddle and the Drum
Chart (2026)	Peak position
US Top Classical Albums (Billboard)	2
US Top Classical Crossover Albums (Billboard)	2
