= Nu King =

Studio album by Jason Derulo
- Released: February 16, 2024
- Genres: Pop; R&B
- Length: 78:16
- Label: Atlantic
- Producers: Ali Payami; Ali Prawl; Andrew Wells; Badmarks; Bantu; Benjmn; CRVS Serrano; David Guetta; Digi; Dom Did It; Elof; Emanuel Kiriakou; Hoops; Jayme Silverstein; Jintae Ko; Johnny Goldstein; Jonny Grande; Killah B; King Vay; KJ; Koko Got Sauce; Larry LeTwins; Mac & Phil; Mally Mall; Melvin Moore; Mike Hawkins; Nuka; Pink Slip; Pip Kembo; Pressplay; Punctual; Rice N' Peas; Ricky Reed; R3hab; Saltwives; Scorp Dezel; Simon Says; Smash David; Stryv; Stvnley; Teemu Brunila; Tesher; Toby Green; Vassal Benford; YX

Jason Derulo chronology
2Sides (Side 1) (2019)	Nu King (2024)

Singles from Nu King
- 1. "Spicy Margarita" Released: January 26, 2024

Nu King is the fifth studio album by American singer Jason Derulo. It was released on February 16, 2024, through Atlantic Records. His first studio album of original material in nearly nine years, following Everything Is 4 (2015), it marks the longest gap between studio albums. It features collaborations with Michael Bublé, YoungBoy Never Broke Again, Gucci Mane, Quavo, Lay Bankz, Tesher, Robinson, the late Mikaben, David Guetta, Alexandra Shipp, and Nuka, alongside guest appearances from Nicki Minaj, Ty Dolla Sign, French Montana, Adam Levine, Dido, and Meghan Trainor. It serves as a follow-up to his EP 2Sides (Side 1) (2019), and is his first project not released through longtime labels Beluga Heights and Warner, which he left in 2020 due to creative differences.

== Critical reception ==
Maura Johnston of Rolling Stone described Derulo as an "audacious, occasionally ridiculous Pop-R&B smoothie" on the record, but concluded that "on a 27-song album, they can't all be hits".

== Track listing ==
Nu King track listing
No.	Title	Writer(s)	Producer(s)	Length
1.	"Nu King"	Jason Desrouleaux; Brian Bates; Aliandro Prawl	Killah B; Ali Prawl	1:34
2.	"Spicy Margarita" (with Michael Bublé)	Desrouleaux; Michael Bublé; Matthew Garcia; Roberto Diaz; Shawn Charles; Sean Douglas; Benjamin Shapiro; Jonathan Bach; Alexander Pavelich; Jamal Rashid; Matthew Holmes; Phil Leigh; Hamid Bashir; Luis Demetrio; Pablo Beltrán Ruiz; Norman Gimbel	Mac & Phil; Stryv	2:34
3.	"Mad Love" (with YoungBoy Never Broke Again)	Desrouleaux; Kentrell Gaulden; Garcia; Diaz; Charles; Dana Victoria; Mariah Rose Martinez	Mally Mall; Scorp Dezel; Jayme Silverstein; R3hab; Vassal Benford	3:30
4.	"U + I"	Desrouleaux; Garcia; Diaz	Mally Mall; YX; Benford; Dom Did It	2:59
5.	"Lie to Me"	Desrouleaux; Charles; Ali Payami	Payami	3:21
6.	"Favorite Song"	Desrouleaux; Garcia; Diaz; Jason Reeves; Pavelich; Samantha DeRosa; Jonah Summerfield	Mally Mall; Hoops; Badmarks; KJ	2:36
7.	"POV"	Desrouleaux; John Thomas Roach; Charlie Snyder; Andrew Wells; Jintae Ko	Ko; Wells; Jonny Grande	3:44
8.	"Last Night" (with Gucci Mane and Quavo)	Desrouleaux; Radric Davis; Quavious Marshall; Garcia; Pavelich; Rashid; Rel	Mally Mall; Smash David; CRVS Serrano; King Vay; Benford; Melvin Moore; Pressplay	2:22
9.	"Take You Dancing"	Desrouleaux; Sarah Solovay; Charles; Emanuel Kiriakou; Teemu Brunila	Kiriakou; Brunila	3:10
10.	"Don't Go Nowhere"	Desrouleaux; Garcia; Charles; Kyle Harrington; Melvin Moore; Rashid	Mally Mall; Stvnley; Benford; YX; Dom Did It	2:46
11.	"Proximity"	Desrouleaux; Garcia; Diaz; Victoria Quartararo; Rashid	Mally Mall; YX; Benford; Dom Did It	3:21
12.	"Limbo" (with Lay Bankz)	Desrouleaux; Lay Bankz; Charles; Eric Bellinger; Jakob Erixson; Brittany McCants; Arthur Redmond; Tyson Kong; Bashir; Shapiro	Stryv; Benjmn	2:22
13.	"Jalebi Baby" (with Tesher)	Hitesh Sharma; Desrouleaux	Tesher	2:49
14.	"Comatose"	Desrouleaux; Garcia; Diaz	Mally Mall; Digi; Simon Says	2:44
15.	"Slow Low"	Desrouleaux; Charles; Ross Golan; Jackson Morgan; Anthony Watts; Kyle Buckley; John Larkin; Antonio Catania	Pink Slip	3:04
16.	"Swalla" (featuring Nicki Minaj and Ty Dolla Sign)	Desrouleaux; Onika Maraj; Tyrone Griffin Jr.; Jacob Kasher Hindlin; Gamal Lewis; Eric Frederic; Russell Jones; Robert Diggs	Ricky Reed	3:36
17.	"Tip Toe" (featuring French Montana)	Desrouleaux; Karim Kharbouch; Rosina Russell; John Mitchell; Philip Kembo; Tinashe Sibanda	Pip Kembo; Bantu	3:07
18.	"Lifestyle" (featuring Adam Levine)	Desrouleaux; Adam Levine; Hindlin; Amy Allen; Pablo Bowman; Casey Smith; Natalie Salomon; Kevin White; Michael Woods	Rice N' Peas	2:33
19.	"When Love Sucks" (featuring Dido)	Desrouleaux; Dido Armstrong; Charles; Yonatan Goldstein; Morgan; Bach; Buckley; Paul Herman	Pink Slip	2:49
20.	"Save the Last Dance"	Desrouleaux; Charles; Payami	Payami	3:33
21.	"Ayo Girl" (Haitian Konpa remix; with Robinson and Mikaben)	Desrouleaux; Robinson; Michael Benjamin	Larry LeTwins	2:14
22.	"Down" (with David Guetta)	Desrouleaux; David Guetta; Charles; Jacob Luttrell; Goldstein; Mikkel Cox; Tobias Frederiksen; Hamilton Bohannon	Guetta; Johnny Goldstein; Mike Hawkins; Toby Green	2:09
23.	"So Many Hearts"	Desrouleaux; Sam Martin; Nate Merchant; Goldstein	Goldstein	2:33
24.	"Hands on Me" (featuring Meghan Trainor)	Meghan Trainor; Charles; Solovay; Bach; Buckley; Elof Loelv; Ben E. King; Jerry Leiber; Mike Stoller	Pink Slip; Elof	3:03
25.	"Underwater" (with Alexandra Shipp)	Desrouleaux; Karen Thornton; Prawl; Kandace Ferrel	Ali P; Koko Got Sauce	4:13
26.	"Love Not War (The Tampa Beat)" (with Nuka)	Desrouleaux; Ridge Manuka Maukava; Charles; Hindlin	Nuka	3:11
27.	"Acapulco"	Desrouleaux; Madison Love; Henry Tucker; John Morgan; Will Lansley; Alex Oriet; David Phelan	Punctual; Saltwives	2:19
Total length:				78:16

== Charts ==
Chart performance for Nu King
Chart (2024)	Peak position
Belgian Albums (Ultratop Flanders)	88
Belgian Albums (Ultratop Wallonia)	182
Canadian Albums (Billboard)	58
French Albums (SNEP)	123
Norwegian Albums (VG-lista)	35
Portuguese Albums (AFP)	114
Swiss Albums (Schweizer Hitparade)	93
UK Albums (Official Charts)	69
US Billboard 200	82

== Certifications ==
Certifications for Nu King
Region	Certification	Certified units/sales
Canada (Music Canada)	Platinum	80,000^{‡}
Netherlands (NVPI)	Platinum	37,200^{‡}
United Kingdom (BPI)	Silver	60,000^{‡}
United States (RIAA)	Gold	500,000^{‡}
^{‡} Sales+streaming figures based on certification alone.
