= Hands on Me (Jason Derulo song) =

2023 single by Jason Derulo and Meghan Trainor

Single by Jason Derulo featuring Meghan Trainor
- Released: October 13, 2023
- Genre: Doo-wop
- Length: 3:03
- Label: Atlantic
- Songwriters: Jason Derulo; Meghan Trainor; J Bach; Sarah Solovay; Shawn Charles; Kyle Buckley; Elof Loelv; Ben E. King; Jerry Leiber; Mike Stoller
- Producers: Elof; Pink Slip

Jason Derulo singles chronology
"Lemons" (2023)	"Hands on Me" (2023)	"Closer to Christmas" (2023)

Meghan Trainor singles chronology
"Mr Right" (2023)	"Hands on Me" (2023)	"Wrap Me Up" (2023)

Music video
- "Hands on Me" on YouTube

"Hands on Me" is a song by American singer Jason Derulo, featuring American singer-songwriter Meghan Trainor, included on the former's fifth studio album, Nu King (2024). They wrote the song with J Bach, Sarah Solovay, Shawn Charles, and the producers, Elof and Pink Slip, with Ben E. King, Jerry Leiber, and Mike Stoller receiving credits due to the interpolation of "Stand by Me" (1961). Atlantic Records released it as a single on October 13, 2023. A doo-wop song in the style of Trainor's usual music, it describes a romance between Derulo and his neighbor as he invites her over to his house.

Music critics were negative about the interpolation, as well as the production and lyrics of "Hands on Me". The song reached number 20 on the New Zealand Hot Singles chart, number 24 in Croatia, and number 121 on the South Korea BGM chart. The accompanying music video features an appearance by Paris Hilton, and it depicts Derulo and Trainor adapting to living on a farm. Derulo performed a medley of the song with his 2020 single "Take You Dancing" at the season 18 finale of America's Got Talent. The song was reprised on his 2024 concert tour, the Nu King World Tour.

== Background and release ==
Jason Derulo and Meghan Trainor first collaborated on the track "Painkiller" from Derulo's 2015 album Everything Is 4. The following year, Trainor released the song "Me Too" as a single, which was co-written by Derulo. Derulo spoke fondly about the experience of collaborating with her: "She's a sweetie, she's crazy, and we got along really well. I think that song was perfect for her because it's about loving yourself and not worrying about what haters say. It's just a dope, fun song." Derulo and Trainor both achieved popularity on video-sharing service TikTok in subsequent years; Derulo achieved the viral song "Savage Love (Laxed – Siren Beat)" (2020), while Trainor experienced commercial success with her viral TikTok song "Made You Look" (2022).

After Derulo had the idea of interpolating the 1961 song "Stand by Me" on a new song, producer Pink Slip sent him a beat which Derulo thought was "the perfect blend of old and new". He sought out Trainor's involvement due to its doo-wop nature which resembled her signature sound, and she sent him her verse two days later. Derulo and Trainor wrote the song, titled "Hands on Me", with J Bach, Sarah Solovay, Shawn Charles, Kyle Buckley, and Elof Loelv, with Ben E. King, Jerry Leiber, and Mike Stoller receiving credits due to the interpolation. He first performed a medley of it with his 2020 single "Take You Dancing" at the finale of season 18 of America's Got Talent. The song was released as a single by Atlantic Records on October 13, 2023. Warner Music Group sent it for radio airplay in Italy on October 20. "Hands on Me" reached number 20 on the New Zealand Hot Singles chart, number 24 in Croatia, and number 121 on the South Korea BGM chart. In February 2024, the song was included on Derulo's fifth studio album, Nu King, and reprised on its 2024 supporting concert tour.

== Composition and lyrics ==
"Hands on Me"
"Hands on Me" has an old-school doo-wop production with influences of bubblegum. It interpolates "Stand by Me" during the chorus and the line "I won't be afraid".

"Hands on Me" is three minutes and three seconds long. Pink Slip produced the song with Loelv and provided drum programming. He played the keyboards and bass, and Jackson Morgan played the guitar. Dale Becker mastered it, and Jonny Grande handled mixing. Musically, "Hands on Me" has an old-school sound which resembles Trainor's usual doo-wop-inspired music, with influences of bubblegum. Sydney Brasil of Exclaim! described it as "pseudo-retro-pop" with a "typical crispy Top 40 vocal production". The interpolation of "Stand by Me" occurs during the line "I won't be afraid" and in the chorus, during the titular lyrics: "Baby, put your hands on me / Both hands on me / Right now, you're the only one I need".

In the lyrics of "Hands on Me", Derulo describes his neighbor as "the girl next door" and invites her over to his house in case she "wants some sugar". He then discusses an incident where she came over dressed in just a robe and took it off after entering his house. During her verse, Trainor states that it has "been such a long time since I been lucky", a reference to her being unable to have sex for a while in real life due to pelvic floor damage.

== Reception and promotion ==
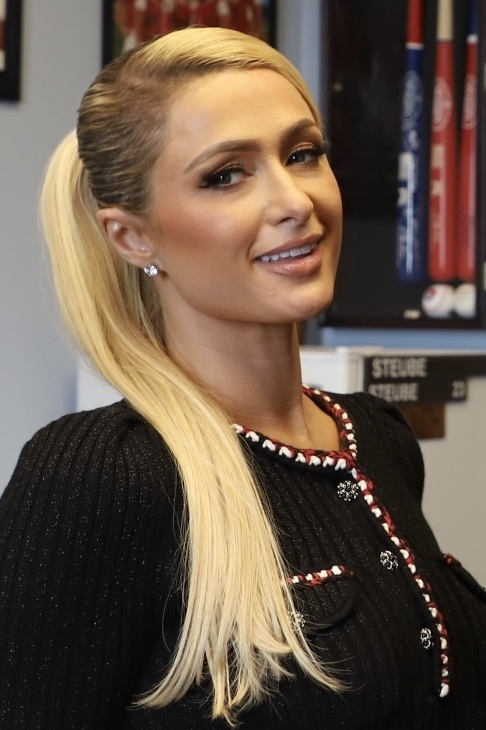
Paris Hilton (pictured in 2021) appears in the music video for "Hands on Me".

Critics were generally negative about the interpolation of "Stand by Me". American Songwriter's Alex Hopper called "Hands on Me" a "sultry revamp" and thought it was in both Derulo and Trainor's wheelhouse. In a more negative review, Brasil described the interpolation as abysmal and the song as "horny housewife music", adding that its generic production sounded like an artificial intelligence creation and something Trainor could have released years earlier. It was included in year-end lists of the worst songs of 2023 by Rolling Stone India in the top 9 and Variety at number 13. The former magazine's Amit Vaidya believed the song "butcher[ed]" "Stand by Me" and turned it into "total rubbish", describing it as less successful than the song "Dildaara" from the 2011 Ra.One soundtrack. Chris Willman of Variety likened "Hands on Me" to a horror movie and the lyrical storyline to old-school pornography; he opined that it would not resonate with audiences over the age of nine and could potentially ruin "Stand by Me" for its listeners.

The music video for "Hands on Me" was released on December 13, 2023. Paris Hilton stars as a record label executive. In a meeting, Derulo tries to convince her about making country versions of classic songs, to which she replies: "Remakes are huge right now. Okay Jason, let's see it." In subsequent scenes, Derulo and Trainor perform several activities and adapt to living on a farm in a sitcom-like format. Derulo is attracted to his neighbor, and in one scene, vomits after she asks him to unclog her toilet. At the end, Hilton approves of the concept while using her catchphrases: "Loves it. That's hot." Vaidya called the video "moronic".

== Credits and personnel ==
Credits are adapted from Qobuz.

- Pink Slip – producer, songwriter, keyboards, bass, drum programming
- Elof Loelv – producer, songwriter
- Jason Derulo – songwriter
- Meghan Trainor – songwriter
- J Bach – songwriter
- Sarah Solovay – songwriter
- Shawn Charles – songwriter
- Ben E. King – songwriter
- Jerry Leibe – songwriter
- Mike Stoller – songwriter
- Jackson Morgan – guitar
- Dale Becker – mastering
- Jonny Grande – mixing

== Charts ==
=== Weekly charts ===
Weekly chart performance for "Hands on Me"
Chart (2023–2024)	Peak position
CIS Airplay (TopHit)	170
Croatia (HRT)	24
Lithuania Airplay (TopHit)	54
New Zealand Hot Singles (RMNZ)	20
Romania Airplay (Media Forest)	5
Romania TV Airplay (Media Forest)	8
South Korea BGM (Circle)	121
Turkey (Radiomonitor Türkiye)	8

=== Monthly charts ===
Monthly chart performance for "Hands on Me"
Chart (2023)	Peak position
Lithuania Airplay (TopHit)	78
Romania Airplay (TopHit)	20

=== Year-end charts ===
Year-end chart performance for "Hands on Me"
Chart (2023)	Position
Romania Airplay (TopHit)	139

== Release history ==
Release dates and format(s) for "Hands on Me"
Region	Date	Format(s)	Label	Ref.
Various	October 13, 2023	Digital download; streaming	Atlantic	
Italy	October 20, 2023	Radio airplay	Warner	
