= Michael Benjamin =

Michael Benjamin may refer to:

- Mike Benjamin (baseball) (born 1965), former infielder in Major League Baseball
- Michael Benjamin (politician) (born 1958), Democratic member of the New York Assembly
- Michael Benjamin (investor) (born 1969), private investor, Republican candidate for U.S. Senate in 2004
- Michael Benjamin (musician) (1981–2022), Haitian singer, songwriter and producer
