= All Me =

All Me may refer to:

- All Me (album), 2010 album by Toni Gonzaga
- "All Me" (Drake song), 2013
- All Me (Kehlani song), 2019
