= Shweta Subram =

Canadian singer

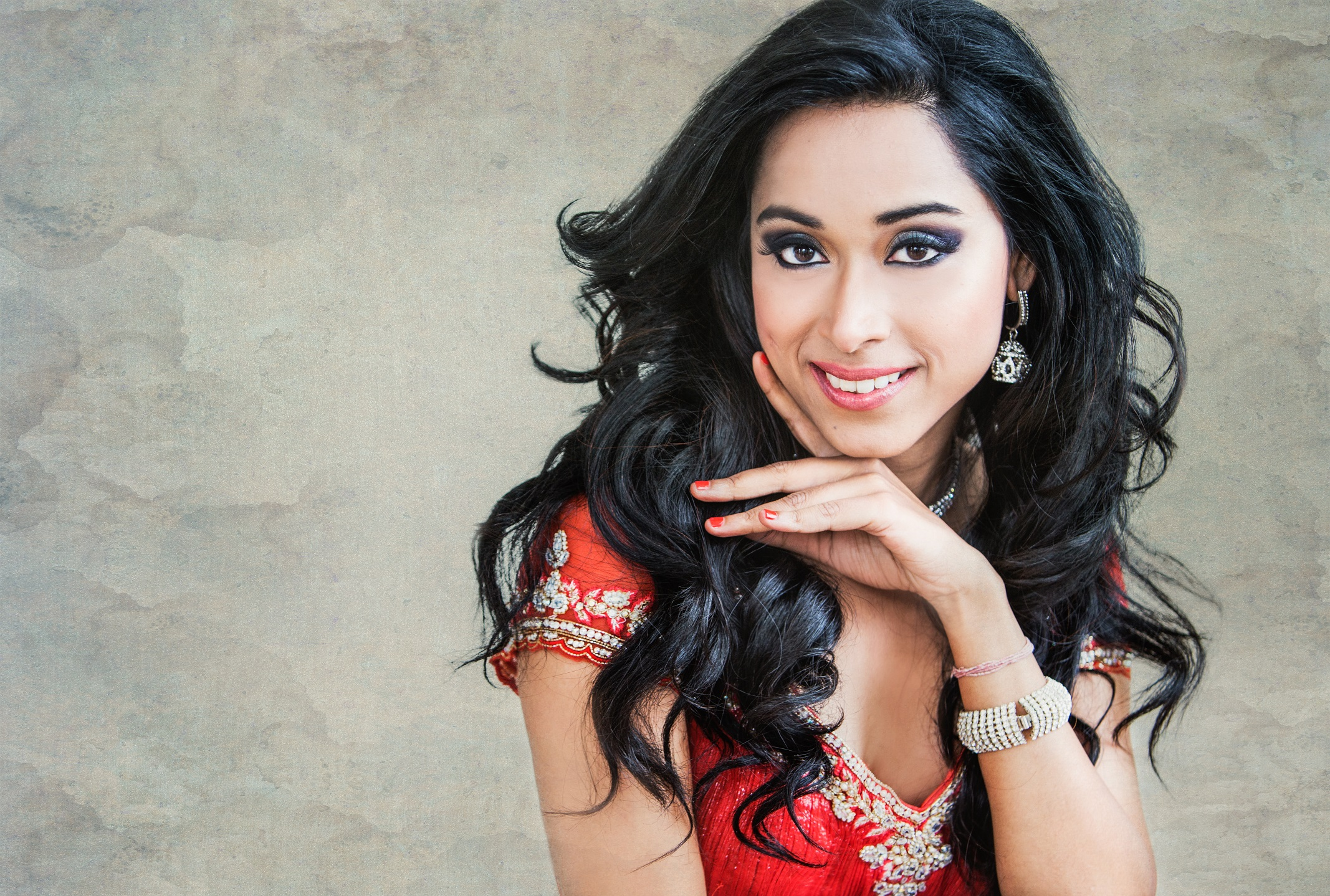

Background information
- Born: Mangalore, Karnataka, India
- Origin: Ottawa, Canada
- Genres: Bollywood, Hindi, Punjabi, playback singing
- Occupations: Singer, songwriter, performer
- Instruments: Vocals, piano
- Years active: 2011–present
- Website: www.shwetasubram.com

Kantimathi Subramanian Iyer, known professionally as Shweta Subram, is a Canadian playback singer, known for singing in the song "Jalebi Baby" (2020). She primarily sings in Hindi, as well as Punjabi, Sindhi, Tamil, English and other languages. Shweta is the recipient of multiple awards including the North American Best Singer award from Sangam Kala Group, and Best Singer Award from Shankar Mahadevan Academy's talent hunt, judged by Shankar Mahadevan himself. Shweta was an active participant in the International Indian Film Academy Awards (2011), performing with Bollywood music composer/director duo Salim–Sulaiman for IIFA Rocks in Toronto.

== Early years ==
Shweta was born in Mangalore, India but her family relocated to Dubai, UAE when she was two months old and moved to Ottawa, Ontario, Canada during her teenage years. She graduated from Merivale High School and obtained a Bachelor of Commerce (Honours) degree from Carleton University. Though singing started off as a hobby for Shweta, her talent was constantly appreciated through multiple awards and accolades in Dubai and Canada, and made way to a full time pursuit of music.

== Music career ==
After winning the North American Best Singer award from Sangam Kala Group, Shweta spent some time in India and was chosen by Zoom (TV channel) to join the Sunsilk Gang of Girls. After touring across India with the band, Shweta wanted to embark on her own musical journey.

=== Playback ===
Shweta's debut in Bollywood came through the movie Hawaizaada in 2015 starring Ayushmann Khurrana, Mithun Chakraborty, and Pallavi Sharda. Shweta sang the title song, Dil-e-Nadaan, alongside Ayushmann Khurrana, who is also the music composer for the movie alongside Rochak Kohli. Her debut in Tamil cinema came through the song "Mella Mella" for the film Maayavan (2017) starring Lavanya Tripathi and Sundeep Kishan for which music was composed by Ghibran. Shweta also sang three songs for Mostly Sunny, a biography of Sunny Leone by director Dilip Mehta.

=== Independent music ===
In addition to playback, Shweta is also an independent musician. Her debut single, Jee Le Live Life was followed up with Ajooba and these releases brought her in the urban music limelight in North America. Shweta was then contacted by Shankar Tucker to feature in his project. Mere Saajan Sun Sun, which exposed Shweta's talent to a larger audience. Shweta was then contacted by music composer Pravin Mani of A.R. Rahman fame who worked with her on the single Piya featuring the playback singer Karthik. Shweta's biggest break in North America came when she was chosen by The Piano Guys to the render an Indian adaptation of Swedish House Mafia's Don't You Worry Child. In December 2017, Shweta released a new song, Rasiya, featuring Purbayan Chatterjee on Sitar. In 2020, Shweta sang the hook Jalebi Baby for Tesher's original with the same name.

=== Bollywood covers ===
In addition to originals, Shweta has also rendered covers of popular Bollywood songs, including Heer, Saadi Galli Aaja, Mitti Di Khushboo, Kuch Na Kaho, and Jab Koi Baat. Backed by the A.R. Rahman's, Shekhar Kapur's, and Samir Bangara's digital music start-up, Qyuki, Shweta released Bollywood Evolution, which presented a medley of Bollywood songs from 1950s in five minutes in a cappella style. This release was picked up by various Indian and international news portals including BuzzFeed and The Times of India. In July 2017, when Shweta featured in a cover of Maana Ke Hum Yaar Nahin by Parineeti Chopra from the movie Meri Pyaari Bindu. Chopra took notice of the cover and tweeted that she was "speechless" and the song "made me cry".

=== Live performances ===
Shweta is known to be a rockstar performer. Her set typically includes of popular and upbeat Bollywood songs along with evergreen classics. She has headlined various festivals and concerts in North America, Middle-East, the Caribbean, and Asia. Shweta is set to headline the Ras Al Khaimah New Year's Eve for 2026 along with world's largest fireworks and drone show. In April 2015, she was invited to sing national anthems of Canada and India to open floor for speeches by Indian PM Modi and Canadian PM harper. She also headlined the IIFA Buzz (2011) festival in Markham, Ontario and The IIFA Rocks segment was aired globally by STAR (India) to a total audience of 700 million. Shweta sang the song Khuda Ke Liye with Salim–Sulaiman from the film Aazaan In March 2015, Shweta became the youngest vocalist of Indian origin to perform at the esteemed Carnegie Hall in New York. Shweta has headlined various concerts and private events across 75 cities in 12 countries.

=== Awards and honors ===
Shweta won a prestigious talent hunt by Sangam Kala Group, emerging as the Best Singer in North America in 2006. In 2011, Shweta won a global competition organized by Shankar Mahadevan Academy, and was personally mentored by Shankar Mahadevan as the winning prize. Shweta was honored as South Asian of the Year by Zee TV Canada and Maple Diversity Communications in May 2015.

== Radio ==
From 2009 to 2010 Shweta hosted the Drive Home show on HumDesi Radio, the largest radio station in North America. Prior to this she was the host and reporter of the television program "Sounds of India" on Rogers Channel 22 in Canada, and RJ for CKCU 97.9 FM (CHIN FM).

== Television ==
- Band Member, Sunsilk Gang of Girls (Zoom TV)

== Discography ==
=== Singles ===
Year of release	Song
2021	Jalebi Baby Featured vocalist for production by Tesher and Jason Derulo
2020	Jalebi Baby Featured vocalist for production by Tesher
2017	Rasiya; Purbayan Chatterjee on Sitar and Advait Nemlekar as programmer
2015	Parchan Shaal Panhwar; Produced by Sultans of Strings
2014	Bollywood Evolution
2013	Khushnuma (Don't You Worry Child); Composed by The Piano Guys
2013	Dancing Petals with Abhay Jodhpurkar, Raxstar, Raashi Kulkarni; Composed by Naiem Reza
2013	Piya ft. Karthik; Music by Pravin Mani
2012	Mere Saajan Sun Sun; Composed by Shankar Tucker
2011	Ajooba; Music by Parichay
2011	Jee Le Live Life ft. MC JD; Music by Parichay

=== Film soundtracks ===
Year	Film	Song	Notes
2018	Mostly Sunny	Ajooba, Doli	Shweta's originals featured as playback for the documentary on Sunny Leone.
2017	Maayavan	Mella Mella	Lyrics by Soundara Rajan featuring Abshek
2015	Hawaizaada	Dil-e-Nadaan	Composed by Ayushmann Khurrana and stars Ayushmann Khurrana and Pallavi Sharda
2009	Perfect Mismatch	Pehchaan Lijiye	Starring Anupam Kher, Boman Irani, and Nandana Sen, with Shweta providing the playback voice for Nandana Sen in the song Pehchaan Lijiye
2009	Bas! Beyond the Red Light (Canadian documentary)	Nacho Jhoom Jhoom Ke	Sung by Shweta and composed by Tarun Nayar of Delhi 2 Dublin
2009	I Do, Do I	I Do, Do I (title song)	produced by VikasKohli (FatLabs), out of Toronto
