= Love Not War (The Tampa Beat) =

2020 single by Jason Derulo and Nuka

Single by Jason Derulo and Nuka
- Released: November 20, 2020
- Length: 3:12
- Label: Sony
- Songwriters: Jacob Kasher; Jason Desrouleaux; Ridge Manuka Maukava; Shawn Charles
- Producer: Nuka

Jason Derulo singles chronology
"Savage Love (Laxed – Siren Beat) (BTS Remix)" (2020)	"Love Not War (The Tampa Beat)" (2020)	"Lifestyle" (2021)

Music video
- "Love Not War (The Tampa Beat)" on YouTube

"Love Not War (The Tampa Beat)" is a song by American singer Jason Derulo and New Caledonian beat maker Nuka. It was released as a single on November 20, 2020, by Sony Music, as a re-work of Nuka's "4 Brylean (WayzRmx2018)". The song was written by Jacob Kasher, Derulo, Ridge Manuka Maukava and Shawn Charles. Critics noted that the song relies on the same formula as Derulo's previous hit, "Savage Love (Laxed – Siren Beat)" (2020).

In February 2024, the song was included on Derulo's fifth studio album Nu King.

== Music video ==
A music video to accompany the release of "Love Not War" was first released onto YouTube on November 24, 2020.

== Personnel ==
Credits adapted from Tidal.

- Nuka – composer, lyricist, producer, associated performer
- Jacob Kasher – composer, lyricist
- Jason Derulo – composer, lyricist, associated performer, vocal
- Shawn Charles – composer, lyricist
- John Hanes – engineer
- Charles Gibson – guitar
- Kevin Tuffy – mastering engineer
- Serban Ghenea – mixing engineer
- Ben Hogarth – vocal engineer

== Charts ==
=== Weekly charts ===
Weekly chart performance for "Love Not War (The Tampa Beat)"
Chart (2020–2022)	Peak position
Australia (ARIA)	49
Austria (Ö3 Austria Top 40)	14
Belgium (Ultratop 50 Flanders)	15
Belgium (Ultratop 50 Wallonia)	4
Bulgaria (PROPHON)	8
Canada Hot 100 (Billboard)	92
Croatia (HRT)	20
Euro Digital Song Sales (Billboard)	6
France (SNEP)	30
Germany (GfK)	9
Global 200 (Billboard)	90
Hungary (Dance Top 40)	20
Hungary (Rádiós Top 40)	2
Hungary (Single Top 40)	16
Ireland (IRMA)	43
Netherlands (Dutch Top 40)	3
Netherlands (Single Top 100)	6
Poland Airplay (ZPAV)	1
Romania (Airplay 100)	1
Slovakia (Singles Digitál Top 100)	61
Slovakia Airplay (ČNS IFPI)	2
Slovenia (SloTop50)	32
Sweden (Sverigetopplistan)	97
Switzerland (Schweizer Hitparade)	5
UK Singles (Official Charts)	26
Ukraine Airplay (TopHit)	84

=== Year-end charts ===
2021 year-end chart performance for "Love Not War (The Tampa Beat)"
Chart (2021)	Position
Austria (Ö3 Austria Top 40)	30
Belgium (Ultratop Flanders)	57
Belgium (Ultratop Wallonia)	22
France (SNEP)	109
Germany (Official German Charts)	24
Hungary (Dance Top 40)	85
Hungary (Rádiós Top 40)	18
Hungary (Single Top 40)	90
Netherlands (Dutch Top 40)	20
Netherlands (Single Top 100)	54
Poland (ZPAV)	17
Switzerland (Schweizer Hitparade)	32

2022 year-end chart performance for "Love Not War (The Tampa Beat)"
Chart (2022)	Position
Hungary (Dance Top 40)	92

== Certifications ==
Certifications for "Love Not War (The Tampa Beat)"
Region	Certification	Certified units/sales
Australia (ARIA)	Platinum	70,000^{‡}
Austria (IFPI Austria)	2× Platinum	60,000^{‡}
Belgium (BRMA)	Gold	20,000^{‡}
Canada (Music Canada)	Platinum	80,000^{‡}
Denmark (IFPI Danmark)	Gold	45,000^{‡}
France (SNEP)	Platinum	200,000^{‡}
Germany (BVMI)	Platinum	400,000^{‡}
Italy (FIMI)	Gold	35,000^{‡}
New Zealand (RMNZ)	Gold	15,000^{‡}
Poland (ZPAV)	Platinum	20,000^{‡}
Spain (Promusicae)	Gold	30,000^{‡}
Switzerland (IFPI Switzerland)	Platinum	20,000^{‡}
United Kingdom (BPI)	Silver	200,000^{‡}
^{‡} Sales+streaming figures based on certification alone.

== See also ==
- List of Airplay 100 number ones of the 2020s
- Make love, not war
