= Baddest (Imanbek and Cher Lloyd song) =

2021 song by Imanbek & Cher Lloyd

Single by Imanbek and Cher Lloyd
- Released: 7 May 2021
- Genre: Dance
- Length: 2:55
- Label: Universal; Virgin; Effective
- Songwriters: Cher Lloyd; Imanbek; Kirill Lupinos; Jesse Finkelstei; Sarah Solovay
- Producer: Imanbek

Imanbek and Cher Lloyd singles chronology
"One Drink Away" (2020)	"Baddest" (2021)

Music video
- "Baddest" on YouTube

"Baddest" is a song by Kazakh DJ Imanbek and British singer Cher Lloyd. The single was released on 7 May 2021 as Imanbek's sixth single of 2021 and Lloyd's first single of the year.

== Background and production ==
Talking about the single, Lloyd revealed: "So excited for you to hear this one, I love this song so much! Go listen, add to your playlists and make memories." The single was teased on 5 May on Iman and Lloyd's social media with a small snippet to accompany the posts. In reciprocation to the attention building up on social media due to Iman and Lloyd promoting it on their accounts, from 6 to 7 May 2021 the song trended on Twitter globally for 48 hours with the terms "Cher Lloyd" and "Cher Lloyd Baddest" receiving over 20 thousand tweets combined.

== Critical reception and commercial performance ==
Farrel Sweeney of Dancing Astronaut stated that "'Baddest' convenes vocals from Cher Lloyd with the thrumming house notes that [Iman's] for. The single's dazzling flute melody and subtle piano notes, laced with a slow and steady bassline, set the stage for Lloyd to shine – and shine, she does."

The song failed to chart in any official weekly charts in any countries. Currently at two million streams on Spotify as of May 2021, the song managed to enter Spotify daily charts in Finland and Norway for one day at 157 and 197 respectively. However, the song fell off of the charts the following day.

== Personnel ==
Credits adapted from YouTube Music.

- Cher Lloyd – vocals, songwriting
- Imanbek – production, songwriting
- Jesse Finkelstei – songwriting
- Kirill Lupinos – songwriting
- Sarah Solovay – songwriting

== Release history ==
Release history for "Baddest"
Region	Date	Format	Label
Various	7 May 2021	Digital Download; Streaming	Universal; Virgin; Effective
