= Letters (Monica song) =

Single by Monica
- Released: June 30, 2023
- Length: 3:57
- Label: Mondeenise
- Songwriters: Monica Arnold; Brian "Killah B" Bates; Majubeen Abdullah; Tasha Catour; Alicia Renee Williams; Ciara Wilson
- Producers: Tasha Catour; Dana Johnson

Monica singles chronology
"Trusting God" (2023)	"Letters" (2023)	"The Boy Is Mine" (remix) (2024)

Music video
- "Letters" on YouTube

"Letters" is a song by American singer Monica. It was written by Monica, Ciara, Tasha Catour, Alicia Renee Williams and Brian "Killah B" Bates for her ninth studio album. Production on the track was overseen by Catour and Dana "Big Dane" Johnson. A downtempo love letter to an incarcerated lover, the song was released by Mondeenise Music as the album's fifth single on June 30, 2023. "Letters" has since reached number 11 on the US Billboard R&B Digital Song Sales chart.

== Background ==
"Letters" was written by Monica, singer Ciara, Tasha Catour, Alicia Renee Williams and Brian "Killah B" Bates for her upcoming ninth studio album, while production was overseen by Catour and Dana Johnson. On the downtempo track, Monica sings about her incarcerated lover and how much she loves him even though they can't physically be together, recognizing that she won't be able to find another man who will love and support her like him. Following its release, several publications suggested that "Letters" was supposed to be a love letter to her former lover, rapper C-Murder, who was sentenced to life in prison for the alleged 2002 murder of a 16-year-old in 2009.

== Chart performance ==
"Letters" made its debut on Billboard's US R&B Digital Song Sales chart dated for the week of July 15, 2023, reaching number 11.

== Music video ==
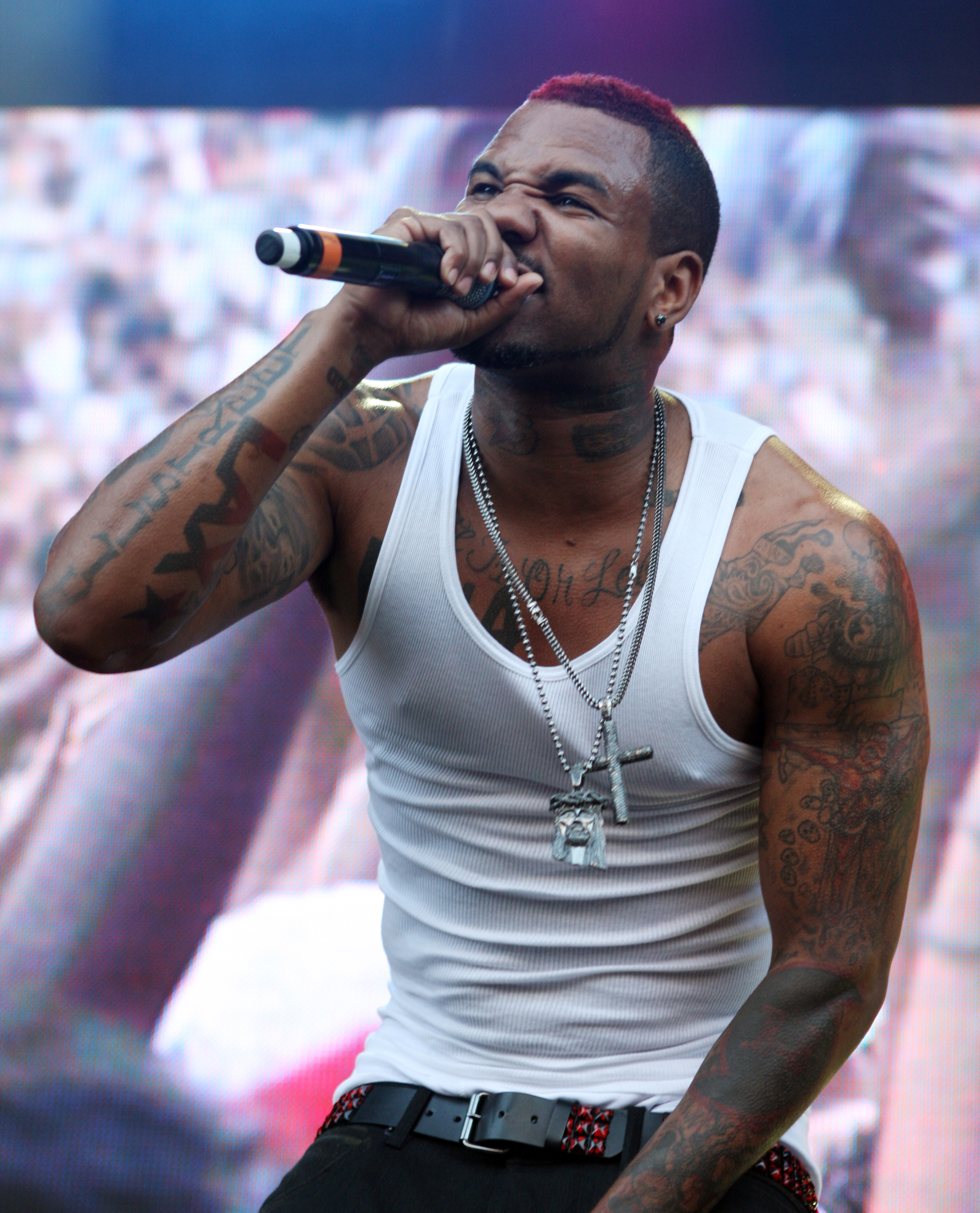
The Game appears as Monica's love interest in the video.

A music video for "Letters" was directed by Richard Selvi. American rapper The Game appears as Monica's love interest in the video. Prior to the video's release, both Monica and The Game shared snippets of it on their respective Instagram pages, including a clip of a bathtub scene.

== Charts ==
Chart performance for "Letters"
Chart (2023)	Peak position
US R&B Digital Song Sales (Billboard)	11

== Release history ==
Release dates and formats for "Letters"
Country	Date	Format	Label	Ref.
United States	June 30, 2023	Digital download; streaming	Mondeenise	
