= I Don't Wanna Be in Love (Keyshia Cole song) =

2021 song by Keyshia Cole

Single by Keyshia Cole
- Released: February 5, 2021
- Genre: R&B
- Length: 3:50
- Label: Hearts and Stars; BMG
- Songwriters: Keyshia Cole; Brian Bates
- Producers: Anthony Bell; Greg Edwards; Keyshia Cole; Ron Fair

Keyshia Cole singles chronology
"All Me" (2019)	"I Don't Wanna Be in Love" (2021)	"Forever Is a Thing" (2023)

"I Don't Wanna Be in Love" is a song by American singer Keyshia Cole. It was written by Cole and Brian Bates, with production being handled by the former alongside Anthony Bell, Greg Edwards, and Ron Fair. The song was released on February 5, 2021, through Hearts and Stars and BMG, following its preview during her and Ashanti's joint appearance on the Verzuz webcast battle series in January 2021.

An R&B ballad, "I Don't Wanna Be in Love" revolves around Cole ending a friends with benefits relationship. The song was generally praised by music critics, who complimented its lyrics and instrumentation. In the United States, the song reached number 43 on the Billboard R&B/Hip-Hop Airplay chart. An accompanying audio visualizer was released via Cole's Vevo account for promotion.

== Background and release ==
In October 2020, around three years after the release of her seventh studio album 11:11 Reset (2017), Keyshia Cole announced that she was "real close" to finishing work on her eighth album. On December 4, 2020, it was announced that Cole and fellow R&B singer Ashanti would participate in a Verzuz battle together. Cole's longtime record producer Ron Fair revealed that she would premiere a new song during the battle. The song was debuted during the last round of the battle on January 21, 2021.

Originally titled "I Don't Want to Be in Love", Cole revealed its artwork, along with the release date of February 5, 2021. The artwork displayed Cole sitting with her toes pointed forward while dressed in a red t-shirt and a pair of red and black sneakers, along with a heart wrapped in a band-aid in the corner dangling above her, symbolizing an injured heart. The song was released for digital download and streaming as the first single under Cole's independent record label, Hearts and Stars, created with the support of BMG. An audio visualizer was released to accompany the song's release. The song was released to US urban contemporary radio stations on February 13, 2021.

== Composition and lyrics ==
Musically, "I Don't Wanna Be in Love" is an R&B ballad, that lasts three minutes and 51 seconds. The song's instrumental includes a piano, bass, synthesizer, string section, and "heartstring-tugging" horns. Cole presents ad-libs and high notes throughout the song. The song was written by Cole and Brian Bates, with production being handled by the former alongside Anthony Bell, Greg Edwards, and Fair. It is about Cole ending a friends with benefits relationship, with lyrics such as "We both got a situation, hesitation, whenever we hook up, it's all love, never any expectations / I know you went much further, I met your girl, never wanna hurt her", confronting the friend about their relationship. Justin Kantor of SoulTracks described the lyrics as "true-to-life" and the production as "effectively simple". A writer from Hip Hop Weekly felt that the lyrics are describing "a dead end situationship".

== Reception ==
"I Don't Wanna Be in Love" was met with generally positive reviews from music critics. Writing for Rated R&B, Antwane Folk viewed the song as a "kiss-off anthem", while Anna-Kaye Kerr from Urban Islandz described the song as a "heartbreak anthem". Jon Powell of Revolt labeled it an "emotionally charged ballad", whereas the staff of Rap-Up found it a "brokenhearted ballad". For Rap Radar, Paul Duong interpreted that Cole "details a love hate relationship with a former lover and close friend". Ken Hamm of Soul Bounce found Cole's vocals as "topnotch" and felt that in the song, she is "afraid of getting caught up in the rapture". Alexander Cole of HotNewHipHop declared the song as "beautifully emotional" and complimented the instrumental, describing it as "gorgeous".

"I Don't Wanna Be in Love" entered the US Billboard Adult R&B Songs at number 30 on the chart issue dated February 27, 2021, where it moved up to number 29 the following week. Three weeks later, the song had risen up to number 20 and stayed at that position for the next week. Six weeks later, the song reached its peak at number 11 and spent a total of 22 weeks on the chart. While gaining traction over those weeks, it entered the US Billboard R&B/Hip-Hop Airplay chart at number 50. It later peaked at number 43 and spent a total of 11 weeks on the chart.

== Track listing ==
Digital download
No.	Title	Length
1.	"I Don't Wanna Be in Love"	3:50

== Credits and personnel ==
Credits adapted from Tidal.

- Keyshia Cole – vocals, production, composition, lyrics
- Anthony Bell – production, composition, lyrics
- Adam Schoeller – engineering
- Balewa Muhammad – composition, lyrics
- Brian Bates – production, composition, lyrics
- Greg Edwards – production, composition, lyrics
- Jahqae Muhammad – production, composition, lyrics
- Jaycen Joshua – composition, engineering, lyrics
- Pat Thrall – engineering
- Ron Fair – production, arranging, engineering, orchestral

== Charts ==
=== Weekly charts ===
Weekly chart performance for "I Don't Wanna Be in Love"
Chart (2021)	Peak position
US R&B/Hip-Hop Airplay (Billboard)	43

=== Year-end charts ===
Year-end chart performance for "I Don't Wanna Be in Love"
Chart (2021)	Position
US Adult R&B Songs (Billboard)	34

== Release history ==
Region	Date	Format	Label	Ref.
Various	February 5, 2021	Digital download; streaming	Hearts and Stars; BMG	
United States	February 13, 2021	Urban contemporary radio	Hearts and Stars; BMG	
