= Lifestyle (Jason Derulo song) =

2021 single by Jason Derulo and Adam Levine

Single by Jason Derulo featuring Adam Levine

from the album Jordi
- Released: January 21, 2021
- Length: 2:33
- Label: Future History; Artist Partner; Atlantic
- Songwriters: Jason Desrouleaux; Adam Levine; Jacob Kasher; Amy Allen; Pablo Bowman; Casey Smith; Natalie Salomon; Kevin White; Michael Woods
- Producer: Rice N' Peas

Jason Derulo singles chronology
"Love Not War (The Tampa Beat)" (2020)	"Lifestyle" (2021)	"Jalebi Baby" (2021)

Adam Levine singles chronology
"Baby Girl" (2019)	"Lifestyle" (2021)	"Good Mood" (2021)

Music video
- "Lifestyle" (dance video) on YouTube

"Lifestyle" is a song by American singer Jason Derulo featuring fellow American singer Adam Levine of Maroon 5. It was released on January 21, 2021, by Artist Partner Group and Atlantic Records.

In February 2024, the song was included on Derulo's fifth studio album Nu King.

== Background ==
Jason Derulo announced the single through his social media accounts on January 17, 2021, and it was made available for pre-order. In said social media posts, Derulo referred to this track being the start of a "new era," which made media outlets expect the upcoming release of Derulo's fifth studio album and first since 2015's Everything Is 4.

The song would later be included on the deluxe edition of Maroon 5's seventh studio album Jordi, despite the song having no involvement from the band members outside of Levine.

== Release and music video ==
"Lifestyle" was released for digital download and streaming on January 21, 2021, alongside the official music video which currently has 23 million views on YouTube as of March 2023. Adam Levine does not appear in the video for unknown reasons.

== Composition and lyrics ==
The premise of the song sees Jason Derulo and Adam Levine attempting to pursue a woman with high-class tastes. Within the track Derulo makes references to Rihanna's hit "Diamonds" and Future's 2015 song "Fuck Up Some Commas". In terms of musical notation, the song is composed in the key of B♭ minor, with a tempo of 123 beats per minute, and runs for 2:33.

== Charts ==
=== Weekly charts ===
Weekly chart performance for "Lifestyle"
Chart (2021)	Peak position
Belgium (Ultratip Bubbling Under Flanders)	36
Bulgaria (PROPHON)	8
Canada Hot 100 (Billboard)	54
Canada AC (Billboard)	48
Canada CHR/Top 40 (Billboard)	18
Canada Hot AC (Billboard)	21
Croatia (HRT)	72
Czech Republic Airplay (ČNS IFPI)	4
Germany Airplay (BVMI)	41
Global 200 (Billboard)	137
Ireland (IRMA)	91
Lithuania (AGATA)	96
Mexico Airplay (Billboard)	22
Netherlands (Dutch Top 40)	17
Netherlands (Single Top 100)	36
New Zealand Hot Singles (RMNZ)	4
Poland Airplay (ZPAV)	1
Romania (Airplay 100)	43
San Marino (SMRRTV Top 50)	33
Slovakia Airplay (ČNS IFPI)	17
Slovakia Singles Digital (ČNS IFPI)	96
Sweden (Sverigetopplistan)	74
Switzerland (Schweizer Hitparade)	66
UK Singles (Official Charts)	70
US Billboard Hot 100	71
US Adult Pop Airplay (Billboard)	16
US Pop Airplay (Billboard)	20

=== Year-end charts ===
Year-end chart performance for "Lifestyle"
Chart (2021)	Position
Netherlands (Dutch Top 40)	96
Poland (ZPAV)	16

== Certifications ==
Certifications for "Lifestyle"
Region	Certification	Certified units/sales
Canada (Music Canada)	Platinum	80,000^{‡}
Netherlands (NVPI)	Gold	40,000^{‡}
Poland (ZPAV)	Gold	25,000^{‡}
^{‡} Sales+streaming figures based on certification alone.

== Release history ==
Release history for "Lifestyle"
Region	Date	Format	Version(s)	Label	Ref.
Various	January 21, 2021	Digital download; streaming	Original	Atlantic	
Italy	January 22, 2021	Contemporary hit radio	Original	Artist Partner Group	
United States	January 25, 2021	Adult contemporary radio	Original	Atlantic	
United States	January 26, 2021	Contemporary hit radio	Original	Atlantic	
Various	February 16, 2021	Digital download; streaming	Goldhouse Remix	Atlantic	
Various	February 16, 2021	Digital download; streaming	MKJ Remix	Atlantic	
Various	February 18, 2021	Digital download; streaming	David Guetta Slap House Mix	Atlantic	
