= Killah B =

American producer, songwriter, multi-instrumentalist

Brian Vincent Bates
- Born: Chicago, Illinois, United States
- Other names: Killah B, Brian Bates, IllestProducer
- Musical career
- Genres: R&B; country; rock
- Occupations: Producer; songwriter; multi-instrumentalist

Brian Vincent Bates, also known as Killah B, is an American songwriter, producer, and multi-instrumentalist, best known for co-writing Billboard Hot 100 number one single "Texas Hold 'Em" from 2024 Beyoncé album Cowboy Carter, as well as the title track from Ariana Grande album Positions which also went #1.

== Early life ==
Adopted by his grandparents at a young age alongside his brother, Bates was placed into drumming and piano lessons when his grandfather noticed musical talent in him. From 6 until 14, he was classically-trained in piano and learned to play the drums. The family moved to New Mexico, where Bates began playing drums in a church with pastors who had also moved from Chicago, becoming their drummer when their previous drummer moved away.

== Career ==
Several years later Bates moved to Atlanta, where he began to write and produce for Elijah Blake, Tinashe, Keyshia Cole, and Usher, before being signed as a pop songwriter to APG helmed by Mike Caren after an impromptu meeting at a party. He would later write for Ariana Grande and Beyoncé, earning two Billboard Hot 100 number one singles and 3 Grammy nominations.

== Songwriting and production credits ==
Credits are courtesy of Discogs, Tidal, Apple Music, and AllMusic.

Title	Year	Artist	Album
"Translation"	2017	Sevyn Streeter	Girl Disrupted
"Birthday"	2018	Usher	A
"Hopscotch"	2019	Tinashe	Songs for You
"Touch & Go" (Featuring 6lack)	2019	Tinashe	Songs for You
"Know Better"	2019	Tinashe	Songs for You
"Positions"	2020	Ariana Grande	Positions
"Circus"	2021	Summer Walker	Still Over It
"I Don't Wanna Be in Love"	2021	Keyshia Cole	TBA
"Talm'Bout"	2022	Chris Brown	Breezy
"Letters"	2023	Monica	TBA
"Nu King"	2024	Jason Derulo	Nu King
"Texas Hold 'Em"	2024	Beyoncé	Cowboy Carter

== Awards and nominations ==
Year	Ceremony	Award	Result	Ref
2024	ASCAP Country Music Awards	Most Performed Country Songs (Texas Hold 'Em)	Won	
2025	67th Annual Grammy Awards	Grammy Award for Record of the Year (Texas Hold 'Em)	Nominated	
2025	67th Annual Grammy Awards	Grammy Award for Song of the Year (Texas Hold 'Em)	Nominated	
2025	67th Annual Grammy Awards	Grammy Award for Best Country Song (Texas Hold 'Em)	Nominated	
2025	ASCAP Pop Music Awards	Most Performed Songs (Texas Hold 'Em)	Won	
2025	ASCAP Rhythm & Soul Music Awards	Winning R&B/Hip-Hop & Rap Songs (Texas Hold 'Em)	Won	
