= Nuka (beat maker) =

New Caledonian beat maker & music producer

- Birth name: Ridge Manuka Maukava
- Born: 2000 or 2001 (age 23–24); Dumbéa, Nouméa, New Caledonia
- Occupation: Record producer
- Years active: 2017–present
- Labels: Sony Music

Ridge Manuka Maukava (born 2000 or 2001), known by his stage name Nuka, is a New Caledonian beat maker and record producer known for his song "Love Not War (The Tampa Beat)", a collaboration with American R&B singer Jason Derulo. Sony Music released the song on 20 November 2020 as a re-work of Nuka's 2018 composition "4 Brylean (WayzRmx2018)". Nuka produced the track and is an associate performer on it. The song has charted worldwide including on the UK Singles Chart and on charts in Australia, Austria, Belgium, Germany, Sweden, and Switzerland.

Nuka first produced songs in 2017 and released "4 Brylean (WayzRmx2018)" on SoundCloud the following year. At the start of 2020, the instrumental rose in popularity due to a video on social networking platform TikTok with choreography by Tampa Curhat, though Nuka was not credited. According to Nuka, Curhat attempted to claim ownership of the song in August 2020 when contacted by Sony Music, but could not provide the song. The label then got in touch with Nuka through his Facebook page the month after. At the time, Nuka was studying to be a pastry chef at the Saint Jean XXIII lycée in Païta. He then put his studies on hold to continue his music career after signing with Sony.

== Discography ==
=== Singles ===
List of singles, with selected chart positions, showing year released
Title	Year	Peak chart positions							Certifications	Album
Title	Year	AUS	AUT	BEL (FL)	GER	SWE	SWI	UK	Certifications	Album
"Love Not War (The Tampa Beat)" (with Jason Derulo)	2020	49	20	50	9	97	5	26	ARIA: Platinum; BPI: Silver; BVMI: Platinum; IFPI AUT: 2× Platinum; IFPI SWI: Platinum	Nu King
