= Jalebi Baby =

Punjabi-English song by Tesher and Jason Derulo

Single by Tesher
- Released: November 13, 2020; May 28, 2021 (Jason Derulo remix)
- Genre: Reggaeton
- Length: 3:09 (original); 2:49 (Jason Derulo remix)
- Label: Namah Music Group; Capitol
- Songwriters: Hitesh Sharma and Jason Derulo

Tesher singles chronology
"Young Shahrukh" (2020)	"Jalebi Baby" (2020)	"Desperado" (2023)

Lyric video
- "Jalebi Baby" on YouTube

Jason Derulo singles chronology
"Lifestyle" (2021)	"Jalebi Baby" (2021)	"Acapulco" (2021)

Music video
- "Jalebi Baby" on YouTube

"Jalebi Baby" is a Punjabi-English song sung and produced by Canadian rapper, singer-songwriter and producer Tesher, first released on November 13, 2020 by Namah Music Group and Capitol Records. Following the viral success of the track, a remix with American singer Jason Derulo was released on May 28, 2021. "Jalebi Baby" was written by Hitesh Sharma, with additional lyrics added for the remix by Jason Derulo.

In February 2024, the remix was included on Derulo's fifth studio album Nu King.

== Background and release ==
In 2020, after his debut with the single "Young Shahrukh", Tesher independently released "Yummy Jalebi", a remix of Justin Bieber's "Yummy" with "Jalebi Bai" from the soundtrack of Bollywood film Double Dhamaal. The song went viral on social media platforms including TikTok and Instagram for a verse featuring original vocals from Tesher. In response to popular demand, he released a version that removed "Yummy" and extended his verse to a full original song with his own rapping in Punjabi and English. The new song, entitled "Jalebi Baby", was released for digital download and streaming on November 13, 2020 as his second major label single.

"Jalebi Baby" achieved viral success on TikTok, which caught the attention of American singer Jason Derulo. Derulo approached Tesher to feature on the song, and a remix version with the duo was released for digital download and streaming on May 28, 2021. The official music video for the remix, directed by Gil Green, was released on July 13, 2021, and starred Tesher and Derulo alongside Indian-American model Ghazal Gill as the female lead.

== Composition ==
"Jalebi Baby" is composed in the key of D minor for both the original and the remix, with a tempo of 93 beats per minute. The track contains a sample of "Havana Salsa" by artist "Drum! Drum! Drum! from which you can hear piano, trumpet and bass. The song title refers to a well-known South Asian and Middle Eastern sweet known as jalebi. Tesher posted on his Instagram page that "He can tell you the 2021 song of the summer is literally about an Indian sweet. And that's got to count for something". However, the lyrics were intended by Tesher as a double entendre, with the titular jalebi taking on a more risqué meaning. In an interview with PopShift, Tesher admitted, "For me personally … when I say, 'Baby let me eat it, I just want to see it,' I’m not talking about jalebis. And I’ll leave it at that."

== Live performances ==
On July 7, 2021, Tesher and Jason Derulo performed "Jalebi Baby" together live on Today. On May 15, 2022, Tesher performed "Jalebi Baby" live with Simu Liu at the Juno Awards of 2022, which were held at Toronto's Budweiser Stage.

== Commercial performance ==
Upon release, "Jalebi Baby" became a viral sensation, topping the Shazam charts in 25+ countries and amassing over 100 million combined global streams by May. The track became Tesher's second after "Young Shahrukh" to peak at number one on the UK Asian Music Chart and remained atop the chart for seven consecutive weeks. The song also debuted at number 20 on the Top Triller Global chart on the issue dated February 20, 2021 and at number 16 on Billboard's World Digital Song Sales chart on the issue dated May 29, 2021.

"Jalebi Baby" entered at number 186 on the Billboard Global 200 chart and at number 116 on the Billboard Global Excl. U.S. chart on the issue dated June 12. The track also steadily rose on the World Digital Song Sales chart to a peak of number 3 for two weeks in July. The song debuted at number 17 in the inaugural edition of India's top 20 international singles chart on June 21 and rose to a peak of 7 for three weeks starting on July 26, becoming Tesher's first top-ten hit in the country. It was a success in Europe as well, charting in Austria, France, Germany, Netherlands, Poland, and Switzerland. "Jalebi Baby" amassed over 200 million global streams as of July 2021. Outside Europe, the song also topped the charts in India, the US, and Canada.

Following the release of the music video, "Jalebi Baby" gained traction globally. After weeks of static or downward motion on the Billboard Global 200 charts, in the week ending July 15 streams rose 26% to 12.8 million and sales rose 6% to 2,100 worldwide. The song shot from number 142 to 119 on the July 24-dated Global Excl. U.S. chart and re-entered the Global 200 at number 187, approaching its original peaks. This was the first week in which Derulo was credited on the Global charts, as the remix outperformed the original in chart activity for the first time. The following week, the track reached new peaks at number 80 on the Global 200 and number 50 on the Global Excl. U.S. chart. The song entered the Pop Airplay chart at number 39 on the week of August 14.

== Usage in media ==
"Jalebi Baby" featured in the second episode of the Disney+ original television series Ms. Marvel (2022), which stars Iman Vellani as Kamala Khan, the first Muslim superhero in the Marvel Cinematic Universe (MCU). The song plays as Kamala meets her crush Kamran shirtless for the first time. Tesher was delighted by the inclusion of his song, stating "It's no secret I'm a big Marvel fan so being Kamala Khan's mental thirsting soundtrack is an absolute dream come true for me. The best part of all this, however, is that I can officially say that I exist in the MCU."

Before a cricket match between India and Pakistan on September 14, 2025 in the 2025 Asia Cup, a few seconds of the song was accidentally played instead of the Pakistani national anthem.

== Credits and personnel ==
Credits and personnel for "Jalebi Baby" and its remix adapted from Tidal.

- Tesher, lead artist, producer, composer, lyricist, mixer, recording engineer
- Shweta Subram, background vocalist
- Jason Derulo, lead artist, composer, lyricist (remix)
- Ben Hogarth, recording engineer (remix)
- Jack Curtis, keyboardist

== Charts ==
=== Weekly charts ===
Weekly chart performance for "Jalebi Baby"
Chart (2020–2021)	Peak position
Austria (Ö3 Austria Top 40)	73
Canada Hot 100 (Billboard)	36
France (SNEP)	72
Germany (GfK)	81
Global 200 (Billboard)	80
India International Singles (IMI)	7
Netherlands (Single Top 100)	84
Poland Airplay (ZPAV)	22
Romania (Radiomonitor)	2
Switzerland (Schweizer Hitparade)	71
UK Asian Music (OCC)	1
UK Streaming (OCC)	92
US Pop Airplay (Billboard)	39
US World Digital Song Sales (Billboard)	3
Top Triller Global (Billboard)	20

=== Year-end charts ===
Year-end chart performance for "Jalebi Baby"
Chart (2021)	Position
CIS (TopHit)	62
India International Singles (IMI)	18
Russia Airplay (TopHit)	70

== Certifications ==
Certifications for "Jalebi Baby"
Region	Certification	Certified units/sales
Brazil (Pro-Música Brasil)	Platinum	40,000^{‡}
Canada (Music Canada)	2× Platinum	160,000^{‡}
France (SNEP)	Gold	100,000^{‡}
New Zealand (RMNZ)	Gold	15,000^{‡}
Poland (ZPAV)	2× Platinum	100,000^{‡}
United Kingdom (BPI)	Silver	200,000^{‡}
United States (RIAA)	Gold	500,000^{‡}
^{‡} Sales+streaming figures based on certification alone.

== Release history ==
Release dates and formats for "Jalebi Baby"
Region	Date	Format	Version	Label	Ref.
Various	November 13, 2020	Digital download; streaming	Original version	Capitol	
Various	May 28, 2021	Digital download; streaming	Jason Derulo version	Capitol	
Various	August 20, 2021	Digital download; streaming	Jason Derulo version (DallasK remix)	Capitol	
