= Alana Springsteen =

American singer and songwriter

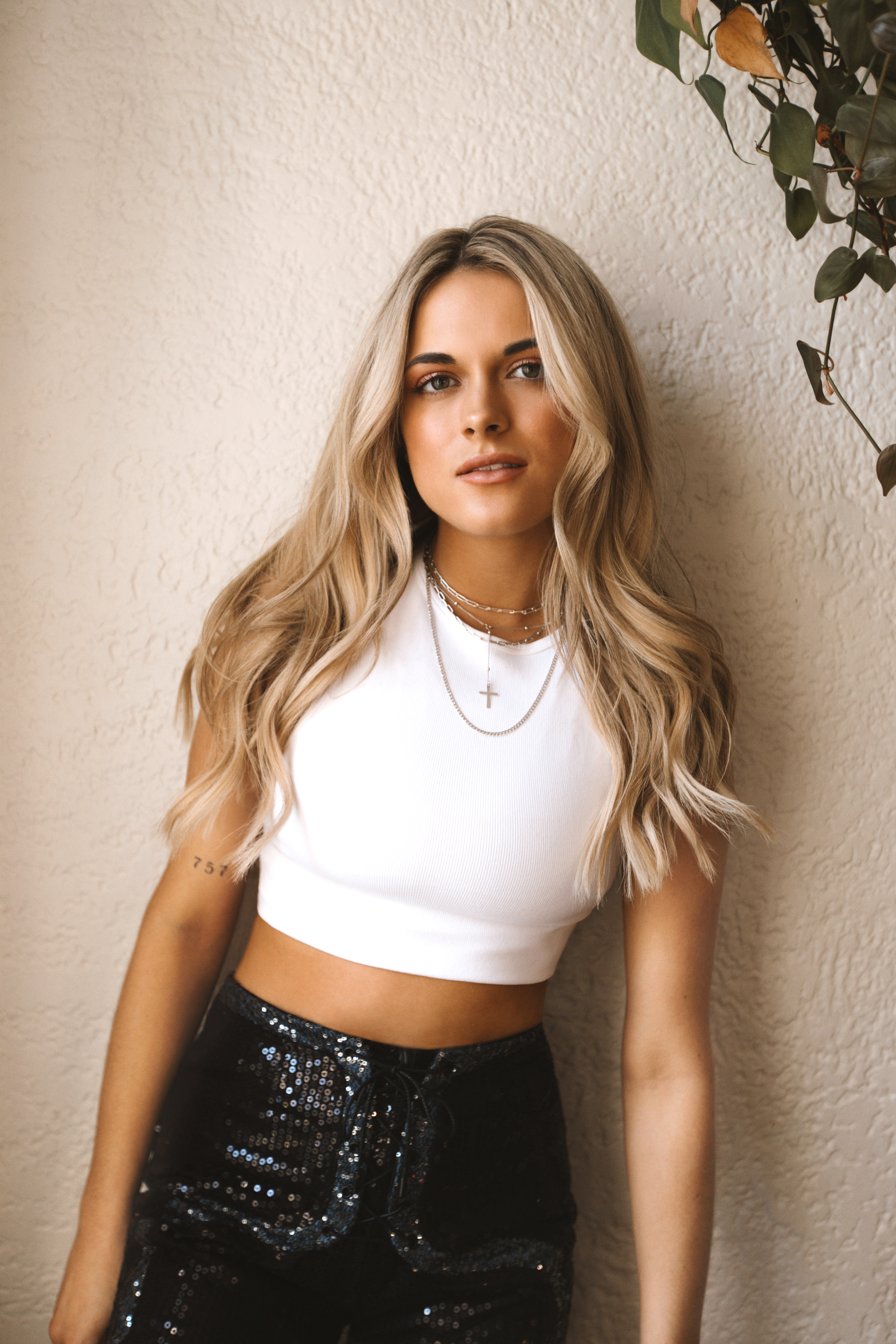
- Springsteen in 2022
- Born: 2000 or 2001 (age 25–26); Virginia Beach, Virginia
- Occupation: Singer-songwriter
- Musical career
- Origin: Virginia Beach, Virginia
- Genre: Country music
- Instruments: Vocals; piano; guitar
- Labels: Columbia Records, Sony Music
- Website: www.alanaspringsteen.com

Alana Springsteen is an American country music singer and songwriter. She gained fame in 2023 after releasing her first full-length album, Twenty Something.

== Early life ==
Springsteen grew up in Virginia Beach, Virginia, with her parents and three younger brothers, where she started making music at an early age. She started playing guitar at age 7 and wrote her first song, called "Fairy Tale", at age 9. When Springsteen was 10 years old, her family moved to Nashville, Tennessee, to support her music career, and there she secured a publishing deal at age 14. Some of her early performances were at minor league baseball games. Springsteen has said that both her grandfathers were pastors. Despite having the same surname, Springsteen is not related to musician Bruce Springsteen.

== Career ==
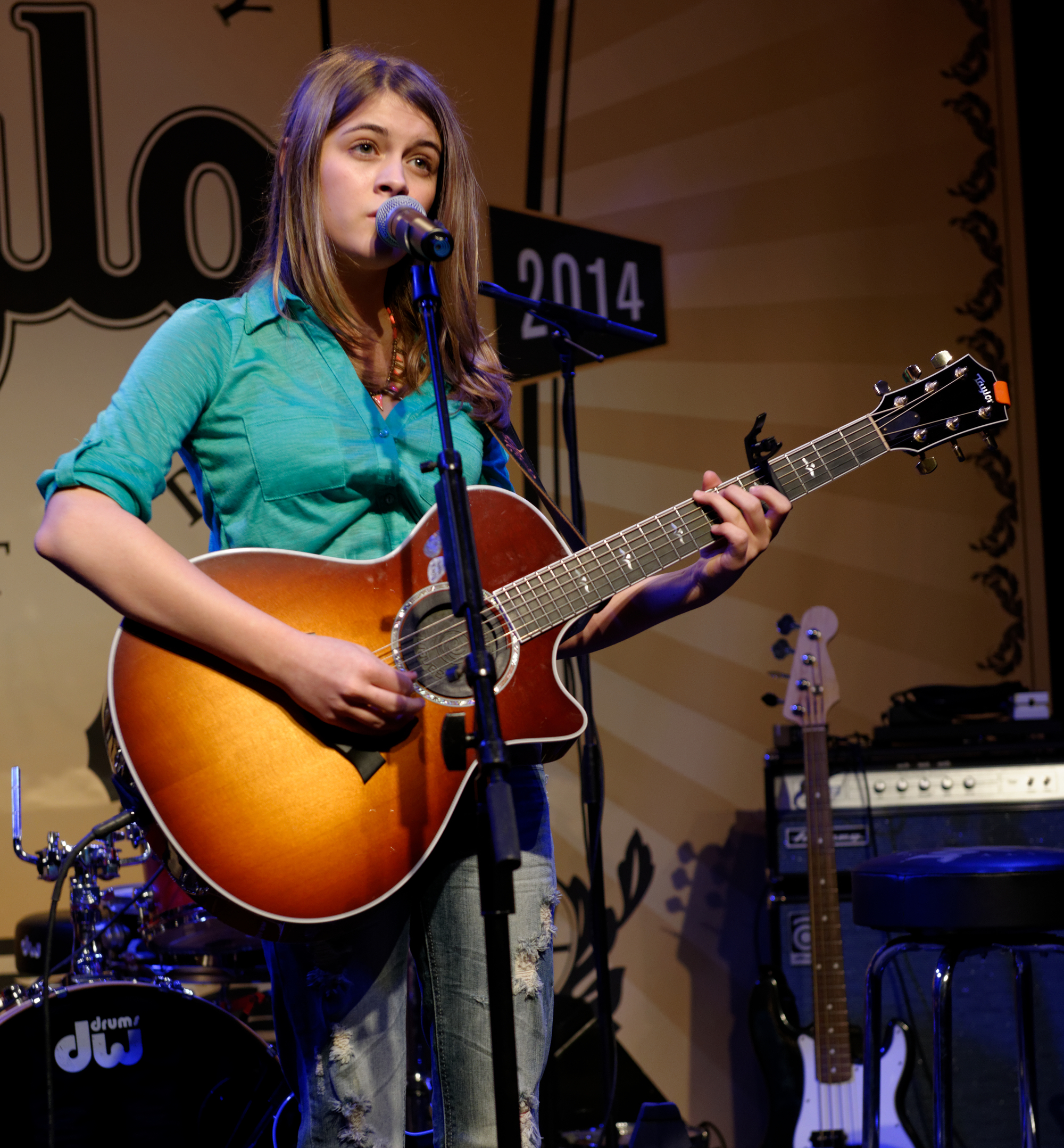
Springsteen performing at NAMM show in 2014

In 2019, Springsteen released her debut EP Slow Down with a single of the same name. In 2023, Springsteen released a series of three EPs, called messing it up, figuring it out, and getting it right. Those three EPs were later combined to form her first full-length album, Twenty Something, released in August 2023. The album included collaborations with two high-profile country musicians. Chris Stapleton was featured on "Ghost In My Guitar" and Mitchell Tenpenny was featured on "Goodbye Looks Good On You". The latter record was Springsteen's first to be certified RIAA Gold. Springsteen co-wrote all the songs on the album, along with other Nashville-based songwriters, including Liz Rose. Robin Hilton of NPR called the title track of Twenty Something "a deeply moving coming-of-age song that left a lot of us at the office in tears." Other NPR critics wrote that the album "focused on illuminating, owning and pushing through the tangled mesh of emotions of that time with piercing detail — the self-doubt, the friendships that come and go, the ways we navigate a mountain of new responsibilities, and so much more."

In July 2024, Springsteen released a collaboration with Dutch DJ Tiësto called "Hot Honey", which went to the number-one position on the Billboard Dance/Mix Show Airplay chart. Springsteen toured in 2024 as an opening act for Luke Bryan's Mind of a Country Boy tour. While touring in October 2024, Springsteen's tour bus caught fire, destroying musical gear and personal items. This forced Springsteen to cancel tour dates in Texas before returning to performing. That month, Springsteen released singles "Cowboy" and "Hold My Beer", and in December 2024, she released an EP produced from her August 5, 2024 appearance on NPR's Tiny Desk Concert series.

In 2025, Springsteen toured as a supporting act for country musician Keith Urban.

In addition to singing, Springsteen plays piano and guitar on her records. She has said that Taylor Swift has been her musical role model.

Springsteen sang the national anthem a capella at the Major League Baseball "Field of Dreams" game in Dyersville, Iowa on August 13, 2026.

== Reception ==
People named Springsteen on their "2024 Ones to Watch" list of musicians. In discussing Springsteen, music critics at NPR wrote that "few artists dissect and make sense of life in your 20s quite like Alana Springsteen" and that she "pulls off a deep understanding of human nature with surprising detail — and without falling back on any of the typical tropes you might expect in country music."

== Tours ==
=== Supporting ===
- High and Alive World Tour (2025) with Keith Urban

=== Headlining ===
- I Hope This Helps Tour (2026)

== Discography ==
=== Studio albums ===
List of studio albums, with selected details
Title	Album details
Twenty Something	Release date: August 18, 2023; Label: Columbia; Formats: CD, digital download, LP
I Hope This Helps	Release date: May 29, 2026; Label: Santa Anna; Formats: CD, digital download, LP

=== Extended plays ===
List of EPs, with selected details
Title	EP details
History of Breaking Up (Part One)	Release date: September 17, 2021; Label: Warehouse West Entertainment Records; Format: Digital download
History of Breaking Up (Part Two)	Release date: July 15, 2022; Label: Warehouse West Entertainment Records; Format: Digital download

=== Singles ===
==== As lead artist ====
List of singles
Title	Year	Certifications	Album
"Trying Not To"	2021		History of Breaking Up (Part One)
"California"	2021		History of Breaking Up (Part One)
"Zero Trucks"	2021		History of Breaking Up (Part One)
"Me Myself and Why"	2022		History of Breaking Up (Part Two)
"New Number"	2022		History of Breaking Up (Part Two)
"Trust Issues"	2022		History of Breaking Up (Part Two)
"You Don't Deserve a Country Song"	2023		Twenty Something
"Goodbye Looks Good on You" (featuring Mitchell Tenpenny)	2023	RIAA: Gold	Twenty Something
"Ghost in My Guitar"	2023		Twenty Something
"My Own Advice" (with William Black and Illenium)	2023		The Nature of Hope
"Hot Honey" (with Tiësto)	2024		Non-album single

==== As featured artist ====
List of featured singles
Title	Year	Album
"For What It's Worth" (Breland featuring Alana Springsteen)	2023	Cross Country: The Extra Mile
