= All Me (Kehlani song) =

2019 single by Kehlani featuring Keyshia Cole

Single by Kehlani featuring Keyshia Cole
- Released: December 23, 2019
- Genre: R&B; pop
- Length: 2:54
- Label: TSNMI; Atlantic
- Songwriters: Kehlani Parrish; Keyshia Cole
- Producers: P-Lo; Reece Beats

Kehlani singles chronology
"Morning" (2019)	"All Me" (2019)	"Konclusions" (2020)

Keyshia Cole singles chronology
"Incapable" (2017)	"All Me" (2019)	"I Don't Wanna Be in Love" (2021)

"All Me" is a song by American singer Kehlani featuring American singer Keyshia Cole, released on December 23, 2019 through Atlantic Records.

As of May 2024, the upload of "All Me" on Kehlani's official YouTube account has 14 million views. On Spotify, "All Me" is Kehlani's 21st most-streamed song, currently sitting at 90.7 million streams.

== Charts ==
Chart performance for "All Me"
Chart (2020)	Peak position
New Zealand Hot Singles (RMNZ)	7
US Bubbling Under Hot 100 (Billboard)	7
US Bubbling Under R&B/Hip-Hop Singles (Billboard)	2

== Certifications ==
Region	Certification	Certified units/sales
New Zealand (RMNZ)	Gold	15,000^{‡}
United States (RIAA)	Gold	500,000^{‡}
^{‡} Sales+streaming figures based on certification alone.
