= Take You Dancing =

2020 single by Jason Derulo

Single by Jason Derulo
- Released: July 21, 2020
- Genre: Pop
- Length: 3:10
- Label: Atlantic
- Songwriters: Teemu Brunila; Jason Desrouleaux; Emanuel "Eman" Kiriakou; Sarah Solovay; Shawn Charles
- Producers: Teemu Brunila; Emanuel "Eman" Kiriakou

Jason Derulo singles chronology
"Don't Cry for Me" (2020)	"Take You Dancing" (2020)	"Savage Love (Laxed – Siren Beat) (BTS Remix)" (2020)

Music video
- "Take You Dancing" on YouTube

"Take You Dancing" is a song by American singer Jason Derulo. It was released as a single on July 21, 2020, by Atlantic Records, a sister of his previous home label Warner Records. The song was written by Teemu Brunila, Derulo, Emanuel "Eman" Kiriakou, Sarah Solovay and Shawn Charles. Some reviewers remarked that the song is reminiscent of Charlie Puth’s “Attention” (2017).

On January 28, 2021, it was added as DLC for the video game Fuser.

At the APRA Music Awards of 2022, the song was nominated for Most Performed International Work.

In February 2024, the song was included on Derulo's fifth studio album Nu King.

== Background ==
Talking about the song, Derulo said, "In these times, we all need a song that's going to uplift us. Hopefully Take You Dancing can be a light in these trying days."

== Personnel ==
Credits adapted from Tidal.

- Emanuel "Eman" Kiriakou – producer, bass, editor, engineer, guitar, keyboards, programmer, writer
- Teemu Brunila – producer, bass, editor, engineer, guitar, keyboards, programmer, recorded by, writer
- Chris Gehringer – masterer
- Serban Ghenea – mixer
- Ben Hogarth – recorded by
- Jason Derulo – vocals, writer
- Sarah Solovay – writer, vocals
- Shawn Charles – writer

== Charts ==
=== Weekly charts ===
Chart (2020–2021)	Peak position
Australia (ARIA)	10
Austria (Ö3 Austria Top 40)	12
Belgium (Ultratop 50 Flanders)	8
Belgium (Ultratop 50 Wallonia)	6
Canada Hot 100 (Billboard)	49
Canada AC (Billboard)	35
Canada CHR/Top 40 (Billboard)	12
Canada Hot AC (Billboard)	21
CIS Airplay (TopHit)	1
Colombia Anglo (Monitor Latino)	14
Croatia (HRT)	4
Czech Republic Airplay (ČNS IFPI)	4
Czech Republic Singles Digital (ČNS IFPI)	32
Denmark (Tracklisten)	27
Estonia (Eesti Tipp-40)	24
Finland (Suomen virallinen lista)	15
France (SNEP)	74
Germany (GfK)	15
Global 200 (Billboard)	32
Greece (IFPI)	16
Hungary (Dance Top 40)	6
Hungary (Rádiós Top 40)	1
Hungary (Single Top 40)	3
Hungary (Stream Top 40)	7
Iceland (Tónlistinn)	2
Ireland (IRMA)	7
Israel (Media Forest)	5
Italy (FIMI)	24
Lithuania (AGATA)	11
Mexico Airplay (Billboard)	3
Netherlands (Dutch Top 40)	10
Netherlands (Single Top 100)	16
New Zealand (Recorded Music NZ)	13
Norway (VG-lista)	10
Poland Airplay (ZPAV)	2
Portugal (AFP)	32
Portugal Airplay (AFP)	2
Romania (Airplay 100)	1
Russia Airplay (TopHit)	3
San Marino (SMRRTV Top 50)	12
Scottish Singles Sales (Official Charts)	9
Slovakia Airplay (ČNS IFPI)	3
Slovakia Singles Digital (ČNS IFPI)	12
Slovenia (SloTop50)	2
Sweden (Sverigetopplistan)	26
Switzerland (Schweizer Hitparade)	11
UK Singles (Official Charts)	7
Ukraine Airplay (TopHit)	3
US Billboard Hot 100	57
US Adult Pop Airplay (Billboard)	25
US Dance Airplay (Billboard)	29
US Pop Airplay (Billboard)	13

2025 weekly chart performance for "Take You Dancing"
Chart (2025)	Peak position
Venezuela Airplay (Record Report)	114

=== Year-end charts ===
Chart (2020)	Position
Australia (ARIA)	89
Austria (Ö3 Austria Top 40)	50
Belgium (Ultratop Flanders)	85
CIS (TopHit)	30
Germany (Official German Charts)	65
Hungary (Dance Top 40)	63
Hungary (Single Top 40)	36
Hungary (Stream Top 40)	35
Iceland (Tónlistinn)	37
Netherlands (Dutch Top 40)	46
Netherlands (Single Top 100)	79
Poland (ZPAV)	34
Romania (Airplay 100)	49
Russia Airplay (TopHit)	55
Switzerland (Schweizer Hitparade)	55
UK Singles (OCC)	92
Ukraine Airplay (TopHit)	68

Chart (2021)	Position
Australia (ARIA)	96
Belgium (Ultratop Flanders)	95
Belgium (Ultratop Wallonia)	92
CIS (TopHit)	14
Global 200 (Billboard)	172
Hungary (Dance Top 40)	17
Hungary (Rádiós Top 40)	1
Hungary (Single Top 40)	47
Hungary (Stream Top 40)	51
Poland (ZPAV)	95
Portugal (AFP)	148
Russia Airplay (TopHit)	44
Ukraine Airplay (TopHit)	9

2022 year-end chart performance for "Take You Dancing"
Chart (2022)	Position
Hungary (Rádiós Top 40)	21
Ukraine Airplay (TopHit)	42

2023 year-end chart performance for "Take You Dancing"
Chart (2023)	Position
Hungary (Rádiós Top 40)	72
Ukraine Airplay (TopHit)	128

== Certifications ==
Region	Certification	Certified units/sales
Australia (ARIA)	4× Platinum	280,000^{‡}
Austria (IFPI Austria)	2× Platinum	60,000^{‡}
Belgium (BRMA)	Gold	20,000^{‡}
Brazil (Pro-Música Brasil)	2× Platinum	80,000^{‡}
Canada (Music Canada)	4× Platinum	320,000^{‡}
Denmark (IFPI Danmark)	Platinum	90,000^{‡}
France (SNEP)	Platinum	200,000^{‡}
Germany (BVMI)	Platinum	400,000^{‡}
Italy (FIMI)	Platinum	70,000^{‡}
New Zealand (RMNZ)	3× Platinum	90,000^{‡}
Poland (ZPAV)	3× Platinum	150,000^{‡}
Portugal (AFP)	Platinum	10,000^{‡}
Spain (Promusicae)	Platinum	60,000^{‡}
United Kingdom (BPI)	Platinum	600,000^{‡}
United States (RIAA)	Platinum	1,000,000^{‡}
^{‡} Sales+streaming figures based on certification alone.

== Release history ==
Region	Date	Format	Label	Ref.
Various	July 22, 2020	Digital download; streaming	Atlantic Records	
United States	October 20, 2020	Contemporary hit radio	Atlantic Records	
United States	November 30, 2020	Adult contemporary radio	Atlantic Records	

== See also ==
- List of Airplay 100 number ones of the 2020s
