= Sarah Solovay =

American singer (born 1994)

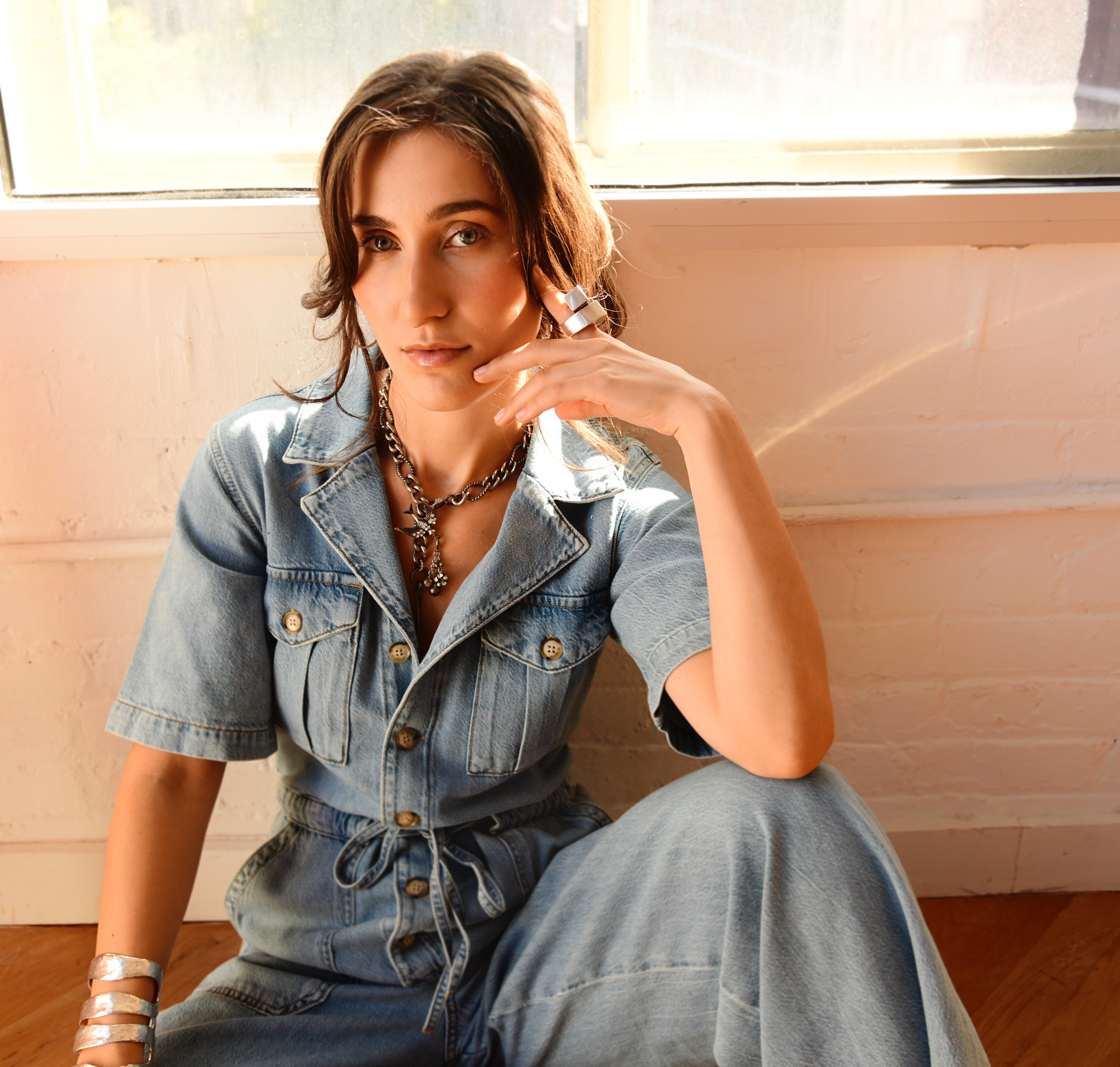
- Solovay in 2025

Background information
- Born: March 30, 1994 (age 32)
- Origin: New York City, NY
- Genres: Pop, pop rock
- Occupation: Singer-songwriter
- Instruments: Vocals, Guitar
- Years active: 2006 – present
- Labels: Pulse Music Group, Wide Eyed Entertainment

Sarah Solovay (born March 30, 1994) professionally known as Solly, is an American singer and songwriter from New York City, currently residing in Los Angeles. In 2018, Solovay signed a worldwide publishing agreement with Wide Eyed Entertainment and Pulse Music Group. She has collaborated with Shawn Mendes, Bebe Rexha, Jason Derulo, Teddy Swims, David Guetta, Marshmello, Chris Stapleton, Dolly Parton, Nessa Barrett, Gayle and Alana Springsteen. Solovay was a vocalist on singles released by Galantis and Taska Black, and provided additional vocals for the Jason Derulo 2020 single, "Take You Dancing," which was RIAA-Certified Platinum and for which she won a 2022 BMI Pop Award. Solovay's song "One in a Million" by David Guetta and Bebe Rexha was nominated for a 2024 Grammy in the Best Pop Dance Recording Category.

== Early years ==
Solovay began writing songs on guitar at age nine and released her debut EP, Gone, in 2009, at age fifteen. Its title track, "Gone," won the New York Songwriters Circle "Young Songwriters Award." In July, 2010, Solovay opened for John Mayer and Train on Mayer's "Battle Studies World Tour" in Scranton, Pennsylvania. She released her sophomore EP, Superhuman, in 2012, along with a few singles. During the summer of 2011, Solovay was profiled by The New York Times for being a musician while balancing school work.

In 2016, Solovay graduated from Yale University, where she was an American Studies major with a focus on Visual, Audio, Literary and Performance Culture. She moved back to New York City and released "Rough Draft," in 2017.[3] It was put in rotation on Sirius XM The Pulse's show, "Train Tracks," and added to several Apple Music playlists, including "Future Hits" and "Breaking Pop."

== Songwriting discography ==
2026
2026	Missin Out	Dori Valentine	Single
2026	Feels Good	Alana Springsteen	Single
2026	Crawl	Sydney Ross Mitchell	Single
2026	Natural Disaster	Lauren Spencer Smith	Single
2026	JOKE	Adam Klobi	Single
2026	FAMOUS	EMELINE	Single
2026	Your Friends Like Me Better	EMELINE	Single
2026	Club Song	The Pussycat Dolls	Single
2026	Damn Good Actress	Tiffany Stringer	Single
2026	Don't Come Lookin	Jaxson Free	Single
2026	Ego	Ari Abdul	Single
2025
2025	Sad About You	Leah Kate	Single
2025	joyride	Maggie Lindemann	Single
2025	No Vacancy	Tiger La Flor	Single
2025	Baby Blue	Winona Oak	Single
2025	Emotional Virgin	EMELINE	Single
2025	The Winner	Sydney Ross Mitchell	Single
2025	GROSS	HITGS	Single
2025	PORN STAR	EMELINE	Single
2025	bad times	Jessica Baio	Single
2025	Dead Sexy Body	Leah Kate	Single
2025	If God is Real, Then Heaven is a Club	Snow Wife	Single
2025	it doesn't kill me anymore	Lyn Lapid	Single
2025	Kissin' My Friends	Marshmello & Inji	Single
2025	Queen of Homecoming	Sydney Ross Mitchell	Single
2025	At Least I'm Hot	Reneé Rapp	Single
2025	Tough Love	Elizabeth Nichols	Single
2025	i don't wanna get sad i just wanna get rich	Emeline	Single
2025	World's Greatest Lover	Sydney Ross Mitchell	Single
2025	Are You Even Real	Teddy Swims feat Giveon	Single
2024
2024	Deer Hunter	&Team	Single
2024	Merry Bitchmas	Leah Kate	Single
2024	Russian Roulette	Nessa Barrett	Single
2024	blame it on the snow	Lyn Lapid	Single
2024	Cherish (My Love)	Illit	Single
2024	Hold My Beer	Alana Springsteen	Single
2024	I Wish I Was	The Stickmen Project	Single
2024	Bad Dreams	Teddy Swims	Single
2024	Sabana	Anitta	Single
2024	Choose Your Fighter	JoJo Siwa	Single
2024	Overthink	Key	Single
2024	Older	Eden Golan	Single
2024	I Wish I Was	The Stickmen Project	Single
2024	Sexy 4Ever	Inji feat Nile Rogers	Single
2024	Oh, To Be Cool	Ber	Single
2024	Grown Man Cry	Emeline	Single
2024	Choose Me	Caity Baser	Single
2023
2023	orbit	Henry Moodie	Single
2023	Put Your Hands on Me	Jason Derulo feat. Meghan Trainor	Single
2023	Club Heaven	Nessa Barrett	Single
2023	Do You Mind	Joel Corry feat. James Abrahart	Single
2023	ORAL HEX (spell on you)	Bludnymph	Single
2023	Other Boys	Marshmello, Dove Cameron	Single
2023	amen	Alana Springsteen feat. Chris Stapleton	Single
2023	Ick	Lay Bankz	Single
2023	hell is a teenage girl	Nessa Barrett	Single
2023	the one that should've got away	Nessa Barrett	Single
2023	plane to paris	Nessa Barrett	Single
2023	ghost in my guitar	Alana Springsteen feat. Chris Stapleton	Single
2023	Good Times Go	Nicky Youre	Single
2023	Everything I'm Not	Emeline	Single
2023	Seasons	Bebe Rexha, Dolly Parton	Single
2023	Miracle Man	Bebe Rexha	Single
2023	I'm Not High, I'm In Love	Bebe Rexha	Single
2023	american jesus	Nessa Barrett	Single
2023	Heart Wants What It Wants	Bebe Rexha	Single
2023	Bang Bang!	Nessa Barrett	Single
2022
2022	Almost Too Early For Christmas	Jimmy Fallon, Dolly Parton	Single
2022	Tired of California	Nessa Barrett	Single
2022	I'm a Mess	Johan Lenox	Single
2022	Baby Blue	Winona Oak	Single
2022	Fuck This Town	Johan Lenox	Single
2022	Show Me Love	Gali Givon	Single
2022	Superglue	Mia Rodriguez	Single
2022	God Has a Sense of Humor	Gayle (singer)	Single
2022	Better	Gali Givon	Single
2022	Scared	Gali Givon	Single
2022	This Kind of Love	The Future X	Single
2021
2021	Summer of Love	Shawn Mendes	Single
2021	Baddest	Cher Lloyd, Imanbek	Single
2021	I Do feat. LeAnn Rimes	Aloe Blacc	Single
2021	No Rest	Vicetone	Single
2021	Love On You	Olivia Holt	Single
2021	Can I Be Real	Brynn Elliott	Single
2021	Off Of My Mind	Icona Pop & Vize	Single
2020
2020	Take You Dancing	Jason Derulo	Single
2020	Feels In My Body	Icona Pop	Single
2020	I Do	Aloe Blacc	Single
2020	Years In The Making	Arkells	Single
2020	Comedown	Taska Black	Single
2020	EGO	Gia Woods	Single
2020	I Love My Friends	Steve Aoki, Icona Pop	Single
2020	Right Time	Hayden James feat. Icona Pop	Single
2020	Yours	Jesse McCartney	Single
2020	Sayonara	Max Frost	Single
2020	Water feat. Zohara	Kream	Single
2019
2019	Mood For You	Felix Sandman	Single
2019	Smart Love	Drax Project	Single
2019	We Can Get High	Galantis featuring Yellow Claw	Single
2019	Feel It	Gia Woods	Single
2019	Same	Josie Dunn	Single

== Awards and nominations ==
List of awards and nominations earned by Sarah Solovay
Award	Year (Note: Indicates the year of ceremony. Each year is linked to the article about the awards held that year, wherever possible.)	Recipient(s) and nominee(s)	Category	Result	Ref.
People's Choice Country Awards	2023	Seasons Bebe Rexha song feat. Dolly Parton	Crossover Song of 2023	Nominated	
Grammy Awards	2024	"One in a Million" David Guetta and Bebe Rexha	Best Dance Recording	Nominated	

== Discography ==
Year	Song	Album	Notes
2008	Gone	Gone EP	Self-release; SS Records
2009	Flaws and All	Single	Self-release; SS Records; Featured in Joe Dante's 2009 "The Hole 3D"
2009	Hearts Collide	90210 Soundtrack	CBS Records
2010	Gone	2010 Songwriters Hall of Fame Compilation	
2010	Raindrops	Single	Self-release; SS Records
2012	Superhuman	Superhuman EP	Self-release; SS Records
2017	Rough Draft	Single	Self-release; Solovay Records
2017	Trick Me	Single	Self-release; Solovay Records
