= Tesher =

Canadian musician (born 1995)

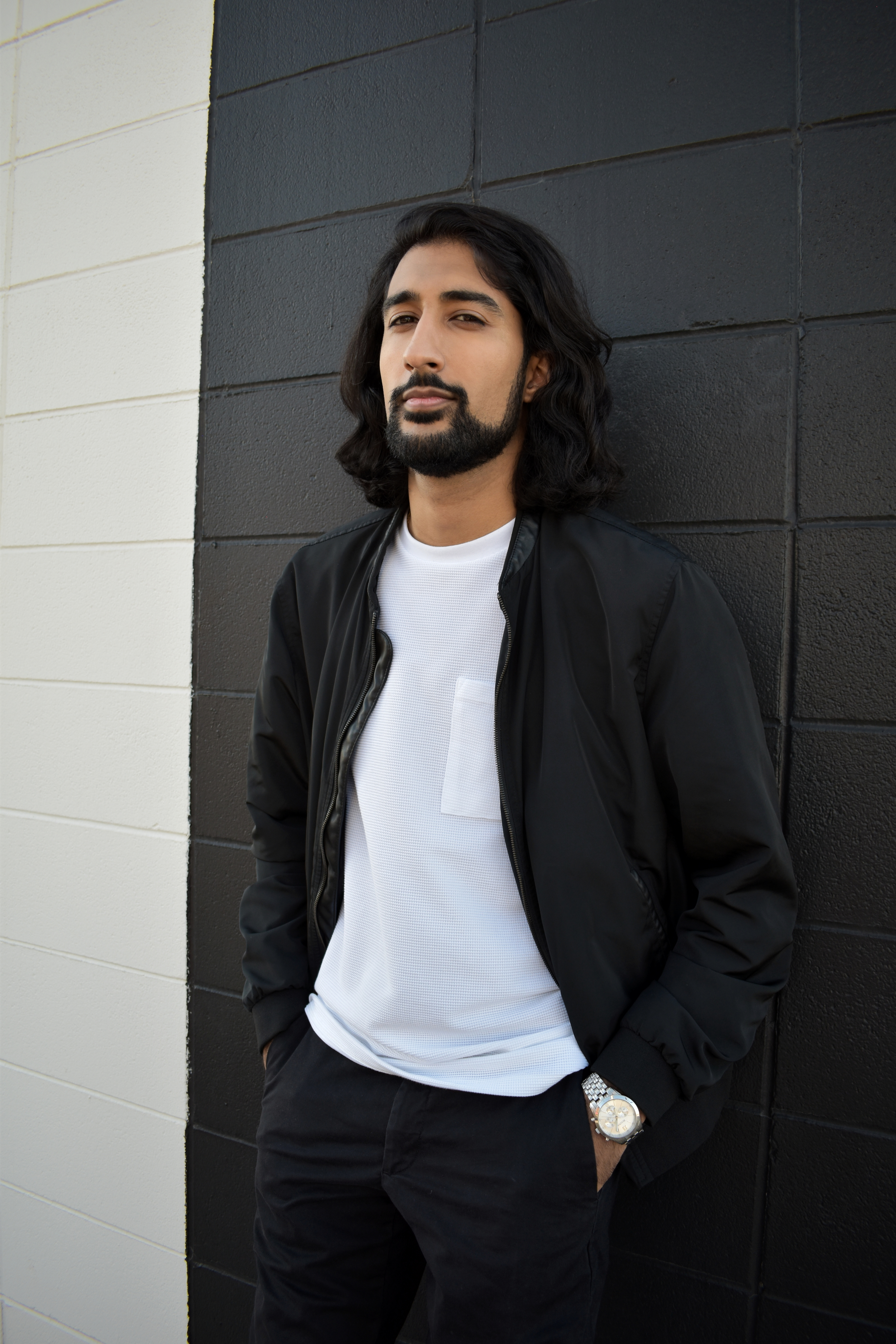
- Tesher in 2020

Background information
- Born: Hitesh Sharma; Regina, Saskatchewan, Canada
- Genres: Hip-hop; Rap
- Occupations: Rapper; singer; songwriter; record producer
- Years active: 2009–present
- Label: Capitol
- Website: www.teshermusic.com

Hitesh Sharma, known professionally as Tesher, is a Canadian rapper, singer-songwriter and producer of Indian origin. He is best known for his singles "Young Shahrukh" and "Jalebi Baby", both released in 2020. A remix version of "Jalebi Baby" was released in 2021 with Jason Derulo.

== Life and career ==
=== Upbringing ===
Born and raised in Regina, Saskatchewan, Tesher is a Hindu of Punjabi descent. He was influenced by his Indian heritage as well as his Canadian upbringing. Growing up listening to Indian as well as Western hip hop music, Tesher began to fuse Bollywood and hip-hop songs together and create mashups from a young age. Later, he also began to incorporate bhangra, R&B, pop, reggaeton, house, and salsa music into his songs.

=== Early mashups and remixes ===
Tesher began uploading his remixes to YouTube and SoundCloud when he was in high school. Around the years 2012 to 2014, he was known in particular for making country remixes.

In 2016, Tesher produced the official Bhangra mix of "Kar Gayi Chull" from the soundtrack of Bollywood film Kapoor and Sons for Sony Music India. The remix, featuring a snippet of vocals from Tesher's sister, was performed by actress Alia Bhatt at Femina Miss India 2017.

Some early mashups he created were Pharrell's "Hunter" and Que's "OG Bobby Johnson"(2014). Drake's "Back to Back" with Florence and the Machine's "Delilah" (2015), Drake's "KMT" with XXXTentacion's "Look At Me" (2017), and Ariana Grande's "7 Rings" with songs including "My Favorite Things" from The Sound of Music, Notorious B.I.G.'s "Gimme the Loot" and Soulja Boy's "Pretty Boy Swag" (2010).

In 2020, his 2019 remix "Old Town Road vs Ramta Jogi" combining Sukhwinder Singh's "Ramta Jogi" and Lil Nas X's "Old Town Road" went viral on TikTok as a sound accompanying a milk drinking challenge.

=== 2020–present: Debut original singles ===
In February 2020, Tesher released "Young Shahrukh", an original rap song he wrote, produced, and performed, with a beat that sampled "Bole Chudiyan" from the soundtrack of the Bollywood film Kabhi Khushi Kabhie Gham. According to Tesher, the song's title references Shahrukh Khan, who acted in Kabhi Khushi Kabhie Gham and is commonly dubbed the "King of Bollywood". After the song went viral on social media platforms such as YouTube, Instagram and TikTok, it was picked up by Sony Music India in May 2020, becoming Tesher's debut major label single. "Young Shahrukh" peaked at number one on the BBC Asian Music Chart on the week of July 10, 2020, and at number four on Billboard's Top Triller Global chart on the week of July 25, 2020. Indian celebrities such as Ranveer Singh and Sunny Singh praised the song for its fusion of Hindi film music with hip-hop. The official release has received over 20 million views on YouTube and 20 million streams on Spotify.

In 2020, Tesher released "Yummy Jalebi", a remix of Justin Bieber's "Yummy", with new vocals and production from Tesher. The song went viral on social media platforms including TikTok and Instagram. In response to popular demand, he released a version that removed "Yummy" and extended his verse to a full original song with his own English and Punjabi vocals. The new song, entitled "Jalebi Baby", was released as his second single on November 13, 2020. The single amassed over 100 million streams and peaked at number one on the UK Asian Music Chart for seven consecutive weeks. It also topped the Shazam charts in over 25 countries.

In 2015, Tesher signed a worldwide deal with Capitol Records in partnership with Universal Music India, which saw his music released through a unique partnership between Capitol in the U.S. and Universal Music India, who will focus on building his popularity across South Asia and its diaspora. On May 28, Tesher released a remix of "Jalebi Baby" with American singer Jason Derulo. Following the release of the remix, the track reached number 3 on Billboard's World Digital Song Sales chart, and reached the US Top 40 pop radio chart. Tesher and Derulo performed the song live on Today on NBC on July 7, 2021, and released the music video on July 13, 2021. On May 15, 2022, Tesher performed "Jalebi Baby" live with Simu Liu at the Juno Awards of 2022, at which he also received a nomination for Breakthrough Artist of the Year.

== Discography ==
=== Singles ===
==== As lead artist ====
List of singles as lead artist, with year released, selected chart positions, and album
Title	Year	Peak chart positions										Certifications	Album
Title	Year	CAN	FRA	GER	IND	POL	SWI	UK Asian	US Pop	US World	WW	Certifications	Album
"Young Shahrukh"	2020	—	—	—	—	—	—	1	—	—	—		Non-album single
"Jalebi Baby" (solo or with Jason Derulo)	2020	36	72	81	7	22	71	1	39	3	80	MC: 2× Platinum; SNEP: Gold; ZPAV: 2× Platinum; BPI: Silver	Nu King
"Jacquemus"	2023	—	—	—	—	—	—	—	—	—	—		Non-album singles
"Ready"	2024	—	—	—	—	—	—	—	—	—	—		Non-album singles
"—" denotes a recording that did not chart or was not released in that territory.

==== As featured artist ====
List of singles as featured artist, with year released, selected chart positions, and album
Title	Year	Peak chart positions		Album
Title	Year	UK Asian	UK Punjabi	Album
"Desperado" (Raghav featuring Tesher)	2023	10	6	Non-album single

== Videography ==
=== Music videos ===
List of music videos, with directors, showing year released
Title	Year	Director(s)	Length	Ref.
As lead artist
"Jalebi Baby" (with Jason Derulo)	2021	Gil Green	3:33	
"Jacquemus"	2023	Divya Jethwani	2:53	
"Ready"	2024	Kate Zamudio & Divya Jethwani	2:57	
"Ve Mundeya"" (feat. Jonita)	2025	Divya Jethwani	3:18	
As featured artist
"Desperado" (Raghav featuring Tesher)	2023	Oliver Banyard	4:23	

== Awards and nominations ==
Award	Year	Category	Result	Ref.
Juno Awards	2022	Breakthrough Artist of the Year	Nominated	
