= Mikaben =

Haitian singer, songwriter, producer (1981–2022)

- Birth name: Michael Benjamin
- Also known as: Mika, Mikaben
- Born: June 27, 1981; Port-au-Prince, Haiti
- Died: October 15, 2022 (aged 41); 12th arrondissement of Paris, France
- Genres: Compas; zouk; dancehall
- Occupations: Singer; songwriter; producer
- Instruments: Vocals; guitar; piano
- Years active: 1999–2022

Michael Benjamin (June 27, 1981 – October 15, 2022), better known as Mikaben, was a Haitian singer, songwriter and record producer.

== Life and career ==
Michael Benjamin was born in Port-au-Prince, Haiti on 27 June 1981. He was the son of Haitian singer Lionel Benjamin. He began his career in 1999 in a Christmas contest televised special that was hosted every December called "Konkou Chante Nwel" where he won fifth place. Michael Benjamin was known as a producer, a singer, and a songwriter and dabbled in many Afro-Caribbean genres such as konpa, twoubadou, rap kreyol, soca, and reggae.

== Death ==
On the night of 15–16 October 2022, Benjamin died during a concert at the Accor Arena in Paris. He was 41 years old. He suffered a cardiac arrest on stage during his performance. Benjamin succumbed shortly after, despite rescue efforts.
