= Flo discography =

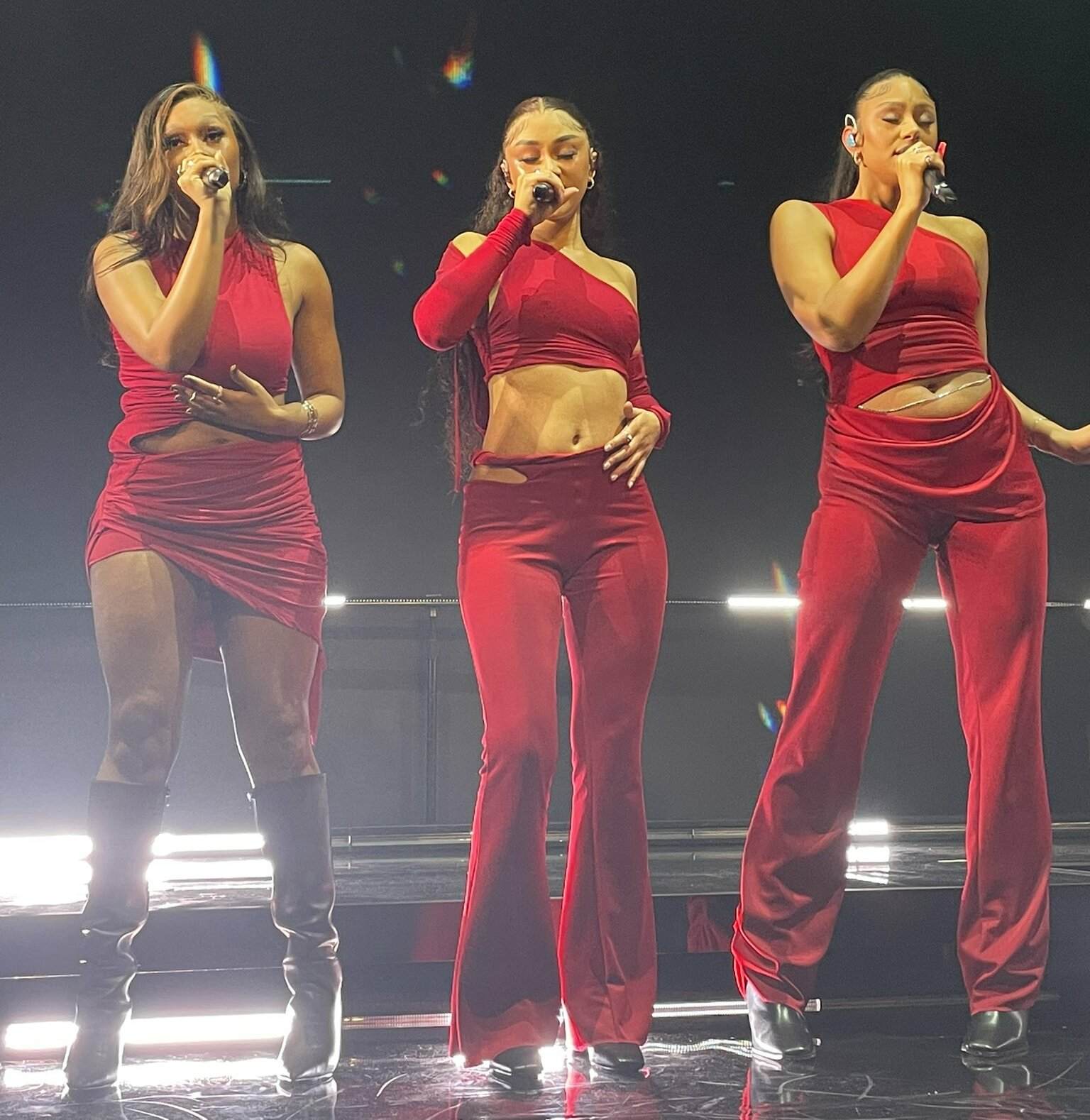
- Flo performing at Flo Live in 2023
- Studio albums: 2
- EPs: 3
- Singles: 15
- Promotional singles: 4
- Music videos: 14

British girl group Flo has released two studio albums, three extended plays, fifteen singles, four promotional singles, fourteen music videos and have made various guest appearances. Formed in 2019, the group released their debut song "Cardboard Box" in 2022 with Island Records. It secured a position at number 78 on the Official Singles Chart in the United Kingdom, earning a silver certification by the British Phonographic Industry (BPI). This eventually led to the release of their first extended play, The Lead; it was met with positive reception, despite failing to chart.

After the surprise-release of 3 of Us in 2023, Flo presented their debut studio album, titled Access All Areas (2024), which peaked at number three on the Official Albums Chart, being the highest chart position for a British girl group under the rhythm and blues (R&B) genre since the debut of Mis-Teeq in 2001. Flo also became the first British girl group to top the R&B Albums Chart in the 2020s.

== Studio albums ==
List of studio albums, with selected chart positions
Title	Details	Peak chart positions						
Title	Details	UK	AUS	BEL (FL)	FRA	NZ	SCO	US
Access All Areas	Released: 15 November 2024; Label: Island; Format: CD, streaming, digital download, vinyl	3	—	127	182	—	10	163
Therapy at the Club	Released: 7 August 2026; Label: EMI; Format: CD, streaming, digital download, vinyl	5	49	82	115	38	4	168

== Extended plays ==
List of extended plays, with selected details
Title	Details
Apple Music Home Session: Flo	Released: 29 June 2022; Label: Island; Format: Streaming, digital download
The Lead	Released: 8 July 2022; Label: Island; Format: Streaming, digital download, LP
3 of Us	Released: 3 July 2023; Label: Island; Format: Streaming, digital download

== Singles ==
=== As lead artist ===
List of singles as lead artist, showing year released, peak chart positions, and album name
Title	Year	Peak chart positions										Certifications	Album
Title	Year	UK	GER Air.	EST Air.	ISR TV Air.	JPN Over.	LTU Air.	NZ Hot	NGR Air.	SUR	US Rhy.	Certifications	Album
"Cardboard Box"	2022	76	—	—	—	17	—	19	—	—	—	BPI: Silver	The Lead
"Immature"	2022	—	—	—	—	—	—	—	—	—	—		The Lead
"Losing You"	2022	—	—	—	—	—	—	—	—	—	—		Non-album singles
"Fly Girl" (featuring Missy Elliott)	2023	38	—	—	—	7	—	20	—	—	—		Non-album singles
"Walk Like This"	2024	—	—	—	—	—	—	32	—	—	—		Access All Areas
"Caught Up"	2024	—	—	—	—	—	—	—	—	—	—		Access All Areas
"Check"	2024	— (Note: "Check" did not enter the UK Singles Chart, but peaked at number 12 on the UK Official Physical Singles Chart, and at number 78 on the UK Official Singles Sales Chart.)	—	—	—	—	—	—	—	—	—		Access All Areas
"In My Bag" (featuring GloRilla)	2024	—	—	—	—	—	—	31	—	—	—		Access All Areas
"On & On"	2025	—	—	—	—	—	—	—	—	—	—		Access All Areas
"Get It Till I'm Gone" (with Chy Cartier)	2025	—	—	—	—	—	—	—	—	—	—		Access All Areas
"The Mood" (with Kaytranada)	2025	—	—	—	—	—	—	—	—	—	—		Non-album single
"Recently Deleted"	2025	—	—	—	—	—	—	—	—	—	—		Access All Areas
"Leak It"	2026	45	8	119	2	—	34	12	—	—	26		Therapy at the Club
"Don't Break Her Heart"	2026	—	—	96	—	—	—	—	88	13	19		Therapy at the Club
"Remedied"	2026	—	—	—	—	—	—	36	—	—	—		Therapy at the Club
"Cry Ugly"	2026	—	—	—	—	—	—	24	—	—	—		Therapy at the Club
"Leave You (Never)"	2026	—	—	—	—	—	—	26	—	—	—		Non-album single
"—" denotes a recording that did not chart or was not released in that territory.

=== As featured artist ===
List of singles as featured artist, showing year released, peak chart positions, and album name
Title	Year	Peak chart positions	Album
Title	Year	NGR	Album
"Pretty Eyes" (Sunkis featuring Flo)	2026	70	Non-album single

=== Promotional singles ===
List of promotional single(s), showing year released and album name
Title	Year	Album
"Not My Job"	2022	The Lead
"Bending My Rules"	2024	Access All Areas
"AAA"	2024	Access All Areas
"Therapy at the Club"	2026	Therapy at the Club

== Guest appearances ==
List of guest appearances, with year released, other artist(s), and album name
Title	Year	Other artist(s)	Album
"Hide & Seek" (Remix)	2023	Stormzy	Non-album single
"8" (Remix)	2024	Kehlani	While We Wait 2
"Talk You Through It"	2025	Kwn	with all due respect
"Act XVI: Twentyfoe7"	2025	4Batz	Still Shinin
"Crash Out"	2025	Josh Levi	Hydraulic
"Mamacitas"	2026	—N/a	Goat

== Music videos ==
List of music videos, showing year released and directors
Title	Year	Other artist(s)	Director(s)	Ref.
As lead artist
"Cardboard Box"	2022	—	Loose	
"Immature"	2022	—	Avesta Keshtmand	
"Summertime"	2022	—	Saorla Houston	
"Losing You"	2022	—	Meeks and Frost	
"Fly Girl"	2023	Missy Elliott	Tajana Tokyo	
"Walk Like This"	2024	—	Sahra Zadat	
"Caught Up"	2024	—	Ganna Bogdan	
"Check"	2024	—	Troy Roscoe	
"AAA"	2024	—	Curtis Kantsa	
"In My Bag"	2024	GloRilla	Troy Roscoe	
"Recently Deleted"	2025	—	Marlon Gang and Sienna Nava	
"Leak It"	2026	—	Olivia De Camps	
"Don't Break Her Heart"	2026	—	Troy Roscoe	
"Remedied"	2026	—	Jake Nava, Sienna Nava and Marlon Cang	

== See also ==
- List of songs recorded by Flo
