= List of songs recorded by Flo =

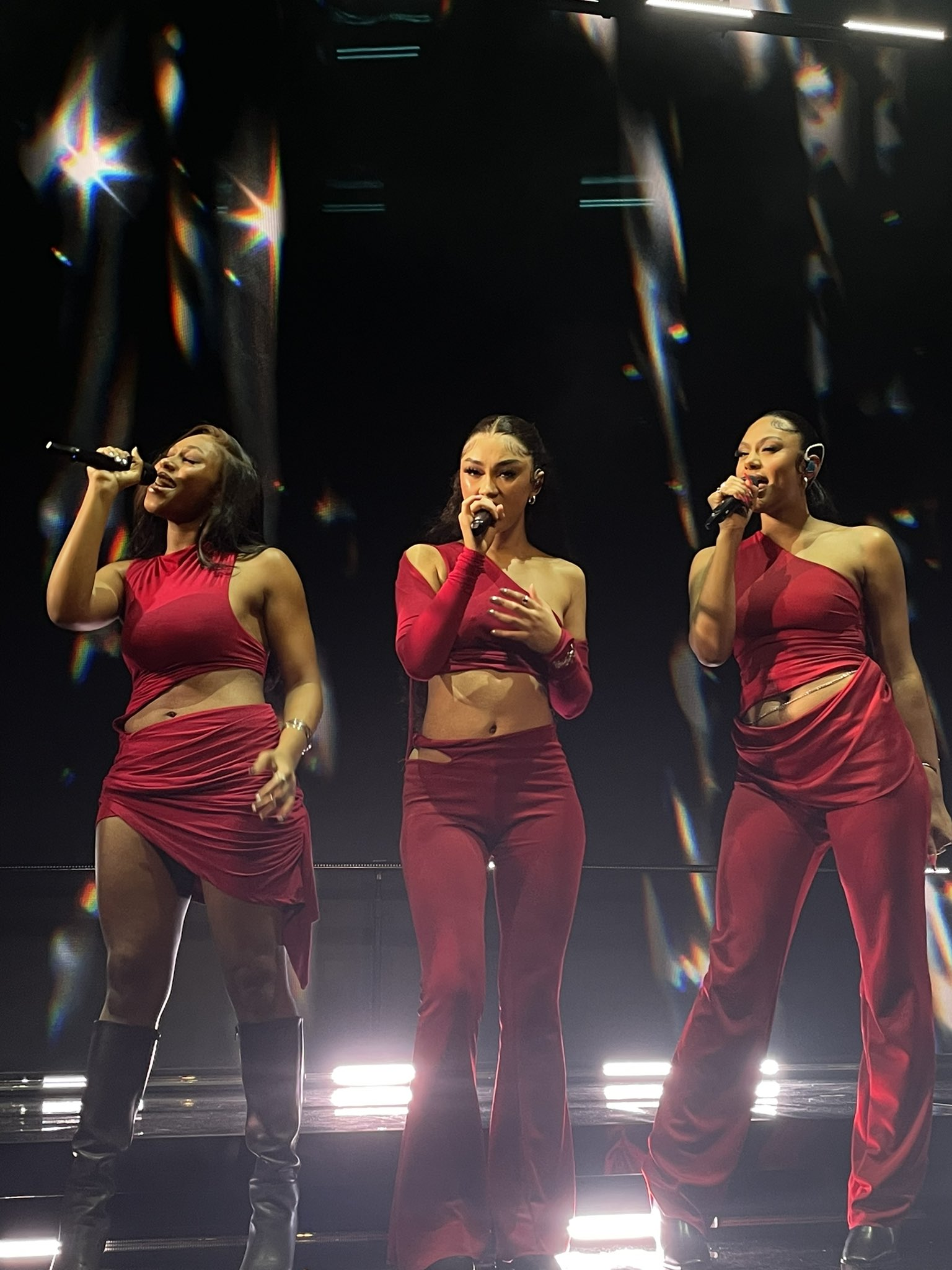
Flo performing at the Flo Live tour in 2023

British girl group Flo, composed of Jorja Douglas, Renée Downer and Stella Quaresma, were formed in 2019 by Island Records. They released their debut single, "Cardboard Box", in 2022. It preceded their debut extended play (EP), The Lead (2022), which was swiftly followed by the surprise release of their second EP, 3 of Us (2023). Their debut studio album, Access All Areas, was released in 2024 and featured the single "In My Bag" featuring American rapper GloRilla. The album saw Flo receive a nomination for Best Progressive R&B Album at the 68th Annual Grammy Awards.

Flo's second album, Therapy at the Club, was released in 2026. It was preceded by three singles: "Leak It", "Don't Break Her Heart" and "Remedied". It debuted at number five on the UK Albums Chart, making Flo the first British R&B girl group to debut their first two studio albums in the top five in the UK.

== Songs ==
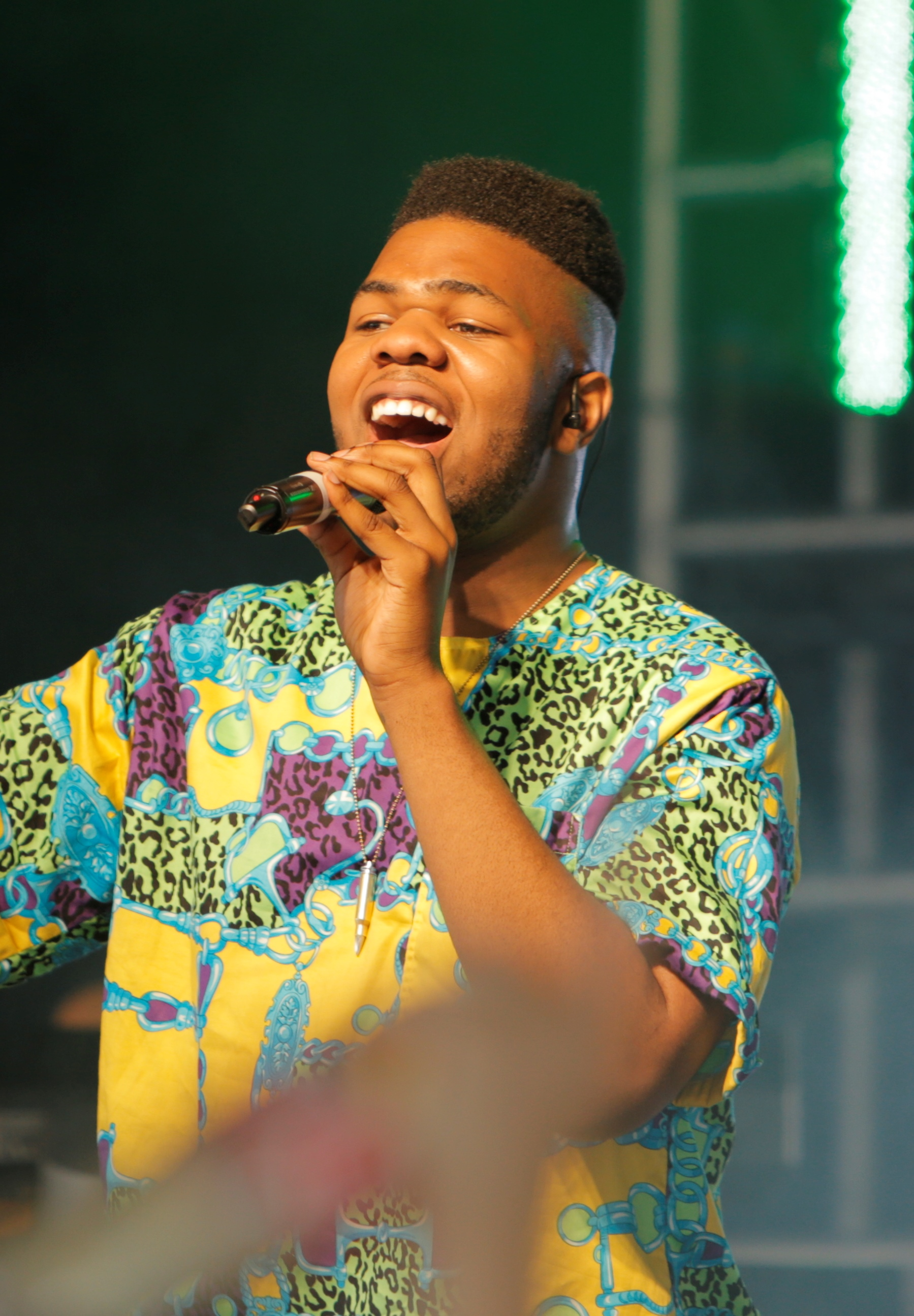
MNEK regularly writes songs with Flo.

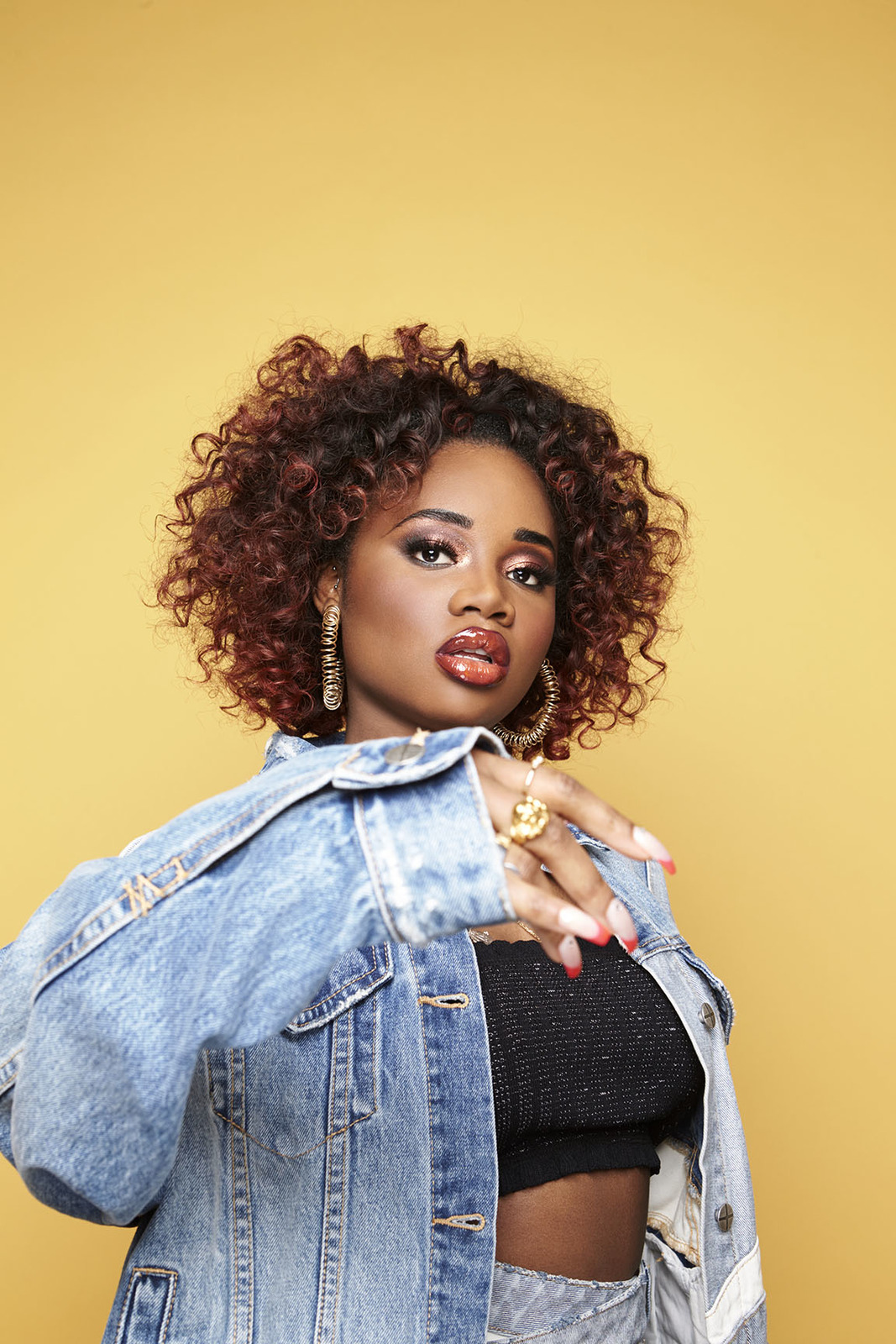
Kabba regularly co-writes with Flo.

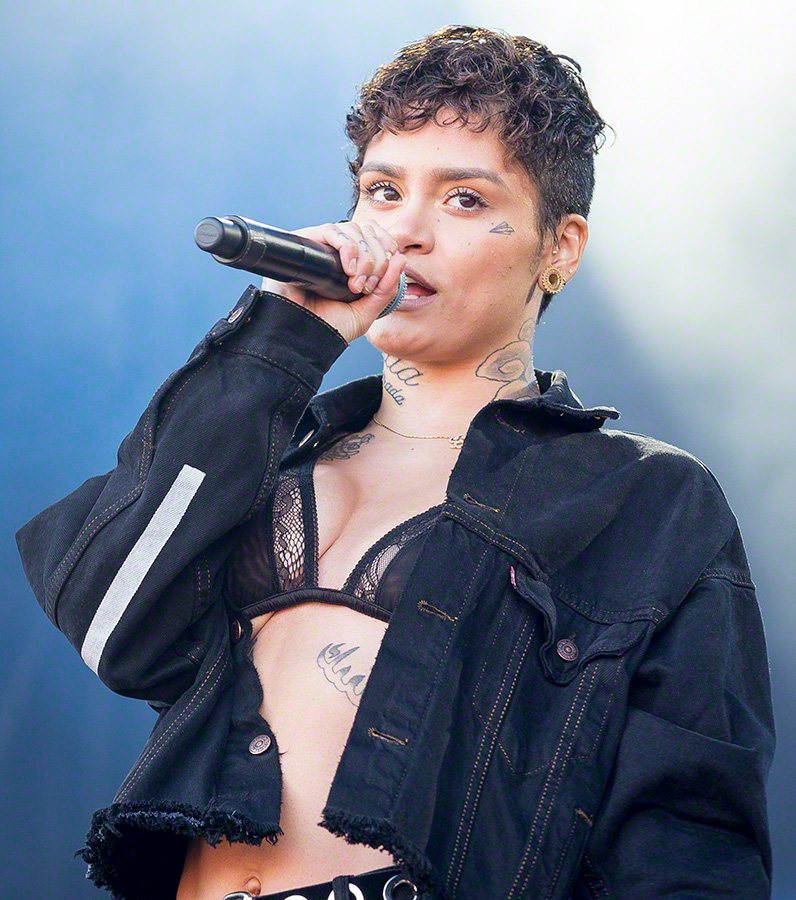
Flo have collaborated with Kehlani twice.

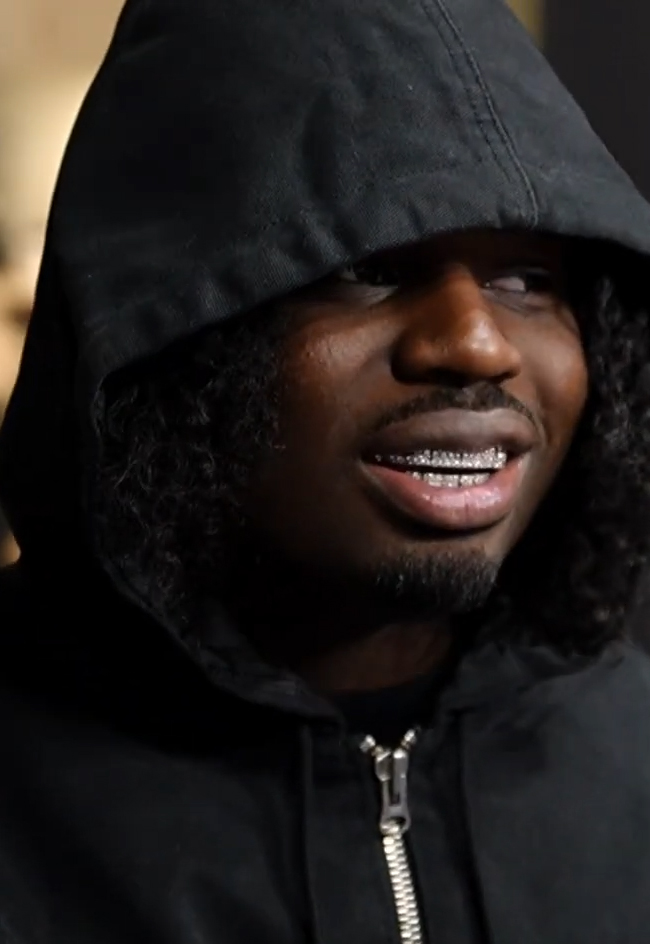
Flo featured on 4Batz's debut studio album, Still Shinin (2025).

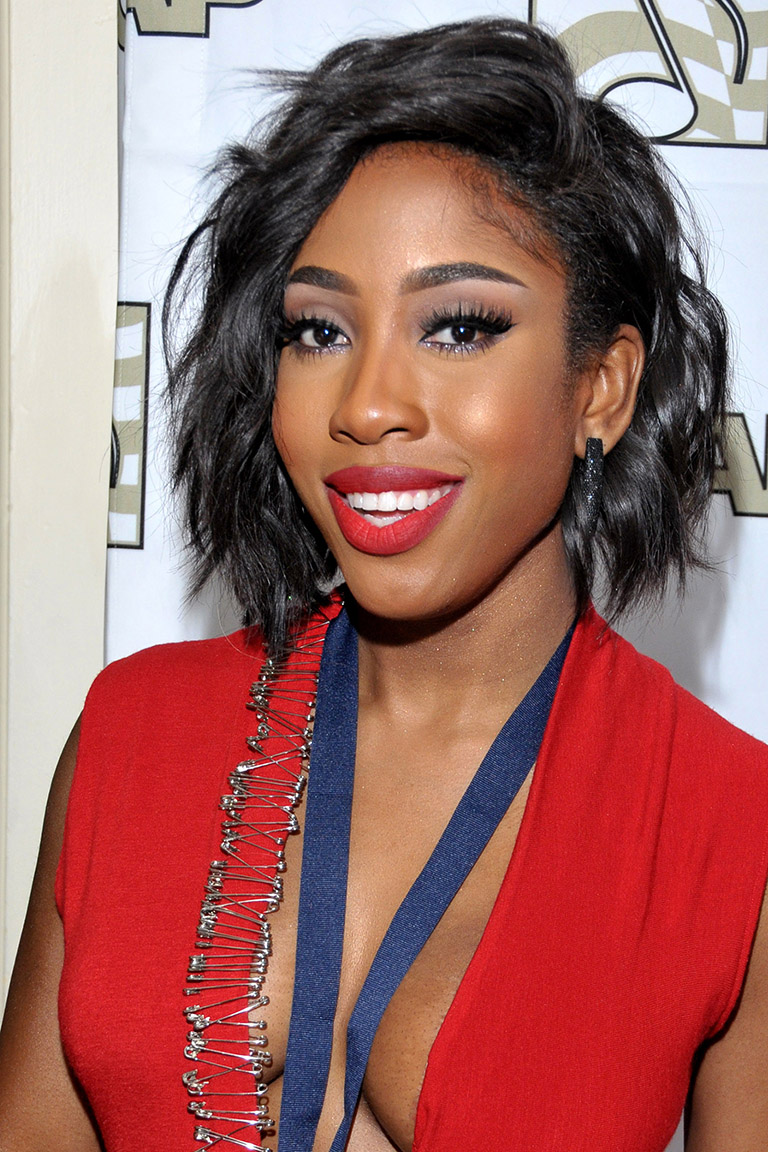
Sevyn Streeter has co-written with Flo numerous times.

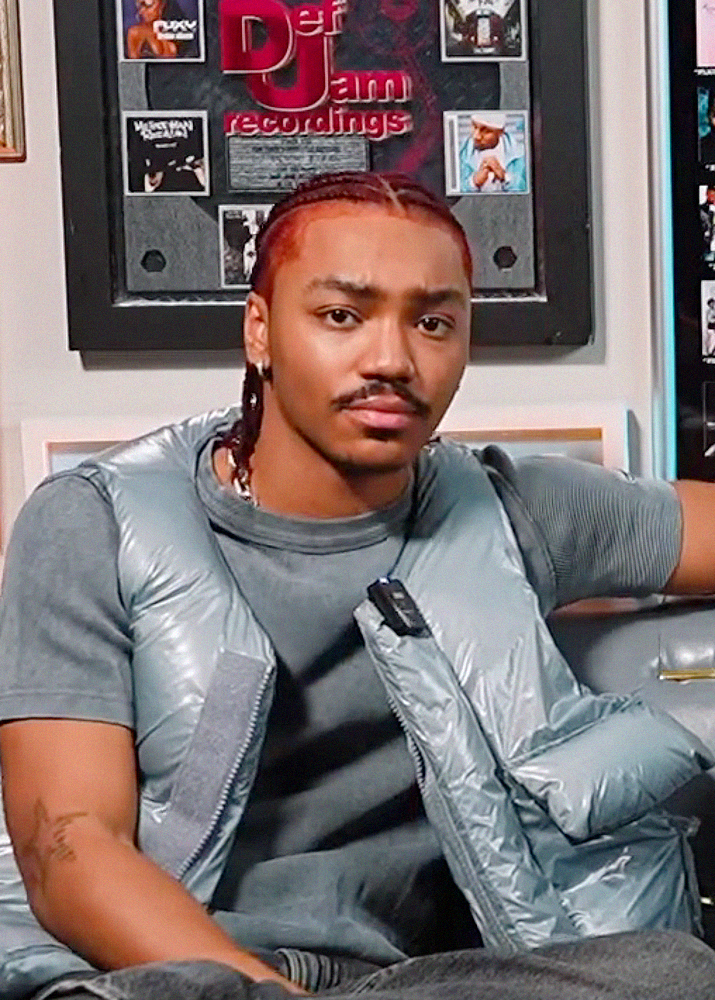
Flo featured on Josh Levi's 2025 single "Crash Out".

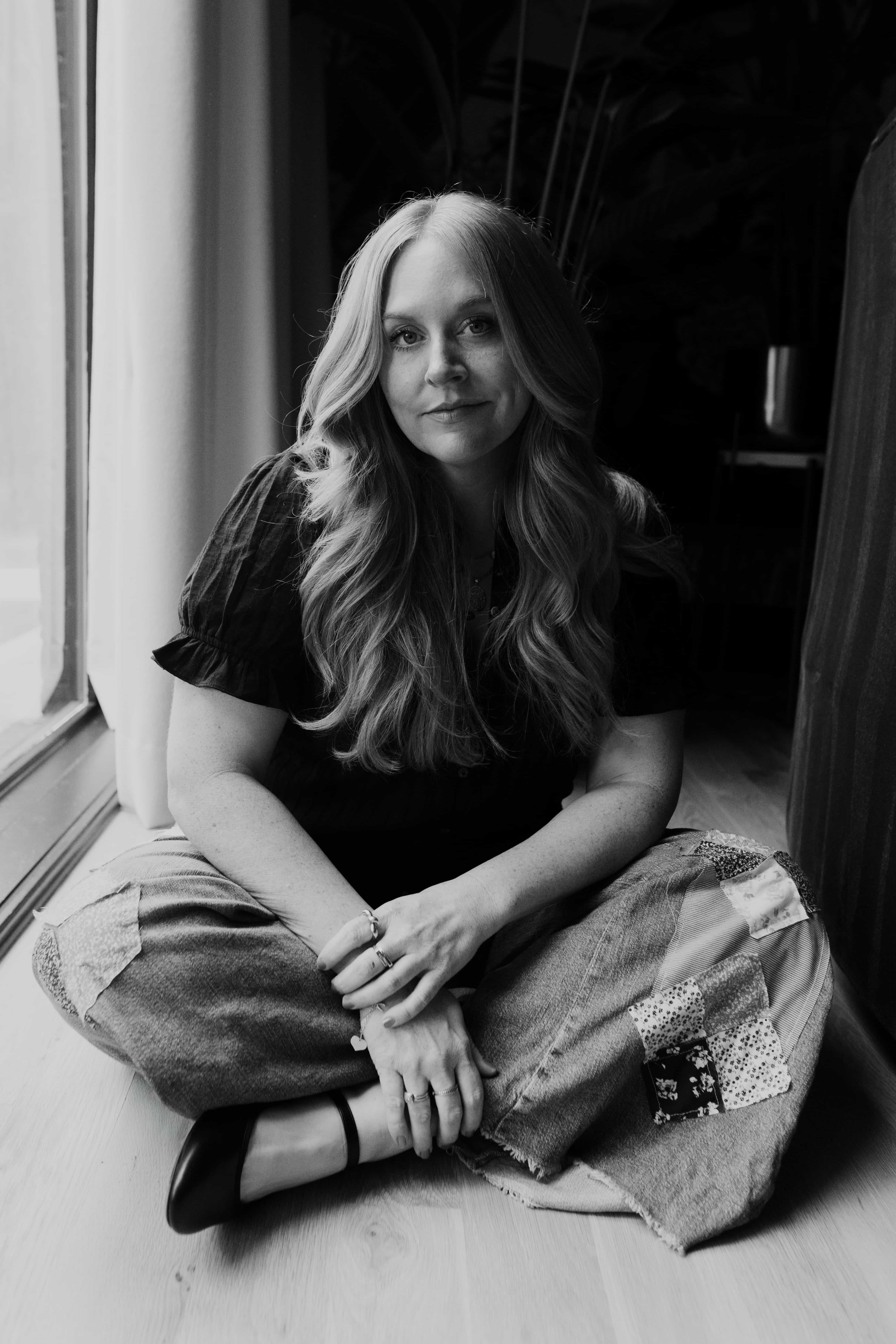
Steph Jones worked with Flo for Therapy at the Club (2026).

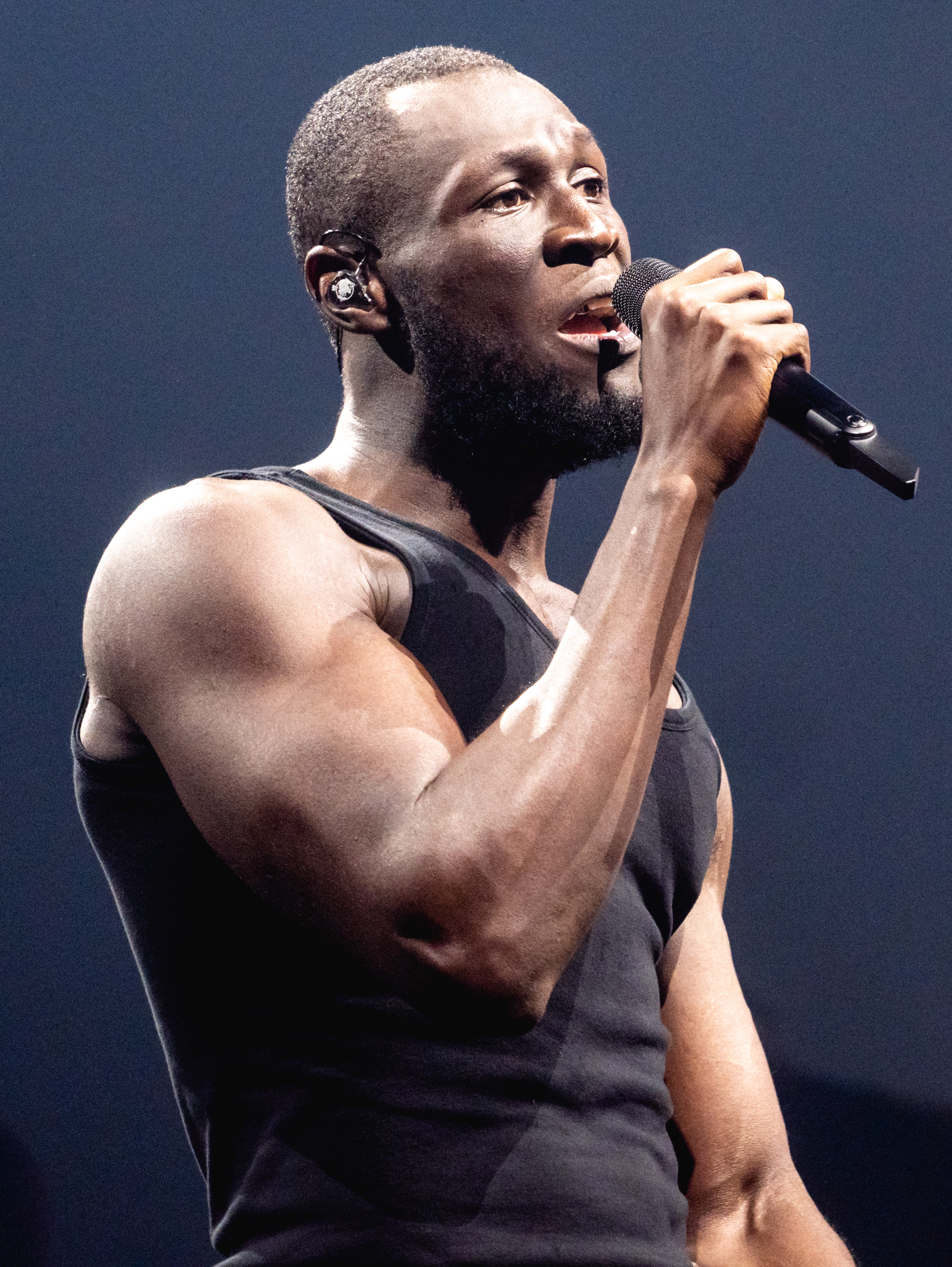
Flo featured on a remix of "Hide & Seek" with Stormzy in 2023.

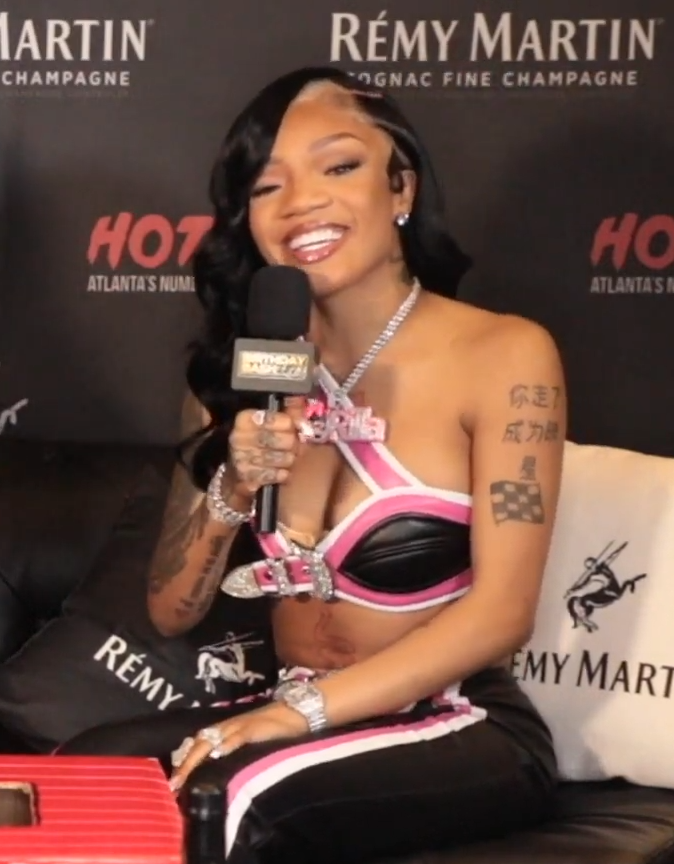
GloRilla featured on Flo's 2023 single "In My Bag".

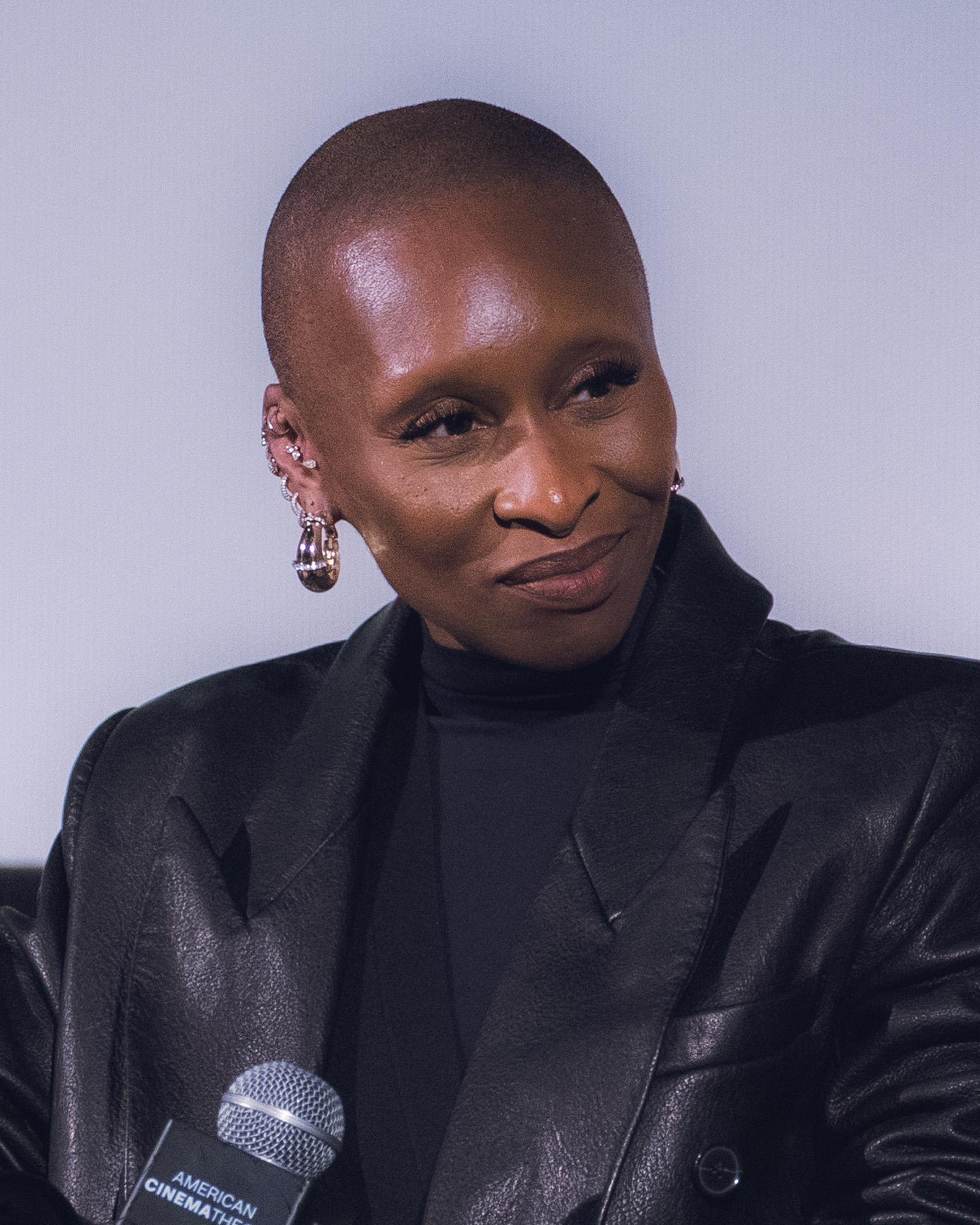
Cynthia Erivo featured on the introductory track of Access All Areas (2025).

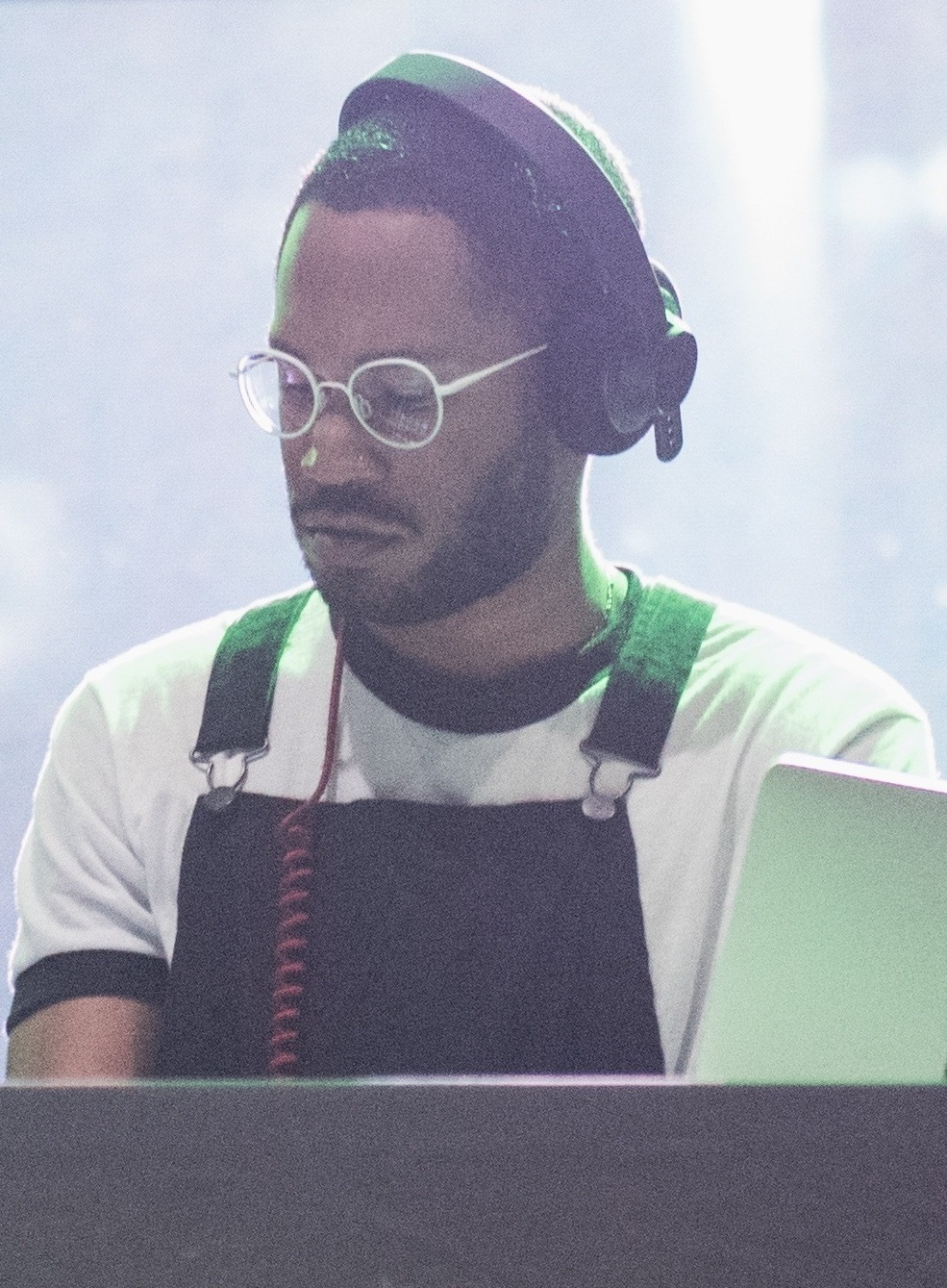
Flo and Kaytranada collaborated on their 2025 single "The Mood".

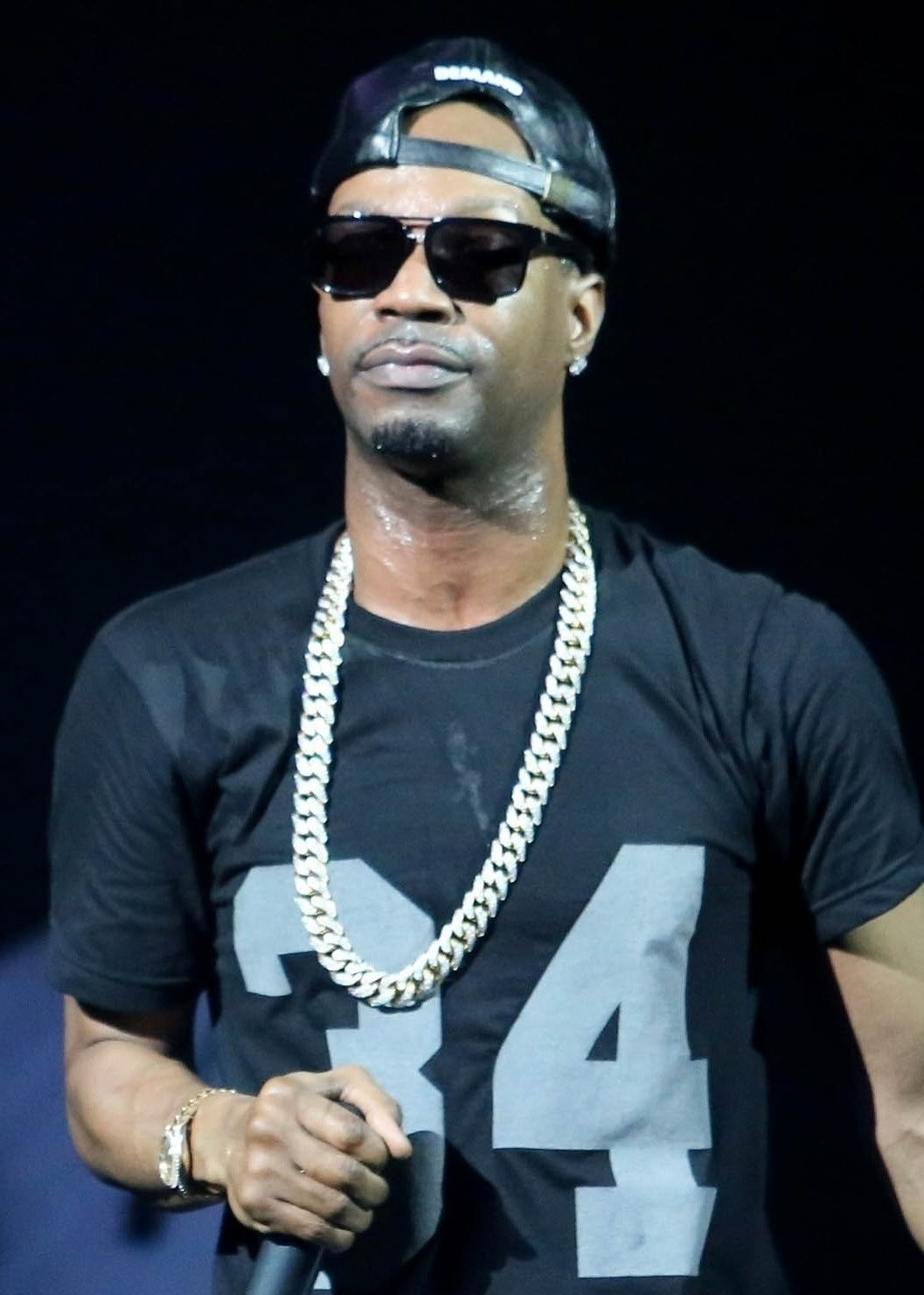
Juicy J featured on Flo's song "Pose", which samples "Pump Up the Jam".

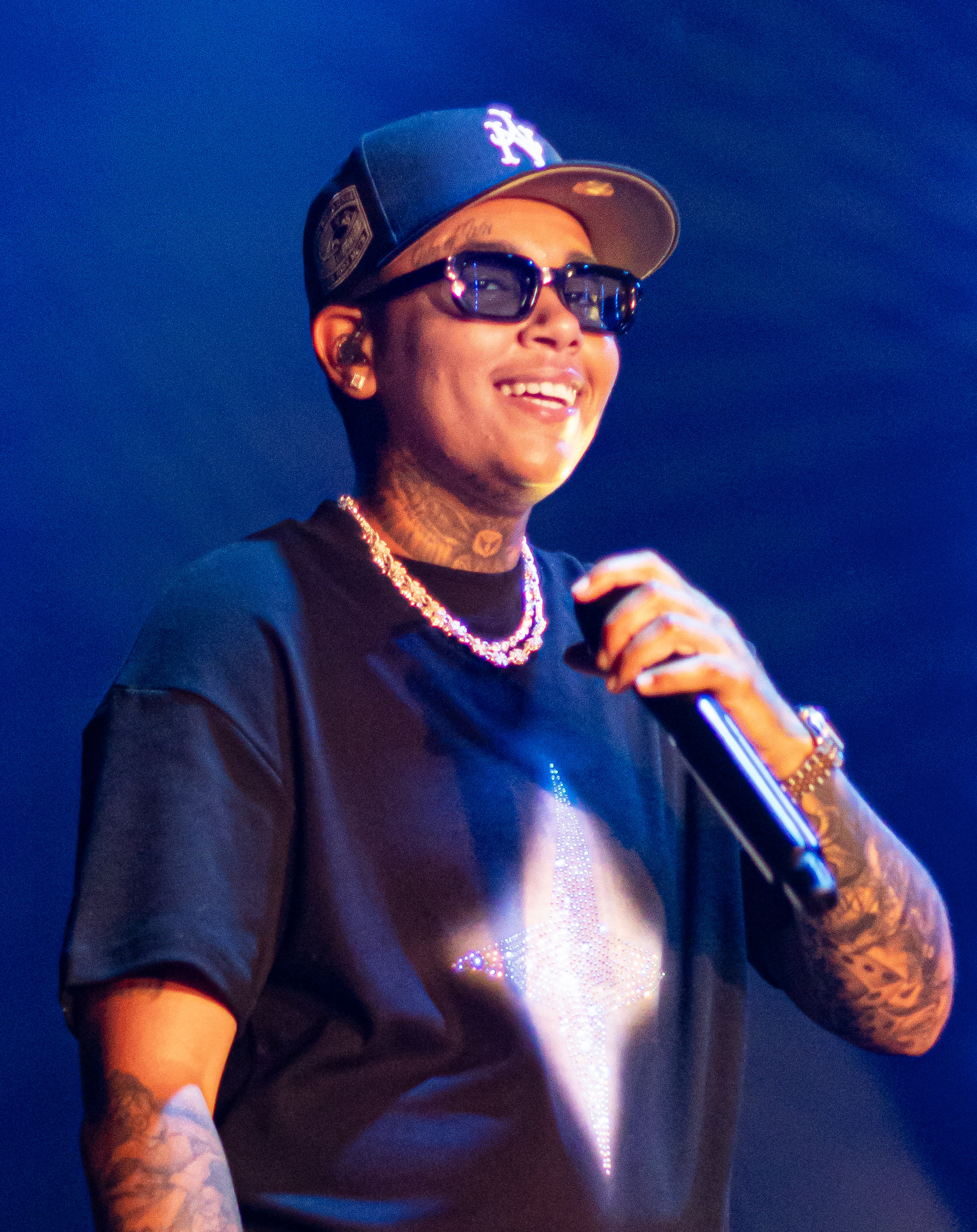
Flo have collaborated with Kwn twice.

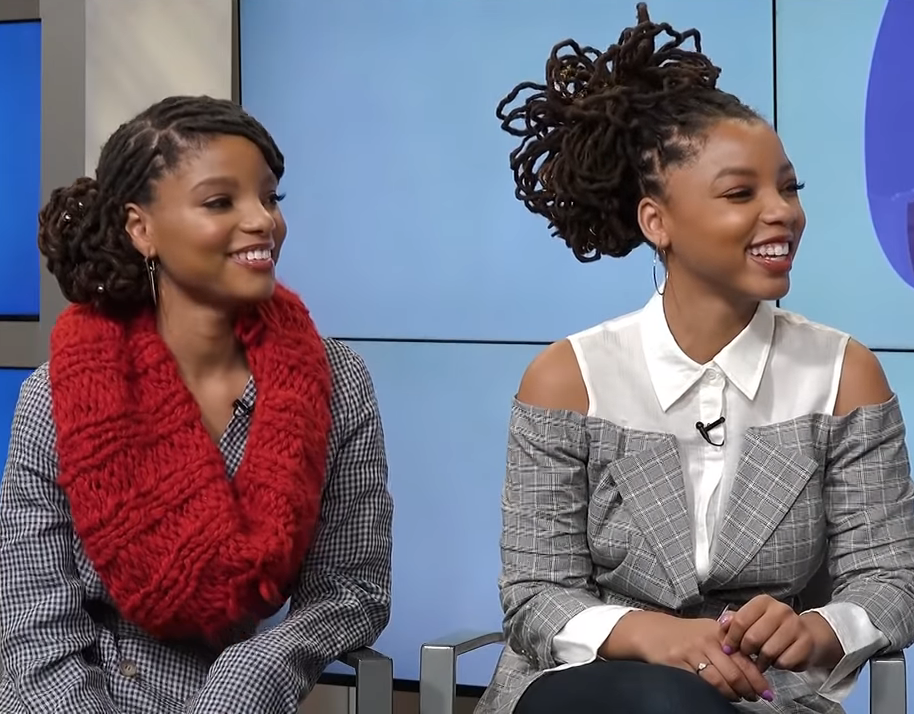
Sister duo Halle and Chloe Bailey featured on a remix of "Soft" in 2025.

Key
‡	Indicates a single release

Name of song, songwriter(s), originating album and year of release
Song	Artist(s)	Songwriter(s)	Originating album	Year	Ref.
"3 of Us"	Flo	Jorja Douglas; Stella Quaresma; Uzoechi Emenike; Ikeoluwa Oluwatobi Oladigbolu	3 of Us	2023	
"808"	Flo	Unknown	Therapy at the Club	2026	
"8 (Remix)"	Kehlani featuring Flo	Kehlani Parrish; Darius Dixson; Anthony Clemons, Jr. Jorja Douglas; Renée Downer; Stella Quaresma; Kwame Holland; Uzoechi Emenike; Aminata Kabba	While We Wait 2	2024	
"AAA"	Flo	Jorja Douglas; Renée Downer; Stella Quaresma; Rogét Chahayed; Uzoechi Emenike; Amber Streeter; Andrew Wansel; Mary Brockert	Access All Areas	2024	
"Act XVI: Twentyfoe7"	4Batz featuring Flo	Neko Bennett; Jorja Douglas; Renée Downer; Stella Quaresma; Fahem Erfan	Still Shinin	2025	
"Another Guy - Acoustic"	Flo	Jorja Douglas; Renée Downer; Stella Quaresma; Aston Rudi; Rashaan Brown	The Lead	2022	
"Bending My Rules"	Flo	Darhyl Camper Jr. Darius Dixson	Access All Areas	2024	
"Bending My Rules (Unlocked)"	Flo featyring Dixson	Darhyl Camper Jr. Darius Dixson	Access All Areas: Unlocked	2025	
"Body Language"	Flo	Unknown	Therapy at the Club	2026	
"Call Me"	Flo	Jorja Douglas; Renée Downer; Stella Quaresma; Uzoechi Emenike; Jelli Dorman; DuWayne Phinisey; Sevyn Streeter; Pop Wansel	Therapy at the Club	2026	
"Cardboard Box"	Flo	Jorja Douglas; Renée Downer; Stella Quaresma; Uzoechi Emenike; Savannah Jada	The Lead	2022	
"Caught Up"	Flo	Jorja Douglas; Renée Downer; Stella Quaresma; Jocelyn Donald; Uzoechi Emenike; Jahlil Gunter; Cole Porter; Amber Streeter; Andrew Wansel	Access All Areas	2024	
"Change"	Flo	Jorja Douglas; Renée Downer; Stella Quaresma; Tyler Hotston; Ryan Ashley; Uzoechi Emenike; Joe Gosling; Aminata Kabba	3 of Us	2023	
"Check"	Flo	Ryan Ashley; Kaelyn Behr; Uzoechi Emenike; Curtis Robertson Jr. Rudy Sandapa; Leon Ware; Syreeta Wright	Access All Areas	2024	
"Conceited"	Flo	Jorja Douglas; Renée Downer; Stella Quaresma; Aminata Kabba; Uzoechi Emenike; Dayo Olatunji; Tre Jean-Marie	Access All Areas	2024	
"Control Freak"	Flo	Renée Downer; Jamal Woon; Ryan Ashley; Talay Riley; Uzoechi Emenike	3 of Us	2023	
"Crash Out"	Josh Levi featuring Flo	Joshua Bolden; Jorja Douglas; Renée Downer; Stella Quaresma; Matthew Douglas Bernard; Gray Toomey; Uzoechi Emenike; Mike Snell; Hadar Adora; Carliann	Hydraulic	2025	
"Cry Ugly"	Flo	Jorja Douglas; Amy Allen; Warren Felder; Oscar Linnander; Boy Matthews; Jayme Silverstein	Therapy at the Club	2026	
"Do Too Much"	Flo	Uzoechi Emenike; Rowan Perkins; Alfons Kettner; Bobby Caldwell	Access All Areas	2024	
"Don't Break Her Heart"	Flo	Jorja Douglas; Renée Downer; Stella Quaresma; Julian Bunetta; Steph Jones	Therapy at the Club	2026	
"Feature Me"	Flo	Jorja Douglas; Renée Downer; Stella Quaresma; Aminata Kabba; Jamal Woon; Hannah Yadi; Timothy James Worthington; Rowan Perkins	The Lead	2022	
"Floating"	Flo	Jorja Douglas; Renée Downer; Stella Quaresma; Jonas Asker; Ryan Buendia; Gino Haddon; Jean-Baptiste Kouame; Sebastian Lundberg; Karl Rubin; Jacquez Swanigan; Victor Thell	Therapy at the Club	2026	
"Fly Girl"	Flo featuring Missy Elliott	Melissa Elliott; Renée Downer; Stella Quaresma; Camille Purcell	Non-album single	2023	
"Get It Till I'm Gone"	Flo	Jorja Douglas; Renée Downer; Stella Quaresma; Uzoechi Emenike; Aminata Kabba; Cole Ostrin; Kierran Rogers-Bedminster; Skippz; Jamal Woon	Access All Areas	2024	
"Get It Till I'm Gone (Remix)"	Flo featuring Chy Cartier	Jorja Douglas; Renée Downer; Stella Quaresma; Uzoechi Emenike; Aminata Kabba; Cole Ostrin; Kierran Rogers-Bedminster; Skippz; Jamal Woon	Non-album single	2025	
"Haterbooth"	Flo	Jorja Douglas; Renée Downer; Stella Quaresma; Darius Dixson; Jared Solomon	Therapy at the Club	2026	
"Hide & Seek (Flo remix)"	Stormzy featuring Flo	Jorja Douglas; Renée Downer; Stella Quaresma; Michael Ebenazer Kwadjo Omari Owuo, Jr. Owen Cutts; Richard Isong; Ras Kassa Alexander; Andrew Jason Brown; Temilade Openiyi	Non-album release	2023	
"How Does It Feel?"	Flo	Jorja Douglas; Renée Downer; Stella Quaresma; Uzoechi Emenike; William Hood; Jared Krumm; Daniel Muñoz; Sean Small; Sam Sumser; Chris Taylor; Theron Thomas	Access All Areas	2024	
"I Can't Be High Around You Anymore"	Flo	Renée Downer; Julian Bunetta; Lauren Keen; Kendrick Nicholls	Therapy at the Club	2026	
"Immature"	Flo	Jorja Douglas; Renée Downer; Stella Quaresma; Aminata Kabba; Uzoechi Emenike; Ryan Ashley; Jamal Woon	The Lead	2022	
"I'm Just a Girl"	Flo	Jorja Douglas; Renée Downer; Stella Quaresma; Rashaan Brown; Uzoechi Emenike; Lauren Keen; Skippz; Jamal Woon	Access All Areas	2024	
"In My Bag"	Flo featuring GloRilla	Lara Andersson; Grant Boutin; Taylor Parks; Emma Rosen; Albin Tengblad; Gloria Woods	Access All Areas	2024	
"Intro"	Flo featuring Cynthia Erivo	Jorja Douglas; Renée Downer; Stella Quaresma; Uzoechi Emenike; Curtis Kantsa; Kierran Rogers-Bedminster	Access All Areas	2024	
"IWH2BMX"	Flo	Jorja Douglas; Renée Downer; Stella Quaresma; Gabriel Davies; Uzoechi Emenike; Cole Ostrin; Talay Riley; Jamal Woon	Access All Areas	2024	
"IWH2BMX (Unlocked)"	Flo featuring Kehlani	Jorja Douglas; Renée Downer; Stella Quaresma; Gabriel Davies; Uzoechi Emenike; Cole Ostrin; Talay Riley; Jamal Woon; Kehlani Parrish	Access All Areas: Unlocked	2025	
"Leak It"	Flo	Jorja Douglas; Renée Downer; Stella Quaresma; Julian Bunetta; Steph Jones	Therapy at the Club	2026	
"Leave (Get Out)" {{small|(originally by JoJo)	Flo	Soulshock; Kenneth Karlin; Alex Cantrall; Phillip "Whitey" White	Apple Music Home Sessions: Flo	2022	
"Losing You"	Flo	Stella Quaresma; Tyler Hotston; Joe Gosling; Monique Laws; Dayo Olatunji; Talay Riley	Non-album single	2022	
"Mamacitas"	Flo	Jorja Douglas; Renée Downer; Stella Quaresma; Westen Weiss; Uzoechi Emenike; McCulloch Sutphin; Tyler Hotston	Goat	2026	
"Miss U Missing Me"	Flo	Jorja Douglas; Boy Matthews; Skippz	Therapy at the Club	2026	
"The Mood"	Flo with Kaytranada	Jorja Douglas; Renée Downer; Stella Quaresma; Louis Kevin Celestin; Uzoechi Emenike	Non-album single	2025	
"Nocturnal"	Flo	Ryan Ashley; Uzoechi Emenike; Jakob Rabitsch; Talay Riley	Access All Areas	2024	
"Nocturnal (Unlocked)"	Flo featuring Bree Runway	Ryan Ashley; Uzoechi Emenike; Jakob Rabitsch; Talay Riley; Brenda Mensah	Access All Areas: Unlocked	2025	`
"Not My Job"	Flo	Jorja Douglas; Renée Downer; Stella Quaresma; Uzoechi Emenike; Savannah Jada	The Lead	2022	
"On & On"	Flo	Matej Djajkovski; Fabien Herfray; Dante Jones; Yuval Haim Chain; Aminata Kabba	Access All Areas	2024	
"Pretty Eyes"	Sunkis featuring Flo	Anthony Germaine White; Akil King; Bianca Atterberry; Christopher Sung; Brian Holland; Michael Lovesmith; Brian Kennedy Seals	Non-album single	2026	
"Pose"	Flo featuring Juicy J	Stella Quaresma; Forest "4rest" Moore; Alivia Blue; Thomas De Quincey; Jordan Houston; Manuela Kamosi; Sevyn Streeter	Therapy at the Club	2026	
"Recently Deleted"	Flo	Jorja Douglas; Renée Downer; Stella Quaresma; Maleik Loveridge; Luc Foster; Daniel Taylor; Marl Farrell; Vania Khaleh-Pari; Sean Wander; Uzoechi Emenike	Access All Areas: Unlocked	2025	
"Remedied"	Flo	Jorja Douglas; Oscar Linnander; Jayme Silverstein; Amy Allen; Warren Felder	Therapy at the Club	2026	
"Say Less"	Flo	James Anderson; Joe Gosling; Talay Riley; Tyler Hotston	Access All Areas	2024	
"Sex in Peace"	Flo featuring Kwn	Jorja Douglas; Renée Downer; Stella Quaresma; Eric Bellinger; Felisha Harvey; Khyra Wilson	Therapy at the Club	2026	
"Shoulda Woulda Coulda"	Flo	Jorja Douglas; Renée Downer; Stella Quaresma; Mike Brainchild; Uzoechi Emenike; Lauren Keen	Access All Areas	2024	
"Side Effects"	Flo	Stella Quaresma; Forest "4rest" Moore; Jonah Christian	Therapy at the Club	2026	
"Small Doses"	Flo	Renée Downer; Boy Matthews	Therapy at the Club	2026	
"Soft"	Flo	Jorja Douglas; Renée Downer; Stella Quaresma; Darhyl Camper Jr. Darius Dixson	Access All Areas	2024	
"Soft (Unlocked)"	Flo featuring Chloe and Halle	Jorja Douglas; Renée Downer; Stella Quaresma; Chloe Bailey; Halle Bailey; Darhyl Camper Jr. Darius Dixson	Access All Areas: Unlocked	2025	
"Suite Life (Familiar)"	Flo featuring Bellah	Isobel Akpobire; Gaetan Judd; Uzoechi Emenike; Tyler Hotston	3 of Us	2023	
"Summertime"	Flo	Uzoechi Emenike; Aminata Kabba; Jamal Woon; Rashaan Brown; Tyler Hotston	The Lead	2022	
"Talk You Through It"	Kwn featuring Flo	K Wilson; Jorja Douglas; Renée Downer; Stella Quaresma	With All Due Respect	2025	
"Therapy at the Club"	Flo	Leroy Clampitt; Lauren Keen; Peter Rycroft	Therapy at the Club	2026	
"Touché"	Flo	Stella Quaresma; Forest "4rest" Moore; Alivia Blue; Sevyn Streeter	Therapy at the Club	2026	
"Trustworthy (Interlude)"	Flo	Jorja Douglas; Renée Downer; Stella Quaresma; Denisia Andrews; Brittany Coney; Uzoechi Emenike; Morten Ristorp	Access All Areas	2024	
"Walk Like This"	Flo	Jorja Douglas; Renée Downer; Stella Quaresma; Uzoechi Emenike; Tyler Hotston; Aminata Kabba; Talay Riley; Ashton Sellars	Access All Areas	2024	
"What's Meant for Me"	Flo	Unknown	Therapy at the Club	2026	
