= Access All Areas Tour (Flo) =

2025 concert tour by Flo

- Tour by Flo
- Promotional poster for European concerts
- Associated album: Access All Areas
- Start date: 9 April 2025
- End date: 11 October 2025
- No. of shows: 38
- Supporting acts: Chxrry; Jae Stephens; Sekou
- Producer: Live Nation

Flo concert chronology
- Flo Live (2023); Access All Areas Tour (2025); Therapy at the Club Tour (2027)

The Access All Areas (also abbreviated as AAA Tour) was the second concert tour held by British girl group Flo, in support of their debut studio album, Access All Areas (2024). The tour commenced on 9 April 2025 in Austin, United States, and finished on 11 October 2025 in Cologne, Germany.

== Announcements ==
On 1 November 2024, Flo announced the tour, with ten shows across Europe in March 2025. Tickets went on sale seven days later, with an artist pre-sale which ran for two days prior to the general dale dates. On 19 November of the same year, twenty-six concerts in North America were announced. Tickets went on sale on 22 November, with various pre-sales running through until 21 November. In February 2025, Chxrry and Jae Stephens were announced as supporting acs for the North American shows. On 4 March 2025, Flo announced the European concerts had been postponed, due to injuries Renée Downer sustained during rehearsal; the rescheduled shows were announced two months later.

== Shows ==
List of 2025 concerts
Date (2025)	City	Country	Venue	Supporting acts
9 April	Austin	United States	Emo's	Chxrry
11 April	Dallas	United States	South Side Ballroom	Chxrry
12 April	Houston	United States	House of Blues	Chxrry
15 April	Fort Lauderdale	United States	Revolution Live	Chxrry
16 April	Tampa	United States	The Ritz Ybor	Chxrry
18 April	Raleigh	United States	The Ritz	Chxrry
19 April	Atlanta	United States	Tabernacle	Chxrry
21 April	Brooklyn	United States	Brooklyn Paramount Theater	Chxrry
22 April	Brooklyn	United States	Brooklyn Paramount Theater	Chxrry
23 April	Philadelphia	United States	The Fillmore Philadelphia	Chxrry
25 April	Silver Spring	United States	The Fillmore Silver Spring	Chxrry
26 April	Norfolk	United States	The NorVa	Chxrry
28 April	Boston	United States	Citizens House of Blues Boston	Chxrry
29 April	Montreal	Canada	M Telus	Chxrry
1 May	Toronto	Canada	History	Chxrry
3 May	Chicago	United States	The Salt Shed	Jae Stephens
4 May	Detroit	United States	Saint Andrew's Hall	Jae Stephens
6 May	Minneapolis	United States	The Fillmore Minneapolis	Jae Stephens
8 May	Denver	United States	Summit	Jae Stephens
10 May	Phoenix	United States	The Van Buren	Jae Stephens
11 May	San Diego	United States	The Observatory North Park	Jae Stephens
12 May	Sacramento	United States	Ace of Spades	Jae Stephens
15 May	Portland	United States	Roseland Theater	Jae Stephens
16 May	Seattle	United States	The Showbox	Jae Stephens
18 May	Vancouver	Canada	Commodore Ballroom	Jae Stephens
20 May	San Francisco	United States	SF Masonic Auditorium	Jae Stephens
22 May	Los Angeles	United States	Hollywood Palladium	Jae Stephens
12 July (Note: This concert is part of Lollapalooza Berlin.)	Berlin	Germany	Olympiastadion	—N/a
19 July (Note: This concert is part of Somerset House Summer Series.)	London	England	Somerset House	—N/a
28 September (Note: These concerts were originally scheduled to take place in March 2025, but were postponed due to an injury Renée Downer incurred.)	London	England	O_{2} Academy Brixton	Sekou
29 September	Glasgow	Scotland	SWG3 Studio Warehouse	Sekou
1 October	Manchester	England	Manchester Academy	Sekou
2 October	Birmingham	England	O_{2} Academy Birmingham	Sekou
5 October	Utrecht	Netherlands	TivoliVredenburg	Sekou
6 October	Antwerp	Belgium	De Roma	Sekou
8 October	Paris	France	L'Olympia	Sekou
10 October	Hamburg	Germany	Docks	Sekou
11 October	Cologne	Germany	Live Music Hall	Sekou
