= Therapy at the Club Tour =

2027 concert tour by Flo

- Tour by Flo
- Associated album: Therapy at the Club
- Start date: 22 January 2027
- End date: 12 March 2027
- No. of shows: 22

Flo concert chronology
- Access All Areas Tour (2025); Therapy at the Club Tour (2027)

The Therapy at the Club Tour is the upcoming third concert tour by British girl group Flo, in support of their second studio album, Therapy at the Club (2026). The tour will begin on 22 January 2027 in Seattle, United States, and will conclude on 12 March 2027 in London, England.

== Announcements ==
On 5 October 2026, Flo announced the tour, with twenty-two shows across North America and Europe spanning from January to March 2027. Tickets are going on sale October 9, with an artist pre-sale running for two days prior to the general dale dates. The tour is scheduled to be Flo's biggest headlining tour so far.

== Shows ==
List of 2027 concerts
Date (2027)	City	Country	Venue
22 January	Seattle	United States	Moore Theatre
24 January	Sacramento	United States	Channel 24
26 January	San Francisco	United States	SF Masonic Auditorium
27 January	Inglewood (Note: Labeled as Los Angeles in promotion material.)	United States	YouTube Theater
29 January	San Diego	United States	SOMA San Diego
30 January	Phoenix	United States	The Van Buren
2 February	Houston	United States	Bayou Music Center
3 February	Irving (Note: Labeled as Dallas in promotion material.)	United States	The Pavilion at Toyota Music Factory
5 February	Birmingham	United States	Alabama Theatre
9 February	Orlando	United States	House of Blues
10 February	Cumberland (Note: Labeled as Atlanta in promotion material.)	United States	Coca-Cola Roxy
12 February	Boston	United States	MGM Music Hall at Fenway
13 February	New York City	United States	Radio City Music Hall
16 February	Philadelphia	United States	The Met
17 February	Washington, D.C.	United States	The Anthem
19 February	Chicago	United States	Aragon Ballroom
21 February	Toronto	Canada	Rebel
5 March	Cologne	Germany	Palladium
7 March	Amsterdam	Netherlands	AFAS Live
8 March	Paris	France	Zénith Paris
10 March	Manchester	England	O_{2} Apollo Manchester
12 March	London	England	OVO Arena Wembley
