= Flo (group) =

British girl group

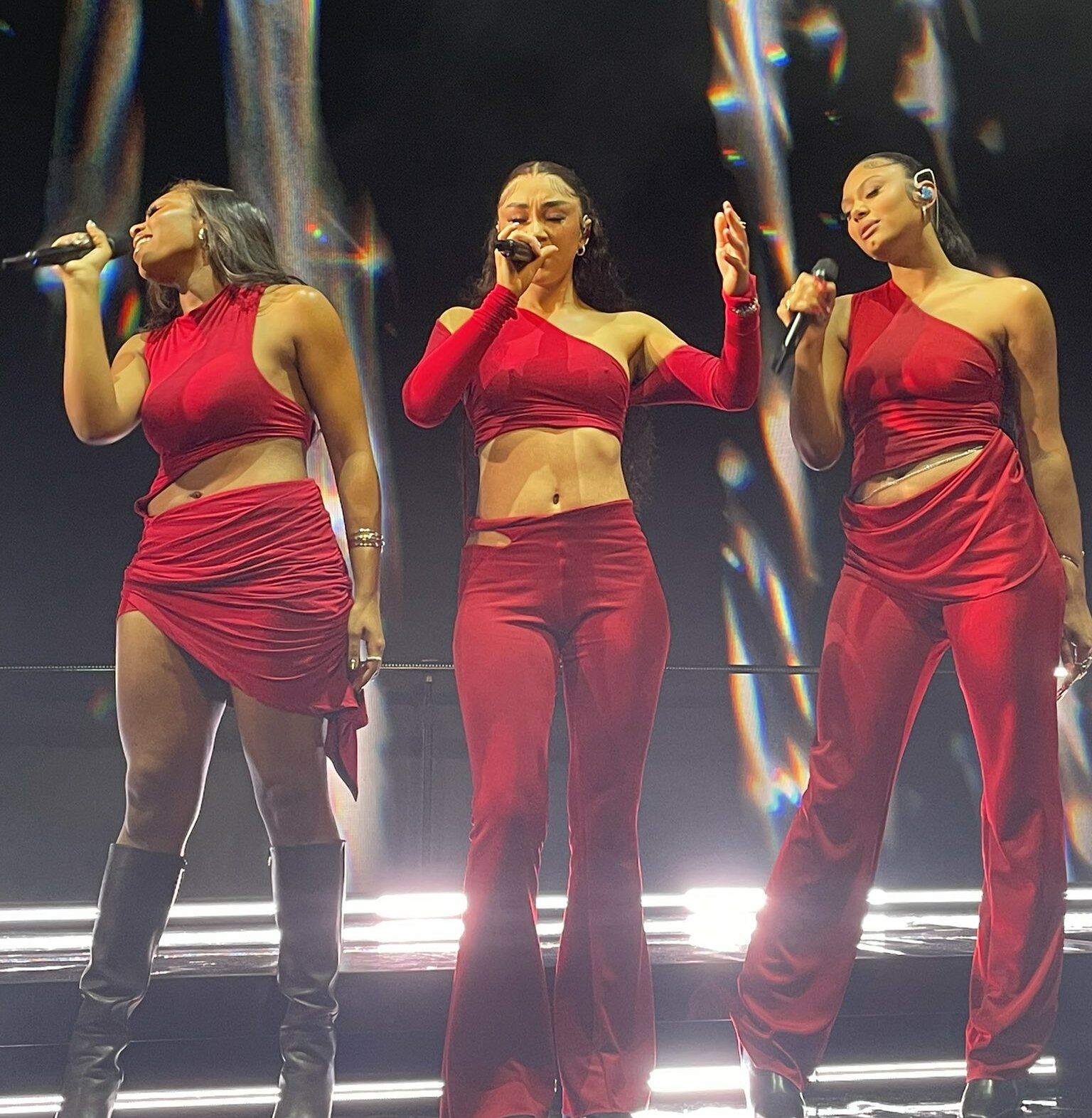
- From left: Renée Downer, Stella Quaresma and Jorja Douglas performing in 2023

Background information
- Origin: London, England
- Genres: R&B; pop
- Works: Discography; songs
- Years active: 2019–present
- Labels: Island; EMI
- Members: Stella Quaresma; Jorja Douglas; Renée Downer
- Website: flolikethis.com

Flo (commonly stylised in all caps) are a British girl group formed and signed with Island Records. The London-based group is composed of three members: Jorja Douglas, Stella Quaresma, and Renée Downer. The trio gained prominence for their debut single "Cardboard Box" (2022) after achieving viral popularity, and received a silver certification by the British Phonographic Industry (BPI).

The song preceded the release of the group's debut extended play (EP), The Lead (2022), and was met with positive reception despite failing to chart. Flo later surprise-released their second EP titled 3 of Us (2023), while performing their first concert tour. The group released their debut studio album Access All Areas (2024), which spawned a collaboration with American rapper GloRilla for "In My Bag". The album peaked at number three on the UK Albums Chart and saw moderate success on the Billboard 200. It also received a nomination for Best Progressive R&B Album at the 68th Annual Grammy Awards.

Flo are a recipient of several accolades, including the annual survey BBC Sound of... and the Brit Award for Rising Star. They were also nominated for Best Group and Best New Artist at the 23rd BET Awards.

== Career ==
=== 2019–2022: Formation and The Lead ===
The British girl group formed in 2019. Quaresma and Downer knew each other prior, having met studying at Sylvia Young Theatre School, and discovered Douglas from her singing videos on Instagram. After spending two years writing music, the trio recorded their debut song with producer MNEK. "Cardboard Box" was first released on 24 March 2022 after they signed to Island Records. The song performed well on social media, with established artists SZA and Victoria Monét praising it. An accompanying music video premiered in April, with an acoustic version being released the following month.

Performing for VevoDSCVR
- "Cardboard Box" by Flo on YouTube
- "Immature" by Flo on YouTube

Flo released their second song, "Immature", on 6 July 2022, with a music video uploaded the same week. During the promotion of the song, the trio announced and released their debut extended play (EP), The Lead, on 8 July 2022. Many music critics named the EP an "essential listen" while displaying the confidence and authority of the trio. Flo performed their first two songs on YouTube for VevoDSCVR in August. The trio re-released their project with an additional song, "Not My Job", on 14 September 2022.

The trio made their television debut for late-night talk programmes Jimmy Kimmel Live! and Later... with Jools Holland in October 2022. The next month, Flo performed "Feature Me" and "Not My Job" for Vevo, as they were included in VevoDSCVR's Artists to Watch 2023. The three were nominated at the 25th MOBO Awards and did their first medley performance. In December, they also became the first female group to top the annual survey BBC Sound of... and win the Brit Rising Star in the same year.

=== 2023–2025: 3 of Us and Access All Areas ===
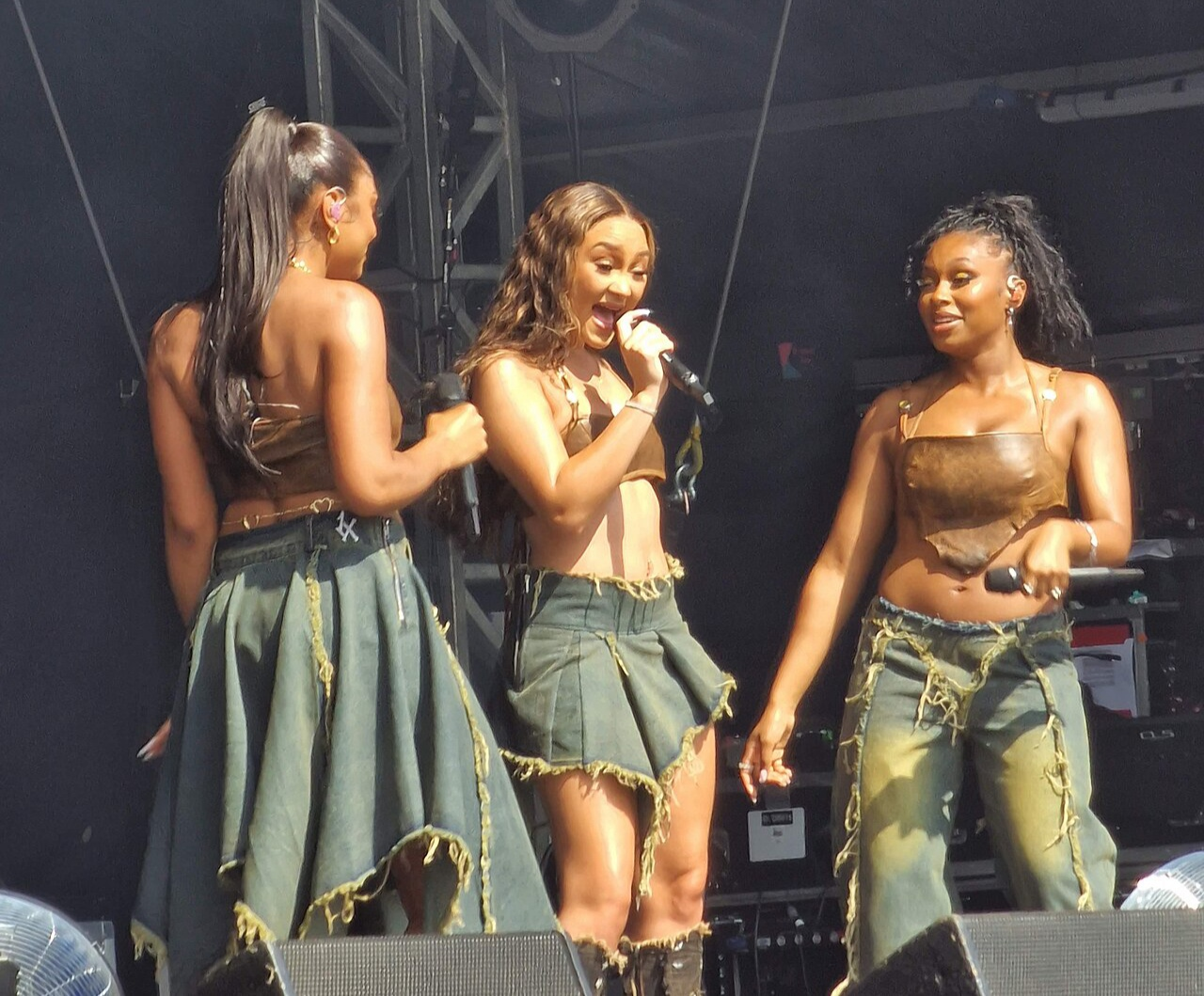
Flo performing at Mighty Hoopla in 2023, taking place in Brockwell Park

Flo were featured on a remix for British rapper Stormzy's song "Hide & Seek" in January 2023. Interviewed on radio programme Rocket Hour, singer Elton John asked if there was a studio album in progress, to which Downer replied: "There sure is. It's going to be amazing." The trio were later announced to perform at various summer festivals, including Big Weekend, Isle of Wight, Longitude, Summer Sonic and Wireless Festival. On social media, the group teased several snippets of an upcoming song featuring American rapper Missy Elliott. "Fly Girl" was released on 23 March 2023 and interpolated Elliott's hip-hop song "Work It" (2002), plus a new rap verse from herself. Seven days later, the trio embarked on their first concert tour, FLO Live in North America and Europe. Prior to their next show in Chicago, Flo made their third television appearance on The Tonight Show Starring Jimmy Fallon, where they performed "Fly Girl".

The trio performed for Capital's Summertime Ball at Wembley Stadium on 11 June 2023, and at Glastonbury Festival on 23 June. The same month, Flo received their first three nominations at the 23rd BET Awards which included Best Group. The next month, the three surprise-released their second EP, 3 of Us; two songs from the track listing had already been performed on their concert tour. Flo stated on social media that the release was a "gift" for fans who were awaiting new music. The girl group were nominated for Push Performance of the Year at the 2023 MTV Video Music Awards in August. They also received three nominations at the 36th Soul Train Awards in November: Best Group, Best New Artist and Best Collaboration for "Fly Girl" with Missy Elliott.

Flo released "Walk Like This" as the lead single from their debut studio album on 8 March 2024, with a music video released on 14 March. They later performed at Coachella 2024. Another song, "Caught Up", was released on 24 May with a music visualiser. A month later, the trio played at the Governors Ball. Flo released the third single from their debut album, "Check", on 2 August, with an accompanying music video. American singer Kehlani revealed the track listing for her mixtape, While We Wait 2 (2024), on which Flo appeared on the track titled "8". The group also were announced to open for Kehlani's Crash World Tour; it commenced on 4 September and concluded on 2 November. In 2024, Flo released two promotional singles from their debut album: "Bending My Rules" and "AAA". They revealed the title of their debut album as Access All Areas in August 2024. It was released 15 November 2024. The album featured collaborations with British actress Cynthia Erivo and American rapper GloRilla.

In 2025, Flo collaborated with Kaytranada on "The Mood". Later that year, they were nominated for their first Grammy award; Access All Areas was nominated for Best Progressive R&B Album at the 68th Annual Grammy Awards. Their nomination marked the first British female R&B act to be nominated since Floetry over twenty years prior. To commemorate the nomination, an "unlocked" version of Access All Areas was released, featuring four unreleased songs and various remixes with artists including Chloe x Halle, Kehlani, Bree Runway and Dixson.

=== 2026: Therapy at the Club ===
On 30 January 2026, Flo attended the MusiCares Person of the Year gala honouring Mariah Carey and covered her 1993 single "Dreamlover". On 4 February, they appeared on PlaqueBoyMax's live stream and previewed their single "Leak It". Also in February, Flo contributed the song "Mamacitas" to the soundtrack of the 2026 film Goat. "Leak It" was later confirmed as the lead single from their upcoming second studio album. Ahead of the song's release, the group were confirmed as performers at BBC Radio 1's Big Weekend for 2026. "Leak It" was released on 20 March 2026, with its music video premiering the same day. The single entered the UK Singles Chart at number 45.

Flo debuted "Leak It" live at the MOBO Awards 2026 and won their first award for Best R&B/Soul Act; the award was presented to them by the singers Leigh-Anne Pinnock and Keisha Buchanan. They were also nominated for Album of the Year and Best Female Act. In May 2026, Flo announced their second studio album, Therapy at the Club, with a release date scheduled for 24 July 2026. Alongside the announcement for the album, they released a single of the same name.. In June 2026, the group announced that the album had been delayed to 7 August 2026 due to Douglas' vocal cord surgery.

== Artistry ==
=== Musical style ===
"Cardboard Box" (2022)
A 24-second sample of "Cardboard Box".

Flo's style distinctly draws upon classic R&B, hip-hop and soul music, particularly from the 1990s and early 2000s. The group often covered R&B songs from that era at the beginning of their career on TikTok, particularly songs by Jazmine Sullivan and Lauryn Hill. The visuals for their debut music video "Cardboard Box" invited comparisons to that of TLC's "Unpretty" (1999) and the Sugababes' "Overload" (2000). In addition to the likes of Destiny's Child and the Spice Girls, H.E.R. was named as a more contemporary influence.

=== Influences ===
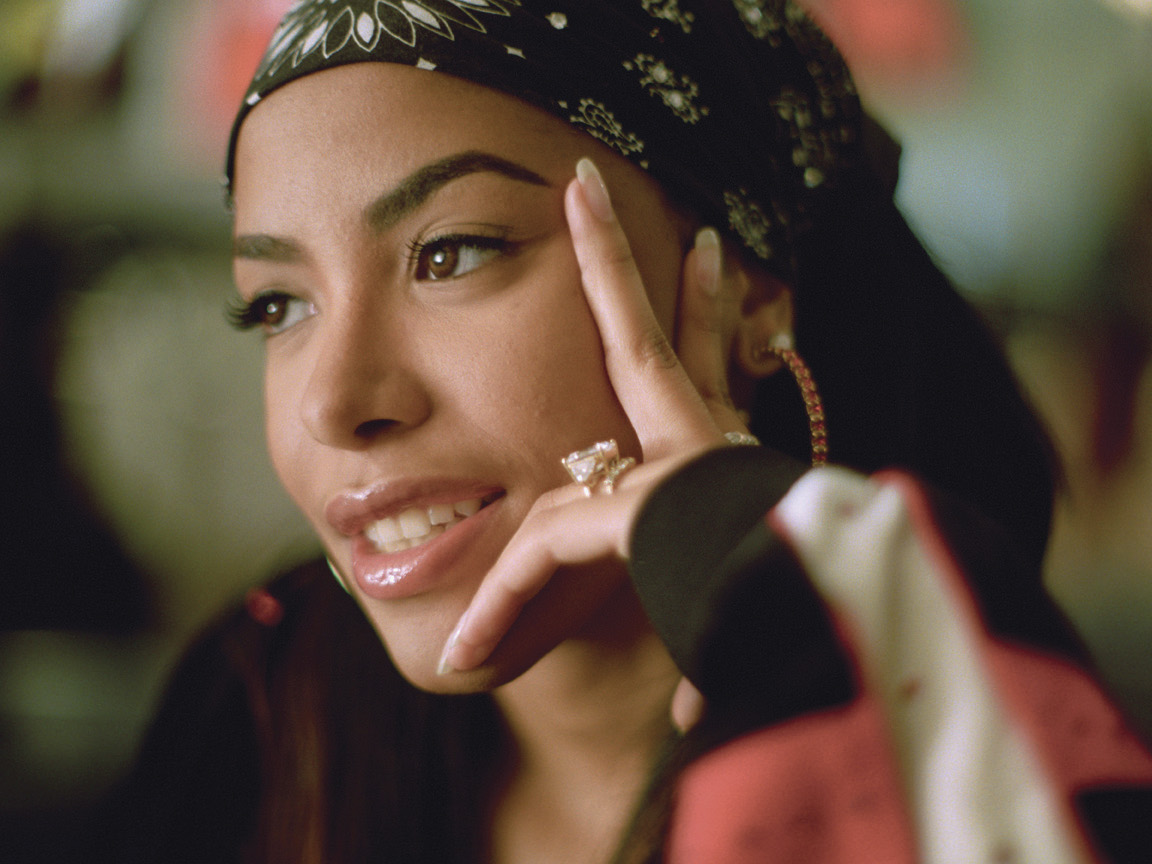
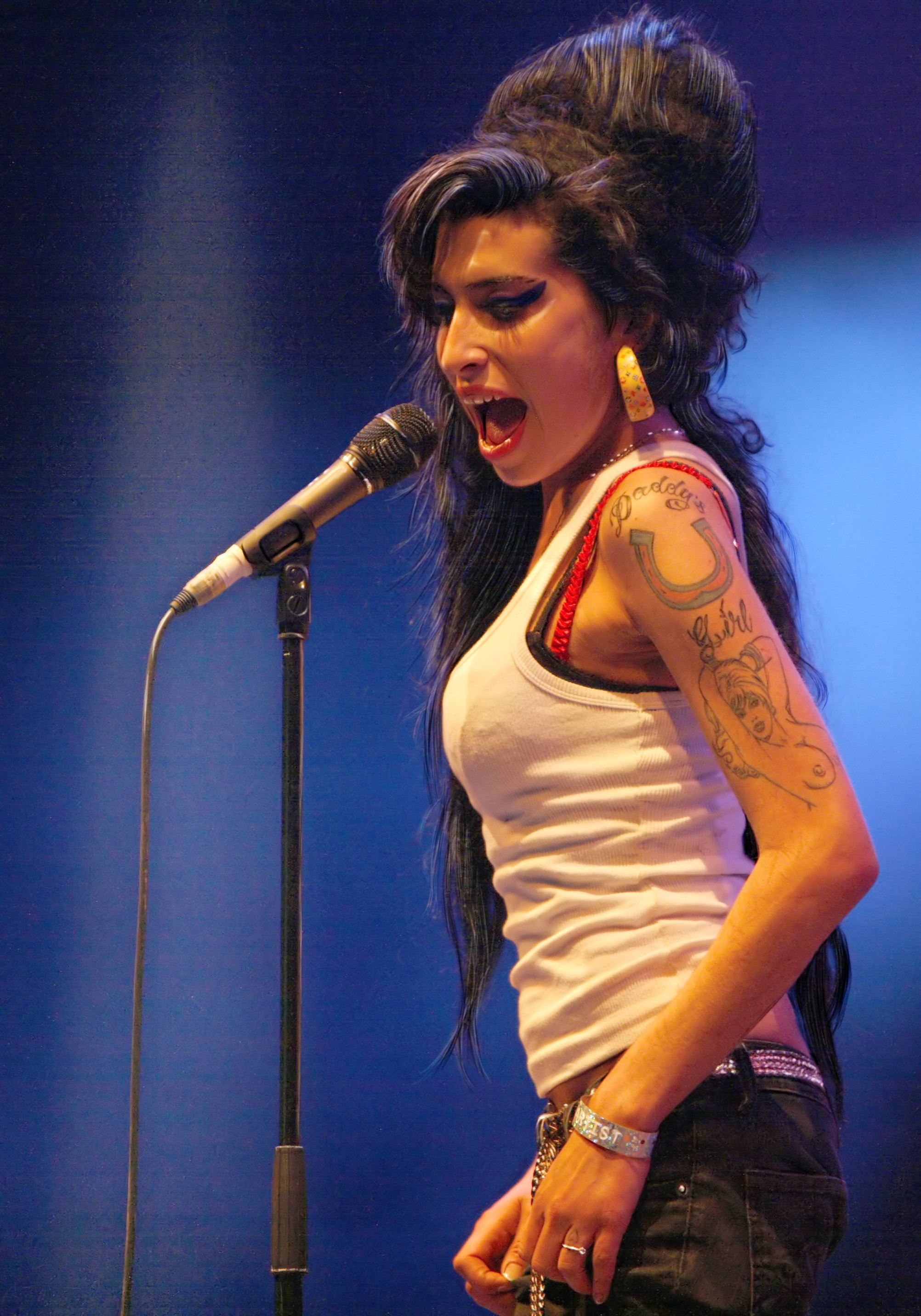
Aaliyah (left) and Amy Winehouse (right) have influenced Flo.

All three girls described being shaped by the music they grew up listening to; Downer's mother would play Aaliyah and Ciara in the car, and Douglas' mother was into "old school R&B". Quaresma heard African music from her father, while her mother would play Amy Winehouse and Etta James.

== Achievements ==
Flo has received numerous awards and nominations throughout their career, including a Brit Awards, Global Awards, and Sound of..., in addition to being nominated for one Grammy Award, two MTV VMAs, one NAACP Image Awards and three Soul Train Awards nominations. In December 2022, Flo won the Brit Awards and were nominated for the 25th MOBO Awards. In March 2023, they received the Rising Star Award at the Global Awards. On 26 June 2023, they were nominated for three categories, including Best New Artist, at the 2023 BET Awards, making them the group with the most nominations for the 2023 awards edition.

On 6 January 2023 Flo was placed on the NME 100 annual list of Essential Emerging Artists. They also appeared on the physical cover of one of the issues. In March 2023, they were named as one of Rolling Stone's 25 artists of the future. The same month, Flo was named Billboard's R&B/Hip-Hop Rookie of the Month. In April 2024, they were listed on the Europe's Forbes 30 under 30 list for 2024 in the Entertainment category.

== Members ==
I saw the girls and we screamed across the room. I knew from that moment we were about to start something big.

— Douglas on when the members met for the first time

Stella Dora Quaresma (born 28 November 2001 in Kingston upon Thames) moved to Mozambique at four weeks old. She moved back to the British countryside at the age of five, before returning to London, where she began attending the Sylvia Young Theatre School, where she met bandmate Renée Downer. Quaresma was a year above Downer. She grew up listening to African musical artists and her mother later introduced her to Etta James and British artists like Amy Winehouse. Prior to being in the group, she worked as a waitress.

Jorja Paige Douglas (2 January 2002 in Germany) moved to Hertfordshire at eight months old. She grew up listening to R&B music introduced to her by her mother. She is the daughter of former sprinter Stephi Douglas, and in 2017, she competed in and won the second series of the CBBC competition series Got What It Takes?. Prior to being in the group, Douglas worked for an accountancy firm.

Julian Renée Downer (born 23 September 2002) was raised in North London. She attended the Sylvia Young Theatre School, where she met bandmate Stella Quaresma, who was a year above Downer. She grew up listening to R&B, house and church gospel. Prior to being in the group, she worked at H&M on Regent Street.

== Discography ==
Studio albums

- Access All Areas (2024)
- Therapy at the Club (2026)

Extended plays

- The Lead (2022)
- 3 of Us (2023)

== Filmography ==
=== Television ===
List of television and films credits
Year	Title	Role	Channel	Notes	Ref.
2022	Jimmy Kimmel Live!	Themselves (musical guest)	ABC	Episode dated 6 October 2022	
2022	Later... with Jools Holland	Themselves (musical guest)	BBC Two	Episode dated 29 October 2022	
2023	The Tonight Show Starring Jimmy Fallon	Themselves (musical guest)	NBC	Episode dated 20 April 2023	
2024	The Graham Norton Show	Themselves (musical guest)	BBC One	Episode dated 13 December 2024	
2025	The Late Show with Stephen Colbert	Themselves (musical guest)	CBS	Episode dated 29 January 2025	
2025	Ina's Nacht	Themselves (musical guest)	NDR	Episode dated 23 July 2026	

== Tours ==
=== Headlining ===
- Flo Live (2023)
- Access All Areas Tour (2025)
- Therapy at the Club Tour (2026)

=== Supporting ===
- Kehlani – Crash World Tour (2024)
