= Access All Areas (Flo album) =

Studio album by Flo
- Released: 15 November 2024
- Genre: R&B
- Length: 46:55
- Label: Island
- Producers: Luc Bernadel; Mike Brainchild; Darhyl Camper Jr.; Rogét Chahayed; Cole YoursTruly; Gabriel Davies; Renée Downer; IQ; Dante Jones; Kierran; MNEK; Nova Wav; Relyt; Rissi; Rudy Sandapa; Ashton Sellars; Skippz; Sean Small; Styalz Fuego; Sam Sumser; Albin Tengblad; Pop Wansel; Jamal Woon; uv killin em; Yakob; Tre Jean-Marie

Flo chronology
| 3 of Us (2023) | Access All Areas (2024) | Therapy at the Club (2026) |

Singles from Access All Areas
- 1. "Walk Like This" Released: 8 March 2024; 2. "Caught Up" Released: 24 May 2024; 3. "Check" Released: 2 August 2024; 4. "In My Bag" Released: 15 November 2024; 5. "On & On" Released: 7 February 2025; 6. "Get It Till I'm Gone" Released: 21 March 2025; 7. "Recently Deleted" Released: 12 December 2025

Access All Areas is the debut studio album by the English girl group Flo. It was released on 15 November 2024 through Island Records. It marks the group's first full-length project after releasing two extended plays: The Lead (2022) and 3 of Us (2023). The standard version of Access All Areas features guest vocals from Cynthia Erivo and GloRilla, while the "Unlocked" version includes guest vocals from Chlöe, Halle, Kehlani, Bree Runway and Dixson.

Access All Areas received generally positive reviews from critics. The album was preceded by three singles—"Walk Like This", "Caught Up", and "Check"—and two promotional singles, while a fourth single, "In My Bag", coincided with the album release. It is a contemporary R&B album featuring production and songwriting from MNEK and notable contributions from Camper, Jay Versace, Pop Wansel, Sevyn Streeter, and more. At the 68th Annual Grammy Awards, Access All Areas was nominated for Best Progressive R&B Album.

== Background ==
On 3 July 2023, Flo surprise announced their second EP, 3 of Us as a "gift" to their fans for patiently waiting for new music. Before releasing the singles "Walk Like This" and "Caught Up" for the debut project, the group was announced as an opening act for singer Kehlani's Crash World Tour for the fall.

Prior to the announcement of Access All Areas, the group described the album as a continuation of the legacy of girl groups:

Access All Areas is a labour of love. To us it represents our growth and dedication to making girl group history, to making a project we are truly proud to call our debut album.

== Release and promotion ==
=== Singles ===
The album's first single, "Walk Like This" was released on 8 March 2024 after being previewed on TikTok weeks back, and the accompanying music video released a week later. The single was Flo's first single since "Fly Girl" with American rapper Missy Elliott in 2023. The group, then, revealed there would be at least 17 songs on the album after posting a picture of an unconfirmed tracklist on a drawing board on social media. On 24 May 2024, Flo released the second single for the album, "Caught Up", along with the visualizer.

On 2 August 2024, Flo released the third single for the album, "Check". After officially announcing the album's title, artwork, and release date on the same month, the group released pre-orders for vinyl, CDs, and exclusive bundles that include an autographed ticket, and three bonus tracks.

On 10 November 2024, Flo revealed the official tracklist of the album, revealing collaborations with singer and actress Cynthia Erivo and rapper GloRilla.

Three days after the album's initial release, Flo hinted at "unlocking" features, and released a deluxe edition titled Access All Areas: Unlocked featuring extended remixes with collaborations from Chlöe, Halle, Dixson, Kehlani, and Bree Runway. The group, alongside Chlöe and Halle, all hinted a collaboration before the album's release.

On 7 February 2025 Flo uploaded an official lyric video for "On & On" to YouTube, marking its release as the 5th single after an influx of airplay of the song on US R&B radio. Flo initially was going to make "Soft" the 5th single after the song gained almost 2 million streams in its first month. Flo also hinted at wanting "Get It Till I'm Gone" to be the 5th single on TikTok.

=== Promotional Singles ===
The group released two promotional songs in total for the album. On 30 August, "Bending My Rules" was released as the first promotional single, which they performed live for Vevo Studios,. On 1 November, the album's title track, "AAA", was released as the second & final promotional single. A music video was released on 9 November.

=== Tour ===
On 1 November 2024, Flo announced the Access All Areas Tour, which will visit Europe and the United Kingdom.

=== Other Promotional Material ===
On 7 November 2024, Flo partnered with AMC Theatres to give their fans an early listen to the album in select theatres in the United States.

== Commercial performance ==
Access All Areas debuted on the UK Albums Chart at number three, selling 9,500 album-equivalent units in its first week and becoming highest-charting album by a British R&B girl group in 23 years. The album remained on the chart for one week, while spending two weeks each on the UK Album Downloads Chart and the UK Album Sales Chart. It also reached number one on the UK R&B Albums Chart, where it spent three weeks in the top-ten. In Scotland, the album reached number ten on the Scottish Albums Chart.

In the United States, Access All Areas became Flo's first project to appear on the Billboard 200, debuting at number 163. Additionally, the album charted in the lower regions of the album charts in Belgium (Flanders) and France, reaching number 127 and number 188 on each, respectively. In Portugal, the album debuted at number 182 on the Portugal Streaming Albums chart.

== Critical reception ==
Professional ratings
Aggregate scores
| Source | Rating |
|---|---|
| AnyDecentMusic? | 6.7/10 |
| Metacritic | 68/100 |
Review scores
| Source | Rating |
| Clash | 7/10 |
| DIY | 4.5/5 stars |
| The Guardian | 3/5 stars |
| The Independent | 2/5 stars |
| The Line of Best Fit | 7/10 |
| NME | 4/5 stars |
| Pitchfork | 8/10 |
| The Rolling Stone | 3/5 stars |
| The Skinny | 4/5 stars |
| The Telegraph | 3/5 stars |

Access All Areas received generally positive reviews from music critics upon release. According to the review aggregator Metacritic, Access All Areas received "generally favorable reviews" based on a weighted average score of 68 out of 100 from 9 critic scores.

Puah Ziwei of NME described Flo as "having it all down: the talent, charisma and star power" on Access All Areas, with the album having "plenty of anthemic, showstopping vocal moments". Clover Hope of Pitchfork praised the album as a solid debut, referring to the project as a "confident vision of what a modern girl group can be: tender, headstrong, and unified", while suggesting influences from girl groups Destiny's Child and TLC on tracks such as "In My Bag" and "Nocturnal". Amy Perdoni of The Line of Best Fit dubbed Access All Areas as an album with "a number of remarkable pop, soul, and R&B fusions", highlighting "Check" as a standout track from the album, describing it as "maybe their most upbeat yet" and "the style of track allowing the group to gleam brighter and richer".

A more mixed review came from Alexis Petridis of The Guardian, who described the project as a "solid start", and noted the influences from SWV and Destiny's Child, but criticised the lack of a stand-out track, and felt that "a sense of innovation is lacking" as found on prior iconic girl-group hits such as the Sugababes' "Freak Like Me". Similarly, Annabel Nugent and Roisin O'Connor of The Independent felt that the album failed to produce "stadium-filler" songs, describing the project as sticking to "generic themes about love", although offering praise to the group's vocal ability and producer MNEK's vocal-layering work on the tracks “How Does It Feel” and “Bending My Rules”. Larisha Paul of Rolling Stone highlighted Flo's "infectious confidence" on "standouts" "How Does It Feel?" and "In My Bag", describing the latter as being "boosted by a vibrant feature from GloRilla", however felt that at times the record "stumbles over its ambition to lean into the classic R&B playbook while remaining experimental".

== Track listing ==
Access All Areas – Standard edition
| No. | Title | Writer(s) | Producer(s) | Length |
|---|---|---|---|---|
| 1. | "Intro" (featuring Cynthia Erivo) | Jorja Douglas; Renée Downer; Stella Quaresma; Uzoechi Emenike; Curtis Kantsa; Kierran Rogers-Bedminster | Kierran; MNEK^{[c]}^{[v]}; Relyt^{[a]} | 2:40 |
| 2. | "AAA" | Douglas; Downer; Quaresma; Rogét Chahayed; Emenike; Amber Streeter; Andrew Wansel; Mary Brockert | Pop Wansel; Chahayed; MNEK^{[a]}^{[v]} | 3:24 |
| 3. | "In My Bag" (featuring GloRilla) | Lara Andersson; Grant Boutin; Taylor Parks; Emma Rosen; Albin Tengblad; Gloria Woods | Tengblad; MNEK^{[p]}; Boutin^{[a]}; Styalz Fuego^{[a]}; Jess Jackson^{[v]} | 3:08 |
| 4. | "Walk Like This" | Douglas; Downer; Quaresma; Emenike; Tyler Hotston; Aminata Kabba; Talay Riley; Ashton Sellars | Relyt; Sellars; MNEK^{[c]}^{[v]} | 3:17 |
| 5. | "How Does It Feel?" | Douglas; Downer; Quaresma; Emenike; William Hood; Jared Krumm; Daniel Muñoz; Sean Small; Sam Sumser; Chris Taylor; Theron Thomas | IQ; Luc Bernadel; Sumser; Small; Thomas; MNEK^{[a]}^{[v]} | 3:08 |
| 6. | "Soft" | Douglas; Downer; Quaresma; Darhyl Camper Jr.; Darius Dixson | Camper; MNEK^{[a]}^{[v]} | 2:10 |
| 7. | "Check" | Ryan Ashley; Kaelyn Behr; Emenike; Curtis Robertson Jr.; Rudy Sandapa; Leon Ware; Syreeta Wright | Styalz Fuego; Sandapa; MNEK^{[p]}; Ashley^{[v]} | 2:45 |
| 8. | "On & On" | Matej Djajkovski; Fabien Herfray; Dante Jones; Yuval Haim Chain; Kabba | Jones; MNEK^{[p]}; BigSlav^{[c]}; Uv Killin Em^{[c]}; Kabba^{[v]} | 3:21 |
| 9. | "Bending My Rules" | Camper; Dixson | Camper; MNEK^{[p]} | 3:44 |
| 10. | "Trustworthy (Interlude)" | Douglas; Downer; Quaresma; Denisia Andrews; Brittany Coney; Emenike; Morten Ristorp | Nova Wav; Rissi; MNEK^{[a]}^{[v]}; Sillkey^{[a]} | 1:36 |
| 11. | "Caught Up" | Douglas; Downer; Quaresma; Jocelyn Donald; Emenike; Jahlil Gunter; Cole Porter; Streeter; Wansel | Pop Wansel; Jay Versace^{[c]}; MNEK^{[a]}^{[v]} | 3:50 |
| 12. | "IWH2BMX" | Douglas; Downer; Quaresma; Gabriel Davies; Emenike; Cole Ostrin; Riley; Jamal Woon | Cole YoursTruly; Davies; Woon; MNEK^{[a]}^{[v]}; Skippz^{[a]} | 2:43 |
| 13. | "Nocturnal" | Ashley; Emenike; Jakob Rabitsch; Riley | Downer; Yakob; MNEK^{[c]}^{[v]} | 2:03 |
| 14. | "Shoulda Woulda Coulda" | Douglas; Downer; Quaresma; Mike Brainchild; Emenike; Lauren Keen | Brainchild; MNEK^{[a]}^{[v]} | 3:46 |
| 15. | "Get It Till I'm Gone" | Douglas; Downer; Quaresma; Emenike; Kabba; Ostrin; Rogers-Bedminster; Skippz; Woon | Skippz; MNEK; Justin A. Walker ^{[a]}^{[v]} | 3:00 |
| 16. | "I'm Just a Girl" | Douglas; Downer; Quaresma; Rashaan Brown; Emenike; Keen; Skippz; Woon | Woon; Skippz; MNEK^{[a]}^{[v]} | 2:20 |
| Total length: | | | | 46:55 |

Access All Areas – Jorja CD bonus track
| No. | Title | Writer(s) | Producer(s) | Length |
|---|---|---|---|---|
| 17. | "Do Too Much" | Emenike; Rowan Perkins; Alfons Kettner; Bobby Caldwell | LOXE; MNEK^{[a]}^{[v]} | 3:20 |

Access All Areas – Renée CD bonus track
| No. | Title | Writer(s) | Producer(s) | Length |
|---|---|---|---|---|
| 17. | "Conceited" | Douglas; Downer; Quaresma; Kabba; Emenike; Dayo Olatunji; Tre Jean-Marie | Jean-Marie; MNEK^{[v]} | 2:34 |

Access All Areas – Stella CD bonus track
| No. | Title | Writer(s) | Producer(s) | Length |
|---|---|---|---|---|
| 17. | "Say Less" | James Anderson; Joe Gosling; Riley; Hotston | RELYT; Joe Gosling | 3:03 |

Access All Areas: Unlocked disc 2 – digital release
| No. | Title | Writer(s) | Producer(s) | Length |
|---|---|---|---|---|
| 1. | "Soft" (Unlocked; featuring Chlöe and Halle) | Douglas; Downer; Quaresma; Chloe Bailey; Halle Bailey; Camper Jr.; Dixson | Camper; MNEK^{[a]}^{[v]} | 3:10 |
| 2. | "Bending My Rules" (Unlocked; featuring Dixson) | Camper; Dixson | Camper; MNEK^{[p]} | 4:47 |
| 3. | "IWH2BMX" (Unlocked; featuring Kehlani) | Douglas; Downer; Quaresma; Davies; Emenike; Ostrin; Riley; Woon; Kehlani Parrish | Cole YoursTruly; Davies; Woon; MNEK^{[a]}^{[v]}; Skippz^{[a]} | 2:45 |
| 4. | "Nocturnal" (Unlocked; featuring Bree Runway) | Ashley; Emenike; Rabitsch; Riley; Brenda Mensah | Downer; Yakob; MNEK^{[c]}^{[v]} | 2:37 |
| 5. | "Bending My Rules" (Vevo Live) | Camper; Dixson | Camper; MNEK^{[p]} | 3:50 |

Notes

- ^{^[p]} signifies a primary and vocal producer.
- ^{^[c]} signifies a co-producer.
- ^{^[a]} signifies an additional producer.
- ^{^[v]} signifies a vocal producer.
- "AAA" interpolates "Portuguese Love", as written and performed by Teena Marie.
- "Check" samples "I Too Am Wanting," written by Curtis Robertson Jr. and Leon Ware, as performed by Syreeta Wright.
- "Caught Up" samples "Night and Day," composed by Cole Porter for the 1932 musical, Gay Divorce; as performed by Joe Pass.
- "Do Too Much" interpolates "What You Won't Do for Love", written by Alfons Kettner, as performed by Bobby Caldwell, and samples "Do for Love", as performed by 2Pac.
- A new track titled "Recently Deleted", along with the previous CD bonus tracks were later included in a digital reissue, at the beginning of the Unlocked portion of the album.

== Personnel ==
Flo

- Jorja Douglas – vocals
- Renée Downer – vocals
- Stella Quaresma – vocals

Additional musicians

- MNEK – programming, synthesizer pads (tracks 1, 2, 4–8, 11–16); keyboards (1, 2, 4–6, 8, 10–16), background vocals (4), vocal programming (6)
- Relyt – keyboards (tracks 1, 4), drums (4), piano (4), strings (4)
- Wired Strings (Note: Wired Strings consists of: cellist Rosie Danvers; violists Emma Owens and Jordan Bergmans; and violinists Jenny Sacha, Kerenza Peacock, Natalia Bonner, Patrick Kiernan, and Steve Morris.) – strings (tracks 1, 2, 6, 10, 14)
- Ashton Sellars – guitar (track 1); bass guitar, bells (4)
- Kierran – programming (track 1)
- Cynthia Erivo – spoken word (track 1)
- Pop Wansel – keyboards, programming (tracks 2, 11)
- Rogét Chahayed – keyboards, programming (track 2)
- Albin Tengblad – guitar, keyboards, synth pads (track 3)
- Tayla Parx – background vocals (track 3)
- Kz – programming (track 3)
- Grant Boutin – programming (track 3)
- Rudy Sandapa – strings (track 3)
- Alexander Lewis – trombone (track 3)
- Kyla Moscovich – trumpet (track 3)
- GloRilla – vocals (track 3)
- Darhyl Camper, Jr. – drums, guitar, piano (tracks 6, 9)
- Ryan Ashley – background vocals (track 7)
- Aminata Kabba – background vocals (tracks 8, 12)
- Sillkey – synthesizer (track 10)
- Jay Versace – keyboards, programming (track 11)
- Yakob – bass, drum programming, synthesizer (track 13)
- Hayley Yum – background vocals (tracks 14, 15)
- Mike Brainchild – bass, drum programming, guitar, keyboards, synthesizer pads (track 14)
- Curtis Kantsa – spoken word (track 14)
- Rashaan Brown – guitar (tracks 15, 16)
- Jamal Woon – additional keyboards (track 15); drum programming, programming (16)
- Skippz – piano (track 15); drum programming, programming (16)
- Chlöe – vocals (disc 2, track 1)
- Halle – vocals (disc 2, track 1)
- Dixson – vocals (disc 2, track 2)
- Kehlani – vocals (disc 2, track 3)
- Bree Runway – vocals (disc 2, track 4)

Technical

- Ohad Nissim – mastering (tracks 1, 2, 5–16)
- Chris Gehringer – mastering (track 3)
- Joe LaPorta – mastering (track 4)
- Patrizio "Teezio" Pigliapoco – mixing (tracks 1, 2, 4–16)
- Serban Ghenea – mixing (track 3)
- MNEK – engineering, vocal arrangement (all tracks); string arrangement (tracks 1, 2, 6, 14), horn arrangement (3), vocal engineering (7)
- Ben Loveland – engineering (tracks 1, 2, 10, 14)
- TommyD – engineering (track 2), string arrangement (1, 6, 10, 14)
- Greg Eliason – engineering (track 2)
- Relyt – engineering, vocal engineering, additional mixing (track 4)
- Pop Wansel – additional engineering (track 11)
- Federico Giordano – mixing assistance (tracks 1, 2, 4–16)
- Ignacio Portales – mixing assistance (tracks 1, 2, 4–16)
- Bryce Bordone – mixing assistance (track 3)
- Dillon Brophy – mixing assistance (track 3)
- Rosie Danvers – string arrangement (tracks 1, 2, 6, 10, 14)
- Sillkey – string arrangement (track 10)
- Mike Brainchild – string arrangement (track 14)
- Alexander Lewis – horn arrangement (track 3)
- Kyla Moscovich – horn arrangement (track 3)
- Tayla Parx – vocal arrangement (track 3)

== Charts ==
Chart performance for Access All Areas
| Chart (2024) | Peak position |
|---|---|
| Belgian Albums (Ultratop Flanders) | 127 |
| French Albums (SNEP) | 182 |
| Portugal Streaming Albums (AFP) | 182 |
| Scottish Albums (Official Charts) | 10 |
| UK Albums (Official Charts) | 3 |
| UK R&B Albums (Official Charts) | 1 |
| US Billboard 200 | 163 |
| US Top R&B Albums (Billboard) | 20 |

== Release history ==
Release dates and formats for Access All Areas
| Region | Date | Format(s) | Label | Ref. |
|---|---|---|---|---|
| Various | 15 November 2024 | CD; digital download; streaming; vinyl | Island | |

== See also ==
- Backstage pass
