= Flo Live =

2023 concert tour by Flo

- Tour by Flo
- Promotional poster
- Associated album: The Lead
- Start date: 30 March 2023
- End date: 20 August 2023
- No. of shows: 13 (17 scheduled)
- Supporting acts: Natanya; Tiana Blake; Donnie Sunshine; Samaria

Flo concert chronology
- Flo Live (2023); Access All Areas Tour (2025)

Flo Live (stylized as FLO Live) was the first concert tour held by British girl group Flo. It was launched in support of their debut extended play, The Lead (2022). The tour was announced on 4 November 2022, and started in London, England, on 30 March 2023, and concluded at the Summer Sonic Festival in Chiba, Japan, on 20 August 2023.

== Background ==
The British girl group was formed in early 2019 and debuted their single "Cardboard Box" (2022). Upon its release, the song gained popularity through Instagram, Twitter and TikTok. In July, they released a second single named "Immature" (2022), and the trio announced their debut extended play will be released soon. On 8 July 2022, the British trio released The Lead, which is mostly produced by MNEK.

The trio announced two shows located in the United Kingdom, named Flo Live. The trio later revealed their first North American tour in late January, comprising seven dates, and is set to begin on 13 April 2023, in Atlanta, Georgia, and set to conclude on 27 April 2023, in Los Angeles, California. The pre-sale took place on February 2, 2023, with the general sale taking place the next day on February 3.

== Critical reception ==
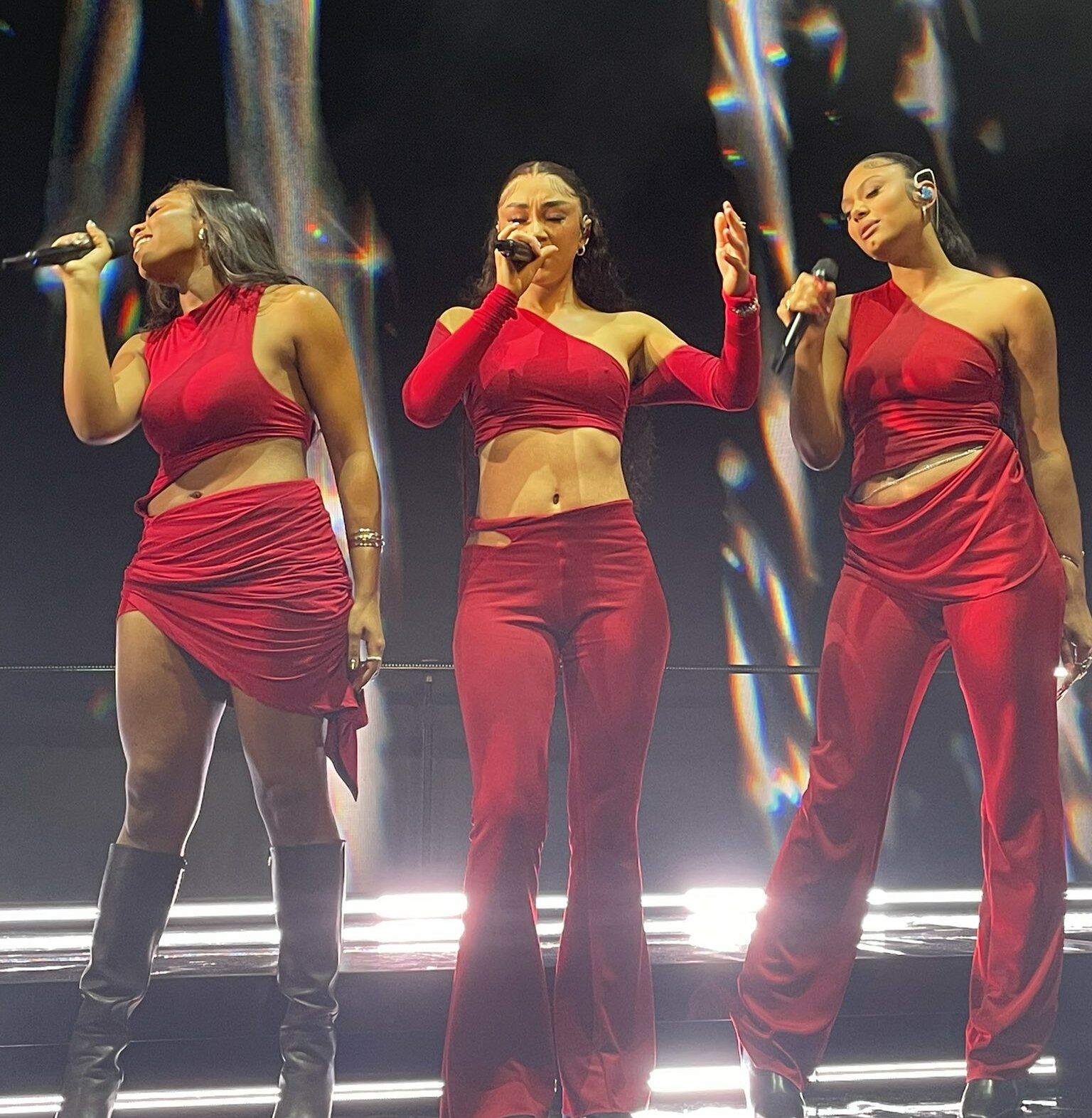
Flo performing live in London, England.

Poppie Platt of The Telegraph, gave it a four out of five-star review, describing the trio as "perfectly choreographed" and their harmonies as "flawless." In a three-star review for The Guardian, Sophie Walker commented that the concert "while this is their first tour, they perform as if it were a reflex: their melt-in-the-mouth harmonies are seemingly effortless; their languid choreography never misses a beat. They know the drill, perhaps all too."

Sophie Williams from NME, gave the first London show four out of five stars, stating that "this is FLO's chance, then, to truly stake their claim as R&B's newest, brightest hope." Giving it the maximum five stars, Lisa Wright from Evening Standard called the show a "masterful composite of nostalgia and talent that was clearly incredibly current."

== Shows ==
List of concerts, showing date, city, country, venue, and opening acts
Date	City	Country	Venue	Opening acts
Europe
30 March 2023	London	England	Here at Outernet	Natanya; Tiana Blake; Donnie Sunshine
3 April 2023	Manchester	England	New Century Hall	Natanya; Tiana Blake; Donnie Sunshine
North America
13 April 2023	Atlanta	United States	The Loft	Samaria
15 April 2023	Washington, D.C.	United States	9:30 Club	Samaria
16 April 2023	Philadelphia	United States	The Foundry	Samaria
18 April 2023	Toronto	Canada	The Opera House	Samaria
19 April 2023	New York City	United States	Webster Hall	Samaria
25 April 2023	Chicago	United States	Thalia Hall	Samaria
27 April 2023	Los Angeles	United States	The Fonda Theatre	Samaria
Europe
2 July 2023 (Note: Part of Longitude Festival)	Dublin	Ireland	Marlay Park	—N/a
8 July 2023 (Note: Part of Wireless Festival)	London	England	Finsbury Park	—N/a
Asia				—N/a
19 August 2023 (Note: This concert is part of the Summer Sonic Osaka)	Osaka	Japan	Maishima Sports Island	—N/a
20 August 2023 (Note: This concert is part of the Summer Sonic Tokyo)	Chiba	Japan	Zozo Marine Stadium	—N/a

== Cancelled shows ==
Date	City	Country	Venue	Reason
28 April 2023 (Note: Part of Something in the Water)	Virginia Beach	United States	Atlantic Avenue	Unforeseen conflict
30 April 2023 (Note: Part of Sol Blume Festival)	Sacramento	United States	Discovery Park	Weather conditions
7 July 2023 (Note: Part of TRNSMT)	Glasgow	Scotland	Glasgow Green	Unforeseen circumstances
14 October 2023 (Note: Part of Flavs Festival)	Jakarta	Indonesia	Gambir Expo	Unspecified

== Personnel ==
Band:

- Emmanuel Silvera – drums
- Steve Nti – bass
- Aleksey Lopez – guitar
- Jeffery Osei Asibey – keyboards
