= 3 of Us =

EP by Flo
- Released: 3 July 2023
- Genre: R&B
- Length: 11:43
- Label: Island
- Producer: MNEK; Jamal Woon; Gabriel Davies; RELYT; Joe Gosling; TSB; Gaetan Judd

Flo chronology
The Lead (2022)	3 of Us (2023)	Access All Areas (2024)

3 of Us is the second extended play by English girl group Flo. It was released on 3 July 2023 through Island Records. The project was surprise-released and includes the previously unreleased songs "Control Freak" and "Change".

== Background ==
On 30 March 2023, Flo embarked on tour in support of The Lead (2022). During the London concert of the Flo Live tour, they performed "Control Freak" for the first time. On 3 July, Flo announced the EP on their Instagram and made two previously unreleased tracks along with the title track on all streaming platforms.

A gift to the FLO Lifers who have been waiting so patiently for new music, we hope this will keep you fed whilst we finish off the album. Made with love.

— Flo about the EP,

On 7 July, Flo released a bonus track titled "Suite Life (Familiar)" featuring British singer Bellah.

== Track listing ==
Credits adapted from Genius.

3 of Us – Standard edition
No.	Title	Writer(s)	Producer(s)	Length
1.	"Control Freak"	Jamal Woon; Ryan Ashley; Renée Downer; Talay Riley; Uzoechi Emenike	MNEK; Woon; Gabriel Davies	3:00
2.	"Change"	Tyler Hotston; Ashley; Emenike; Joe Gosling; Aminata Kabba; Stella Quaresma; Downer; Jorja Douglas	MNEK; RELYT; Gosling	3:12
3.	"3 of Us"	Douglas; Emenike; Quaresma; Ikeoluwa Oluwatobi Oladigbolu	TSB; MNEK	2:56
Total length:				9:08

3 of Us – Reissue edition (bonus track)
No.	Title	Writer(s)	Producer(s)	Length
4.	"Suite Life (Familiar)" (featuring Bellah)	Isobel Akpobire; Gaetan Judd; Emenike; Hotston	RELYT; Gaetan Judd	2:34
Total length:				11:43

== Personnel ==
Credits adapted from Tidal.

=== Musicians ===
- Jorja Douglas – vocals (all tracks)
- Renée Downer – vocals (all tracks)
- Stella Quaresma – vocals (all tracks)
- Bellah – vocals (track 4)

=== Production ===
- MNEK – producer (tracks 1–3)
- Jamal Woon – producer (track 1)
- Gabriel Davies – producer (track 1)
- Joe Gosling – producer (track 2)
- RELYT – producer (tracks 2, 4)
- TSB – producer (track 3)
- Gaetan Judd – producer (track 4)

== Release history ==
Release dates and formats for 3 of Us
Region	Date	Format(s)	Edition(s)	Ref.
Various	3 July 2023	Digital download; streaming	Standard	
Various	7 July 2023	Digital download; streaming	Reissue	
