= Fly Girl (Flo song) =

2023 single by Flo featuring Missy Elliot

Single by Flo featuring Missy Elliott
- Released: 23 March 2023
- Genre: R&B; pop; hip hop
- Length: 3:25
- Label: UMG; Island
- Composers: Tre Jean-Marie; Uzoechi Emenike; Jamal Woon; Ryan Ashley; James Anderson; Rico Santana; Corte Ellis
- Lyricists: Jorja Douglas; Melissa Elliott; Stella Quaresma; Renée Downer; Camille Purcell
- Producers: LiTek; MNEK; WhyJay

Flo singles chronology
"Losing You" (2022)	"Fly Girl" (2023)	"Walk Like This" (2024)

Missy Elliott singles chronology
"Ratata" (2023)	"Fly Girl" (2023)	"Little Miss (Misdemeanor)" (2026)

Audio sample
- file; help

Music video
- "Fly Girl" on YouTube

"Fly Girl" is a song by British girl group Flo featuring American rapper Missy Elliott, released on 23 March 2023, through Island Records. The lyrics were co-written by the group members, Elliott, and Camille Purcell. The composers who participated in the song include Corte Ellis, James Anderson, Jamal Woon, Ryan Ashley, Tre Jean-Marie, and producers MNEK and WhyJay. It interpolates Elliott's 2002 single "Work It".

== Background and release ==
Flo first teased a collaboration with Missy Elliott in July 2022 in an interview with Complex, when asked about dream collaborations. On 14 March 2023, Flo posted a video through their social media featuring a sample of the song "Work It" alongside a pre-save link on Spotify and Apple Music respectively.

On 17 March 2023, a new snippet of the group's new song titled "Fly Girl" was presented, where Elliott's voice could be heard, further increasing the rumours. Flo officially announced the song and its release date of 21 March 2023, confirming the partnership with Missy Elliott. On 23 March 2023, the song was released along with a music video.

== Music video ==
The official music video was directed by former Beyoncé dancer Tajana Tokyo and was released along with the song on 23 March 2023. Stella, Renée and Jorja invite their Fly Girls to Flo's club party, where Missy Elliott makes an appearance.

The music video became the last music video to be played on the British music channel Trace Hits directly before its closure on 27 April 2023.

== Track listing ==
Digital download and streaming
No.	Title	Length
1.	"Fly Girl" (featuring Missy Elliott)	3:25

Digital download and streaming – Remixes
No.	Title	Length
1.	"Fly Girl" (Eliza Rose Remix)	3:29
2.	"Fly Girl" (Magicsticks Remix)	3:25
Total length:		6:54

== Credits and personnel ==
Credits adapted from Tidal.

- Jorja – principal vocalist, songwriting
- Renée – principal vocalist, songwriting
- Stella – principal vocalist, songwriting
- Missy Elliott – featured vocalist, songwriting
- MNEK – production, songwriting
- Joe Gosling – guitar, songwriting
- Tre Jean-Marie – record production, songwriting
- Jaycen Joshua – mixing engineering
- Matt Colton – mastering engineer

== Charts ==
Chart performance for "Fly Girl"
Chart (2023)	Peak position
Japan Hot Overseas (Billboard Japan)	7
New Zealand Hot Singles (RMNZ)	20
UK Singles (Official Charts)	38
UK Hip Hop/R&B (Official Charts)	18

== Accolades ==
Critics' rankings for "Fly Girl"
Publication	Accolade	Rank	Ref.
Billboard	The 50 Best Songs of 2023 So Far	28	
Cosmopolitan	The 20 Best Songs of 2023 So Far	9	
Esquire	The Best Summer Songs of 2023	14	
Seventeen	The 56 Best Songs of 2023 So Far	12	
Rolling Stone	The Best Songs of 2023 So Far	—N/a	

== Release history ==
Release formats for "Fly Girl"
Region	Date	Format	Label	Ref.
Various	23 March 2023	Digital download; streaming	Island	
