= In My Bag =

Single by Flo featuring GloRilla

from the album Access All Areas
- Released: 15 November 2024
- Genre: R&B; hip-hop; pop
- Length: 3:00
- Label: Island
- Songwriters: Albin Tengblad; Emma Rosen; Gloria Woods; Grant Boutin; Lara Anderson; Tayla Parx
- Producers: Albin Tengblad; Grant Boutin; MNEK; Styalz Fuego

Flo singles chronology
| "Check" (2024) | "In My Bag" (2024) | "On & On" (2025) |

GloRilla singles chronology
| "Sticky" (2024) | "In My Bag" (2024) | "Lay Down (Remix)" (2025) |

Music video
- "In My Bag" on YouTube

"In My Bag" is a song by British girl group Flo featuring American rapper GloRilla. It was released as part of their debut studio album, Access All Areas, on November 15, 2024, through Island Records.

== Composition ==
The song features a blend of R&B, hip-hop and pop, with Flo delivering vibrant vocals complemented by GloRilla's rap verses. The song's lyrics focus on themes of empowerment, self-confidence, and the celebration of personal achievements, aligning with Flo's narrative of growth and success.

== Music video ==
The music video for "In My Bag" was released on the same day as the album, November 15, 2024. It features a narrative where the three members of Flo are seen at a fancy gala. The twist at the end reveals that the thieves were impersonators, with the actual Flo members shown bound in the limo, suggesting a commentary on identity and fame.

== Live performances ==
Flo performed the song in a medley with "AAA (Access All Areas)" on the Graham Norton Show aired on BBC1 on December 13, 2024. Their also performed a medley of "In My Bag" with a christmas classic's "This Christmas" by Donny Hathaway at the BBC Radio 1's Christmas Live Lounge.

== Credits and personnel ==
Credits adapted from Tidal.

- Jorja – principal vocalist, songwriting
- Renée – principal vocalist, songwriting
- Stella – principal vocalist, songwriting
- GloRilla – featured vocalist, songwriting
- Tayla Parx - background vocalist, songwriting
- MNEK – production
- Grant Boutin - production, songwriting
- Albin Tengblad – guitar, keyboards, songwriting
- Alexander Lewis - trombone, horn arranger
- Kyla Moscovich - trumpet, horn arranger
- Serban Ghenea – mixing engineering
- Chris Gehringer – mastering engineer

== Charts ==
Chart performance for "In My Bag"
| Chart (2024) | Peak position |
|---|---|
| New Zealand Hot Singles (RMNZ) | 31 |

== Release history ==
Release formats for "in My Bag"
| Region | Date | Format | Label | Ref. |
|---|---|---|---|---|
| Various | November 15, 2024 | Digital download; streaming | Island | |
