= Jvck James =

English singer-songwriter

- Born: James Anderson; 23 November 1998 (age 27); London, England, UK
- Genres: R&B; soul
- Occupations: Singer; songwriter
- Instruments: Vocals
- Label: RCA
- Website: jvckjames.com

James Anderson (born 23 November 1998) better known as Jvck James, is a British singer and songwriter from London, England. After gaining attraction in his younger days posting viral videos on YouTube, his anticipated first single release in 2017 was met with a breakout performance for Colors Studio. James released his debut EP Detour in 2019, and the following year, signed a recording deal with RCA Records. His second EP Joyride was released in 2021, with the standout single "No Drama" being listed in Complex UK's "Best Songs of 2021". His third EP On the Rocks was released in 2022, in which he was also announced as Apple Music's Global Up Next Artist for that year.

== Early life ==
=== 1998–2017: Childhood ===
James Anderson was born and raised in East London, the youngest of his siblings. Brought up in a religious Jamaican family, he was exposed to gospel and reggae music from an early age which lead him to discover his love for R&B. Brandy, Destiny's Child, Michael Jackson and Kirk Franklin became James' childhood heroes, he was soon to discover D'Angelo, Erykah Badu and Lauryn Hill. Starting young singing at his grandmothers Pentecostal church he began to gain traction showing his talents on YouTube. His biggest cover was a tribute to the legend Whitney Houston singing "I Have Nothing". In 2012, uploads of James' covers eventually lead to him a role in the West End playing as young MJ for two years in the Thriller Live musical from just the age of twelve. After graduating from the BRIT School in 2015 and moving on to college ELAM (the East London Arts and Music college) (2015–2017) the JVCK JAMES moniker was born and stuck.

=== 2017–present: Career ===
Whilst still at college he released his first single "Extroverted Lovers" which met with a breakout performance for Colors live session in 2017. That, in turn, gathered even more pace, picking up more views, including Mahalia and Ella Mai who both invited him on tour with them across Europe and America. Following his debut project release Detour in 2019, James began his partnership with UK record label RCA in 2020. Later that year, he performed at the BET Soul Train Awards. Pre-Show and featured in their viral UK Soul Cypher

The following year James released his second EP Joyride, and described the collection of work as "R&B on steroids". Featuring six tracks including the singles "No Drama" and "Joyride (ándale)", the EP launched with a fully formed short film, which was created in conjunction of director Fenn O'Meally. The lead single "No Drama" was featured on Complex UK's "Best Songs of 2021".

In 2022, the single "Hennessy Tears" was released from James' most recent EP, On the Rocks, which was released in April. The release was accompanied with a recent co-sign from Apple Music who announced James as one of their Global Up Next Artists for 2022.

== Discography ==
=== Extended plays ===
List of extended plays, with selected details
Title	Details
Detour	Released: 4 October 2019; Label: Vibeout; Format: Digital download
Joyride	Released: 19 March 2021; Label: RCA; Format: Digital download
On the Rocks	Released: 27 April 2022; Label: RCA; Format: Digital download

=== Singles ===
==== As lead artist ====
List of singles as lead artist, showing year released and album name
Title	Year	Album
"Extroverted Lovers"	2017	Non-album singles
"Easy" (with Jada Maria)	2017	Non-album singles
"On My Way"	2018	Non-album singles
"Fears"	2018	Non-album singles
"Wine"	2018	Non-album singles
"Wave	2018	Non-album singles
"Fall Free"	2019	Non-album singles
"4AM"	2019	Detour
"Overseas"	2020	Non-album singles
"Favours"	2020	Non-album singles
"No Drama"	2021	Joyride
"Joyride (ándale)"	2021	Joyride
"Love in the Club"	2022	On the Rocks
"Hennessy Tears"	2022	On the Rocks
"Easier Done Than Said" (with Stormzy)	2025	TBA
