= Cardboard Box (song) =

Single by Flo

from the EP The Lead
- Released: 24 March 2022
- Genre: R&B; pop
- Length: 2:41
- Label: Island
- Songwriters: Uzoechi Emenike; Jorja Douglas; Renee Downer; Savannah Jada; Stella Quaresma
- Producer: MNEK

Flo singles chronology
"Cardboard Box" (2022)	"Immature" (2022)

Music video
- "Cardboard Box" on YouTube

Happi remix cover

Happi singles chronology
"Jireh (My Provider)" (2022)	"Cardboard Box (Remix)" (2022)	"Terms and Conditions (Remix)" (2023)

Lyric video
- "Cardboard Box" (Happi Remix) on YouTube

"Cardboard Box" is the debut single by British girl group Flo from their debut EP, The Lead (2022). The group co-wrote the song alongside Savannah Jada and MNEK, the latter of whom also handled the song's production. The single was released for digital download and streaming through Island Records on 24 March 2022 as the lead single from the EP. A pop and R&B song, it features the group's harmonised vocals over a dancehall-inspired beat with elements of 2000s music. Lyrically, the song describes moving on from an unfaithful romantic partner. Upon its release, the song gained popularity through Instagram, Twitter and TikTok.

== Background ==
After their formation in 2019, the group spent two years working on music with producers including MNEK. "Cardboard Box" was one of the first songs worked on during these sessions. The single was subsequently released on 24 March 2022. An accompanying music video was published to YouTube on 1 April 2022, which surpassed 900 thousand views within days. A Tweet containing a clip from the music video also attracted over 2 million views and 100 thousand likes on Twitter.

The single has been praised on social media by established artists including SZA, Missy Elliott, JoJo, and Victoria Monét.

"Cardboard Box" was featured as the lead single for their debut extended play, The Lead (2022). An acoustic version of the song was released to YouTube and streaming services on 27 May 2022. The group also performed the single for Vevo DSCVR, alongside the second single from The Lead, "Immature". The group made their television debut on 7 October 2022, performing the single on US talk show Jimmy Kimmel Live!

In August 2022, "Cardboard Box" started gaining popularity on the platform TikTok after an afrobeats version emerged, starting a new trend on the video-sharing app. The group officially released DJ Happi's remix as a single and premiered a lyric video on 6 October 2022.

== Track listings ==
- Streaming/digital download – remix
1. "Cardboard Box" (Happi Remix) – 2:30
2. "Cardboard Box" – 2:41
- Streaming/digital download – versions
1. "Cardboard Box" (Sped Up) – 2:18
2. "Cardboard Box" (Acoustic) – 2:53
3. "Cardboard Box" (Studio Vocals) – 2:41
4. "Cardboard Box" (Instrumental) – 2:41

== Accolades ==
Accolades for Cardboard Box
Publication	Accolade	Rank
Apple Music	Apple Music's 100 Best Songs of 2022	7
Amazon Music	Amazon Music's 50 Best Songs of 2022	40
Complex UK	Complex UK's 50 Best Songs of 2022	4
Esquire	Esquire's 45 Best Songs of 2022	12
PopBuzz	PopBuzz's 20 Best Songs of 2022	19
The Guardian	Guardian's 20 Best Songs of 2022	20
NME	NME's 50 Best Songs of 2022	32
Billboard	Billboard's 100 Best Songs of 2022	85
The Fader	Fader's 100 Best Songs of 2022	99

== Charts ==
Chart performance for "Cardboard Box"
Chart (2022–2023)	Peak position
Japan Hot Overseas (Billboard Japan)	17
New Zealand Hot Singles (RMNZ)	19
UK Singles (OCC)	76

== Certifications ==
Certifications for "Cardboard Box"
Region	Certification	Certified units/sales
New Zealand (RMNZ)	Gold	15,000^{‡}
United Kingdom (BPI)	Silver	200,000^{‡}
^{‡} Sales+streaming figures based on certification alone.

== Release history ==
Release dates and formats for Cardboard Box
Region	Date	Format(s)	Version	Label	Ref.
Various	24 March 2022	streaming; digital download	Original	Island	
Various	27 May 2022	streaming; digital download	Acoustic	Island	
Various	7 October 2022	streaming; digital download	Happi remix	Island	
