= The Lead (EP) =

2022 extended play

EP by Flo
- Released: 8 July 2022
- Genre: R&B
- Length: 14:27
- Label: Island
- Producers: Uzoechi Emenike; Tre Jean-Marie; Joe Gossling; Joe Hartwell Jones; Jamal Woon; LOXE; Maths Time Joy; RELYT

Flo chronology
The Lead (2022)	3 of Us (2023)

Singles from The Lead
- 1. "Cardboard Box" Released: 24 March 2022; 2. "Immature" Released: 6 July 2022

The Lead is the debut extended play by English girl group Flo. It was released on 8 July 2022, through Island Records. It was preceded by two singles: "Cardboard Box" and "Immature".

The debut extended play was produced by MNEK, except "Another Guy (Acoustic)". On 14 September 2022, the English trio re-released the extended play on digital platforms, adding a new track "Not My Job", which also served as a promotional single.

== Background ==
"Cardboard Box" was first released on 24 March 2022, by the English trio and acted as the trio's debut single. Later on, this single also acted as the lead single for their extended play. The debut song was produced by English producer MNEK. An accompanying music video was published to YouTube on 1 April 2022, which surpassed 900 thousand views within days. Many established artists, such as SZA and Missy Elliott praised the song on social media. The trio described the song as "getting yourself together after a breakup". On 6 May 2022, an acoustic version of this single was released.

"Immature" acted as their second single which was released on 6 July 2022. Pitchfork described the trio's vocals as "an icy edge, while the trio's golden harmonies at the bridge keep things crisp." A music video for this single was released on the same day as the EP. The trio performed both singles live for Vevo DSCVR on 5 August 2022.

The same day where their second was released, the English trio announced their debut extended play. The extended play was released on 8 July 2022, with a total of five tracks. MNEK produced four out of the five songs featured in the EP. In September 2022, the trio re-released the extended play with an additional track, named "Not My Job", which was released as a promotional single.

== Critical reception ==
The EP received widespread acclaim from critics. Complex called it "an essential listen". with Nylon making a similar assessment. Rolling Stone predicted that the EP would vault Flo to stardom. MuuMuse noted that the EP displays the confidence and authority of a long-establish star act, despite being Flo's first full release. The EP also received positive reviews from The Honey Pop, 360, and Soul Bounce.

== Track listing ==
Credits adapted from Tidal and Genius.

Standard edition
No.	Title	Writer(s)	Producer(s)	Length
1.	"Cardboard Box"	Uzoechi Emenike; Stella Quaresma; Savannah Jada; Renée Downer; Jorja Douglas	MNEK	2:41
2.	"Immature"	Aminata Kabba; Emenike; Ryan Ashley; Jamal Woon	Woon; MNEK^{[a]}	2:53
3.	"Summertime"	Emenike; Kabba; Woon; Rashaan Brown; Tyler Hotston	MNEK; Woon; RELYT; Joe Gosling	2:28
4.	"Feature Me"	Douglas; Downer; Quaresma; Kabba; Woon; Hannah Yadi; Timothy James Worthington; Rowan Perkins	Maths Time Joy; LOXE; MNEK^{[a]}	3:22
5.	"Another Guy" (Acoustic)	Aston Rudi; Brown; Quaresma; Downer; Douglas	Joe Hartwell Jones; Joshua Alamu^{[b]}	3:03
Total length:				14:27

Vinyl edition (bonus track)
No.	Title	Writer(s)	Producer(s)	Length
6.	"Cardboard Box" (Acoustic)	Emenike; Quaresma; Jada; Downer; Douglas	MNEK	2:41
Total length:				17:17

Digital reissue edition (bonus track)
No.	Title	Writer(s)	Producer(s)	Length
1.	"Cardboard Box"	Emenike; Quaresma; Jada; Downer; Douglas	MNEK	2:41
2.	"Immature"	Kabba; Emenike; Ashley; Woon	Woon; MNEK^{[a]}	2:53
3.	"Not My Job"	Talay Riley; Emenike; Dayo Olatunji; Quaresma; Tre Jean-Marie; Downer; Douglas	Jean-Marie; MNEK^{[a]}	2:54
4.	"Summertime"	Emenike; Kabba; Woon; Brown; Hotston	MNEK; Woon; RELYT; Gosling	2:28
5.	"Feature Me"	Douglas; Downer; Quaresma; Kabba; Woon; Yadi; Worthington; Perkins	Maths Time Joy; LOXE; MNEK^{[a]}	3:22
6.	"Another Guy" (Acoustic)	Rudi; Brown; Quaresma; Downer; Douglas	Jones; Alamu^{[b]}	3:03
Total length:				17:21

Notes:

- ^{^[a]} signifies an additional producer
- ^{^[b]} signifies a co-producer

== Personnel ==
Credits adapted from Genius.

=== Musicians ===
- Jorja Douglas – vocals (all tracks)
- Renée Downer – vocals (all tracks)
- Stella Quaresma – vocals (all tracks)

=== Production ===
- Uzoechi Emenike – producer (tracks 1–4)
- Jamal Woon – producer (tracks 2–3)
- Joe Gossling – producer (track 3)
- RELYT – producer (track 3)
- Maths Time Joy – producer (track 4)
- LOXE – producer (track 4)
- Joe Hartwell Jones – producer (track 5)
- Tre Jean-Marie – producer (track 3 (Apple Music Up Next edition))

== Release history ==
Release dates and formats for The Lead
Region	Date	Format(s)	Edition	Label	Ref.
Various	8 July 2022	Digital download; streaming	Standard	Island	
Various	14 September 2022	Digital download; streaming	Deluxe	Island	
Various	9 December 2022	Vinyl LP	Standard	Island	
