= Ola (given name) =

Ola (Arabic: علا) is an Arabic feminine given name that means "surmount", "high", and "arise". It is also a common shorthand name in Norway and Sweden (as a variant of Olaf), and in Polish it is a diminutive form of feminine given names Olga and Aleksandra.

Moreover, Ọlá in West African Yorùbá language is a popular unisex name, and is a root morpheme for other popular Yorùbá given names and surnames like Olaoluwa, Olabisi, Oladapo, Oladele, Olajide, Olamide, Olaoye, Olatunji, Olawale, Olayemi, Olayinka etc.

== Men ==
- Ola (born 1987), English comedian
- Ola Adeyemo (born 1995), Nigerian footballer
- Ola Afolabi (born 1980), British boxer, former cruiserweight champion
- Ola Aina (born 1996), English footballer
- Ola Backman (1928–2016), Swedish Navy rear admiral
- Ola Englund (born 1981), Swedish guitarist for Feared, The Haunted and formerly of Six Feet Under (band)
- Ola Gjeilo (born 1978), Norwegian composer and pianist
- Ola Håkansson (born 1945), Swedish singer, composer and producer
- Ola Hanson (1864–1927), Swedish-American missionary in Burma
- Ola Isene (1898–1973), Norwegian singer and actor
- Ola John (born 1992), Liberian-Dutch footballer
- Ola Kamara (born 1989), Nigerian footballer in Major League Soccer
- Ola Kimrin (born 1972), former National Football League placekicker
- Ola L. Mize (1931–2014), United States Army officer awarded the Medal of Honor
- Ola Borten Moe (born 1976), Norwegian politician
- Ola Möller (born 1983), Swedish politician
- Ola Otnes (born 1951), Norwegian actor
- Ola Rapace (born 1971), Swedish actor
- Ola Rotimi (1938–2000), Nigerian playwright and theatre director
- Ola Salo (born 1977), Swedish singer
- Ola Svensson (born 1986), Swedish singer, better known by his mononym Ola
- Ola Toivonen (born 1986), Swedish footballer
- Ola Ullsten (1931–2018), Swedish politician and diplomat, Prime Minister of Sweden
- Ola Wærhaug (1937–2025), Norwegian biathlete
- Ola Wong (born 1977), Swedish author, journalist and sinologist

== Women ==
- Ola Al-Fares (born 1985), Jordanian lawyer, journalist and television presenter
- Ola S. Apeland (born 1964), Norwegian politician
- Ola Babcock Miller (1871–1937), American politician
- Ola Ince, British theatre director
- Ola Jordan (born 1982), Polish dancer
- Ola Orekunrin (born 1986), British-Nigerian medical doctor and managing director of the charity Flying Doctors Nigeria
- Ola Ray (born 1960), American model and actress
- Ola Belle Reed (1916–2002), American folk singer
- Ola Mildred Rexroat (1917–2017), American aviator
- Ola Teigen (1937–1970), Norwegian politician
- Ola Uduku, British African architect

== Folk figures ==
- Ola Värmlänning, a drunken prankster in Swedish-American folklore

== See also ==
- Ola (disambiguation)
- Ola (surname)
- Ole (name)
