= Ola (surname) =

Ola is a surname. Moreover, Ọlá in West African Yoruba language is a popular root morpheme for other popular Yorùbá given names or surnames like Olabisi, Oladapo, Oladele, Olajide, Olamide, Olaoye, Olatunji, Olawale, Olayemi, Olayinka etc.

But people with the name or surname Ola include:

- Daniel Ola (born 1982), Ghanaian-Nigerian footballer
- Michael Ola (born 1988), American football player
- Simeón Ola (1865–1952), Filipino general who fought in the Philippine Revolution

== See also ==
- Ola (given name)
- Ola (disambiguation)
