= List of awards and nominations received by Stormzy =

Stormzy awards and nominations
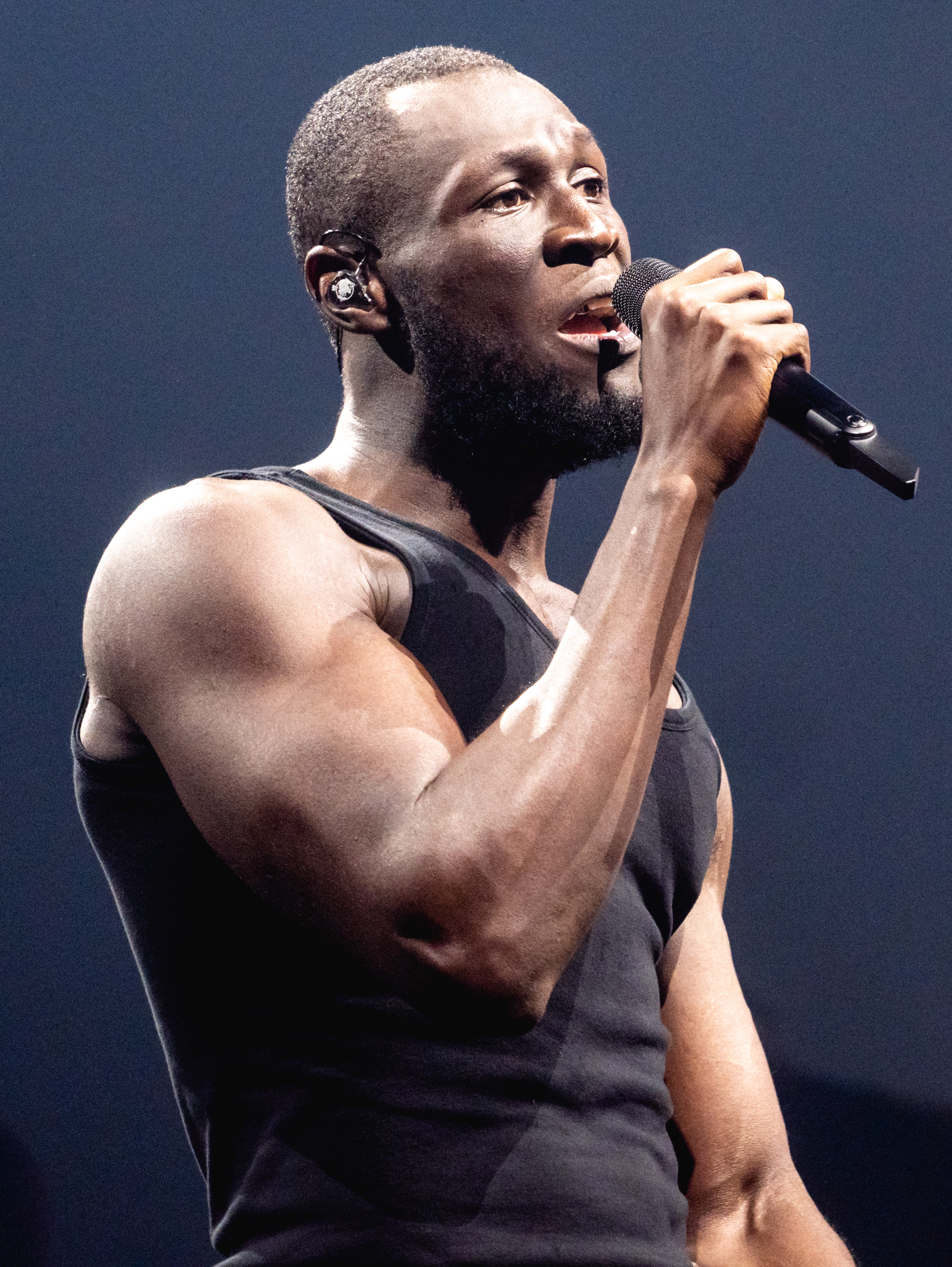
- Stormzy in 2022
Awards and nominations
Award	Wins	Nominations
AIM Independent Music Awards	4	6
BET Awards	2	5
BET Hip Hop Awards	1	1
Brit Awards	4	11
Global Awards	3	9
Ivor Novello Awards	1	4
MTV Europe Music Awards	1	5
MOBO Awards	7	19
NME Awards	1	2
Silver Clef Awards	1	3
UK Music Video Awards	2	8

Totals (Note: Certain award groups do not simply award one winner. They acknowledge several different recipients, have runners-up, and have third place. Since this is a specific recognition and is different from losing an award, runner-up mentions are considered wins in this award tally. For simplification and to avoid errors, each award in this list has been presumed to have had a prior nomination.)
- Wins: 36
- Nominations: 93

This is a list of awards and nominations received by Stormzy, a British rapper, singer and songwriter. Three times BRIT Awards winner, he was recognised with the AIM Independent Music Diversity Champion Award and the 2023 Silver Clef Award for his outstanding contributions in the British music industry.

After his solo debut single "Know Me From", Stormzy won three MOBO Awards and the BET Awards for Best International Act. In 2017, he won his first MTV Europe Music Award for Best Worldwide Act and was nominated for British Breakthrough Act at the 2017 BRIT Awards.

In 2018, his debut album Gang Signs & Prayer became the first rap album to win the BRIT Award for British Album of the Year; at the same award ceremony, he won the British Male Solo Artist Award. The album also won an Ivor Novello Award and an AIM Independent Music Award, and was nominated for a Mercury Prize. The same year, he collaborated on Little Mix's song "Power", winning two Global Awards.

His second studio album Heavy Is the Head (2019) was promoted by the single "Vossi Bop", which won two UK Music Video Awards. At the 2020 BRIT Awards, the song was nominated for British Song of the Year, while Stormzy won for the second time the British Male Solo Artist Award. The same year, he won his first BET Hip Hop Award. In 2022, he published his third studio album This is What I Mean, receiving nominations at the BRIT Awards and MOBO Awards. The accompanying music video of the single "Mel Made Me Do It" won the MOBO Award for Best Music Video, and received a nomination at the UK Music Video Awards and MTV Europe Music Awards for Best Longform Video.

== Awards and nominations ==
Award	Year	Work	Category	Result	Ref.
AIM Independent Music Awards	2016	Himself	Independent Breakthrough of the Year	Nominated	
AIM Independent Music Awards	2016	Himself	Innovator Award	Won	
AIM Independent Music Awards	2017	Himself	Most Played New Independent Act	Won	
AIM Independent Music Awards	2017	Gang Signs & Prayer	Independent Album of the Year	Won	
AIM Independent Music Awards	2017	"Big for Your Boots"	Independent Track of the Year	Nominated	
AIM Independent Music Awards	2022	Himself	Diversity Champion Award	Won	
BBC Music Awards	2017	Himself	Artist of the Year	Won	
BBC Music Awards	2017	Gang Signs & Prayer	Album of the Year	Nominated	
Berlin Music Video Awards	2020	"Sounds of the Skeng"	Best Editor	Nominated	
BET Awards	2015	Himself	Best International Act: UK	Won	
BET Awards	2016	Himself	Best International Act: UK	Nominated	
BET Awards	2017	Himself	Best International Act: Europe	Won	
BET Awards	2018	Himself	Best International Act	Nominated	
BET Awards	2020	Himself	Best International Act	Nominated	
BET Awards	2023	Himself	Best International Act	Nominated	
BET Hip Hop Awards	2020	Himself	Best International Flow	Won	
BRIT Awards	2017	Himself	British Breakthrough Act	Nominated	
BRIT Awards	2018	Himself	British Male Solo Artist	Won	
BRIT Awards	2018	Gang Signs & Prayer	British Album of the Year	Won	
BRIT Awards	2020	Himself	British Male Solo Artist	Won	
BRIT Awards	2020	"Vossi Bop"	British Song of the Year	Nominated	
BRIT Awards	2023	Himself	British Artist of the Year	Nominated	
BRIT Awards	2023	Himself	Best Hip Hop/Grime/Rap Act	Nominated	
BRIT Awards	2023	This Is What I Mean	British Album of the Year	Nominated	
BRIT Awards	2025	Himself	Best Hip Hop/Grime/Rap Act	Won	
BRIT Awards	2025	"Backbone" (with Chase & Status)	British Song of the Year	Nominated	
Electronic Dance Music Awards	2025	"Backbone" (with Chase & Status)	Drum and Bass Song of the Year	Nominated	
Global Awards	2018	"Power" (with Little Mix)	Best Song	Won	
Global Awards	2018	Himself	Best RnB, Hip Hop or Grime	Won	
Global Awards	2020	Himself	Best Male	Nominated	
Global Awards	2020	Himself	Best RnB, Hip Hop or Grime	Won	
Global Awards	2020	Himself	Best British Act	Nominated	
Global Awards	2023	Himself	Best Male	Nominated	
Global Awards	2023	Himself	Best RnB, Hip Hop or Grime	Nominated	
Global Awards	2023	Himself	Best British Act	Nominated	
Global Awards	2024	Himself	Best Male	Nominated	
GQ Men of the Year Awards	2017	Himself	Solo Artist of the Year	Won	
GQ Men of the Year Awards	2019	Himself	Solo Artist of the Year	Won	
Ivor Novello Awards	2018	"Don’t Cry For Me"	Best Contemporary Song	Nominated	
Ivor Novello Awards	2018	Gang Signs & Prayer	Album Award	Won	
Ivor Novello Awards	2020	"Crown"	Best Song Musically and Lyrically	Nominated	
Ivor Novello Awards	2023	"Hide & Seek"	Best Contemporary Song	Nominated	
Mercury Prize	2017	Gang Signs & Prayer	Album of the Year	Nominated	
MOBO Awards	2014	Himself	Best Grime	Won	
MOBO Awards	2015	Himself	Best Grime	Won	
MOBO Awards	2015	Himself	Best Male	Won	
MOBO Awards	2015	"Know Me From"	Best Video	Nominated	
MOBO Awards	2016	Himself	Best Male	Nominated	
MOBO Awards	2016	Himself	Best Grime	Nominated	
MOBO Awards	2017	Himself	Best Grime	Won	
MOBO Awards	2017	Himself	Best Male	Won	
MOBO Awards	2017	Gang Signs & Prayer	Best Album	Won	
MOBO Awards	2017	"Big for Your Boots"	Best Video	Nominated	
MOBO Awards	2017	"Big for Your Boots"	Best Song	Nominated	
MOBO Awards	2020	Himself	Best Male	Nominated	
MOBO Awards	2020	Heavy Is the Head	Best Album	Nominated	
MOBO Awards	2020	"I Dunno" (with Tion Wayne & Dutchavelli)	Song of the Year	Nominated	
MOBO Awards	2021	"Clash"	Song of the Year	Nominated	
MOBO Awards	2023	Himself	Best Male	Nominated	
MOBO Awards	2023	This is What I Mean	Best Album	Nominated	
MOBO Awards	2023	"Hide & Seek" (with Dave)	Song of the Year	Nominated	
MOBO Awards	2023	"Mel Made Me Do It"	Video of the Year	Won	
MOBO Awards	2025	"Backbone"	Song of the Year	Nominated	
MTV Europe Music Awards	2017	Himself	Best Worldwide Act	Won	
MTV Europe Music Awards	2017	Himself	Best UK & Ireland Act	Nominated	
MTV Europe Music Awards	2018	Himself	Best UK & Ireland Act	Nominated	
MTV Europe Music Awards	2020	Himself	Best UK & Ireland Act	Nominated	
MTV Europe Music Awards	2022	"Mel Made Me Do It"	Best Longform Video	Nominated	
NME Awards	2018	Himself	Best British Solo Artist	Nominated	
NME Awards	2018	Himself	Best Live Artist	Nominated	
NME Awards	2020	Himself	Best Festival Headliner	Nominated	
NME Awards	2020	"Vossi Bop"	Best Music Video	Nominated	
Q Awards	2017	Gang Signs & Prayer	Best Album	Nominated	
Q Awards	2017	Himself	Best Live Act	Nominated	
Q Awards	2017	Himself	Best Solo Artist	Won	
Q Awards	2019	Himself	Best Solo Artist	Won	
Q Awards	2019	"Vossi Bop"	Best Track	Nominated	
Q Awards	2019	Stormzy - Glastonbury	Best Live Performance	Nominated	
Rated Awards	2015	"Know Me From"	Best Track	Nominated	
Rated Awards	2015	"Know Me From"	Best Video	Won	
Rated Awards	2015	Himself	Artist of the Year	Nominated	
Rated Awards	2016	Himself	Artist of the Year	Nominated	
Rated Awards	2017	Himself	Artist of the Year	Won	
Rated Awards	2017	"Big for Your Boots"	Best Video	Won	
Rated Awards	2017	"Big for Your Boots"	Best Track	Nominated	
Rated Awards	2017	Gang Signs & Prayer	Best Album	Nominated	
Silver Clef Award	2017	Himself	Best Live Act	Nominated	
Silver Clef Award	2018	Himself	Best Live Act	Nominated	
Silver Clef Award	2023	Himself	Silver Clef Award	Won	
South Bank Sky Arts Award	2016	Himself	The Times Breakthrough Award	Won	
South Bank Sky Arts Award	2018	Gang Signs & Prayer	Best Pop Album	Won	
UK Music Video Awards	2018	Gang Signs & Prayer	Best Urban Video	Nominated	
UK Music Video Awards	2019	"Vossi Bop"	Best Urban Video	Won	
UK Music Video Awards	2019	"Vossi Bop"	Video of the Year	Won	
UK Music Video Awards	2019	"Vossi Bop"	Best Cinematography	Nominated	
UK Music Video Awards	2020	"Audacity" (with Headie One)	Best Hip Hop/Grime/Rap Video - UK	Nominated	
UK Music Video Awards	2023	"The Weekend" (with Raye)	Best R&B/Soul Video – UK	Nominated	
UK Music Video Awards	2023	"Mel Made Me Do It"	Best Hip Hop/Grime/Rap Video – UK	Nominated	
UK Music Video Awards	2023	"Toxic Trait" (with Fredo)	Best Visual Effects in a Video	Nominated	
