= List of awards and nominations received by Stereophonics =

Stereophonics awards and nominations
Awards and nominations
Award	Wins	Nominations
Brit	1	5
MTV Europe	0	1
NME	0	0
Q	2	9
Kerrang! Awards	3	4
POP Factory Awards	2	2
Sliver Clef Awards	1	1
Meteor Music Awards	1	1

Totals (Note: Certain award groups do not simply award one winner. They acknowledge several different recipients, have runners-up, and have third place. Since this is a specific recognition and is different from losing an award, runner-up mentions are considered wins in this award tally. For simplification and to avoid errors, each award in this list has been presumed to have had a prior nomination.)
- Wins: 10
- Nominations: 23

== BT Digital Music Awards ==
Launched in 2002, the BT Digital Music Awards were held annually in the United Kingdom.

Year	Nominee / work	Award	Result
2005	Stereophonics	Best Rock Artist	Won
2007	Stereophonics' Bank Holiday Monday Ticket/Download Promotion	Best Artist Promotion	Nominated

== BRIT Awards ==
The BRIT Awards are the British Phonographic Industry's annual pop music awards. Stereophonics have received one awards from 5 nominations.

Year	Nominee / work	Award	Result
1998	Stereophonics	British Breakthrough Act	Won
2000	Stereophonics	Best British Group	Nominated
2000	Performance & Cocktails	Best British Album	Nominated
2002	Stereophonics	Best British Group	Nominated
2004	Stereophonics	Best British Rock Act	Nominated

== Global Awards ==
The Global Awards are held by Global to honor music played on British radio stations.

Year	Nominee / work	Award	Result
2019	Stereophonics	Best Group	Nominated
2019	Stereophonics	Best Indie	Nominated
2020	Stereophonics	Best Indie	Won
2020	Stereophonics	The Global Special Award	Won
2020	Stereophonics	Best Group	Nominated
2022	Stereophonics	Best Indie	Nominated

== Kerrang! Awards ==
The Kerrang! Awards is an annual music awards show in the United Kingdom, founded by the music magazine, Kerrang! and focusing primarily on rock music.

Year	Nominee / work	Award	Result
1999	Performance and Cocktails	Best Album	Won
1999	Stereophonics	Best British Band	Won
2000	Stereophonics	Best British Band	Won
2003	Stereophonics	Best British Band	Nominated
2005	Stereophonics	Best British Band	Nominated

== Meteor Music Awards ==
A Meteor Ireland Music Award was an accolade bestowed upon professionals in the music industry in Ireland and further afield.

Year	Nominee / work	Award	Result
2002	Stereophonics	Best International Group	Won

== MTV Europe Music Awards ==
The MTV Europe Music Awards were established in 1994 by MTV Europe to celebrate the most popular music videos in Europe. Stereophonics have received one nomination.

Year	Nominee / work	Award	Result
2005	Stereophonics	Best UK & Ireland Act	Nominated

== Mercury Prize ==
The Mercury Prize, formerly the Mercury Music Prize, is an annual music prize awarded for the best album from the United Kingdom or Ireland.

Year	Nominee / work	Award	Result
1999	Performance and Cocktails	Album of the Year	Nominated

== NME Awards ==
The NME Awards were created by the NME magazine and was first held in 1953.

Year	Nominee / work	Award	Result
1998	Stereophonics	Best New Act	Nominated
1999	Word Gets Around	Best Album	Nominated
1999	"Local Boy in the Photograph"	Best Single	Nominated
1999	Stereophonics	Best Band	Nominated
2000	Stereophonics	Best Band	Nominated
2000	Performance and Cocktails	Best Album	Nominated

== Q Awards ==
The Q Awards are hosted annually by the music magazine Q.

Year	Nominee / work	Award	Result
1999	Performance and Cocktails	Best Album	Nominated
1999	Stereophonics	Best Live Act	Won
1999	Stereophonics	Best Act in the World Today	Nominated
2000	Stereophonics	Best Act in the World Today	Nominated
2001	Stereophonics	Best Act in the World Today	Nominated
2001	Stereophonics	Best Live Act	Nominated
2001	Just Enough Education to Perform	Best Album	Nominated
2001	"Have a Nice Day"	Best Single	Nominated
2002	Themselves	Best Act in the World Today	Nominated
2007	"Local Boy in the Photograph"	Classic Song	Won

== Silver Clef Award ==
The Silver Clef Award is an annual UK music awards lunch which has been running since 1976.

Year	Nominee / work	Award	Result
2009	Stereophonics	Best British Act Award	Won
2018	Stereophonics	Icon Award	Won

== Smash Hits Poll Winners Party ==
The Smash Hits Poll Winners Party was an awards ceremony which ran from 1988 to 2005. Each award winner was voted by readers of the Smash Hits magazine.

Year	Nominee / work	Award	Result
1999	Stereophonics	Best Indie/Rock Act	Won
2000	Stereophonics	Best Indie/Rock Act	Nominated
2002	Stereophonics	Best Indie/Rock Act	Nominated

== Top of the Pops Awards ==
The Top of the Pops Awards were awarded annually by television programme Top of the Pops.

Year	Nominee / work	Award	Result
2001	Themselves	Best Rock Act	Nominated
