= Ola =

Ola may refer to:

== Places ==
=== Panama ===
- Olá, a subdistrict in Coclé Province
- Olá District

=== Russia ===
- Ola, Russia, an urban settlement in Magadan Oblast
- Ola District, an administrative division in Magadan Oblast
- Ola (river), a river in Magadan Oblast

=== United States ===
- Ola, Arkansas, a city
- Ola, Georgia, an unincorporated community
- Ola, Idaho, an unincorporated community
- Ola, Nevada, a ghost town
- Ola, South Dakota, a census-designated place
- Ola, Kaufman County, Texas, an unincorporated community
- Casa Linda Estates, Dallas, formerly known as Ola

== People ==
- Ola (given name), a list of men and women with the name
- Ola (surname), a list of men and women with the surname
- Ola Svensson (born 1986), also known by the mononym Ola, Swedish singer-songwriter
- Ola Nordmann, a national personification of Norwegians
- Ola people, another name for the Wurla, an indigenous people of Western Australia

== Other uses ==
- Ola High School (disambiguation), the name of several high schools
- Our Lady's Abingdon, a private Catholic school in Oxfordshire, England
- Ola Consumer, an Indian online cab aggregator
- Ola Electric, an Indian electric scooter manufacturer
- Ola (also Olá), an ice cream brand owned by The Magnum Ice Cream Company
- Ola, former name of Colombia Móvil mobile phone company
- Ola (album), by Ola Svensson (2010)
- Ola, an audience wave
- Ola station, a railway station in the Basque Country, Spain
- Ola, a synonym for the fly genus Rutilotrixa
- Oromo Liberation Army, an armed opposition group active in the Oromia Region of Ethiopia

== See also ==
- Olaf (disambiguation)
- Oola (disambiguation)
- Aulakh
