= List of awards and nominations received by Flo =

FLO awards and nominations
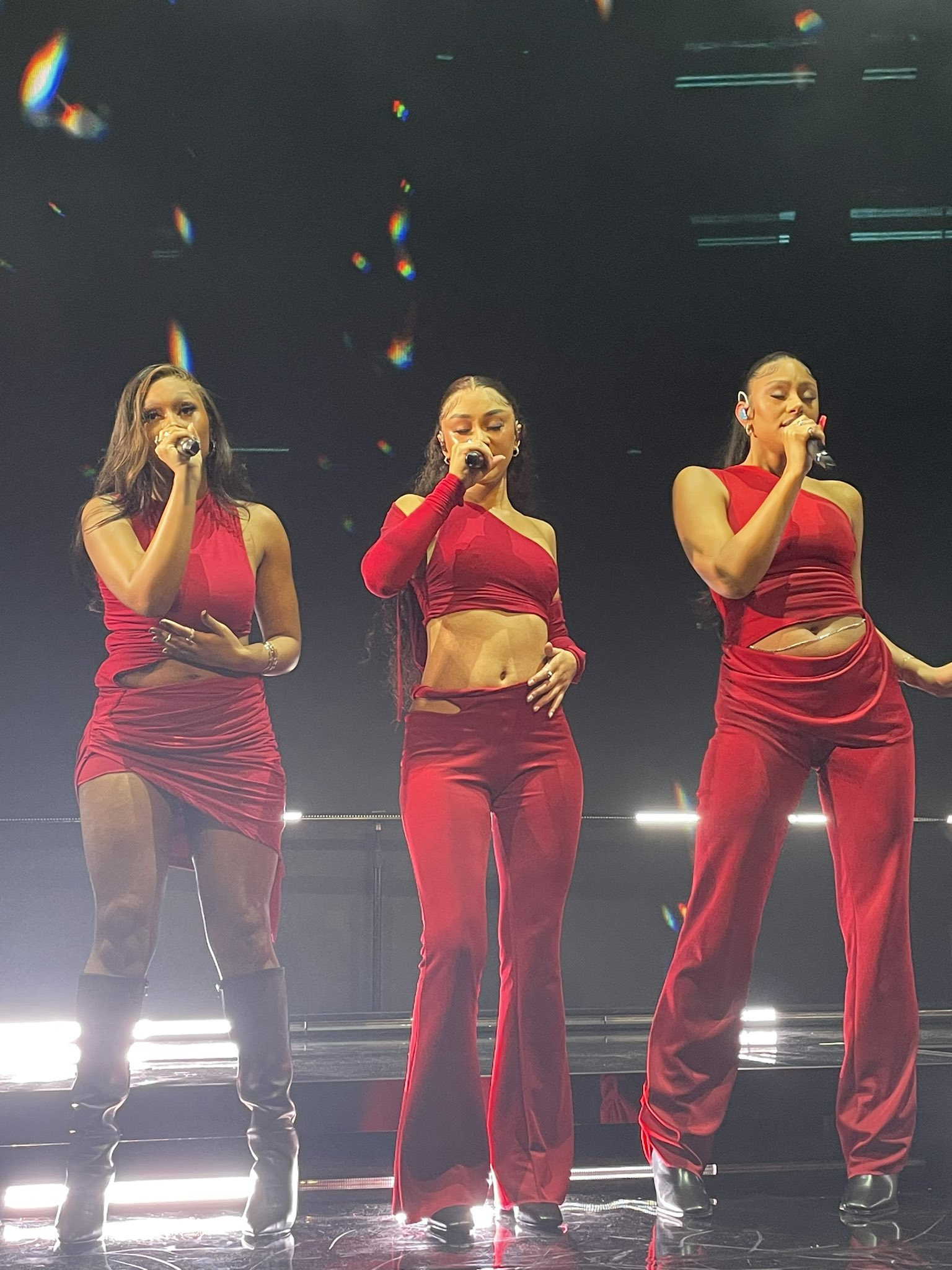
- FLO performing live in London
Awards and nominations
Award	Wins	Nominations
BBC Sound of...	1	1
BET Awards	0	8
Brit Awards	1	2
Deezer Awards	1	1
Global Awards	1	2
Grammy Awards	0	1
MOBO Awards	1	4
MTV Europe Music Awards	0	3
MTV Video Music Awards	0	3
NAACP Image Awards	0	3
Popjustice Twenty Quid Prize	0	1
Rated Awards	0	1
Soul Train Music Awards	0	3
Urban Music Awards	0	5

Totals (Note: Certain award groups do not simply award one winner. They acknowledge several different recipients, have runners-up, and have third place. Since this is a specific recognition and is different from losing an award, runner-up mentions are considered wins in this award tally. For simplification and to avoid errors, each award in this list has been presumed to have had a prior nomination.)
- Wins: 7
- Nominations: 39

FLO is a British girl group, consisting of members Stella Quaresma, Jorja Douglas, and Renée Downer. Throughout their career, they have received various awards and nominations, including the Brit Awards and Global Awards, and have been nominated for one Grammy Award, three Soul Train Music Awards and seven BET Awards.

== BBC Sound of... ==
The BBC Sound of... an annual survey conducted by the BBC to identify the most promising new music talent. It polls a wide range of music critics, broadcasters, and industry insiders. FLO has received one award.

Year	Nominee / work	Award	Result	Ref.
2023	Themselves	Sound of 2023	Won	

== BET Awards ==
The BET Awards are presented annually by the Black Entertainment Television Network (BET) to celebrate African Americans and other minorities in music, acting, sports, and other entertainment fields. FLO has been nominated seven times.

Year	Nominee / work	Award	Result	Ref.
2023	Themselves	Best Group	Nominated	
2023	Themselves	Best New Artist	Nominated	
2023	Themselves	Best New International Act	Nominated	
2024	Themselves	Best Group	Nominated	
2024	"Fly Girl" (with Missy Elliott)	BET Her	Nominated	
2025	"In My Bag" (with GloRilla)	BET Her	Nominated	
2025	Themselves	Best Group	Nominated	
2026	Themselves	Best Group	Nominated	

== Brit Awards ==
The Brit Awards are the British Phonographic Industry's (BPI) annual music awards, celebrating the best in British and international music. FLO has received one award.

Year	Nominee / work	Award	Result	Ref.
2023	Themselves	Rising Star	Won	
2025	Themselves	R&B act	Nominated	

== Deezer Awards ==
The Deezer Awards is an award presented by the music streaming service Deezer, recognizing artists and albums that have achieved significant streaming success or popularity on their platform. FLO has received one award.

Year	Nominee / work	Award	Result	Ref.
2023	Themselves	Artists to Watch	Shortlisted	

== Global Awards ==
The Global Awards is an annual ceremony established by Global Media & Entertainment to celebrate the stars of music, news, and entertainment across a wide range of genres. FLO has won one award from two nominations.

Year	Nominee / work	Award	Result	Ref.
2023	Themselves	Best Hip-hop or R&B	Nominated	
2023	Themselves	Rising Star	Won	

== Grammy Awards ==
The Grammy Awards are awarded annually by the National Academy of Recording Arts and Sciences. FLO currently has one nomination as of 2025.

Year	Nominee / work	Award	Result	Ref.
2026	Access All Areas	Best Progressive R&B Album	Nominated	

== Guap Gala ==
The Guap Gala is a specific event focused on celebrating achievements in music, fashion, or another field, often with a focus on empowerment or success within a community. FLO has received one award.

Year	Nominee / work	Award	Result	Ref.
2022	Themselves	Music Artist to Watch	Won	

== MOBO Awards ==
The Music of Black Origin (MOBO) Awards were established by Kanya King, recognizing artists of any ethnicity or nationality performing black music. FLO has won one award from five nominations.

Year	Nominee / work	Award	Result	Ref.
2022	Themselves	Best Newcomer	Nominated	
2023	Themselves	Best Female Act	Nominated	
2025	Themselves	Best R&B/Soul Act	Nominated	
2026	Themselves	Best R&B/Soul Act	Won	
2026	"Access All Areas"	Album of the Year	Nominated	

== MTV ==
=== MTV Europe Music Awards ===
The MTV Europe Music Awards (EMAs) are presented by MTV Networks Europe, celebrating the most popular songs and singers in Europe. FLO has been nominated three times.

Year	Nominee / work	Award	Result	Ref.
2023	Themselves	Best Group	Longlisted	
2023	Themselves	Best New	Nominated	
2023	Themselves	Best Push	Nominated	

=== MTV Video Music Awards ===
The MTV Video Music Awards (VMAs) are an annual award show hosted by MTV to honor the best in the music video medium. FLO has been nominated three times.

Year	Nominee / work	Award	Result	Ref.
2023	"Losing You"	Push Performance of the Year	Nominated	
2023	Themselves	Group of the Year	Nominated	
2026	Themselves	Group of the Year	Nominated	

=== MTV Push ===
The MTV Push is an initiative by MTV aimed at promoting new artists or brands who are on the rise. Each month, MTV highlights one artist as the "Push Artist of the Month" and provides them with exposure across MTV's global network through performances, interviews, and music video rotation. FLO has received one award.

Year	Nominee / work	Award	Result	Ref.
2023	Themselves	MTV Push UK & Ireland	Won	

== NAACP Image Awards ==
The NAACP Image Awards are presented by the National Association for the Advancement of Colored People, these awards honor outstanding performances in film, television, music, and literature by people of color. FLO has been nominated three times.

Year	Nominee / work	Award	Result	Ref.
2024	Themselves	Outstanding New Artist	Nominated	
2025	"In My Bag" (with GloRilla)	Outstanding Duo, Group or Collaboration (Traditional)	Nominated	
2026	"The Mood" (with Kaytranada)	Outstanding Duo, Group or Collaboration (Contemporary)	Nominated	

== Popjustice Twenty Quid Prize ==
Established by the UK-based pop music website Popjustice in 2003, this annual prize awards £20 to the artist or group responsible for the best British pop single of the preceding year. FLO has been nominated once.

Year	Nominee / work	Award	Result	Ref.
2022	"Cardboard Box"	Best British Pop Single	Shortlisted	

== Rated Awards ==
The Rated Awards celebrate the best in UK urban music. Launched by the online platform GRM Daily, the awards aim to recognize and honor achievements in the urban music scene, including grime, hip-hop, and R&B. FLO has been nominated once.

Year	Nominee / work	Award	Result	Ref.
2022	Themselves	Female Artist of the Year	Nominated	

== Soul Train Awards ==
The Soul Train Music Awards are produced by the makers of Soul Train to honor the best in African-American culture, music and entertainment. FLO has been nominated three times.

Year	Nominee / work	Award	Result	Ref.
2023	"Fly Girl" (with Missy Elliott)	Best Collaboration	Nominated	
2023	Themselves	Best Group	Nominated	
2023	Themselves	Best New Artist	Nominated	
2026	Themselves	Spotify's RNB X International Artist	Pending	

== Urban Music Awards ==
The Urban Music Awards recognize the achievement of urban-based artists, producers, nightclubs, DJs, radio stations, and record labels around the World. FLO has been nominated five times.

Year	Nominee / work	Award	Result	Ref.
2023	Themselves	Best Female Act	Nominated	
2023	Themselves	Best Group	Nominated	
2023	“Cardboard Box”	Best Single	Nominated	
2023	Themselves	Most Creative Artist	Nominated	
2023	Themselves	Most Inspiring Act	Nominated	
