= 2018 Global Awards =

- Date: 1 March 2018
- Venue: Hammersmith Apollo
- Country: United Kingdom
- Hosted by: Roman Kemp; Rochelle Humes; Myleene Klass
- Most awards: Little Mix (3)
- Most nominations: Ed Sheeran; Camila Cabello; Little Mix (4 each)
- Website: https://www.global.com/awards/

Television/radio coverage
- Network: Capital FM; Capital TV; Heart TV; The Capital FM Website

The 2018 Global Awards ceremony was held on Thursday, 1 March 2018 at London's Eventim Apollo. It started at 7:30 pm and was shown live on Capital TV and Heart TV. It was also available to watch on the Capital FM Website, on all the socials and on the radio. The Capital FM Global Awards radio schedule was as follows: Backstage on Capital Drive Time from 4pm GMT until 7pm GMT and then JJ, live from backstage from 7pm GMT chatting to the guests.

Performances and special appearances from Sam Smith, Rita Ora, Kasabian, Martin Garrix, Andrea Bocelli and Liam Payne.

Roman Kemp, Rochelle Humes and Myleene Klass hosted the ceremony.

== Performances ==
Order	Artist	Song(s)
1	Rita Ora	"Your Song", "Lonely Together" & "Anywhere"
2	Andrea Bocelli	"Time to Say Goodbye" & "Nessun Dorma"
3	Sam Smith	"Too Good at Goodbyes" & "Stay With Me"
4	Liam Payne	"Strip That Down" and "For You" (with Rita Ora)
5	Kasabian	"You're in Love with a Psycho" and "Fire"
6	Martin Garrix	"Scared to Be Lonely" (remix), "In the Name of Love" (remix), "Animals", "So Far Away", "Together", "Forever", "There for You", "Tremor" & "Like I Do" (with David Guetta) (David Guetta cover)

== Nominees and winners ==
The list of nominees was announced in December 2017. Winners are listed first, in bold.

Best Song (Public Vote) (Presented by Gary Barlow & Emma Bunton)	Best Group (Public Vote) (Presented by Liam Payne & Anne-Marie)
**Little Mix feat. Stormzy – "Power"**; Camila Cabello feat. Young Thug – "Havana"; Ed Sheeran – "Shape of You"; Niall Horan – "Slow Hands"; Shawn Mendes – "There's Nothing Holdin' Me Back"	**Little Mix**; The Chainsmokers; Clean Bandit; Coldplay; Take That
Best Male (Public Vote) (Presented by Chris & Kem)	Best Female (Public Vote) (Presented by Jess Glynne & Rudimental)
**Shawn Mendes**; Ed Sheeran; Justin Bieber; Liam Payne; Niall Horan	**Camila Cabello**; Ariana Grande; Dua Lipa; Selena Gomez; Taylor Swift
Best British Artist or Group (Public Vote) (Presented by Laura Dees & Lizzy Yarnold)	Best News Interview, Moment or Debate (Presented by Kate Garraway)
**Little Mix**; Dua Lipa; Ed Sheeran; Liam Gallagher; Liam Payne	**First Responders**
Rising Star Award (Presented by Craig David & Marvin Humes)	Best Classical Artist (Presented by John Suchet & Charlotte Hawkins)
**Mabel**; Yungen; Stefflon Don; Dua Lipa; Jax Jones	**Andrea Bocelli**; André Rieu; Nicola Benedetti; Ji Liu; Ayoub Sisters
Most Played Award (Presented by Miss Piggy & Kermit the Frog)	Mass Appeal Award (Presented by Martin Garrix & David Guetta)
**Shape of You — Ed Sheeran**	**Sam Smith**; Ed Sheeran; Paloma Faith; P!nk; James Arthur
Social Media Superstars (Presented by Paloma Faith & Big Shaq)	Best RnB, Hip Hop or Grime (Presented by James Bay & Yinka)
**Caspar Lee**; Oli White; Cameron Dallas; Zoella; KSI	**Stormzy**; J Hus; Drake; Mabel; Post Malone
Best Pop Dance (Presented by John Newman & Daisy Lowe)	Best Indie (Presented by Chris Moyles & Johnny Vaughan)
**Martin Garrix**; Sigala; David Guetta; Calvin Harris; Craig David	**Kasabian**; Liam Gallagher; Noel Gallagher's High Flying Birds; Florence and the Machine; Blossoms
Best Pop (Presented by Abbey Clancy, Michael Clifford and Luke Hemmings)	The Global Special Award (Presented by Roman Kemp and Myleene Klass)
**Rita Ora**; Liam Payne; Shawn Mendes; Charlie Puth; Little Mix	**Liam Payne**
