= Oyeleye =

Oyèlẹ́yẹ
- Gender: Male
- Language: Yoruba

Origin
- Origin: Nigeria
- Meaning: Chieftaincy has value
- Region of origin: South West, Nigeria

Oyèlẹ́yẹ is a Nigerian given name and a surname. It is a male name and of Yoruba origin, which means "Chieftaincy has value." The diminutive form can be Lẹ́yẹ in a shorter form.

== Notable individuals with the name ==
- Oyeleye Oyediran, Nigerian political scientist
- Olateju Oyeleye (1924–2013), Nigerian businessman
- Oluwafemi Oyeleye (born 1994), Nigerian boxer
