= Folake =

Folake (Yoruba: Fọlákẹ́, pronounced [fɔ̄lákɛ́]) is a female Yoruba given name used in Nigeria, meaning 'petted with wealth' or shortened from longer names like Afọlákẹ́ or Olúfọlákẹ́. Notable people with the name include:

- Folake Akinyemi (born 1990), Nigerian-Norwegian sprinter
- Folake Coker (born 1974), Nigerian fashion designer
- Folake Olayinka, Nigerian physician
- Folake Olowofoyeku (born 1983), Nigerian actress and musician
- Folake Olunloyo, Nigerian politician
- Folake Onayemi (1964–2024), Nigerian literary scholar
- Folake Solanke (born 1932), Nigerian lawyer
