= Ole (name) =

- Pronunciation: Urban East Norwegian: [ˈûːlə]
- Gender: Masculine

Origin
- Origin: Old Norse
- Meaning: "Ancestor's descendant"

Other names
- Related names: Ola, Olaf, Olav, Oluf, Olof, Olov, Olin, Olen

Ole is a Danish and Norwegian masculine given name, derived from the Old Norse name Óláfr, meaning "ancestor's descendant".

Notable people with the given name include:

== Given name ==
- Ole Erik Almlid, Norwegian newspaper editor and business executive
- Ole Anderson, American wrestler
- Ole Andreas Halvorsen, Norwegian hedge fund manager
- Ole Barman, Norwegian novelist
- Ole Einar Bjørndalen, Norwegian biathlete
- Ole Barndorff-Nielsen, Danish mathematician
- Ole Beich, Danish bassist
- Ole E. Benson, American politician
- Ole Didrik Blomberg (born 2000), Norwegian footballer
- Ole Bornedal, Danish film director
- Ole Bull, Norwegian violinist
- Ole Thorben Buschhüter (born 1976), German politician
- Ole Kirk Christiansen, Danish businessman, founder of the Lego Group
- Ole Enersen (born 2002), Norwegian footballer
- Ole Ernst, Danish actor
- Ole Espersen, Danish politician
- Ole Evinrude, Norwegian-born American outboard manufacturer
- Ole Humpich (born 1995), German politician
- Ole Bjørn Kraft, Danish journalist and politician
- Ole Krüger (born 1983), German politician
- Ole Lund Kirkegaard, Danish author
- Ole Monty, Danish actor
- Ole Nydahl, Danish founder and director of Diamond Way
- Ole Olsen (filmmaker) (1863–1943), Danish filmmaker, founder of Nordisk Film
- Ole Olsen (speedway rider), Danish speedway rider
- Ole Birk Olesen (born 1972), Danish politician
- Ole Qvist, Danish goalkeeper
- Ole Ritter, Danish racing cyclist
- Ole Edvart Rølvaag, Norwegian-American novelist and professor
- Ole Rømer, Danish astronomer
- Ole O. Sageng, American politician
- Ole Gunnar Solskjær, Norwegian footballer
- Ole Stavad, Danish politician
- Ole Bjørn Sundgot (born 1972), Norwegian football player and manager
- Ole Svendsen, Danish boxer
- Ole Tinghaug, Norwegian politician
- Ole Worm, Danish physician and antiquary

== Surname ==
- Eduard Ole (1898–1995), Estonian painter

== See also ==
- Ola (given name)
