= Ayoyinka (given name) =

Yoruba given name

Ayòyínká
- Gender: Male
- Language: Yoruba

Origin
- Origin: Yorubaland
- Meaning: Joy surrounds me.
- Region of origin: Yorubaland [Nigeria, Benin, Togo]

Ayòyínká is a given male name of Yoruba origin. It means "Joy surrounds me.". It is a name that is always used for everyday prayers. Ayòyínká is a name that is distinctive, carrying a strong and meaningful undertone for inner peace. The diminutive form is Yínká (Surrounds me.) which is the shorter form with Yoruba phonetic reduction. Other full forms are Adéyínká (crown/royalty surrounds me), Olayinka (prestige/wealth surrounds me), Akínyínká (warriors/valour surrounds me), Olúyínká (God/my lord surrounds me), etc.

== Notable individuals with the name ==
- Bukayo Saka (born 2001), Nigerian English professional footballer.
- Abiodun Ayoyinka (born 1960), Nigerian comic actor.
- Tosin Abasi (born 1983), Nigerian American musician.
