= OLA Girls Senior High School =

OLA Girls Senior High School may refer to:

- OLA Girls Senior High School (Kenyasi), Ghana
- OLA Girls Senior High School (Ho), Ghana

== See also ==
- Ola High School (disambiguation)
