= Ronke (name) =

Name

- Gender: Female
- Language: Yoruba

Origin
- Word/name: Nigeria
- Meaning: found someone to cherish

listen

Ronke (RON-keh (/rɒnˈke/)) is a Yoruba name meaning "brings good things" or "brings prosperity," predominantly used for girls. With a melodic sound and rich cultural heritage, it symbolizes positivity and strength. Rarely used in the U.S., it had 5 occurrences in 1972.

Ronke can also be interpreted as "someone/something to cherish," especially in extended forms like Aderonke, Ibironke, Aronke, and Folaronke.

== Notable people ==
- Ronke Odusanya, Nigerian actress
- Ronkẹ Adékoluẹjo, actress
- Ronke Olabisi, professor
- Ronke Oshodi Oke Nigerian actress
- Ronke Ademiluyi, fashion entrepreneur
- Ronke Giwa-Onafuwa, radio presenter

== As a surname ==
- Ben Ronke, footballer
