= Olagoke Olabisi =

Nigerian chemical engineer

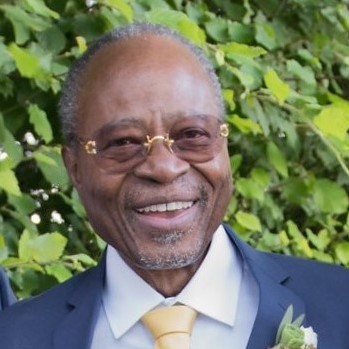
- Born: September 25, 1943 (age 83); Osogbo, Osun State, Nigeria
- Education: Purdue University Chemical Engineering (BS), Industrial Management (BS), University of California Berkeley Chemical Engineering (MS), Case Western Reserve University Macromolecular Science and Engineering (Ph.D.), New Jersey Institute of Technology, Management Engineering (MS)
- Known for: Polymer-Polymer Miscibility, Structural Web
- Spouse: Juliet Olabisi
- Awards: The John Clarence Lottes Memorial Award as the best senior student on the basis of scholastic ability, Purdue University, Chemical Engineering Department, Merit Award for Excellence in the Field of Engineering and Technology, Ministry of Science and Technology, Nigeria, Special Award for Dynamic, Innovative, and Result-Oriented Leadership, Unilag Consult University of Lagos, Award of Excellence in Leadership, Unilag Consult University of Lagos, Special Award for "New Concepts & Best Idea for Using Plastic Material in New Application" SABIC, Certificate of Recognition for Contribution to the Building of a Research Paradigm Team Saudi Aramco Consulting Services Department (CSD), Outstanding Achievement Award in Engineering & Operations Services Saudi Aramco Consulting Services Department (CSD), Outstanding Achievement Award by US Chapter of Nigerian Society of Chemical Engineers, Distinguished Leadership Award for Excellent Leadership, Extraordinary Commitment & Years of Loyal Service by Faculty of Engineering Lagos State University, Senior Traveling Fellowship Award, Association of Commonwealth Universities (ACU).
- Scientific career
- Fields: Chemical engineering
- Workplaces: Union Carbide Corporation, University of Lagos, Lagos State University, Oak Ridge National Laboratory, King Fahd University of Petroleum and Minerals, Saudi Aramco, Aegion, Infra-Tech Consulting LLC
- Doctoral advisor: Robert Simha

Olagoke Olabisi (AKA Lagoke Labisi) is a Nigeria-American author, editor, educator, mentor, inventor, and entrepreneur. A chemical engineer, Olagoke is the Chief Consultant and CEO of Infra-Tech Consulting LLC, an energy consulting company focused on corrosion and materials engineering.

He has 9 patents and a total of 99 publications including Fugacity and Vapor Pressure of Non-Polar Liquids at Low Temperatures, Thermoplastics Beyond the Year 2000: A Paradigm, and Handbook of Thermoplastics, 2nd Edition. His 1997 book, Handbook of Thermoplastics, was categorized by its publishers as a bestselling handbook within the niche field of engineering and plastics materials science.

He has been involved in academia and industry in the United States, Nigeria, Saudi Arabia, and Kuwait. He mentors students and young professionals.

== Early life and education ==
Born in Osogbo, Osun State, Nigeria, Olabisi had his secondary school education at Ibadan Boys' High School Oyo State and proceeded to Government College, Ibadan, with a Western Region scholarship, where he completed his advanced high school education in 1964. He was a 1965 recipient of a scholarship award from the African Scholarship Program of American Universities (ASPAU) administered by Africa-America Institute (AAI), to study chemical engineering at Purdue University, Indiana. In 1969, he graduated with two degrees: one in chemical engineering and the other in industrial management.

He was the recipient of The John Clarence Lottes Memorial Award as the best senior student based on scholastic ability in chemical engineering and his senior project was published.

Olabisi proceeded to the University of California, Berkeley where he earned MS degree in chemical engineering in 1971 with a thesis entitled "Secondary and Primary Normal Stresses, Hole Error, and Reservoir Edge Effects in Cone-and-Plate Flow of Polymer Solutions", whose results were published in an article with the same title. He furthered his studies and earned a PhD degree in macromolecular science and engineering at Case-Western Reserve University in 1973, with a dissertation entitled Pressure-volume-temperature properties of amorphous and crystallizable polymers and oligomers (which is cited in an associated journal article) under the tutelage of Robert Simha. In 1980, he earned an MS degree in engineering management at the New Jersey Institute of Technology through a part-time self-development program.

== Career ==
Olabisi received a PhD degree just before the 1973 oil crisis which dramatically drove up the price of crude oil, petrochemicals, polymers, and plastics. An immediate plastics industry response to the crisis was focusing on material conservation. There arose the need for plastic processes to employ less than a full density of plastic material in producing lightweight automotive and other materials with structural properties matching or exceeding those of solid (full density) plastic articles. While employed at the R&D Department of Union Carbide Corporation Olabisi earned eight patents that addressed the conservation issue. The two key process patents are: Process for the molding of plastics structural web and the resulting articles and Structural foam molding process.

The conservation activity of developing new plastic materials through the blending of two or more structurally different homopolymers, copolymers, terpolymers, and other plastics, resulted in Olabisi's publications on Polyblends, Polymer Compatibilization: Blends of Polyarylethers with Styrenic Interpolymers and others. As part of the industry-university interaction with Polytechnic Institute of New York, Olabisi was appointed adjunct professor of chemical engineering to teach a graduate-level course based on his book, Polymer-Polymer Miscibility that provided some basis for research projects on plastics materials conservation.

Following the impact of 1973 oil crisis, the Nigerian National Petroleum Corporation (NNPC) was established (1977) and, in the same year, Nigeria joined OPEC as the 11th member country. A fully-fledged petrochemical complex was in operation in Nigeria in the early 1980s when Olabisi was appointed a professor of chemical engineering, University of Lagos. The need for teaching, research, and public service in petrochemicals, plastics, and polymer materials engineering was high in the country. Olabisi initiated courses and research for a PhD program in petrochemicals. Through his adjunct professorship and other linkages with the University of Akron and Case Western Reserve University, he was able to secure opportunities for some students to earn postgraduate fellowships to pursue PhD in the two universities. These graduates eventually became professors, executives of government parastatals, or captains of industry.

In response to the global events, the new Lagos State University (LASU), established in 1985, decided on having a comprehensive engineering program and Olabisi was appointed the foundation dean of the faculty of engineering, technology, and environmental sciences (FETES) in 1985. Aside from establishing the traditional departments, Olabisi established a department of polymer technology, the first such department in any Nigerian university. An award of the Association of Commonwealth Universities (ACU) Senior Traveling Fellowship enabled him to establish a fruitful linkage with the University of Adelaide resulting in LASU receiving an equipment donation worth more than a million dollars in 1987. On returning to the University of Lagos in 1987, Olabisi was appointed the Head of the Department, of Chemical Engineering.

By 1988, the devaluation of the Naira forced an economic quandary on Nigeria and Olabisi was appointed the managing director, UNILAG Consult, University of Lagos. In response to the economic climate, he organized the National Workshop on Economic Recovery Program. He also initiated activities on Baseline Ecological Studies of the Niger Delta Basin; Soil Maps of Nigeria; and assisting the government's ongoing Delivery of Technical Aid to Equatorial Guinea. His activities at UNILAG Consult earned Olabisi a special award for dynamic, innovative, and result-oriented leadership in 1990. Olabisi was the Founder and CEO of the African Biographical Centre LTD, Publisher of Who's Who in Nigerian Universities and Research Institutes.

Before 1990, gel-casting of ceramic powders was a continuing cooperative research program. between Allied-Signal Aerospace Company and Oak Ridge National Laboratory (ORNL). As a visiting consultant with the Oak Ridge National Laboratory during the summer of 1990, Olabisi had an Energy Systems Invention Disclosure (ESID No. 917-X: Alternative Low-Toxicity Monomeric Gel Casting Methodology for Molding Ceramic Powders for High-Heat Engine Components relating to the program, which involved the use of a variety of water-soluble monomers. The results were subsumed in the patent entitled Method for molding ceramic powders using a water-based gel casting.

In spite of the 1973 oil crisis and the 1979 oil crisis, the petrochemicals organizations in the OPEC countries, including SABIC, still depended on licensing third-party process technologies to fulfil their resin needs. One of the ways SABIC sought to reduce or eliminate the dependence was to initiate a research program at the Research Institute, King Fahd University of Petroleum and Minerals KFUPM, Dhahran, Saudi Arabia. In 1990, Olabisi was appointed a professor and Senior Research Engineer at KFUPM. His activities in the SABIC-sponsored program resulted in a joint patent entitled Catalyst and process for ethylene oligomerization. His subsequent activities as a Consulting Engineering Specialist at Saudi Aramco earned Olabisi a 2003 Saudi Aramco Certificate of Recognition for Outstanding Achievements in Engineering & Operations Services. He had several publications exemplified by some key articles.

The United States Department of Transportation (DOT) Pipeline & Hazardous Materials Safety Administration (PHMSA) sponsored a research project DTPH56-08-T-000012 at Corrpro (a subsidiary of Aegion). In 2007, Olabisi was appointed director, Internal Corrosion Engineering, as well as the principal investigator of the PHMSA project, the report of which made an impact on the external corrosion direct assessment (ECDA) process. He also became the lead developer of the Pipeline Corrosion Integrity Management (PCIM) Course for NACE International. The other Corrpro Oil and Gas corrosion projects he managed were on behalf of several clients including ENI US Operating Co., Inc. North Slope Alaska; Pioneer Natural Resources Alaska, Inc. North Slope Alaska; Gulf South Pipeline Company LP; Boardwalk Pipeline Partners, LP; SCANA Transmission Pipelines; Trunkline LNG Company, LLC; Cheniere Energy; and Murphy Exploration & Production Company. His contributions to the Internal Corrosion Monitoring Services (ICMS) Project of Kuwait Oil Company included a publication on Black Powder in Export Gas Lines as well as others. He continues to consult In his capacity as the Chief Consultant, Infra-Tech Consulting LLC, Olabisi remains a member of international professional and engineering organizations.

== Honors and awards ==
- 1966 Member of Omega Chi Epsilon Honor Society, Zeta Chapter
- 1968 Member of Tau Beta Pi Honor Society, Alpha of Indiana
- 1968 Purdue University President's Academic Award
- 1969 Purdue University President's Academic Award
- 1969 The John Clarence Lottes Memorial Award as the best senior student based on scholastic ability, Purdue University, School of Chemical Engineering
- 1974 Member of Sigma Xi Honor Society, The Scientific Research Society of North America, Union Carbide Plastics Chapter
- 1975 Member of The New York Academy of Sciences
- 1986 Senior Traveling Fellowship Award, Association of Commonwealth Universities (ACU)
- 1989 Merit Award for Excellence in the Field of Engineering and Technology, Ministry of Science and Technology, Nigeria
- 1990 Special Award for Dynamic, Innovative, and Result-Oriented Leadership by UNILAG Consult University of Lagos
- 1991 Fellow of the Nigerian Society of Chemical Engineers
- 1996 SABIC Special Award for "New concepts & Best Idea for Using Plastic Material in New Application"
- 1999 Fellow of the Nigerian Society of Engineers
- 2001 Saudi Aramco Outstanding Achievement Award in Engineering & Operations Services.
- 2003 Saudi Aramco Certificate of Recognition for Contribution to the Building of a Research Paradigm Team.
- 2007 Outstanding Achievement Award by US Chapter of Nigerian Society of Chemical Engineers.
- 2022 A Past Dean, Faculty of Engineering Award for Excellent Leadership, Extraordinary Commitment & Years of Loyal Service by Faculty of Engineering Lagos State University.
- 2022 Fellow of the Nigerian Academy of Engineering.
- 2023 A Past Head of Department Award in Commemoration of the 50th Anniversary of the Department of Chemical and Petroleum Engineering, University of Lagos.
- 2024 A Past Managing Director of UNILAG Consult Award in Recognition of Exceptional Leadership, Visionary Guidance, and Invaluable Contributions by UNILAG Consult University of Lagos.

== Patents and publications ==
Olabisi is an author, editor, educator, mentor, inventor, and entrepreneur; he has 9 patents and a total of 99 publications. on different topics in the fields of Chemical Engineering, Materials Engineering, Corrosion, Petrochemicals, Oil and Gas.

== Personal life ==
Olagoke Olabisi resides with his wife, Juliet Olabisi, in Sugar Land, Texas.
