= Olateju =

- Gender: Unisex
- Language: Yoruba

Origin
- Word/name: Nigeria
- Meaning: Vast wealth

Olateju is a unisex Nigerian given name. Notable people with the name include:

- O-T Fagbenle (Olatunde Olateju Olaolorun Fagbenle; born 1981), English actor, writer and director
- Olateju Oyeleye (1924–2013), Nigerian businessman
