= Adeyinka =

Adéyínká is a given name and surname of Yoruba origin, meaning "the crown or royalty surrounds me". People with this name include:

== Given name ==
- Adeyinka Afolayan, Nigerian professor
- Adeyinka Asekun (born 1956), Nigerian banker and diplomat
- Adeyinka Faleti (born 1976), Nigerian-American politician and veteran
- Adeyinka Gladys Falusi, Nigerian academic
- Adeyinka Oyekan (1911–2003), former Oba of Lagos

== Surname ==
- Adewale Adeyinka (born 1996), Nigerian footballer
- Gbenga Adeyinka, Nigerian actor, comedian, radio and TV presenter, writer, and MC
- Bishop Olayinka Adeyinka

Nigerian Bishop, Prophet, Pastor and Founder of KCCF (World Wide): Kingdom Covenant of Christ Fellowship.
