= Rutilotrixa lateralis =

Scientific classification
- Kingdom: Animalia
- Phylum: Arthropoda
- Clade: Pancrustacea
- Class: Insecta
- Order: Diptera
- Family: Tachinidae
- Subfamily: Dexiinae
- Tribe: Dexiini
- Genus: Rutilotrixa
- Species: R. lateralis

Binomial name
- Rutilotrixa lateralis (Walker, 1849)

Synonyms
- Chaetogaster diversa Paramonov, 1954; Trixa lateralis Walker, 1849

Species of fly

Rutilotrixa lateralis is a species of fly in the family Tachinidae.

== Distribution ==
Australia.
