= Oula (disambiguation) =

Oula is a village in southern Mali.

Oula may also refer to:

== People ==
- Oula Jääskeläinen (born 1969), Finnish figure skater
- Oula Palve (born 1992), Finnish ice hockey player
- Oula A. Alrifai (born 1986), Syrian-American writer, senior fellow at The Washington Institute for Near East Policy
- Oula Abass Traoré (born 1995), a Burkinabé footballer
- Innocent Oula (born 1961), Ugandan army officer
- Gaston Oula, Ivorian judoka at the 1984 Olympics

== Places ==
- Ula (Caria), western Anatolia, a town of ancient Caria
- Oula Department, a department of Burkina Faso
- Oula Township, Gansu, China

== See also ==
- Oola (disambiguation)
