= T. J. Fatinikun =

American football player (born 1991)

No. 96
- Position: Defensive end

Personal information
- Born: July 28, 1991 (age 35); Lagos, Nigeria
- Listed height: 6 ft 2 in (1.88 m)
- Listed weight: 250 lb (113 kg)

Career information
- High school: Perrysburg (Perrysburg, Ohio, U.S.)
- College: Toledo
- NFL draft: 2013: undrafted

Career history
- Portland Thunder (2014); Orlando Predators (2014); Tampa Bay Buccaneers (2014–2015)

Career NFL statistics
- Total tackles: 12
- Sacks: 0.5
- Stats at Pro Football Reference

Career AFL statistics
- Total tackles: 25
- Sacks: 4
- Forced fumbles: 3
- Pass deflections: 2
- Stats at ArenaFan.com

Ayokunle Olatunji "T. J." Fatinikun (born July 28, 1991) is a Nigerian-American former professional football defensive end who played for the Tampa Bay Buccaneers of the National Football League (NFL). He played college football at the University of Toledo. He also played for the Portland Thunder and Orlando Predators of the Arena Football League (AFL).

== Early life ==
Fatinikun played high school football at Perrysburg High School in Perrysburg, Ohio. He was named first-team all-conference, first-team all-district and special mention all-state. He recorded 65 tackles, 18 tackles for loss and nine sacks his senior year. Fatinikun made second-team all-league, recording 55 tackles, 11 tackles for loss and seven sacks his junior year. In his Junior year, he also led the Yellow Jackets to their first State Playoff berth in school history. He totaled 73 tackles, 15 tackles for loss and 10 sacks as a sophomore.

== College career ==
Fatinikun played for the Toledo Rockets from 2009 to 2012. Fatinikun was named third-team All-MAC in 2010, leading the defensive line with 51 tackles. He also led the team and was ninth in the MAC with 13 tackles for loss. He suffered a season-ending elbow injury against Eastern Michigan on October 8, 2011, still making third-team All-MAC.

== Professional career ==
Fatinikun was assigned to the Portland Thunder of the Arena Football League on October 18, 2013. He was traded to the Orlando Predators on May 26, 2014. He was placed on Other League Exempt on August 12, 2014.

Fatinikun was signed by the Tampa Bay Buccaneers of the National Football League on August 12, 2014. He was released by the Buccaneers on August 29, 2014. He was signed to the Buccaneers' practice squad on September 24, 2014, and promoted to the active roster on October 21, 2014. Fatinikun was placed on injured reserve with a knee injury on October 6, 2015. He was taken off injured reserve on February 8, 2016, and became a free agent on March 9, 2016.
