= Oola (disambiguation) =

Oola is a village in County Limerick, Ireland

Oola may also refer to:

== Places ==
- Oola, Bhutan, a village in central-southern Bhutan
- Oola, Estonia, a village in Rapla Parish, Rapla County, northwestern Estonia

== Other uses ==
- Oola, a Star Wars character

== See also ==
- Ola (disambiguation)
- Oula (disambiguation)
