= Olayemi =

Ọláyẹmí
- Gender: Unisex
- Language: Yoruba

Origin
- Origin: Yorubaland (Nigeria, Benin, Togo)
- Meaning: success befits me, i am worthy of wealth
- Region of origin: West Africa (Yorubaland)

listen

Ọláyẹmí, is a Yoruba given name meaning "a combination of prestige, success and wealth befits me", or I am worthy of wealth. This name can be found in the native Yoruba regions in Nigeria, Benin, Togo and other places there is a Yoruba populace. It can be male or female.

== Notable people with this name include ==
- Olayemi Ogunwole, Nigerian radio and television host, known professionally as Honey Pot
- Adeyemi Olayemi (born 1974), Nigerian politician, Chief Whip of the Ondo State House of Assembly, represents All Progressives Congress party
- Taiwo Olayemi Elufioye, Nigerian pharmacologist and researcher, University of Ibadan

== See also ==
- Ola (given name)
