= Ladapo =

- Gender: Male
- Language: Yoruba

Origin
- Origin: Nigerian
- Region of origin: South-west Nigeria

Other names
- Variant form: Oladapo
- Short form: Ola Dapo

Ladapo is both a surname and a given name of Yoruba origin. It is a contraction of Oladapo.

== Notable people with the name include ==
- Freddie Ladapo (born 1993), English footballer
- Joseph Ladapo (born 1978), Surgeon General of Florida
- Ladapo Ademola (1872–1962), Nigerian politician
- Tolu Ladapo (born 2004), Nigerian footballer
- Ladosu Ladapo (1929–2003), Nigerian Jurist
