= Global Awards =

Music award for Global network

- Current: 2024 Global Awards
- Venue: Hammersmith Apollo (2018–2020); Online (2021–2024)
- Country: United Kingdom
- Hosted by: Roman Kemp; Rochelle Humes; Myleene Klass; Kate Garraway
- First award: 1 March 2018; 8 years ago
- Website: Official website

Television/radio coverage
- Network: Capital FM; Capital TV (2018 ceremony only); Heart TV (2018 ceremony only); The Capital FM Website

The Global Awards are held by Global Media & Entertainment and reward music played on the British radio stations which are part of the Global network, including Capital, Capital XTRA, Heart, Classic FM, Smooth, Radio X, LBC and Gold, with the awards categories reflecting the songs, artists, programmes and news aired on each station.

== List of ceremonies ==
Year	Date	Venue	Broadcast	Sponsor	Hosts		
2018	1 March 2018	Hammersmith Apollo	Capital FM; Capital TV; Heart TV	—N/a	Roman Kemp	Rochelle Humes	Myleene Klass
2019	7 March 2019	Hammersmith Apollo	Capital FM; Capital TV; Heart TV	Very.co.uk	Roman Kemp	Rochelle Humes	Myleene Klass
2020	5 March 2020	Hammersmith Apollo	Capital FM; Capital TV; Heart TV	Very.co.uk	Roman Kemp	Kate Garraway	Myleene Klass
2021	3 May 2021	—	Global website	—N/a	No host		
2022	15 April 2022	—	Global website	—N/a	No host		
2023	31 March 2023	—	Global website	—N/a	No host		
2024	22 March 2024	—	Global website	—N/a	No host		

== 2018 ==
The Global Awards 2018 ceremony was held on Thursday 1 March 2018 at London's Eventim Apollo.

It started at 7:30 pm and was shown live on Capital TV and Heart TV. It was also available to watch on the Capital FM Website, on all the socials and on the radio. The Capital FM Global Awards radio schedule was as follows: Backstage on Capital Drive Time from 4 pm GMT until 7 pm GMT and then JJ, live from backstage from 7 pm GMT chatting to the guests.

Performances and special appearances from Sam Smith, Rita Ora, Kasabian, Martin Garrix, Andrea Bocelli and Liam Payne.

Roman Kemp, Rochelle Humes and Myleene Klass hosted the ceremony.

== 2019 ==
The Global Awards 2019 was held at London’s Eventim Apollo on 7 March 2019. There were performances and guest appearances from Little Mix, Lang Lang, Blossoms, Anne-Marie, Mark Ronson and Mabel. Roman Kemp, Rochelle Humes and Myleene Klass returned to host the ceremony.

== 2020 ==
The Global Awards 2020 was held at London's Eventim Apollo on 5 March 2020. There were performances and guest appearances from Ellie Goulding, Camila Cabello, Aitch, Stereophonics, Tones and I, Aled Jones and Russell Watson. Roman Kemp and Myleene Klass returned to host and were joined by new co-host Kate Garraway who replaced Rochelle Humes.

== 2021 ==
The Global Awards 2021 was not held in a physical location due to COVID-19 pandemic in the United Kingdom. The awards ceremony did not publish a list of nominees as in previous editions, announcing the winners through the company's official website and on socialnetwork pages. The list of winners is below:

- Best Female – Dua Lipa
- Best Male – Harry Styles
- Best Group – Little Mix
- Best British Act – Dua Lipa
- Best Classical Artist – The Kanneh-Masons
- Best Hip-Hop or R&B – Cardi B
- Best Indie Act – Nothing but Thieves
- Rising Star Award – Joel Corry
- Best Podcast – ‘Hunting Ghislaine’
- Most Played Song – "Don't Start Now" by Dua Lipa

== 2022 ==
The Global Awards 2022 was not held in a physical location due to the ongoing effects of the COVID-19 pandemic in the United Kingdom. Winners were announced through the company's official website and on social network pages on 14 April 2022.

== 2023 ==
As with the two previous ceremonies, the Global Awards 2023 was not held in a physical location. Winners were announced live on-air through the Global radio stations Capital FM, Capital XTRA, Heart FM, Radio X and Smooth Radio and the company's official website and on social network pages on 31 March 2023.

== 2024 ==
The 2024 Global Awards ceremony was held on Friday 22 March 2024 live on-air through the Global radio stations Capital FM, Capital XTRA, Heart FM, Radio X and Smooth Radio.

== Categories ==
Public vote
Jury vote
Not awarded

Timeline Awards Categories
Awards Category	Global Awards Ceremony						
Awards Category	2018	2019	2020	2021	2022	2023	2024
Best Song							
Best Group							
Best Male							
Best Female							
Best British Artist or Group							
The LBC Award							
Rising Star Award							
Best Classical Artist							
Most Played Song							
Mass Appeal Award							
Social Media Superstar							
Best Podcast							
Best RnB, Hip Hop or Grime							
Best Dance							
Best Pop							
Best Rock or Indie							
Global Legend							
Best Fans							

=== The Global Special Award ===
- Liam Payne (2018)
- Mark Ronson (2019)
- Stereophonics (2020)

=== Special Award for Creativity ===
- Lil Nas X (2022)

=== Best News Interview, Moment or Debate ===
- First Responders (2018)

=== The Very Award ===
- Joshua Hill (2019)
- Andy Smith (co-founder of Regenerate Charity) (2020)

== Most nominated and awarded acts ==
=== Most nominated ===
Artist	Nominations (as of 2024)
Ed Sheeran	18
Anne-Marie	12
Lewis Capaldi	12
Raye	12
Little Mix	10
Dua Lipa	9
Stormzy	9
Calvin Harris	8
Dave	8
Aitch	7
Beyoncé	7
Coldplay	7
Doja Cat	7
Harry Styles	7
Shawn Mendes	7
Taylor Swift	7

=== Most wins ===
Artist	Awards (as of 2024)
Little Mix	6
Dua Lipa	5
Ed Sheeran	5
Harry Styles	5
RAYE	4
Lewis Capaldi	3
Stormzy	3
Calvin Harris	3
Anne-Marie	2
Camila Cabello	2
Coldplay	2
Mark Ronson	2
Stereophonics	2

== Voting procedure ==
According to the Global Awards website, the voters used a secure online website to vote in 2018. Each voter was allowed to vote up to 5 times. To date, categories are judged by music industry representatives.

== See also ==
- Global
