= Rutilotrixa =

Scientific classification
- Kingdom: Animalia
- Phylum: Arthropoda
- Clade: Pancrustacea
- Class: Insecta
- Order: Diptera
- Family: Tachinidae
- Subfamily: Dexiinae
- Tribe: Dexiini
- Genus: Rutilotrixa; Townsend, 1933

Type species
- Trixa lateralis Walker, 1849

Synonyms
- Ola Paramonov, 1968; Ruya Paramonov, 1968

Genus of flies

Rutilotrixa is a genus of parasitic flies in the family Tachinidae.

== Species ==
- Rutilotrixa carinata Barraclough, 1992
- Rutilotrixa insectaria Paramonov, 1968
- Rutilotrixa lateralis (Walker, 1849)
- Rutilotrixa monstruosa (Paramonov, 1968)
- Rutilotrixa nigrithorax (Macquart, 1851)
- Rutilotrixa tessellata Barraclough, 1992
- Rutilotrixa westralica Paramonov, 1968
- Rutilotrixa wilsoni Paramonov, 1954

== Distribution ==
Australia
