= Adeyinka Asekun =

Nigerian banker and diplomat (born 1956)

High Commissioner of Nigeria to Canada
- In office 2017–2023
- President: Muhammadu Buhari; Bola Tinubu

Personal details
- Born: Adeyinka Olatokunbo Asekun; 11 June 1956 (age 70) Nigeria
- Education: University of Wisconsin–Madison (BSc); California State University (MBA)
- Occupation: Banker diplomat

Adeyinka Olatokunbo Asekun (Yoruba pronunciation; born 11 June 1956 in Nigeria) is a Nigerian banker and diplomat. He served as the Nigerian High Commissioner to Canada from 2017 to 2023.

== Education ==
Asekun attended the University of Wisconsin where he studied Business Administration and obtained a BSc in Business Administration majoring in Marketing. He obtained an MBA from the California State University system.
