= Olabisi =

Ọlábísí is a Yoruba given name and surname meaning "a combination of prestige, success and wealth has given birth to more". It may refer to:

== Given name ==
- Olabisi Afolabi (born 1975), Nigerian athlete
- Olabisi "Bisi" Johnson (born 1997), American gridiron football player
- Olabisi Onabanjo (1927 – 1990), Nigerian politician
- Olabisi Obafunke Silva (1962 – 2019), Woman Nigerian Curator
- Olabisi Ugbebor (born 1951), Nigerian professor

== Surname ==
- Olagoke Olabisi, (born 1943), Nigerian-American author, engineer and scientist
- Ronke Olabisi (born 1976), American engineer
- Wande Olabisi, Nigerian baseball player
