= Olajide =

Ọlájídé is both a surname and a given name of Yoruba origin that refers to a combination of prestige, success and wealth arising or resurrecting.

== People with the forename ==
- Olajide Adebayo, Nigerian Anglican bishop
- Olajide Aluko (1942–1991), Nigerian scholar
- Olajide Bejide (born 1985), Nigerian cricketer
- Olajide Ipinsagba (born 1964), Nigerian district senator
- Olajide Jimoh (born 1961), Nigerian politician
- Olajide Olatunji (born 1993), better known as KSI, English YouTuber and rapper
- Olajide Omotayo (born 1995), Nigerian professional table tennis player
- Olajide Williams (born 1988), Nigerian football player
- Olajide Williams (scientist) (born 1969), American neurologist
- Olajide Abubakar Rasak (born 2000), Nigerian streamer and tiktoker

== People with the surname ==
- Adedeji Stanley Olajide, Nigerian politician
- Adesope Olajide (born 1977), British-Nigerian television personality
- Funminiyi Olajide (born 2002), British long jumper
- Temi Olajide (born 2016), Nigerian child sleep consultant
- Tokunbo Olajide (born 1976), Canadian boxer
