= Olajide Ipinsagba =

Nigerian senator

Olajide Ipinsagba Emmanuel

Senator representing Ondo North
- Incumbent
- Assumed office 13 June 2023
- Preceded by: Robert Ajayi Boroffice

Personal details
- Born: 2 February 1964 (age 62) Ikare-Akoko, Southern Region, British Nigeria (now in Ondo State, Nigeria)
- Party: All Progressives Congress
- Profession: Politician; business man

Olajide Ipinsagba Emmanuel (born 2 February 1964) is a Nigerian politician who is currently the Senator representing Ondo North Senatorial District in the 10th Senate on the ticket of the ruling All Progressives Congress.

== Early career and education ==
Olajide was born on 2 February 1964 in Ikare-Akoko, Ondo State, South Western, Nigeria. He graduated from Rufus Giwa Polytecnic with HND Surveying in 1987. He Obtained his first master's degree in Business Administration from Delta State University, Abraka in 2000 and a second master's degree in Public Administration from Adekunle Ajasin University in 2012. He recently bagged a Ph.D in Business Administration from Nasarawa State University.

== Political career ==
He joined the public service in 2007 when he was appointed as Special Assistant on Industrialization to the Ondo State Governor in 2007. He was a member of Ondo State Transition Committee 2017 and a member of Rufus Giwa Polytecnic Governing Council between 2017 and 2018. He contested and became a Senator of the Federal Republic of Nigeria on June 13, 2023 after scoring the highest figure in 2023 Nigerian Senate elections in Ondo State to replace Robert Ajayi Boroffice. He is the Chairman, Senate Committee on public procurement and also the Vice Chairman, Senate Committee on petroleum downstream.
