= Yinka =

- Gender: Unisex
- Language: Yoruba language

Origin
- Origin: Yorubaland
- Meaning: Surround(s) me
- Region of origin: Yorubaland[Nigeria, Benin, Togo]

listen

Yínká is a unisex name in the Yoruba language. It is a contraction of "Yímiká", meaning "surround(s) me".

It is also a diminutive form of names such as Adéyínká (crown/royalty surrounds me), Akínyínká (warriors/valour surrounds me), Ayọ̀yínká (joy surrounds me), Ọláyínká (prestige/wealth surrounds me), Olúyínká (God/my lord surrounds me), etc.

== Notable individuals with the name ==
- Yinka Ayefele (born 1968), Nigerian music producer
- Yinka Ayenuwa (born 1986), Nigerian weightlifter
- Yinka Bokinni (born 1989), British radio and television presenter
- Yinka Charles (born 1970), British rapper, author, and activist, aka MC Reason, former member of 1990s band Love City Groove
- Yinka Davies (born 1970), Nigerian vocalist, dancer and lyricist
- Yinka Dare (1972–2004), Nigerian basketball player
- Yinka Faleti (born 1976), American veteran
- Oluyinka Idowu (born 1972), Nigerian-born British former long jumper nicknamed "Yinka"
- Yinka Ilori (born 1987), British artist
- Yinka Olukunga, Nigerian actress
- Yinka Quadri (born 1959), Nigerian actor, filmmaker, producer and director
- Yinka Shonibare (born 1962), Nigerian-British artist
- Yinka Sunmonu (born 1962), British writer and journalist
