= Olateju Oyeleye =

- Born: April 7, 1924; Ilesha, Osun State, Nigeria
- Died: July 1, 2013 (aged 89); Nigeria
- Occupations: Electrical engineer, business executive
- Known for: Setting up the first TV station in Africa
- Spouse: Anne Awujoola Smith) (m. 1956; died 1978) Comfort Olubunmi Awolowo) (m. 1979)
- Children: 6

Olateju Oyeleye (7 April 1924 – 1 July 2013) was a Nigerian electrical engineer and business executive. In 1959, he was hired by The Western Nigerian Television Station as a Development Engineer. He moved back from London to Nigeria for the position where he was responsible for setting up the television station, the first in Africa. He would later join the French oil company Total S.A. where he would become the Chief Operating Officer of Total Nigeria.

== Early life ==
He was born in Ilesha, Osun State, Nigeria. He was the son of a farmer, Pa Joseph Oyeleye Aare, whose main produce was cocoa, kolanut, and bitter kola. His mother, Madam Felicia Esan Oyeleye, was a "petty trader" who hawked beans and pap.

His early childhood was the foundation of his religious life and core values, where his parents through example developed his faith in God, "respect for others, desire for service, and passion for excellence". Teju Oyeleye attended Peter's Anglican Primary School, the equivalent to Elementary School in North America. He later attended Ilesha Grammar School, where he graduated in 1942. He had several important role models growing up.

His older brother, Daniel Babalola Oyeleye, got him his first job after high school at the Nigerian Post and Telegram, or P&T, organisation, where he worked for about 10 years. His older brother also encouraged him to follow his passion for science. While working at P&T, he developed a fascination for morse code and the science around how the telegraph key worked. Another mentor was the cousin of a good friend who was a teacher at Yaba Technical College. The cousin's explanation of how a telegraph key functioned and the relationship between electricity and magnetism was crucial in his selecting Electrical Engineering in college. A final role model for Teju was Mr. Joseph Onawumi, who encouraged him with his GCE Advanced level classes (the equivalent to AP classes) in Physics, Chemistry, and Mathematics and assisted him with his application to the University of London.

== Education ==
In 1952, Teju Oyeleye attended the University of London. The scholarship he earned for his exceptional scores on the GCE "A” level examinations, from the Western Nigeria Production Board, aided him in his goal to study Engineering at the university. The field of engineering and science and technology as a whole was relatively new for Teju entering college.

His high school, Ilesha Grammar School, did not offer any science classes which left him at a significant disadvantage compared to his peers at University of London. However, his unwavering interest in science and technology helped him overcome his shortcomings in the field. In 1957, he received an Electrical Engineering degree from the University of London. During his time at the University of London, Teju was the president of African Students and was the publicity officer of the college students union.

== Career ==
=== Ferguson Radio Corporation ===
After college, Teju Oyeleye spent two years (1957–1959) getting practical experience at Ferguson Radio Corporation, Enfield, North London. After his experience at Fergusson Radio, Teju Oyeleye returned to Nigeria with his wife Mrs. Funke Oyeleye, a registered nurse.

=== WNTV-WNBS (Western Nigeria Television and Broadcasting Service) ===
Back in Nigeria, Teju Oyeleye jumped into a much bigger project. The Western Nigerian Television Station hired him in September 1959 as a Development Engineer. This was the first television station in Africa which meant a lot of things were required of the company. First, the company needed to provide television service to the general public. They would then have to broadcast channels for the consumers to watch. This required a lot of professionals, many of whom were being called back from their dwellings in England, to come over and establish this new television station in Nigeria. Teju Oyeleye was one of the engineers chosen to fulfill the demand.

The television station grew rapidly since Teju's arrival. The shows started in black and white with shows only airing from four o'clock in the afternoon to midnight. The shows that aired included live programs, recorded programs, movies, interviews, outside broadcasts and the radio broadcasting he was also in charge with included the morning news, jingles, and talk shows. Color television arrived in 1975, a few years after the time Teju Oyeleye moved to his next professional challenge Total Nigeria Limited.

As West Nigerian Television and Broadcasting Services (WNTV-WNBS) developed and expanded from one city to the entire continent around the time of Teju's arrival, so did Teju's role in the company become much more integral to the company's success. Teju experienced a series of promotions from his initial program as Development Manager to his position as Chief Engineer, and eventually general manager in 1966 which was the equivalent of chief executive officer in North American companies. He was the first Nigerian general manager of the first television station in Africa.

Teju's management style was "collaborative in nature and his direct reports were given significant responsibility as well as the accountability that went along with it". In other words, he encouraged his employees and himself to work with each other to get most tasks done and his workers were responsible for the work they were assigned. He would often set goals for his workers and use simple data analysis to measure how close they came to accomplishing these goals.

"We set up the scheme of service, the staff regulations and the financial regulations. We were having a monthly meeting at which we would review the previous month and set out what we were going to do in the ensuing month. We had a programme committee under the chairmanship of the controller of programs. We used participatory management techniques in which each of the 6 HOD's [heads of department] participated in the management. The departments were Administration under the secretary, Engineering under the Chief Engineer, Programs under the Controller of Programs, News and Current Affairs under the Head of News and Commercial under the Commercial Manager who was located in Lagos because of the strategic location as the commercial and administrative capital at that time".

During his time as general manager, he mentored a lot of second generation Television Station CEOs. A number of his pupils eventually went on to head the newer TV stations while they were being created all across Nigeria.

=== Total Nigeria ===
Eventually Teju felt it was time to leave his executive position at WNTV-WNBS. He made note that "Anytime you don't feel you're contributing sufficiently to a job… it's time to leave". When he joined Total in 1973, he started as an Assistant Operations Manager. However, in a span of six years and five promotions, he had risen to the rank of general manager, which in this scenario was the equivalent to chief operating officer. He held this position for another six years, until 1984. His experience as general manager at Western Nigeria Television was not a waste when it came to climbing the ranks. He explained during our interview, "No experience is lost if you value it well".

Prior to him, no other Nigerian had risen to that level in the organisation. At the time he joined Total they were ranked number three in Nigeria in terms of productivity amongst the petroleum companies. Eleven years later when he was promoted from his position as general manager (In this scenario he was the chief operating officer), the brand had risen to be number one in Nigeria.

For his next assignment, Engineer Oyeleye was asked to help set up several new ventures (similar to incubator companies) for Total. For the three years he spent in the role of Group Executive Director of Total Nigeria Subsidiaries, Engr. Oyeleye formed several successful subsidiaries that grew significantly in size. The Nigerian Gas Cylinder Manufacturing company was the first of its kind in Nigeria and manufactured gas cylinders that were used for cooking in almost every home. Another highly successful subsidiary supplied bitumen (road tar) and lubricants to the country. Teju Oyeleye retired from Total in 1991, but remained on the board of directors until 1994. He was succeeded as general manager by Sunny A. Olu Jegede.

== Professional organizations ==
=== Nigerian Society of Engineers ===
In 1958, Olateju Oyeleye and Chief G.O. Aiwereoba formed the Nigerian Society of Engineers in London, England. After several meetings, the inaugural meeting on the Nigerian Society of Engineers was held at the Nigerian house in London in February that same year. Engr. Teju Oyeleye took on the position of Secretary-General during the earlier years of the organisation, starting from when Chief G.O. Aiwereoba was president. Aiwereoba stepped down the following year and a new president was elected every two years. Teju Oyeleye took over the organisation for two years, in 1976 to 1977.

Nigerian Society of Engineers was the largest body in Africa that recognised students and graduate engineers. It was founded to create a more unionised voice of Nigeria's engineers so they could discuss with government officials and unofficial authorities topics related to technology. It also served as a beacon of knowledge where so many experienced engineers gathered to share their experiences with the less experienced engineers and also other officials not directly involved in the engineering profession. However, the most important function of this society was to promote the ideas and interests of its members and to protect each member and their families with backup monetary support. The Nigerian Society has over time split into several divisions. A few of these divisions include one for Chemical Engineers (NSCE), one for Civil Engineers (NICE), and one for female engineers, APWE.

=== Nigerian Institute of Management ===
Engr. Teju Oyeleye was elected in 1988 to be the eighth president of the Nigerian Institute of Management. The Nigerian Institute of Management was designed to educate any person interested in pursuing a management profession in Nigeria. It sets the standard of knowledge for all managers and ensures that these managers are aware of all the skills vital to successfully running a company. It also judges all potential managers on their qualifications and denies those who are not up to par a profession in the management field.

The Institute was founded in 1961 to educate managers and professionals interested in management with practical skills necessary to assertively and effectively manage a company. The organisation's goal was to educate positive managing traits; like the drive to find more economically efficient ways, being more transparent with all issues, and to avoid fraudulent and unethical practices taking place, in a manager's respective company. Teju's main responsibility was to decide which standards should be necessary for a manager to run a company. In 1991, however, he stepped down from his position at this organisation.

== Religious life ==
Olateju Oyeleye was baptised at age two and confirmed at age eighteen by Archbishop L.G. Vinnig. He was a devout Christian, who read the bible from Genesis to Revelation at age fourteen. Throughout his life he devoted at least one hour to bible study and prayer each day ("A Life of…"). His religion strongly influenced his life and his success at work. He made it his objective to make his life so exemplary that people would follow suit.

He regularly attended the Cathedral Church of Christ and St Peters Church Isona Ilesa. He also attended Church of Pentecost, or the Anglican Communion where he was baptised, at Festac Town. In the Cathedral Church of Christ, he was a member of the Torch Bearers society while at Church of Pentecost, he was a grand patron of the Fountain of Hope Society. During our interview, Teju explained, "Christianity is a way of life. It is a way of living. The power of positive thinking will succeed you in everything you are doing.”

== Personal life ==
Teju Oyeleye married Anne Awujoola Oyeleye (née Smith) in London, England in 1956. Mrs. Oyeleye was a registered nurse who taught at the Jericho Nursing School in Ibadan after they moved to Nigeria. They had 3 children Dr. Layi Oyeleye, Dr. Gunju Oyeleye, and Dr. Biola Oyeleye who are engineers and an ophthalmologist by training, respectively. Mrs Oyeleye died in a car accident in March 1978.

After the death of his first wife, he married Comfort Olubunmi Oyeleye (née Awolowo), an accounting executive in 1979. They have 3 children; Tolu, Kike and Fola.

He died in July 2013 at the age of 89.

== Awards and commendations ==
In December 2003, Teju received an Officer of the Order of the Niger (OON) from previous Nigerian president, Olusegun Obasanjo. This was one of the highest awards given by the president of Nigeria. This award acknowledges his National development, or all the renovations Engr. Olateju Oyeleye made to Nigeria, including his work at WNTV-WNBS, Total Nigeria PLC, NSE, NIM, NCC, and many others.
