= Olayemi Ogunwole =

Nigerian radio and TV host

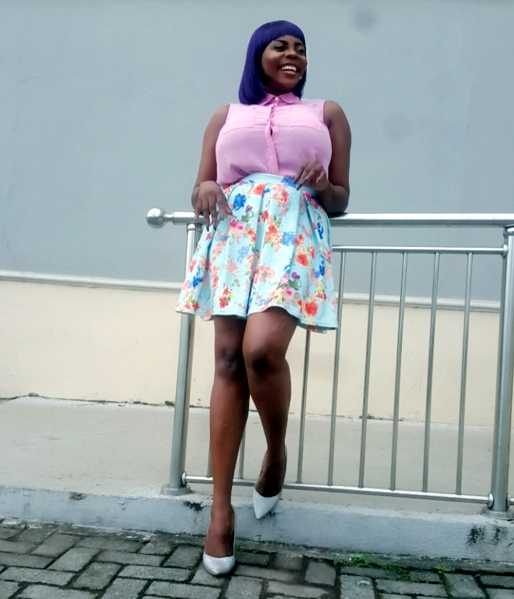
- Olayemi Ogunwole popularly known as HoneyPot in Lagos, Nigeria
- Education: Obafemi Awolowo University
- Presenting career
- Show: Chat Hour
- Stations: 102.3 MAX FM, Lagos
- Network: TVC Communications
- Time slot: 8pm - 11pm (GMT +1), Mondays - Thursdays
- Show: Entertainment Splash
- Station: TV Continental
- Network: TVC Communications
- Time slot: 1pm - 2pm (GMT +1), Mondays - Fridays
- Country: Nigeria
- Previous show: Midday Belt

Olayemi Ogunwole popularly known as Honey Pot is a radio and TV host with TVC Communications, Lagos, Nigeria.

== Education ==
Honey Pot is a graduate of English from the Obafemi Awolowo University, Nigeria.

== Career ==
=== Early broadcasting career ===
She started out her broadcasting career during her university days at the OAU, Ile-Ife as a TV host with NTA Ile-Ife where she anchored Fact Finding with Yemi. She was also a member of the Orientation Broadcasting Service (OBS) during her National Youth Service year in Anambra State, Nigeria.

=== Later broadcasting career ===
After her NYSC year, she proceeded to the Bisi Olatilo Show (BOS). After a spell at BOS, she went to the FRCN training school. She went on to Rock City 101.9 FM, Abeokuta, where she hosted Rock Game and Read the News and then to Star 101.5 FM, where she hosted the Midday Belt and also read the news. She then proceeded to Rainbow 94.1 FM, where she rose to the position of Head of Programmes before her present spell at Max FM (previously Radio Continental).

=== Other career ===
Apart from her broadcasting career, Honeypot has also voiced commercials for brands like Harpic, First Monie by First Bank and other commercials. She hosted the 2017 City People Music Awards alongside Ruggedman.

== Awards and recognitions ==
She was given a Special Recognition Award for her remarkable performance in reporting Entertainment on TV via Entertainment Splash by City People in 2016.
