= Olayinka =

- Gender: Unisex, although predominantly male
- Language: Yoruba language

Origin
- Origin: Yorubaland
- Meaning: A combination of wealth, prestige, success, nobility, majesty, grace and/or dignity surrounds me
- Region of origin: Yorubaland(Nigeria, Benin, Togo)

Ọláyínká is a given name (rooted from Yinka) and surname of Yoruba origin, meaning "a combination of prestige, success and wealth surrounds me".

The diminutive form or root morpheme of Ọláyínká is "Ọlá", which means (a combination of) wealth, prestige, success, nobility, majesty, grace and/or dignity.

== Notable people with the name include ==
=== First name ===
- Olayinka Koso-Thomas (born 1937), Nigerian-born doctor established in Sierra Leone
- Olayinka Olajide (born 2002) Nigerian sprinter
- Olayinka Sanni (born 1986), American-Nigerian basketball player
- Olayinka Sule, Nigerian Brigadier-General and administrator of Jigawa State, Nigeria

=== Middle name ===
- Folashade Olayinka Baderinwa (born 1969), American journalist
- Jadesola Olayinka Akande (1940–2008), Nigerian academic
- Olajide Olayinka Williams "JJ" Olatunji (born 1993), known professionally as KSI, English YouTuber, rapper and boxer

=== Surname ===
- Abel Idowu Olayinka (born 1958), Nigerian Professor of Applied geophysics
- Funmilayo Olayinka (1960–2013), Nigerian banker and politician
- Peter Olayinka (born 1995), Nigerian football player
- Segun Olayinka (born 1988), Nigerian cricketer
- Folake Olayinka, Nigerian physician
