= Olaoluwa =

- Gender: Male
- Language: Yoruba

Origin
- Language: Nigeria
- Meaning: "the grace of God" or "the wealth of God
- Region of origin: Southwest

Other names
- Short form: Ola | Laolu | Olaolu

Olaoluwais a Yoruba name given to a male child in the southwestern region of Nigeria. 'Ola', 'Olaolu' and 'Laolu' are the diminutive forms of the name.

== Notable people with the name include ==
- Ebenezar Olaoluwa Fagbemi (born 1984), Nigerian badminton player
- Enoch Olaoluwa Adegoke (born 2000), Nigerian sprinter
- Olaoluwa Abagun (born 1992), Nigerian lawyer and women's rights activist
- Temitayo Olufisayo Olaoluwa Aina (born 1996), Nigerian footballer
- Timothy Olaoluwa Akinola (born 2001), Nigerian footballer
