= Ole Thorben Buschhüter =

German politician (born 1976)

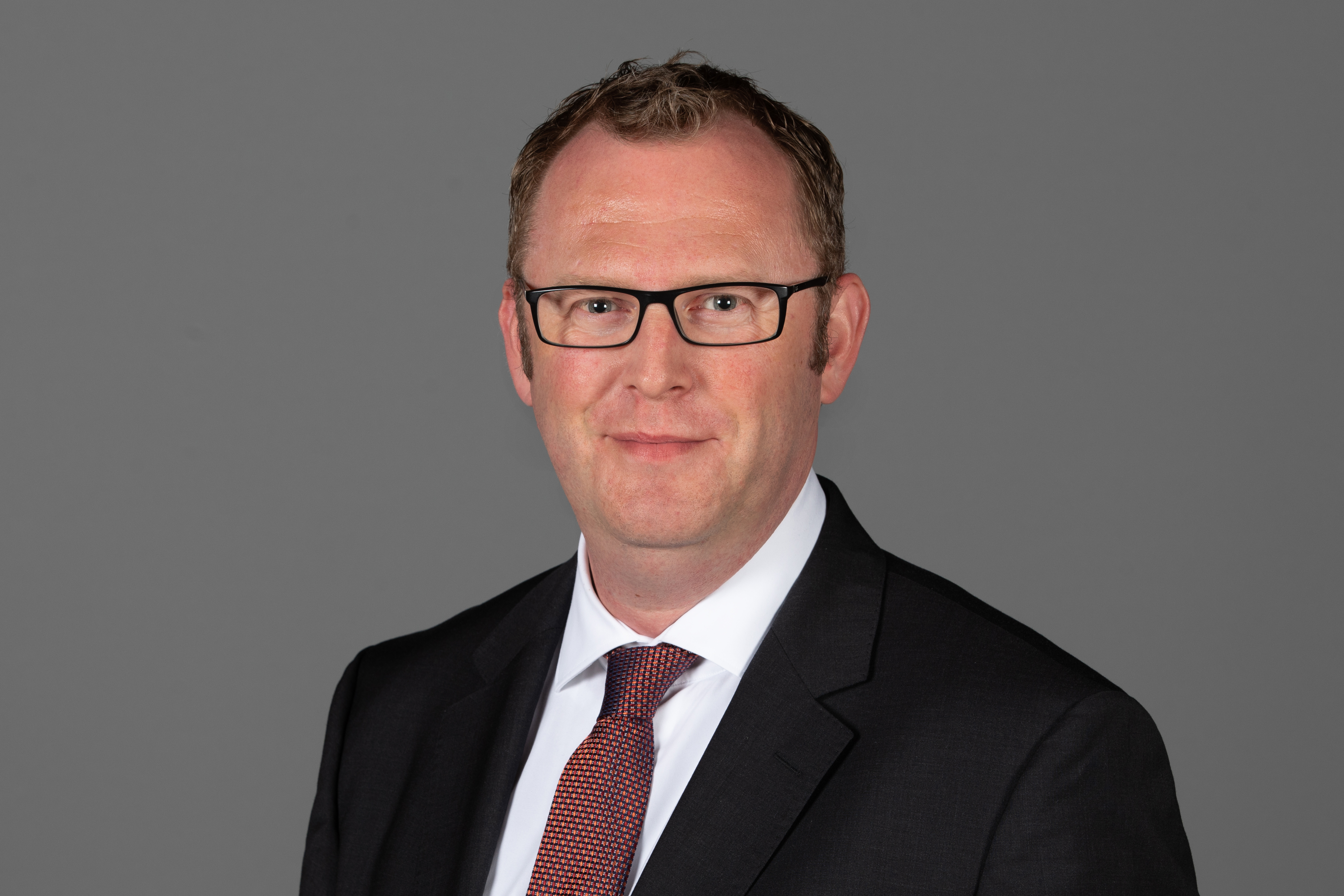
- Buschhüter in 2018

Member of the Hamburg Parliament
- Incumbent
- Assumed office 12 March 2008

Personal details
- Born: 24 January 1976 (age 50) Hamburg
- Party: Social Democratic Party (since 1992)

Ole Thorben Buschhüter (born 24 January 1976 in Hamburg) is a German politician serving as a member of the Hamburg Parliament since 2008. He has served as chief whip of the Social Democratic Party since 2018.
