= Olamide (name) =

- Gender: Unisex
- Language: Yoruba

Origin
- Origin: Nigerian
- Meaning: a combination of prestige, success and wealth has arrived
- Region of origin: Southwest of Nigeria

listen

Ọlámidé is a unisex given name of Yoruba origin meaning "a combination of prestige, success and wealth has arrived".

== Notable people ==
- Olamide Adedeji (born 1989), Nigerian hip hop artist
- Olamide Brown (born 1986), British doctor and businesswoman
- Olamide David (2001–2016), Nigerian child actor
- Olamide Faison (born 1983), American actor and singer
- Olamide Shodipo (born 1997), Irish footballer
- Olamide Zaccheaus (born 1997), American football player
