= 2020 Global Awards =

Awards

- Date: 5 March 2020
- Venue: Hammersmith Apollo
- Country: United Kingdom
- Hosted by: Roman Kemp, Myleene Klass and Rochelle Humes
- Most awards: Lewis Capaldi, Stereophonics (2)
- Most nominations: Ed Sheeran, Lewis Capaldi (4)

Television/radio coverage
- Network: Capital FM; Heart FM; The Capital FM Website; The Heart FM Website

The 2020 Global Awards ceremony was held on Thursday, 5 March 2020 at London's Eventim Apollo and was sponsored by very.co.uk. Roman Kemp and Myleene Klass returned to host the ceremony and were joined by Kate Garraway who replaced Rochelle Humes

== Performances ==
Performances and special appearances included Ellie Goulding, Stereophonics, Camila Cabello, Aitch, Tones and I, Aled Jones and Russell Watson.

== Nominees and winners ==
The list of nominees was announced in January 2020. Ed Sheeran and Lewis Capaldi were the most nominated male singers. The most nominated female singers were Dua Lipa and Camila Cabello.

| Best Song with Metro (Public Vote) | Best Group |
|---|---|
| Harry Styles – "Lights Up"; Pink – "Walk Me Home"; Panic! at the Disco – "High Hopes"; Aitch – "Taste (Make It Shake)"; Billie Eilish – "Bad Guy"; Ed Sheeran & Justin Bieber – "I Don't Care"; Tones and I – "Dance Monkey"; Kygo x Whitney Houston – "Higher Love"; Shawn Mendes & Camila Cabello –"Señorita"; Lewis Capaldi – "Someone You Loved" | Jonas Brothers; Stereophonics; Maroon 5; Coldplay; Little Mix |
| The LBC Award (Public Vote on ceremony day) | Rising Star Award |
| Stuart Outten | Aitch; Young T & Bugsey; Lauv; Tones and I; Lizzo |
| Best Podcast (Public Vote) | Best RnB or Hip Hop or Grime (Public Vote) |
| Sh****ged Married Annoyed; My Dad Wrote a Porno; Off Menu; YouTuber News; The Chris Moyles Show | Stormzy; Post Malone; Khalid; Aitch; Chris Brown |
| Best Male | Best Female |
| Ed Sheeran; Shawn Mendes; Lewis Capaldi; Stormzy; Harry Styles | Camila Cabello; Dua Lipa; Billie Eilish; Ariana Grande; Lizzo |
| Best Classical Artist (public vote) | Best British Act |
| Sheku Kanneh-Mason; MILOŠ; Gareth Malone; Alma Deutscher; Russell Watson | Dua Lipa; Ed Sheeran; Lewis Capaldi; Sam Smith; Stormzy |
| Mass Appeal Award | Most Played Song (shares on during the Award Show) |
| Lewis Capaldi; Ed Sheeran; Tom Walker; Taylor Swift; Freya Ridings | Lewis Capaldi – "Someone You Loved" |
| Best Indie | Best Pop |
| Stereophonics; Sam Fender; The 1975; Twenty One Pilots; Florence and the Machine | Tones and I; Shawn Mendes; Dua Lipa; Jax Jones; Rita Ora |
| The Global Special Award | The Very Award |
| Stereophonics | Andy Smith (co-founder of Regenerate Charity) |

== Multiple awards and nominations ==
- Artists with the most nominations
Four:
- Lewis Capaldi
- Ed Sheeran

Three:

- Shawn Mendes

Two:

- Camila Cabello
- Dua Lipa
- Tones and I

- Artists that received multiple awards

Two:

- Lewis Capaldi
- Stereophonics
