= Ola High School =

Ola High School or OLA High School may refer to:

- Ola High School (Arkansas), closed high school in Ola, Arkansas
- Ola High School (Georgia), high school in McDonough, Georgia
- OLA Girls Senior High School (Ho), high school in Ho, Ghana
- OLA Girls Senior High School (Kenyasi), high school in Kenyasi, Ghana

== See also ==
- Our Lady's Abingdon, a private Catholic school in Oxfordshire, England
