= Olawale =

- Gender: Male
- Language: Yoruba

Origin
- Origin: Nigerian
- Meaning: A combination of prestige, success and wealth has arrived home.

Other names
- Variant form: Ola Wale Olaale (Benin republic/ ketou)

Ọláwálé // is both a surname and a given name of Yoruba origin meaning "a combination of prestige, success and wealth has arrived home". Diminutives of the name include Ola, Wale and Olaale (Benin Republic/Ketou).

== Notable people with the name ==
- Isiaka Olawale (born November 11, 1983), Nigerian footballer
- Jamize Olawale (April 17, 1989), American football player
- Olawale Adeniji Ige (born October 13, 1938 - 9 May 2022), Nigerian engineer and politician
- Olawale Adelusimi (born April 1, 1983), Nigerian footballer
- Taslim Olawale Elias (11 November 1914 – 14 August 1991), Nigerian jurist
