= Ronke Olabisi =

Biomedical engineer

- Born: Ronke Mojoyinola Olabisi; June 26, 1976 (age 50)
- Education: Ph.D. in Biomedical Engineering; Master's in Aerospace Engineering; Master's in Mechanical Engineering; Bachelor's in Mechanical Engineering
- Alma mater: University of Wisconsin-Madison; University of Michigan; Massachusetts Institute of Technology
- Awards: National Space Biomedical Research Institute Postdoctoral Fellowship; National Science Foundation CAREER Award; Johnson & Johnson Women in STEM2D Scholars Award
- Scientific career
- Fields: Tissue engineering Wound healing Regenerative medicine
- Institutions: Rutgers University; UC Irvine
- Website: www.olabisilab.com

Ronke Mojoyinola Olabisi (born 26 June 1976) is an associate professor of biomedical engineering at University of California, Irvine. She works on speciality of bone and human tissue. She is working with Mae Jemison on 100 Year Starship, an interdisciplinary initiative that is exploring the possibility of human interstellar travel.

== Early life and education ==
Olabisi is from Plainfield, New Jersey. She grew up wanting to be an astronaut. Her mentors have been her graduate school and postdoctoral advisors, including Profs. John Taylor, Ray Vanderby, Jr, and Jennifer L. West, as well as individuals not directly involved in her training, such as Mae Jemison. She studied aerospace engineering at Massachusetts Institute of Technology. She moved to the University of Michigan for her Masters research. She completed her doctoral work at University of Wisconsin–Madison. She was awarded the National Science Foundation GSK-12 Award.

== Research and career ==
Olabisi was a postdoctoral researcher at Rice University, where she was awarded a postdoctoral fellowship from the National Space Biomedical Research Institute, and City of Hope National Medical Center. There, she investigated how mother-of-pearl (nacre) gets its natural strength and resilience with the hope to recreate it synthetically, by patterning hydrogels with nacre proteins.

Olabisi's first faculty position was at Rutgers University; today she is an assistant professor at UC Irvine. Her research looks to make wounds heal faster using cell therapy, work that could revolutionize the recovery time of people who require plastic surgery. By combining hydrogels with proteins, cellular repair can occur faster. She is an inventor on a patent describing growing bone using microencapsulated cells releasing bone morphogenetic proteins. She found that she could entrap certain cells into hydrogels to deliver the hormone insulin, which helps to heal diabetic wounds. In 2018 she became a National Science Foundation CAREER Award grant holder, exploring chronic wounds. She is working on combining mesenchymal stem cells and insulin producing cells for dual cell therapies.

She has studied the way that the body adapts to the space environment, in order to identify mechanisms that protect astronauts from the effects of microgravity, by using tissue engineering approaches to stimulate growth, regeneration, and repair.

=== Public engagement ===
Olabisi works with Mae Jemison on the grant project 100 Year Starship, an interdisciplinary initiative that is exploring the technologies necessary to achieve interstellar travel, with the goal that all such technologies would improve life on Earth (e.g., better power sources, clean energy, clothing that doesn't need washing). She presented the program and how it intersected with her work at the European Parliament in 2013. In 2016, she featured in a Vanity Fair and IBM collaboration celebrating women in science. In 2019, she was interviewed by Forbes.
