= Nigerian Society of Chemical Engineers =

- Abbreviation: NSChE
- Formation: 1969
- Legal status: Division of Nigerian Society of Engineers
- Purpose: center of excellence for the Chemical Engineering profession in Africa
- Location: Lagos
- Region served: Nigeria
- Members: 2500
- President: Engr. Anthony Uchechuku Ogbuigwe FNSChE, FNSE, FNAEng, FIChemE
- Main organ: NSChE Journal
- Parent organization: Nigerian Society of Engineers
- Website: nsche.org.ng

The Nigerian Society of Chemical Engineers (NSChE) is an organization for chemical engineers in Nigeria. NSChE was officially inaugurated on 12 March 1969 at a meeting at BP House in Lagos attended by twenty four Chemical Engineers, all trained abroad. In 1999 it became a Division of the Nigerian Society of Engineers. The Society publishes the Nigerian Society of Chemical Engineering Journal.
