= 2022 Global Awards =

Edition of awards show

- Date: 14 April 2022
- Country: United Kingdom
- Most awards: Ed Sheeran (3)
- Most nominations: Anne-Marie, Becky Hill (4)

Television/radio coverage
- Network: Capital FM; Heart FM; The Capital FM Website; The Heart FM Website

The 2022 Global Awards was not held in a physical location due to the ongoing effects of the COVID-19 pandemic in the United Kingdom. Winners were announced through the company's official website and on social network pages on 14 April 2022.

== Nominees and winners ==
The list of nominees was announced on 5 April 2022. The Winners are in Bold.

Best British Act	Best Female
**Ed Sheeran**; Adele; Anne-Marie; Becky Hill; Coldplay; Dave; KSI; Sam Fender; Years & Years	**Anne-Marie**; Adele; Becky Hill; Doja Cat; Mimi Webb; Olivia Rodrigo; Raye
Best Group	Best Male
**Coldplay**; Biffy Clyro; BTS; D-Block Europe; Jonas Brothers; Little Mix	**Ed Sheeran**; Aitch; ArrDee; Dave; Joel Corry; Justin Bieber; Lil Nas X; The Weeknd; Years & Years
Best Mass Appeal	Best Pop Act
**Elton John**; Adele; Anne-Marie; Coldplay; Ed Sheeran	**Justin Bieber**; Anne-Marie; Becky Hill; Joel Corry; Mimi Webb; The Weeknd; Years & Years
Rising Star	Most Played Song 2021
**Mimi Webb**; A1 x J1; ArrDee; Becky Hill; Olivia Rodrigo; Tate McRae; Tom Grennan	**Ed Sheeran - "Bad Habits"**
Best Podcast	Best Classical Act
**My Therapist Ghosted Me**; How To Fail with Elizabeth Day; Rob Beckett and Josh Widdicombe's Parenting Hell; Sh**ged Married Annoyed with Chris & Rosie Ramsey; The High Performance Podcast	**John Williams**; Freddie De Tommaso; Isata Kanneh-Mason; Nicola Benedetti; Sheku Kanneh-Mason
Best Hip Hop or R&B	Best Indie Act
**Dave**; Central Cee; Doja Cat; Russ Millions; Tion Wayne	**Sam Fender**; Biffy Clyro; Florence & the Machine; Foo Fighters; Liam Gallagher; Stereophonics; Wolf Alice
Best Dance Act	Special Award for Creativity
**Diplo**; James Hype; Jodie Harsh; Kah-Lo; MK	**Lil Nas X**
