= Olatunji =

- Gender: Male
- Language: Yoruba

Origin
- Origin: Yorubaland
- Meaning: A combination of prestige, success and wealth reawakened
- Region of origin: Yorubaland [Nigeria, Benin, Togo]

Other names
- Variant forms: Olatoundji (Republic Of Benin); Tunji

Ọlátúnjí is both a surname and a given name of Yoruba origin meaning "nobility/wealth has resurrected, has returned and becomes stronger, is reasserted". The shortform is Tunji.

== Notable people ==
- Olatunji Akin Euba (1935–2020), Nigerian composer, musicologist and pianist
- Ayokunle Olatunji "T. J." Fatinikun (born 1991), Nigerian-American player of American football
- Babatunde Olatunji (1927–2003), Nigerian drummer, educator and social activist
- Dayo Olatunji (born 1992), English singer
- Eddie Olatunji Oshodi (born 1992), English footballer
- Olajide "JJ" Olatunji (born 1993), known as "KSI", English rapper and Internet personality
- Deji Olatunji (born 1996), YouTuber, brother of KSI
- Victor Olatunji (born 1999), Nigerian footballer
- Olatunji Yearwood (born 1985), Trinidadian Soca singer and songwriter

== See also ==
- Olatunji Concert, recording of saxophonist John Coltrane
