= Ola Brown =

British businesswoman (born 1986)

Olamide Brown
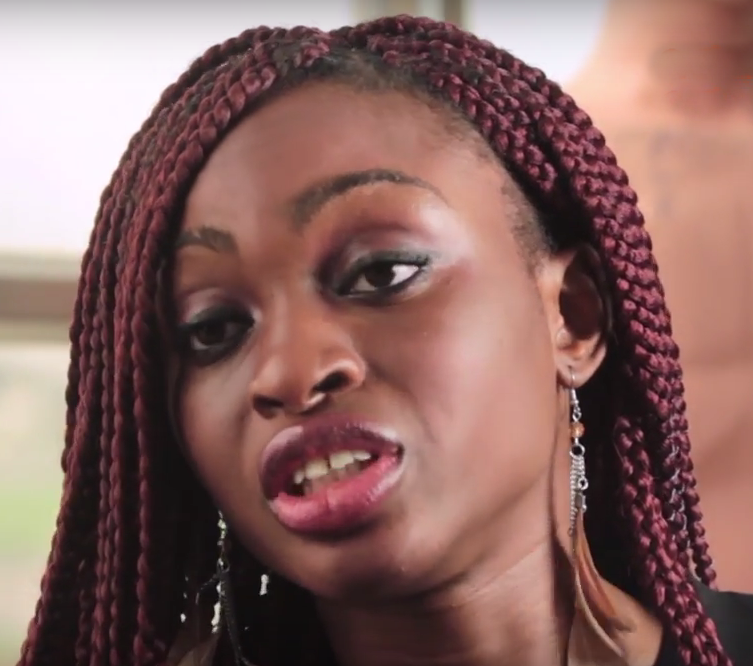
- Born: Olamide Orekunrin; 1986 (age 39–40); London, England
- Education: Hull York Medical School; University of London
- Occupation: Businesswoman
- Spouse: David Brown

Olamide Brown, née Orekunrin (born 1986), is a British-Nigerian medical doctor, healthcare entrepreneur, and founder of the Flying Doctors Healthcare Investment Group and a director of Greentree Investment Company.

== Early life and education ==
Brown was born in London, England. She studied medicine at the Hull York Medical School, a joint programme of the University of Hull and University of York. After graduation, she worked in acute medicine in the UK and then went on to be awarded a Japanese MEXT scholarship, which allowed her to further her studies in Tokyo. The fellowship was focused on lab-based research with induced pluripotent stem cells. She studied for a master's degree in finance and economic policy at the University of London, and also has a certificate in economic policymaking from IE Business School, Spain. In addition, she has a certificate in accounting for decision-making from the University of Michigan in the United States.

== Medical career ==
After graduation, Brown worked for a short period of time in the UK's National Health Service. With her training in aviation medicine, she was the CEO of West Africa's first air-operated emergency medical services in Lagos, Nigeria; Flying Doctors Nigeria Ltd.

She is a member of the American College of Emergency Physicians, and was listed among the 2013 Young Global leaders by the World Economic Forum.

== Flying Doctors ==
Brown started the Flying Doctors after experiencing the loss of her sister and stating that she wants to improve medical services in Nigeria; she established Flying Doctors in Lagos in 2007.

In 2020, a negligence case was instituted against Flying Doctors and Brown by the family of a late patient Nabil Hanga, This suit was later withdrawn by the family. Flying Doctors maintains that Brown works in the area of strategy, marketing and investment.

== Investment and finance ==
In July 2018, Brown, Olabode Agusto and Abasiama Idaresit founded an early-stage venture capital firm called Greentree Investment Company, which provides capital to African technology start-ups. Investments include Paystack, Precurio and Big Cabal Mediain. Brown also hosted Nigeria's Minister of Industry, Trade and Investment, Otunba Adebayo, in the first edition of ‘The Conversation’ with the Flying Doctors Healthcare Investment Company, with discussions centred around investment growth and opportunities in the healthcare sector.

In 2019, she transitioned into broader venture development by founding The Flying Doctors Healthcare Investment Company (FDHIC), an investment firm structured to finance infrastructure and technology across the African healthcare value chain. The entity operates air ambulance services and logistics, while expanding into healthcare public-private partnerships (PPPs).

At the height of the COVID-19 pandemic in Nigeria, Brown and her HealthCa team launched a COVID-19 mobile testing booth, which reduced the need for personal protective equipment.

== Appearances and publications ==
She is a global speaker who has spoken in fora such as the World Economic Forum, TED Global Conference, the Social Media Week Lagos, the European Union, the Swiss Economic Forum, the UN, the World Bank, the World Economic Forum, the Massachusetts Institute of Technology, Cambridge University and the Aspen Ideas Festival.

Brown and her work have been featured on various media platforms. She is also an editor of the International Journal of Emergency Services and has published three books – EMQ's in Paediatrics, Pre-Hospital Care for Africa and Fixing Healthcare in Nigeria; a Guide to Public Healthcare Policy. She has written articles in the British Medical Journal, the Journal of Emergency Medical Services, the Niger Delta Medical Journal, The New York Times, and The Huffington Post.

== Honors ==
Awards and recognition include:

- World Economic Forum (WEF) Young Global Leader.
- Forbes 20 Young Power Women In Africa 2013
- Forbes Africa's 30 Under 30 for 2015
- YWomen – YNaija 100 Most Influential Women in Nigeria 2015
- Silverbird Group Extraordinary Business Achievement Award, 2018 in Lagos, the youngest person ever to win this award.
- YNaija Business Power List 2020
- She was conferred with a National honor - Member of the Order of the Federal Republic (MFR) by President Muhammadu Buhari.
- African Folder Female Founders You Should Know In 2023.
