= Oladele =

- Gender: Male
- Language: Yoruba

Origin
- Origin: Nigeria
- Meaning: a combination of prestige, success and wealth has come home
- Region of origin: Yorubaland

Ọládélé is both a Yoruba given name or surname meaning "a combination of prestige, success and wealth arrives home".

== Notable people with the name include ==
- Solomon Oladele, Nigerian footballer
- Joseph Oladele Sanusi, Nigerian politician
- Oladele Ajose, Nigerian royalty, politician, and health promoter
- Oladele Brendon Ayanbadejo, Nigerian American player of American football
