= Olaoye =

Ọláoyè
- Gender: Male
- Language: Yoruba

Origin
- Origin: Nigerian
- Meaning: The benefit of honour/chieftaincy or the success that came from a title
- Region of origin: Southwestern Nigeria

Ọláoyè audio is a Nigerian given name and a surname. It is a typically a male name and of Yoruba origin, which can mean "the benefit of honour/chieftaincy" or "the success that came from a title".

Ọláoyè is a powerful name with depth and profound meaning. The diminutive form includes Láoyè same meaning but in shorter form with Yoruba phonetic reduction.

== Notable individuals with the name ==
- Abiodun Olaoye, Nigerian Anglican bishop
- David Olaoye (born 1996), English footballer of Nigerian descent
- Dele Olaoye (born 1982), Nigerian footballer
