= Oladapo =

Male given name

- Language: Yoruba

Origin
- Meaning: Wealth has been mixed together
- Region of origin: Nigeria

Other names
- Variant forms: Ọládàpọ̀ Ládàpọ̀ Dàpọ̀

Ọládàpọ̀ (alternatively spelled Ladapo) is a Nigerian given name of Yoruba origin meaning "a combination of prestige, success and wealth has been mixed together (alike)".

== People with Oladapo as first/given name ==
- D'banj Nigerian musician
- Oladapo Afolabi (born 3 October 1953), former Nigerian academic.
- Oladapo Fagbenle, British entrepreneur, music video producer, director, and former NCAA athlete.
- Oladapo Olufemi (born 5 November 1988), Nigerian footballer.
- Da Grin born Oladapo Olaitan Olaonipekun (21 October 1987 – 22 April 2010), award-winning Nigerian rapper.
- Oba Ladapo Ademola II (1872–1962), Alake of Abeokuta
- Oladapo Afolayan (born 11 September 1997), Enlglish footballer.

== People with Oladapo as middle name ==
- Brian Oladapo Idowu (Russian: Брайан Оладапо Идову; born 18 May 1992), Russian professional football player of Nigerian origin.
- Hosea Oladapo Ehinlanwo (born 2 August 1938), Nigerian Senator for the Ondo South constituency of Ondo State, Nigeria.

== People with Oladapo as last/family name ==
- Freddie Ladapo, British athlete
- Adebayo Oladapo, Nigerian athlete.
- Georgina Oladapo, British athlete.
- Ifedayo Oladapo, (1932 - 2010) Nigerian engineer, former academic at the University of Lagos.
- Joyce Oladapo née Hepher (born 11 February 1964), retired British long jumper.
- Kitan Oladapo (born 2000), American football player
- Olatubosun Oladapo also known as Tubosun Oladapo and Odidere Aiyekooto (September 1943), Nigerian folk poet.
