= Folake Olayinka =

- Occupation: Medical Doctor Health Worker Project Director

Folake Olayinka is a physician and global health leader. Since October 2020, she has served as the United States Agency for International Development's (USAID) Global Immunization lead/STAR Fellow. She also served as Technical and Strategy lead for the COVID19 Vaccine Access and Delivery Initiative Washington DC, United States.

Prior to joining USAID Washington, she worked with JSI Arlington VA, USA from August 2015 to October 2020 as the Project Director of MOMENTUM Routine Immunization Transformation and Equity (MRITE). She was also the Senior Immunization Advisor and Immunization Center Senior Leadership team member and Global Immunization Team Leader USAID's Flagship Maternal Child Survival Program aimed at ending preventable maternal and child deaths.

She has been the Program Director of Support to National Malaria Program,(SuNMAP) a UKAID funded project supporting Nigeria's National Malaria Control Program and to provide comprehensive malaria control technical assistance, led by Malaria Consortium.

She is a member of WHO's Strategic Advisory Group of Experts (SAGE) and also serves on the SAGE working Group on COVID-19 vaccines. From 2010 to 2014, she was a member of WHO Immunization Practice Advisory Committee (IPAC). She serves on the WHO African Regional Immunization Technical Advisory Group (RITAG) and is a scientific advisor for the African Leadership Initiative for Vaccinology Expertise, University of the Witwatersrand, South Africa.

Some of her works are in routine immunization, polio eradication, maternal and child health (MCH), HIV and malaria programs.

She is an ASPEN New Voice Fellow and Fellow of the WomenLift Health Leadership program Stanford University USA.
