= 2023 Global Awards =

Edition of award ceremony

- Date: 31 March 2023
- Country: United Kingdom

Television/radio coverage
- Network: Capital FM; Capital XTRA; Heart FM; Radio X Smooth Radio

The 2023 Global Awards ceremony were held on 31 March 2023 live on-air through the Global radio stations Capital FM, Capital XTRA, Heart FM, Radio X and Smooth Radio.

== Nominees and winners ==
The list of nominees was announced in March 2023 through the Global networks. All nominees are listed below, and the winners are listed in bold.

Best Song	Most Played Song
**Harry Styles** **– "As It Was"**; Aitch, Ashanti – "Baby"; Beyoncé – "Break My Soul"; Fireboy DML, Ed Sheeran – "Peru"; George Ezra – "Green Green Grass"; Harry Styles – "Late Night Talking"; The Kid Laroi, Justin Bieber – "Stay"; Lewis Capaldi – "Forget Me"; Lizzo – "About Damn Time"; Lizzo – "2 Be Loved (Am I Ready)"; Meghan Trainor – "Made You Look"; Mimi Webb – "House on Fire"; Raye, 070 Shake – "Escapism"; Sam Smith, Kim Petras – "Unholy"; Taylor Swift – "Anti-Hero"	**Jax Jones, MNEK - "Where Did You Go?"**
Best Social Trended Song	Rising Star Award
**Raye, 070 Shake – "Escapism"**; Ch!pz – "1001 Arabian Nights"; David Guetta, Bebe Rexha - "I'm Good (Blue)"; Joji – "Glimpse Of Us"; Jvke – "Golden Hour"; Meghan Trainor – "Made You Look"; Miguel – "Sure Thing"; Nicky Youre, Dazy - "Sunroof"; Rema, Selena Gomez – "Calm Down"; Steve Lacy – "Bad Habit"; SZA – "Kill Bill"	**Flo**; Bru-c; Jvke; Lf System; Pinkpantheress; Sam Ryder; Wet Leg
Mass Appeal Award	Best Group
**Lewis Capaldi**; Beyoncé; Coldplay; Elton John; George Ezra; Harry Styles; Pink	**Coldplay**; Arctic Monkeys; D-Block Europe; Florence and the Machine; Muse; Red Hot Chili Peppers; Wet Leg
Best Male	Best Female
**Harry Styles**; Aitch; Calvin Harris; George Ezra; Ksi; Lewis Capaldi; Liam Gallagher; Sam Fender; Stormzy; Tom Grennan	**Lizzo**; Anne-Marie; Becky Hill; Beyoncé; Meghan Trainor; Mimi Webb; Pink; Raye; Sza; Taylor Swift
Best Classical Artist	Best British Act
**udi**; **Ludovico Einaudi**; Abel Selaocoe; Alison Balsom; Isata Kanneh-Mason; Lang Lang; Nicola Benedetti; Sheku Kanneh-Mason	**Harry Styles**; Aitch; Anne-Marie; Becky Hill; Calvin Harris; Joel Corry; Lewis Capaldi; Mimi Webb; Raye; Sam Fender; Sam Smith; Stormzy; Tom Grennan
Best RnB or Hip Hop	Best Dance
**Central Cee**; Aitch; Arrdee; Beyoncé; Burna Boy; D-block Europe; Dave; Doja Cat; Drake; Fireboy Dml; Flo; Raye; Stormzy	**Fred Again**; Bru-c; David Guetta; Eliza Rose; Lf System; Luude; Pinkpantheress; The Blessed Madonna; Tiësto
Best Indie	Best Podcast
**Wet Leg**; Arctic Monkeys; Blink-182; Florence + The Machine; Kasabian; Liam Gallagher; Noel Gallagher’s High Flying Birds; Red Hot Chili Peppers; Sam Fender	**The News Agents**; My Therapist Ghosted Me; That Peter Crouch Podcast; The Rest Is Politics; The Wittering Whitehalls
