= Capital TV =

British music-oriented television channel

- Country: United Kingdom

Ownership
- Owner: Global
- Sister channels: Heart TV

History
- Launched: 11 October 2012; 13 years ago
- Closed: 11 October 2018; 7 years ago

Capital TV was a British music-oriented television channel owned by Global as a visual brand extension of the Capital radio station network. It launched on October 11, 2012, along with Heart TV. The channel played current chart hits of the decade and targeted an 18-34 demographic.

Capital TV was only allowed to play two or three commercial breaks each hour, each lasting 5 minutes long, which was also the case for its sister channel Heart TV.

== History ==
On 3 July 2012, Global announced it would launch a TV channel based on the Capital radio networks. On 24 July 2012 it was confirmed BSkyB would be responsible for ad sales on both channels, likewise with the radio station, Capital TV was aimed at a younger target audience.

The station launched on Sky and Freesat platforms on 11 October 2012 at 11:00 p.m., along with a TV channel of the same name for sister radio station Heart. The channels could also be watched via dedicated iOS apps, as well as online. On 17 October 2012, Capital TV also launched on Freeview in Manchester. Both channels played non-stop music videos 24 hours a day, 7 days a week and also featured some exclusive content, such as the Jingle Bell Ball.

The channel was not related to the former restricted television service licence channel of the same name, which ran in Cardiff between 2005 and 2008.

== Closure ==
As part of a brand restructuring, Capital TV was removed from Freesat on 10 October 2018, and on Sky the next day, along with Heart TV, and all mentions of it later disappeared from the Capital FM website, therefore ending both channels' runs. The first music video aired on the channel was "Let Me Love You (Until You Learn to Love Yourself)" by Ne-Yo and the last music video was "Thunderclouds" by Labrinth, Sia and Diplo, before transitioning to the network's ident and freezing for a few minutes. Then, after a while, the network showed a few minutes of "Havana" by Camila Cabello featuring Young Thug before freezing halfway through the video, making the channel cease transmission at 6 AM.
