= Heart TV =

- Country: United Kingdom

Ownership
- Owner: Global
- Sister channels: Capital TV

History
- Launched: 11 October 2012; 14 years ago
- Closed: 11 October 2018; 8 years ago

Heart TV (stylized as 'heartv') was a British 24-hour pop music television channel owned by Global as a brand extension of radio's Heart network. The channel played music videos from the 1970s, 1980s, 1990s, 2000s and 2010s (including romantic music and film scores).

It reached 927,000 viewers on average per month on Sky alone.

== History ==
On 3 July 2012, Global announced it would launch a TV channel of the same name, Heart. The station launched on Sky and Freesat platforms on 11 October 2012 at 11:00 p.m. (this was postponed twice), along with a TV channel of the same name for sister radio station Capital. The channels could also be watched via dedicated iOS and Android apps, as well as online. Both channels played non-stop music videos 24 hours a day, 7 days a week and also featured live coverage for major musical events across the UK. On 24 July 2012 it was confirmed BSkyB would be responsible for ad sales on both channels, likewise with the radio station, Heart TV was aimed at a target audience of housewives with children.

In February 2015, Global were reprimanded by the media regulator Ofcom following an incident in October 2014 during which Heart TV played 72 seconds more than the permitted amount of advertising during one particular hour. Global said the incident had occurred because a commercial break was pushed to the end of an hour by software controlling its output, creating too much advertising time for the following hour.

The channel originally aimed to play “More Music Variety” (similar to the radio), however, after the slogan was changed in February 2017 to “Turn Up the Feel Good!”.

From 2015 to 2017, Heart TV was rebranded temporarily as Heart Xmas playing nothing but Christmas music. In Summer 2016 and 2017, Heart TV was rebranded temporarily as Heart Summer.

== Closure ==
As part of a brand restructuring, Heart TV was removed from Freesat on 10 October 2018, and on Sky the next day, along with its sister channel Capital TV, and all mentions of it have disappeared from the Heart website, therefore ending both channels' runs. The first music video aired on the channel was “My Kind of Love” by Emeli Sandé and the last music video was "Locked Out of Heaven" by Bruno Mars before the channel ceased at 6am. A channel similar to the defunct channel, That's Fabulous, launched in September 2024 but was closed in January 2025.
