= Remedied =

2026 single by Flo

Single by Flo

from the album Therapy at the Club
- Released: 24 July 2026
- Genre: R&B; pop
- Length: 2:08
- Label: EMI
- Songwriters: Jorja Douglas; Oscar Linnander; Jayme Silverstein; Amy Allen; Warren Felder
- Producers: Oscar Linnander; Jayme Silverstein; Oak

Flo singles chronology
"Don't Break Her Heart" (2026)	"Remedied" (2026)	"Leave You (Never)" (2026)

Music video
- "Remedied" on YouTube

"Remedied" is a song recorded by British girl group Flo. It was released on 24 July 2026 through EMI Records as the third single from the group's second studio album, Therapy at the Club (2026). Member Jorja Douglas co-wrote the song alongside Amy Allen, Oscar Linnander, Jayme Silverstein and Warren Felder. The latter three also handled the production of the track.

The lyrical content of "Remedied" revolves around going on a night out with friends after feeling down emotionally. Flo sing about how a night out with music, friends and dancing in a nightclub makes them forget about their problems and feel better. It was accompanied by a music video directed by Jake Nava, Sienna Nava and Marlon Cang, which serves as a prequel to the music video for lead single "Leak It". A mixture between the R&B and pop genres, "Remedied" was compared to Christina Aguilera's "Ain't No Other Man" and Raye's "Where Is My Husband!".

== Background and release ==
In March 2026, Flo released "Leak It" as the lead single from their second studio album, Therapy at the Club (2026). It was followed by the release of "Therapy at the Club", a promotional single and the titular track from the album, as well as the second official single, "Don't Break Her Heart". Flo began teasing "Remedied" in an advertisement for Liquid I.V, a company that sells electrolytes for rehydration. It was eventually released on 24 July 2026. "Remedied" was initially slated to be released alongside the rest of the album on 24 July, but Therapy at the Club's release was postponed by two weeks due to member Jorja Douglas requiring a precautionary procedure on her vocal cords. "Remedied" was instead released as a single on 24 July to tide fans over.

== Composition and lyrics ==
"Remedied" was written by Flo member Jorja Douglas alongside Amy Allen, Oscar Linnander, Jayme Silverstein and Warren Felder. Linnander, Silverstein and Felder also produced the track. It has been described both an R&B and a pop song. Speaking about the song, Flo stated it is "for anyone who's been stuck in a rut, it's that moment you finally get up, get out, and remember who you are. Consider it your cure."

Its lyrical content continues the theme shown in previous releases from Therapy at the Club; seeking healing in the club after a relationship has turned sour. In "Remedied", Flo sing about feeling down until receiving a call from their friend to invite them on a night out where they can forget about their pain. The lyrics also dissect the antics of the night out, including drinking too much and "being on the verge of getting blackout drunk", but enjoying the nightlife, music and friends since it made everything feel alright.

== Music video ==
An accompanying music video for "Remedied" premiered the week following the release of the song. It was directed by Jake Nava, Sienna Nava and Marlon Cang. The video follows Flo in a tumultuous search for stardom and ultimately deciding to instead have a good time with each other. The video ends with a cameo from the head of "the Retreat", linking it as the prequel to the music video for "Leak It".

== Critical reception ==
Critics praised "Remedied", as well as noting that the song had quickly become a fan-favourite. It was compared to Christina Aguilera's "Ain't No Other Man", as well as Raye's "Where Is My Husband!".

== Credits and personnel ==
Credits adapted from Spotify.

- Jorja Douglas – vocals, songwriting
- Renée Downer – vocals
- Stella Quaresma – vocals
- Oscar Linnander – songwriting, production, recording engineer, guitar
- Jayme Silverstein – songwriting, production, guitar, bass, keyboard
- Amy Allen – songwriting
- Oak – songwriting, production, recording and vocal engineer, programming, bass, drums, keyboard
- Sean McNamara – recording and vocal engineer
- Charlie Holmes – mixing engineer
- Matt J Barnes – second mixing engineer
- Simon Francis – mastering engineer

== Charts ==
Chart performance
Chart (2026)	Peak position
New Zealand Hot Singles (RMNZ)	36

== Release history ==
Region	Date	Format	Label	Ref.
Various	24 July 2026	Digital download; streaming	EMI	
