= Steph Jones =

American songwriter (born 1987)

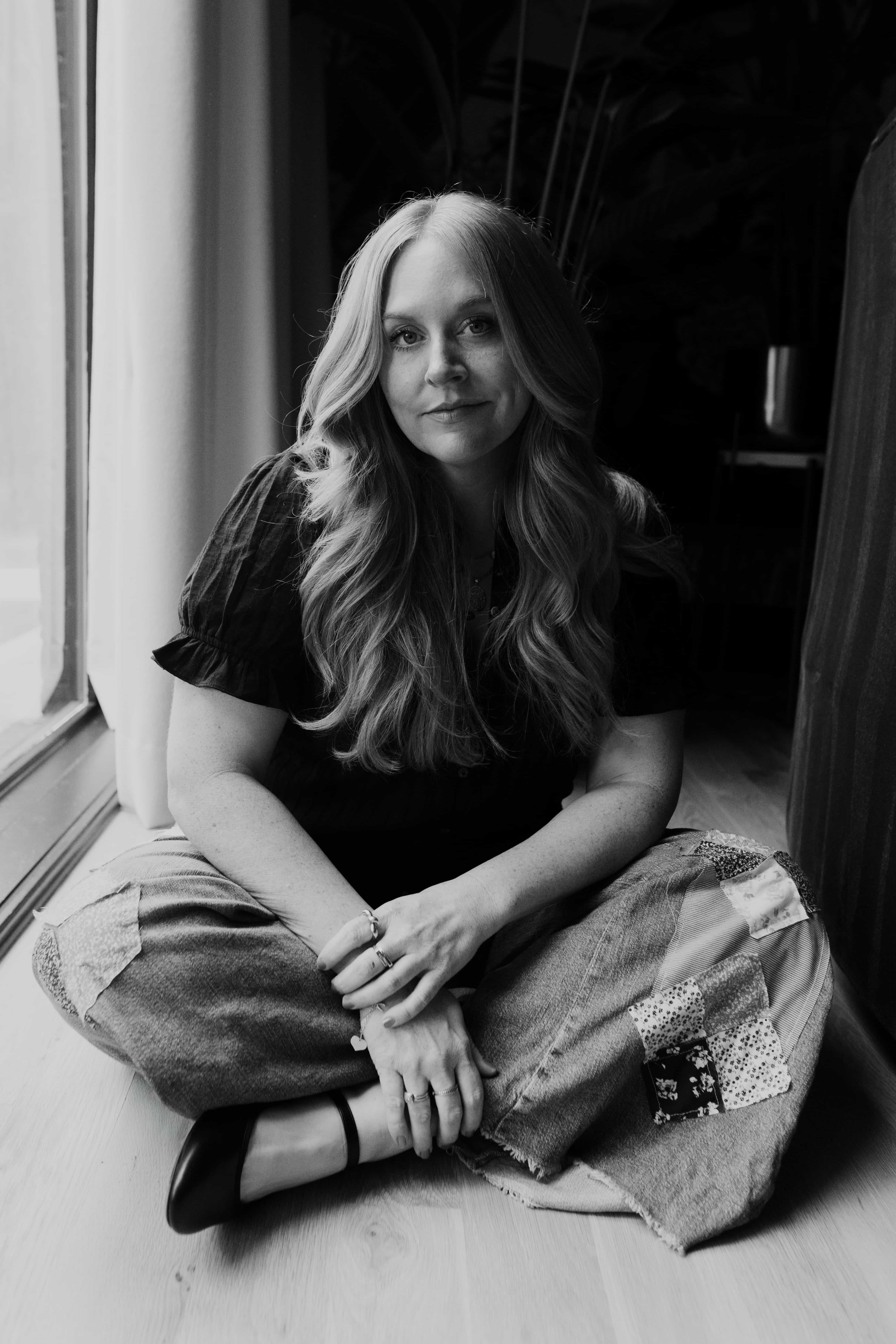

Background information
- Born: Stephenie Nicole Jones; September 6, 1987 (age 38)
- Genres: Pop; alternative; pop rock; songwriter; country; K-pop; folk music; Americana
- Occupation: Songwriter
- Instruments: Vocals; piano; guitar
- Years active: 2012–present

Stephenie Nicole Jones (born September 6, 1987) is an American songwriter and vocal producer based in Nashville, TN. She has written songs performed by artists including Sabrina Carpenter, Selena Gomez, Blackpink, Demi Lovato, Kelsea Ballerini, Jade Thirlwall, Florence and the Machine, Celine Dion, Keith Urban, Teddy Swims, Madi Diaz, and more.

== Career ==
Steph Jones co-wrote Sabrina Carpenter's 5× platinum song "Espresso", the lead single from her sixth studio album, Short n' Sweet, alongside co-writers Amy Allen and Julian Bunetta. "Espresso" is nominated for both Record of the Year and Best Pop Solo Performance at the 2025 Grammy's and is Spotify's 3rd fastest song to hit 1 Billion streams. It was Billboard's #1 Global Song of the Summer for 2024, as well as reaching #1 on Pop Airplay and #3 on the Hot 100 Charts. Steph Jones has co-written with Sabrina Carpenter over many albums, including songs "Nonsense", "Bet U Wanna", "Bad for Business" and "Things I Wish You Said" from Carpenter's fifth studio album, Emails I Can't Send, as well as "Sue Me", "Buy Me Presents", "Let Me Move You" (from the Netflix film Work It), and more.

Jones also co-wrote Jade Thirwall's debut single "Angel Of My Dreams" which charted Top 10 on UK Singles Chart. Other notable works include Selena Gomez's "People You Know", BLACKPINK's "Love to Hate Me", Amber Mark's "Competition," Latto ft LU KALA "Lottery", Teddy Swims "Growing Up is Getting Old", and "Call Me Cruella" by Florence + The Machine (for Disney's GRAMMY-nominated Original Motion Picture soundtrack ‘Cruella’).

Jones has also had success as a songwriter in the country music space, with Kelsea Ballerini's #1 Country Radio song "Hole In The Bottle", Tenille Townes "When's It Gonna Happen" and "Girl Who Didn't Care," Little Big Town's "Over Drinking" (from their GRAMMY-nominated album ‘Nightfall’), Keith Urban's "Polaroid," as well as Shania Twain and BRELAND's "Boots Don't" (from Twisters: The Album).

== Songwriting discography ==
Year	Artist	Album	Song
2012	Evermore	Follow The Sun	"Hero"
2014	Cole Plante, Myon & Shane 54, Ruby O'Dell	If I Fall	"If I Fall"
2015	Julie Bergan	All Hours	"All Hours"
2015	Kevin Rudolf	That Other Ship	"That Other Ship"
2015	Ryan Lafferty	The Half of It	"Stalemate"
2015	Matthew Mayfield, Chelsea Lankes	Wild Eyes	"Why We Try (feat. Chelsea Lankes)"
2015	Who Is Fancy	Goodbye	"Goodbye"
2015	Juliet Simms	All or Nothing	"All or Nothing"
2016	Sabrina Carpenter	EVOLution	"Don't Want It Back"
2016	Sabrina Carpenter	EVOLution	"Shadows"
2016	Paulina Jayne	Paulina Jayne	"Tidal Wave"
2016	Tritonal, Steph Jones	Painting With Dreams	"Blackout"
2016	Tritonal, Steph Jones	Painting With Dreams	"Escape"
2016	Felix Cartal, Steph Jones	Keep Up	"Keep Up"
2016	Olivia Holt, Jordan Fisher	Olivia	"Thin Air"
2016	Chris Lane, MacKenzie Porter	Girl Problems	"Circles"
2016	Forever in Your Mind	FIYM	"Whistle"
2016	Jason Owen	Proud	"Good Night"
2016	Julie Bergan	I Kinda Like It	"I Kinda Like It"
2016	Chuck Wicks	Turning Point	"Tell Me"
2016	Star Darlings	Up	"Up"
2017	Kim Viera	Pitch Perfect 3 (Original Motion Picture Soundtrack)	"Tribe"
2017	Danielle Bradbery	I Don't Believe We've Met	"Can't Stay Mad"
2017	Jacob Sartorius	Cozy	"Cozy"
2017	Jane XØ, LöKii	Let Me Down Easy	"Let Me Down Easy"
2017	Grey, Asia	Chameleon	"Chameleon"
2017	Emily Hackett	Nostalgia	"Nostalgia"
2017	Niki & Gabi	R U	"R U"
2017	Dylan Scott	Dylan Scott (Deluxe Edition)	"Rules"
2017	Nickelback	Feed The Machine	"Song on Fire"
2017	Aliyah Moulden	The Complete Season 12 Collection (The Voice Performance)	"Never Be Lonely - The Voice Performance"
2017	Mike Williams, Brezy	Don't Hurt (feat. Brezy)	"Don't Hurt (feat. Brezy)"
2017	Sweater Beats, R.LUM.R	Altar (feat. R.LUM.R)	"Altar (feat. R.LUM.R)"
2017	James Blunt	The Afterlove	"Bartender"
2017	Julian Jordan, Sj	Say Love	"Say Love"
2017	Adam Brand	Get On Your Feet	"Rent Money"
2018	Sabrina Carpenter	Singular Act I	"Almost Love"
2018	Sabrina Carpenter	Singular Act I	"Sue Me"
2018	Carlie Hanson	Toxins	"Toxins"
2018	Against The Current	Past Lives	"Almost Forgot"
2018	Nashville Cast, Jenny Leigh	Nashville, Season 6: Episode 16 (Music from the Original TV Series)	"All That Matters"
2018	Panic! At The Disco	Pray for the Wicked	"Roaring 20s"
2018	morgxn	vital	"roots"
2018	Missy Higgins	Solastalgia	"Cemetery"
2018	PRETTYMUCH	PRETTYMUCH an EP	"Hello"
2018	Rich Edwards, Victoria Voss	Ego	"Ego"
2018	Bea Miller	aurora	"bored"
2018	Bea Miller	aurora	"burning bridges"
2018	Bea Miller	aurora	"buy me diamonds"
2018	Bea Miller	aurora	"S.L.U.T."
2018	Bea Miller, mike.	aurora	"to the grave"
2018	FRENSHIP	LOVE Somebody	"LOVE Somebody"
2019	Katemale	Out Of Touch	"Out Of Touch"
2019	Céline Dion	Courage (Deluxe Edition)	"Look at Us Now"
2019	bülow, Jimi Somewhere	The Contender	"Puppy Love"
2019	JOSEPH	Good Luck, Kid	"In My Head"
2019	Annika Rose	In the End	"In the End"
2019	AJ Mitchell	Slow Dance	"Out My Mind"
2019	Sabrina Carpenter	Singular Act II	"In My Bed"
2019	Sabrina Carpenter	Singular Act II	"Take Off All Your Cool"
2019	Alle Farben, Jordan Powers	Sticker on My Suitcase	"Different for Us"
2019	Carlie Hanson	Junk	"WYA"
2019	Carlie Hanson	Junk	"Back in My Arms"
2019	P!nk	Hurts 2B Human	"Happy"
2019	MacKenzie Porter	Cry Baby	"Cry Baby"
2019	Gia Woods	New Girlfriend	"New Girlfriend"
2019	Jack & Jack	A Good Friend Is Nice	"Used To You Now"
2019	Quinn Lewis	Hanging On	"Hanging On"
2020	Jackie Schimmel	BITCH	"BITCH"
2020	Emily Weisband	Not Afraid to Say Goodbye	"You're Cool"
2020	Kelsea Ballerini	Hole In The Bottle feat. Shania Twain	"Hole In The Bottle feat. Shania Twain"
2020	John K	love + everything else	"if we never met"
2020	John K, Kelsea Ballerini	love + everything else	"if we never met (feat. Kelsea Ballerini)"
2020	Carlie Hanson	DestroyDestroyDestroyDestroy	"Is That a Thing?"
2020	Sarah Reeves	Life Love & Madness	"Don't Feel Like Fighting"
2020	BLACKPINK	THE ALBUM	"Love To Hate Me"
2020	Keith Urban	THE SPEED OF NOW Part 1	"Polaroid"
2020	Now United	Nobody Fools Me Twice	"Nobody Fools Me Twice"
2020	Lindsay Ell	heart theory	"wrong girl"
2020	Sabrina Carpenter	Let Me Move You (From the Netflix film Work It)	"Let Me Move You - From the Netflix film Work It"
2020	Maisie Peters	Sad Girl Summer	"Sad Girl Summer"
2020	MAYCE	Cry For Help	"L.O.V.E."
2020	GAMPER & DADONI, Dewain Whitmore	Perfect (For Somebody Else)	"Perfect (For Somebody Else)"
2020	Kelsea Ballerini	kelsea	"hole in the bottle"
2020	Kelsea Ballerini	kelsea	"the way i used to"
2020	Sj,Katelyn Tarver	Heaven	"Heaven"
2020	John K, Sigala	if we never met (remix)	"if we never met - remix"
2020	Little Big Town	Nightfall	"Over Drinking"
2020	Selena Gomez	Rare	"People You Know"
2021	Monsta X	The Dreaming	"Tied to Your Body"
2021	Jorge Blanco	Bad Karma	"Bad Karma"
2021	Ross Copperman & Cam	Everything Changes	"Everything Changes"
2021	Wrabel ft. Madi Diaz	these words are all for you	"It's Us"
2021	Madi Diaz	History Of A Feeling	"Man In Me"
2021	Johnny Orlando	Daydream	"Daydream"
2021	Charlie Hickey & MUNA	Seeing Things (Muna's Version)	"Seeing Things (Muna's Version)"
2021	ZHU ft. John The Blind	Monster	"Monster"
2021	ILLENIUM, Matt Maeson	Fallen Embers	"Heavenly Side"
2021	Amber Mark	Competition (Snakehips Remix)	"Competition (Snakehips Remix)"
2021	Emily Weisband	Butterfly (ft Karen Fairchild)	"Butterfly (ft Karen Fairchild)"
2021	Tenille Townes	Girl Who Didn't Care	"Girl Who Didn't Care"
2021	Amber Mark	Competition	"Competition - Single Edit"
2021	chloe moriondo	Blood Bunny	"Bodybag"
2021	chloe moriondo	Blood Bunny	"I Eat Boys"
2021	chloe moriondo	Blood Bunny	"What If It Doesn't End Well"
2021	Sweet Little Band	Babies Go Charlie Puth	"Is It Just Me?"
2021	Emily Weisband	I Call It Being Human	"Indie Movie Zoomout Moment"
2021	John K, ROSIE	ilym (feat. ROSIE)	"ilym (feat. ROSIE)"
2021	Babygirl	Nevermind	"Nevermind"
2021	Sheppard	Kaleidoscope Eyes	"Catalina"
2021	SG Lewis	times	"Chemicals"
2021	Lindsey Ray	Metamorphosis	"There’s Nothing Like This"
2021	Mimi Webb	Reasons	"Reasons"
2022	Sabrina Carpenter	A Nonsense Christmas	"A Nonsense Christmas"
2022	John K	Be Alright // U Sometimes	"U Sometimes"
2022	Mickey Guyton	I Still Pray	"I Still Pray"
2022	Teddy Swims	Sleep is Exhausting	"The Plan"
2022	Ella Jane	Marginalia	"Warhol"
2022	Ella Jane	Marginalia	"Party Trick"
2022	Ashe	Rae	"Angry Woman"
2022	Ashe	Rae	"Emotional"
2022	Ashe	Rae	"Fun While It Lasted"
2022	Ashe	Rae	"omw"
2022	Ashe ft. Diane Keaton	Rae	"Love Is Letting Go"
2022	chloe moriondo	SUCKERPUNCH	"Cry"
2022	chloe moriondo	SUCKERPUNCH	"Plastic Purse"
2022	Surf Mesa, Nat Dunn	State Of My Heart	"State Of My Heart"
2022	ill peach	BRIGHT LIGHTS	"BRIGHT LIGHTS"
2022	Meet Me At The Altar	Past // Present // Future	"Say It (To My Face)"
2022	Valencia Grace	There I Said It	"There I Said It"
2022	GUNNAR	old shit	"She's In My Head"
2022	Dara Reneé, Disney	High School Musical: The Musical: The Series (Original Soundtrack/Season 3)	"Here I Come"
2022	John K	something worth working on	"something worth working on"
2022	John K	Guitars and Drugs	"Guitars and Drugs"
2022	Brooke Eden	Choosing You	"Knock"
2022	Josh Gracin	History Repeats	"History Repeats"
2022	Sabrina Carpenter	emails i can't send	"Bad for Business"
2022	Sabrina Carpenter	emails i can't send	"bet u wanna"
2022	Sabrina Carpenter	emails i can't send	"Nonsense"
2022	renforshort	dear amelia	"better off"
2022	August Ponthier	Shaking Hands With Elvis	"Shaking Hands With Elvis"
2022	Ella Mai	Heart On My Sleeve	"Feels Like"
2022	JOHN K, Sigala	A LOT ( Remix)	"A LOT (Sigala Remix)"
2022	Ingrid Andress	Good Person	"Good Person"
2022	Francis Karel	Like All My Friends	"Like All My Friends"
2022	Sofia Carson	Sofia Carson	"Stay"
2022	Ella Henderson	Everything I Didn’t Say	"Sorry That I Miss You"
2022	MILKBLOOD	NO MIND	"NO MIND"
2022	Jason Mraz	Mystical Magical Rhythmical Radical Ride	"I Feel Like Dancing"
2022	Florence + The Machine	Harder Than Hell	"Call me Cruella - From Cruella/Soundtrack Version"
2022	Amber Mark	Three Dimensions Deep	"Bliss"
2022	Amber Mark	Three Dimensions Deep	"Bubbles"
2022	John K	A LOT	"A LOT"
2022	Tenille Townes	Masquerades	"When's It Gonna Happen"
2023	Sabrina Carpenter	fruitcake	"buy me presents"
2023	Jake Scott	Lavender	"One On The Way"
2023	Lauren Spencer Smith	Mirror (Deluxe)	"Sad Forever"
2023	Madi Diaz	Weird Faith	"Same Risk"
2023	Kate Micucci	My Hat	"Bucket of Beans"
2023	Suriel Hess	Hair	"Hair"
2023	Madeline The Person	CHAPTER 4: The End	"Watercolor Flowers"
2023	SNOW WIFE	QUEEN DEGENERATE	"HIT IT (feat. Big Boss Vette)"
2023	Teddy Swims	I've Tried Everything But Therapy (Part 1)	"Flame"
2023	ella jane	Dead Weight	"Dead Weight"
2023	Ryan Griffin	Phases	"God Made Fridays"
2023	Lyn Lapid	to love in the 21st century	"ok with it"
2023	Lyn Lapid	to love in the 21st century	"tlit21c"
2023	Bishop Briggs	Baggage	"Baggage"
2023	Michelle Zarlenga	Shimmering Seas (From Disney Cruise Line/25th Anniversary Theme)	"Shimmering Seas - From Disney Cruise Line/25th Anniversary Theme"
2023	Mike Sabath	Being Human	"Hers"
2023	Mike Sabath, The Moongirls	Being Human	"Pillows"
2023	ella jane, Charlie Hickey	Marginalia (Deluxe)	"Sore Loser"
2023	Sabrina Carpenter, Coi Leray	Nonsense (Remix)	"Nonsense (with Coi Leray)"
2023	Sabrina Carpenter	emails i can’t send fwd:	"things i wish you said"
2023	Meet Me At The Altar	Past // Present // Future	"It's Over For Me"
2023	ill peach	THIS IS NOT AN EXIT	"HEAVYWEIGHT"
2023	Meet Me At The Altar	Past // Present // Future	"Kööl"
2023	lennnie	songs to send to someone you love	"I Love You x a Million"
2023	Latto,LU KALA	Lottery (feat. LU KALA)	"Lottery (feat. LU KALA)"
2023	CXLOE	Shiny New Thing	"Cheating on Myself"
2024	Amber Mark	Loosies	"Wait So Yeah"
2024	Myles Smith	A Minute...	"3am"
2024	Myles Smith, James Bay	A Minute...	"Waste"
2024	Lyn Lapid	Buttons	"Buttons"
2024	Freya Skye	Winter Dream	"Winter Dream"
2024	Koe Wetzel	9 Lives	"Good Times (Bonus Track)"
2024	Jenna Raine, Avery Anna	Roses	"Roses (feat. Avery Anna)"
2024	Jelly Roll	Beautifully Broken	"Born Again"
2024	Jelly Roll	Beautifully Broken	"Hear Me Out"
2024	Charlie Hickey	Death Grip	"Death Grip"
2024	Dylan Schneider	PUZZLED	"Here Comes The Sun"
2024	Logan Crosby	2019	"Seasons"
2024	Pia Mia	Anti Romantica	"Owe Me"
2024	Ashe	Willson	"Running Out Of Time"
2024	Sabrina Carpenter	Short n' Sweet	"Don’t Smile"
2024	Sabrina Carpenter	Short n' Sweet	"Espresso"
2024	Niko Moon, Michael Franti & Spearhead	THESE ARE THE DAYS	"IT'S ALL GOOD"
2024	JADE	That's Showbiz Baby	"Angel Of My Dreams"
2024	Shania Twain, BRELAND	Boots Don't (From Twisters: The Album)	"Boots Don't (From Twisters: The Album)"
2024	Dillon Francis, chloe moriondo	Lonely (Planet Earth)	"Lonely (Planet Earth)"
2024	Avery Anna	Breakup Over Breakfast	"vanilla"
2024	Meghan Trainor	Timeless	"Hate It Here"
2024	Thomas Day	Pretender	"Pretender"
2024	Teddy Swims	I've Tried Everything But Therapy (Part 1.5)	"Growing Up is Getting Old"
2024	Julia Wolf	In My Room	"In My Room"
2024	Myles Smith	Betting on Us	"Betting on Us"
2024	Nicky Youre	Part Time Lover	"Part Time Lover"
2024	Sofia Carson	I Hope You Know	"I Hope You Know"
2025	Demi Lovato	It's Not That Deep	"Kiss"
2025	Demi Lovato	It's Not That Deep	"Ghost"
2026	Flo	Therapy at the Club	"Leak It"
2026	Demi Lovato	It's Not That Deep (Unless You Want It to Be)	"Pretty Catatonic"
2026	Kacey Musgraves	Middle of Nowhere	"Mexico Honey"
2026	Olivia Rodrigo	You Seem Pretty Sad for a Girl So in Love	"My Way"
2026	Waylon Wyatt	Dustpiles	"Box of Bones"
