= Dustpiles =

Studio album by Waylon Wyatt
- Released: July 17, 2026
- Recorded: 2025–2026
- Genres: Alternative country; Americana
- Length: 55:48
- Labels: Music Soup; Darkroom
- Producers: JR Atkins; Joe Becker; Tofer Brown; Anderson East; Ian Fitchuk

Waylon Wyatt chronology
Out of the Blue (2025)	Dustpiles (2026)

Singles from Dustpiles
- 1. "In Loving Melody" Released: February 6, 2026; 2. "Dead Man Walkin'" Released: April 24, 2026

Dustpiles is the debut studio album by American country music singer-songwriter Waylon Wyatt. It was released on July 17, 2026, through Music Soup and Darkroom Records. It was preceded by the singles "In Loving Melody" and "Dead Man Walkin'" plus the promotional singles "But There Was a Time", "Leave It Alone", and "Box of Bones". Wyatt co-wrote all sixteen tracks, which he states were largely inspired by the emotional journey and universal search for love. The album also includes a re-recording of "Everything Under the Sun" with a full band; a solo acoustic version appeared on Wyatt's debut EP Til' the Sun Goes Down.

== Background ==
Wyatt initially gained prominence on social media when a video of him singing "Everything Under the Sun" went viral on TikTok after he was convinced to post it by a friend. The success of the video led to him signing a record deal with Music Soup and Darkroom Records a week later. He released his debut extended play Til' the Sun Goes Down in November 2024, followed by Out of the Blue in June 2025.

The album was officially announced on May 14, 2026. Wyatt explained that the project was written between Nashville, Tennessee, Oklahoma and his native Hackett, Arkansas without a set timeline and collaborated with an outside set of songwriters and producers for the first time, as Wyatt had written and produced both of his EPs by himself. The album's title is taken from the final track, with Wyatt stating, "it’s a witty way of referring to how love should be but in a darker manner: finding that special someone who you are so close and secure with, and in the end the two of you ultimately become two piles of dust".

The full track list was released on July 13.

=== Singles ===
"In Loving Melody" was released as the lead single for the then-unannounced album on February 6, 2026. Of the track, Wyatt stated, "I wrote ‘In Loving Melody’ a long time ago, but it stuck with me so I decided to record it. I wanted a song that makes you want to bop your head to it, but when you look deeper into the lyrics it makes you want to tear up a lil". Lyrically, the song tells the story of a man whose partner has died before him, and his promises to keep her memory alive forever through the music they used to enjoy together.

The album's second single, "Dead Man Walkin'", was released on April 24, 2026. Teasing the track, Wyatt expressed, "been loving playing the one for y’all out on the road! Had to get it out for y’all soon!". In the song, Wyatt expresses that how a new relationship has reinvigorated him. A music video was released on May 4.

== Promotion ==
On July 16, Wyatt performed "Leave It Alone" on The Kelly Clarkson Show.

Wyatt will embark on the Dustpiles World Tour on July 31, 2026, in Kansas City, Missouri and it is scheduled to conclude in Perth, Australia on Jan 29, 2027. The tour, Wyatt's largest to date, will cover North America, Europe, and Australia.

== Track listing ==
Dustpiles track listing
No.	Title	Writer(s)	Producer(s)	Length
1.	"But There Was a Time"	Waylon Wyatt Potter; Brett Truitt	Joe Becker	3:50
2.	"Leave It Alone"	Potter	Tofer Brown	3:19
3.	"Otherside"	Potter; Anderson East	East	3:44
4.	"Wishful Thinking"	Potter; East	Waylon Wyatt; East	3:54
5.	"7 Minutes"	Potter; Joe Becker	Becker	3:11
6.	"In Loving Melody"	Potter	Ian Fitchuk	3:23
7.	"Dead Man Walkin'"	Potter; J. R. Atkins; Truitt	Atkins; Truitt	2:39
8.	"Box of Bones"	Potter; Becker; Steph Jones	Becker	3:01
9.	"No One Else"	Potter; East	East	3:24
10.	"The Dress"	Potter; East	East	4:03
11.	"Body Heat"	Potter; East	East	2:55
12.	"What We Were Fighting For"	Potter	Fitchuk	3:37
13.	"Out of Place"	Potter; Atkins; Truitt	Atkins; Truitt	2:50
14.	"Everything Under the Sun (Band Version)"	Potter	Atkins; Truitt	4:19
15.	"Call It a Night"	Potter; Truitt	Atkins; Truitt	4:16
16.	"Dustpiles"	Potter; Atkins; Truitt	Atkins; Truitt	3:23
Total length:				55:48

== Personnel ==
Credits are adapted from Tidal.

=== Musicians ===
- Waylon Wyatt – vocals (all tracks), acoustic guitar (tracks 1, 4, 5, 8, 9)
- Aksel Coe – drums, percussion (1, 2, 5, 8)
- Joe Becker – bass guitar, piano (1, 5, 8); programming (1), keyboards (5), khamak (8)
- Seth Taylor – acoustic guitar (1, 5)
- Chancey – electric guitar (1, 5)
- Tyler Bryant – acoustic guitar (1, 8), electric guitar (8)
- Kris Donegan – electric guitar (2, 7); baritone guitar, organ (2); acoustic guitar (7, 13–16), banjo (13, 14), guitar (15)
- Todd Lombardo – 12-string acoustic guitar, acoustic guitar (2)
- Tofer Brown – background vocals, piano (2)
- Russ Pahl – pedal steel guitar (2)
- Anderson East – acoustic guitar (3, 4, 9–11), electric guitar (4); background vocals, bass guitar, drums, Hammond organ, piano (9); banjo (11)
- Brian Allen – bass guitar (3, 10, 11)
- Chris Powell – drums, percussion (3, 10, 11)
- Weston Stewart – electric guitar (3, 10, 11)
- Philip Towns – Hammond organ (3, 10, 11), piano (11)
- Billy Justineau – piano (7, 13, 15), organ (7), Wurlitzer (13, 14, 16), synthesizer (15, 16)
- Brett Truitt – background vocals (7, 13, 14), organ (13, 14); electric guitar, lap steel guitar, synthesizer (15)
- J. R. Atkins – background vocals (7), bass guitar (13–15), baritone guitar (13, 14)
- Brandon Combs – drums (7, 14), percussion (7)
- Julia DiGrazia – fiddle (7, 15, 16)
- Sarah Gross – background vocals (7)
- Lex Price – bass guitar (7)
- Ian Fitchuk – acoustic guitar, electric guitar, organ, piano (12)
- Jon Estes – upright bass (12)
- Jack McLoughlin – pedal steel guitar (13, 14)
- James Ennis – drums (15)

=== Technical ===
- Joe Becker – engineering (1, 5), mixing (1, 5, 8)
- Aksel Coe – engineering (1)
- Buckley Miller – engineering (2)
- Anderson East – engineering (3, 4, 9–11), mixing (3, 9–11)
- Logan Matheny – engineering (7, 13–16)
- J. D. Halstead – engineering (8)
- Jon Estes – engineering, mixing (12)
- Savannah Kelly – engineering (15)
- Jack McLoughlin – string engineering (7), additional engineering (13–16)
- Joanna Finley – additional engineering (2)
- Tofer Brown – additional engineering (2)
- Trenton Woodman – additional engineering (7), engineering assistance (13–16)
- Bryan Brown – mixing (2, 4, 7, 13–16)
- Nathan Dantzler – mastering
- Harrison Tate – mastering assistance
- Andy Selby – digital editing (2)

== Charts ==
Chart performance for Dustpiles
Chart (2026)	Peak position
UK Americana Albums (Official Charts)	14
