= Don't Break Her Heart =

2026 single by Flo

Single by Flo

from the album Therapy at the Club
- Released: 5 June 2026
- Genre: R&B; pop
- Length: 3:44
- Label: EMI
- Songwriters: Jorja Douglas; Renée Downer; Stella Quaresma; Julian Bunetta; Steph Jones
- Producer: Julian Bunetta

Flo singles chronology
"Leak It" (2026)	"Don't Break Her Heart" (2026)	"Remedied" (2026)

Music video
- "Don't Break Her Heart" on YouTube

"Don't Break Her Heart" is a song recorded by British girl group Flo. It was released on 5 June 2026 through EMI Records as the second single from the group's second studio album, Therapy at the Club (2026). As well as Flo having writing credits on the track, it was also co-written by Julian Bunetta and Steph Jones, with Bunetta handling the production.

The lyrical content of the song revolves around Flo issuing a warning to the romantic partners of their friends, demanding that they not mistreat them otherwise they would enact revenge on them. Flo described it as an anthem about sisterhood and felt it displayed their love for each other. A music video directed by Troy Roscoe was released alongside the track. "Don't Break Her Heart" peaked at number 24 on the Rhythmic Airplay chart in the U.S.

== Background and release ==
In March 2026, Flo released "Leak It" as the lead single from their second studio album, Therapy at the Club (2026). "Leak It" saw Flo depart from their typical R&B sound; member Stella Quaresma told BBC News that they had been experimenting with different genres but noted that confidence and feeling good was a staple theme for the new music. It was followed by the release of "Therapy at the Club", a promotional single and the titular track from the album. Following its release, Flo began teasing the release of "Don't Break Her Heart" on social media, until its eventual release as the second single on 5 June.

== Composition and lyrics ==
"Don't Break Her Heart" was written by the three members of Flo alongside Julian Bunetta and Steph Jones, who worked with the group on "Leak It". Bunetta also handled the production. It has been described as an R&B and pop song. The lyrical content of the song acts as a warning to the romantic partner of a friend, demanding them not to mistreat their friend, otherwise they will have to deal with Flo. The group described it as their "favourite sisterhood anthem", noting that it encapsulated their love for each other and the lengths they would go to in protecting their friends.

== Music video ==
An accompanying music video for "Don't Break Her Heart" was released, directed by Troy Roscoe. The music video sees Flo working for a firm called Filthy Little Operations (FLO), a group specialising in tracking down misbehaving lovers on behalf of their clients and seeking vengeance for them.

== Credits and personnel ==
Credits adapted from Spotify.

- Jorja Douglas – vocals, songwriting
- Renée Downer – vocals, songwriting
- Stella Quaresma – vocals, songwriting
- Julian Bunetta – production, songwriting, programming, bass, guitar, drums, synthesiser
- Steph Jones – songwriting
- Oak – vocal production and engineering
- Jeff Gunnell – recording engineering
- Sean McNamara – vocal engineering
- Serban Ghenea – mixing engineering
- Bryce Bordone – engineering
- Nathan Dantzler – mastering engineering
- Harrison Tate – second mastering engineering

== Charts ==
Weekly chart performance
Chart (2026)	Peak position
Estonia Airplay (TopHit)	95
Nigeria Airplay (TurnTable)	88
Suriname (Nationale Top 40)	13
US Rhythmic Airplay (Billboard)	19

== Release history ==
Region	Date	Format	Label	Ref.
Various	5 June 2026	Digital download; streaming	EMI	
United States	9 June 2026	Rhythmic contemporary radio	EMI	
