= Worst Behavior (disambiguation) =

"Worst Behavior" is a 2014 single by Drake.

Worst Behavior or Worst Behaviour may also refer to:

- "Worst Behaviour", 2024 song by Kwn
- "Worst Behaviour" (Alma song)
- "Worst Behavior" (Ariana Grande song)
- "Worst Behavior" (The Defenders)
