= Wyatt Flores =

- Born: Wyatt Flores; June 29, 2001 (age 25); Stillwater, Oklahoma
- Genres: Country; folk rock; Americana; red dirt
- Occupations: Singer-songwriter; musician
- Years active: 2021–present
- Label: Island
- Website: www.wyattfloresmusic.com

Wyatt Flores performing at Menard County Fair in Petersburg, IL

Wyatt Flores (born June 29, 2001) is an American country music singer-songwriter and musician. His debut studio album, Welcome to the Plains, was released in 2024 and his second studio album, Scared of Heights, was released in 2026. He also has released three extended plays.

== Early life ==
Flores was born to Noe Flores, a retired welder and former drummer in a local band, and his wife Shannon, a school administrator, in Stillwater, Oklahoma. He has an older sister, Alicia, who now works in his crew as a merchandising director. Flores' uncle Bobby also played with his father and two other members, Scott Lester and Kelley Green who went on to become members of red dirt group The Great Divide and became musical mentors to Flores while he was growing up. Flores describes his other main musical influence as Evan Felker and his band the Turnpike Troubadours.

== Career ==
Flores debuted on the Billboard charts for the first time on December 2, 2023, with "Please Don't Go", a song from his EP The Hutson Sessions, premiered at number 43 on the Hot Country Songs chart.

On December 27, 2023, he released a cover of "How to Save a Life" by The Fray, stating "I hope this little late Christmas gift helps those who aren’t having the best holiday season".

In February 2024, Flores took a brief hiatus from performing and cancelled several of his upcoming tour dates, citing struggles with his mental health and impostor syndrome. He resumed performing in April.

Flores released his second EP, Half Life, on April 19, 2024. Discussing the project, which features songs dissecting his relationship with fame, mental health, religion, and romantic relationships, with Grammy.com, he stated that "I like to keep it very based on what I felt, and just try and go for that emotion. If you can somehow captivate [listeners] in the story and make them feel the emotion through the song, then you've done your job. I guess that's all I'm after."

On August 30, 2024, Flores announced that his debut studio album, Welcome to the Plains, would be released on October 18 via Island Records. It was preceded by the release of the lead single "Don't Wanna Say Goodnight". On October 18, 2024, Flores performed "Oh Susannah" on The Late Show with Stephen Colbert.

Flores recorded an episode of Austin City Limits on September 19, 2025 as part of the show's fifty-first season. On February 20, 2026, Flores released "Didn't Forget", which features Waylon Wyatt, to positive critical reception, with Billboard declaring it one of the six best new country songs that week and calling it "a compelling collaboration from two emerging talents with rising momentum".

In April 2026 Flores was awarded the Oklahoma Music Hall of Fame Rising Star award during a concert in his hometown. In May, he announced that his second studio album, Scared of Heights, which is inspired by his journey with anxiety and a lack of self-belief, would be released on July 31, 2026, preceded by the singles "Drive All Night" and "Runnin' On E".

Flores released a series of additional collaborations throughout Summer 2026, including "Saving This Bottle" with Diplo, guesting on "Hey There Son" from longtime friend and mentor Charles Wesley Godwin's album Christian Name. He also joined Carter Faith on duet "Nothin' Better To Do", included on Faith's deluxe version of her debut album Cherry Valley Forever, and the collaboration served as the pair's first official single serviced to US Country Radio.

Upon the release of Scared of Heights on July 31, 2026, Flores played significant "Album Release Pop Up Shows" starting with a crowd of over 6,500 fans at Guthrie Green Park in downtown Tulsa, Oklahoma. Flores also made stops in Nashville, (including at The Grand Ole Opry for his 11th official appearance, as well as Denver and Chicago.

== Personal life ==
Flores is of Mexican descent.

== Band ==
- Wyatt Flores - vocals, guitar
- Clem Braden - piano, organ, mandolin, harmonica, electric guitar, acoustic guitar
- Jake Lynn - drums
- Kenzie Miracle - fiddle, trumpet
- Bill Peters - bass
- Austin Yankunas - guitar

== Discography ==
=== Studio albums ===
List of albums, with selected details
Title	Album details	Peak chart positions
Title	Album details	US
Welcome to the Plains	Release date: October 18, 2024; Label: Island; Format: CD, digital download, LP, streaming	—
Scared of Heights	Release date: July 31, 2026; Label: Island; Format: CD, digital download, LP, cassette, streaming	188

=== Live albums ===
List of albums, with selected details
Title	Album details
Live at Cain's Ballroom	Release date: February 14, 2025; Label: Island; Format: digital download, LP, streaming

=== Extended plays ===
List of extended plays with selected details
Title	Details
The Hutson Sessions	Released: August 19, 2022; Label: OEG; Formats: Digital download, streaming
Life Lessons	Released: November 19, 2023; Label: OEG/Island; Formats: Digital download, EP, streaming
Half Life	Released: April 19, 2024; Label: OEG/Island; Formats: CD, Digital download, EP, streaming

=== Singles ===
List of singles
Date	Title	Album	Certification
April 14, 2021	"Travelin' Kid"	Non-album single	
February 11, 2022	"Losing Sleep"	Non-album single	RIAA: Gold
April 22, 2022	"Please Don't Go"	Non-album single	RIAA: 2× Platinum
October 14, 2022	"Way Back Home"	Non-album single	
December 2, 2022	"Burning Bridges"	Non-album single	
January 13, 2023	"Break My Bones"	Non-album single	
February 10, 2023	"Losing Sleep – Revisited"	Non-album single	
May 5, 2023	"Ain't Proud"	Non-album single	
July 14, 2023	"Holes"	Life Lessons	
September 24, 2023	"West of Tulsa"	Life Lessons	
December 26, 2023	"How to Save a Life" (The Fray cover)	Half Life	
January 26, 2024	"Milwaukee"	Half Life	RIAA: Gold
March 22, 2024	"Wish I Could Stay"	Half Life	
April 5, 2024	"Take Me as I Come" (duet with Evan Honer)	Fighting For (Evan Honer album)	
July 16, 2024	"Before I Do" (duet with Jake Kohn)	Twisters: The Album	
July 26, 2024	"Sober Sundays" (duet with the Castellows)	Non-album single	
August 30, 2024	"Don't Wanna Say Goodnight"	Welcome to the Plains	
September 27, 2024	"Oh Susannah"	Welcome to the Plains	
October 11, 2024	"Little Town"	Welcome to the Plains	
October 16, 2024	"Welcome to the Plains"	Welcome to the Plains	
February 7, 2025	"West of Tulsa" (Live at Cain's Ballroom)	Live at Cain's Ballroom	
February 20, 2026	"Didn't Forget" with Waylon Wyatt	Non-album single	
March 20, 2026	"Runnin' on E"	Scared of Heights	
May 1, 2026	"Drive All Night"	Scared of Heights	
June 5, 2026	"Half the Man"	Scared of Heights	
July,10 2026	"Scared of Heights"	Scared of Heights	

== Awards and nominations ==
Year	Association	Category	Nominated work	Result	Ref.
2024	Americana Music Honors & Awards	Emerging Artist of the Year	Himself	Nominated	
2026	Oklahoma Music Hall of Fame	Rising Star Award	Himself	Won	
