= Welcome to the Plains =

Studio album by Wyatt Flores
- Released: October 18, 2024
- Studios: Echo Mountain Studio, Asheville, North Carolina; Los Angeles; Nashville
- Genres: Red Dirt; Folk Rock; Americana
- Length: 53:08
- Label: Island
- Producer: Beau Bedford

Wyatt Flores chronology
Half Life (2024)	Welcome to the Plains (2024)	Scared of Heights (2026)

Singles from Welcome to the Plains
- 1. "Don't Wanna Say Goodnight" Released: August 30, 2024; 2. "Oh Susannah" Released: September 26, 2024; 3. "Little Town" Released: October 11, 2024; 4. "Welcome to the Plains" Released: October 16, 2024

Welcome to the Plains is the debut studio album by American country music singer-songwriter Wyatt Flores. It was released on October 18, 2024, via Island Records and was produced by Beau Bedford. The album was preceded by the lead single "Don't Wanna Say Goodnight", and subsequent singles "Oh Susannah", "Little Town", and the title track. It features 14 tracks, all of which were co-written by Flores, which detail his musical journey from his native Stillwater, Oklahoma, his life on the road, and explore themes of home, family, and the search for happiness.

Flores embarked on the Welcome to the Plains Tour in autumn 2024 in support of the album, beginning in Oklahoma City and concluding in Tulsa. The trek includes two nights at both Nashville's historic Ryman Auditorium, and Oklahoma's Cain's Ballroom. He will also support Luke Combs at this The Gorge Amphitheatre in October 2024.

== Background ==
The album was officially announced on August 30, 2024, alongside the release of "Don't Wanna Say Goodnight". In a statement following the announcement of the project, Flores explained “it’s an album about home and a search for happiness. It’s an album about Stillwater, Oklahoma, and all the other little towns that have raised people like you and me. It’s an album about my family, and the people and places in my life who have defined who I am today. This album is happy on one side and heartbreak on the other, and whoever you are, I hope you find something you love in here.” The album was recorded between Los Angeles and Asheville, and the majority of the songs were written in May 2024 during a two-week trip with producer Bedford.

Flores discussed the album with Rolling Stone and his headspace while making the project, which followed a hiatus that he took from performing to focus on his mental health in February and March 2024. He explained that his songwriting process has evolved in light of the break, noting that “on the writing side, I’m not as hard on myself. I felt a lot of pressure from people telling me I was a good writer, and I was like, ‘I don’t think I am! I look up to my heroes, and I can’t write like them. I’m not good enough.’ It's a lot of self-sabotage, and I’ve been able to take that weight off of myself”, and adding that “I couldn’t believe the songs that I had written. I finally started writing happier songs. There’s still some heartbreak on there, but I just couldn’t believe that I actually had love songs.”

Speaking to Billboard, Flores reiterated his trepidation about releasing the project, stating “I was like, ‘I don’t think I’m good enough for an album yet.’ But it came to a point where I was like, ‘Just let the songs be what they are and capture the moments of where I’ve been without overthinking it.’” He described Welcome to the Plains coming after a dark period in his life trying to meet the demands of his skyrocketing career while battling anxiety and imposter syndrome, and trying to process the loss of some people close to him, including his grandfather. In light of this, Flores expressed that the motivation for the album was to write songs that help listeners through hard times. Flores felt that a lot of the songs ended up being a lot more positive than he expected, noting that perhaps he was “daydreaming about a better time”, adding that even some of the songs which focus on darker themes, such as "When I Die", feature elements of humor and levity. Flores described "When I Die" as “the weirdest love song I’ve ever written” and explained that “I’ve written so many songs about living and dying because I’ve lost a lot of people in my life, so that’s where my head space was. I’m sure people are going to be listening to it around the time they’re grieving over someone and I hope it gives them a bit of a smile instead of just sobbing.”

== Critical reception ==
Welcome to the Plains received generally positive reviews from critics. In a write-up from UK-based publication Entertainment Focus, reviewer Emma Jordan described the album as a "stunning tribute to self-discovery, as well as home and ancestors" and complimenting Flores' "wry observations", the hopeful nature of several of the tracks, and the "traditional, earthy, rural-leaning country sound". Writing for The Bluegrass Situation, banjo player Justin Hiltner declared, "Welcome to the Plains is one of the most remarkable records of 2024; it continues a tone long set in Flores’ career and music, even before this current inflection point and its substantial momentum. Wyatt Flores is bound for longevity, for many more successes, for many more millions of plays, as long as he remains exactly who he is: Wyatt Flores". Creed Miller of Country Central awarded the album 8.9 out of 10 and citied the title track, "Forget Your Voice", and "Oh Susannah" as highlights of the project. He summarised by writing, "with expectations higher than they have ever been for the young Oklahoman, he stepped up to the plate and knocked them out of the park. From the writing and production to the raw vocals, Wyatt Flores shows a lot of maturity, making it hard to believe this is his debut album. Real thought and time were put into the project, and it showed. With no skips on the record, he surpasses expectations and proves he can hang with some of the best names in country music."

== Track listing ==
Welcome to the Plains track listing
No.	Title	Writer(s)	Length
1.	"Welcome to the Plains"	Wyatt Flores; Ketch Secor	3:44
2.	"When I Die"	David Devaul; Flores	3:42
3.	"Oh Susannah"	Devaul; Flores	4:04
4.	"Only Thing Missing is You"	Flores; Aaron Raitiere	3:43
5.	"Don't Wanna Say Goodnight"	Brad Clawson; Flores; Gavin Lucas	3:24
6.	"Habits"	Rose Falcon; Flores	2:58
7.	"Right Here with You"	Duvaul; Flores	4:04
8.	"The Truth"	Flores; David Hodges; Ricky Manning	5:03
9.	"Forget Your Voice"	Nick Bailey; Flores; Blake Pendergrass	3:54
10.	"Angels Over You"	Beau Bedford; Flores; Raitiere	3:47
11.	"Little Town"	Flores; Jack McLaughlin; Jackson Lee Morgan	3:38
12.	"Stillwater"	Austin Yankunas; Flores; Cole Miracle	3:50
13.	"Falling Sideways"	Bedford; Flores	3:41
14.	"The Good Ones"	Bedford; Flores; Raitiere	3:31
Total length:			53:08

== Charts ==
Chart performance for Welcome to the Plains
Chart (2024)	Peak position
UK Americana (OCC)	40
