= Kwn =

British rapper and singer-songwriter (born 2000)

kwn
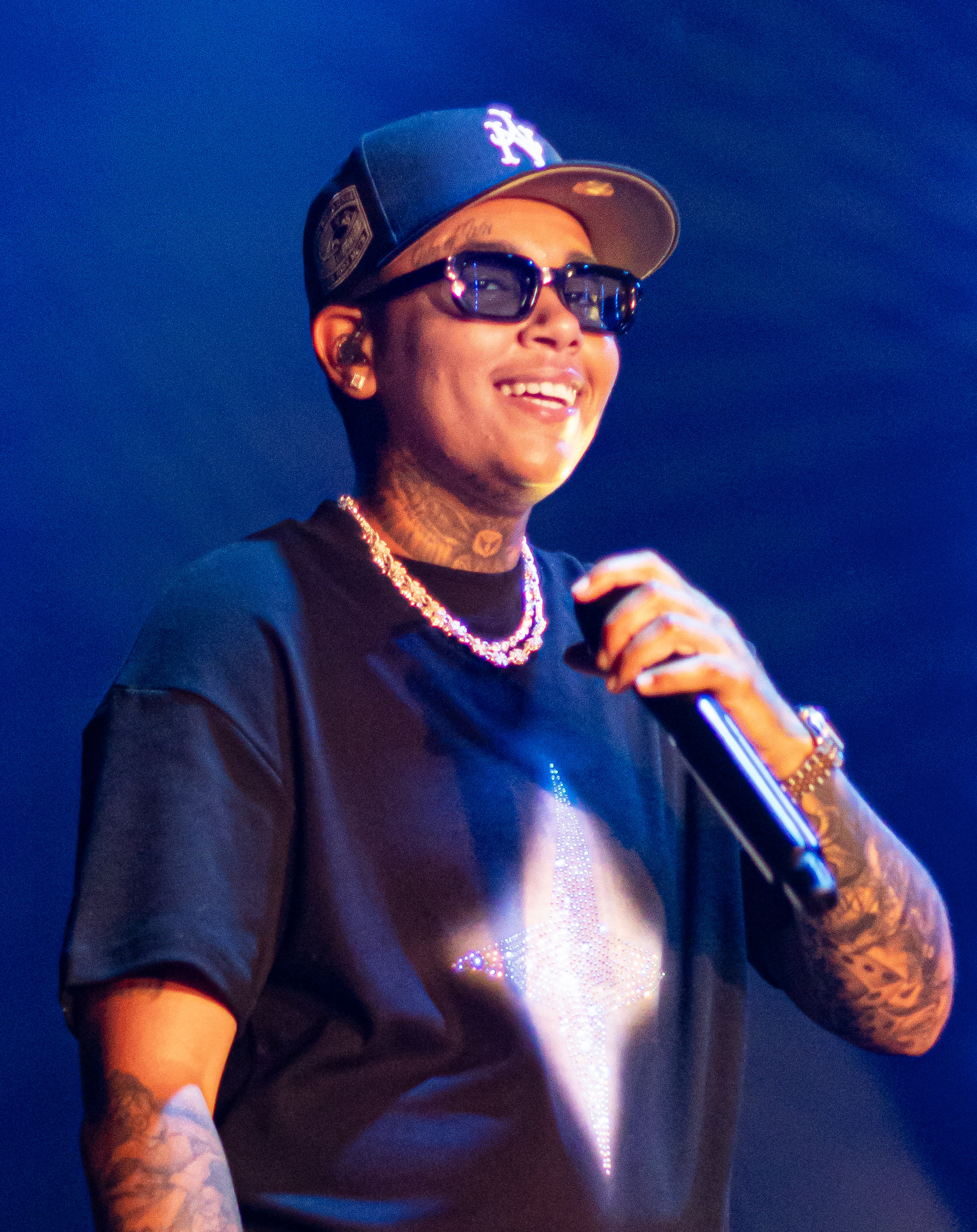
- kwn performing at the 2026 Montreux Jazz Festival

Background information
- Born: Khyra Wilson; 5 April 2000 (age 26); Walthamstow, East London, England
- Genres: R&B; hip-hop; soul
- Occupations: Singer; songwriter; rapper
- Instruments: Vocals; piano
- Years active: 2022–present
- Labels: RCA; Black Butter

Khyra Wilson or K. Wilson (born 5 April 2000), known professionally as kwn (pronounced kay-wuhn) and formerly k1, is a British singer, songwriter, rapper, and producer. She is best known for her 2024 single "Worst Behaviour", which entered the UK singles chart, while its remix (featuring Kehlani) entered the US Hot R&B/Hip-Hop Songs chart.

She was nominated for Best New International Act at the 2025 BET Awards, was named Billboard's R&B Rookie of the Month, and was included on the NME 100 list of "essential emerging artists".

== Early life ==
Kwn was born and grew up in Walthamstow, East London. She has two older sisters. Her father is Nigerian and her mother is Irish.

She started playing piano and drums in her childhood. She realized by the time she was 11 years old that she wanted to become a musician, after which she started making music and releasing it on SoundCloud. She was inspired in part by her father, who was at one time a DJ, and who exposed kwn to a wide variety of Western musical genres, including R&B, pop, garage, house, as well as various genres of African music. When she was 16, she began attending the arts college East London Arts & Music, which pushed her to work harder at her music. After college, she worked as a chef, and before deciding to pursue music, she was interested in playing football professionally.

== Career ==
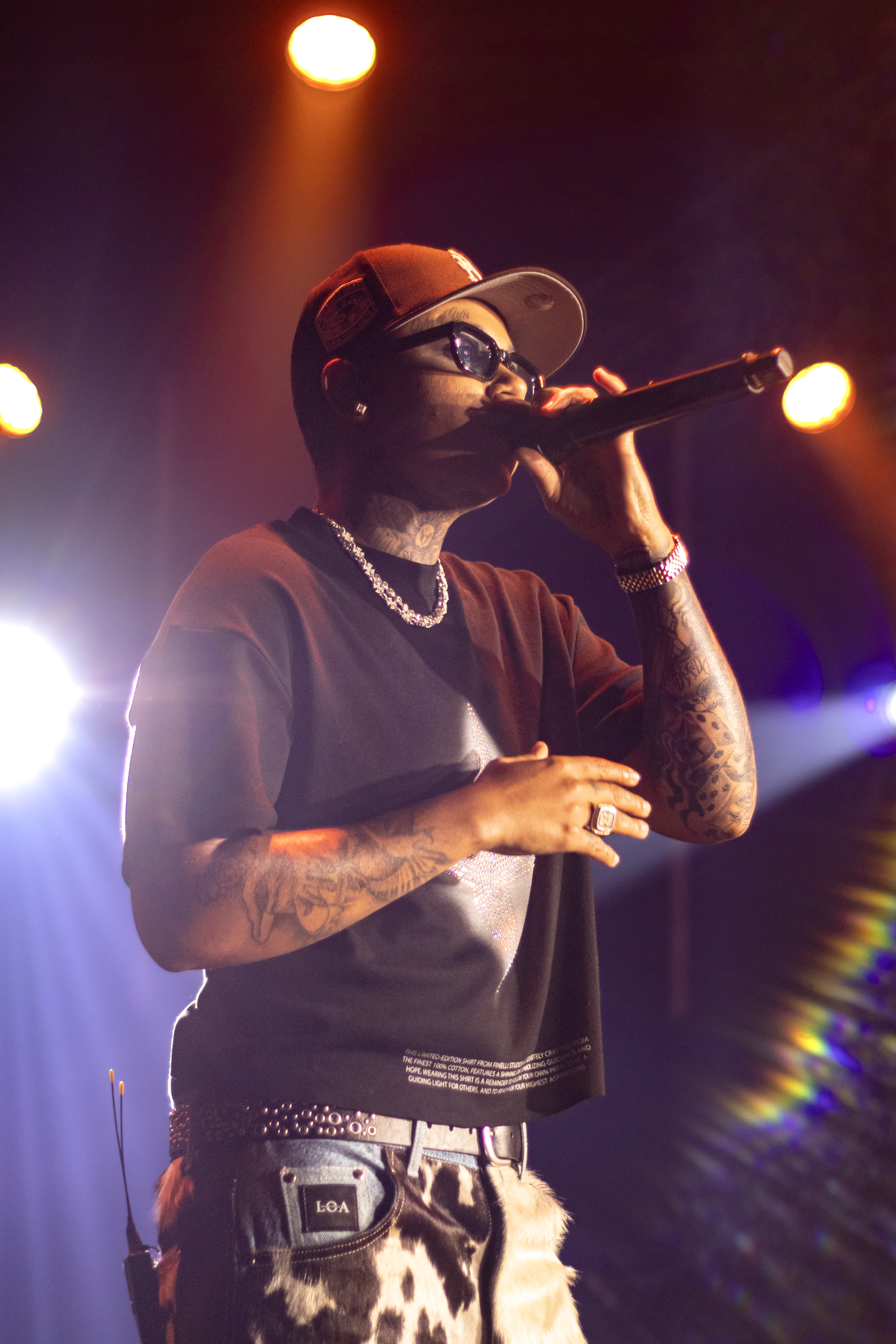
kwn at the 2026 Montreux Jazz Festival

Initially known as k1, she changed her stage name to kwn – incorporating the first and last letters of her last name – to avoid being mistaken for a drill rapper.

She began releasing music with Black Butter Records in 2022, debuting with the single, “wn way or another". Her debut EP episode wn was released later in 2022. She was dropped by the label shortly before the release of her single "Worst Behaviour".

Kwn opened for Kehlani for some of the latter's Crash European tour dates.

She was nominated for Best New International Act at the 2025 BET Awards. In March 2025, she was named Billboard's R&B Rookie of the Month. Billboard called her music "a moody amalgam of trap, soulful vocal stacks and splashes of dark electronic music that both captures and reimagines the post-Bryson Tiller R&B landscape." When asked about her own genre placement, kwn said, "I don’t really think I could pinpoint a sound; I just do whatever feels good," though she noted R&B as a consistent influence in her music. She also received a place on NME's 2025 list of one hundred "essential emerging artists".

Her music videos often feature one-shot filming.

== Personal life ==
Kwn has described herself as "literally . . . gay since [she] came out of the womb". Of her sexuality, she has said, "I’m just a girl who likes girls. I don’t like putting labels on things." She is an introvert. Her favorite tattoo reads "lord i've tried" in Spanish ("dios he tratado"), after her song of the same title.

In October 2025, she confirmed that she was in a relationship with Kehlani, after months of speculation.

== Discography ==
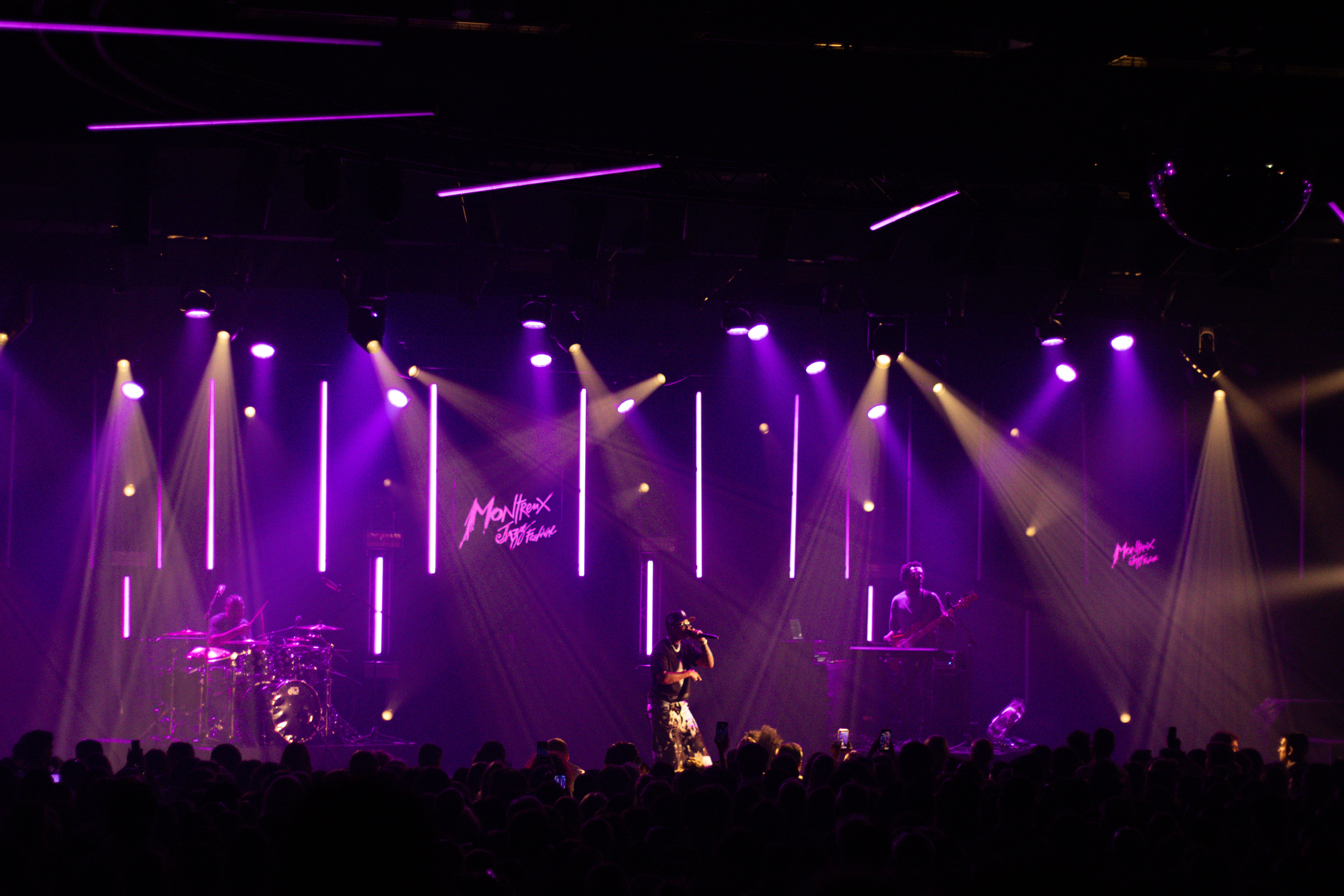
kwn's concert in 2026

=== Extended plays ===
Title	Details	Peak chart positions	
Title	Details	UK	AUS
Episode Wn	Released: 4 November 2022; Label: Black Butter; Formats: Streaming, digital download	—	—
With All Due Respect	Released: 20 June 2025; Label: RCA, Wnway Limited; Formats: Streaming, digital download	—	—
And All Pride Aside	Released: 26 June 2026; Label: RCA, Wnway Limited; Formats: Streaming, digital download	93	74

=== Singles ===
Title	Year	Peak chart positions		Album
Title	Year	UK	US Rhy.	Album
"Wn Way or Another"	2022	—	—	Episode Wn
"Nobody"	2022	—	—	Episode Wn
"No Cinderella"	2023	—	—	Non-album singles
"Five More"	2023	—	—	Non-album singles
"Wn Up"	2023	—	—	Non-album singles
"Lord I've Tried"	2024	—	—	Non-album singles
"Eyes Wide Open"	2024	—	—	Non-album singles
"Worst Behaviour"	2024	75	—	Non-album singles
"Worst Behaviour" remix (featuring Kehlani)	2025	—	—	With All Due Respect
"Do What I Say"	2025	—	—	With All Due Respect
"Back of the Club"	2025	—	—	With All Due Respect
"All the Girls"	2025	—	—	With All Due Respect
"Hopeless Romantic"	2026	—	—	And All Pride Aside
"Touch Myself"	2026	—	—	And All Pride Aside
"Idea of Love"	2026	—	—	And All Pride Aside
"Risk It All"	2026	—	29	And All Pride Aside

=== Features ===
List of guest appearances, with the respective artists, showing year released and album name
Title	Year	Artist	Album
"Clothes Off"	2025	Kehlani	While We Wait 2
"Too Many Women"	2025	Jordan Adetunji	A Jaguar's Dream
"Sex in Peace"	2026	FLO	Therapy at the Club
"Amazing"	2026	Ayra Starr	Starr Girl
"DADAMAN"	2026	Destin Conrad	ROADRUNNER

== Awards and nominations ==
Organisation	Year	Work	Category	Result
BET Awards	2025	Herself	Best New International Act	Nominated
Ivor Novello Awards	2026	Herself	Rising Star Award with Amazon Music	Nominated
BRIT Awards	2026	Herself	Best R&B Act	Nominated
BBC Radio 1	2026	Kwn	Sound of 2026	Nominated
MOBO Awards	2026	"Do What I Say"	Best Newcomer; Best Female Act; Best R&B/Soul; Song of the Year	Nominated
