= Therapy at the Club =

Studio album by Flo
- Released: 7 August 2026
- Genres: Pop; R&B
- Length: 46:11
- Label: EMI
- Producers: Astral Weeks; Grant Boutin; Tommy Brown; Ryan Buendia; Julian Bunetta; Jonah Christian; Leroy Clampitt; Cole YoursTruly; Jake Elliott; Jean-Baptiste; Lauren Keen; KingJet; Leather Jacket; Oscar Linnander; Lostboy; MNEK; Oak; KP Page; D. Phelps; Phinisey; Karl Rubin; Ashton Sellars; Jayme Silverstein; Skippz; Solomonophonic; Victor Thell; Pop Wansel

Flo chronology
Access All Areas (2024)	Therapy at the Club (2026)

Singles from Therapy at the Club
- 1. "Leak It" Released: 20 March 2026; 2. "Don't Break Her Heart" Released: 5 June 2026; 3. "Remedied" Released: 24 July 2026

Therapy at the Club (stylised in all caps) is the second studio album by English girl group Flo. It was released on 7 August 2026 through EMI. Initially, the album was expected to be released on 24 July 2026, but Flo delayed the album for two weeks to extend their album's promotion and to accommodate member Jorja Douglas' vocal cord surgery. To make up for the delay, the group released their third official single "Remedied" on the initial release date.

The album is a follow-up to their debut album Access All Areas (2024), expanding on contemporary R&B with 2000s pop experimentation. Hoping to achieve a mainstream pop sound and vie for creative control, Flo described the album as their most "grown" and "honest" project to date, as it centers around the variety of emotions of nightlife after heartbreak. The album features guest vocals from Juicy J and Kwn. Unlike Flo's previous works, producer and longtime collaborator MNEK contributes one song on the project. Flo contributed songwriting, while appointing a wide range of pop and R&B producers such as Amy Allen, Julian Bunetta, Oak Felder, Pop Wansel and Tommy Brown and songwriters such as Amma and Sevyn Streeter.

The album received generally positive reviews from critics, who praised the group's vocals, vulnerability, and experimentation with pop. "Leak It" was released as the album's lead single on 20 March. To coincide with the album's official announcement, the group released the titular track "Therapy at the Club" as a promotional single on 6 May. The album's second single "Don't Break Her Heart" was released on 5 June, the third single "Remedied" was released on 24 July, and "Cry Ugly" coincided with the albums release. The album debuted at number five in the UK, making Flo the first British R&B girl group to debut their first two studio albums in the top five of the UK Albums Chart.

== Background and development ==
After forming in 2019, Flo released two extended plays (EPs): The Lead (2022) and 3 of Us (2023). On 15 November 2024, they released their debut studio album, Access All Areas (2024). It charted within the top three of the UK Albums Chart, as well as marking their chart debut on the Billboard Top 200 chart. The album gained recognition, garnering Flo's first nomination for a Grammy award; it was nominated for Best Progressive R&B Album at the 68th Annual Grammy Awards, but lost to Durand Bernarr Prior to the award nominations, an "unlocked" version of Access All Areas was released, featuring four songs: "Recently Deleted", "Do Too Much", "Say Less" and "Conceited".

On 4 February 2026, Flo began teasing their second album after featuring on a Twitch live stream with rapper and streamer PlaqueBoyMax. The group recorded live vocals for "Pose" in his studio and collaborated with rapper Juicy J who appeared on the live stream. During the live stream, the group also previewed their lead single "Leak It", which they confirmed would be released in March. After the group officially released "Leak It" on streaming platforms, the group appeared on NPR's Tiny Desk Concerts and previewed two unreleased songs intended for their second album: the title track of the album and "HaterBooth". On 9 May, Flo officially announced the album's title and artwork on social media platforms, allowing fans to pre-save and pre-order physical releases.

== Writing and recording ==
"It definitely feels more grown. We have grown up. We have been heavily involved in the album. We immersed ourselves into it… figuring out what needed healing and figuring out what we wanted to talk about. It feels very honest and more real.”

— Renée Downer of Flo, describing the group's creative control and recording process of Therapy at the Club,

In Flo's Billboard interview, the group described the album's sound and atmosphere compared to their debut album. Group member Renée Downer described the album as a reflection of who Flo is as both artists and women, while creative control and speaking up more in the studio contributed heavily to the making of the album.

According to Elle, Flo began writing music for the album shortly after their 2025 Access All Areas Tour. "We were ready because from when the Access All Areas writing processes had actually finished and then going on tour and all of that stuff, we were kind of rusty," Douglas said. "The mind was rusty. So, it was good that we just got into it because it was pretty low pressure at the beginning."

=== Album title and concept ===
According to Flo's interview with Elle, the group decided on Therapy at the Club as the album's title after being inspired by the title track, written by Amma who previously co-wrote "Shoulda Woulda Coulda" and "I'm Just a Girl" on the group's album Access All Areas (2024). The group were pitched the song and they loved it, and found inspiration with the title with their real-life activities. "When it came to making the actual album," Douglas added, "The name was just so in our minds because we were going clubbing and we were just like, it's making sense."

In an interview with Zane Lowe, the group expanded on the meaning of the album's title. Douglas revealed that the album's emphasis on "club" doesn't necessarily reflect on the album's sound, but the variety of emotions felt in a club setting. "You don't necessarily hear the riffs and runs in the club," Douglas said, "It's more just about the emotions that we feel in the club. The club, for us... was one of the main times we could actually let our hair down, spend time with each other... meet new people and just kind of have fun."

== Composition ==
Therapy at the Club is a pop and R&B record, maintaining its 2000s-inspired sound from Access All Areas (2024), while experimenting with a variety of sounds such as jazz, acoustic, dance and synth-pop elements. The group prioritized developing into a pop sound for the album. In an interview with BBC, Member Stella Quaresma embraced the album's creative process, mentioning how "fun it [was] to really blend genres and to delve more into making pop music to make really big songs."

In Flo's interview with Elle, the group cited musicians Ariana Grande, Beyoncé, and Christina Aguilera as musical influences for the album. Douglas and Downer cited Grande's debut album Yours Truly and third studio album Dangerous Woman as inspirations for the group's intent to "branch out" into pop-R&B territory. "We were working with a lot of more pop people," Downer said, "So I think we just needed great examples of people that are great at R&B that make popular music."

=== Music and lyrics ===
The album's opening track, "Side Effects" is a R&B song with melodic rap influences that serves as a "romantic" cautionary anthem, using consequences of love as a metaphor for prescription drug with side effects. Clash's Shanté Collier-McDermott described the track as a "sassy display of rap-singing that sets the tone for the high-energy theatrics that permeate across the album." 'Small Doses" is a synth-pop song made up of electronic elements, centering around love's "ability to transform" and its mental and emotional effects. Described by critics as theatrical and "throbbing", the song has drawn comparisons to Sam Smith and Kim Petras' 2022 song "Unholy". In an interview with Billboard, member Stella Quaresma deemed it her favorite song on the album, mentioning its aggression and intensity as key attributes. "When you sing it and when you listen to it," Quaresma said, "It also feels like you're releasing something. Like it's such a dual thing, and it's so good, so much passion."

The album's third track "Cry Ugly" grapples with strained relationships and self-worth; it is a 2000s R&B-influenced ballad accompanied by snare drum patterns, a syncopated groove compared to songs of Destiny's Child and Usher. At the end of the song, it seamlessly transitions into the album's lead single. Beginning with strings, "Leak It" transforms into an uptempo 2000s-pop anthem compared to girl groups Girls Aloud, The Pussycat Dolls, and Sugababes. Music critics acknowledged the track was an experimental departure from Flo's usual contemporary R&B sound in previous works. The song dissects modern fame, seeking attention on social media and from their former and current partners. The album's fifth track "Touché" is a pop song that incorporates electric guitars and funk elements. Described as a "bad-bitch anthem", the song conveys transforming criticisms as affirmations, with "I'm a cunt, I'm a bitch, I'm the shit, I must say" as the track's refrain. "I Can't Be High Around You Anymore" features R&B and hip-hop influences, sampling American rap group Bone Thugs-n-Harmony's 1995 song "1st of tha Month". "Sober" is an acoustic R&B ballad. The title track is a slow-tempo piano ballad reminiscent of 1960s girl groups was co-written by Amma, who also co-wrote tracks for Flo's debut album. The song explores using nightclubs as escapism after the end of a romantic relationship. Member Jorja Douglas revealed the song became the album's official title shortly after Flo approved the song for the track, inspired by their own encounters in nightlife. "Remedied" continues the concept of using nightlife as escapism, blending R&B and pop accompanied by horns and drums. Music critics compared the song to Christina Aguilera's 2006 song "Ain't No Other Man" and Raye's 2025 song "Where Is My Husband!". Flo described the song is "for anyone who's been stuck in a rut, it's that moment you finally get up, get out, and remember who you are. Consider it your cure."

"Pose", featuring rapper Juicy J, samples and interpolates Technotronic's 1989 house song "Pump Up the Jam" and is a braggadocio song that showcases the group's individual rapping abilities. The only song produced by longtime collaborator MNEK, "Call Me" is a R&B trap song that conveys open invitations and sexual desires while under the influence. "Sex in Peace", featuring musician Kwn, continues sexual desires on a R&B song that incorporates synths and beatboxing. "Floating" is a 1980s pop-inspired ballad. "Miss U Missing Me" is a guitar-driven 90s R&B ballad reminiscent of artists Mariah Carey and Toni Braxton. Member Jorja Douglas called it her favorite song from the album. The penultimate track and second single "Don't Break Her Heart" is a R&B ballad that poses as a threat to a romantic partner of a friend, demanding them not to mistreat them. The final track of the album "Haterbooth" is a pop song with doo wop and soft rock elements, encourages defying negativity and judgment, and embracing one's self. Clash described the track as a "Motown-inspired reverie". Member Renée Downer deemed the track her favorite song on the album, describing as their most unique, weirdest track on the project.

== Release and promotion ==
To promote the album, they appeared on numerous publications, radio interviews, and podcasts, such as Keke Palmer's podcast Baby, This Is Keke Palmer to discuss the album, inspirations, and creative control of the project. The group collaborated with Liquid I.V. and Ring Pop, appearing in advertisements promoting their song "Remedied". They appeared on Zane Lowe's Apple Music radio show on 18 June 2026.

On 6 May, Flo announced the album, revealed the album's artwork on social media, and released the title track as a promotional single on all platforms. The album would be available to pre-save on streaming platforms, and for pre-order with signed physical copies of the album on their website.

On 30 June, Flo announced on social media that the album would be delayed to 7 August instead of its initial release on 24 July. The group revealed that member Jorja Douglas would undergo vocal cord surgery, and they wanted to accommodate, while also expanding the album's promotion. They announced their third anticipated single "Remedied" would be released on the initial date. On 25 July, Flo announced pre-orders for exclusive CDs including three bonus tracks on their shop website.

=== Live performances ===
A month before the release of their lead single, Flo appeared on NPR Music's Tiny Desk Concerts series. The setlist included a rearranged version of their 2022 debut single "Cardboard Box", selects from their 2024 debut album, and concluded with then-unknown album tracks "Therapy at the Club" and "HaterBooth". The live performance amassed 1.2 million views on YouTube since its upload. On 28 March, the group performed "Leak It" for the first time at the MOBO Awards 2026 at the Co-op Live in Manchester, England.

On 13 June, Flo performed "Don't Break Her Heart" for Genius' Open Mic series. On 13 July and 21 July respectively, the group performed "Leak It" and "Therapy at the Club" for Vevo Studios. The group performed "Don't Break Her Heart" and a cover of Zara Larsson's "Midnight Sun" for BBC Radio 1's Live Lounge segment.

=== Singles and videos ===
On 20 March, "Leak It" was released as the album's lead single after Flo promoted the track on TikTok and previewed it on PlaqueBoyMax's Twitch live stream in February 2026. On 5 June, Flo released their second single "Don't Break Her Heart" with an accompanying music video centered around the group posing as a firm named Filthy Little Operations (FLO) that tracks down cheaters on behalf of their clients and seeking vengeance for them. "Remedied" was released as the third official single on the initial album release date, 24 July. The single was accompanied by a music video that is considered a prequel to the music video for "Leak It", where they are invited to a retreat.

=== Tours ===
On 21 May, Flo announced a limited Therapy in Session tour in United Kingdom, with acoustic performances of tracks from the album before release. On 24 June, Flo announced tour dates for the Therapy at the Club tour overseas.

== Critical reception ==
Professional ratings
Aggregate scores
Source	Rating
Metacritic	71/100
Review scores
Source	Rating
Clash	7/10
The Guardian	3/5 stars
NME	3.5/5 stars
Pitchfork	7.7/10
Slant Magazine	3/5 stars
The Skinny	3/5 stars

Therapy at the Club received generally favorable reviews from critics upon release. According to the review aggregator Metacritic, Therapy at the Club received "generally favorable reviews" based on a weighted average score of 71 out of 100 from 7 critic scores.

Vrinda Jagota of Pitchfork described Flo's album as a project "where plush harmonies power glossy 2000s pop-R&B throwbacks." Jagota particularly praised Flo's vocal production and thematic content, describing the group's songwriting as "emotionally ambiguous and nuanced romantic dynamics". Jagota wrote, "Pivotally, they sing about love and heartache with the experience and aplomb of a cool older sister doling out advice." Puah Ziwei of NME described the album as "disjointed" and a "loose story about the ups and downs of a night out at the club." Ziwei praised Flo's decision to experiment with pop music, writing "It's exciting to watch FLO pushing beyond the R&B sound they've already perfected, and the highs of 'Therapy...' prove there's much more ground for the trio to cover." Shante Collier-McDermott of Clash described the album as a "hooky, punchy experience brimming with anecdotes and intricate harmonies." Collier-McDermott argued that Flo "are leading with a vanguard of contemporary R&B that evokes its storied traditions while gestering to the future."

In a mixed review from Kate Solomon of The Guardian, who deemed track "Floating" as a song that showcases Flo's vocal chemistry, but criticised the album's pacing and thematic disconnect, and felt that "there's self-assurance to Therapy at the Club's unhurried pace, though more time sweating it out on the dancefloor would make it a more satisfying listen." Similarly, Paul Attard of Slant Magazine felt that while the album is "bolder, more direct, and often more fun" than the group's debut album, "Flo often cycles through styles so quickly that some barely register before the group picks up another one." Tara Hepburn of The Skinny praised the album's first half, and named "Cry Ugly", "Leak It", and "Miss U Missing Me" as album highlights, but criticised the album's lack of cohesion and pacing. Hepburn wrote that the album "could perhaps do with a firmer edit. Its best moments suggest there is a truly great ten-track pop album here trying to get out."

== Track listing ==
Therapy at the Club – Standard edition
No.	Title	Writer(s)	Producer(s)	Length
1.	"Side Effects"	Stella Quaresma; Forest "4rest" Moore; Jonah Christian	Christian; Oak^{[v]}	2:53
2.	"Small Doses"	Renée Downer; Boy Matthews	Cole YoursTruly; Jake Elliott; Skippz; Oak^{[v]}	2:29
3.	"Cry Ugly"	Jorja Douglas; Amy Allen; Warren Felder; Oscar Linnander; Matthews; Jayme Silverstein	Oak^{[p]}; Linnander; Silverstein	2:39
4.	"Leak It"	Douglas; Downer; Quaresma; Julian Bunetta; Steph Jones	Bunetta^{[p]}; Grant Boutin; Oak^{[v]}	3:03
5.	"Touché"	Quaresma; Moore; Alivia Blue; Sevyn Streeter	Tommy Brown; Leather Jacket; Oak^{[v]}	2:33
6.	"I Can't Be High Around You Anymore"	Downer; Bunetta; Lauren Keen; Kendrick Nicholls	Bunetta^{[p]}; KingJet; Oak^{[v]}	3:20
7.	"Sober"	Douglas; Downer; Quaresma; Matthews	Ashton Sellars; Skippz; Oak^{[v]}	2:31
8.	"Therapy at the Club"	Leroy Clampitt; Keen; Peter Rycroft	Clampitt; Lostboy; Keen; SpaceyKay^{[a]}; Oak^{[v]}	2:47
9.	"Remedied"	Douglas; Allen; Felder; Linnander; Silverstein	Oak^{[p]}; Linnander; Silverstein	2:08
10.	"Pose" (featuring Juicy J)	Quaresma; Moore; Blue; Thomas De Quincey; Jordan Houston; Manuela Kamosi; Streeter	Brown; Leather Jacket; Oak^{[v]}	2:34
11.	"Call Me"	Douglas; Downer; Quaresma; Uzoechi Emenike; Jelli Dorman; DuWayne Phinisey; Streeter; Pop Wansel	MNEK^{[p]}; Phinisey; Wansel	2:54
12.	"Sex in Peace" (featuring Kwn)	Douglas; Downer; Quaresma; Eric Bellinger; Felisha Harvey; Khyra Wilson	D. Phelps; KP Page; Oak^{[v]}	3:25
13.	"Floating"	Douglas; Downer; Quaresma; Jonas Asker; Ryan Buendia; Gino Haddon; Jean-Baptiste Kouame; Sebastian Lundberg; Karl Rubin; Jacquez Swanigan; Victor Thell	Astral Weeks; Buendia; Jean-Baptiste; Rubin; Thell; Oak^{[v]}	2:33
14.	"Miss U Missing Me"	Douglas; Matthews; Skippz	Elliott; Sellars; Skippz; Oak^{[v]}	3:30
15.	"Don't Break Her Heart"	Douglas; Downer; Quaresma; Bunetta; Jones	Bunetta^{[p]}; Oak^{[v]}	3:44
16.	"Haterbooth"	Douglas; Downer; Quaresma; Darius Dixson; Jared Solomon	Solomonophonic; Oak^{[v]}	3:07
Total length:				46:11

Therapy at the Club – Jorja CD bonus track
No.	Title	Length
17.	"808"

Therapy at the Club – Renée CD bonus track
No.	Title	Length
17.	"What's Meant for Me"

Therapy at the Club – Stella CD bonus track
No.	Title	Length
17.	"Body Language"

Therapy at the Club – Pre-Drinks digital edition
No.	Title	Length
17.	"Therapy at the Club" (live from NPR’s Tiny Desk)
18.	"Haterbooth" (live from NPR’s Tiny Desk)
19.	"Leak It" (Vevo live)
20.	"Therapy at the Club" (Vevo live)
21.	"Haterbooth" (demo version)
22.	"The Story Of: Haterbooth" (Voice Note)
23.	"Leak It" (demo version)
24.	"The Story Of: Leak It"
25.	"Cry Ugly" (demo version)
26.	"The Story Of: Cry Ugly"

Therapy at the Club: Club Therapy With Honey Dijon disc 1 — digital edition
No.	Title	Length
1.	"Small Doses" (Honey Dijon remix)	4:59
2.	"Pose" (Honey Dijon remix)	4:08
3.	"Call Me" (Honey Dijon remix)	4:24
4.	"Don't Break Her Heart" (Honey Dijon remix)	4:02
5.	"Haterbooth" (Honey Dijon remix)	3:45
6.	"Miss U Missing Me" (Honey Dijon remix)	3:50
7.	"Touché" (Honey Dijon remix)	2:37
8.	"Therapy at the Club" (Honey Dijon remix)	6:07

=== Notes ===
- ^{^[p]} signifies a producer and vocal producer
- ^{^[a]} signifies an additional producer
- ^{^[v]} signifies a vocal producer
- "I Can't Be High Around You Anymore" contains an uncredited sample of "1st of tha Month", written by Bryon McCane, DJ U-Neek, Michael Powell, Wish Bone, Layzie Bone, and Krayzie Bone, as performed by Bone Thugs-n-Harmony.
- "Pose" samples "Pump Up the Jam", written by Manuela Kamosi, Thomas de Quincey, and Farley "Jackmaster" Funk, as performed by Technotronic.
- "Call Me" contains an uncredited sample of "Shutdown", written by Joseph Adenuga, as performed by Skepta.

== Personnel ==
Credits are adapted from Tidal.

=== Flo ===
- Jorja Douglas – vocals
- Renée Downer – vocals
- Stella Quaresma – vocals

=== Additional contributors ===
- Oak – vocal engineering (tracks 1–10, 12–16); bass, drums, keyboards, programming (3, 9); engineering (3)
- Sean McNamara – vocal engineering (1–10, 12–16), engineering (9)
- Charlie Holmes – mixing (1–3, 7–9, 12, 13, 16)
- Matt J Barnes – mixing assistance (1–3, 7–9, 12, 13, 16)
- Simon Francis – mastering (1–3, 5, 7–14, 16)
- Jayme Silverstein – bass, guitar, keyboards (3, 9)
- Oscar Linnander – guitar, engineering (3, 9)
- Julian Bunetta – recording arrangement, vocal arrangement, engineering (4); bass, drums, guitar, programming, synthesizer (6, 15)
- Nathan Dantzler – mastering (4, 6, 15)
- Harrison Tate – mastering assistance (4, 6, 15)
- Serban Ghenea – mixing (4, 6, 15)
- Bryce Bordone – engineering (4, 6)
- Jeff Gunnell – engineering assistance (4), engineering (15)
- Steph Jones – vocal arrangement (4)
- Grant Boutin – engineering (4)
- Jaycen Joshua – mixing (5, 10, 11)
- Arran Powell – bass (5)
- Kendrick Nicholls – bass, drums, programming, synthesizer (6)
- Jake Elliott – programming (7)
- Leroy Clampitt – drum programming, electric bass guitar (8)
- Lostboy – drum programming, piano (8)
- Juicy J – vocals (10)
- MNEK – engineering (11)
- D. Phelps – bass, drums, keyboards, programming (12)
- Kwn – vocals (12)
- Neil MacLeod – mixing (14)
- Jared Solomon – bass, electric guitar, keyboards (16)

== Charts ==
Chart performance
Chart (2026)	Peak position
Australian Albums (ARIA)	49
Australian Hip Hop/R&B Albums (ARIA)	6
Belgian Albums (Ultratop Flanders)	82
Belgian Albums (Ultratop Wallonia)	135
French Albums (SNEP)	115
Japanese Dance & Soul Albums (Oricon)	18
New Zealand Albums (RMNZ)	38
Portuguese Albums (AFP)	174
Scottish Albums (Official Charts)	4
UK Albums (Official Charts)	5
UK R&B Albums (Official Charts)	1
US Billboard 200	168
US Top R&B Albums (Billboard)	22
