= John K (musician) =

American singer (born 1990)

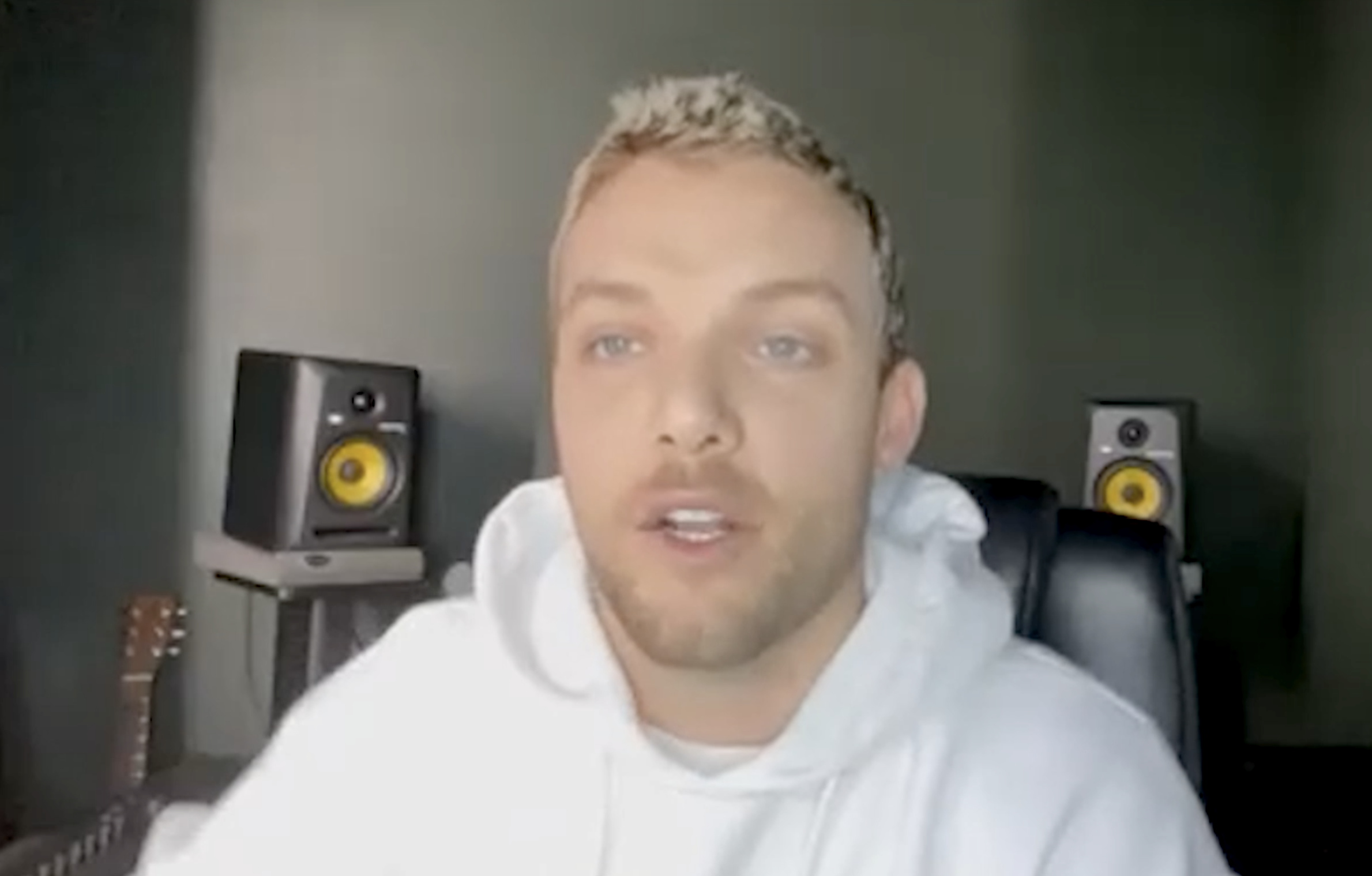
- John K in 2021

Background information
- Born: John Poulson Keyser; October 24, 1990 (age 35)
- Origin: Pompano Beach, Florida, U.S.
- Genres: Pop
- Occupation: Singer
- Years active: 2010-present
- Labels: Epic Records
- Website: musicbyjohnk.com

John Poulson Keyser (born October 24, 1990), known professionally as John K (formerly stylized as JOHN.k), is an American pop singer.

== Career ==
As Johnny Keyser, he was first featured on American Idol in the eleventh season, in which he made it to the Las Vegas Rounds. The following season, he reached the quarterfinals. In between seasons, he released his seven-tracked debut independent EP, From Where I Stand (2012). It reached #44 on the Billboard Heatseeker Albums charts.

K's first single was the song "OT", which he self-released in 2017. His single "If We Never Met" came to the attention of Elvis Duran, who got K booked to perform the song on Today.

He signed with Epic Records in April 2019. His follow-up single to "If We Never Met" was titled "Wasted Summer".

In April 2020, his single "If We Never Met" was certified gold by RIAA. In September of the same year, his single "If We Never Met" was certified platinum by RIAA.

== Discography ==
=== Studio albums ===
Title	Album details
Love + Everything Else	Released: November 13, 2020; Label: Epic; Format: Digital download
In Case You Miss Me	Released: June 25, 2021; Label: Epic; Format: Digital download
Salt + Light	Released: July 18, 2025; Label: Epic; Format: Digital download

=== Extended plays ===
Title	EP details	Peak chart positions
Title	EP details	US Heat
If We Never Met	Released: April 26, 2019; Label: Epic; Format: Digital download	7

=== Singles ===
==== As lead artist ====
Title	Year	Peak chart positions		Certifications	Album/EP
Title	Year	US Bub.	US Adult	Certifications	Album/EP
"Runnin'"	2017	—	—		Non-album singles
"Gold" (with Ricky Remedy)	2017	—	—		Non-album singles
"OT"	2017	—	—		Non-album singles
"Wrong"	2017	—	—		Non-album singles
"Best of Me"	2018	—	—		Non-album singles
"If We Never Met" (solo, featuring Kelsea Ballerini or with Sigala)	2019	13	11	RIAA: 2× Platinum	If We Never Met and Love + Everything Else
"Wasted Summer" (with Teamwork and Loote)	2020	—	—		Non-album single
"6 Months"	2020	—	18		Love + Everything Else
"Happiness"	2020	—	18		Love + Everything Else
"Cheap Sunglasses"	2020	—	—		Love + Everything Else
"ILYM" (featuring Rosie)	2021	—	—		Non-album single
"Everything"	2021	—	—		In Case You Miss Me
"A Lot"	2022	—	26		Salt + Light
"Guitars and Drugs"	2022	—	—		Non-album singles
"Something Worth Working On"	2022	—	—		Non-album singles
"Be Alright"	2022	—	—		Non-album singles
"U Sometimes"	2022	—	—		Non-album singles
"Lost"	2024	—	—		Salt + Light
"Honey"	2025	—	17		Salt + Light
"River"	2025	—	—		Salt + Light
"Never Been in Love"	2025	—	18		Salt + Light
"—" denotes a recording that did not chart or was not released.

==== As featured artist ====
Title	Year	Album/EP
"Problems" (Don Diablo and JLV featuring John K)	2021	Forever
"Wish You Were Here" (Two Friends featuring John K)	2022	Non-album single
