= Joe Becker (musician) =

American guitarist and composer (born 1976)

- Born: Joseph Christopher Becker Jr. June 23, 1976 (age 50)
- Origin: Chicago, Illinois, United States
- Genres: Instrumental rock, blues, shred metal
- Instruments: Guitar, piano, bass
- Years active: 1980–present
- Website: Official website

Joseph Christopher Becker Jr. (born June 23, 1976, in Chicago, Illinois) is an American guitarist, composer and multi-instrumentalist.

== Early life ==
Becker started playing guitar at the age of four and was dubbed a child prodigy after appearing on Jonathan Brandmeier's radio show at ages 7, 8 and 9.

== Worked with ==
Becker has recorded with guitarists Jason Becker, Todd Duane and Joe Kelley and on releases with Eddie Van Halen, Steve Vai, Jason Becker, Marty Friedman, Richie Sambora, Jeff Healey, Chris Poland, Bruce Kulick, Michael Angelo Batio, Steve Morse, Buckethead, Alex Skolnick, Bumblefoot, Blues Saraceno, Lars Eric Mattsson, Jeff Pilson, Mark Wood, Ron Keel, Randy Coven, Enuff Z'nuff and Trixter.

== Musical style ==
Mike Varney, writing in Guitar Player magazine in 2005, said that "Becker is a very versatile and lyrical player who runs the gauntlet from shred to ear-catching, melodic instrumentals, at times bringing to mind players such as Joe Satriani and Eric Johnson"

Becker's guitar playing introduces techniques characteristically more advanced than the styles in which he writes, such as tapping and sweep-picking in blues or folk. In addition to writing and recording all the music on his records, he also plays all the instruments (guitar, bass, piano, strings) except drums.

Becker stopped writing, playing and recording music in 2009 for personal reasons and resumed in 2015.

== Movies and soundtracks ==
Becker's tracks "Hot As Love" and "Hard Times" were featured in the 2019 film The Fixer, from RavensFilm Productions.

Becker scored the soundtrack of the horror film Leaf Blower Massacre 2, released by T-Nasty Productions.

Becker performed on the soundtrack of the horror film Curse Of The Slasher Nurse, released by Screamtime Films.

Becker performed on the soundtrack of the horror film Creekers, released by R.U. Plugged In Productions.

Becker performed on the soundtrack of the horror film Cellar Secret, released by Faux Pas Films.

Becker performed on the soundtrack of the horror film Cannibal Claus, released by The Sleaze Box.

Becker performed on the soundtrack of the horror film Ghoulish Tales, released by The Sleaze Box.

Becker performed on the soundtrack of the short horror film The Passage, released by Nightmare Film Crew.

Becker performed on the soundtrack of the horror film Memento Mortis, released by Troma Entertainment.

Becker performed on the soundtrack of the horror film Rise of The Scarecrows, released by Cinema Epoch.

Becker performed on the soundtrack of the horror film Evil Awakening, released by Tempe Video.

== Discography ==
- Monster (Spinning Records/Joe Becker Music, 2018)
- Cannibal Claus Motion Picture Soundtrack (Sleaze Box Records, 2016)
- Guitar Wizards Volumes 3 & 4 (Versailles Records, 2014, 2015)
- Hot As Love (Joe Becker Music, 2009)
- A Night at the White Room (Joe Becker and Joe Kelley, Joe Becker Music, 2008)
- Short Stories: Chops from Hell (2006)
- Labour of Love (34 West Records, 2006)
- Morley Sampler CD Vol. 4 (Morley Pedals, 2005)
- Warped Sense (Spinning Records/Joe Becker Music, 2004)
- Shred 101: Chops From Hell (2003)
- Warmth in the Wilderness Volume 2 (Avalon/Marquee, 2002)
