= Leak It =

2026 single by Flo

Single by Flo

from the album Therapy at the Club
- Released: 20 March 2026
- Genre: Pop; R&B
- Length: 3:03
- Label: EMI
- Songwriters: Jorja Douglas; Renée Downer; Stella Quaresma; Julian Bunetta; Steph Jones
- Producers: Julian Bunetta; Grant Boutin

Flo singles chronology
"Recently Deleted" (2025)	"Leak It" (2026)	"Don't Break Her Heart" (2026)

Music video
- "Leak It" on YouTube

"Leak It" is a song recorded by British girl group Flo. It was released on 20 March 2026 through EMI Records as the lead single from the group's second studio album, Therapy at the Club (2026). As well as Flo having writing credits on the track, it was also co-written by Julian Bunetta and Steph Jones, with Bunetta and Grant Boutin handling the production. "Leak It" sees Flo depart from their typical R&B sound, with the track compared to 2000s British girl groups including All Saints, Girls Aloud and Sugababes.

The lyrical content of the song dissects modern fame and the confidence they feel looking at photos of themselves, wanting to "leak" them and grab the attention of current and former partners. A music video for "Leak It", directed by Olivia De Camps, accompanied the song upon its release and features Flo enrolling in a wellness retreat where celebrities are trained in the rules of modern fame. Flo chose "Leak It" as their lead single hoping it would fare well in the charts following a lack of charting for the group; it charted within the top 50 in the UK, as well as charting in Lithuania, New Zealand and on the Rhythmic Airplay chart in the U.S. It also received major airplay in Germany, charting within the Top 10.

== Background and release ==
After forming in 2019, Flo released two extended plays (EPs): The Lead (2022) and 3 of Us (2023). They then released their debut studio album, Access All Areas (2024). It charted within the top three of the UK Albums Chart, as well as marking their chart debut on the Billboard Top 200 chart. It then saw Flo's first nomination for a Grammy award; it was nominated for Best Progressive R&B Album at the 68th Annual Grammy Awards. Their nomination marked the first British female R&B act to be nominated since Floetry over twenty years prior. They were also nominated for R&B Act at the 2025 Brit Awards. To celebrate the award nominations, an "unlocked" version of Access All Areas was released, featuring four unreleased songs and various remixes.

Flo's first musical release of 2026 was "Mamacitas", a contribution to the soundtrack of the 2026 film Goat. On 4 February, they appeared on PlaqueBoyMax's live stream and previewed "Leak It". It was later confirmed as the lead single from their second studio album, Therapy at the Club (2026). "Leak It" was released on 20 March 2026, with its music video premiering the same day. The group hoped it would experience decent charting unlike previous singles and felt the song helped them to "return with a bang".

== Composition and lyrics ==
"Leak It" was written by the three members of Flo alongside Julian Bunetta and Steph Jones. Bunetta and Grant Boutin handled the production. It saw Flo depart from their typical R&B sound; member Stella Quaresma told BBC News that they had been experimenting with different genres but noted that confidence and feeling good was a staple theme for the new music.

The lyrical content of the track dissects modern fame, specifically playfully doing things for attention. Flo sing about the confidence they feel looking at photos of themselves, wanting to leak them and grab the attention of current and former partners, as well as increasing the stats on their social medias. With the track, Flo were reminded of the girl groups they grew up listening to and gained confidence from, hoping "Leak It" would do the same for listeners.

== Music video ==
A music video for "Leak It", directed by Olivia De Camps, accompanied the song upon its release. The concept of the video sees Flo enrol in a wellness retreat where celebrities are trained in the rules of modern fame. It features the group staging photoshoots for paparazzi as well as a "high-energy dance routine". Speaking on the video, the group said: "The video is iconic! And we're proud that it's ours. This is the video we dreamt of having as teenagers. We're cunty, we're funny, we're bold, we're FLO. We hope everyone loves it as much as we do." The choreography later became a trend on social media, which Quaresma was delighted by, stating it was the first time Flo had experienced a viral dance trend. A choreography-driven version of the music video was later released.

== Live performances ==
Flo debuted "Leak It" alongside "AAA" at the 2026 MOBO Awards. They opened the ceremony, which they also had three nominations at. They went on to win the accolade for Best R&B/Soul Act following the performance.

== Critical reception ==
Tom Breihan, writing for Stereogum, noticed and complimented Flo's change in sound, noting that they sounded less like TLC and 702, but more like British girl groups from the 2000s: All Saints, Sugababes, and Girls Aloud. He felt "Leak It" did their legacy proud, calling it a "slinky, hooky track". Breihan acknowledged that neither himself nor most listeners would be able to relate to the celebrity message within the song, but felt that made the song fun. The lyrical content of the song, as well as the cover art and music video, were compared to Britney Spears' "Piece of Me". Earmilk billed the song "the hot anthem of the summer that will make you get ready and take a selfie".

== Credits and personnel ==
Credits adapted from Spotify.

- Jorja Douglas – vocals, songwriting
- Renée Downer – vocals, songwriting
- Stella Quaresma – vocals, songwriting
- Julian Bunetta – production, songwriting, recording and vocal arrangement
- Steph Jones – songwriting, vocal arrangement
- Grant Boutin – production, recording engineer
- Oak – vocal production and engineer
- Sean McNamara – vocal engineer
- Jeff Gunnell – recording second engineer
- Serban Ghenea – mixing engineer
- Bryce Bordone – engineer
- Nathan Dantzler – mastering engineer
- Harrison Tate – mastering second engineer

== Charts ==
=== Weekly charts ===
Weekly chart performance
Chart (2026)	Peak position
Australia Hip Hop/R&B (ARIA)	22
Croatia International Airplay (Top lista)	92
Estonia Airplay (TopHit)	119
Germany Airplay (MusicTrace)	8
Israel TV Airplay (Media Forest)	2
Israel International TV Airplay (Media Forest)	1
Lithuania Airplay (TopHit)	34
New Zealand Hot Singles (RMNZ)	12
Nicaragua Anglo Airplay (Monitor Latino)	3
Slovakia Airplay (ČNS IFPI)	12
UK Singles (Official Charts)	45
UK R&B Singles (Official Charts)	2
US Rhythmic Airplay (Billboard)	26

=== Monthly charts ===
Monthly chart performance
Chart (2026)	Peak position
Lithuania Airplay (TopHit)	35

== Release history ==
Region	Date	Format	Label	Ref.
Various	20 March 2026	Digital download; streaming	EMI	
United States	31 March 2026	Rhythmic contemporary radio	EMI	
