= Waylon Wyatt =

American country music singer

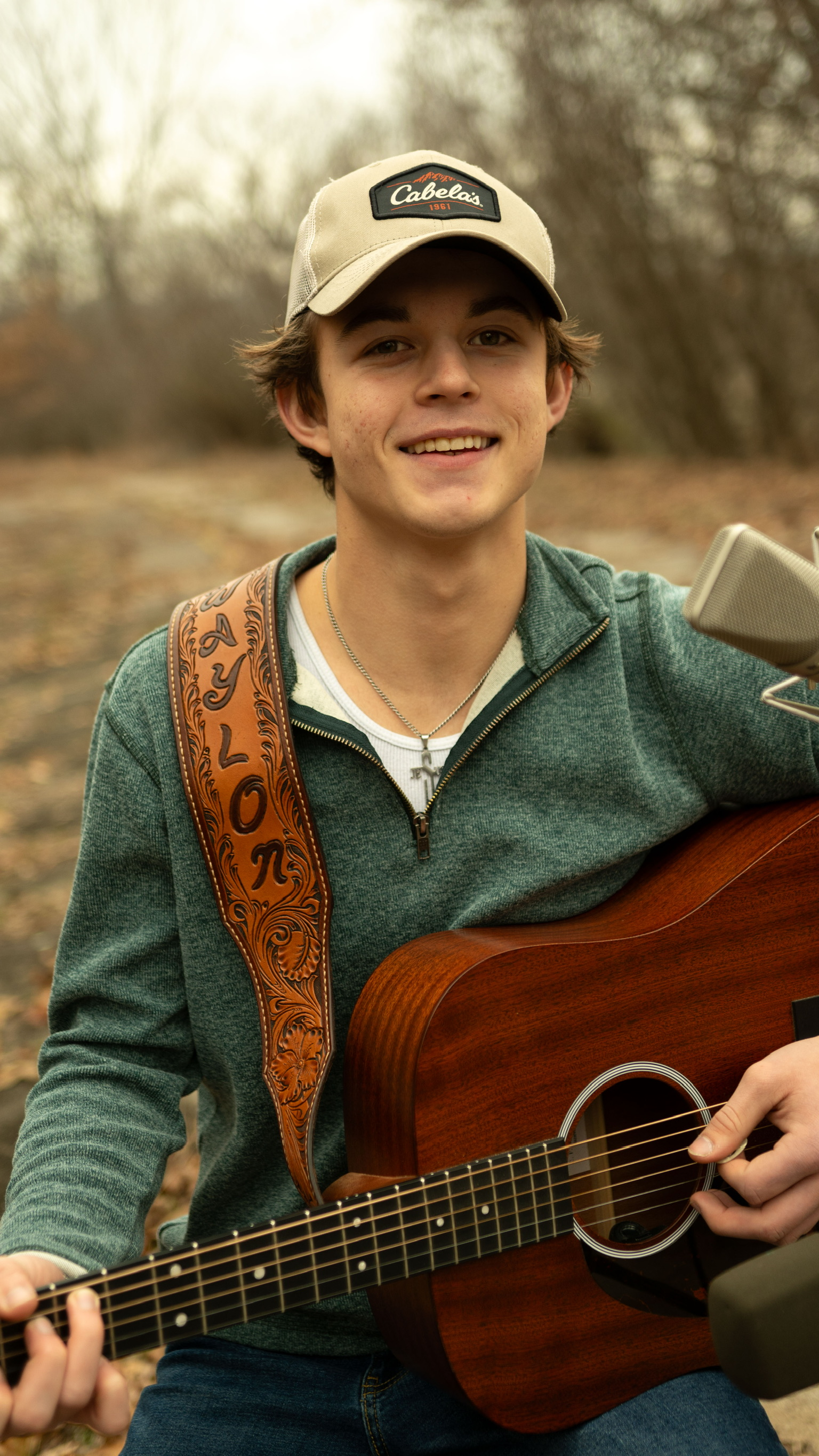
- Wyatt in 2023

Background information
- Born: Waylon Wyatt Potter; 16 October 2006 (age 19); Hackett, Arkansas, U.S.
- Genres: Country; red dirt; Americana; folk
- Occupations: Singer-songwriter; musician; producer
- Years active: 2024–present
- Labels: Music Soup; Darkroom
- Website: www.waylonwyatt.com

Waylon Wyatt Potter (born October 16, 2006) is an American country music singer-songwriter, musician, and producer from Hackett, Arkansas. He garnered popularity when his first song "Everything Under the Sun" became viral on TikTok. He is signed to Darkroom Records and has released two extended plays with the label. His debut album, Dustpiles, was released in July 2026.

== Early life ==
Wyatt was born and raised in Hackett, Arkansas, and wrote his first song, titled "How to Be a Man", at age six. Despite an initial interest in rap music, he discovered country music on YouTube when he was fifteen. Of his upbringing, Wyatt stated, “we didn't grow up rich, but I wouldn't say we grew up in a cardboard box or anything like that. We grew up in a pretty nice house; I have hard-workin’ parents, you know? We had some good money comin’ in, but we just really didn't have the time and we couldn't really plan to [see live music]”. His first concert was Wyatt Flores at Cain's Ballroom. His brother Dylan, also a musician, took his own life when Wyatt was eight years old, and Wyatt cites him as the primary reason he learned to play guitar, feeling that he honors his brother's memory each time he plays. Dylan's loss inspired the song "Phoning Heaven", which appears on Wyatt's debut EP Til the Sun Goes Down.

== Career ==
Wyatt was working for his father Charley's construction company when a video of him performing his original song "Everything Under the Sun" gained over 100,000 views on TikTok overnight. Despite being sceptical, having only posted covers on his social media accounts prior due to fear of negative comments, he had been convinced to post it by a friend, and then began receiving calls from record labels a week later, ultimately signing with Music Soup and Darkroom Records. He released his debut extended play, Til the Sun Goes Down, which includes "Everything Under the Sun", "Phoning Heaven", and "Arkansas Diamond", a track that has tallied over 50 million streams, in July 2024. He subsequently released an expanded version of the EP featuring eight tracks on November 14, 2024.

Wyatt befriended Bayker Blankenship after seeing him perform a cover of his song "Arkansas Diamond" on social media. The two began writing songs together and released "Jailbreak" and "Sunday Supper" on January 17, 2025. They performed the song live together on CBS Saturday Morning. "Smoke & Embers", a duet with Willow Avalon, was released on April 2, 2025. On May 12, 2025, Wyatt released "Sincerely, Your Son", a tribute to his parents. Out of the Blue, his second EP, was released on June 6, 2025. Wyatt described it as a reflection of his first two years on tour while balancing life as a full-time student during the week. It was the first project Wyatt had recorded in a studio with a band. Around this time, "Arkansas Diamond" became his first to be certified gold by the Recording Industry Association of America. "Jailbreak" became Wyatt's second single to be certified gold. Wyatt released his next single "Wishbone" on September 5, 2025, the same day that he began his 35 date Out of the Blue Tour, beginning in Fayetteville and extending until November with various shows across the US and Canada. His final single of 2025, "Frostbite", was released on November 14.

In January 2026, Wyatt announced his Everything Under the Sun headlining tour, in addition to dates throughout the year supporting Sam Barber, and international appearances at the C2C: Country to Country festival in Europe. Wyatt released "In Loving Melody", an ode to a failed relationship, on February 6, 2026. Country Central gave the song a 9.8 out of 10, writing, "the power and intimacy of this love story are deepened by [Wyatt's] subtle dips into his lower register and the tasteful whine that curbs his enunciation. On this single, Wyatt crafts a song as intricate as it is devastatingly beautiful". On February 20, 2025, Wyatt released "Didn't Forget", which features Wyatt Flores to positive critical reception, with Billboard declaring it one of the six best new country songs that week and calling it "a compelling collaboration from two emerging talents with rising momentum".

On May 14, 2026, Wyatt announced his debut album, Dustpiles, would be released on July 17. He made his Grand Ole Opry debut a few days later on July 22.

== Sound and influences ==
Wyatt describes his major influences as Tyler Childers, Hank Williams, Turnpike Troubadors, Wyatt Flores, Johnny Cash, and Eminem. Of his music, which blends elements of country, red dirt, folk, and americana, Wyatt stated, “I don't really want to put myself into one genre, because I figure if I do and then I start doing something different, I might surprise people a little too much, and they might not like it”. He notes that his music is primarily lyric-driven, taking inspiration from poetry and from what feels good in his heart. In terms of his sound, Wyatt states, “I'm very stern about, like, I don't want a lot of production in my music. That's not what I'm looking for. I love the raw sound – the raw vocals, raw guitar, raw acoustic. Nothing overlaid on it”. His music has drawn comparisons to Childers, Flores, Sam Barber, and Zach Bryan.

== Personal life ==
Wyatt is a Christian, and describes his faith as very important to him, stating “I'm a God-fearing man, you know? I'm a believer in Christ, and a verse that has always stuck with me is Colossians 3:23; it reads, “Whatever you do, do with all your heart, working for the Lord and not human masters.”

On July 16, 2026, the day before the release of his debut album, Wyatt was hospitalised with sepsis, which led to his postponing several live shows, including his Grand Ole Opry debut.

== Discography ==
=== Studio albums ===
List of albums, with selected details
Title	Album details
Dustpiles	Release date: July 17, 2026; Label: Music Soup/Darkroom; Format: CD, digital download, streaming

=== Extended plays ===
List of albums, with selected details
Title	Album details
Til the Sun Goes Down	Release date: November 15, 2024; Label: Music Soup/Darkroom; Format: Digital download, streaming
Out of the Blue	Release date: June 6, 2025; Label: Music Soup/Darkroom; Format: Digital download, streaming

=== Singles ===
List of singles
Year	Title	Album
2025	"Jailbreak"/"Sunday Supper" with Bayker Blankenship	Non-album single
2025	"I'd Be Delighted"	Out of the Blue
2025	"Smoke & Embers" with Willow Avalon	Out of the Blue
2025	"Sincerely, Your Son"	Out of the Blue
2025	"Wishbone"	Non-album singles
2025	"Pretty Little Liar"	Non-album singles
2025	"Frostbite"	Non-album singles
2026	"In Loving Melody"	Dustpiles
2026	"Didn't Forget" with Wyatt Flores	Non-album single
2026	"Dead Man Walkin'"	Dustpiles
2026	"But There Was a Time"	Dustpiles
2026	"Leave It Alone"	Dustpiles
2026	"Box of Bones"	Dustpiles

== Tours ==
- Dustpiles World Tour (2026-27)

== Awards and nominations ==
Year	Association	Category	Nominated work	Result	Ref.
2025	Arkansas Country Music Awards	Americana Artist of the Year	Himself	Nominated	
2025	Arkansas Country Music Awards	Acoustic Act of the Year	Himself	Won	
2025	Arkansas Country Music Awards	Young Artist of the Year	Himself	Won	
2025	Arkansas Country Music Awards	Musical Collaboration of the Year	"Jailbreak"	Nominated	
2026	Arkansas Country Music Awards	Entertainer of the Year	Himself	Nominated	
2026	Arkansas Country Music Awards	Male Vocalist of the Year	Himself	Nominated	
2026	Arkansas Country Music Awards	Americana Artist of the Year	Himself	Nominated	
2026	Arkansas Country Music Awards	Acoustic Artist of the Year	Himself	Nominated	
2026	Arkansas Country Music Awards	Young Artist of the Year	Himself	Nominated	
2026	Arkansas Country Music Awards	Album of the Year	Til' the Sun Goes Down	Won	
2026	Arkansas Country Music Awards	Musical Collaboration of the Year	"Sunday Supper"	Won	
2026	Billboard	21 Under 21	Himself	Won	
