= Worst Behaviour =

2024 song by Kwn

Single by Kwn
- Released: 1 November 2024
- Recorded: 2024
- Genre: R&B; trap
- Length: 2:58
- Label: Independent
- Songwriters: Kwn; Sasha Keable
- Producer: Kwn

Kwn singles chronology
"Eyes Wide Open" (2024)	"Worst Behaviour" (2024)	"Worst Behaviour (Remix)" (2025)

"Worst Behaviour" is a song by British singer, songwriter, rapper, and producer Kwn, released on 1 November 2024 as a standalone single. The song has been widely viewed as sultry trap-infused R&B production, After gaining popularity, she released a remix with American singer, and songwriter Kehlani on February 14, 2025, which was included on Kwn's second extended play (EP), With All Due Respect released by RCA Records in 2025.

== Background and release ==
Kwn released "Worst Behaviour" independently following earlier singles including "Eyes Wide Open" and "Lord I’ve Tried", as well as her appearance on Kehlani’s "Clothes Off". The song initially received a limited release through her website before becoming available on digital streaming platforms. The song was created during an Instagram Live session at her mother’s home. Kwn stated that she and her manager independently organised the song’s rollout, including an early sales campaign that sold approximately 5,500 units before its wider release.

The song was co-written by Kwn and London artist Sasha Keable, with whom she had previously collaborated on R&B projects. The song was released on November 1, 2024.

== Composition and style ==
The song features a minimalist, hard-hitting beat with trap elements and deep bass.

== Remix ==
"Worst Behaviour (Remix)"

Remix by Kwn featuring Kehlani

from the EP With All Due Respect
- Released: 14 February 2025
- Recorded: 2025
- Genre: R&B; Trap music
- Length: 3:22
- Label: RCA Records
- Songwriters: K. Wilson; Kehlani Ashley Parrish; Sasha Keable
- Producer: Kwn

Kwn chronology
"Worst Behaviour" (2024)	"Worst Behaviour (Remix)" (2025)

Music video
- "Worst Vehaviour ft. Kehlani" on YouTube

The remix which featured Kehlani, was dropped by Kwn in February 14, 2025 aligning with Valentine's Day. In the statement provided by Kwn, he mentioned that the remix was an idea from Kehlani, proposing the creation of another variation of the song. This was supported by a video shot in London and directed by Chris Chance. It features Kwn and Kehlani in a dimly lit warehouse with a luxury car, neon lights. The most talked-about moment was their on-camera kiss, which Kwn later acknowledged she expected would "shake the internet."

The remix outperformed the original version, amassing over 16 million official on-demand U.S. streams within its first month. Critics praised the synergy between Kwn's atmospheric vocals and Kehlani's smooth delivery, describing the collaboration as "sultry, confident, and a career-defining moment" for Kwn.

== Reception ==
The original version of "Worst Behaviour" received positive reviews from music critics. New Wave Magazine described the track as "soaked in confidence and swagger, with a mix of sensuality and roughness that commands the listener to take note," and praised its atmospheric production and commanding vocal delivery.

The remix featuring Kehlani was also met with favorable reception. IndustryMe wrote that the collaboration "takes the fiery hit to a whole new level," noting it as a highlight in Kwn's career following her placement on the outlet's 2025 Purple List. New Wave Magazine called the remix "a must-add to this week's playlists," citing its "steamy vocals, evocative lyricism, and striking visual counterpart".

== Charts ==
chart positions and certifications, showing year released and album name
Title	Year	Peak chart positions			Album
Title	Year	US R&B /HH	US R&B	UK	Album
"Worst Behaviour"	2024	—	15	58	Non-album single
"Worst Behaviour (Remix)" (featuring Kehlani)	2025	50	9	—	With All Due Respect
"—" denotes releases that did not chart or were not released in that territory.

== Certifications ==
Region	Certification	Certified units/sales
New Zealand (RMNZ)	Gold	15,000^{‡}
^{‡} Sales+streaming figures based on certification alone.

== Release history ==
Release dates and formats for "Worst Behaviour"
Region	Date	Format	Label	Ref.
Various	1 November 2024	Digital download; Streaming	Independent	

Release dates and formats for "Worst Behaviour (Remix)"
Region	Date	Format	Label	Ref.
Various	14 February 2025	Digital download; Streaming	RCA Records	
